= Selena videography =

Videos and media by American singer

Selena video discography
- Video albums: 12
- Music videos: 22

American singer Selena had released 22 music videos and 12 video/live albums during her career. Her first music video was "Buenos Amigos", which is a duet with Salvadoran singer Álvaro Torres. It was released in summer 1991 and featured an orchestra performing behind Selena and Torres. Selena's first music video as a solo artist, "La Carcacha", was released four months after "Buenos Amigos". In the video, Selena dances in front of a chroma key (which shows a busy highway) and videos of people walking down the streets. "La Llamada" was released in spring 1993; it features Selena and a couple of people dancing the cumbia dance in a beach house in Malibu, California. "Donde Quiera Que Estés" was filmed in New York City and was released in December 1993. The video features Selena and the Barrio Boyzz' dancing in the styles of hip hop.

"Amor Prohibido" was released on Valentine's Day in 1994 and was filmed in Joshua Tree national park in Joshua Tree, California. "Bidi Bidi Bom Bom" was filmed at the Santa Monica pier, while "No Me Queda Más" was filmed at the San Antonio, Texas' Amtrak station, becoming Selena's final music video to be released while she was alive. "No Debes Jugar" was released in July 1995 by Telemundo and featured live performances of Selena singing the song in their television show Padrisimo. "Fotos y Recuerdos", which was also released by Telemundo in July, featured home videos of Selena. In August 1995, "I Could Fall in Love" was released, it featured videos and pictures of Selena. The music video for "Dreaming of You" featured an actress playing the role as a lonely and depressed girl packing her clothes to run away with her boyfriend. Before the girl leaves, the video shows her mother (who is tired of cleaning) heading to the back of the house and looking at the sky at night, while her husband is sleeping. The video's message is telling viewers that they should be with their loved ones because life is too short.

"Techno Cumbia" features unreleased scenes of the "Bidi Bidi Bom Bom" music video and a group of dancers who danced along with the music. "Tú Sólo Tú", being released in September 1995, featured videos and pictures of Selena. Mariachi Sol de México were featured in the video, they also were the backup singers in the song. "I'm Getting Used to You", which became the final music video to be released from Dreaming of You, featured "Selena wannabe's" auditioning for the role of "Selena", while the other scene featured two young adults who are in love. "Siempre Hace Frio" was released to promote the remix album Siempre Selena. Jennifer Lopez is featured in the video as "Selena", though her entire body was covered with charoma key. "No Quiero Saber (Remix)" was released in December 1996 and featured Selena performing the song in various concerts.

"Viviras Selena", which is a tribute song, was released in March 1997. The video was filmed in Q-Productions recording studio, where Tejano singers such as Pete Astudillo, Bobby Pulido, Emilio Navaria, Jennifer Peña, Graciela Beltran and the Barrio Boyzz' recording the song live. "A Boy Like That" was released in summer 1997 and was directed by Kenny Ortega. The video features backup dancers wearing shirts that are covered in radioluminescence paint. "Missing My Baby" was a promotional video that was filmed and created by VH1 producers. The video was promoting the box-set Anthology (1998) and was released in fall 1998. "Disco Medley" music video features Selena's performance of the song at the Houston Astrodome on February 26, 1995. In 2001, Los Tres Reyes released their duet-version of "No Me Queda Más"; Selena was only featured in two scenes of the music video. During Selena's tenth death anniversary her brother's band Kumbia Kings released a remix video of "Baila Esta Cumbia" in March 2005.

== Music videos ==
| Year | Song | Album | Director |
|---|---|---|---|
| 1991 | "Buenos Amigos" (duet with Álvaro Torres) | Nada Se Compara Contigo | |
| 1992 | "La Carcacha" | Entre a Mi Mundo | Cecilia Miniucchi |
| 1993 | "La Llamada" | Live! | Cecilia Miniucchi |
| 1994 | "Donde Quiera Que Estés" (duet with Barrio Boyzz) | Donde Quiera Que Estés | Laurice Bell |
| 1994 | "Amor Prohibido" | Amor Prohibido | Cecilia Miniucchi |
| 1994 | "Bidi Bidi Bom Bom" | Amor Prohibido | Cecilia Miniucchi |
| 1994 | "No Me Queda Más" | Amor Prohibido | Sean Davered |

=== Posthumous music videos ===
| Year | Song | Album | Director |
|---|---|---|---|
| 1995 | "No Debes Jugar" | Live! | |
| 1995 | "Fotos y Recuerdos" | Amor Prohibido | |
| 1995 | "I Could Fall in Love" | Dreaming of You | Hector Galan |
| 1995 | "Dreaming of You" | Dreaming of You | Doug Kluthe |
| 1995 | "Tú Sólo Tú" | Dreaming of You | |
| 1995 | "Techno Cumbia" | Dreaming of You | |
| 1995 | "I'm Getting Used to You" | Dreaming of You | |
| 1996 | "Siempre Hace Frio" (also features footage of Jennifer Lopez as Selena) | Siempre Selena | |
| 1996 | "No Quiero Saber" | Siempre Selena | |
| 1997 | "A Boy Like That" | Songs of the West Side Story | Kenny Ortega |
| 1997 | "Viviras Selena" | Selena: The Original Motion Picture Soundtrack | Abraham Quintanilla, Jr. |
| 1997 | "Disco Medley" | Selena: The Original Motion Picture Soundtrack | |
| 1998 | "Missing My Baby (Anthology Remix)" | Anthology | |
| 2005 | "Baila Esta Cumbia (Remix)" (with A.B. Quintanilla and Kumbia Kings) | Duetos | |
| 2015 | "Como la Flor" | Entre a Mi Mundo | |
| 2016 | "Tú No Sabes" (recorded in 1987) | And the Winner Is | |

== Video/Live albums ==
| Year | Title | Sales and certifications |
|---|---|---|
| 1993 | Live! | United States: Gold (standard) (500,000 copies) |
| 1999 | All My Hits: On Video | |
| 2001 | Live! The Last Concert | United States: Platinum (Latin type) (100,000 copies) |
| 2002 | Ones | United States: Gold (standard) (500,000 copies) |
| 2003 | Greatest Hits | |
| 2005 | Selena Remembered | |
| 2005 | Unforgettable: The Live Album | |
| 2005 | Selena ¡VIVE! | |
| 2006 | Dos Historias | |
| 2007 | Through the Years / A Traves de los Años | United States: Gold (standard) (500,000 copies) |
| 2009 | A Night to Remember | |
| 2010 | Performances | |
| 2011 | Performances Live | |
| 2015 | Johnny Canales Presenta Selena | |
| 2020 | Live 1987 | |

== See also ==
- Selena albums discography
- Selena singles discography
