= Selena singles discography =

- Singles: 24
- Promotional singles: 8

American singer Selena released twenty-four official singles, seven promotional singles. Her career began as the lead vocalist of Los Dinos in 1980. Her albums with Los Dinos on indie labels failed to achieve any chart success. In 1987, her remake of Ritchie Valens' "La Bamba" peaked at number 19 on the United States Billboard Hot Latin Songs chart, her first entry. She signed with EMI Latin nine years later as a solo artist though her band continued to tour with her. Selena appeared on "Buenos Amigos" with Salvadoran singer Álvaro Torres. The track peaked at number one on the U.S. Hot Latin Songs chart in 1991, the singer's first number one song. Subsequent singles, "Baila Esta Cumbia" and "Como la Flor", became popular songs on Mexican radio, with "Como la Flor" launching the singer's career in that country. "Como la Flor" peaked at number six on the Hot Latin Songs chart, despite popular culture claims that it was the singer's first number one single. The track has charted on the U.S. Regional Mexican Digital Songs list since its inception in 2010 and remains the singer's signature number and most popular recording.

Selena's first live album, Live (1993), contained three studio tracks and produced two top-five U.S. singles, "No Debes Jugar" and "La Llamada". After her collaboration with the Barrio Boyzz on the single "Donde Quiera Que Estés" peaked at number one on the Hot Latin Songs chart, Selena released her fourth studio album, Amor Prohibido (1994). The album continued the singer's streak of US number one singles with "Amor Prohibido", "Bidi Bidi Bom Bom", "No Me Queda Más", and The Pretenders' cover "Fotos y Recuerdos". The latter peaked at number one posthumously following the shooting death of Selena on March 31, 1995. "Amor Prohibido" and "No Me Queda Más" became the most successful U.S. Latin singles of 1994 and 1995, respectively. At the time of her death, Selena was in the process of crossing over into the American pop market. Recording labels EMI Latin and EMI Records jointly released Dreaming of You several months after her death. Fearful that the song might cannibalize sales of the album in the U.S., EMI Records released "I Could Fall in Love" as a promotional single. It became the highest charting English-language song on the Hot Latin Songs chart for two years and became her first number one single in Canada. The title track, "Dreaming of You" became the highest charting Billboard Hot 100 song of the singer's career, peaking at number 22. Her cover of Pedro Infante's "Tú Sólo Tú" peaked at number one on the Hot Latin Songs for ten consecutive weeks; the longest number-one single of her career. "I'm Getting Used to You" peaked at number one on the U.S. Dance/Electronic Singles Sales; her first number one on that chart.

Selena's last recorded song, "A Boy Like That" (a song from the 1967 musical West Side Story) was part of the National Academy of Recording Arts and Sciences honoring the musical. The song was also a benefit recording for AIDS Project Los Angeles. It peaked at number four on the U.S. Dance Club Songs chart after its release in 1996. In 2002, Selena's brother and music producer A.B. Quintanilla mashed "Como la Flor", "Amor Prohibido", and "Si Una Vez" into a medley entitled "Con Tanto Amor Medley" to promote the album Ones. Since Billboard magazine began monitoring music downloads in 2010, Selena's songs re-entered the U.S. charts including first time entries "La Carcacha" (1990), "Ya Ves" (1990), "Enamorada de Ti" (1990), "Baila Esta Cumbia" (1992), and "El Chico del Apartamento 512" (1994).

== Singles ==
=== Solo career ===
Title	Year	Peak chart positions							Sales	Certifications	Album
Title	Year	US	US AC	US Latin	US Latin Pop	US Reg. Mex	AUS	CAN	Sales	Certifications	Album
"Contigo Quiero Estar"	1989	—	—	—	—	—	—	—			Selena
"Sukiyaki"	1989	—	—	—	—	—	—	—			Selena
"Mentiras"	1989	—	—	—	—	—	—	—			Selena
"Baila Esta Cumbia"	1990	—	—	—	—	—	—	—		RIAA: 6× Platinum (Latin)	Ven Conmigo
"Ya Ves"	1990	—	—	—	—	—	—	—			Ven Conmigo
"La Tracalera"	1990	—	—	—	—	—	—	—			Ven Conmigo
"La Carcacha"	1992	—	—	—	—	—	—	—		RIAA: 3× Platinum (Latin)	Entre a Mi Mundo
"Como la Flor"	1992	—	—	6	—	9	—	—		RIAA: 9× Platinum (Latin)	Entre a Mi Mundo
"¿Qué Creias?"	1992	—	—	14	—	—	—	—		RIAA: Gold (Latin)	Entre a Mi Mundo
"Ámame"	1993	—	—	27	—	—	—	—			Entre a Mi Mundo
"No Debes Jugar"	1993	—	—	3	—	—	—	—		RIAA: Platinum (Latin)	Selena Live!
"La Llamada"	1993	—	—	5	—	—	—	—		RIAA: Platinum (Latin)	Selena Live!
"Amor Prohibido"	1994	—	—	1	—	5	—	—		RIAA: 7× Platinum (Latin)	Amor Prohibido
"Bidi Bidi Bom Bom"	1994	—	—	1	11	4	—	—		RIAA: 9× Platinum (Latin)	Amor Prohibido
"No Me Queda Más"	1994	—	—	1	13	1	—	—		RIAA: 4× Platinum (Latin)	Amor Prohibido
"Fotos y Recuerdos"	1995	—	—	1	12	1	—	—		RIAA: Platinum (Latin)	Amor Prohibido
"I Could Fall in Love"	1995	—	12	2	1	5	60	10		RIAA: Gold	Dreaming of You
"Dreaming of You"	1995	22	9	11	9	—	—	30	US: 254,000	RIAA: Gold	Dreaming of You
"Techno Cumbia"	1995	—	—	4	—	4	—	—		RIAA: Platinum (Latin)	Dreaming of You
"El Toro Relajo"	1995	—	—	24	—	14	—	—			Dreaming of You
"I'm Getting Used to You"	1996	— (Note: "I'm Getting Used to You" did not enter the Billboard Hot 100, but peaked at number seven on the Bubbling Under Hot 100 Singles chart.)	23	—	—	—	—	65			Dreaming of You
"Siempre Hace Frio"	1996	—	—	2	—	2	—	—			Siempre Selena
"No Quiero Saber"	1996	—	—	6	10	15	—	—			Siempre Selena
"Costumbres"	1996	—	—	15	—	13	—	—			Siempre Selena
"Disco Medley"	1997	—	—	25	8	—	—	—			Selena: The Original Motion Picture Soundtrack
"—" denotes a recording that did not chart or was not released in that territory.

=== Selena y Los Dinos singles ===
Title	Year	Peak chart positions	Album
Title	Year	US Latin	Album
"La Bamba"	1987	19	And the Winner Is...
"Soy Amiga (A.B. Quintanilla III Remix)"	2015	—	Non-album single
"—" denotes a recording that did not chart or was not released in that territory.

== Promotional singles and other charted songs ==
Title	Year	Peak chart positions				Certifications	Album
Title	Year	US Dance	US Rhythmic	US Latin	US Regional	Certifications	Album
"Missing My Baby"	1992	—	22	—	—		Entre a Mi Mundo
"Tú Sólo Tú"	1995	—	—	1	1	RIAA: Platinum (Latin)	Dreaming of You
"A Boy Like That"	1997	4	—	—	—		Selena: The Original Motion Picture Soundtrack
"Where Did the Feeling Go?"	1997	—	—	—	—		Selena: The Original Motion Picture Soundtrack
"Is It the Beat?"	1997	—	—	—	—		Selena: The Original Motion Picture Soundtrack
"Con Tanto Amor Medley"	2002	—	—	—	—		Ones
"Puede Ser" (with Nando "Guero" Dominguez)	2004	—	—	—	—		Momentos Intimos
"—" denotes a recording that did not chart or was not released in that territory.

== Other appearances ==
List of singles, with selected chart positions
Title	Year	Peak chart positions			Certification	Album
Title	Year	US Latin	US Latin Pop	US Regional Mexican	Certification	Album
"Buenos Amigos" (with Álvaro Torres)	1991	1	—	—	RIAA: Gold (Latin)	Nada Se Compara Contigo
"Donde Quiera Que Estés" (with the Barrio Boyzz)	1994	1	1	—	RIAA: Gold (Latin)	Donde Quiera Que Estes
"Baila Esta Kumbia" (with the Kumbia Kings)	2005	44	—	16		Duetos
"—" denotes a recording that did not chart or was not released in that territory.

== See also ==
- Billboard Top Latin Songs Year-End Chart
- List of songs recorded by Selena
- Selena albums discography
- Selena videography

== Sources ==
- Burr, Ramiro (1999). The Billboard Guide to Tejano and Regional Mexican Music. New York, NY: Billboard books. ISBN 978-0-8230-7691-8.
- Castrellón, Cristina (2007). Selena: Su Vida Después De Su Muerte. Penguin Random House Grupo Editorial México. ISBN 978-607-11-1036-7.
- Clark, Walter Aaron (2013). From Tejano to Tango: Essays on Latin American Popular Music. New York, NY: Routledge. ISBN 978-1-136-53687-8.
- Malone, Bill C. (2003). Southern Music/American Music. Lexington, KY: University Press of Kentucky. ISBN 978-0-8131-2635-7.
- Patoski, Joe Nick (1996). Selena: Como La Flor. Boston, MA: Little Brown and Company. ISBN 978-0-316-69378-3.
- Pérez, Deborah (2009). Rethinking Chicana/o and Latina/o Popular Culture. New York, NY: Springer. ISBN 978-0-230-10168-5.
- Stavans, Ilan (1998). The Riddle of Cantinflas Essays on Hispanic Popular Culture (1st ed.). Albuquerque, NM: University of New Mexico Press. ISBN 978-0-8263-5257-6.
- García, Alma M. (2002). The Mexican Americans (1st ed.). Westport, CT: Greenwood Publishing Group. ISBN 978-0-313-31499-5.
