= List of songs recorded by Selena =

American singer Selena has recorded material for her five studio albums and has collaborated with other artists for duets and featured songs on their respective albums and charity singles. Her six indie label albums—Selena y Los Dinos (1984), Alpha (1986), Muñequito de Trapo (1986), And the Winner Is... (1987), Preciosa (1988), and Dulce Amor (1988)—were released prior to signing a recording contract with EMI Latin, who billed Selena as a solo artist despite her Los Dinos band's involvement in her releases. Most of these songs were written by the singer's father and manager Abraham Quintanilla, Jr. and from local Tejano music songwriters. Selena's brother, A.B. Quintanilla became her principal record producer and songwriter by 1989, though he fought to remain in this position with the release of Selena's self-titled debut album with EMI Latin. The company insisted on a Grammy Award-winning songwriter for Selena, Abraham went into an agreement that if A.B. failed to produce a successful album they would then collectively be in favor of a Grammy Award-winning producer for her next recording. Selena spawned three singles; "Contigo Quiero Estar", "Mentiras", and a Spanish-language cover of Kyu Sakamoto's 1960s Japanese song "Sukiyaki". Her Los Dinos band—newcomers Pete Astudillo, Joe Ojeda, and veteran Ricky Vela—were involved in the writing process for Selena's debut album.

EMI Latin allowed A.B. to remain the singer's producer and songwriter for Ven Conmigo (1990) after her first recording enjoyed moderate success. Six out of the ten songs on the album were written by her band. Local songwriter Johnny Herrera contributed to three tracks, including "Aunque No Salga el Sol" which was originally intended for Lisa Lopez. Vela wanted Selena to record Juan Gabriel's "Yo Me Voy" after listening to Rocío Dúrcal's version of the song. "Baila Esta Cumbia", the second single released from Ven Conmigo, was written by A.B. and Astudillo following a concert in West Texas. In 1991, Selena recorded a duet with Salvadoran singer Alvaro Torres on "Buenos Amigos", a song he wrote after attending one of her concerts. Entre a Mi Mundo (1992), Selena's third studio album, were written entirely by her band. It included the band's most innovative sound, at the time. "¿Qué Creias?", an unapologetic mariachi "kiss-off anthem", was written by A.B. and Astudillo, who co-wrote as a pair on most of the recordings on the album. Selena was credited as co-writer for "Ámame" and "Como la Flor", the latter became the singer's signature song. In Live! (1993), three out of the eleven songs were new studio recordings; "No Debes Jugar", "La Llamada", and "Tú Robaste Mi Corazón" (a duet with American singer Emilio Navaira), all of which were written by the band.

Selena was featured on the Barrio Boyzz 1994 single "Donde Quiera Que Estés", which was written by K. C. Porter, Miguel Flores, and Desmond Child. Finding it challenging to write another successful song following "Como la Flor", A.B. enlisted Vela and Astudillo with writing Amor Prohibido (1994); the singer's fourth studio album. Amor Prohibido is considered to be Selena's best work and her band's "crowning achievement". The album was supported with the title track "Amor Prohibido", "Bidi Bidi Bom Bom", "No Me Queda Más", and "Fotos y Recuerdos" as singles. The latter samples the Pretenders 1982 song "Back on the Chain Gang", while "Cobarde" was written by José Luis Borrego. On March 31, 1995, Selena was shot and killed by her friend and former manager of her boutiques. At the time of her death, Selena was working on a crossover into American pop music. Keith Thomas wrote "I Could Fall in Love", the lead single from her Dreaming of You (1995) album which were released posthumously. The titular track "Dreaming of You" was written by Franne Golde and Tom Snow, while Diane Warren wrote "I'm Getting Used to You" and Kit Hain wrote "Captive Heart". Selena's posthumous output includes the releases of the intended songs for the Don Juan DeMarco soundtrack: "Tú Sólo Tú" (a Pedro Infante cover), "El Toro Relajo", and "Siempre Hace Frio". The soundtrack album to the biopic film Selena, included songs written by her band, Norman Saleet, Pamela Phillips Oland, Frederick Perren, Dino Fekaris, Steve Greenberg, Paul Jabara, Van McCoy, Donna Summer, and Giorgio Moroder. Selena's charity effort, "A Boy Like That" was posthumously released to help raise funds for HIV/AIDS patients. "Con Tanto Amor Medley", a mash-up of "Como la Flor", "Amor Prohibido", and "Si Una Vez", was released as a single in 2002. Selena's last recording, "Puede Ser", was released in 2004 and is a duet with Nando "Guero" Dominguez, which was written by Selena's widower Chris Perez. As of 2018, some songs recorded by Selena remain unreleased or were unofficially digitally released by her family.

== Songs ==
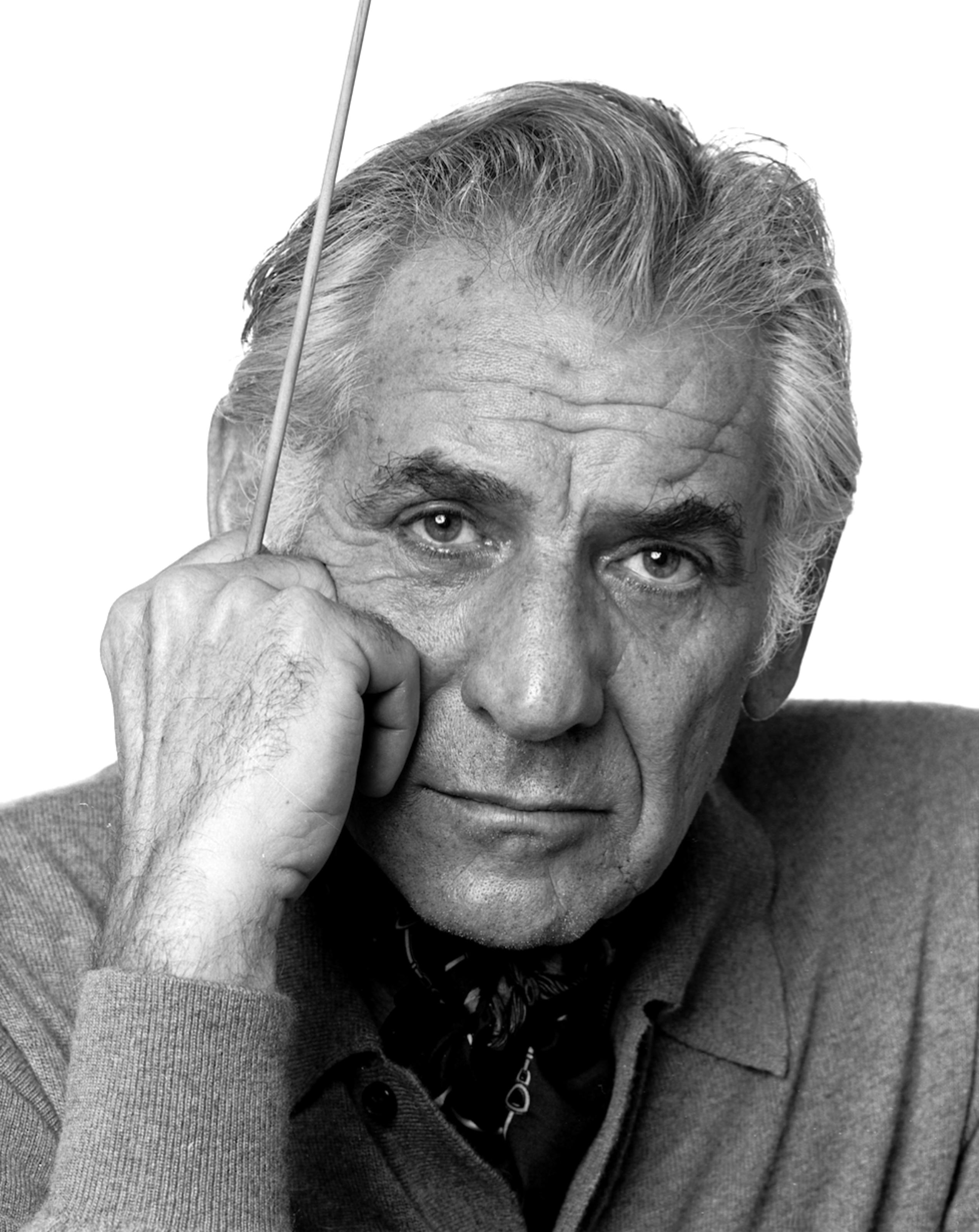
Selena recorded "A Boy Like That", a cover from the 1961 film adaption of the West Side Story. The track was written by Leonard Bernstein (pictured) and Stephen Sondheim.

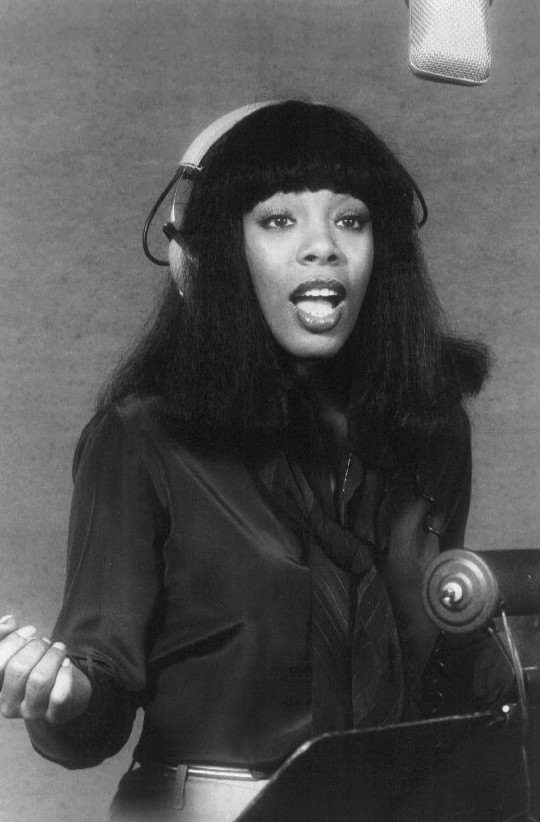
Two songs by American singer-songwriter Donna Summer were used to create the "Disco Medley" in 1997.

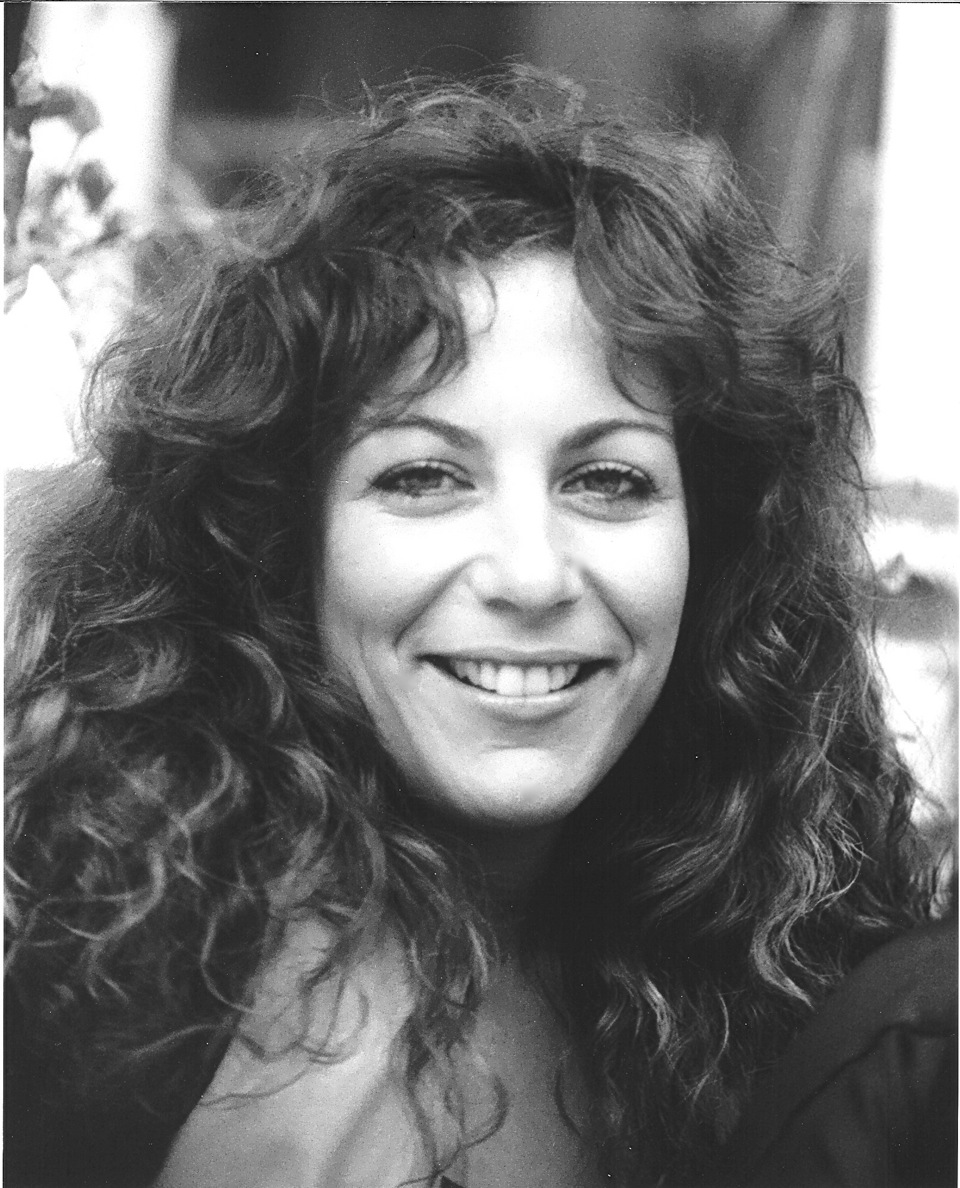
Franne Golde (pictured) co-wrote one of Selena's most recognized recording, "Dreaming of You", along with Tom Snow.

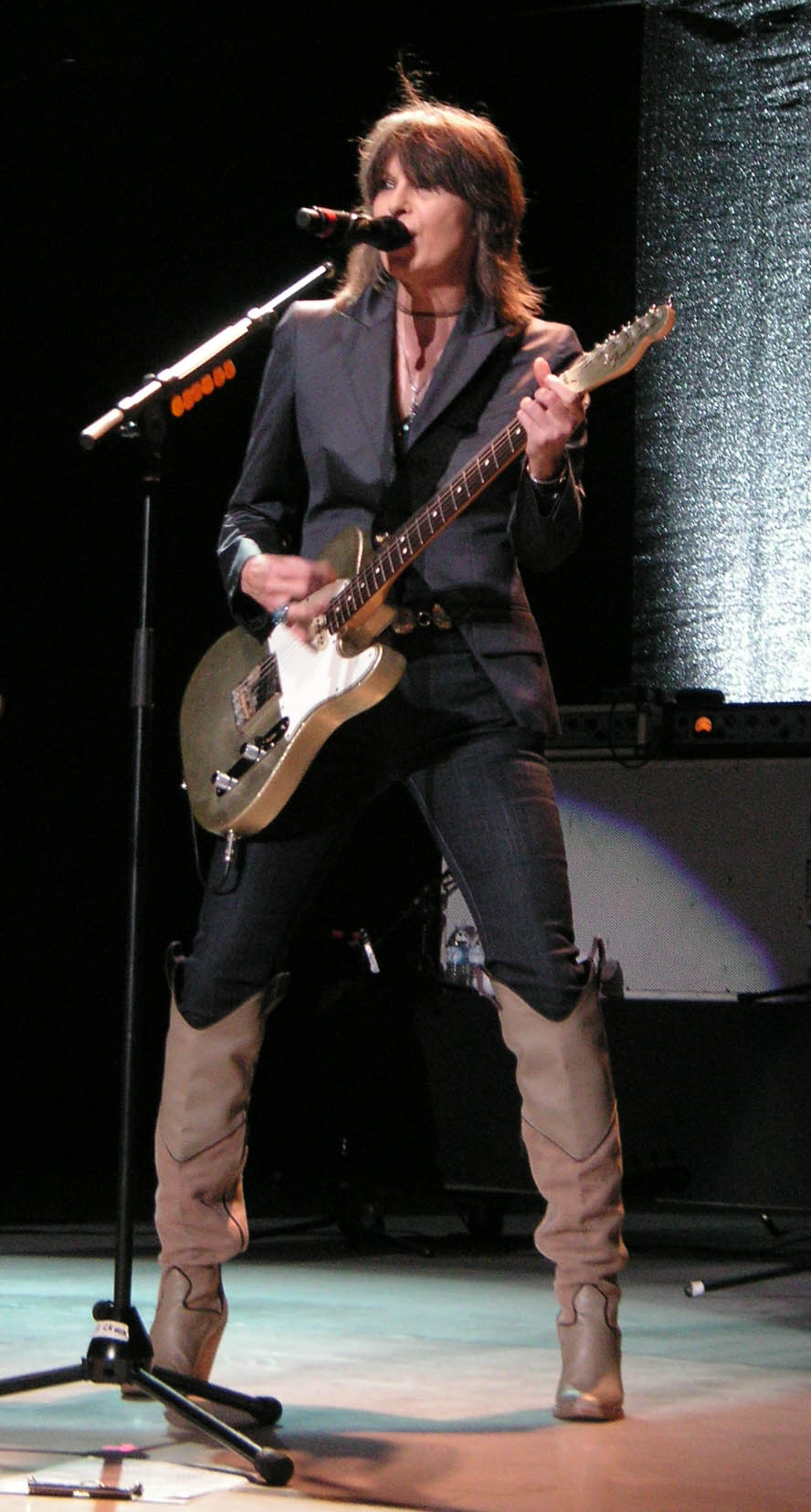
Selena's song "Fotos y Recuerdos" contained a sampled version of the American rock band The Pretenders' 1984 song "Back on the Chain Gang". Lead vocalist of the group, Chrissie Hynde (pictured), was given writing credits for the track.

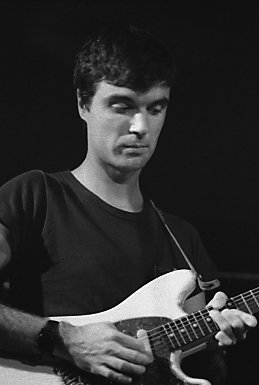
Selena precipitated with Scottish singer-songwriter David Byrne (pictured) on his recording "God's Child (Baila Conmigo)".

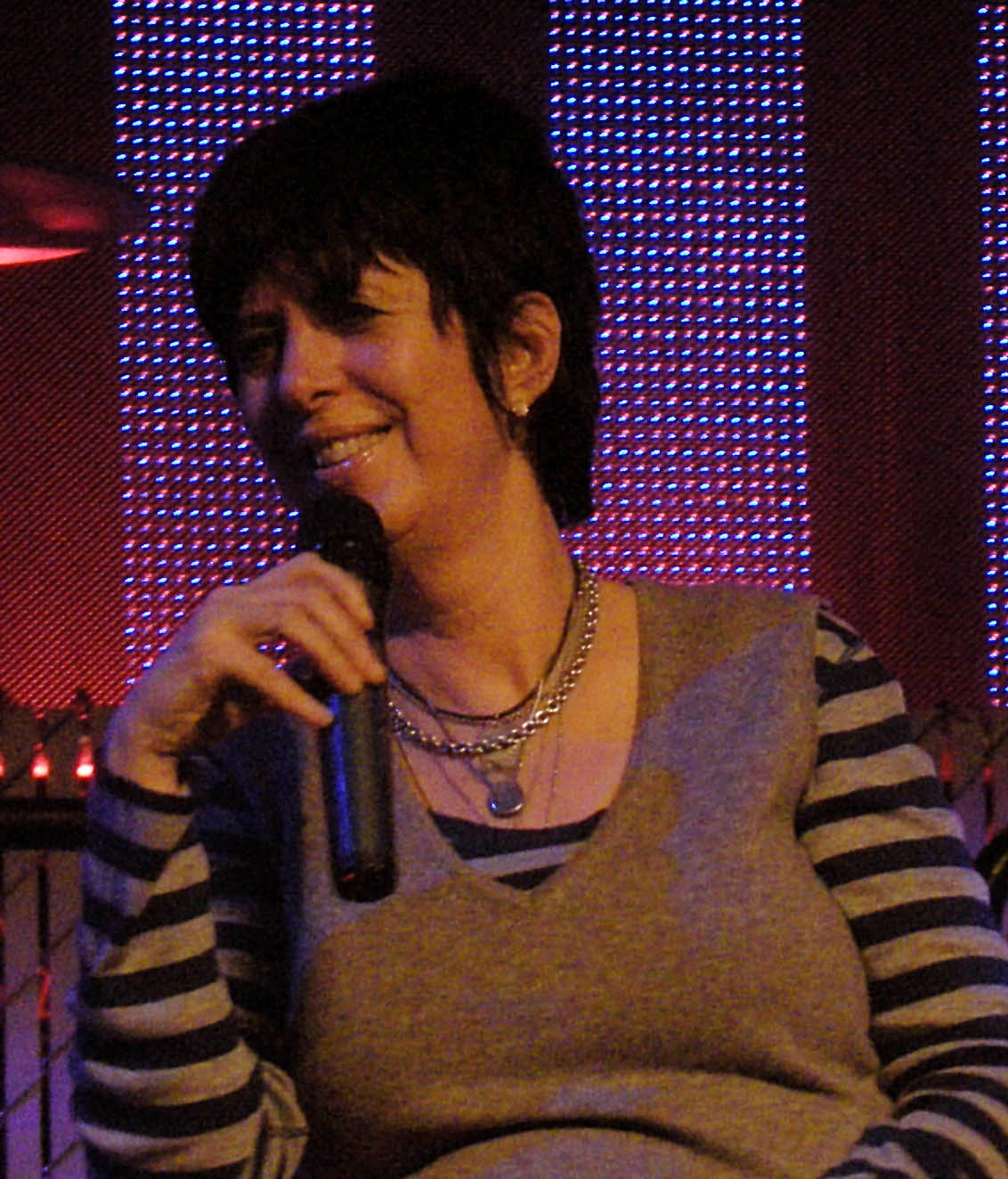
Diane Warren wrote "I'm Getting Used to You", which was released on the Dreaming of You album in 1995.

Key
‡	Indicates songs written or co-written by Selena
†	Indicates songs covered by Selena
#	Indicates songs released as singles

Name of song, writer(s), originating album and year of release.
Song	Writer(s)	Album	Year	Notes	Ref.
"Acuerdate de Mi"	A.B. Quintanilla	And the Winner Is...	1987		
"Always Mine"	A.B. Quintanilla	Dulce Amor	1988		
"Ámame" #‡	Selena Quintanilla; Pete Astudillo	Entre a Mi Mundo	1992		
"Ámame, Quiéreme" featuring Pete Astudillo	A.B. Quintanilla	Selena	1989		
"Amor Prohibido" #‡	Selena Quintanilla; A.B. Quintanilla; Pete Astudillo	Amor Prohibido	1994		
"Are You Ready to Be Loved?"	A.B. Quintanilla; Pamela Phillips Oland	—N/a	2015	Intended for Dreaming of You (1995); "Are You Ready to Be Loved?" was written by A.B. Quintanilla III and Pamela Phillips Oland and produced by A.B. Quintanilla III; The song was recorded during a rehearsal recording and was not recorded professionally in a studio; "Are You Ready to Be Loved?" was released on December 9, 2015 on SelenaQRadio.com	
"Aunque No Salga el Sol"	Johnny Herrera	Ven Conmigo	1990	Also Cara Records CA-247 a-side	
"Besitos"	A.B. Quintanilla	Selena	1989		
"A Boy Like That" #†	Leonard Bernstein; Stephen Sondheim	Songs of West Side Story	1996		
"Baila Esta Cumbia" #	A.B. Quintanilla; Pete Astudillo	Ven Conmigo	1990		
"Bidi Bidi Bom Bom" #‡	Selena Quintanilla; Pete Astudillo	Amor Prohibido	1994		
"Brindis de Amor"	Juan H. Barrón	Muñequito de Trapo	1986		
"Buenos Amigos" duet with Alvaro Torres #	Alvaro Torres	Nada Se Compara Contigo	1991		
"Call Me"	A.B. Quintanilla	Selena y Los Dinos	1984		
"Captive Heart"	Kit Hain; Mark Goldenberg	Dreaming of You	1995		
"Cariño, Cariño Mio"	A.B. Quintanilla	Dulce Amor	1988		
"Cariño Mio"	Ricky Vela	Preciosa	1988		
"Cien Años" #†	Fuentes Cervantes	Preciosa	1988		
"Cobarde"	José Luis Borrego	Amor Prohibido	1994		
"Como la Flor" #‡	A.B. Quintanilla; Pete Astudillo; Selena Quintanilla	Entre a Mi Mundo	1992		
"Con Tanto Amor Medley" #	A.B. Quintanilla; Pete Astudillo	Ones	2002	"Con Tanto Amor Medley" is medley of "Amor Prohibido", "Si Una Vez", "Como la Flor"	
"Cómo Quisiera"	A.B. Quintanilla; Ricky Vela	Preciosa	1988		
"Como Te Quiero"	Ricky Vela	Preciosa	1988		
"Con Esta Copa" †	Johnny Herrera	Alpha	1986		
"Contigo Quiero Estar" #	Alejandro Montealegre	Selena	1989		
"Corazón Abandonado"	Abraham Quintanilla, Jr.	And the Winner Is...	1987		
"Corazóncito"	A.B. Quintanilla; Manny Guerra	Alpha	1986		
"Costumbres" #†	Juan Gabriel	Dulce Amor	1988		
"Cruzare La Montaña"	Juan H. Barrón	Selena y Los Dinos	1984		
"Cuando Despierto"	Ricky Vela	Muñequito de Trapo	1986		
"Cuando Nadie Te Quiera"	José Alfredo Jiménez	And the Winner Is...	1987		
"Dame Tu Amor"	Abraham Quintanilla, Jr.	Alpha	1986		
"Dame Un Beso"	A.B. Quintanilla; Ricky Vela	Alpha	1986		
"Dejame Volar"	Carlos Vargas	—N/a	1983	Cara Records CA-238 a-side	
"Después de Enero"	Johnny Herrera	Ven Conmigo	1990		
"Diferentes"	Juan Gabriel	Muñequito de Trapo	1986		
"Dime"	A.B. Quintanilla	Dulce Amor	1988		
"Disco Medley: I Will Survive/Funkytown/Last Dance/The Hustle/On the Radio" #†	Frederick Perren; Dino Fekaris; Steve Greenberg; Paul Jabara; Van McCoy; Donna Summer; Giorgio Moroder	Selena: The Original Motion Picture Soundtrack	1997		
"Donde Quiera Que Estés" duet with the Barrio Boyzz #	K. C. Porter; Miguel Flores; Desmond Child	Donde Quiera Que Estés	1994		
"Dreaming of You" #	Franne Golde; Tom Snow	Dreaming of You	1995		
"Dulce Amor"	A.B. Quintanilla	Dulce Amor	1988		
"El Chico del Apartamento 512"	A.B. Quintanilla; Ricky Vela	Amor Prohibido	1994		
"El Circo"	Ricky Vela	Muñequito de Trapo	1986	Instrumental	
"El Ramalazo"	Tomás Méndez	Muñequito de Trapo	1986		
"El Tejano"	Ricky Vela; Manny Guerra	Alpha	1986	Instrumental	
"El Toro Relajo" #†	Felipe Bermejo	Dreaming of You	1995		
"Enamorada de Ti" (Daniela Romo Cover)	Daniela Romo; Danilo Vaona	Muñequito de Trapo	1986	Daniela Romo cover; Different from the 1990 song of the same name.	
"Enamorada de Ti"	A.B. Quintanilla; Pete Astudillo	Ven Conmigo	1990	Different from the 1986 song of the same name.	
"Encontré el Amor"	Abraham Quintanilla Jr. Rick James	—N/a	1983	Cara Records CA-216 a-side	
"Escribeme"	Abraham Quintanilla, Jr.	—N/a	1984	Cara Records CA-247 b-side	
"Estoy Contigo"	A.B. Quintanilla	Mis Primeros Exitos	1990	Also Cara Records CA-226 a-side	
"Feelings"	Morris Albert; Louis Gasté	Through the Years / A Traves de los Años	2007	Morris Albert cover; Selena recorded "Feeling" in 1978 when she was 7 years old; "Feelings" was released on April 3, 2007 on Through the Years / A Traves de los Años (2007)	
"Fotos y Recuerdos" #	Chrissie Hynde; Ricky Vela	Amor Prohibido	1994		
"Give Me One More Chance" †	Abraham Quintanilla, Jr.	Selena y Los Dinos	1984		
"God's Child (Baila Conmigo)" ‡ featuring David Byrne	David Byrne; Selena Quintanilla	Dreaming of You	1995		
"I Could Fall in Love" #	Keith Thomas	Dreaming of You	1995		
"I'm Getting Used to You" #	Diane Warren	Dreaming of You	1995		
"Is It the Beat?" #	A.B. Quintanilla; Pamela Phillips Oland	Selena: The Original Motion Picture Soundtrack	1997	English-language version of "Enamorada de Ti", recorded by Selena in 1989.	
"La Bamba" †	Beau Ryan	And the Winner Is...	1987		
"La Carcacha" #	A.B. Quintanilla	Entre a Mi Mundo	1992		
"La Llamada" #	A.B. Quintanilla	Selena Live!	1993		
"La Mirada"	Juan H. Barrón	Muñequito de Trapo	1986		
"La Tracalera" #	Johnny Herrera	Ven Conmigo	1990	Also Cara Records CA-238 b-side	
"La Puerta Se Cerró"	A.B. Quintanilla	Dulce Amor	1988		
"Las Cadenas"	A.B. Quintanilla; Ricky Vela	Entre a Mi Mundo	1992		
"Lo Tanto Que Te Quiero"	Abraham Quintanilla, Jr.	Selena y Los Dinos	1984		
"Lo Dejo Solo"	Ricky Vela	Classic Series, Vol. 1	2006		
"Mentiras" #	A.B. Quintanilla; Pete Astudillo	Selena	1989		
"A Million to One"	Phil Medley	Muñequito de Trapo	1986		
"Missing My Baby"	A.B. Quintanilla	Entre a Mi Mundo	1992		
"Muñequito de Trapo"	A.B. Quintanilla	Muñequito de Trapo	1986		
"My Love" ‡	Selena Quintanilla	Selena	1989		
"No Debes Jugar" #	A.B. Quintanilla	Selena Live!	1993		
"No Lloras Más Corazón"	A.B. Quintanilla	Dulce Amor	1988		
"No Puedo Estar Sin Ti"	Rick Longoria	—N/a	1981	Freddie Records FR-451 a-side	
"No Me Queda Más" #	Ricky Vela	Amor Prohibido	1994		
"No Quiero Saber" #	A.B. Quintanilla	Ven Conmigo	1990		
"No Te Vayas"	A.B. Quintanilla	Selena	1989		
"Only Love" †	Robbie Buchanan; Mark Spiro	Siempre Selena	1996		
"Oh Mamá"	Rubén Amado	—N/a	1985	Cara Records CA-282 a-side	
"Oh No (I'll Never Fall in Love Again)" ‡	Selena Quintanilla; A.B. Quintanilla	—N/a	2015	Intended for Dreaming of You (1995); "Oh No (I'll Never Fall in Love Again)" was written by Selena Quintanilla and her brother A.B. Quintanilla III and produced by A.B. Quintanilla III; The song was recorded during a rehearsal recording and was not recorded professionally in a studio; Had been scheduled to be recorded in studio on March 31, 1995, the day Selena died; Recorded in Spanish as "Oh No" by her brother A.B. Quintanilla III and his band Kumbia Kings on their debut album Amor, Familia y Respeto (1999), with A.B. Quintanilla III providing the spoken intro and background vocals and Jason "DJ Kane" Cano on lead vocals, and Spanish translation of the lyrics by Luigi Giraldo; "Oh No (I'll Never Fall in Love Again)" was released on September 10, 2015 on SelenaQRadio.com	
"Pa' Qué Me Sirve la Vida"	Jesús Monge	Alpha	1986		
"Parece Que Va a Llover"	Antonio Matas	Selena y Los Dinos	1984		
"Pensando En Ti"	Ricky Vela	Alpha	1986		
"Pero Como Te Ha Ido"	Johnny Herrera	Alpha	1986		
"Puede Ser" featuring Nando "Guero" Domínguez #	Chris Pérez; Ricky Vela	Momentos Intimos	2004	Duet with Nando Domínguez, who would later join Selena's brother A.B. Quintanilla III's band Kumbia Kings in 2003; Written by Los Dinos members Chris Pérez, Selena's husband, and Ricky Vela; Selena and Nando Domínguez recorded "Puede Ser" on March 17, 1995 and was Selena's last song she recorded; "Puede Ser" was released on March 23, 2004 on Momentos Intimos (2004)	
"Qué"	A.B. Quintanilla	Dulce Amor	1988		
"¿Qué Creias?" #	A.B. Quintanilla	Entre a Mi Mundo	1992		
"Quiero"	Quintanilla III	Preciosa	1988		
"Quiero Ser"	A.B. Quintanilla	Selena	1989		
"Quiero Estar Contigo"	Quintanilla III	Preciosa	1988		
"Quisiera Darte"	Ricky Vela	Dulce Amor	1988		
"Rama Caida"	Juan H. Barrón	Muñequito de Trapo	1986		
"Sabes"	Ricky Vela	Preciosa	1988		
"Salta La Ranita"	Victor H. Garza	And the Winner Is...	1987		
"Se Acabo El Amor"	Abraham Quintanilla Jr	—N/a	1981	Freddie Records FR-451 b-side	
"Se Me Hace"	Gerardo Olvera	—N/a	1983	Cara Records CA-226 b-side	
"Sentimientos"	Al Hurricane	Alpha	1986		
"Se Acabo Aquel Amor"	Abraham Quintanilla, Jr.	Selena y Los Dinos	1984		
"Si La Quieres"	Ricky Vela	Entre a Mi Mundo	1992		
"Si Una Vez"	A.B. Quintanilla; Pete Astudillo	Amor Prohibido	1994		
"Siempre"	Juan Gabriel	Preciosa	1988		
"Siempre Estoy Pensando en Ti" featuring Pete Astudillo	A.B. Quintanilla; Pete Astudillo	Entre a Mi Mundo	1992		
"Siempre Hace Frio" #†	Cuco Sanchez	Siempre Selena	1996		
"Soy Amiga"	Ricky Vela	Alpha	1986		
"Soy Feliz"	D.A.R; A. Quintanilla	—N/a	1983	Cara Records CA-216 b-side	
"Sukiyaki" #†	Rokusuke Ei; Hachidai Nakamura; Abraham Quintanilla, Jr. Pete Astudillo	Selena	1989		
"Te Amo Solo A Ti"	E.J. Ledesma	And the Winner Is...	1987		
"Techno Cumbia" #	A.B. Quintanilla; Pete Astudillo	Amor Prohibido	1994		
"Tengo Ganas de Llorar"	A.B. Quintanilla; Ricky Vela	Selena	1989		
"Terco Corazon"	A.B. Quintanilla	Preciosa	1988		
"Tres Dias"	Andres Huesca	And the Winner Is...	1987		
"Tres Veces No"	C. Blanes	Selena y Los Dinos	1984		
"Tu Eres"	A.B. Quintanilla; Pete Astudillo	Selena	1989		
"Tus Desprecios"	A.B. Quintanilla; Ricky Vela	Amor Prohibido	1994		
"Tu No Sabes"	Ricky Vela	And the Winner Is...	1987		
"Tú Robaste Mi Corazón" featuring Emilio Navaira	A.B. Quintanilla; Pete Astudillo	Selena Live!	1993		
"Tú Solamente Tú"	Camilo Sesto	Selena y Los Dinos	1984		
"Tú Sólo Tú" #†	Felipe Valdés Leal	Dreaming of You	1995		
"Un Primer Amor"	D.A.R	—N/a	1985	Cara Records CA-282 b-side	
"Ven Conmigo"	A.B. Quintanilla; Pete Astudillo	Ven Conmigo	1990		
"Ven A Verme"	Ricky Vela	And the Winner Is...	1987		
"Vuelve a Mi"	A.B. Quintanilla; Pete Astudillo	Entre a Mi Mundo	1992		
"Where Did the Feeling Go?" #†	Norman Saleet	Selena: The Original Motion Picture Soundtrack	1997		
"Wherever You Are (Donde Quiera Que Estés)" featuring the Barrio Boyzz	K. C. Porter; Miguel Flores; Desmond Child	Dreaming of You	1995	Posthumously re-recorded by the Barrio Boyzz in Spanglish.	
"Ya Lo Se Que Tu Te Vas" †	Juan Gabriel	Selena y Los Dinos	1984		
"Ya No"	A.B. Quintanilla; Ricky Vela	Amor Prohibido	1994		
"Ya Se Va"	Jorge Antonio Ramírez	Selena y Los Dinos	1984		
"Ya Ves" #	A.B. Quintanilla; Pete Astudillo	Ven Conmigo	1990		
"Yo Fui Aquella"	A.B. Quintanilla	Preciosa	1988		
"Yo Me Voy" †	Juan Gabriel	Ven Conmigo	1990		
"Yo Te Amo" featuring Pete Astudillo	A.B. Quintanilla; Pete Astudillo	Ven Conmigo	1990		
"Yo Te Dare"	A.B. Quintanilla	And the Winner Is...	1987		
"Yo Te Sigo Queriendo"	A.B. Quintanilla; Ricky Vela	Entre a Mi Mundo	1992		

== Unreleased songs ==
Name of song, writer(s), intended album, and year recorded.
Song	Writer(s)	Intended Album	Year	Notes	Ref.
"Cien Libras de Arcilla"	Abraham Quintanilla, Jr.	—N/a	1983		
"No Me Quieres Tanto" featuring Mariachi Sol de Mexico	Rafael Hernández	Don Juan DeMarco: The Original Motion Picture	1994		
"Si Quieres Verme Llorar" †	Johnny Herrera	—N/a	1983		
"Sweet Dreams" †	Don Gibson	—N/a	1983		
"Tomorrow's Rains Fall Today (In the Twilight of My Sorrow)"	Abraham Quintanilla, Jr. Johnny Herrera	—N/a	1983		
"You Needed Me" †	Randy Goodrum	—N/a	1983		

== See also ==
- Selena singles discography
- Selena albums discography

== Bibliography ==
- Márquez, Herón (2001). Latin Sensations. Minneapolis: Lerner Publications Co. ISBN 978-0-8225-4993-2.
- Mottola, Tommy (2016). A New America: How and Music Reshaped the Culture and Future of a Nation and Redefined My Life. Penguin Books. p. 105. ISBN 978-0451467782.
- Paredez, Deborah (2009). Selenidad: Selena, Latinos, and the Performance of Memory. Duke University Press. ISBN 978-0-8223-9089-3.
- Hewitt, Bill (April 17, 1995). "Before Her Time". People. 43 (15).
- Patoski, Joe Nick (1996). Selena: Como La Flor. Boston: Little Brown and Company. ISBN 0-316-69378-2.
- Ramirez, Rauly (March 31, 2015). "Celebrating Selena on her 20th anniversary". Billboard. Archived from the original on April 8, 2018.
- Peña, Manuel (2002). Música Tejana. Texas A&M University. ISBN 978-0-89096-888-8.
- Miniucchi, Cecilia (director) (1997). Selena Remembered (VHS/DVD documentary). Corpus Christi, Texas; Lake Jackson, Texas: EMI Latin. Event occurs at 60. ISBN 9786138555032. 724354452895.
- Quintanilla, Selena (1984). Selena y Los Dinos (Media notes). Abraham Quintanilla, Jr. (producer), Freddie Martinez (executive producer). Freddie Records.
- Quintanilla, Selena (1986a). Alpha (Media notes). A.B. Quintanilla (producer), Abraham Quintanilla, Jr. (executive producer), Manny Guerra (co-executive producer). GP Productions.
- Quintanilla, Selena (1986b). Muñequito de Trapo (Media notes). A.B. Quintanilla (producer), Abraham Quintanilla, Jr. (executive producer), Manny Guerra (co-executive producer). GP Productions.
- Quintanilla, Selena (1987). And the Winner Is... (Media notes). A.B. Quintanilla (producer), Abraham Quintanilla, Jr. (executive producer), Manny Guerra (co-executive producer). GP Productions.
- Quintanilla, Selena (1988a). Preciosa (Media notes). A.B. Quintanilla (producer), Abraham Quintanilla, Jr. (executive producer), Manny Guerra (co-executive producer). GP Productions.
- Quintanilla, Selena (1988b). Dulce Amor (Media notes). A.B. Quintanilla (producer), Abraham Quintanilla, Jr. (executive producer), Manny Guerra (co-executive producer). GP Productions.
- Quintanilla, Selena (1989). Selena (Media notes). A.B. Quintanilla (producer), Suzette Quintanilla (spoken liner notes producer). EMI Latin. 724354099403.
- Quintanilla, Selena (1990). Ven Conmigo (Media notes). A.B. Quintanilla (producer), Suzette Quintanilla (spoken liner notes producer). EMI Latin.
- Quintanilla, Selena (1990b). Mis Primero Exitos (Media notes). A.B. Quintanilla (producer), Suzette Quintanilla (spoken liner notes producer). EMI Latin.
- Torres, Alvaro (1991). Nadie Compara Contigo (Media notes).
- Quintanilla, Selena (1992). Entre a Mi Mundo (Media notes). A.B. Quintanilla (producer), Suzette Quintanilla (spoken liner notes producer). EMI Latin.
- Quintanilla, Selena (1993). Selena Live! (Media notes). A.B. Quintanilla (producer), Suzette Quintanilla (spoken liner notes producer). EMI Latin.
- Porter, K. C. (1994). Donde Quiera Que Estés (Media notes). the Barrio Boyzz (performers). EMI Latin.
- Quintanilla, Selena (1994). Amor Prohibido (Media notes). A.B. Quintanilla (producer), Suzette Quintanilla (spoken liner notes producer). EMI Latin. 724354099403.
- Songs from the West Side Story (Media notes). EMI Latin. 1996.
- Quintanilla, Selena (1995). Dreaming of You (Media notes). A.B. Quintanilla (producer), Suzette Quintanilla (spoken liner notes producer). EMI Latin.
- Quintanilla, Selena (1996). Siempre Selena (Media notes). A.B. Quintanilla (producer). EMI Latin.
- Quintanilla, Selena (1997). Selena: The Original Motion Picture Soundtrack (Media notes). A.B. Quintanilla (producer), Suzette Quintanilla (spoken liner notes producer). EMI Latin.
- Quintanilla, Selena (2002). Ones (Media notes). A.B. Quintanilla (producer), Suzette Quintanilla (spoken liner notes producer). EMI Latin.
- Quintanilla, Selena (2004). Momentos Intimos (Media notes). A.B. Quintanilla (producer), Suzette Quintanilla (spoken liner notes producer). EMI Latin.
- Quintanilla, Selena (2006). Classic Series, Vol. 1 (Media notes).
- Burr, Ramiro; Smith, Liz (November 5, 1996). "Selena CDs forever". San Antonio Express-News.
- Burr, Ramiro (1999). The Billboard Guide to Tejano and Regional Mexican Music. Billboard Books. ISBN 0-8230-7691-1.
- Ragland, Kathy (March 24, 1996). "With Respect". Austin American Statesmen.
- Verhovek, Sam Howe (April 1, 1995). "Grammy-Winning Singer Selena Killed in Shooting at Texas Motel". The New York Times. p. 1. Archived from the original on July 20, 2016.
- Cole, Patrick E.; Farley, Christopher John (July 10, 1995). "Old Rock, New Life — Page 2". Time. Time Inc. Archived from the original on November 7, 2012.
- Jennifer (September 11, 2006). "The Songs Of West Side Story - Various Artists - CD - Reviews & Prices @ Yahoo! Shopping". Shopping.yahoo.com.
- Pérez, Chris (2012). To Selena, with Love. Penguin Books. ISBN 978-1-101-58026-4.
- "Don Juan DeMarco". Internet Movie Database.
- Jusino, Teresa (24 September 2010). ""La Leyenda" Lives On: An Interview with Selena's Sister". 8 July 2010. PopMatters.
