= Selena albums discography =

Selena albums discography discography
- Studio albums: 11
- Soundtrack albums: 2
- Live albums: 3
- Compilation albums: 20
- Box sets: 3
- Remix albums: 3

American singer Selena released eleven studio albums, three live albums, three boxsets, three remix albums, two soundtrack albums, and twenty compilation albums. Credited for elevating a music genre into the mainstream market, Selena remains the best-selling Tejano recording artist in history, selling over 18 million records worldwide. She was named the top-selling Latin artist of the 1990s decade in the US by Billboard magazine.

Selena's career began as lead vocalist of Los Dinos in 1980. Her albums with Los Dinos on the indie labels failed to gain any chart success. She signed with EMI Latin nine years later as a solo artist though her band continued to tour with her. She released her self-titled debut album that same year, which peaked at number seven on the U.S. Billboard Regional Mexican Albums chart. With Selena, the singer outsold other competing female Tejano artists. Her second album, Ven Conmigo, was released a year later and was billed as the first Tejano recording by a female musician to achieve gold status in the United States. (Note: According to newspaper sources, Ven Conmigo was the first recording by a female Tejano singer to be certified gold, sales in excess of 50,000 units. However, the Recording Industry Association of America (RIAA) did not begin issuing Latin music certifications until 2001. The Latin music industry began relying as early as 1963 on an unknown source who provided sales figures based on the certification alone.) In 1992, Selena released her "breakthrough album", Entre a Mi Mundo, which helped launch the singer's career in Mexico along with its single "Como la Flor". Entre a Mi Mundo became the first Tejano recording by a female artist to sell over 300,000 copies, (Note: According to a book written by Stacy Lee, she reported sales of 300,000 units (excluding Mexico), while María Celeste Arrarás wrote in her book that the album sold 385,000 units in Mexico.) and was the best-selling Regional Mexican Album of 1993, it also ranks second on the Regional Mexican Albums All-time chart.

In 1993, Selena released Live, which contained three studio tracks. Live won Selena a Grammy and peaked at number two on the newly formed U.S. Billboard Top Latin Albums chart and was certified gold by the Recording Industry Association of America (RIAA) for shipments of 500,000 copies. Selena released Amor Prohibido in March 1994; it was certified double Diamond by the RIAA, denoting shipments of two million copies in the United States. Additionally, the album spawned four consecutive US Latin number-one singles. By December 1994, Amor Prohibido became the second Tejano recording to achieve year-end sales of 500,000 copies. It was considered her "biggest album" and was credited with popularizing Tejano music among a younger and wider audience than any time in the genre's history. With Amor Prohibido, Selena was considered "bigger than Tejano itself", and broke barriers in the Latin music world. This prompted EMI to begin marketing Selena as an American pop artist, believing she had reached her peak in the Latin music market. The singer recorded four tracks slated for what would have been her English-language crossover album by March 1995. On March 31, 1995, Selena was shot dead by Yolanda Saldívar, her friend and a former employee of her Selena Etc. boutiques over disputed embezzlement claims.

EMI Records and EMI Latin jointly released Dreaming of You in July 1995. It sold 175,000 copies its first day of release, a then-record for a female vocalist. Dreaming of You debuted on top the Billboard 200 chart with 331,000 units sold its first week, the second largest first-week sales for a female musician. Dreaming of You became the first and to date the only predominantly Spanish-language album to debut and peak at number one on the Billboard 200 chart. Dreaming of You was among the top ten best-selling debuts for a musician, best-selling debut by a female act, and was the fastest-selling U.S. album in 1995. Dreaming of You went on to become the best-selling Latin and Latin pop album for two consecutive years. At the time, Dreaming of You helped Selena to become the fastest-selling female act in recorded music history, and has since been ranked among the best and most important recordings produced during the rock and roll era. With Dreaming of You peaking at number one, Tejano music entered the mainstream English market. As of January 2015, Dreaming of You has sold five million copies worldwide, and remains the best-selling Latin album of all-time in the United States. Since Selena's death, there have been twenty-three posthumous releases with the most recent, Lo Mejor de...Selena, released on the twentieth anniversary of her death.

== Studio albums ==
=== Selena y Los Dinos ===
List of studio albums, with selected details
Title	Album details
Selena y Los Dinos	Released: July 16, 1984; Label: Freddie Records; Format: LP, cassette, CD
Alpha	Released: June 11, 1986; Label: GP Productions; Format: LP, cassette, CD
Muñequito de Trapo	Released: June 29, 1986; Label: GP Productions; Format: LP, cassette, CD
And the Winner Is...	Released: May 26, 1987; Label: GP Productions; Formats: LP, cassette, CD
Preciosa	Released: October 10, 1988; Label: RP Records; Format: LP, cassette, CD
Dulce Amor	Released: December 24, 1988; Label: RP Records; Format: LP, cassette, CD
"—" denotes a recording that did not chart, ineligible, or was not released in that territory.

=== Selena ===
List of studio albums, with selected chart positions, sales and certifications
Title	Album details	Peak chart positions				Certifications	Sales
Title	Album details	US	US Latin	MEX Reg.	CAN	Certifications	Sales
Selena	Released: October 17, 1989; Label: EMI Latin; Format: LP, cassette, CD	—	—	7	—	RIAA: Gold (Latin)	
Ven Conmigo	Released: October 6, 1990; Label: EMI Latin; Format: LP, cassette, CD	—	—	3	—	RIAA: 4× Platinum (Latin)	US: 500,000
Entre a Mi Mundo	Released: May 6, 1992; Label: EMI Latin; Format: LP, cassette, CD	97	4	1	—	RIAA: Diamond (Latin)	US: 600,000
Amor Prohibido	Released: March 13, 1994; Label: EMI Latin; Formats: LP, cassette, CD	29	1	1	—	RIAA: 41× Platinum (Latin)	US: 1,246,000
Dreaming of You	Released: July 18, 1995; Label: EMI EMI Latin; Format: LP, cassette, CD	1	1	—	16	RIAA: 62× Platinum (Latin); AMPROFON: Gold; MC: Gold	US: 2,942,000; World: 5,000,000
"—" denotes a recording that did not chart, ineligible, or was not released in that territory.

== Soundtrack albums ==
List of soundtracks, with selected chart positions, sales and certifications
Title	Album details	Peak chart positions		Certifications	Sales
Title	Album details	US	CAN	Certifications	Sales
Selena: The Original Motion Picture Soundtrack	Released: March 11, 1997; Label: EMI Latin; Format: Cassette, CD	7	36	RIAA: Platinum	US: 1,600,000
Selena: The Series Soundtrack	Released: December 4, 2020; Label: Capitol Latin; Format: Digital	—	—		

== Live albums ==
List of live albums, with selected chart positions, sales and certifications
Title	Album details	Peak chart positions			Certifications
Title	Album details	US	US Latin	MEX Reg.	Certifications
Selena Live!	Released: May 4, 1993; Label: EMI Latin; Format: LP, cassette, CD	79	2	1	RIAA: Gold
Live! The Last Concert	Released: March 27, 2001; Label: EMI Latin; Format: Cassette, CD	176	2	—	RIAA: 5× Platinum (Latin)
Unforgettable: The Live Album	Released: March 29, 2005; Label: EMI Latin; Format: CD	—	26	14	
"—" denotes a recording that did not chart, ineligible, or was not released in that territory.

== Compilation albums ==
List of compilation albums, with selected chart positions, sales and certifications
Title	Album details	Peak chart positions			Certifications	Sales
Title	Album details	US	US Latin	MEX Reg.	Certifications	Sales
16 Super Éxitos Originales	Released: 1990; Label: EMI Latin; Format: LP, cassette, CD	—	—	22		
Personal Best	Released: July 1, 1991; Label: Sony Music Distribution; Format: LP, cassette, CD	—	—	—		
Entertainers of the Year	Released: 1992; Label: EMI Latin; Format: LP, cassette, CD	—	—	—		
Mis Mejores Canciones – 17 Super Éxitos	Released: August 24, 1993; Label: EMI Latin; Format: LP, cassette, CD	—	—	—	RIAA: Diamond (Latin)	
Selena	Released: 1994; Label: EMI Latin; Format: LP, cassette, CD	—	—	—		
12 Super Éxitos	Released: October 18, 1994; Label: EMI Latin; Format: LP, cassette, CD	64	2	2	RIAA: Gold	
Las Reinas del Pueblo	Released: April 4, 1995; Label: EMI Latin; Format: LP, cassette, CD	147	5	5		
Musipistas: 10 Éxitos de Selena	Released: June 23, 1995; Label: EMI Latin; Format: LP, cassette, CD	—	—	—		
Éxitos y Recuerdos	Released: August 19, 1996; Label: Madacy Special Markets; Format: LP, cassette, CD	—	13	7		
All My Hits: Todos Mis Éxitos	Released: March 9, 1999; Label: EMI Latin; Format: Cassette, CD	54	1	1	RIAA: Diamond (Latin)	US: 456,000; CAN: 100,000
All My Hits: Todos Mis Éxitos Vol. 2	Released: February 29, 2000; Label: EMI Latin; Format: Cassette, CD	149	1	1	RIAA: 2× Platinum (Latin)	US: 34,493 (Note: The album debuted with 10,500 units on March 18, 2000. It sold an additional 8,000 units following the fifth anniversary of the singer's death on April 15, 2000, which was the second consecutive week it sold 8,000 units. The album sold 17 units less than the number one album of the week of April 22, 2000, bringing total (availability reported) sales to 34,493.)
Ones	Released: October 1, 2002; Label: EMI Latin; Format: Cassette, CD	42	2	—	RIAA: 18× Platinum (Latin)	US: 400,000
Greatest Hits	Released: June 24, 2003; Label: EMI Latin; Format: CD	117	—	—	—: RIAA: 4× Platinum (Latin)	
Momentos Intimos	Released: March 23, 2004; Label: EMI Latin; Format: CD	—	11	7		
Remembered	Released: January 25, 2005; Label: EMI Latin; Format: CD	—	61	—		
Dos Historias	Released: February 26, 2006; Label: Univision Records; Format: CD	—	21	3		
Through the Years / A Traves de los Años	Released: April 3, 2007; Label: EMI Latin; Format: CD	—	28	13		
Serie Verde	Released: September 25, 2007; Label: Madacy Special Markets; Format: CD	—	—	—		
10 Great Songs	Released: June 14, 2011; Label: EMI Latin; Format: CD	—	—	—		
Lo Mejor de...Selena	Released: March 31, 2015; Label: EMI Latin	102	2	2	RIAA: Platinum	US: 42,000
"—" denotes a recording that did not chart, ineligible, or was not released in that territory.

== Box sets ==
List of box sets, with selected chart positions, sales and certifications
Title	Album details	Peak chart positions			Sales	Certifications
Title	Album details	US	US Latin	MEX Reg.	Sales	Certifications
Anthology	Released: April 7, 1998; Label: EMI Latin; Format: Cassette, CD	131	1	1	US: 116,000	RIAA: 10× Platinum (Latin)
Unforgettable: Ultimate Edition	Released: April 5, 2005; Label: EMI Latin; Format: CD	—	—	—		RIAA: Platinum (Latin)
La Leyenda	Released: March 9, 2010; Label: EMI Latin; Format: CD	—	7	4		RIAA: Platinum (Latin)
"—" denotes a recording that did not chart, ineligible, or was not released in that territory.

== Remix albums ==
List of remix albums, with selected chart positions, sales and certifications
Title	Album details	Peak chart positions			Certifications
Title	Album details	US	US Latin	MEX Reg.	Certifications
Siempre Selena	Released: November 5, 1996; Label: EMI Latin; Format: cassette, CD	82	1	1	RIAA: 2× Platinum (Latin)
Enamorada de Ti	Released: April 3, 2012; Label: EMI Latin; Format: CD, digital download	135	1	1	RIAA: Gold (Latin)
Moonchild Mixes	Released: August 26, 2022; Label: Warner Latin; Format: Cassette, CD, digital download, LP, streaming	—	8	2	—
"—" denotes a recording that did not chart, ineligible, or was not released in that territory.

== See also ==
- List of best-selling Latin albums in the United States
- List of best-selling Latin albums
- List of best-selling Latin music artists
- List of songs recorded by Selena
- Selena singles discography
- Selena videography

== Sources ==
- The 1996 World Book Year Book: The Annual Supplement to the World Book Encyclopedia: A Review of the Events of 1995. Chicago, IL: World Book. 1996. ISBN 0-7166-0496-5.
- Arrarás, María Celeste (1997). Selena's Secret: The Revealing Story Behind Her Tragic Death. New York, NY: Simon and Schuster. ISBN 0-684-83193-7.
- Burr, Ramiro (1999). The Billboard Guide to Tejano and Regional Mexican Music. New York, NY: Billboard books. ISBN 0-8230-7691-1.
- Candelaria, Cordelia (2004). Encyclopedia of Latino Popular Culture, Volume 1. Westport, CT: Greenwood Publishing Group. ISBN 0-313-33210-X.
- Cohen, Norm (2007). Ethnic and Border Music: A Regional Exploration. Westport, CT: Greenwood Press. ISBN 978-0-313-33192-3.
- Doeden, Matt (2012). American Latin Music: Rumba Rhythms, Bossa Nova, and the Salsa Sound. Minneapolis, MN: Twenty-First Century Books. ISBN 978-1-4677-0147-1.
- Heatley, Michael (2008). Where Were You When...The Music Played?: 120 Unforgettable Moments in Music History. Pleasantville, NY: Reader's Digest Association. ISBN 978-0-7621-0988-3.
- Jasinski, Laurie E. (2012). Handbook of Texas Music. Denton, TX: Texas A&M University Press. ISBN 978-0-87611-297-7.
- Lomelí, Francisco A.; Ikas, Karen (2000). U.S. Latino Literatures and Cultures: Transnational Perspectives. Heidelberg: C. Winter. ISBN 3-8253-1065-5.
- Malone, Bill C. (2003). Southern Music/American Music. Lexington, KY: University Press of Kentucky. ISBN 0-8131-2635-5.
- Miguel, Guadalupe San (2002). Tejano Proud: Tex-Mex Music in the Twentieth Century. College Station, TX: Texas A&M University Press. ISBN 1-58544-188-0. - Read online, registration required
- Patoski, Joe Nick (1996). Selena: Como La Flor. Boston, MA: Little Brown and Company. ISBN 0-316-69378-2.
- Peña, Manuel (2002). Música Tejana: The Cultural Economy of Artistic Transformation. College Station, TX: Texas A&M University Press. ISBN 0-89096-888-8.
- Pollock, Bruce (2014). Rock Song Index: The 7500 Most Important Songs for the Rock and Roll Era (2 ed.). New York, NY: Routledge. ASIN B00J4JH50G.
- Stacy, Lee (2002). Mexico and the United States. Marshall Cavendish. ISBN 0-7614-7402-1.
- Stavans, Ilan (1998). The Riddle of Cantinflas Essays on Hispanic Popular Culture (1st ed.). Albuquerque, NM: University of New Mexico Press. ISBN 0-8263-5257-X.
- Sickels, Robert C. (2013). 100 Entertainers Who Changed America: An Encyclopedia of Pop Culture Luminaries. Santa Barbara, CA: ABC-CLIO. ISBN 978-1-59884-831-1.
- Untiedt, Kenneth L. (2013). Cowboys, Cops, Killers, and Ghosts: Legends and Lore in Texas. Denton, TX: University of North Texas Press. ISBN 978-1-57441-532-2.
