= Tribute (magazine) =

Entertainment industry magazine

- Distributors: Empire Theatres, AMC Theatres, Landmark Cinemas, Cinemark, Rainbow CInemas, Stinson Theatres, Guzzo Cinemas, Cine Entreprise
- Categories: Entertainment
- Frequency: 6 times per year
- Circulation: 500,000
- Founded: 1981
- Company: Tribute Entertainment Media Group
- Country: Canada
- Based in: Toronto, Ontario
- Language: English
- Website: Tribute.ca, Tribute Movies

Tribute is a Canadian entertainment industry magazine published by Tribute Entertainment Media Group that covers film, television, music, pop culture, celebrity lifestyle: beauty and fashion, and red carpet premieres. The magazine is read by over 1,500,000 and is distributed in Canadian theaters six times a year with a circulation of 500,000. Tribute features coverage of the latest news in Hollywood, film previews, fashion, gossip, movie-related books, music, trivia and feature contests. Tribute has provided coverage of the Toronto International Film Festival for more than 15 years.

== History ==
Founded in 1980, Tribute magazine was first published in 1981 with the cover featuring the movie Reds.

== Typical content ==
The magazine features celebrities on the cover and the most exciting movies opening each month. It publishes several "double issues" each year (March/April, May/June, July/August, and October/November) that are available in major theaters across the country.

== Monthly features/sections of the magazine ==
- Previews/must-see movies: A look at upcoming and current movies in theaters. Special issues cover holiday movies and summer blockbusters.
- Flash: Coverage of red carpet events.
- Cover Story: Featuring a major movie or celebrity.
- Interview: Exclusive interview with an actor or director.
- New in Beauty/Grooming: The latest in celebrity beauty trends for women and men.
- Sex Degrees: A fun look at who has and/or is dating whom in Hollywood.
- Trivia/crossword: Movie related puzzles and trivia questions.
- Push Play: Featuring new DVD releases.
- Horoscope: Your monthly horoscope plus a celebrity horoscope of the month.
- Web Watch: All the latest features
