= Bidi Bidi Bom Bom =

Single by Selena

from the album Amor Prohibido
- A-side: "Amor Prohibido"
- Released: July 31, 1994
- Recorded: 1993
- Studio: AMEN Studios (San Antonio, TX)
- Genre: Mexican cumbia; Latin pop; reggae fusion
- Length: 3:29
- Label: EMI Latin
- Songwriters: Selena Quintanilla-Pérez; Pete Astudillo
- Producer: A.B. Quintanilla III

Selena singles chronology
"Amor Prohibido" (1994)	"Bidi Bidi Bom Bom" (1994)	"No Me Queda Más" (1994)

Alternative cover
- Mexican release

Music video
- "Bidi Bidi Bom Bom" on YouTube

"Bidi Bidi Bom Bom" is a song recorded by American Tejano singer Selena. It was released as the second single from her fourth album, Amor Prohibido (1994). Originally written about a cheerful fish swimming freely in the ocean, the song's title is an onomatopoeic phrase suggesting the palpitating heartbeat of a person lovestruck by the object of their affection. "Bidi Bidi Bom Bom" was written by Selena and her backup vocalist and dancer Pete Astudillo.

"Bidi Bidi Bom Bom" is a Mexican cumbia pop song with rock en español and reggae influences. It received widespread acclaim for its musically diverse sounds, and the effects it had on listeners. The single peaked at number one on the United States Billboard Hot Latin Songs chart and remained there for four consecutive weeks, the singer's second consecutive number one single. Selena began dominating the Latin music charts, and "Bidi Bidi Bom Bom" contributed to her commercial success. It is believed by musicologist Ilan Stavans to have marked the beginning of the dominance of Latin pop, and was a bridge to the Tejano market. The song is considered to be one of the best compositions recorded by Selena, one of her most popular recordings, and has been cited as one of her signature songs. Her Astrodome concert performance of the song has been called one of the highlights of her musical career. "Bidi Bidi Bom Bom" was ranked at number 54 on the list of the Best Texas Songs of All-time, and given honorable mention as one of the top ten best Tejano recordings of all-time.

After Selena was killed in 1995, the song's title became a popular verb to describe a fan's admiration for the singer. "Bidi Bidi Bom Bom" won the Tejano Music Award for Song of the Year, while Broadcast Music Inc. recognized it as the most played Latin song of 1996. Since Billboard began monitoring music downloads in 2010, "Bidi Bidi Bom Bom" has remained on the Regional Mexican Digital Songs chart for 280 non-consecutive weeks, second to the number of consecutive weeks for her 1992 single "Como la Flor". Many musicians have since recorded the song or performed it as a tribute to the singer including: Jennifer Lopez, Selena Gomez, Alejandra Guzmán, Kat Von D, and Jennifer Peña.

== Background and writing ==
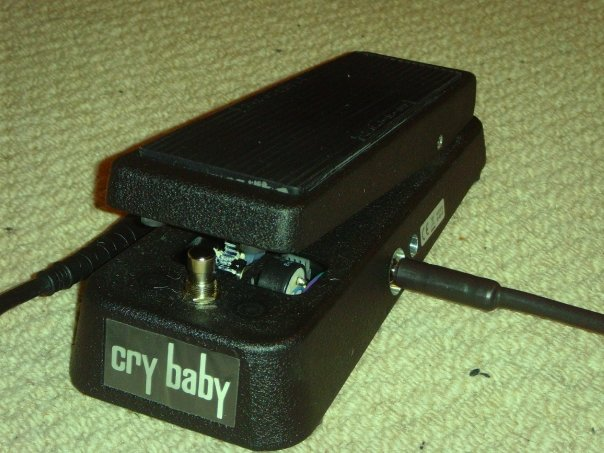
The crybaby (pictured) riff that Selena's husband Chris Pérez performed, became the musical foundation of "Bidi Bidi Bom Bom".

"Bidi Bidi Bom Bom" originated at her band's rehearsals starting off as an improvised song with few if any lyrics. According to Selena's brother, and principal music producer A.B. Quintanilla, the song came about shortly after Chris Pérez was hired as the band's guitarist in 1989 . A.B. spoke out against the "filler songs" that their father and manager Abraham Quintanilla, Jr. wanted on their recordings, and began playing a groove that gradually became a song. Suzette Quintanilla, the band's drummer, said "we were goofing off" and insisted that after A.B. began playing on his guitar, Selena started singing, coming up with lyrics "as ideas came to her". Pérez, who later eloped with Selena in 1992, wrote that the lyrics Selena came up with were unfamiliar to him despite the singer's habit of spontaneously writing ideas in a notebook and leaving it "wherever around the house". The song was originally used for soundchecks during the band's rehearsals and was then transformed into a short recording by Selena about a cheerful fish swimming freely in the ocean. Pérez said that what was then called "Little Bidi Bubbles" came easily "for everyone in the band." In a 2002 interview he said that he played a riff using a crybaby (which gave off a wah-wah sound) and that A.B. gave him a "look" that suggested he was impressed with the sound that he had improvised. The riff became the basis of the song before the writing process began.

Before A.B. began co-writing, Selena and backup vocalist Pete Astudillo were in the process of writing the song in Spanish. A.B., who arranged the piece with Roger Emerson, said in a 2002 interview that "it was kinda a little scary" because the song "had never been done or seen before". "Bidi Bidi Bom Bom" served as the second single released from Amor Prohibido on July 31, 1994. A.B. confessed to wanting the song released as the lead single but found that Selena and EMI Latin pushed for the title track instead.

== Composition and lyrical content ==
"Bidi Bidi Bom Bom"
A 20 second sample of "Bidi Bidi Bom Bom" where the crybaby's wah-wah sound can be heard along with the musical diversity of the recording. In the sample, Selena sings of her heart palpitating for a man who walked by her.

"Bidi Bidi Bom Bom" is a Spanish-language upbeat, cumbia pop song with rock en español and reggae influences. It is set in common time, and makes use of electric guitar riffs and ostanti percussions influenced by Colombian and Caribbean music. The song uses "richer" scoring, less-driven synthesizers, and treble-heavy arrangements than the first four songs on Amor Prohibido. The song is written in the key of B-flat major and is played in a moderate groove of 90 beats per minute. The song's chord progression has a basic form I-IV-V-IV, an ostinato (repetitive beat) that continues through its verses and chorus. Ramiro Burr of Billboard magazine called the song a "reggae-tinged tune" and suggested that it could have worked well with French lyrics. Writing for Billboard, Paul Verna called the recording a "spunky cumbia". In his book Encyclopedia of Recorded Sound, Frank Hoffman called the song "reggae-inflected dance fare". Mexican newspaper Milenio, enjoyed the track's fusion of cumbia and reggae sounds.

According to author José E. Limón, the song consists of "playful cumbia-rhythms" with lyrics speaking of "young kids falling in love". In "Bidi Bidi Bom Bom", Selena is overwhelmed and lovestruck by a man who happened to walk near her. The onomatopoeic title suggests the sound of a heart palpitating when a person longs to be the protagonist's object of affection. Italian essayists Gaetano Prampolini and Annamaria Pinazzi called the song a "happy love story", which is contradicted by Maria Celeste Arraras, in her 1997 book Selena's Secrets, who feels the song is about unrequited love. Bob Smithouser and Bob Waliszewski wrote in Chart Watch that "Bidi Bidi Bom Bom" explores a volatile relationship. Texas Monthly editor Joe Nick Patoski asserted the lyrics are: "about a boy who makes a girl's heart go thump-thump-thump". "Bidi Bidi Bom Bom" is musically similar to Selena's 1994 song "El Chico del Apartamento 512"; author James E. Perone called them recurring themes where the protagonist is "attracted to a young man". Bill Ramsey of the San Antonio Current, noted how the lyrics were an "innocuous ditty". Ashley Velez of Neon Tommy believed that most people who "ever had a crush" are able to relate to the palpitations of "Bidi Bidi Bom Bom".

== Reception ==
=== Critical response ===
At the time of its release, "Bidi Bidi Bom Bom" was a favorite of Selena's younger fan base. Posthumous reviews have cited the song as being "catchy". Ramiro Burr of Billboard magazine believed that the song could have easily been successful in European clubs thanks to its striking resemblance to Euro-pop and Eurodance songs that were popular in Europe at the time. Tom Whitehurst Jr. of the Corpus Christi Caller Times wrote that he did not know what "Bidi Bidi Bom Bom" meant but, after a friend played him a tape of the recording, he became a fan of the singer. Andrew Mitchell, also from the Corpus Christi Caller Times, called the song "happy" and said that it was "only natural to want to know the meaning of [the song], not just memorize [the] lyrics to sing along. Music can teach. It can remove barriers of the mind and soul." Joey Guerra of the Houston Chronicle, called the song "bouncy". Musicologists Ilan Stavans and Harold Augenbraum called "Bidi Bidi Bom Bom", "No Me Queda Más", and "Techno Cumbia" the "key hits of [Amor Prohibido]". Peter Watrous of The New York Times called the song "lightweight" but found it to be: "better than [Selena's English-language recordings]". Sue Anne Pressley of The Washington Post wrote that "Bidi Bidi Bom Bom" was "sprightly carefree", and "infectious". Writing for the San Antonio Express-News, Michael Clark complimented A.B.'s addition of "world-music flourishes" to the song. Katherine Seligman, also from the San Antonio Express News, described the recording as an: "infectiously happy song". Sun Sentinel contributor, Steve Bennett also called the recording "infectious".

Author Veda Boyd Jones wrote that "Bidi Bidi Bom Bom" is a: "catchy song with nonsensical words". This was echoed by Joe Nick Patoski in his book, Texas Monthly on Texas Women, where he called Selena "savvy enough" to record a song that has a "catchy", "nonsensical but eminently hummable" melody. According to Ed Morales who wrote in his book The Latin Beat, "Bidi Bidi Bom Bom" is an easily "forgettable throwaway" for the average listener, but found the it "catchy" and said it "sticks in your gut". The Spanish-language magazine Personajes, enjoyed the song's ability to "make everyone dance". Jessica Lucia Roiz of the Latin Times called the recording a "happy-go-lucky tune". John LaFollette of The Monitor called the track "playful". Marjua Estevez of Vibe called it a: "sassy dance track". Eliza Thompson of Cosmopolitan asserted that Selena's songs—particularly "Bidi Bidi Bom Bom"—resonate a "fun atmosphere". Canadian magazine Tribute, called "Bidi Bidi Bom Bom" an "upbeat hit". Writing for Out magazine, Xorje Olivares explained how "universal" it is, and "that you can't help but feel nostalgic" after listening to a few notes of "Bidi Bidi Bom Bom". John Dyzer of Entertainment Weekly, called the song a "beach-blanket anthem" and a "novelty hit". Dita Quinones of NBC San Diego, called it a "feel-good spirit" track. Ashley Velez called "Bidi Bidi Bom Bom" a "feel good song" and noted how the "fun [track]" is "one of Selena's most memorable contributions to the Latin music world." According to Mario Tarradell of the Dallas Morning News, the song contains the "bubbly, effervescent personality, the chica-del-barrio (the girl from the barrio) charm" in her recording, and believed the remixed version, found on the posthumous release Dreaming of You, was done so that it was "palatable club play". Taradell believed that remixing the song was fruitless, claiming that cumbia music is "more danceable" than reggae.

"Bidi Bidi Bom Bom" was ranked number 54 on the Dallas Observer's list of the Best Texas Songs of All-time. It was listed as an honorable mention of the top ten best Tejano songs of all-time by Ramiro Burr. Warta Ekonomi, an Indonesian business-focus magazine, named "Bidi Bidi Bom Bom" one of the top Spanish-language songs of 1995. Cosmopolitan ranked the song first among their top ten best songs for a summer BBQ, and ranked the song atop their list of the best Latin songs: "you forgot you were obsessed with." Since its release, the song has been included on many music critics "best of Selena songs" lists including the Latino Post (at number three), OC Weekly (at number three), BuzzFeed (at number three), Latina (at number four), and Neon Tommy (at number one).

=== Commercial performance ===
"Bidi Bidi Bom Bom" debuted at number 30 on August 13, 1994 on the United States Billboard Hot Latin Songs chart. In its eleventh week, it peaked at number one; her second as a solo artist. John Lannert wrote that in its second week atop the Hot Latin Songs chart, "Bidi Bidi Bom Bom" had "no challenger in sight". In an October 1994 report, the song was the second most played song in Los Angeles, fifth most played song in New York City, sixth most played recording in San Francisco, and ninth most played in Washington, D.C., on Latin music radio stations. In its third week atop the Hot Latin Songs chart, Billboard announced that its new airplay measuring system for the music chart would be based on Nielsen ratings beginning with the November 12, 1994 issue. Nonetheless, Lannert predicted that "Bidi Bidi Bom Bom" would remain atop the Hot Latin Songs chart and, during the first week the Nielsen rating system was used it did so, while Selena's song "No Me Queda Más" debuted at number 40. "Bidi Bidi Bom Bom" fell to the third slot on the Hot Latin Songs chart in its fifteenth week. In the following week, "No Me Queda Más" took the fifth slot while "Bidi Bidi Bom Bom" fell to the sixth position on the Hot Latin Songs chart the week of November 26, 1994. After spending 20 weeks on the Hot Latin Songs chart, and peaking at number one for four consecutive weeks, the song finished the year as the seventh best-performing single on the chart. "Bidi Bidi Bom Bom" re-entered the Hot Latin Songs chart on January 14, 1995 (after a week's departure from the chart) at number 30.

Selena was shot and killed by Yolanda Saldívar on March 31, 1995. Four of her singles, "No Me Queda Más", "Bidi Bidi Bom Bom", "Como la Flor", and "Amor Prohibido", re-entered Billboard magazine's Hot Latin Tracks and the Regional Mexican Airplay chart on April 15, 1995. "Bidi Bidi Bom Bom" was positioned at number six the week of April 15, 1995, and remained on the chart for an additional three weeks. Billboard magazine posthumously named Selena the Top Latin Artist of the 1990s the result of her fourteen top-ten singles on the Hot Latin Songs chart (including seven number-one hits). On the now defunct TouchTunes chart, which monitored airplay spins, "Bidi Bidi Bom Bom" remained on the chart for 181 weeks before Billboard ended its run in 2003. Billboard magazine began monitoring digital downloads of Latin songs the week ending January 23, 2010. "Bidi Bidi Bom Bom" made its debut on the newly formed digital genre-specific charts following the fifteenth anniversary of the singer's death; positioned at number 48 on the Latin Digital Songs chart and number 23 on the Latin Pop Digital Songs chart. The song did not debut on the Regional Mexican Digital Songs chart until the week ending on September 4, 2010, debuting at number ten. "Bidi Bidi Bom Bom" peaked at number one on the Regional Mexican Digital Songs chart in the week ending March 19, 2011, staying atop the chart for four consecutive weeks. In the week ending April 9, 2012, "Bidi Bidi Bom Bom" sold over 2,000 digital units after the unveiling of a U.S. postage stamp with a portrait of the singer. The song has remained on the Regional Mexican Digital Songs chart for 280 non-consecutive weeks, second behind Selena's "Como la Flor" with 323 consecutive weeks.

== Music video ==
=== Background and development ===
The music video for "Bidi Bidi Bom Bom" was filmed from 28 to 30 April 1994 and was directed by Cecilia Miniucchi. The video was shot in Santa Monica, California at the Santa Monica Pier. On 10 May, it premiered on the major television channels in Latin America. Produced by Tango Productions, Philip Holahan served as the director of photography, while editing was done by Clayton Halsey. Fans were asked to volunteer as backup dancers and random people during some takes of the video. EMI had a casting call for a handsome guy to be Selena's crush. Selena wore summer-clothing, bottom-styles depicting an Indian woman.

The music video opens up with fans throwing their hands up high in the sky, while Selena gently onto a pier, in slow-harmony "yeah". The video then transitions to Selena pumping gas into her Jeep Wrangler, watched by a handsome man nearby. Selena notices the man looking at her, then she looks away smiling. Meanwhile, she begins to sing the song "Bidi Bidi Bom Bom". She then says in Spanish, "I don't know what's going to happen next." They then meet at a traffic light, in their adjacent vehicles. A street-seller approaches the man to sell roses, and is successful, as he asks for one. The man then gives the roses to Selena and asks her (by gesturing with a nod of his head) to follow him. Selena's car signal then transitions to the man's direction, while she sings, "I can't control my heart, and it sings" (in Spanish). As she begins to follow the man's car, he moves his rear-view mirror to see Selena. They later appear at a festival and enjoy games together. Music solos begin, as the man wins a prize teddy bear and gives it as a gift to Selena. Videos of their relationship begin to play, now showing both enjoying various activities. At sunset, they leave the festival, laughing together. The video ends with a flashback scene to an alternate reality, where the street-seller is unsuccessful. The man decides not to buy the roses, resulting in him and Selena leaving in opposite directions.

=== Reception ===
The music video was welcomed with positive reception from music critics. In 2002, a snippet was featured on CBS's The Early Show with Julie Chen, while she interviewed Selena's family about the upcoming release of Ones (2002). On 4 March 2007, "Bidi Bidi Bom Bom" entered MTV Spain's Top20 MTV Selection at number 11. It climbed to No. 1 during the week of 31 March, the twelfth anniversary of Selena's death. Selena was featured on Fugues, an LGBT-related French magazine, during their "Top 10 Most Widely Played Songs in Gay Clubs in Canada". Fuegues editor, François Petit, said, "The music video for 'Bidi Bidi Bom Bom' was astonishing and greatly appreciated among French gays for its grooves and addicting lyrics, in nightclubs across Canada." It was positioned at number ten.

== Live performances ==
Some of Selena's performances of the song have since been regarded as highlights of her musical career. Ramiro Burr, of Billboard, called the singer's tour for her album Amor Prohibido a: "tour de force". Most notably, Selena's performance at the Houston Astrodome on February 26, 1995, has been called one of her best performances of the song. Selena's "leg kicks" at the Astrodome performance were replicated by Jennifer Lopez in the 1997 biopic film. Selena's performance on the Johnny Canales Show in 1994 was later released as part of the host's "favorite songs". Selena's performance of "Bidi Bidi Bom Bom" on July 31, 1994 at Six Flags AstroWorld was the subject of a video released by the Houston Chronicle for their segment "On This Forgotten Day". Selena also performed the track in a November 1994 episode of Sabado Gigante; the event was ranked among the most memorable moments of the show's 53-year history.

== Cultural impact ==
"Bidi Bidi Bom Bom" is considered to have been one of the best, most popular songs recorded by Selena, and is cited as one of her signature numbers. Selena dominated the Latin music charts in the United States in the early 1990s, with "Bidi Bidi Bom Bom", "Como la Flor", and "Amor Prohibido" contributing to her commercial success. According to musicologist Stavans, the three aforementioned singles were considered to have bridged and merged Tejano music and Latin pop thanks to the songs' popularity. This was reiterated by musicologist Michael Joseph Corcoran, who found that Tejano music "was a blend of two cultures" and Selena was "a bridge between them". Corcoran called the track a: "seamless blend of convex styles". Stavans further explains how the popularity of the singles shone a "brighter spotlight" on Tejano music and: "marked the beginning of the genre of Latin pop". He notes that Selena's contributions to Tejano music were "significant", because she adapted a new style of Tejano cumbia (or Mexican cumbia) with "Bidi Bidi Bom Bom". The song was recognized by Lori Beth Rodriguez in her guide to Tejano music as being responsible for catapulting Selena into fame. Authors Michelle Habell-Pallan and Mary Romero feel that "Bidi Bidi Bom Bom" "shook up" the historical boundaries of Tejano music's: "non-normative genders and sexualities to the symbolic periphery of the dance floor." During her tour in Mexico, the song "inundated the airwaves" in Veracruz.

As of 2016, "Bidi Bidi Bom Bom" continues to have strong radio airplay throughout the United States. The song remains a staple at Latin American quinceañeras, Hispanic weddings, and at Cinco de Mayo celebrations. The song has since become a popular verb to describe a fan's love for Selena. In April 2015, the city of San Antonio hosted a "Bidi Bidi Fun Run", a 5K marathon with proceeds being donated to the Selena Foundation which helps children in crisis. "Bidi Bidi Bom Bom" has been favored by the LGBTQ community and it was added to the set list for a Long Beach, California pride event in 2011. The song has received a number of awards and nominations including winning the Tejano Music Award for Song of the Year in 1995. Broadcast Music, Inc. (BMI) recognized "Bidi Bidi Bom Bom" at its Pop Music Awards as one of the most performed Latin songs of 1996. During the Tejano Music Awards decade-ballot ceremony, "Bidi Bidi Bom Bom" was recognized as the Best 1990s Song.

=== Cover versions and usage in media ===
Within two months of Selena's death, Astudillo performed the track during a Memorial Day concert held in Houston, Texas. American Tejano performer Jennifer Peña performed "Bidi Bidi Bom Bom" at a live event, impressing music executives. Peña became a professional singer after her performance of the song reached Selena's father Abraham, who signed the artist to Q-Productions. Sara Tavares covered the song in Portuguese for her album Mi Ma Bo (1999). In 2000, Veronica Vasquez was chosen to play Selena in the Selena Forever musical. Ricardo Baca of the Corpus Christi Caller Times, noted that the lyricist added "Bidi Bidi Bom Bom" (among others) because of its "strong sense of familiarity for her fans." Puerto Rican boy band Tick Tock covered the song, as well as releasing a music video to promote it in 2004. Mexican singer Tatiana recorded the song for the tribute album Mexico Recuerda a Selena (2005). Mexican rock singer Alejandra Guzmán performed and recorded "Bidi Bidi Bom Bom" for the live televised tribute concert Selena ¡VIVE! in April 2005. John Powell Metz of the Corpus Christi Caller Times, called Guzmán's version "spirited" and her performance of the song "risqué". Burr predicted in the Houston Chronicle that Guzmán would perform a "rock version" of the song for her performance at the Selena ¡VIVE! concert. Haitian singer Wyclef Jean sampled the song for his tribute to the singer on his album, Carnival Vol. II: Memoirs of an Immigrant (2007), featuring singer Melissa Jiménez on the track. Joey Guerra called the track a "disappointment" that "could-have-been [a] great tribute". He called the song a "cheesy show tune from the misguided musical chronicling the Tejano singer's life." Nonetheless he did enjoy hearing Jean sample the song. GRAMMY - Pro Associate Member artist at The Latin Recording Academy® Blanca Star Olivera recorded the song in her album New York Latin Hits - 2006. In 2007, Lole – Lolay recorded the song in Haitian Creole entitled "Sensation". Global Rhythm magazine called Lole — Lolay's version "playful" and an "Afro-Caribbean treat". Mexican singer Ely Guerra released her version of the song for the soundtrack film to Los Campeones de la Lucha Libre in 2008.

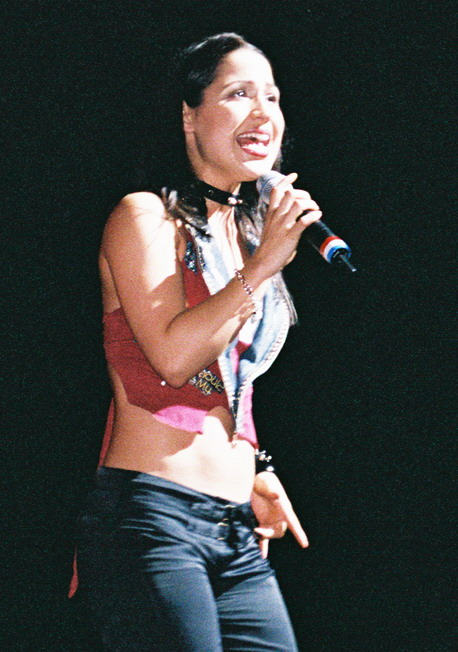
Jennifer Peña also performed the song during a live event which resulted her in being signed to Q-Productions to begin her music career.

American actress Ana Isabelle performed "Bidi Bidi Bom Bom" live during Univision's V.E.S. Show in 2009. American entertainer Selena Gomez performed the song during a 2010 Reliant Stadium concert. Guerra called her performance "spirited" and she later recorded the song as a duet with Selena for the 2012 remix album Enamorada de Ti. The Belfast Telegraph wrote that Gomez had done an "amazing job". At the Billboard Latin Music Awards in Miami, A.B. told E! that Gomez gave a "fantastic vocal performance on the record". Guerra, however, wrote that the new version of "Bidi Bidi Bom Bom" was "virtually the same arrangement as the original. It would have been more effective reshaped as a poppy club track." He found Gomez' vocals "curiously lackluster", as if she was "scared of the song" and "intimidated by her idol". Lovelace commented that it was "obvious that Spanish isn't Gomez' first language, and comes in a distant second", and that "Gomez' odd voice" came across as sometimes "much higher and very squeaky when speaking Spanish", concluding that it "doesn’t match the rest of the song and momentarily brings everything to a halt". Gomez later released the track on her greatest hits album, For You (2014). American singer-songwriter Jay Brannan recorded his version of the track for his 2013 extended play Around the World in 80 Jays. On America's Got Talent, mariachi singer Alondra Santos performed "Bidi Bidi Bom Bom" to rave reviews. Radio personality host Howard Stern, who had mocked Selena's mourners and poked fun at the singer's death in April 1995, praised Santos' performance. On May 1, 2015, Jennifer Lopez performed "A Selena Tribute" which included "Bidi Bidi Bom Bom". Lopez' performance was praised by music critics, who enjoyed the singer's Selena-esque costumes she wore onstage. Tattoo artist and reality television personality Kat Von D covered the song as a tribute to the singer in January 2016.

Jackie Guerra, who played Selena's sister in the 1997 biopic film, called "Bidi Bidi Bom Bom" her favorite song. Former U.S. senator Hillary Clinton used the recording for her 2016 presidential campaign in San Antonio, which was well received by Hispanics. Clinton played the song at the Sunset Station, where Selena recorded her music video for "No Me Queda Más".

The song has also been covered by T-Vice, a Kompa band from Haiti, under the title "Sensation (Bidi Bidi Bam Bam)" in their album Banm T-Vice Mwen in 1998.

== Track listing ==
US Single

1. "Bidi Bidi Bom Bom" – 4:14

Mexico Single

1. "Bidi Bidi Bom Bom" – 4:14

== Credits and personnel ==
All credits were taken from the album's liner notes.

- Selena – lead vocals, writer
- Pete Astudillo – co-writer
- Ricky Vela – lead keyboardist
- Joe Ojeda – keyboards
- Chris Pérez – guitar
- A.B. Quintanilla III – producer, arranger
- Roger Emerson – arranger

== Charts ==
=== Weekly charts ===
Chart (1994)	Peak position
US Hot Latin Songs (Billboard)	1
US Regional Mexican Airplay (Billboard)	4
US Latin Pop Airplay (Billboard)	11
Chart (2012)	Peak position
US Regional Mexican Airplay (Billboard) duet version with Selena Gomez	8

=== Year-end charts ===
Chart (1994)	Peak position
US Hot Latin Songs	7

== Certifications ==
Region	Certification	Certified units/sales
United States (RIAA)	9× Platinum (Latin)	540,000^{‡}
^{‡} Sales+streaming figures based on certification alone.

== See also ==
- Latin music in the United States
- List of number-one Billboard Hot Latin Tracks of 1994
- Billboard Top Latin Songs Year-End Chart
