= Last Dance/The Hustle/On the Radio =

Single by Selena

from the album Selena
- Released: January 25, 1997
- Recorded: February 26, 1995
- Studio: Astrodome (Houston, Texas)
- Genre: Latin; disco
- Label: EMI
- Songwriters: Paul Jabara; Van McCoy; Donna Summer
- Producers: A.B. Quintanilla III; Bebu Silvetti

Selena singles chronology
| "A Boy Like That" (1997) | "Last Dance/The Hustle/On the Radio" (1997) | "Is It the Beat?" (1997) |

Live video
- "Disco Medley" on YouTube

"Last Dance/The Hustle/On the Radio" is the second single released from the motion picture soundtrack Selena (1997). The medley was recorded live on February 26, 1995 at the Houston Astrodome. It became Selena's final live recording before she was murdered on March 31, 1995. It interpolates the songs "Last Dance" and "On the Radio" by Donna Summer, "The Hustle" by Van McCoy and the Soul City Symphony, and "I Will Survive" by Gloria Gaynor and "Funkytown" by Lipps Inc. The track reached number 25 on the Hot Latin Singles Chart.

== Chart performance ==
Chart performance for "Last Dance/The Hustle/On the Radio"
| Chart (1997) | Peak position |
|---|---|
| US Billboard Hot Latin Tracks | 25 |
| US Billboard Latin Pop Airplay | 8 |
