= Ones (album) =

Greatest hits album by Selena
- Released: October 1, 2002
- Recorded: 1990–1995
- Genre: Latin pop
- Length: 74:01
- Language: Spanish; English
- Label: EMI Latin
- Producer: A.B. Quintanilla III, Kike Santander, José Luis Arroyave, Jorge Alberto Pino, Sergio Minski, Guillermo J. Page, Andrés Felipe Silva

Selena chronology
Live! The Last Concert (2001)	Ones (2002)	Greatest Hits (2003)

Singles from Ones
- 1. "Con Tanto Amor Medley" Released: 2002

Re-release chronology
Selena: The Series Soundtrack (2020)	Ones (2021)	Moonchild Mixes (2022)

Ones (Spanish: Unos) is a compilation album by American singer Selena, released in the United States on October 1, 2002 by EMI Latin. It was released on November 11, 2002 in Spanish-speaking countries, while the limited edition included a bonus DVD of her music videos. Ones was released building on the popularity of the 1997 biographical film Selena. The album was aimed at Selena's new generation of fans, and its release marked the singer's twentieth year in the music industry. Ones features six number one singles namely, "Amor Prohibido", "Bidi Bidi Bom Bom", "No Me Queda Más", "Fotos y Recuerdos", and her duets with Álvaro Torres on "Buenos Amigos" and the Barrio Boyzz on "Donde Quiera Que Estés".

Selena's brother, A.B. Quintanilla, remixed three of her singles ("Amor Prohibido", "Como la Flor" and "Si Una Vez") into a medley mash-up entitled "Con Tanto Amor Medley", the same tracks found on the album. Ones received a positive reception among music critics, while Jon O'Brien of AllMusic noticed that the record label ignored Selena's self-titled debut album. The recording peaked at number two on the US Billboard Top Latin Albums and number one on the Latin Pop Albums charts. Ones peaked at number 42 on the Billboard 200 chart and was certified 18× platinum by the Recording Industry Association of America (RIAA), signifying 1,080,000 album-equivalent units sold in the United States.

== Background and release ==
On March 31, 1995, American Tejano music singer Selena was shot and killed by Yolanda Saldívar, her friend and former manager of her boutiques. The impact of the singer's death had a negative impact on Latin music, her genre—which she catapulted it into the mainstream market—suffered and its popularity waned following Selena's death. Following her death, the singer's commodity grew, as interest in Selena sparked a buying frenzy among Hispanic and Latino Americans. The singer's father and manager, Abraham Quintanilla Jr. was forced to release Selena (1997), a biopic on Selena's life and career, after two major film production companies were in the process of making their own films about Selena without the consent of the singer's family. The film's release introduced a new generation of fans and inspired her family to release a compilation album containing the singer's most popular songs. In an interview with Julie Chen, her family explained their intentions on releasing Ones as way to showcase who Selena was as a singer and a performer. They included a bonus DVD of Selena's music videos for those who never saw her in person.

The album was released as part of the singer's 20th anniversary in the music industry. EMI Latin re-released Selena's previous works, which were remastered and included bonus tracks, music videos, and spoken liner notes containing commentary and recollections from the singer's family, friends, and her band. Ones was released on October 1, 2002 by EMI Latin, while Unos was released in Spanish-speaking countries.

== Songs ==
Con Tanto Amor Medley
"Con Tanto Amor Medley" is a medley mashup of "Amor Prohibido", "Si Una Vez" and "Como la Flor". The recording features acoustic guitar and strings, as noted by music critics.

The singer's self-titled debut album was excluded from the tracklisting. The first of Selena's number ones to be featured on the album was her duet with Álvaro Torres on "Buenos Amigos". The song became the singer's first number one single in her career when it peaked at number one on the US Billboard Hot Latin Songs chart in June 1991. Two other songs were included from her second studio album Ven Conmigo (1990), of them were "No Quiero Saber" and "Baila Esta Cumbia". "Como la Flor", which became a career-launching single and the singer's signature song, was included on Ones, and together with "La Carcacha" were taken from Entre a Mi Mundo (1992). The singles from Selena's 1993 release Live!, made an appearance on the album as well. "No Debes Jugar", the lead single from Live!, was praised by critics for its distinguishable cumbia music sounds that ultimately became her trademark. The second single from Live!, "La Llamada", provided Selena her fourth top ten single.

Tracks from Selena's fourth studio album Amor Prohibido (1994), made up most of the tracklisting on Ones. The title track "Amor Prohibido" sampled the cencerro, which was intended by the singer's brother and record producer A.B. Quintanilla, to attract people of different ethnicities to Selena's music. "Bidi Bidi Bom Bom" became a popular song among the singer's younger fans, while posthumous reviews cited the song's catchiness and noted a sense of conviviality in the song. "No Me Queda Más", the third recording off of Amor Prohibido, was praised for the singer's vocal interpretations and her ability to tackle such a song reserved for established musicians twice her age. Another song from Amor Prohibido, "Fotos y Recuerdos", which sampled the Pretenders' 1983 single "Back on the Chain Gang", peaked at number one following Selena's death in April 1995. Other songs from Amor Prohibido including "El Chico del Apartamento 512", "Techno Cumbia", and "Si Una Vez", were included on Ones. Selena's duet with the Barrio Boyzz on their 1994 single "Donde Quiera Que Estés" is also featured on Ones, the track topped the Hot Latin Songs chart for six consecutive weeks. The singles "Tú Sólo Tú", "Siempre Hace Frio", "I Could Fall in Love", and "Dreaming of You", were released posthumously and were added to Ones. The latter two were shelved tracks intended for the Don Juan DeMarco (1995) soundtrack in which Selena made a cameo appearance. "I Could Fall in Love" and "Dreaming of You" were the only songs featured on Ones from the singer's intended crossover album Dreaming of You (1995).

== Reception and chart performance ==
Professional ratings
Review scores
Source	Rating
AllMusic	(mixed)
San Antonio Express-News	(favorable)

The album was met with positive reviews from music critics. Ramiro Burr of the San Antonio Express-News compared Ones to the greatest hits releases of Buddy Holly, Janis Joplin and Jimi Hendrix. Jon O'Brien of AllMusic noticed that the company intentionally wanted to focus on Selena's career between 1990 and 1995, ignoring her 1989 debut album. The iTunes editorial team found Ones as a showcase of the singer's versatile soprano voice that inspires one to dance or be brought with emotion. They noted a sense of intonation, "spine-chilling" vibrato, and coherency throughout the album. Jessica Roiz of Billboard found Ones to have contained several of the singer's most popular singles. Roiz listed several songs included in Ones on her list of songs recorded by Selena that are meant to help those who are going through a breakup. Ones was marketed through TV advertisements as a replacement to Selena's previous works, which were removed from distribution. The album's release coincided with VH1's Behind the Music episode of Selena, which first aired on October 2, 2002.

Ones debuted at number four on the US Billboard Top Latin Albums and Latin Pop Albums chart on the week ending October 19, 2002, the highest-debuting album that week. The album debuted at number 162 on the Billboard 200 chart, before peaking at number 159 on the week ending November 9, 2002. In a year-end report compiled by Nielsen SoundScan, Ones was named with other Latin music albums, to have end the slight decline in Latin music sales that plagued the United States in the first and second quarters of 2002. The recording was nominated for the Latin Greatest Hits Album of the Year at the 2003 Billboard Latin Music Awards. Ones ended 2003 as the 13th best-selling Latin album and ninth best-selling Latin pop album of the year. Ones reentered the Top Latin Albums chart the week of February 7, 2004 at number 74 before slipping off and reentering the chart the week of March 13 at number 65. On the chart's April 17, 2004 list, Ones rose to number 11, receiving the highest percentage gains for an album that week, which was followed by the singer's ninth anniversary of her death. The album remained on the chart until May 29, 2004. Ones was removed from Billboard's Top Latin Albums and Latin Pop Albums chart and began charting on the Top Latin Catalog Albums chart. On the April 19, 2009 chart, Ones rose 51-percent in sales and climbed 61-percent to number three on the Top Latin Catalog Albums chart, which was followed by the singer's 14th anniversary of her death. Ones ended up as the 88th best-selling Latin album of the 2000s decade.

On October 14, 2016, Ones was released on a limited edition purple double disc vinyl. The limited edition helped Ones debut and peak at number 70 on the Top Album Sales and number four on the Vinyl Albums chart. Ones also debuted on the Top Pop Catalog Albums chart, peaking at number seven. Following another revision to its Latin albums charts, Billboard removed its two-decade-long ban of catalog albums in its chart beginning with the February 11, 2017 list; Ones re-entered the Top Latin Albums and Latin Pop Albums chart after 15 years. After its revision, Ones claimed the number one position on the Latin Pop Albums chart within three weeks, dethroning CNCO's Primera Cita (2016). The album remained atop the Latin Pop Albums chart for six consecutive weeks and was displaced by Alejandro Fernandez' album Rompiendo Fronteras (2017) on April 8, 2017. Before its revision, Nielsen SoundScan reported that Ones sold 25,000 units in 2016; the seventh best-selling Latin album of the year, Ones was the best-selling Latin album by a woman in 2016. In 2017's mid-year report, Ones sold 42,000 album-equivalent units, while 13,000 were pure album sales, ranking as the seventh best-selling Latin album. In 2018's mid-year report, Ones sold 8,000 units and ranked as the tenth best-selling Latin album. On July 12, 2018, Ones reached number one on iTunes' Latin Albums chart, out-selling living musicians recent releases including Maluma's F.A.M.E. (2018), J Balvin's Vibras (2018), Ozuna's Odisea (2017), and Shakira's El Dorado (2017). The event was celebrated on the singer's official Facebook page while Billboard noticed that the album had reached its 140th week on their Top Latin Albums chart. Ones was certified platinum by the Recording Industry Association of America (RIAA) in February 2003, signifying that 100,000 units had been shipped in the United States. In November 2017 the RIAA recertified the album 18× platinum in the Latin field, denoting 1,080,000 album-equivalent units sold in the United States.

== Track listing ==
CD
No.	Title	Writer(s)	Original album	Length
1.	"No Quiero Saber"	Abraham Quintanilla III; Pete Astudillo	Ven Conmigo, 1990	2:56
2.	"Baila Esta Cumbia"	A. Quintanilla; Astudillo	Ven Conmigo	2:58
3.	"Como la Flor"	A. Quintanilla; Astudillo	Entre a Mi Mundo, 1992	3:05
4.	"La Carcacha"	A. Quintanilla; Astudillo	Entre a Mi Mundo	4:11
5.	"Buenos Amigos" (with Álvaro Torres)	Álvaro Torres	Nada Se Compara Contigo, 1991	4:47
6.	"No Debes Jugar"	A. Quintanilla; Ricky Vela	Live!, 1993	2:51
7.	"La Llamada"	A. Quintanilla; Astudillo	Live!	3:13
8.	"Amor Prohibido"	A. Quintanilla; Astudillo	Amor Prohibido, 1994	2:50
9.	"No Me Queda Más"	Vela	Amor Prohibido	3:20
10.	"Fotos y Recuerdos"	Chrissie Hynde	Amor Prohibido	2:36
11.	"El Chico del Apartamento 512"	A. Quintanilla; Vela	Amor Prohibido	3:29
12.	"Bidi Bidi Bom Bom"	Selena Quintanilla; Astudillo	Amor Prohibido	3:30
13.	"Techno Cumbia"	A. Quintanilla; Astudillo	Amor Prohibido	3:47
14.	"Si Una Vez"	A. Quintanilla; Astudillo	Amor Prohibido	2:46
15.	"Donde Quiera Que Estés" (featuring the Barrio Boyzz)	K. C. Porter; Miguel Flores	Donde Quiera Que Estés, 1993	4:29
16.	"Tú Sólo Tú"	Felipe Valdés Leal	Dreaming of You, 1995	3:15
17.	"Siempre Hace Frio"	Cuco Sánchez	Siempre Selena, 1996	3:16
18.	"I Could Fall in Love"	Keith Thomas	Dreaming of You	4:39
19.	"Dreaming of You"	Franne Golde; Tom Snow	Dreaming of You	5:14
20.	"Con Tanto Amor Medley" (Amor Prohibido / Si Una Vez / Como la Flor)	A. Quintanilla; Astudillo		7:07

DVD
No.	Title	Director(s)	Length
1.	"No Quiero Saber"		3:38
2.	"La Carcacha"	Cecilia Miniucchi	3:40
3.	"Buenos Amigos"		4:46
4.	"La Llamada"	Cecilia Miniucchi	3:12
5.	"Amor Prohibido"	Cecilia Miniucchi	2:53
6.	"No Me Queda Más"	Sean Davered	4:13
7.	"Bidi Bidi Bom Bom"	Cecilia Miniucchi	3:29
8.	"Techno Cumbia"		3:55
9.	"Donde Quiera Que Estes"	Laurice Bell	4:26
10.	"Tú, Sólo Tú"		3:16
11.	"Siempre Hace Frio"		3:08
12.	"I Could Fall in Love"	Hector Galan	4:29
13.	"Dreaming of You"	Doug Kluthe	4:24

== Personnel ==
Credits are taken from the album's liner notes.

Vocals

- Selena—main vocalist
- Álvaro Torres—guest artist
- Trey Lorenz—backing vocalist
- Lucy Perez—backing vocalist

Composers

- A.B. Quintanilla
- Pete Astudillo
- Miguel Flores
- Cliff Friend
- Franne Golde
- Chrissie Hynde
- Felipe Valdés Leal
- K. C. Porter
- Cuco Sánchez
- Tom Snow
- Keith Thomas
- Alvaro Torres
- Ricky Vela

Engineers

- Marcelo Añez
- Gregg Vickers
- José Luis Arroyave
- Juan Jose Virviescas

Instrumentals

- José Luis Arroyave—keyboards
- Kike Santander—keyboards
- Joe Ojeda—keyboards
- Manny López—guitar (nylon string)
- Chris Pérez—guitar
- Henry Gomez—guitar
- Tedoy Mullet—trumpet
- Arturo Meza—percussion
- Jesse "O'Jay" Martinez—percussion
- Suzette Quintanilla—drums
- Eliza Howardson—violin

Producers

- A.B. Quintanilla III
- José Luis Arroyave—programming
- Sergio Minski
- Guillermo J. Page
- Jorge Alberto Pino—executive producer
- Andrés Felipe Silva—executive director
- Kike Santander

== Charts ==
=== Weekly charts ===
Chart (2002)	Peak position
US Billboard 200	159
Chart (2016)	Peak position
US Top Album Sales	70
US Vinyl Albums	4
US Top Pop Catalog Albums	7
Chart (2017)	Peak position
US Billboard Top Latin Albums	2
US Billboard Latin Pop Albums	1
Chart (2021)	Peak position
US Billboard 200	42
US Billboard Catalog Albums	5

=== Quarterly charts ===
Chart (Q1 2003)	Position
US Top Latin Albums	9
Chart (Q2 2003)	Position
US Top Latin Albums	10

=== Year-end charts ===
Chart (2003)	Peak position
US Top Latin Albums	13
US Latin Pop Albums	9
Chart (2017)	Peak position
US Top Latin Albums	13
US Latin Pop Albums	3
Chart (2018)	Peak position
US Top Latin Albums	13
US Latin Pop Albums	2
Chart (2019)	Peak position
US Top Latin Albums	13
US Latin Pop Albums	2
Chart (2020)	Peak position
US Top Latin Albums	13
US Latin Pop Albums	1
Chart (2021)	Peak position
US Top Latin Albums	4
US Latin Pop Albums	1

=== Decade-end charts ===
Chart (2000–09)	Position
US Top Latin Albums	88
Chart (2010–19)	Position
US Top Latin Albums	32

== Certifications ==
Region	Certification	Certified units/sales
United States (RIAA)	18× Platinum (Latin)	1,080,000^{‡}
^{‡} Sales+streaming figures based on certification alone.

== See also ==
- 2002 in Latin music
- Selena albums discography
- List of number-one Billboard Latin Pop Albums from the 2010s
- Latin American music in the United States

== Works cited ==
- "Ones by Selena on Apple Music". iTunes. October 2002.
- "Selena > Chart history > Hot Latin Songs". Billboard.
- "RIAA Gold & Platinum". RIAA.com. Archived from the original on August 21, 2016.
- "Selena > Chart history > Top Latin Albums". Billboard.
- "A life cut short, potential unmet". Fort Worth Star Telegram. April 7, 1995. Archived from the original on October 25, 2012.
- "Top Latin Albums > 19 October 2002". Billboard. Vol. 114, no. 42. October 19, 2002.
- "Top Latin Albums > 9 November 2002". Billboard. Vol. 114, no. 45. November 9, 2002.
- "Billboard Latin Music Awards Finalist". Billboard. Vol. 115, no. 8. February 22, 2003.
- "Rapping up the Charts". Billboard. Vol. 115, no. 25. June 21, 2003.
- "Chart Recaps". Billboard. Vol. 115, no. 34. August 23, 2003.
- "Year-end charts > 2003". Billboard. Vol. 115, no. 52. December 27, 2003.
- "Top Latin Albums > 7 February 2004". Billboard. Vol. 116, no. 6. February 7, 2004.
- "Top Latin Albums > 13 March 2004". Billboard. Vol. 116, no. 11. March 13, 2004.
- "Top Latin Albums > 17 April 2004". Billboard. Vol. 116, no. 16. April 17, 2004.
- "Chart Tastemakers". Billboard. Vol. 116, no. 22. May 29, 2004.
- "Top Latin Catalog Albums > 18 April 2009". Billboard. Vol. 121, no. 15. April 18, 2009.
- "Decade-end charts 2000s: Top Latin Albums". Billboard. December 31, 2009. Archived from the original on July 17, 2018.
- "Top Album Sales > November 5, 2016". Billboard.
- "Vinyl Albums > November 5, 2016". Billboard.
- "Catalog Albums > November 5, 2016". Billboard.
- "Top Latin Albums > February 11, 2017". Billboard.
- "Latin Pop Albums > February 11, 2017". Billboard.
- "Latin Pop Albums > February 25, 2017". Billboard.
- "Latin Pop Albums > April 8, 2017". Billboard.
- "Year-end Charts > Top Latin Albums > 2017". Billboard.
- "Year-end Charts > Latin Pop Albums > 2017". Billboard.
- "Year-end Charts > Top Latin Albums > 2018". Billboard.
- "Year-end Charts > Latin Pop Albums > 2018". Billboard.
- "Year-end Charts > Top Latin Albums > 2019". Billboard.
- "Year-end Charts > Latin Pop Albums > 2019". Billboard.
- "Decade-end Charts 2010s: Top Latin Albums". Billboard. Archived from the original on March 7, 2021.
- "Year-end Charts > Top Latin Albums > 2020". Billboard.
- "Year-end Charts > Latin Pop Albums > 2020". Billboard.
- "Catalog Albums Chart > 22 May 2021". Billboard.
- Cobo, Leila (August 17, 2002a). "EMI Fuels Selena Legacy With Re-Issues". Billboard. Vol. 114, no. 33.
- Burr, Ramiro (March 31, 2005). "Selena Library". San Antonio Express-News.
- O'Brien, Jon. "Ones Review". AllMusic.
- "Billboard Latin Music Awards Finalist". Billboard. Vol. 115, no. 8. February 22, 2003.
- Cobo, Leila (December 28, 2002b). "The Year in Latin". Billboard. Vol. 114, no. 52.
- Roiz, Jessica. "5 Selena Quintanilla Songs to Heal a Broken Heart". Billboard.
- Malone, Bill C. (2003). Southern Music/American Music. Lexington, KY: University Press of Kentucky. ISBN 0-8131-2635-5.
- Tarradell, Mario (March 16, 1997). "Selena's Power: Culture Fusion". The Dallas Morning News.
- Lopetegui, Enrique (November 5, 2013). "Cumbia: How Colombia made Selena a star". San Antonio Current.
- Mitchell, Andrew (April 21, 2015). "Editorial: How to grow this city, not just economically". Corpus Christi Caller Times.
- Pressley, Sue Anne (October 12, 1995). "Defense Points to Role of Selena's Father in Dispute". Washington Post.
- Catlin, Roger (July 22, 1995). "Singer Selena Missed Her Dream of Crossover Success". Hartford Courant.
- Holston, Mark (September 1994). "Reviews: Music". Hispanic. Vol. 7, no. 8. p. 90. ISSN 0898-3097.
- Cole, Patrick E.; Farley, Christopher John (July 10, 1995). "Old Rock, New Life — Page 2". Time. Archived from the original on November 7, 2012.
- Chen, Julie (October 17, 2002). The Early Show. 5 minutes in. CBS.
- Morales, Tatiana (October 16, 2002). "Fans, Family Remember Selena". CBS News. CBS Interactive Inc. Archived from the original on May 15, 2013.
- Lannert, John (October 19, 2002). "Spanish Notas". Billboard. Vol. 42.
- Ones (Compact disc). Selena. EMI Latin. 2002. 724358022100.
- Jacobs, Sally (October 19, 1995). "The canonization of Selena The slain Tejano singer looms larger than life as her alleged killer stands trial". Boston Globe. Archived from the original on January 31, 2013.
- Arrarás, María Celeste (1997). Selena's Secret: The Revealing Story Behind Her Tragic Death. Simon and Schuster. ISBN 0-684-83193-7.
- Mendizabal, Amaya (January 31, 2017). "Maluma Achieves Rare Feat: Nos. 1 & 2 on Latin Airplay Chart". Billboard. Archived from the original on April 4, 2018.
- Cobo, Leila (January 6, 2017). "What Happened in Latin Music In 2016? Consumption Up, Market Divided". Billboard. Archived from the original on July 17, 2018.
- Caulfield, Keith (July 12, 2017). "Luis Fonsi & Daddy Yankee's 'Despacito,' Shakira's 'El Dorado' Rule Nielsen Music's Mid-Year 2017 Latin Charts". Billboard. Archived from the original on July 17, 2018.
- Schone, Mark (April 20, 1995). "A Postmortem Star In death, Selena is a crossover success". Newsday. Archived from the original on January 31, 2013.
- Shaw, Lisa (2005). Pop Culture Latin America!: Media, Arts, and Lifestyle. ABC-CLIO. ISBN 1-85109-504-7.
- Verhovek, Sam Howe (April 1, 1995). "Grammy-Winning Singer Selena Killed in Shooting at Texas Motel". The New York Times. p. 1. Archived from the original on July 20, 2016.
- Patoski, Joe Nick (1996). Selena: Como La Flor. Boston: Little Brown and Company. ISBN 0-316-69378-2.
- Untiedt, Kenneth L. (2013). Cowboys, Cops, Killers, and Ghosts: Legends and Lore in Texas. University of North Texas Press. ISBN 978-1-57441-532-2.
- Abraham Quintanilla Jr., A.B. Quintanilla, Suzette Quintanilla, Jennifer Lopez, Edward James Olmos (2007). The Making of Selena: 10 Years Later (DVD). Corpus Christi, Texas: Warner Bros. Event occurs at 30.
- Molina, Jessica (September 26, 2016). "Selena Quintanilla's sister showed off the new Selena 'Ones' vinyl and it's dope as hell". Vivala. Archived from the original on July 14, 2018.
- Caulfield, Keith (July 10, 2018). "Ozuna & J Balvin Loom Large on Nielsen Music's Mid-Year 2018 Latin Charts". Billboard.
