= Amor Prohibido (song) =

1994 single by Selena

Single by Selena

from the album Amor Prohibido
- B-side: "Bidi Bidi Bom Bom"
- Released: April 13, 1994
- Recorded: 1994
- Studio: Manny Studios (San Antonio, TX)
- Genre: Dance-pop; tejano cumbia; tecnocumbia
- Length: 2:50
- Label: EMI Latin
- Songwriters: Selena Quintanilla-Pérez; A.B. Quintanilla III; Pete Astudillo
- Producers: A.B. Quintanilla III; Jorge Alberto Pino; Bebu Silvetti; Gregg Vickers

Selena singles chronology
| "Donde Quiera Que Estés" (1994) | "Amor Prohibido" (1994) | "Bidi Bidi Bom Bom" (1994) |

Music video
- "Amor Prohibido" on YouTube

"Amor Prohibido" (English: "Forbidden Love") is a song by American Tejano singer Selena. It was released on April 13, 1994, by EMI Latin as the lead single from her fourth studio album of the same name. The track was written by Selena, her brother and music producer A.B. Quintanilla III, and her band's backup vocalist Pete Astudillo. A popular interpretation compares it to Romeo and Juliet.

The Tejano cumbia dance-pop song was acclaimed by music critics, who cited it as one of the singer's most popular singles. It topped the United States Billboard Hot Latin Songs chart for nine consecutive weeks, becoming her first number-one as a solo artist, and became the most successful US Latin single of 1994. It has since been certified 7× platinum by the Recording Industry Association of America (RIAA), denoting sales of 420,000 copies. A duet version with Samo was posthumously released in 2012, reaching number eight on the US Latin Pop Songs chart.

"Amor Prohibido" received the Tejano Music Award for Single of the Year, and was Regional Mexican Song of the Year at the Lo Nuestro and Billboard Latin Music Awards. "Amor Prohibido" was the first Spanish-language song to receive a Broadcast Music Award in the pop field in 1996. Many musicians have covered "Amor Prohibido", including Mexican pop singer Thalía, glam rock band Moderatto, Finnish singer Meiju Suvas, and American entertainers Jennifer Lopez and Keke Palmer.

== Background and production ==
Selena wanted to write and record a song based on the story of her grandparents, who fell in love despite their different social classes. The singer was inspired by love letters written by her grandmother who wrote about her experiences as a maid to a wealthy family and her infatuation with their son. Her grandmother was forbidden to formulate a relationship with him because of her social class and described it as a "forbidden love". The singer suggested the idea to her brother and music producer A.B. Quintanilla, who began co-writing the track with her and Selena y Los Dinos backup vocalist Pete Astudillo. "Amor Prohibido" was recorded at a studio in San Antonio, Texas. Selena's husband, Chris Pérez wrote in his 2012 memoir that during its recording session "there was a noticeable difference between her voice on ["Amor Prohibido"] and [the songs on] Entre a Mi Mundo (1992), especially. I can't say that it was an improvement, exactly, because I always thought that Selena's voice sounded incredible. It's just that her voice was richer and more mature than before, and her singing was more emotional and powerful as a result."

While recording the song, Selena ad-libbed "oh baby" after the track's refrain; her brother believed that the recording would "not have been the same if she had not added [that part]." A.B. said in a 2002 interview that he wanted "Bidi Bidi Bom Bom" to be the leadoff single, but Selena and EMI Latin insisted on "Amor Prohibido". The single was released on April 13, 1994, in the United States and Mexico.

== Composition ==
=== Instrumentation ===
"Amor Prohibido" is a Spanish-language Tejano cumbia and tecnocumbia dance-pop song. According to Mario Tarradell of The Dallas Morning News, it is a "synthesizer-heavy cumbia piece that's so catchy it's sinful". Tarradell called the recording "Tejano-like" and a "pop-styled opus". A Daily Democrat article said that "Amor Prohibido" had a mixture of sounds which included a modernized version of cumbia music with guitars, accordions, bass guitar, flutes, drums, and other percussion. Billboard singles editor Paul Verna called the song a "spunky cumbia", and John Lannert, also from Billboard, called it "peppy". Written in common time in the key of E minor, its tempo moves at a moderate 90 beats per minute and it features a descending keyboard hook. In a San Antonio Current interview, A.B. said that he added a cencerro which, he believed, attracted Cubans and Puerto Ricans to Selena's music. According to Quintanilla, his salsa-style cencerro was not "coincidental"; he believed that by incorporating it into "Amor Prohibido" and the singer's repertoire she "went from selling 25,000-50,000 to more than 500,000 [copies of her albums]".

=== Lyrics ===
"Amor Prohibido" (1994)
15-second sample of "Amor Prohibido" in which the lyrics of forbidden love between two people of different social classes can be heard; critics found its lyrics to be ambiguous by the LGBT community who altered it with prohibited love between same-sex couples.

Musicologist Howard Blumenthal interpreted "Amor Prohibido" as a "love forbidden" story by an unprivileged girl who is separated by social class from her love interest, and learns that true love is what really matters. Marco Torres of the Houston Press saw similarities between the song's lyrics and Selena and Pérez's relationship; her father and manager, Abraham Quintanilla, Jr., discouraged their romance before he accepted it. Its lyrics allude to female teenagers' "trouble[d]" partners and parents who forbid their relationship.

"Amor Prohibido" has become an anthem in the LGBT community. Deborah Paredez wrote in her 2009 book Selenidad that the song has "a legibly queer text" which resonates with that group. This was echoed by Emma Perez in her book, The Decolonial Imaginary: Writing Chicanas into History (1999), who found that the LGBT community had adopted the song and found it most popular with drag queens at nightclubs. Perez further explained that the lyrical content of forbidden love between two people of different social classes was altered with prohibited love between same-sex couples. (Note: Perez' assumptions originated in an October 1999 Washington Post article by Deborah Paredez and those by other authors who wrote about Mexican Americans and Selena's sexuality in terms of her clothing, dance style, and songs.) Alejandra Molina of the Orange County Register reported on a tribute to Selena by LGBT fans in Santa Ana, California, who found her songs "ambiguous"; "Amor Prohibido" was interpreted "as a love that is forbidden due to a person's sexuality, race or class."

Other music critics have compared the song to Romeo and Juliet, with society opposing a relationship based on socioeconomic status, or called it a look into society's view of romantic relationships. Ellie D. Hernández wrote in her book about Chicano culture that "Amor Prohibido" addresses "social and cultural desire that transcends the boundaries of romantic love". According to Hernández, the song's central theme is class- and race-based social division "that divides [Selena] from her beloved" and "suggests [a] hegemonic crisis informing Selena's lamentations." Hernández wrote that the lyrics spoke about modern societal views on romantic relationships, and one must "live in accordance" with those views or face "emotional banishment from [their] family and culture ... Risking everything for this love is not at all an innocent choice but a decision abundant with agency and consciousness that begins as a consequence of the forbidden."

== Critical reception ==
=== Reviews ===
"Amor Prohibido" received widespread critical acclaim, although Elizabeth Rodriguez Kessler and Anne Perrin called the song "soap-operaish" in Chican@s in the Conversations (2007). According to the South African magazine Drum, it was a "gently rocking song". Billboard Latin-music editorial division head Leila Cobo called the song "catchy". Marco Torres of the Houston Press wrote that "Amor Prohibido" was Selena's "most personal song", and Greg Kot of the Chicago Tribune said it had "a bit more contemporary snap to it." Mary Talbot of the New York Daily News called "Amor Prohibido" and "Como la Flor" (1992) "two straight-up Tejano hits" and a "requiem to Selena's career". Writing for the San Antonio Express-News, Michael Clark complimented A.B. Quintanilla's use of "world-music flourishes" on the song. Billboard's John Lannert called "Amor Prohibido" a "great smash" during its tenure atop the Hot Latin Songs chart, and BuzzFeed contributor Brian Galindo called it an "awesome ode to star-crossed lovers everywhere." Ashley Velez of Neon Tommy called the recording "a true testament to the forbidden love" and "proves that love conquers all." Emmanuel Hapsis posted on the KQED-FM website that anyone visiting a karaoke bar would probably hear someone sing "Amor Prohibido" or Selena's posthumously released single, "Dreaming of You" (1995).

The Daily Vault called "Amor Prohibido" a "seamless track". Ed Morales wrote that the song is a "classic mass market hit that inhabits the memory, easily floating in the summer air of radios on the streets." Don McLeese of the Austin American Statesman called it "compelling". According to Billboard Latin music editor Ramiro Burr, the song "marked Selena's ascendancy". Burr wrote for the San Antonio Express-News, "[Selena] balanced torchy ballads full of hurt and pain such as 'Amor Prohibido' with fun dance cumbias with a sense of humor"; "Songs such as 'Baila Esta Cumbia', 'La Carcacha', 'Como la Flor' and 'Amor Prohibido' had that instant appeal, that memorable melodic hook". Burr further wrote that "Amor Prohibido" and Selena's 1994 single "No Me Queda Más" were "heartbreaking ballads". Texas Monthly editor Joe Nick Patoski called "Amor Prohibido" the "perfect pop cumbia". "Con Tanto Amor Medley", a 2002 single from Ones, which is a mashup of "Amor Prohibido", "Si Una Vez" and "Como la Flor", was released to favorable reviews.

=== Recognition ===
According to sales figures analyzed by Guadalupe San Miguel in 2002, "Amor Prohibido" is Selena's best-selling cumbia single. It was the singer's "biggest hit of her career", topping the Hot Latin Songs chart for a cumulative twelve weeks. Music critics have called "Amor Prohibido" Selena's "best known" love song, one of her signature songs and her most successful single. (Note: Musicologist Howard Blumenthal called "Amor Prohibido" "one of Selena's best-love songs". Publisher John Murray called it Selena's "best-known" songs, "contain[ing] much of what is now known as the unique "Selena Sound". Billboard Latin music contributor Leila Cobo called "Amor Prohibido" one of Selena's signature tunes during her review of "Con Tanto Amor Medley" from the 2002 compilation album Ones, which features the song as a mashup with "Como la Flor" and "Si Una Vez". Kelly Brooks of the Ruidoso News wrote about A.B.'s band: "As a member of Los Dinos, Quintanilla would play bass guitar, produce and write songs for Selena, which became successful singles such as "Como la Flor," "Amor Prohibido" and "No Me Queda Más.") It is believed by Mario Tarradell of The Dallas Morning News that singles released from Amor Prohibido had alleviated Selena into Latin radio success–who previously did not take the singer seriously. The album and its titular single marked Tejano music's first commercial success in Puerto Rico. According to La Prensa, Selena put an "imprint on popular music" with "Amor Prohibido", "La Carcacha" (1990), "Como la Flor" (1992), and "La Llamada" (1993).

María Herrera-Sobek wrote in her book, Chicano Folklore: A Handbook, that "Como la Flor" and "Amor Prohibido" achieved national and international success. Billboard's Ramiro Burr called "Amor Prohibido" one of Selena's "fan favorites". "Amor Prohibido" continues to receive extensive airplay in South Texas and at Tejano-music nightclubs. Sally Jacobs of the Sun Sentinel asserted that "Amor Prohibido" remains popular in Spanish-speaking countries.

=== Accolades ===
"Amor Prohibido" has received awards and nominations, including the Broadcast Pop Music Awards in 1995 and 1996. "Amor Prohibido" became the first Spanish-language recording to win a Broadcast Music Award in the pop category based on airplay. It was recognized as being among the most performed recording of the year for two consecutive times by Broadcast Music. "Amor Prohibido" was Regional Mexican Song of the Year at the 1994 Billboard Latin Music Awards, and won in the same category at the 1995 Lo Nuestro Awards.

At the 1995 Tejano Music Awards, "Amor Prohibido" won Single of the Year and Record of the Year. In decade balloting at the 2010 Tejano Music Awards it was nominated for Best 1990s Song, losing to her 1994 single "Bidi Bidi Bom Bom". "Amor Prohibido" has appeared on several critics' "best Selena songs" lists, including OC Weekly (number one), Latino Post (number five), and BuzzFeed, Latina, and Neon Tommy (all number two). Rolling Stone listed the song at number 405 on their list of the 500 Greatest Songs of All Time.

== Chart performance ==
The song debuted on the Hot Latin Songs chart at number 13 for the week of April 23, 1994, and climbed to number five in its second week. "Amor Prohibido" rose to number four for two consecutive weeks beginning on May 7. When it rose to number three for the week of May 21, John Lannert predicted that the song would top the chart in two weeks. Vilma Maldonado of The Monitor called the single's climb on the chart "spectacular", calling Selena one of Latin music's "hottest international entertainers of the Tejano market." "Amor Prohibido" rose to number one the week of June 11, displacing La Mafia's "Vida" (which had dethroned Selena's collaboration with the Barrio Boyzz, "Donde Quiera Que Estés", on May 7). During "Amor Prohibido"'s fourth week atop the chart, Lannert wrote that there were "no challengers in sight" and predicted that it would remain at number one for an additional two weeks. During the song's fifth week atop the chart, Lannert noticed that Cuban singer Jon Secada's "Si Te Vas" was climbing and predicted that it would replace "Amor Prohibido" at number one in three weeks. During the song's seventh week atop the chart, when "Si Te Vas" rose to number two and Ricardo Montaner's "Quisiera" to number three, Lannert predicted that either song would displace "Amor Prohibido" from number one during the next few weeks. The following week, he provided data indicating that the recording "no longer appears to be under threat" despite losing 65 points in the Nielsen ratings; it was 350 points ahead of Secada's number-two "Si Te Vas". After nine weeks atop the Hot Latin Songs chart, "Amor Prohibido" was displaced by "Si Te Vas" the week of August 13. "Amor Prohibido" ended the year as the most successful US Latin single of 1994.

Selena was shot and killed by Yolanda Saldívar, her friend and former manager of the singer's Selena Etc. boutiques, on March 31, 1995. Four of her singles—"No Me Queda Más", "Bidi Bidi Bom Bom", "Como la Flor" and "Amor Prohibido"—reentered the Billboard Hot Latin Songs and Regional Mexican Airplay charts on April 15. The magazine posthumously named Selena its Top Artist of the 1990s because of her fourteen top-ten singles on the Hot Latin Songs chart, including seven number-ones. Billboard began monitoring digital downloads of Latin songs during the week ending January 23, 2010. "Amor Prohibido" made its debut at number 18 on the Latin Digital Song Sales following the twentieth anniversary of Selena's death. On the Latin Pop Digital Song Sales chart, the song peaked at number seven.

== Cover versions ==
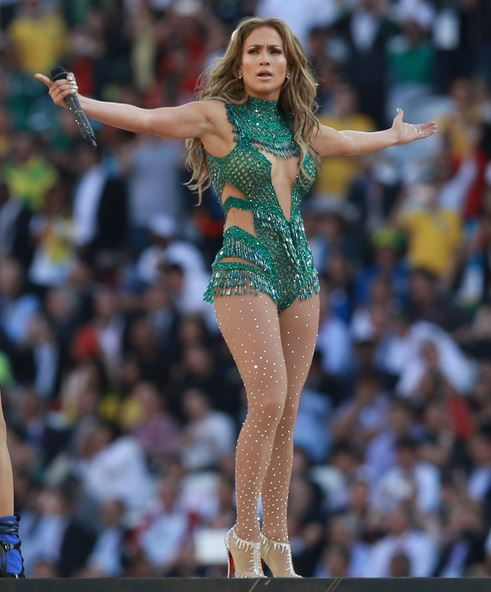
Entertainer Jennifer Lopez performed and recorded "Amor Prohibido", and Lopez performed the song during the 2015 Billboard Latin Music Awards with members of Selena y Los Dinos.

Salsa singer Yolanda Duke recorded "Amor Prohibido" for the tribute album, Familia RMM Recordando a Selena (1996). Colombian singer Shakira sang part of "Amor Prohibido" during a 2005 interview on Univision's Otro Rollo. Finnish recording artist Meiju Suvas recorded "Kielletty Rakkaus", a Finnish language version. Mexican pop singer Thalía performed and recorded the song during the live televised tribute concert, Selena ¡VIVE!, in April 2005; it was included on her ninth studio album, El Sexto Sentido (2005). Thalía performed a "bouncy" version of "Amor Prohibido" during her Houston concert on 30 March 2013, and Mexican singer Yuridia performed the song in 2014 during her Tour Essential.

American trio Brisa recorded "Amor Ilegal", which was influenced by "Amor Prohibido" and became a popular radio song in Ecuador. Mexican pop rock band Moderatto recorded it for their album, Malditos Pecadores (2014). Mexican singer Samo recorded a duet version of "Amor Prohibido" for the 2012 posthumous remix album, Enamorada de Ti. Samo told the Ecuadoran newspaper El Telégrafo that he had always dreamed of recording a duet with Selena, and "Amor Prohibido" was one of his favorite songs; he felt the "presence of Selena" as soon as he put on headphones and began recording. According to Joey Guerra of the San Antonio Express-News, the duet version "proved a solid preview for the album" and its "wistful lyrics work nicely as a duet with Samo". Guerra described it as a "gentle pop-rock arrangement", possibly as it was originally intended. Nilan Lovelace of Reporter Magazine called the duet version an "album favorite" and the type of music Selena would record today.

Other artists who covered "Amor Prohibido" include Latin singer Shoshana and American entertainer Keke Palmer. On 1 May 2015 Jennifer Lopez performed "A Selena Tribute" at the 2015 Latin Billboard Music Awards, which included "Amor Prohibido". Lopez was praised by music critics, who appreciated the singer's Selena-esque costumes. The recording debuted and peaked at number 33 on the Hot Latin Songs chart.

In 2025, Korean Pop group Le Sserafim covered the song.

== Charts ==
=== Weekly charts ===
| Chart (1994) | Position |
|---|---|
| Mexican Grupera Chart (El Siglo de Torreón) | 1 |
| US Hot Latin Songs (Billboard) | 1 |
| US Regional Mexican Airplay (Billboard) | 5 |
| US Latin Songs (Radio & Records) | 1 |
| US Regional Mexican Songs (Radio & Records) | 1 |
| US Tejano Singles (Radio & Records) | 1 |
| Chart (2012–13) | Position |
| US Latin Pop Airplay (Billboard) duet version | 8 |
| US Hot Latin Songs (Billboard) duet version | 25 |
| Mexico Espanol Airplay | 33 |

=== Year-end charts ===
| Chart (1994) | Position |
|---|---|
| US Hot Latin Songs (Billboard) | 1 |

=== All-time charts ===
| Chart (2016) | Position |
|---|---|
| US Hot Latin Songs (Billboard) | 46 |

== Certifications ==
| Region | Certification | Certified units/sales |
|---|---|---|
| United States (RIAA) | 7× Platinum (Latin) | 420,000^{‡} |
^{‡} Sales+streaming figures based on certification alone.

== See also ==
- Latin music in the United States
- List of number-one Billboard Hot Latin Tracks of 1994
- Billboard Top Latin Songs Year-End Chart
