= A Boy Like That =

Song from Leonard Bernstein's West Side Story

"A Boy Like That/I Have A Love" is a song from the 1957 Broadway musical West Side Story, with music by Leonard Bernstein and lyrics by Stephen Sondheim. In the musical, the song is sung by the characters Anita and Maria. Part of Maria's section is drawn from the "Redemption through Love" leitmotif in Richard Wagner's Ring cycle, which appears in the music dramas Die Walküre and Götterdämmerung.

For the original Broadway cast recording, the song was performed by Chita Rivera (Anita) and Carol Lawrence (Maria). In the 1961 film version the roles were played by Rita Moreno and Natalie Wood, but the songs were dubbed by Betty Wand and Marni Nixon (as both Anita and Maria). However, the repeat of the two stanzas, sung by Anita, along with Maria's counterpoint of her defense, was omitted because of the complexity of the song, as well as to avoid the repetition, which would have slowed down the pace of the film. In the 2021 film, the roles were played by Ariana DeBose and Rachel Zegler.

In 2010, Lin-Manuel Miranda and Raúl Esparza performed the song at Broadway Backwards, an annual Broadway Cares/Equity Fights AIDS showcase of show tunes sung by different genders. Miranda played Anita, while Esparza played Maria.

== Selena version ==
"A Boy Like That"

Single by Selena

from the album Selena
- Released: April 2, 1996
- Recorded: February 28–March 2, 1995
- Genre: Dance-pop; Latin pop
- Label: EMI
- Composer: Leonard Bernstein
- Lyricists: Stephen Sondheim; Selena Quintanilla-Pérez (Spanish lyrics)
- Producer: David Pack

Selena singles chronology
"God's Child" (1995)	"A Boy Like That" (1996)	"Last Dance/The Hustle/On The Radio" (1997)

In 1995 Selena recorded "A Boy Like That" for the various-artists compilation album The Songs of West Side Story, which was a benefit for AIDS Project Los Angeles. Her version of the song was released posthumously as a single in 1996 by RCA Victor, with the maxi-single including four remixes by Tony Moran. The song was also included on the soundtrack album Selena. David Pack produced the track and Sheila E. performed percussion. Additional vocals were provided by Michelle Weeks, Godwin, and Nikki Richards.

=== Track listing ===
US remixes

1. "A Boy Like That" (radio edit 1) - 4:06
2. "A Boy Like That" (radio edit 2) - 4:06
3. "A Boy Like That" (original edit) - 3:28
4. "A Boy Like That" (extended remix) - 8:14
5. "A Boy Like That" (guitar mix) - 4:54
6. "A Boy Like That" (dub mix) - 8:40
7. "A Boy Like That" (tribal mix) - 7:13
8. "A Boy Like That" (original full version) - 5:51
