= Selena (soundtrack) =

Selena: The Original Motion Picture Soundtrack

Soundtrack album by Selena
- Released: March 11, 1997 (US)
- Recorded: 1989–1995
- Genres: Tejano; Latin pop
- Length: 58:02
- Label: EMI
- Producers: A.B. Quintanilla III; Abraham Quintanilla, Jr.; Brian "Red" Moore; Guy Roche; David Pack; Keith Thomas

Selena chronology
Siempre Selena (1996)	Selena: The Original Motion Picture Soundtrack (1997)	Anthology (1998)

Singles from Selena: The Original Motion Picture Soundtrack
- 1. "Where Did the Feeling Go?" Released: March 15, 1997; 2. "Is It the Beat?" Released: February 16, 1997; 3. "Disco Medley Part 2 (Last Dance/The Hustle/On the Radio)" Released: 1997; 4. "Viviras Selena"/"One More Time" Released: 1997

Professional ratings
Review scores
Source	Rating
AllMusic	4/5 stars

Selena: The Original Motion Picture Soundtrack is the soundtrack album to the 1997 film Selena, starring Jennifer Lopez. It features unreleased songs by Selena, including "Where Did the Feeling Go?", "Only Love", "Is It the Beat?" and "Disco Medley". Although this is the official soundtrack of the film, it does not feature most of the songs heard throughout the film from artists like Caifanes, Depeche Mode, Guns N' Roses, John Waite and Yuri.

Where Did the Feeling Go? is composed by Norman Saleet and later recorded by Selena in 1989 and in 1991. She performed the song at the Tejano Music Awards and on her Ven Conmigo Tour. Selena's version of the song was later remixed with a new live string arrangement by Selena y Los Dinos keyboardist Ricky Vela and posthumously released on the soundtrack album for the 1997 film Selena and later included as a bonus track on the "20 Years of Music" version of Selena's 1992 album Entre a Mi Mundo, which was released by EMI Records in 2002.

Puerto Rican singer Millie Corretjer recorded a cover of "Where Did the Feeling Go?" in Spanish with the title "Donde te has ido amor". It appears on her 1995 album Sola.

== Track listing ==
No.	Title	Writer(s)	Length
1.	"Disco Medley, Part 1" ("I Will Survive"/Funkytown")	Frederick Perren; Dino Fekaris; Steve Greenberg	3:43
2.	"Where Did the Feeling Go?"	Norman Saleet	3:45
3.	"Disco Medley, Part 2" ("Last Dance"/"The Hustle"/"On the Radio")	Paul Jabara; Van McCoy; Donna Summer; Giorgio Moroder	4:14
4.	"Is It the Beat?"	A.B. Quintanilla III; Pamela Phillips Oland	4:10
5.	"Only Love"	Robbie Buchanan; Mark Spiro	4:13
6.	"Oldies Medley" ("Blue Moon"/"We Belong Together") (by Vidal Brothers)	Richard Rodgers; Lorenz Hart; Johnny Mitchell; Robert Carr; Sam Weiss	4:51
7.	"Dreaming of You"	Franne Golde; Tom Snow	5:15
8.	"A Boy Like That"	Leonard Bernstein; Stephen Sondheim	5:54
9.	"I Could Fall in Love"	Keith Thomas	4:41
10.	"Cumbia Medley" ("Como la Flor"/"La Carcacha"/"Bidi Bidi Bom Bom"/"Baila Esta Cumbia")	Quintanilla III; Pete Astudillo; Ricky Vela; Selena Quintanilla-Pérez	8:39
11.	"Viviras Selena" (by Pete Astudillo, Graciela Beltrán, Barrio Boyzz, Emilio Navaira, Jennifer Peña & Bobby Pulido)	Rubén Garza	5:04
12.	"One More Time" (by Lil Ray)	Edward James Olmos; Tony Joe White	3:45

== Singles ==
1. "Where Did the Feeling Go?"
2. "Is It the Beat?"
3. "Disco Medley, Part 2" ("Last Dance"/"The Hustle"/"On the Radio")
4. "Viviras Selena"/"One More Time"

== Charts ==
=== Weekly charts ===
Chart (1997)	Peak position
U.S. Billboard 200	7

== Certifications and sales ==
Region	Certification	Certified units/sales
Hong Kong (IFPI Hong Kong)	Gold	10,000^{*}
United States (RIAA)	Platinum	1,560,000
^{*} Sales figures based on certification alone.
