= List of songs written by Ricky Vela =

Ricky Vela is an American songwriter who has written songs since 1986. Vela's credits includes written material for Selena y Los Dinos, Leones Del Norte, Mazz, Pete Astudillo, Thalía, Cristian Castro, David Lee Garza, and A. B. Quintanilla's band Kumbia Kings. Vela came to prominence as a songwriter after he was hired as the keyboardist for Selena y Los Dinos in 1986. His first songwriting credit was on "Dame un Beso", a collaborative effort with A. B. Quintanilla, for Selena's Alpha (1986) album. "Dame un Beso" was nominated at the 1987 Tejano Music Awards for Single of the Year and Song of the Year, and became Selena's first critically acclaimed single. "Dame tu Amor" was the first recording Vela co-wrote with the manager of Selena y Los Dinos, Abraham Quintanilla. The tracks "Dame un Beso" and "Dame tu Amor" received a resurgence in popularity in the 21st century. "Dame tu Amor" peaked at number 31 on the Hot Ringtones chart in 2006 following the release of Classic Series Vol. I. Following the release of Selena: The Series (2020–21), "Dame un Beso" peaked at number 25 on the US Billboard Latin Digital Song Sales chart. Vela wrote "Quiero Estar Contigo" for Selena in 1988, it was later covered by Tejano music band Leones del Norte in 1992.

In 1993, Vela wrote "Tu Robaste Mi Corazon", a duet with Selena featuring Emilio Navaira for the singer's Selena Live! album. Vela also wrote "No Debes Jugar" for Selena Live!; the song peaked at number three on the Hot Latin Songs chart and was certified platinum by the Recording Industry Association of America (RIAA) which denotes 60,000 units consisting of sales and on-demand streaming. For Selena's Amor Prohibido (1994), Vela wrote or cowrote "El Chico del Apartamento 512", "Tus Desprecios", "Ya No", "Fotos y Recuerdos", and "No Me Queda Más". "No Me Queda Más" peaked at number one on the Hot Latin Songs chart, it became the most successful US Latin single of 1995. Singer-songwriter Chrissie Hynde initially prevented the band from releasing "Fotos y Recuerdos" after she found out it sampled her "Back on the Chain Gang" (1983) single. She eventually allowed the band to include it on Amor Prohibido after Vela provided an English-language translation of the track for Hynde. "Fotos y Recuerdos" peaked at number one on the Hot Latin Songs chart following the shooting death of Selena on March 31, 1995. Vela remained an active presence in the music industry and provided songs he wrote to various artists, with his final songwriting credit "Contigo" which was written for Kumbia Kings in 2003. The track "Lo Dejo Solo" which was penned by Vela in 1986 was shelved and remained unreleased until 2006 on the posthumously released Classic Series, Vol. I.

== Songs ==
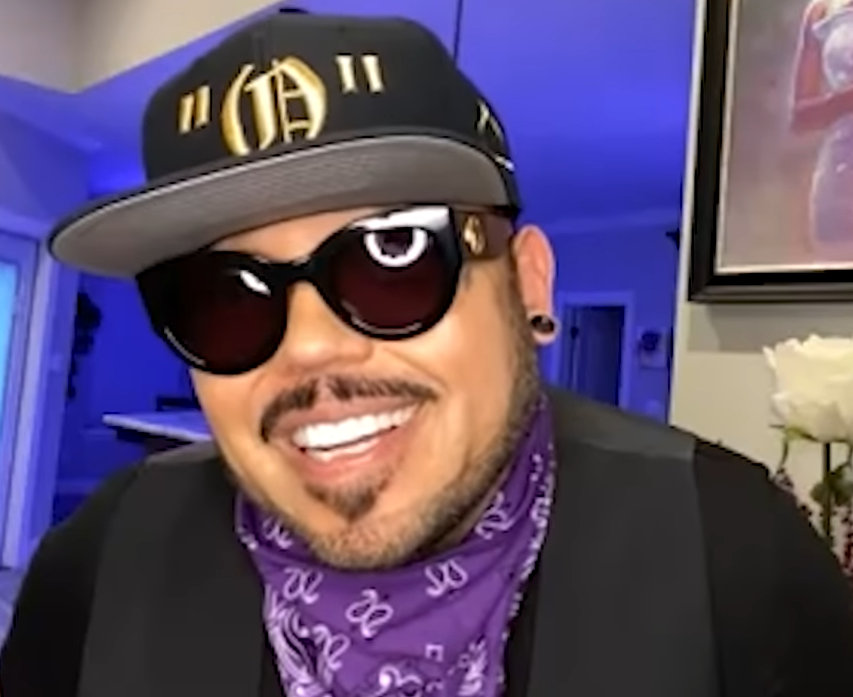
Ricky Vela often collaborated with A. B. Quintanilla (pictured), who was the music producer for Selena y Los Dinos.

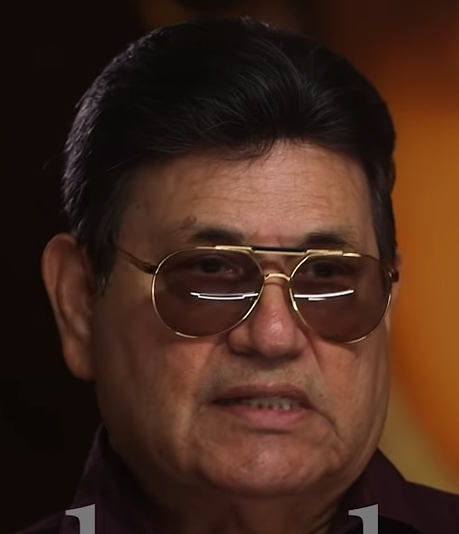
Vela co-wrote "Dame tu Amor" (1986) with band manager Abraham Quintanilla (pictured).

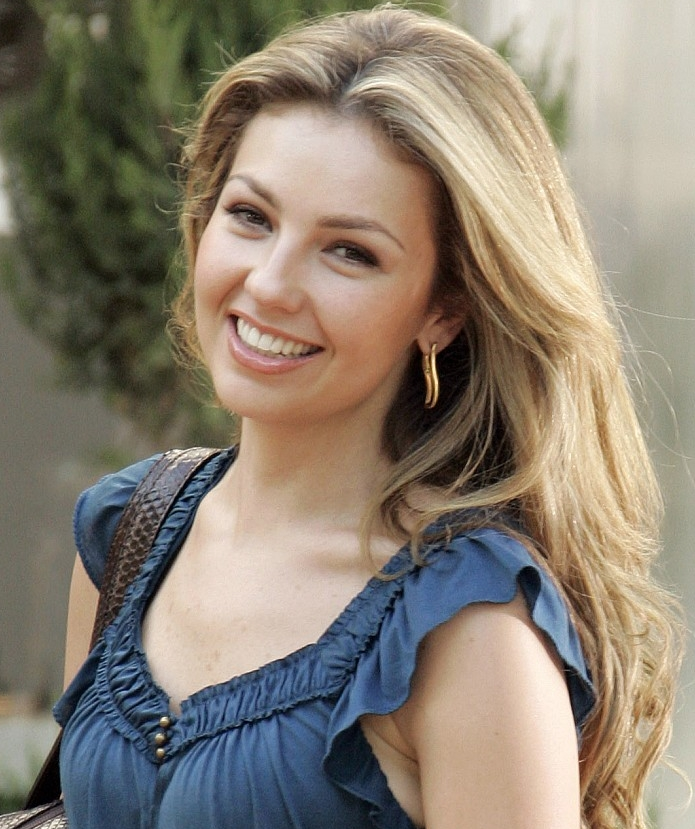
Vela wrote "Amándote" for Thalía in 1995.

Key
‡	Indicates song written solely by Ricky Vela

Name of song, featured performers, writer(s), original release, and year of release
Song	Artist(s)	Writer(s)	Album	Year	Ref.
"Amándote"	Thalía	A. B. Quintanilla, Ricky Vela	En Extasis	1995	
"Always Mine"	Selena	A. B. Quintanilla, Ricky Vela, Selena Quintanilla-Perez	Dulce Amor	1988	
"Contigo"	Kumbia Kings	A. B. Quintanilla, Jesse García, Humberto García, Ricky Vela	4	2003	
"Carino Mio"	Selena	Ricky Vela ‡	Preciosa	1988	
"Carino, Carino Mio"	Selena	Ricky Vela ‡	Dulce Amor	1988	
"Como Te Quiero" (Note: Retitled as "Como Te Quiero Yo a Ti" for Momentos Intimos (2004))	Selena	Ricky Vela ‡	Preciosa	1988	
"Como Quisiera"	Selena	A. B. Quintanilla, Ricky Vela	Preciosa	1988	
"Cuando Despierto"	Selena	Ricky Vela ‡	Muñequito De Trapo	1987	
"Dame un Beso"	Selena	A. B. Quintanilla, Ricky Vela	Alpha	1986	
"Dime Porque"	Kumbia Kings	A. B. Quintanilla, Ricky Vela	Shhh!	2001	
"Dime Quién"	Kumbia Kings	A. B. Quintanilla, Ricky Vela	Amor, Familia y Respeto	1999	
"Estúpido Romántico"	Mazz	Pete Astudillo, Ricky Vela	Sólo para Ti	1995	
"Esperandote"	Cristian Castro	A. B. Quintanilla, Ricky Vela	El Deseo de Oír Tu Voz	1996	
"El Tejano"	Selena	Manny Guerra, Ricky Vela	Alpha	1986	
"El Chico del Apartamento 512"	Selena	A. B. Quintanilla, Ricky Vela	Amor Prohibido	1994	
"El Circo"	Selena	Ricky Vela ‡	Muñequito De Trapo	1987	
"Fotos y Recuerdos"	Selena	Chrissie Hynde, Ricky Vela	Amor Prohibido	1994	
"Fuiste Mala"	Kumbia Kings	A. B. Quintanilla, Cruz Martínez, Ricky Vela	Amor, Familia y Respeto	1999	
"Las Cadenas"	Selena	A. B. Quintanilla, Ricky Vela	Entre a Mi Mundo	1992	
"Lo Dejo Solo"	Selena	Ricky Vela ‡	Classic Series, Vol. I	2006	
"Me Estoy Muriendo"	Kumbia Kings	A. B. Quintanilla, Luigi Giraldo, Ricky Vela	Shhh!	2001	
"No Debes Jugar"	Selena	A. B. Quintanilla, Ricky Vela	Selena Live!	1993	
"No Llores Mas Corazon"	Selena	A. B. Quintanilla, Ricky Vela	Dulce Amor	1988	
"No Me Queda Más"	Selena	Ricky Vela ‡	Amor Prohibido	1994	
"Pensando en Ti"	Selena	Roger Garcia, Ricky Vela	Alpha	1986	
"Quiero Estar Contigo"	Selena, Leones Del Norte	A. B. Quintanilla, Ricky Vela	Preciosa, Las Botas Rotas	1988, 1992	
"Quisiera Darte"	Selena	Ricky Vela ‡	Dulce Amor	1988	
"Sabes"	Selena	Ricky Vela ‡	Preciosa	1988	
"Si La Quieres"	Selena	Ricky Vela ‡	Ven Conmigo	1990	
"Soy Amiga"	Selena	Ricky Vela ‡	Alpha	1986	
"Tengo Ganas de Llorar"	Selena	A. B. Quintanilla, Ricky Vela	Selena	1989	
"Te Quiero, Te Amo"	David Lee Garza	Ricky Vela ‡	Tour 98	1998	
"Te Quiero a Ti"	Kumbia Kings	A. B. Quintanilla, Ricky Vela	Amor, Familia y Respeto	1999	
"Tus Desprecios"	Selena	A. B. Quintanilla, Ricky Vela	Amor Prohibido	1994	
"Tu No Sabes"	Selena	Ricky Vela ‡	And the Winner Is...	1987	
"Tu Robaste Mi Corazon"	Selena featuring Emilio Navaira	A. B. Quintanilla, Ricky Vela	Selena Live!	1993	
"Ven a Verme"	Selena	Roger Garcia, Ricky Vela	And the Winner Is...	1987	
"Vuelvo"	Mazz	Ricky Vela	Lo Haré Por Ti	1992	
"Ya No"	Selena	A. B. Quintanilla, Ricky Vela	Amor Prohibido	1994	
"Yo Estaré A Tu Lado"	Pete Astudillo	Pete Astudillo, Ricky Vela	Como Te Extraño	1995	
"Yo Te Sigo Queriendo"	Selena	A. B. Quintanilla, Ricky Vela	Entre a Mi Mundo	1992	

== Works cited ==
- Kumbia Kings (2003). 4 (Media notes). A.B. Quintanilla (producer). EMI Latin. 724358283020.
- "Hot Latin Songs > August 14, 1993". Billboard.com.
- "Hot Latin Songs > December 17, 1994" (PDF). Billboard. Vol. 106, no. 50. December 17, 1994.
- "Topping The Charts Year By Year". Billboard. Vol. 110, no. 48. November 28, 1998. p. LMQ3.
- "Hot Ringtones > September 23, 2006". Billboard. Archived from the original on October 7, 2012.
- "RIAA Certifications > No Debes Jugar". RIAA.com.
- Quintanilla, Selena (1994). Amor Prohibido (Media notes). A.B. Quintanilla (producer). EMI Latin. H4724382880349.
- Quintanilla, A.B. (1999). Amor, Familia y Respeto (Media notes). A.B. Quintanilla (producer). EMI Latin. 724349918924.
- Quintanilla, Selena (1987). And the Winner Is... (Media notes). A.B. Quintanilla (producer). G.P. Productions/Manny Records. 017106101944.
- Quintanilla, Selena (1986). Alpha (Media notes). A.B. Quintanilla (producer). G.P. Productions/Manny Records. GPLP-1002A TLP.
- Bustios, Pamela (December 16, 2020). "Selena Returns to Latin Pop Albums Chart With 'Selena: The Series Soundtrack'" (PDF). Billboard Pro.
- Astudillo, Pete (1995). Como Te Extraño (Media notes). A.B. Quintanilla (producer). EMI Latin. H2724383601127.
- Quintanilla, Selena (2006). Classic Series, Vol. I (Media notes). A.B. Quintanilla](producer). Q-Productions. 635750012128.
- Quintanilla, Selena (1988). Dulce Amor (Media notes). A.B. Quintanilla (producer). G.P. Productions/Manny Records. RPC 8803.
- Castro, Cristian (1996). El Deseo de Oír Tu Voz (Media notes). A.B. Quintanilla (producer). Fonovisa. FPCD-0510.
- Quintanilla, Selena (1992). Entre a Mi Mundo (Media notes). A.B. Quintanilla (producer). EMI Latin. 077774263542.
- Thalía (1995). En Extasis (Media notes). Oscar Lopez (producer). EMI Latin. 0724383685028.
- Leones del Norte (1992). Las Botas Rotas (Media notes). Carlos Jaime Guerra (producer). RIMO Records. 7509980105253.
- Lapham, Bob (July 22, 1988). "Selena Headlines Show". Abilene Reporter-News – via Newspapers.com.
- Grupo Mazz (1992). Lo Haré Por Ti (Media notes). Jimmy González (producer). EMI Latin. H2077774259323.
- Quintanilla, Selena (2004). Momentos Intimos (Media notes). A.B. Quintanilla (producer). EMI Latin. 724359884523.
- Quintanilla, Selena (1987). Muñequito De Trapo (Media notes). A.B. Quintanilla (producer). G.P. Productions/Manny Records. 017106709249.
- Patoski, Joe Nick (1996). Selena: Como La Flor. Boston: Little Brown and Company. ISBN 0-316-69378-2.
- Perez, Chris (2012). To Selena, with Love. Penguin Books. ISBN 978-1-101-58026-4.
- Quintanilla, Selena (1988). Preciosa (Media notes). A.B. Quintanilla (producer). G.P. Productions/Manny Records. RPLP-8801.
- Quintanilla, Selena (1989). Selena (Media notes). A.B. Quintanilla (producer). EMI Latin. 0077774214421.
- Quintanilla, Selena (1993). Selena Live! (Media notes). A.B. Quintanilla (producer). EMI Latin. H2077774277020.
- Kumbia Kings (2001). Shhh! (Media notes). A.B. Quintanilla (producer). EMI Latin. H4724352974542.
- Mazz (1995). Solo Para Ti (Media notes). Jimmy Gonzalez (producer). EMI Latin. 5099994760125.
- David Lee Garza (1998). Tour 98 (Media notes). Daivd Lee Garza (producer). EMI Latin. 724385797323.
- Quintanilla, Selena (1990). Ven Conmigo (Media notes). A.B. Quintanilla (producer). EMI Latin. H1E-42359.
- Verhovek, Sam Howe (April 1, 1995). "Grammy-Winning Singer Selena Killed in Shooting at Texas Motel". The New York Times. p. 1. Archived from the original on July 20, 2016.
