= Hunter Reese Peña =

American actor

- Citizenship: United States
- Occupations: Actress; Singer; Writer
- Years active: 2012–present
- Known for: portraying "Ricky Vela" in the Netflix television series Selena: The Series

Hunter Reese Peña is an American actress, singer, and writer born to Mexican immigrant parents. Hunter is best known for portraying "Ricky Vela" in the Netflix television series Selena: The Series.

== Life ==
Hunter is a bilingual actor in Hollywood, speaking both English and Spanish. Hunter grew up in the Central Valley in the state of California. Hunter was taught the acting technique, the Meisner technique to her by Sanford Meisner alum Don Bloomfield at The DBA Studio. She identifies as a transgender woman.

== Career ==
In Selena: The Series, Hunter plays "Ricky Vela," a brilliant keyboard player who initially refuses to join the Quintanilla family band (Selena y Los Dinos), but then later accepts. Throughout the course of the series Hunter's character becomes one of A.B. Quintanilla’s greatest collaborative songwriting partners, penning some of Selena's greatest hits. Among the Selena hits penned by Ricky are fan-favorites like No Me Queda Mas, Fotos Y Recuerdos, El Chico del Apartamento 512.

Hunter showed her commitment to the role of Ricky by gaining 60 pounds for her portrayal. Making her casting in Selena: The Series even more meaningful, Hunter revealed to Esquire Magazine: Mexico that Selena was her childhood hero.

== Advocacy ==
Hunter is an outspoken Latino actress who advocates for the advancement of Latino portrayals in media. Hunter has spoken out about the lack of Latino representation in American media, even though the Latino population represents 18% of the country's population. Adding also, that the current representation of Latinos in media (as of 2020) can often be limited to harmful stereotypes. Hunter stated that, because of this, the creation of Selena: The Series (based on Selena's life) is even more important, because it showcases Latino actors in roles that are groundbreakingly normal.

Hunter is also known for her advocacy for trans people. Hunter uses her Instagram page to educate people and has a series in which she rates funny jokes that include trans people without punching down or including bigotry.

== Filmography ==
Film/Television
Year	Title	Role	Notes
2012	Shooting Sophie	Party Guy	Short
2013	Eventually	Ian	Short
2014	Sketch Juice	Hunter	TV series
2016	Tinder Chick	Samantha	Video Short
2017	Morning Ritual	Gernando	Short
2020	60 Milligrams	Tom	Short
2020	Separation	Scott	TV movie
2020	Got Game?	Banana Peel No. 4	Short
2020–2021	Selena: The Series	Ricky Vela	TV series
