= Preciosa (album) =

Studio album by Selena y Los Dinos
- Released: 1988
- Recorded: 1988
- Genre: Tejano
- Length: 30:17
- Label: RP Records
- Producers: A.B. Quintanilla, Manny Guerra

Selena y Los Dinos chronology
And the Winner Is... (1987)	Preciosa (1988)	Dulce Amor (1988)

Singles from Preciosa
- 1. "Terco Corazon" / ”Quiero" Released: 1988; 2. "Yo Fui Aquella/"Como Quisiera"

Preciosa (English: Precious) is the fifth independent studio album by Tejano music group Selena y Los Dinos. It was released in 1988 under Manny Guerra’s RP Records. Preciosa garnered favorable reception from music critics, with Tim Baker of Newsweek observing the group finally purging their oldie influences from their discography. At the 1989 Tejano music awards, Selena was the finalist for Female Vocalist of the Year. Terco Corazon was nominated for Single of the Year, and A.B was nominated for Songwriter of the Year.

== Background ==
In the aftermath of the 1981 recession in Texas, former musician Abraham Quintanilla, endeavored to propel his children's band Selena y Los Dinos as a means of achieving financial stability following their eviction from their home. The ensemble comprised Selena as the lead vocalist, A.B. Quintanilla as the bassist and producer, and Suzette Quintanilla on drums. The group's roster subsequently expanded to incorporate Ricky Vela on keyboards and Roger Garcia on guitar. The group's second album, Alpha (1986) provided the band with "Dame un Beso", their first commercially acclaimed single. This success was succeeded by their rendition of Jimmy Charles' composition "A Million to One" (1986), which garnered the distinction of being the most frequently played track on the KEDA radio station in San Antonio, Texas. "Dame un Beso" and "A Million to One" contributed to Selena securing the Tejano Music Award for Female Vocalist of the Year in 1987. The groups fourth album And the Winner Is... featured a cover of “La Bamba” which became the group's first appearance on a national music chart, reaching its peak at number 20 on the US Billboard Hot Latin Tracks chart in August 1987. During this time Selena was the most requested artist on ten out of fifteen Tejano radio stations and her albums began selling up to 20,000 copies. Preciosa features the most original compositions by the group up to this point, as well as renditions of traditional Mexican songs.

== Reception and media appearances ==
The album relies on a highly produced amalgamation of Tejano music and synthesized pop. Tim Baker of Newsweek would give a positive review, “Rather than seeming like the product of too many cooks, this shift from Rock to pop puts the focus of the album on Selena, giving her a chance to show off her very powerful vocals. It would be hard to say that Selena y Los Dinos still sounded like a band of equals rather than a vocalist with a backing group; the album was proof Selena was the real star of the show.” Selena biographer Joe Nick Patoski would comment that Preciosa and Dulce Amor would bring Selena's career into “Sharp focus”. Joey Guerra of Houston Chronicle would rank Preciosa as the tenth preeminent album released by Selena and called “Como Te Quiero”and “Sabes” “precursors to ‘No Me Queda Mas.’”

Selena y Los Dinos were invited to be the opening act at the 1989 Tejano music awards replacing La Sombra. Selena would perform a medley of songs from Preciosa and Dulce Amor. This performance was dramatized by Christian Serratos as Selena in the two-part limited drama, Selena: The Series (2020–21). During the 1989 Tejano music awards, Selena would win Female Entertainer of the Year and Female Vocalist of the Year. Terco Corazon was nominated for Single of the Year, and A.B was nominated for Songwriter of the Year.

In 1990, the tracks Terco Corazon, Yo Fui Aquella, Siempre, Quiero, Quiero Estar Contigo, and Cien Anos were re-recorded for the group's first greatest hits album 16 Super Exitos Originales. In 2007, Abraham released Classic series Vol. 4, remastered tracks of Preciosa under his Q-Zone Records label. In 2022, Como Te Quiero Yo a Ti, Carino Mio, and Sabes, were selected to be remixed for the album Moonchild Mixes with Como Te Quiero Yo a Ti serving as the lead single.

== Track listing ==
No.	Title	Writer(s)	Length
1.	"Terco Corazon"	A.B. Quintanilla III	2:59
2.	"Cien Años"	Ruben Fuentes, Alberto Cervantes	3:06
3.	"Siempre"	Juan Gabriel	3:38
4.	"Quiero"	Quintanilla III	3:13
5.	"Sabes"	Ricky Vela	2:22
6.	"Quiero Estar Contigo"	Quintanilla III	2:36
7.	"Como Te Quiero Yo A Ti"	Vela	3:40
8.	"Yo Fui Aquella"	Quintanilla III	3:00
9.	"Como Quisiera"	Quintanilla III, Vela	3:13
10.	"Cariño Mio"	Vela	3:21

== Personnel ==
- Selena – vocals
- A.B. Quintanilla – bass, producer
- Suzette Quintanilla – drums
- Jesse Ibarra – guitar
- Ricky Vela – keyboards
- Manny Guerra – producer
