= Dame Tu Amor =

Song by Selena Quintanilla-Pérez

Song by Selena y Los Dinos

from the album Alpha
- Recorded: 1986
- Studio: AMEN Studios (San Antonio, TX)
- Genre: Ranchera, cumbia
- Length: 3:43
- Label: GP Records
- Songwriters: Abraham Quintanilla, Jr., Ricky Vela, Richard Brooks
- Producer: Thomas Hernandez

"Dame Tu Amor" (English: "Give Me Your Love") is a song recorded by American recording artist Selena for her second LP record, Alpha (1986). Lyrically, the narrator addresses her infatuation to give her his love as she is longing for him to do so with a kiss that ensures admiration for her. The themes explored in the song suggest solicit love. "Dame Tu Amor" is a ranchera ballad with cumbia influences. It was composed by Richard Brooks, Ricky Vela, and Selena's father and manager, Abraham Quintanilla, Jr. Critics praised the song for its instrumentation and lyrical content and has since been in several compilation albums following Selena's death in 1995. "Dame Tu Amor" peaked at number 31 on the US Billboard Hot Ringtones chart in 2006.

== Background and composition ==
"Dame Tu Amor" was written in 1985 by Richard Brooks, keyboardist for Selena y Los Dinos—Ricky Vela—and Selena's father and manager, Abraham Quintanilla, Jr. Selena was 14 years old during recording sessions for the song, and it was later included on her second LP record, Alpha, in 1986. The recording was arranged by Brian "Red" Moore, a family friend, and Ray Paz. Rolando Hernandez performed the guitar parts, while Vela used his keyboards to record the piano parts of the song. While additional vocals were provided by former guitarist of the group, Roger Garcia.

== Critical reception and release ==
"Dame Tu Amor" was well received by music critics. Josh Kun of Salon noted that the remix version, found on the triple box-set Anthology, has "enough brass and string to make it sound like a Bacharach-penned ranchero." Mario Tarradell of The Dallas Morning News called the recording an "infectious cumbia [song]." The recording has been released in several compilation albums including, Anthology (1998), Y Sus Inicios, Vol. 1 (2003), Y Sus Inicios, Vol. 2 (2004) and Classic Series, Vol. 1 (2006).

== Chart performance ==
On the week ending September 23, 2006, "Dame Tu Amor" debuted and peaked at number 31 on the US Billboard Hot Ringtones chart.

| Chart (2006) | Peak position |
|---|---|
| U.S. Billboard Hot Ringtones | 31 |
