= And the Winner Is... (Selena y Los Dinos album) =

Studio album by Selena y Los Dinos
- Released: April 1987
- Recorded: 1986–87
- Genre: Tejano
- Length: 30:17
- Label: GP Productions
- Producers: A.B. Quintanilla, Manny Guerra

Selena y Los Dinos chronology
Muñequito de Trapo (1986)	And the Winner Is... (1987)	Preciosa (1988)

Singles from And the Winner Is...
- 1. "Acuerdate de Mi / Yo Te Dare" Released: 1986; 2. "Tu No Sabes / La Bamba" Released: 1987

And the Winner Is... is the fourth independent studio album by Tejano music group Selena y Los Dinos. It was released in April 1987 under Manny Guerra's GP Productions. The title alludes to the multitude of accolades Selena garnered since her entry into the music industry. And the Winner Is... was unveiled with the objective of expanding the Tejano audience that the band had recently enthralled. Among the album's singles, "La Bamba" represented Selena's initial appearance on a national music chart, reaching its peak at number 20 on the US Billboard Hot Latin Tracks chart in August 1987. Concurrently, Selena's rendition was released around the same time as Los Lobos', which supported the eponymous film. As Selena y Los Dinos was a relatively obscure group, their version began to wane on the chart as Los Lobos' version climbed. And the Winner Is... garnered favorable reception from music critics, with Tim Baker of Newsweek observing the group's gradual elimination of their characteristic doo-wop sound from prior recordings. While And the Winner Is... secured a nomination for Album of the Year at the 1988 Tejano Music Awards, Selena won Female Vocalist of the Year, her second consecutive win.

== Background ==
In the aftermath of the 1981 recession in Texas, former musician Abraham Quintanilla, endeavored to propel his children's band Selena y Los Dinos as a means of achieving financial stability following their eviction from their home. The ensemble comprised Selena as the lead vocalist, A.B. Quintanilla as the bassist and producer, and Suzette Quintanilla on drums. The group's roster subsequently expanded to incorporate Ricky Vela on keyboards and Roger Garcia on guitar. The group's second album, Alpha (1986) provided the band with "Dame un Beso", their first commercially acclaimed single. This success was succeeded by their rendition of Jimmy Charles' composition "A Million to One" (1986), which garnered the distinction of being the most frequently played track on the KEDA radio station in San Antonio, Texas. "Dame un Beso" and "A Million to One" contributed to Selena securing the Tejano Music Award for Female Vocalist of the Year in 1987. The 15-year-old's win supplanted the genre's leading lady, Laura Canales, eliciting astonishment among those present.

And the Winner Is... was released in April 1987, with the title alluding to the numerous accolades Selena accrued since her entry into the music industry. Selena's biographer, Joe Nick Patoski, opined that "[Selena] wasn't just a winner, but a winner who knew how to win with grace and humility." Scholar Deborah Vargas posited that the album's title, devoid of irony, signified that "from the time she received her first award until her death, Selena would become a dominant fixture at annual awards shows in Texas." Abraham selected the album's title as a means of asserting mainstream significance while concurrently reverting to his Tejano origins. The album cover portrays Selena "proudly holding" the Female Vocalist of the Year accolade from the 1987 Tejano Music Awards. The album encompassed a selection of original compositions, in addition to renditions of traditional Mexican songs. And the Winner Is... was released with the intention of augmenting the Tejano audience the band had recently captivated.

== Reception and media appearances ==
The album encompassed "La Bamba", a pop cover of Ritchie Valens 1957 song, which was released as a single in the summer of 1987. Tim Baker of Newsweek characterized the track as a "clubbified remix". Patoski regarded Selena's concluding query in the song, "am I bothering you?", as enigmatic. "La Bamba" emerged as the most memorable track off And the Winner Is..., and was released in the wake of the success of Miami Sound Machine. Valens and Trini Lopez, who recorded the song in 1963, each achieved sales of 1,000,000 copies for their respective renditions of "La Bamba". Abraham aspired for some of their enchantment to "rub off [on Selena]". Patoski observed that the group revitalized "La Bamba" with a "semi-salsified interpretation". Concurrently, Selena's songs received airplay on Texas radio stations at an average frequency of once every 30 minutes. "La Bamba" entered the US Billboard Hot Latin Tracks chart in August 1987, marking Selena y Los Dinos' inaugural appearance on a music chart; it eventually peaked at number 20. Selena's version was released around the same time as Los Lobos' rendition, which supported the film La Bamba (1987). Abraham recollected how A.B. was unable to rival Hollywood, and the group's version began to decline on the chart as Los Lobos ascended; "we were an unknown group, they knocked us away," Abraham later remarked. The album also featured the sentimental ballads "Cuando Nadie Te Quiera", a cover of Mexican singer-songwriter, Jose Alfredo Jimenez, and the Vela-penned "Tu No Sabes". A music video for "Tu No Sabes" was shot at the Martin Weiss Park in Oak Cliff, bolstering her fan base in the region. The video was captured by Gilberto Cortez using a camcorder, while the song played through a boombox. And the Winner Is... was nominated for Album of the Year, while Selena won Female Vocalist of the Year at the 1988 Tejano Music Awards. According to Baker, the group was gradually eradicating their usual doo-wop sound from their repertoire in And the Winner Is...

On April 26, 1987, Selena rendered a performance of "La Bamba" on the Johnny Canales Show in Matamoros, Mexico. Patoski characterized her attire as an evolution from her space suit at the Tejano Music Awards to a "silver, sparkling matadora outfit" which signaled a "tinge of sexuality". Nonetheless, Patoski noted that Selena's choreography remained minimalistic and rudimentary, with sporadic hip-swaying. This performance was dramatized by Christian Serratos as Selena in the Netflix two-part limited drama, Selena: The Series (2020–21). The episode "And the Winner Is..." derives its title from the album. Joey Guerra of the Houston Chronicle, ranked And the Winner Is... as the thirteenth preeminent album released by Selena. In 2007, Abraham released Classic Series Vol. 3, remastered tracks of And the Winner Is... under his Q-Zone Records label. On August 26, 2022, "Salta La Ranita" was released as a single off of Moonchild Mixes (2022). The cumbia track "Salta La Ranita", was contemporized and remixed for the album. The animated music video, described by Ariana Garcia of the Houston Chronicle, as "vibrant and colorful", portrays a frog wedding at which Selena is invited to perform. The music video elicited a mixed response from fans; while some believed the video could introduce a younger demographic to her music, others contended that Selena's family was exploiting the singer for monetary gain. Mariam M. Echevarría Báez of El Vocero has drawn a parallel between the comedic essence of "La Carcacha" (1992) and that of "Salta La Ranita". Guerra called "Salta La Ranita" an energetic and "silly" cumbia track.

== Track listing ==
Track listing of And the Winner Is...
No.	Title	Writer(s)	Length
1.	"Acuerdate de Mi"	A.B. Quintanilla, Ricky Vela	3:29
2.	"Tu No Sabes"	Vela, Roger Garcia	3:14
3.	"La Bamba"	Traditional	2:44
4.	"Tres Dias"	Andres Huesca	3:11
5.	"Yo Te Dare"	A.B.	3:29
6.	"Te Amo Solo a Ti"	E. J. Ledesma	3:12
7.	"Cuando Nadie Te Quiera"	Jose A. Jimenez	3:14
8.	"Corazon Abandonado"	Cornelio Reyna	2:33
9.	"Salta La Ranita"	Victor Hugo Garza	3:07
10.	"Ven a Verme"	Vela, Garcia	2:53
Total length:			30:17

== Personnel ==
- Selena – vocals
- A.B. Quintanilla – bass, producer
- Suzette Quintanilla – drums
- Roger Garcia – guitar
- Ricky Vela – keyboards
- Manny Guerra – producer
- Ramon Hernandez – art direction

== See also ==
- Selena albums discography
- Latin American music in the United States

== Works cited ==
- "Hot Latin Songs > August 8, 1987". Billboard. August 8, 1987.
- Baker, Tim (2018). "The Life and Legacy of Tejano's Queen". Newsweek (100).
- Fuentes, Tamara (December 7, 2020). "Did Selena Really Meet Laura Canales in the Bathroom at the 1986 Tejano Music Awards?". Yahoo.com.
- Crumpton, Taylor (March 2022). "214 Selena Honors Selena's Legacy in Oak Cliff". D Magazine.
- Garcia, Ariana (September 23, 2022). "New animated Selena music video sparks controversy among singer's fans". Houston Chronicle.
- Echevarría Báez, Mariam M. (August 26, 2022). "Nueva vida a la música de Selena". El Vocero (in Spanish).
- Guerra, Joey. "Ranking Selena's albums: 'Dulce Amor' to 'Dreaming of You'". Houston Chronicle.
- Guerra, Joey. "Backstage with Selena: A fan recounts his memories of the Tejano singer". Houston Chronicle.
- Guerra, Joey (March 27, 2020). "These 24 Selena songs don't get played enough". Houston Chronicle.
- Hewitt, Bill; Harmes, Joseph; Stewart, Bob (April 17, 1995). "Before Her Time". People Weekly. 43 (15): 138.
- Lapham, Bob (July 22, 1988). "Selena Headlines Show". Abilene Reporter-News – via Newspapers.com.
- Márquez, Herón. (2001). Latin sensations. Lerner Publications Co. ISBN 9780822549932.
- Patoski, Joe Nick (1996). Selena: Como La Flor. Boston: Little Brown and Company. ISBN 0-316-69378-2.
- Quintanilla, Selena (2007). Classic Series, Vol. 3 (Media notes). A.B. Quintanilla (producer). Q-Zone Records. 635750012326.
- Roiz, Jessica Lucia (February 19, 2016). "Selena Quintanilla 'Tu No Sabes' Music Video: Rare Clip Filmed In The Eighties Surfaces Online; Watch Here!". Latin Times.
- Scanlon, Michael (May 4, 1987). "Tex-Mex Artist Celebrates Cinco de Mayo". El Paso Times – via Newspapers.com.
- Vargas, Deborah R. (2012). Dissonant divas in chicana music : the limits of la onda. University of Minnesota Press. ISBN 9780816673162.
