= Muñequito de Trapo =

Studio album by Selena y Los Dinos
- Released: 1986
- Recorded: 1986
- Genre: Tejano
- Length: 30:17
- Label: GP Productions
- Producer: A. B. Quintanilla, Manny Guerra

Selena y Los Dinos chronology
Alpha (1986)	Muñequito de Trapo (1986)	And the Winner Is... (1987)

Singles from Muñequito de Trapo
- 1. "A Million to One / Muñequito de Trapo" Released: 1986

Muñequito de Trapo (English: Rag Doll) is the third independent studio album by Tejano music group Selena y Los Dinos. It was released in 1986 under Manny Guerra's GP Productions. The album was originally intended to be an LP for DJ Promotional use only; however, it was later released on cassette. The album mostly consists of cover songs with very little original material. Tim Baker of Newsweek called the album "A return to the 'oldies-rock & roll' sound of the first album."

== Background ==
In the aftermath of the 1981 recession in Texas, former musician Abraham Quintanilla endeavored to propel his children's band Selena y Los Dinos as a means of achieving financial stability following their eviction from their home. The ensemble comprised Selena as the lead vocalist, A. B. Quintanilla as the bassist and producer, and Suzette Quintanilla on drums. The group's roster subsequently expanded to incorporate Ricky Vela on keyboards and Roger Garcia on guitar. The group's second album, Alpha (1986) provided the band with "Dame un Beso", their first commercially acclaimed single. Following the success of Alpha, the group decided that they wanted to record another album right away. Abraham Quintanilla brought together famous composers from Corpus Christi, Texas.

== Reception ==
Having not had an opportunity to record another song in English since their first album Selena y Los Dinos, the group decided to record a cover of the Jimmy Charles 1960 hit A Million to One. Joe Nick Patoski noted that the group’s version was faithful to the original. A Million to One was well received in San Antonio as it was an oldies-but goodies town. The single received plenty of airplay at San Antonio’s KEDA-AM. KEDA DJ Ricky Davila would comment, “Whenever she [Selena] sang in English, she sounded black. She could sing the Commodores like Lionel Richie sang.” A Million to One would suffer the usual limited distribution, but would still climb to the top of the charts at KEDA. It would be the group’s first number one record in the number one market for her music. A Million to One along with Dame Un Beso, would contribute to Selena winning the Tejano Music Award for Female Vocalist of the Year in 1987. The songs Brindis de Amor, La Mirada, Rama Caida, and Muñequito de Trapo were written by Johnny Herrera (credited as Juan H. Barron). The album also includes the Juan Gabriel- penned Diferentes made famous by Rocio Durcal. Selena a fan of Durcal wanted to include the track on the album. Another popular song covered for the album was Enamorada de Ti, written by Daniela Romo and Danilo Vaona and made famous by Romo in 1984.

Joey Guerra of the Houston Chronicle gave the album a positive review stating "Despite the cheesy keyboards prevalent throughout this album, Selena's smooth vocal stylings are a high point, particularly on the sweet title track. The album also contains the original doo-wop version of 'A Million to One', which is more effective than the updated pop version included on 1996's Siempre Selena". Joe Nick Patoski called A Million to One "a swaying, sentimental bellyrubber." Tim Baker of Newsweek commented "Muñequito de Trapo's ballad-heavy feeling would be a first glimpse at the emotionally heavy material Selena would record in the 90s."

== Remastering ==
In 2007, Abraham released Classic Series Vol. 2, remastered tracks of Muñequito de Trapo under his Q-Zone Record label. The instrumental track "El Circo" was replaced with the original version of "Aunque No Salga El Sol" released in 1985 under Bob Griever’s Cara Records.

== Track listing ==
Track listing of Muñequito de Trapo
No.	Title	Writer(s)	Length
1.	"Brindis De Amor"	Juan H. Barron	2:53
2.	"A Million to One"	Phil Medley	3:07
3.	"El Ramalazo"	Tomas Mendez	2:43
4.	"La Mirada"	Juan H. Barron	2:47
5.	"Rama Caida"	Juan H. Barron	3:50
6.	"Diferentes"	Juan Gabriel	2:50
7.	"Muñequito De Trapo"	Juan H. Barron	2:53
8.	"Cuando Despierto"	Ricky Vela	3:44
9.	"Enamorada De Ti"	Daniela Romo, Danilo Vaona	3:13
10.	"El Circo"	Ricky Vela	2:48

2007 re-issue
No.	Title	Writer(s)	Length
1.	"Brindis De Amor"	Juan H. Barron	2:53
2.	"A Million To One"	Phil Medley	3:07
3.	"El Ramalazo"	Tomas Mendez	2:43
4.	"La Mirada"	Juan H. Barron	2:47
5.	"Rama Caida"	Juan H. Barron	3:50
6.	"Diferentes"	Juan Gabriel	2:50
7.	"Muñequito De Trapo"	Juan H. Barron	2:53
8.	"Cuando Despierto"	Ricky Vela	3:44
9.	"Enamorada De Ti"	Daniela Romo, Danilo Vaona	3:13
10.	"Aunque No Salga El Sol"	Johnny Herrera

== Personnel ==
- Selena – vocals
- A.B. Quintanilla – bass, producer
- Suzette Quintanilla – drums
- Roger Garcia – guitar
- Ricky Vela – keyboards
- Manny Guerra – producer
