= Dame Un Beso =

Dame Un Beso may refer to:

- "Dame Un Beso" (Selena y Los Dinos song), 1986
- "Dame Un Beso" (Menudo song), 1982
