= Selena y Los Dinos (album) =

Studio album by Selena y Los Dinos
- Released: July 16, 1984
- Genre: Tejano
- Length: 32:21
- Label: Freddie Records
- Producer: Freddie Martinez

Selena y Los Dinos chronology
Selena y Los Dinos (1984)	Alpha (1986)

Singles from Selena y Los Dinos
- 1. "Ya Se Va" Released: 1984

Selena y Los Dinos (English: Selena and the Guys) is the debut independent studio album by American Tejano music group Selena y Los Dinos. It was released on July 16, 1984 under Freddie Martinez’s Freddie Records. The album was originally released in cassette format and in limited quantities. The album was not sold in stores and Freddie Records did little to promote it. In 1995, the album was re-issued under the title Mis Primeras Grabaciones (English: My First Recordings) and again in 2005, during the 10th anniversary of Selena's passing, with remastered audio tracks.

== Background ==
In 1972, Abraham Quintanilla departed the doo-wop-turned Tejano music group Los Dinos. After dwindling ticket sales and a decline in popularity, Quintanilla refocused on financially supporting his growing family. The music business provided instability for Quintanilla, who received loans from his father that bailed him out of several failed investments he made for Los Dinos. Quintanilla moved his family to Lake Jackson, Texas from Corpus Christi, Texas in hopes of settling down. He found it difficult to retire from music and spent his free time singing. He eventually decided to teach his son A.B. Quintanilla III, how to play guitar. Selena, who was jealous of the attention A.B. was receiving, walked by and pretending to know the lyrics began singing. After realizing that his youngest daughter Selena could sing, Quintanilla recalled, "I saw the continuation of my dreams." In 1980, Quintanilla opened a Tex-Mex restaurant “Papagayos ” with nine-year-old Selena fronting Southern Pearl, which included her older siblings 17-year-old A.B. Quintanilla on bass and 13-year-old Suzette Quintanilla on drums. The group would expand to include Rena Dearman on keyboards and her husband Rodney Pyeatt on Guitar. The band started off performing covers of popular 1950s and 1960s doo-wop oldies.

After the restaurant failed due to the 1980s oil glut that resulted in a Texas recession in 1981, Abraham decided to promote the band, now called Selena y Los Dinos, and moved back to Corpus Christi after the family was evicted from their home. The band performed wherever they could; at street corners, Quinceaneras, and other local venues. Abraham would arrange for the group to record “Tomorrow’s Rains Fall Today” an English version of Lisa Lopez’s 1984 hit “Si Quieres Verme Llorar” at local Corpus Christi label Hacienda Records. However the single was never pressed. Quintanilla would then try down the street at Freddie Records, run by his old friend from his House of Music days, Freddie Martinez . Martinez would recall meeting the group for the first time. “One day Abraham brought Selena in here and said, 'I'd like you to hear my daughter.' I listened to her and immediately said, ‘This little girl is very good,’ and we did the very first album she recorded.” Eventually they signed with Freddie Records. In 1983 due to marriage troubles Dearman and Pyeatt would depart the band and would be replaced with two Brazosport-area musicians, Mike Dean and Del Balint, on keyboards and guitar respectively. In 1983, Selena recorded her first singles "No Puedo Estar Sin Ti"/"Se Acabo Aquel Amor" and "Ya Se Va"/"Tres Veces No" on Freddie Records. The singles received little airplay and generated no sales. In 1984, Freddie Records released the group's first cassette album Selena y Los Dinos. The label provided little promotion and did not want to "waste money" on Selena y Los Dinos, preferring to promote bigger acts already signed by them such as La Sombra, Ramon Ayala, and Laura Canales. Freddie Records confronted Abraham that the group was premature and did not have faith that they would be a commercial threat, telling him "give [the group] another six years before [they would make] it". Abraham pulled Selena y Los Dinos from Freddie Records for Bob Grever's Cara Records.

== Recording and composition ==
Selena y Los Dinos was recorded at Freddie Records studio in Corpus Christi, Texas. The lead single “Ya Se Va” was written by Jorge Antonio Ramirez and produced by Abraham Quintanilla Jr and Freddie Martinez, the head of Freddie Records. The song was mixed by Brian “Red” Moore and served as the albums opening track. The song incorporated Jazz en Español and Chicano Rock. Despite having some extensive airplay in South Texas, the single failed to make an impact on any music chart in the United States or globally. “Ya Se Va” is composed in the key of A major with a time signature in common time, and a moderate groove of 106 beats per minute. Selena later re-recorded the track for her greatest hits album Mis Primeros Exitos (1990). The second single “Se Acabo Aquel Amor” was written by Quintanilla Jr, produced by Martinez, and was mixed by Moore. The song incorporates Chicano Rock, it is composed in the key of B major with a time signature in common time, and a moderate groove of 107 beats per minute.

== Reception and media appearances ==
Tim Baker of Newsweek would give a positive review. Baker described the album as a "New-wave influenced offering... Although not a huge hit, the album's combination of '50s rock & roll, Tejano rhythms and electro-pop synths proved to Selena there was a future in music." Joe Nick Patoski described "Call Me" as "Borrowed shamelessly from 'Slipping and Sliding', and 'Land of 1,000 Dances'."

In 1997 "Se Acabo Aquel Amor" was retitled "Regresa A Mi" and featured in the biographical film Selena. It was also featured in the compilation album Y Sus Inicios.

== Track listing ==
No.	Title	Writer(s)	Length
1.	"Ya Se Va"	Jorge Antonio Ramírez	3:29
2.	"Cruzaré la Montaña"	Juan H. Barrón	4:08
3.	"Se Acabó Aquel Amor"	Abraham Quintanilla, Jr	3:26
4.	"Ya Lo Sé Que Tú Te Vas"	Juan Gabriel	3:24
5.	"Parece Que Va a Llover"	Antonio Matas	2:53
6.	"Tres Veces No"	C. Blanes	4:46
7.	"Give Me One More Chance"	Abraham Quintanilla, Jr	3:24
8.	"Tú Solamente Tú"	Camilo Sesto	4:21
9.	"Lo Tanto Que Te Quiero"	Abraham Quintanilla, Jr.	3:39
10.	"Call Me"	A.B. Quintanilla III	3:06

== Personnel ==
- Selena – vocals
- A.B. Quintanilla – bass, producer
- Suzette Quintanilla – drums
- Dale Balint – guitar
- Mike Dean – keyboards
- Freddie Martinez – producer

== Works cited ==
- Patoski, Joe Nick (1996). Selena- Como La Flor. Little, Brown and Company, Inc. ISBN 0-425-17124-8.
- Baker, Tim (2018). "Selena –The Life and Legacy of Tejano's Queen". Newsweek (Special Edition).
