= Encontre El Amor =

Single by Selena

from the album The New Girl in Town
- B-side: "Soy Feliz"
- Released: October 14, 1983
- Recorded: 1982
- Genre: Latin
- Label: Cara Records
- Producer: Abraham Quintanilla Jr,

Selena singles chronology
"Tres Veces No" (1983)	"Encontre El Amor" (1983)	"Soy Feliz" (1983)

"Encontré el amor" (English: I Found Love) was released as a promotional single from the band Selena y Los Dinos in 1983 from Selena's second album The New Girl in Town.

== Charts ==
Chart (1997)	Peak position
U.S. Hot Latin Tracks	13
