= Nielsen RingScan =

Weekly point-of-sale tracking service

Nielsen RingScan is a weekly point-of-sale tracking service of ringtones and is offered by Nielsen Mobile, a division of a Nielsen Entertainment. RingScan currently reports on polyphonic, master and voice ringtones and will expand to include ringbacks and other types of ringtones. RingScan is utilized as the source material for Billboard Magazine's weekly ringtone charts.

== How Nielsen RingScan tracks sales ==
Full sales data is collected weekly from point-of-sale retailers, being mobile carriers and direct-to-consumer companies. The data is aggregated to produce sales reports for each market represented in RingScan.

== Top Selling Ringtones ==
Top 10 Polyphonic Ringtone – 2006
Rank	Song	Artist
1	Super Mario Bros.	Theme
2	My Humps	The Black Eyed Peas
3	Grillz	Nelly
4	Ms. New Booty	Bubba Sparxxx
5	Laffy Taffy	D4L
6	Pink Panther	Theme
7	Gold Digger	Kanye West
8	Halloween	Movie Theme
9	Mission Impossible	Theme
10	Candy Shop	50 Cent

Top 10 Truetone/Mastertone – 2006
Rank	Song	Artist
1	I'm in love with a stripper	T-Pain
2	Lips of An Angel	Hinder
3	Sexyback	Justin Timberlake
4	Irreplaceable	Beyoncé
5	We Fly High	Jim Jones
6	Money Maker	Ludacris
7	Chain Hang Low	Jibbs
8	My Love	Justin Timberlake
9	I Wanna Love You	Akon
10	Walk It Out	DJ Unk

Top 10 Polyphonic Ringtone – 2005
Rank	Song	Artist
1	Candy Shop	50 Cent
2	Lovers and Friends	Lil Jon & The East Side Boyz
3	Super Mario Brothers	Game Theme
4	Just A Lil Bit	50 Cent
5	Drop It Like It's Hot	Snoop Dogg
6	Wait (The Whisper Song)	Ying Yang Twins
7	Step	Ciara
8	Halloween	Movie Theme
9	Gold Digger	Kanye West
10	We Belong Together	Mariah Carey

== See also ==
- Nielsen SoundScan
- Billboard Hot RingMasters
- Billboard Hot Ringtones
- The Nielsen Company
