= Dulce Amor (album) =

Studio album by Selena y Los Dinos
- Released: 1988
- Recorded: 1987–1988
- Genres: Tejano, jazz fusion, cumbia music
- Length: 32:47
- Label: RP Records
- Producers: Manny Guerra, Timothy Muniz, Lauren Diaz, Carlos Diaz

Selena y Los Dinos chronology
Preciosa (1988)	Dulce Amor (1988)	Selena (1989)

Singles from Dulce Amor
- 1. "Dulce Amor" Released: 1988; 2. "Qué" Released: 1988; 3. "Always Mine" Released: 1988; 4. "Cariño, Cariño Mio" Released: 1988; 5. "Quisiera Darte" Released: 1988

Dulce Amor (English: Sweet Love) is the sixth and last independent studio album by Tejano music group Selena y Los Dinos. The album became the final album to be released from RP Records in 1988. Selena's brother, A.B. Quintanilla III had become the main songwriter. Selena recorded fourteen songs but only released ten. All the songs were recorded in three different recording studios. Dulce Amor helped Selena to be noticed at the 1989 Tejano Music Awards. She was then signed by EMI Latin. This would be the last studio album to be released under “Selena y Los Dinos” as all subsequent albums would be released under “Selena”. The album had only sold over 30,000 copies. It was ordered to be removed from stores by EMI Records.

Most of the songs produced were Tejano music mixed with Cumbia and Jazz fusion. Dulce Amor was nominated for "Album of the Year" while the song of the same name was nominated for "Song of the Year". Selena had won "Female Vocalist of the Year" and "Female Entertainer of the Year". Selena had promoted the album during her Dulce Amor Tour which had only lasted for less than a year. The album had mixed to negative reviews from music critics. The album was re-released in 2007 as "Classic Series Vol. 5".

== Production and development ==
After Selena's fifth album Preciosa (1988) sold only 25,000 copies, the company had wanted Selena to record another record. The success from Preciosa had the company believing that Selena would sell more copies with her next album. In July 1988, Selena was in the recording studio and began recording songs. Her brother, A.B. Quintanilla III had become the main songwriter for Selena. Juan Gabriel, a Mexican songwriter, had given Selena the rights to record "Costumbres". Ricky Vela, a Selena y Los Dinos member, had written the song "Quisiera Darte". The song "Qué" was written by Manny Guerra, the record manager for RP Records and GP Productions. The songs "Tú Solamente Tú" and "La Puerta Se Cerro" were written by unknown writers. On the liner notes, the writing credits are given to "Pendiente" which means "Pending" in Spanish.

It had taken Selena three weeks to record fourteen songs. However, the record company only had wanted ten songs to be on the album. The others remained unreleased. Selena had recorded the songs "Dulce Amor", "Tú Solamente Tú", "La Puerta Se Cerro", "Costumbres", and "Dime" at RP Records studios in San Antonio, Texas. The songs "Always Mine", "No Llores Más Corazón" and "Cariño, Cariño Mio" were recorded in Houston, Texas. "Quisiera Darte" and the unreleased tracks were recorded in Hollywood, California. The song "Tú Solamente Tú" was originally recorded by Selena for her debut album Mis Primeras Grabaciones (1984).

While Selena was performing at the 1989 Tejano Music Awards, Jose Behar (who was the former head of Sony Music Latin) was among the audience that night. He instantly wanted Selena to sign with EMI. Behar called his boss stating that he believe he had found the next Gloria Estefan. His boss told him that he was crazy, because Behar only had been in South Texas for only a week. Selena was later signed with EMI Latin the following year. Dulce Amor became her last independent LP record.

== Release ==
Dulce Amor was released on 24 December 1988. The album was supposed to be released in the summer of 1989. However, Manny Guerra had wanted the album to be released quickly. Guerra believed that if the album would have been released in the summer, that not too many Tejano fans would buy the album. He said, because popular music albums are released in that period. When the album was released, it had sold only 2,000 copies the first day. Preciosa (1988) had sold 3,600 copies on its first day. Guerra was not happy about the sales of the album. However, within a month the album sold 10,000 copies. It outperformed all of Selena's previous records. By August 1989, the album sold 33,206 copies. It was then pulled off shelves because of Selena's upcoming debut album with EMI Latin. EMI Latin bought all the original copies of the album. Only 50,000 copies of the album were shipped in Texas alone.

In 1995, Selena's father, Abraham Quintanilla Jr., had bought the rights to Selena's albums (1984–1989 period) from EMI Latin. Since then, he has released the songs in compilation albums. The songs "Always Mine", "No Llores Mas Corazon" and "La Puerta Se Cerro" were selected to be remixed for Anthology (1998).

On 7 September 2007, Quintanilla Jr re-released the album as part of the "Classic Series" collection. "Dulce Amor" was then re-titled "Classic Series Vol. 5". All the songs were remastered.

== Composition ==
"Dulce Amor" ("Sweet Love") the title track was the lead single from Dulce Amor. The song was written by A.B. Quintanilla III. It was produced by Timothy Muniz. "Dulce Amor" was nominated for "Song of the Year" at the 1989 Tejano Music Awards. The song had its key signature in common time. It was performed on G minor with 106 beats per minute. The songs lyrics are about a girl expressing her emotions about a guy she really love. The song was mixed with Cumbia music and Jazz fusion.

"Qué" ("What") was the second single released from Dulce Amor. The song's writer is unknown. It was produced by Manny Guerra. The song was performed on G minor with 147 beats per minute. The songs lyrics are about a girl who has been tricked into believing that a guy really loved her. She feels a sense of loneliness and doubts herself. The songs' message is that, you can't always trust someone until you get to know them for who they really are. The song was mixed with Ranchera music and Mariachi.

"Always Mine" was the third single released from Dulce Amor. The song was written by A.B. Quintanilla III. It was produced by Roger Garcia, who was the former back-up guitarist for Selena y Los Dinos. "Always Mine" was selected to be remixed for Anthology (1998). The remixed version peaked at number four on the Hot Dance Club Songs chart and number 94 on the Canadian Hot 100. The song describes a teen romance. A young girl who is under peer pressure by her friends must decide who she wants to be with. She struggles with low self-esteem. The song had its key signature in common time. It was performed on B minor with 100 beats per minute. The song was mixed with Polka, Pop and Contemporary R&B.

"Cariño, Cariño Mio" ("Sweetheart, Sweetheart of Mine") was the fourth single released from Dulce Amor. The song was written by A.B. Quintanilla III. It was produced by Lauren and Carlos Diaz. The songs lyrics are about a girl who is in love with a guy. She sings about giving anything to him, just to be with him. The song had its key signature in common time. It was performed on D major with 103 beats per minute. The song was mixed with Polka and Jazz.

"Quisiera Darte" ("I Give") was the fifth and final single released from Dulce Amor. The song was written by Ricky Vela, who was the lead keyboardist for Selena y Los Dinos. The song was produced by Manny Guerra. The songs lyrics are about a girl asking her boyfriend if their relationship is "love". She tells him that she would do anything for him, and feels that their relationship is love. The song had its key signature in common time. It was performed on C minor with 93 beats per minute. The song was mixed with Jazz and Cumbia music.

== Promotion ==
Selena had promoted Dulce Amor during her Dulce Amor Tour. Selena also promoted Preciosa (1988) along with her Dulce Amor Tour. This was because the two albums were released in the same year. Selena had performed songs from Dulce Amor on the Johnny Canales Show in South Texas, she also had done live concerts across Texas. Selena earned $20,000 from the Dulce Amor Tour, which was double the amount she had made for her Preciosa Tour.

== Critical reception ==
Norberto Garcia of Texas Monthly stated that Dulce Amor was one of Selena's "strongest" LP record because it "showcase her exotic voice and expanded her talents[...]". Domingo Rivera of Tejano Nation believed every song on Dulce Amor was horrible. Rivera stated that he did not like not even one song. He also stated that Selena could have done better with modern styles of Tejano music instead of mixing 1960s music into her songs. Rivera then stated the album was "out of date" even when it was released in 1988. Sophia Vargas of Tejano Weekly believed that "Dulce Amor" was not Selena's best of work. Vargas believed that RP Records did not put their "all" for Selena.

== Track listing ==
No.	Title	Writer(s)	Length
1.	"Dulce Amor"	A.B. Quintanilla III	3:19
2.	"Qué"	Manny Guerra	3:38
3.	"Tú Solamente Tú" (Re-recording)	Camilo Sesto	2:35
4.	"Always Mine"	Quintanilla III	3:50
5.	"Costumbres"	Juan Gabriel	3:50
6.	"Dime"	Quintanilla III	3:26
7.	"No Llores Más Corazón"	Quintanilla III	3:17
8.	"La Puerta Se Cerro"	Quintanilla III	2:51
9.	"Cariño, Cariño Mio"	Quintanilla III	3:28
10.	"Quisiera Darte"	Ricky Vela	3:02

== Awards and nominations ==
Year	Awards ceremony	Award	Results
1989	Tejano Music Awards	Song of the Year	Nominated
1989	Tejano Music Awards	Album of the Year	Nominated
1989	Tejano Music Awards	Female Vocalist of the Year	Won
1989	Tejano Music Awards	Female Entertainer of the year	Won

== Personnel ==
Credits are taken from the album's liner notes.

- Selena – vocals, background vocals, clothing design
- A.B. Quintanilla III – guitar, background vocals, songwriting, mixing assistant
- Roger Garcia – guitar, background vocals
- Henry Gomez – guitar
- Lavonne Rodriguez – background vocals
- Suzette Quintanilla – drums
- Ricky Vela – keyboards, songwriting
- Juan Gabriel – songwriting
- Yvette Zabala – art direction
- Barbra Moore – make-up, stylist
- William Carmona – photography
- Manny Guerra – producer, marketing, mixing
- Brian "Red" Moore – engineering
- Abraham Quintanilla Jr – engineering assistant
- Timothy Muniz – executive producer
- Lauren Diaz – executive producer
- Carlos Diaz – executive producer
