= El Chico del Apartamento 512 =

Promotional single by Selena

from the album Amor Prohibido
- Language: Spanish
- English title: "The Boy from Apartment 512"
- A-side: "Fotos y Recuerdos"
- Released: January 1995
- Studio: AMEN Studios (San Antonio, TX)
- Genre: Mexican cumbia
- Length: 3:29
- Label: EMI Latin
- Songwriters: Ricky Vela; A.B. Quintanilla; Samuel "Sammy" Morales
- Producers: A.B.; Bebu Silvetti

Live video
- "El Chico del Apartamento 512" on YouTube

"El Chico del Apartamento 512" is a song recorded by American singer Selena for her fourth studio album, Amor Prohibido (1994). It was released along with "Fotos y Recuerdos" in January 1995, serving as its B-side track. Written by Ricky Vela, "El Chico del Apartamento 512" is a cumbia song with influences of Colombian and South American music. Lyrically, the song describes a female protagonist who knocks on her love interest's apartment door (number 512) and is heartbroken when his sister (who she initially mistakes for his girlfriend) answers it. Justino Aguilar of Billboard magazine, called "El Chico del Apartamento 512" as one of Selena's "most memorable songs". The track posthumously peaked at number one on the U.S. Billboard Regional Mexican Digital Songs chart in 2011.

== Background and composition ==
"El Chico del Apartamento 512" was written by Ricky Vela, the keyboardist of Selena y Los Dinos. The song was co-written by Selena's brother-producer A.B. Quintanilla who, along with Argentine musician Bebu Silvetti, served as producers. Musicologist Howard Blumenthal called the song's production "perfect" in his book The World Music CD Listener's Guide (1998).

"El Chico del Apartamento 512" is a Spanish-language cumbia with influences of Colombian and South American music. Vela said in a 2002 interview that the track was "the least Tejano music song" because of its musically diverse sounds. Musicologists Ilan Stavans and Harold Augenbraum called the song "brassy" and noticed how the lyrics are constructed in story-song form. The "512" in the song's title is a reference to Corpus Christi, Texas' former area code. The recording is written in the key of C major and is played in a moderate groove of 102 beats per minute. It incorporates music from several musical instruments, including the French horn, violin and piano.

"El Chico del Apartamento 512" is musically similar to Selena's 1994 single "Bidi Bidi Bom Bom"; author James E. Perone called them recurring themes where the protagonist is "attracted to a young man". Lyrically, Selena is heartbroken after knocking on her love interest's apartment door (number 512) and mistaking his sister for his girlfriend, before the sister asks "are you looking for my brother?". Italian essayists Gaetano Prampolini and Annamaria Pinazzi called the song a "funny love reversal".

== Critical reception and legacy ==
Justino Aguilar of Billboard magazine, called "El Chico del Apartamento 512" as one of her "most memorable songs". "El Chico del Apartamento 512" was later reworked and included on Selena's posthumously released remix/duet album Enamorada de Ti (2012). Writer Joey Guerra of the San Antonio Express-News, called it a "bouncy cumbia" that was "taken down a few notches to a chirpy midtempo." and wrote that the new sound is "not bad, but it loses a lot of the melody's force." Guerra believed American entertainer Selena Gomez (who was featured on "Bidi Bidi Bom Bom" for the album) should have been used on "El Chico del Apartamento 512" instead. Domingo Banda of the Semana News called "El Chico del Apartamento 512" a "relaxed reggae" track. Brian Galindo of BuzzFeed called "El Chico del Apartamento 512" danceable and "catchy".

Selena performed the song on her final performance on March 19, 1995, during the Calle Ocho Festival in Miami, which attracted over 100,000 fans. Selena was shot and killed by Yolanda Saldívar, her friend and former manager of the singer's Selena Etc. clothing boutiques, on March 31, 1995. The song is still played at events throughout Texas. Since its release, the song has been included on music critics "best of Selena songs" list including BuzzFeed (at number ten), and Latina magazine (at number six). American singer Kris Melody and Mexican group Los Tigrillos recorded the song for the tribute album Mexico Recuerda a Selena (2005). Mexican singer Graciela Beltrán performed and recorded "El Chico del Apartamento 512" for the live televised tribute concert Selena ¡VIVE! in April 2005. Dominican bachata singer Antony Santos recorded the song for his album Ay! Ven (2006).

== Track listing ==
US Single

1. "Fotos y Recuerdos" – 2:45
2. "El Chico del Apartamento 512" – 3:29

== Charts ==
| Chart (1995) | Peak position |
|---|---|
| Mexico Grupera Songs (El Siglo de Torreón) | 11 |
| Chart (2011) | Peak position |
| US Regional Mexican Digital Song Sales | 1 |

== Certifications ==
| Region | Certification | Certified units/sales |
|---|---|---|
| United States (RIAA) | 2× Platinum (Latin) | 120,000^{‡} |
^{‡} Sales+streaming figures based on certification alone.

== Credits and personnel ==
Credits adapted from Amor Prohibido liner notes.

- Selena – vocals
- Joe Ojeda – keyboards
- Ricky Vela – keyboards
- Chris Pérez – guitar
- Suzette Quintanilla – drums
- Los Dinos – bajo sexto
- A.B. Quintanilla – writer
- Pete Astudillo – writer
- Lisette Lorenzo – art direction
- A.B. Quintanilla III, Bebu Silvetti – producers

== See also ==
- Latin music in the United States

== Notes ==
- Patoski, Joe Nick (1996). Selena: Como La Flor. Boston: Little Brown and Company. ISBN 0-316-69378-2.
- Prampolini, Gaetano; Pinazzi, Annamaria (2013). Essays on the Literary Cultures of the American Southwest. Firenze University Press. ISBN 978-8866553939.
- Perone, James E. (2012). The Album: A Guide to Pop Music's Most Provocative, Influential, and Important Creations. ABC-CLIO. ISBN 978-0313379079.
- Stavans, Ilan; Augenbraum, Harold (2005). Encyclopedia Latina: history, culture, and society in the United States. Grolier Academic Reference. ISBN 0717258157.
- Blumenthal, Howard J. (1998). The world music CD listener's guide. New York: Billboard Books. ISBN 0823076636.
