= Johnny Canales =

Mexican singer and broadcaster (1942–2024)

- Born: Juan José Canales; August 23, 1942; General Treviño, Nuevo León, Mexico
- Died: June 12, 2024 (aged 81); Corpus Christi, Texas, U.S.
- Occupations: Tejano singer; television host
- Spouse: Nora (m.1995)

Juan José Canales (August 23, 1942 – June 12, 2024) was a Mexican Tejano singer and host of the television show "The Johnny Canales Show". Canales was credited with one of the first live performances of vocalist Selena by her 13th birthday. He took Selena y Los Dinos for their first concerts in Mexico. As a radio DJ in 1974, Canales gave Ruben Naranjo considerable airplay.

== Early life ==
Juan José Canales was born in General Treviño on August 23, 1942.

== The Johnny Canales Show ==
Johnny Canales was the executive producer for The Johnny Canales Show which debuted in 1983. His program showcased emerging bands from Mexico and the United States. Some of his guests included La Sombra de Chicago, Selena, Nancy, La Mafia, Mazz, Intocable, Grupo Pegasso De Emilio Reyna, Fama, Jaime y Los Chamacos, Jennifer Peña, Los Tigres del Norte and Los Relámpagos del Norte and many more. It aired on Televisa in Mexico and Univision in the United States from 1988 until 1996.

In 1996, Canales made the transition to the Telemundo Network. On November 12, 1997, Canales was interviewed for the UTA Center for Mexican American Studies Oral History Project. In 2002, Johnny Canales reached an agreement to bring his show back to Televisa and arranged to start touring again, doing shows in the Southwest part of the United States and Mexico. The show also aired on TuVision from August 2008 to November 2009.

Telemundo canceled the show in 2005, prompting Canales to file a lawsuit against the network. The lawsuit claimed the network engaged in fraudulent and deceptive business practices against Canales, interfered with other business opportunities and ruined Canales' reputation. At the time of the lawsuit, Canales was seeking $100 million. The suit was later dropped.

== Later career ==
On May 31, 2009, Canales received a "Veteran of the Year" award from LULAC for his work on behalf of the G.I. Forum.

Canales' wife, Nora, said they tried to film a pilot in 2008 but the project came to a standstill after he suffered a series of health problems including a stroke. After heart surgery and physical therapy he made a full recovery, but he continued to have health problems until his death.

On March 29, 2011, Canales compiled a free show at the American Bank Center's Selena Auditorium in Corpus Christi, Texas. It featured performances from Grammy Award-winning acts such as Ramon Ayala, Ruben Ramos & The Texas Revolution, Los Palominos and many others. It was recorded and edited into a pilot, which Canales planned in pitching to networks, in efforts of getting the show back on the air.

== Death ==
Canales died in Corpus Christi on June 12, 2024, at age 81.
