= Alpha (Selena y Los Dinos album) =

Studio album by Selena y Los Dinos
- Released: 1986
- Genre: Latin pop, pop rock
- Length: 32:16
- Language: Spanish
- Label: G.P. Productions
- Producer: A.B. Quintanilla

Selena y Los Dinos chronology
The New Girl in Town (1985)	Alpha (1986)	Muñequito de Trapo (1987)

Singles from Alpha
- 1. "Dame un Beso/Con Esta Copa" Released: 1986

Alpha is the debut studio album by American Tejano music group Selena y Los Dinos. Released in 1986 under Manny Guerra's G.P. Productions, it followed two albums the group recorded under different indie music labels. Selena y Los Dinos, led by vocalist Selena, recorded mostly cover songs. Wanting to stand out, bassist A.B. Quintanilla requested original material from Luis Silva after noticing his track record for writing award-winning songs. Silva ignored A.B.'s request, and Abraham inspired him to write songs. The group expanded to include keyboardist Ricky Vela and guitarist Roger Garcia. Vela collaborated with A.B. on "Dame un Beso", while he collaborated with Abraham on "Dame Tu Amor". A.B. became Selena y Los Dinos' music producer and songwriter, while Abraham encouraged them to record songs of various genres to appeal to a wider audience. Despite her limited Spanish, Selena recorded all nine tracks phonetically.

"Dame un Beso" was released on radio and generated considerable airplay, becoming Selena's first commercially acclaimed single of her career. It reached number one on radio stations in El Paso, Texas. The song was nominated at the 1987 Tejano Music Awards for Single of the Year and Song of the Year. Alpha led Selena to be nominated for the Tejano Music Award for Female Vocalist of the Year and win the Tejano Music Award for Female Entertainer of the Year. The group's struggles during the production of the album were dramatized by Christian Serratos and Gabriel Chavarria as Selena and A.B., respectively, in Netflix's two-part limited drama, Selena: The Series (2020–21). The tracks "Dame un Beso" and "Dame Tu Amor" experienced a resurgence in popularity in the 21st century; the former peaked at number 25 on the US Billboard Latin Digital Song Sales chart in 2020, while the latter peaked at number 31 on the Hot Ringtones chart in 2006.

== Background and production ==
In 1972, Abraham Quintanilla departed the doo-wop-turned Tejano music group Los Dinos. Following dwindling ticket sales and waning popularity, Quintanilla refocused on financially supporting his growing family. The music business provided instability for Quintanilla, who received loans from his father that bailed him out of several failed investments he made for Los Dinos. Quintanilla moved his family to Lake Jackson, Texas from Corpus Christi, Texas in hopes of settling down. Though he stepped away from music, he kept singing in his spare time. After realizing that his youngest daughter Selena could sing, Quintanilla recalled, "I saw the continuation of my dreams." In 1980, Quintanilla opened a Tex-Mex restaurant with nine-year-old Selena fronting Southern Pearl, which included her older siblings 17-year-old A.B. Quintanilla on bass and 13-year-old Suzette Quintanilla on drums. After the restaurant failed due to the 1980s oil glut, Abraham decided to promote the band, now called Selena y Los Dinos, and moved back to Corpus Christi after the family was evicted from their home. In 1983, Selena recorded her first singles "No Puedo Estar Sin Ti"/"Se Acabo Aquel Amor" and "Ya Se Va"/"Tres Veces No" on Freddie Records. The singles received little airplay and generated no sales. In 1984, Freddie Records released the group's first cassette album Selena y Los Dinos. The label provided little promotion and did not want to "waste money" on Selena y Los Dinos, preferring to promote bigger acts already signed by them. Freddie Records confronted Abraham that the group was premature and did not have faith that they would be a commercial threat, telling him "give [the group] another six years before [they would make] it". Abraham pulled Selena y Los Dinos from Freddie Records for Bob Grever's Cara Records. They recorded The New Girl in Town which was released on cassette in 1985. Grever's music producer Manny Guerra departed Cara and formed his label G.P. Productions. He dissolved Selena y Los Dinos' contract with Cara, and the group began recording under Guerra's label in 1986.

A.B. was frustrated that Selena y Los Dinos recorded mostly cover songs and wanted original compositions to stand out; he recalled "we had no songs. We were constantly looking for material". He approached award-winning songwriter Luis Silva, who ignored A.B.'s requests for original songs, which made him upset. Abraham encouraged him to write songs himself, which A.B. recalled "was the beginning" of creating "Dame un Beso". He became the group's music producer and songwriter. Selena y Los Dinos expanded to include Ricky Vela on keyboards and Roger Garcia on guitar; both were replacements of Rena Dearman and her husband, Rodney Pyatt, respectively. A.B. collaborated with Vela on "Dame un Beso", their first songwriting credit. B-side, "Con Esta Copa", was a cover of the original Los Dinos' single. Vela collaborated with Abraham on "Dame Tu Amor", their first collaboration. The track, "Lo Dejo Solo", which was penned by Vela in 1986, was shelved and remained unreleased until 2006 on the posthumous re-issue titled Classic Series, Vol. I, replacing the instrumental "El Tejano", also penned by Vela. Abraham preferred that the group record various genres for Alpha to appeal to a wider audience. He found that the Valley enjoyed accordion-based music, while in West Texas listeners preferred cumbias, and Houston and Dallas audiences liked pop music. Alpha is a Latin pop and rock pop album, with stylistic influences of Tejano, adult contemporary, dance-pop, and regional Mexican music. Daniel Bustamente, the record producer of Houston's Festival Chicano, recalled the music Selena performed at her first appearance at Miller Outdoor Theater as being "still not as full, but she always impressed everybody with that voice. The way she was able to do different things with her voice was like an opera singer, in a sense." Despite her limited Spanish, Selena recorded all nine tracks phonetically.

== Reception and media appearances ==
Professional ratings
Review scores
Source	Rating
Allmusic	3/5 stars

Joey Guerra of the Houston Chronicle ranked Alpha at number 15 on his list of the best Selena albums. Guerra called the record a "hard-to-find album" and named "Dame un Beso" as one of Selena's "first minor hits". Rob Harvilla of The Ringer urged readers to watch Selena's 1987 performance of "Dame un Beso" on YouTube, writing that viewers "can hear her outfit: the probably homemade sparkly silver spacesuit, the towering poof of hair that doubles the size of her head. You know what she looks like even if you're not looking at her". Steve Legget of Allmusic found Classic Series, Vol. I as a shorter version of its predecessor Y Sus Inicios, Vol. I (2003), the first volume of an album series issued under Q-Zone Records that chronicled Selena's recordings before her contractual commitments with EMI Latin. Legget criticized Selena as premature in Classic Series, Vol. I, despite her mature vocals for her age. Finding little of the track listing to ignite any interest, Legget finds the overall releases of her early recordings as being "worth their weight in gold."

Selena y Los Dinos's struggles during the production of Alpha were dramatized by Christian Serratos and Gabriel Chavarria as Selena and A.B., respectively, in Netflix's two-part limited drama Selena: The Series (2020–21). In the series, A.B. looks at previous Tejano Music Award for Songwriter of the Year winners, noticing that Silva is the top-awarded writer. He requested original material from Silva at the 1986 Tejano Music Awards (TMAs), but Silva was unwilling to provide songs to "a bunch of kids". After persuading Silva to provide the group with two songs, he regretted his decision the following day. Feeling defeated, A.B. isolates himself in his room, and Abraham encourages A.B. to write songs. A.B. teaches himself how to write songs by listening to previous winners, understanding a song's musical structure, and scale. In the series, Serratos lip-syncs to the group's works. Savannah Walsh of Elle called the scene an "exhilarating performance". Marco Torres of Houstonia recalled listening to "Dame un Beso" two decades ago during Tejano music's golden age, finding the inclusion of the song in the series as nostalgic.

== Commercial performance and awards ==
Alpha was a moderate success for the group, which provided them with a growing fan base. The album led Selena to be nominated for the Tejano Music Award for Female Vocalist of the Year at the 1987 Tejano Music Awards. Selena's win for the Tejano Music Award for Entertainer of the Year flabbergasted audiences that a 15-year-old dethroned the genre's frontwoman Laura Canales. Selena y Los Dinos was also nominated for Most Promising Band, making Selena the only female artist to be nominated outside of the Female Vocalist category. Alpha was also nominated for the Tejano Music Award for Album of the Year.

"Dame un Beso" was released on radio and generated considerable airplay, becoming Selena's first commercially acclaimed single of her career. The song was one of the most played songs on radio stations in Texas while ranking at number one in El Paso, Texas. Radio stations KBNA, a bilingual station with the highest audience impressions in El Paso, and XZOL reported "Dame un Beso" received "plenty of spins". The song generated spins on Radio Cañón-owned stations in Ciudad Juárez. The song was also nominated at the 1987 Tejano Music Awards for both Single of the Year and Song of the Year. "Dame un Beso" and "Dame Tu Amor" received a resurgence in popularity in the 21st century; the former peaked at number 25 on the US Billboard Latin Digital Song Sales chart in 2020, while the latter peaked at number 31 on the Hot Ringtones chart in 2006.

== Track listing ==
Track listing of Alpha
No.	Title	Writer(s)	Length
1.	"Dame un Beso"	A.B. Quintanilla, Ricky Vela	3:44
2.	"Con Esta Copa"	Johnny Herrera	3:00
3.	"Soy Amiga"	Vela	4:03
4.	"Corazoncito"	A.B., Manny Guerra	2:29
5.	"Sentimientos"	Al Hurricane, Tiny Morrie	3:15
6.	"Pero Cómo Te Ha Ido"	Herrera	3:04
7.	"Pa'Qué Me Sirve La Vida"	Chucho Monge	3:20
8.	"Pensando en Ti"	Vela, Roger Garcia	4:07
9.	"El Tejano"	Vela, Guerra	2:00
10.	"Dame Tu Amor"	Vela, Abraham Quintanilla	3:44
Total length:			33:32

2006 re-issue
No.	Title	Writer(s)	Length
1.	"Dame un Beso"	A.B., Vela	3:44
2.	"Con Esta Copa"	Herrera	3:00
3.	"Soy Amiga"	Vela	4:03
4.	"Corazoncito"	A.B., Guerra	2:29
5.	"Sentimientos"	Al Hurricane, Morrie	3:15
6.	"Pero Cómo Te Ha Ido"	Herrera	3:04
7.	"Pa'Qué Me Sirve La Vida"	Monge	3:20
8.	"Pensando en Ti"	Vela, Garcia	4:07
9.	"Lo Dejo Solo"	Vela	3:31
10.	"Dame Tu Amor"	Vela, Abraham	3:44

== See also ==
- Selena albums discography
- Latin American music in the United States

== Works cited ==
- Legget, Steve (n.d.). "Selena Classic Series, Vol. 1 > Album Review". Allmusic.
- Patoski, Joe Nick (1996). Selena: Como La Flor. Boston: Little Brown and Company. ISBN 0-316-69378-2.
- Walsh, Savannah (December 30, 2020). "Is Christian Serratos Really Singing in 'Selena: The Series'?". Elle.
- Torres, Marco (December 16, 2020). "Not Everything is Perfect, but 'Selena: The Series' is Worth a Watch". Houstonia.
- Guerra, Joey. "Ranking Selena's albums: 'Dulce Amor' to 'Dreaming of You'". Houston Chronicle.
- Harvilla, Rob (March 31, 2021). "'60 Songs That Explain the '90s': A Glimpse of Selena, the Global Superstar". The Ringer.
- Joseph, Harriett Denise (2018). From Santa Anna to Selena : notable Mexicanos and Tejanos in Texas history since 1821. University of North Texas Press. ISBN 978-1574417234.
- Jones, Veda Boyd (2013). Selena. Infobase Learning. ISBN 978-1438146379.
- Marquez, Herón (2001). Latin Sensations. Lerner Publications Co. ISBN 082254993X.
- Perez, Chris (2012). To Selena, with Love. Penguin Books. ISBN 978-1-101-58026-4.
- Bisantz, Kate; Bisantz, Max (2018). Who Was...Selena?. Penguin Books. p. 112. ISBN 978-1101995501.
- Mitchell, Rick (May 5, 1995). "In life, she was the queen of Tejano music. In death, the 23-year-old singer is becoming a legend". Houston Chronicle.
- Quintanilla, Selena (2006). Classic Series, Vol. I (Media notes). A.B. Quintanilla](producer). Q-Productions. 635750012128.
- Lapham, Bob (July 22, 1988). "Selena Headlines Show". Abilene Reporter-News – via Newspapers.com.
- Zamora, Moisés (December 4, 2020). "Dame Un Beso". Selena: The Series. Season 1. Episode 2. Netflix.
- Bustios, Pamela (December 16, 2020). "Selena Returns to Latin Pop Albums Chart With 'Selena: The Series Soundtrack'" (PDF). Billboard Pro.
- "Hot Ringtones > September 23, 2006". Billboard. Archived from the original on May 3, 2026.
