= Dame Un Beso (Selena y Los Dinos song) =

Single by Selena y Los Dinos

from the album Alpha
- Released: January 25, 1986
- Recorded: 1985
- Genre: Latin
- Length: 3:37
- Label: Manny Labels
- Songwriters: AB Quintanilla III & Ricky Vela
- Producer: Abraham Quintanilla Jr.

Selena y Los Dinos singles chronology
"Un Primer Amor" (1985)	"Dame Un Beso" (1986)	"Con esta copa" (1987)

"Dame Un Beso" (English translation: "Give Me a Kiss") is a 1986 song by American singer Selena, from her third album, Alpha. It was recorded when she was 14 years old. The song was written by A. B. Quintanilla and Ricky Vela, who were both in her band at the time. A. B. Quintanilla, Selena's brother, had grown tired of the more old-fashioned songs that his father would choose and write, and decided to take over and write almost all of her songs.

Soon after its release, Selena, then 15, won the awards for both "Female Vocalist of the Year" and "Performer of the Year" at the Tejano Music Awards.. For that success "Dame Un Beso" was released as a vinyl, LP, and EP in 1986. "Dame Un Beso" has since been released on various of Selena's posthumous greatest-hits compilation albums.

== Albums released ==
These albums have included the song "Dame Un Beso":

- Alpha 1986
- Mis Primeros Éxitos, 1990
- Selena Y Sus Inicios Vol. 1, 2001
- Classic Series, Vol. 1 2007
- Inolvidable, 2009
