= Ricky Vela =

- Also known as: Rick; Ricky
- Born: Ricardo Vela
- Origin: Corpus Christi, Texas, United States
- Genres: Tejano; cumbia; ranchera; Latin pop; Spanish pop; R&B; pop
- Occupations: Songwriter; keyboardist
- Instrument: Keyboards
- Years active: 1984–1997
- Label: EMI Latin
- Formerly of: Selena y Los Dinos
- Website: Q-Productions.com

Ricardo Vela is an American musician and songwriter who was the keyboardist for the band Selena y Los Dinos from 1984 to 1995.

== Works ==
Vela has either written or co-written the following songs that topped on Billboard 200, Billboard Latin Songs, and Mexican Regional Songs charts.

Name of Song	Peak position	Year
"Dame Un Beso"	N/A	1986
"Soy Amiga"	N/A	1986
"Dame Tu Amor"	31 (Billboard Hot Ringtones, 2006) 6 (Billboard Hot Latin Songs)	1986
"Cuando Despierto"	N/A	1987
"Tu No Sabes"	N/A	1987
"Ven A Verme"	N/A	1987
"Sabes"	N/A	1988
"Como Te Quiero/Yo A Ti"	N/A	1988
"Como Quisisera"	N/A	1988
"Cariño Mio"	N/A	1988
"Quisiera Darte"	N/A	1988
"Tengo Ganas De Llorar"	N/A	1990
"Si La Quieres"	N/A	1992
"Yo Te Sigo Queriendo"	N/A	1992
"Las Cadenas"	N/A	1992
"No Debes Jugar"	3 (Billboard Hot Latin Tracks) 3 (Billboard Latin Regional Mexican Airplay) 3 (Latin Pop Airplay)	1993
"La Llamada"	5 (Billboard Hot Latin Tracks) 6 (Latin Regional Mexican Airplay) 8 (Latin Pop Airplay)	1993
"Tu Robaste Mi Corazon"	5 (Billboard Latin Tracks) 8 (Billboard Latin Regional Mexican Airplay) 6 (Billboard Latin Pop)	1993
"No Me Queda Más"	1 (Hot Latin Tracks) 1 (Latin Regional Airplay) 13 (Latin Pop Airplay)	1994
"'Fotos y Recuerdos"	1 (Hot Latin Tracks) 1 (Latin Regional Mexican Airplay) 12 (Latin Pop Airplay)	1994
"El Chico del Apartamento 512"	6 (Hot Latin Charts) 7 (Latin Regional Mexican Airplay) 6 (Latin Pop Airplay)	1994
"Tus Desprecios"	N/A	1994
"Ya No"	N/A	1994
"Fuiste Mala"	N/A	1999
"Esperandote"	6 (Hot Latin Charts) 3 (Latin Pop Airplay)	1996

== Awards and nominations ==
Ricky Vela has been nominated for seven awards and won two awards.

== Portrayals in media ==
Vela appears as himself in the 1997 film Selena. He is portrayed in the 2020 Netflix television show Selena: The Series by Hunter Reese Peña.
