= Hot Ringtones =

Billboard chart

Hot Ringtones (also known as just Ringtones) was a record chart published weekly by Billboard. It is their first chart to be published that ranks the most popular ringtones.

The chart was quietly discontinued on December 6, 2014; the final chart was released on November 29, 2014, and the final number-one song on the chart was "Shake It Off" by Taylor Swift.

== Background ==
On October 26, 2004, Billboard staff announced that they would be adding a new chart for ringtones.

== Hot RingMasters ==
In 2006, Billboard introduced a new ringtones chart titled Hot RingMasters. The first number one song on the Hot RingMasters chart, for the issue dated December 2, 2006, was "Smack That" by Akon and Eminem.

== Hot MasterTones ==
On April 3, 2006, John Kilcullen, president and publisher of Billboard Information Group, and Geoff Mayfield, Billboard's director of charts, announced a new Billboard ringtone chart titled "Hot MasterTones" at Billboard MECCA 2006.
