= Selena =

American singer-songwriter (1971–1995)

- Selena in 1986
- Born: Selena Quintanilla; April 16, 1971; Lake Jackson, Texas, U.S.
- Died: March 31, 1995 (aged 23); Corpus Christi, Texas, U.S.
- Cause of death: Gunshot wound
- Resting place: Seaside Memorial Park, Corpus Christi, Texas, U.S.
- Monuments: Mirador de la Flor
- Other name: Selena Quintanilla-Pérez
- Education: Pacific Western University (BBA)
- Occupations: Singer; songwriter; fashion designer; dancer; model; entrepreneur
- Years active: 1981–1995
- Works: Albums; singles; videography
- Spouse: Chris Pérez (m. 1992)
- Parents: Marcella Ofelia Samora; Abraham Isaac Quintanilla Jr.
- Relatives: A.B. Quintanilla (brother); Suzette Quintanilla (sister)
- Awards: Full list
- Musical career
- Genres: Tejano; Tex-Mex cumbia; Latin pop
- Labels: Q-Productions; Capitol Latin; EMI; Universal Music Latin; SBK Records
- Formerly of: Selena y Los Dinos

Logo
- Website: q-productions.com

Selena Quintanilla-Pérez (Latin American Spanish: [seˈlena kintaˈniʝa ˈpeɾes]; April 16, 1971 – March 31, 1995), known mononymously as Selena, was an American singer-songwriter, fashion designer, and business owner. Known as the "Queen of Tejano Music", she is known for her contributions to popular music and fashion, which made her one of the most celebrated Mexican-American entertainers of the late 20th century. Media outlets called her the "Tejano Madonna" for her clothing choices. (Note: Media outlets that called Selena the "Mexican American equivalent" of Madonna include The Victoria Advocate, The New York Times, MTV News, and Rhapsody.) She also ranks among the most influential Latin artists of all time and is credited for catapulting the Tejano genre into the mainstream market.

The youngest child of the Quintanilla family, she debuted on the music scene as a member of the band Selena y Los Dinos, which also included her elder siblings A.B. Quintanilla and Suzette Quintanilla. In the 1980s, she was often criticized and refused bookings at venues across Texas for performing Tejano music—a male-dominated music genre. However, her popularity grew after she won the Tejano Music Award for Female Vocalist of the Year in 1987, which she won nine consecutive times. She signed with EMI Latin in 1989 and released her self-titled debut album the same year, while her brother became her principal music producer and songwriter.

Selena released Entre a Mi Mundo (1992), which peaked at number one on the US Billboard Regional Mexican Albums chart for eight consecutive months. The album's commercial success led music critics to call it the "breakthrough" recording of her musical career. One of its singles, "Como la Flor", became one of her most popular signature songs. Live! (1993) won Best Mexican/American Album at the 1994 Grammy Awards, becoming the first recording by a female Tejano artist to do so. In 1994, she released Amor Prohibido, which became one of the best-selling Latin albums in the United States. It was critically acclaimed as being responsible for Tejano music's first marketable era as it became one of the most popular Latin music subgenres at the time.

Selena was shot and killed on March 31, 1995, by Yolanda Saldívar, her friend and former manager of her Selena Etc. boutiques. Saldívar was subsequently convicted of murder and sentenced to life in prison with possible parole after 30 years. Two weeks after Selena's murder, Texas governor George W. Bush declared April 16 as Selena Day in Texas. Her posthumous crossover album, Dreaming of You (1995), debuted atop the Billboard 200, making Selena the first Latin artist to accomplish this feat. In 1997, Warner Bros. released Selena, a film about her life and career, which starred a then-unknown Jennifer Lopez as Selena, catapulting Lopez into fame. In 2020, Netflix released Selena: The Series starring Christian Serratos. Selena has sold around 18 million records worldwide, making her one of the best-selling female artists in Latin music.

== Life and career ==
=== 1971–1988: Early life and career beginnings ===
Selena Quintanilla was born on April 16, 1971, at Freeport Community Hospital in Lake Jackson, Texas, a suburb of Houston. She was the youngest child of Abraham Quintanilla Jr., a Mexican-American former musician, and Marcella Ofelia Quintanilla (née Samora), who was Mexican-American with some Cherokee ancestry. The obstetrician at her birth was future congressman Ron Paul. Selena was raised as a Jehovah's Witness. Quintanilla Jr. noticed her musical abilities when she was six years old. He told People magazine, "Her timing, her pitch were perfect, I could see it from day one." In 1980, Quintanilla Jr. opened his first Tex-Mex restaurant in Lake Jackson, Papa Gayo's, where Selena and her siblings A.B. (on bass guitar) and Suzette (on drums) would often perform. The following year, the restaurant was forced to close due to a recession caused by the 1980s oil glut. The family declared bankruptcy and was evicted from their home. They then settled in Corpus Christi, Texas; Quintanilla Jr. became manager of the newly formed band Selena y Los Dinos and began promoting it to support the family. The name Los Dinos came from the band Quintanilla Jr. was a part of in the 1970s. They played on street corners, at weddings, quinceañeras, and fairs.

As her popularity as a singer grew, the demands of Selena's performance and travel schedule began to interfere with her education. Her father took her out of school when she was in the eighth grade. Her teacher Marilyn Greer disapproved of Selena's musical career. She threatened to report Quintanilla Jr. to the Texas Board of Education, believing the conditions to which Selena was exposed were inappropriate for a girl her age. Quintanilla Jr. told Greer to "mind her business". Other teachers expressed their concerns when they noticed how tired Selena appeared when she arrived at school. At seventeen, Selena earned a high school diploma from the American School of Correspondence in Chicago and was also accepted at Louisiana State University. She enrolled at Pacific Western University, taking up business administration as her major subject.

Quintanilla Jr. refurbished an old bus which he named "Big Bertha" and the band used it as their tour bus. In the first years of touring, the family sang for food and barely had enough money to pay for gasoline. In 1984, Selena recorded her first LP record, Selena y Los Dinos, for Freddie Records. Despite wanting to record English-language songs, Selena recorded Tejano music compositions—a male-dominated, Spanish-language genre with German influences of polka, jazz, and country music, popularized by Mexicans living in the United States.

Quintanilla Jr. believed that Selena should record musical compositions related to her heritage. During the recording sessions for the album, Selena had to learn Spanish phonetically with guidance from her father. In 1985, to promote the album, Selena appeared on the Johnny Canales Show, a popular Spanish-language radio program, on which she continued to appear for several years. Selena was discovered by musician Rudy Trevino, founder of the Tejano Music Awards, where she won the Female Vocalist of the Year award in 1987 and for nine consecutive years after.

The band was often turned down by Texas music venues because of the members' ages and because Selena was their lead singer. Her father was often told by promoters that Selena would never be successful because she was a woman in a genre historically dominated by men. By 1988, Selena had released five more LP records; Alpha (1986), Muñequito de Trapo (1987), And the Winner Is... (1987), Preciosa (1988), and Dulce Amor (1988).

=== 1989–1991: Selena, Ven Conmigo, and relationship with Chris Pérez ===
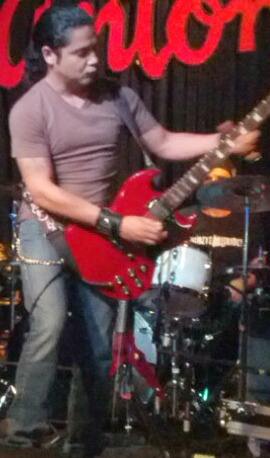
Chris Pérez (pictured in 2012) and Selena began a relationship, despite her father's disapproval

José Behar of newly formed label EMI Latin Records, together with the new head of Sony Music Latin, watched Selena perform at the 1989 Tejano Music Awards. Behar was searching for new Latin acts and wanted to sign Selena to EMI's label Capitol Records, while Sony Music Latin offered Quintanilla Jr. twice Capitol's signing fee. Behar thought he had discovered the "next Gloria Estefan" but his superior called Behar illogical because he had been in South Texas less than a week. Quintanilla Jr. chose EMI Latin's offer because of the potential for a crossover album and wanted his children to be the first musicians to sign to the label.

Before Selena began recording for her debut album, Behar and Stephen Finfer requested a crossover album for her. She recorded three English-language compositions for the heads of EMI's pop division. Behar and Finfer's request for a crossover album was denied and Selena was told she needed a bigger fan base to sell such an album. Behar thought EMI Records and the public did not believe that a Mexican American woman could have "crossover potential" after Charles Koppelman denied the project.

Selena released her self-titled debut album on October 17, 1989. The singer recorded most of the songs at AMEN Studios in San Antonio, Texas; "Sukiyaki" and "My Love" were recorded at Sunrise Studios in Houston. Selena wrote "My Love" and wanted the song to be included on the album. Her brother A.B., became Selena's principal record producer and songwriter for most of her musical career, though did not write the tracks "Sukiyaki", "Contigo Quiero Estar", and "No Te Vayas". "Sukiyaki" was originally recorded in Japanese in the 1960s by Kyu Sakamoto; Selena used a translation into Spanish of an English version of the song by Janice Marie Johnson. Selena peaked at number seven on the US Billboard Regional Mexican Albums chart, becoming Selena's first recording to debut on a national music chart. The album performed better than other recordings from other contemporaneous female Tejano singers.

In the same year, Coca-Cola wanted Selena to become one of their spokespeople in Texas. The jingle used in her first two commercials for the company was composed by A.B. and Chris Pérez—the latter of whom had joined Selena y Los Dinos several months earlier as the band's new guitarist. Pérez began having romantic feelings for Selena, despite having a girlfriend in San Antonio. After a trip down to Mexico with the band, Pérez thought it would be best for them both to distance themselves, but he found that impossible and chose to try to build a relationship with her. They expressed their feelings for each other at a Pizza Hut restaurant and shortly afterward became a couple. Pérez and Selena hid their relationship, fearing Quintanilla Jr. would try to break it up.

Selena released her second studio album, Ven Conmigo, in September 1990. Three tracks from Ven Conmigo were released as singles; "Ya Ves", "La Tracalera", and "Baila Esta Cumbia". The latter, a Tejano cumbia song, became one of Selena's most successful singles. Its popularity grew in Mexico, where a compilation album bearing the single's name was released there, which was certified platinum by the Asociación Mexicana de Productores de Fonogramas y Videogramas (AMPROFON), denoting sales of 150,000 units.

A registered nurse and fan named Yolanda Saldívar asked Quintanilla Jr. permission to start a fan club in San Antonio. Saldívar had the idea after attending one of Selena's concerts. Quintanilla Jr. approved Saldívar's request; he believed the fan club would bring more exposure for the band. Saldívar soon became a close friend to Selena and the family, opening the fan club in 1991 and fulfilling the role of president. That same year, Salvadoran singer Álvaro Torres composed a duet he wanted to record with Selena. The song, "Buenos Amigos", was produced by Enrique Elizondo and was released on Torres' tenth studio album Nada Se Compara Contigo (1991).

"Buenos Amigos" peaked at number one on the US Billboard Top Latin Songs chart, giving Selena her first number-one single. The song's music video earned Selena and Torres two nominations at the 1992 Billboard Music Awards. The track was also nominated for Duo of the Year at the 1992 Tejano Music Awards. Biographer Deborah Parédez wrote that the track enabled Selena to tour the west and east coasts of the United States. According to John Lannert of Billboard magazine, "Buenos Amigos" was helped by increased airplay on regional Mexican and Tejano radio stations, which had previously dismissed Selena's recordings.

=== 1992–1993: Elopement, Entre a Mi Mundo, and Selena Live ===
Selena's sister Suzette claimed to have caught Selena and Pérez flirting with each other and immediately informed their father. (Note: According to Pérez in that book, Suzette freaked out when she got on Big Bertha, the band's tour bus, seeing him and Selena together, but they actually never flirted with each other when they were on the bus alone before Suzette's bare arrival.) Quintanilla Jr. took Pérez off the bus and told him his relationship with Selena was over. Selena and Pérez continued their relationship despite Quintanilla Jr's disapproval; Selena's mother Marcella approved of their relationship. Quintanilla Jr. saw Selena and Pérez romantically together on the bus after he informed them of his disapproval; he pulled over and an argument between him and Selena ensued. He called Pérez a "cancer in my family" and threatened to disband the group if they continued their relationship.

Selena and Pérez relented; Quintanilla Jr. fired Pérez from the band and prevented Selena from leaving with him. After his dismissal, Pérez and Selena secretly continued their relationship. On the morning of April 2, 1992, Selena and Pérez decided to elope, believing Quintanilla Jr. would never approve of their relationship. Selena thought her father would have to accept them if they were married and would not have to hide their feelings for each other. Within hours of their marriage, the media announced the couple's elopement.

Selena's family tried to find her; Quintanilla Jr. did not take the news well and alienated himself for some time. Selena and Pérez moved into an apartment in Corpus Christi. In interviews, Quintanilla Jr. expressed how he feared Pérez could be a machista (Spanish for a male chauvinist), who would force Selena to end her career and music goals, a move that prevented Quintanilla Jr. to accept Pérez as being suitable for Selena at the time. Quintanilla Jr. later approached Pérez, apologized, accepted the marriage, and took Pérez back into the band.

A month after her elopement, Selena released her third studio album, Entre a Mi Mundo, in May 1992. The album was critically acclaimed as her "breakthrough album". The record peaked at number one on the US Billboard Regional Mexican Albums chart for eight consecutive months; it was certified 10× platinum by the RIAA for sales of 600,000 album-equivalent units, while in Mexico, the album sold 385,000 units. Entre a Mi Mundo became the first Tejano album by a female artist to sell over 300,000 copies. (Note: According to a book written by Stacy Lee, she reported sales of 300,000 units, while María Celeste Arrarás wrote in her book that the album sold 385,000 units in Mexico.)

Selena was booked for a high-profile border press tour in Monterrey, Mexico, with music media figures in a meet-and-greet conference. At the time, Tejanos were looked down on as "hayseed pochos" among Mexican citizens. The singer's Spanish was far from fluent; EMI Latin executives were "terrified" about the singer's limited Spanish during the press conference for the album in Mexico. According to Patoski, Selena "played her cards right" during the conference and won over the Mexican media after newspapers hailed her as "an artist of the people". The newspapers found her to be a refreshing change from Mexican telenovela actors "who were fair-skinned, blond-haired, and green-eyed."

After her publicity press, Selena was booked to play at several concerts throughout Mexico, including a performance at Festival Acapulco in May 1993, which garnered her critical acclaim. Her performance in Nuevo León on September 17, 1993, was attended by 70,000 people, garnering her the title of the biggest Tejano act in Mexico. The album produced four singles; "Como la Flor", "¿Qué Creías?", "La Carcacha", and "Amame". "Como la Flor" became Selena's signature recording; it was critically acclaimed by music critics as a career launcher for Selena.

"Como la Flor" helped Selena to dominate the Latin music charts and become immensely popular in Mexico—where Mexican-Americans were generally not liked among citizens—and was well received by critics. The track was nominated for Song of the Year at the 1993 Tejano Music Awards. The single peaked at number six on the US Billboard Top Latin Songs chart. In 1994, Entre a Mi Mundo ranked as the second best-selling regional Mexican album of all-time.

Selena released Live! a year after Entre a Mi Mundo; it was recorded during a free concert at the Memorial Coliseum in Corpus Christi, on February 7, 1993. The album included previously released tracks that were sung live and three studio recordings; "No Debes Jugar", "La Llamada", and "Tú Robaste Mi Corazón"—a duet with Tejano musician Emilio Navaira. The tracks "No Debes Jugar" and "La Llamada" peaked within the top five on the US Billboard Top Latin Songs chart. Live! won the Grammy Award for Best Mexican/American Album at the 36th Grammy Awards.

In May 1994, Live! was named Album of the Year by the Billboard Latin Music Awards. At the 1994 Tejano Music Awards, Live! won Album of the Year, while at the 1994 Lo Nuestro Awards, it was nominated for Regional Mexican Album of the Year. Live! was certified gold by the RIAA for shipments of 500,000 copies, while in Mexico it sold 250,000 units. Selena briefly appeared opposite Erik Estrada in a Mexican telenovela titled Dos Mujeres, Un Camino. In 1995 she entered negotiations to star in another telenovela produced by Emilio Larrosa. She appeared in two episodes, which garnered record ratings for the series.

=== 1994–1995: Fashion venture, film debut, and Amor Prohibido ===
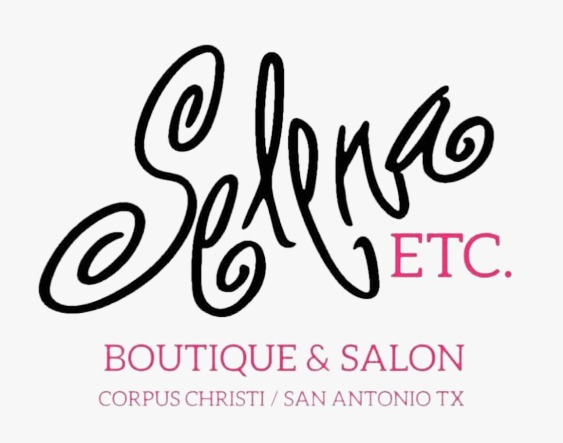
The logo used by Selena for her boutiques

Aside from music, in 1994 Selena began designing and manufacturing a line of clothing; she opened two boutiques called Selena Etc., one in Corpus Christi and the other in San Antonio. Both were equipped with in-house beauty salons. By the end of 1994, Selena Etc. had held two fashion shows to showcase their clothing line. Selena (alongside her band, Selena y Los Dinos) held a concert after Selena Etc.'s second fashion show on December 3, 1994, at the Hemisfair Arena in San Antonio. She was in negotiations to open more stores in Monterrey, Mexico, and Puerto Rico. Saldívar managed both boutiques after the Quintanilla family were impressed with the way she managed the fan club.

Hispanic Business magazine reported that the singer earned over five million dollars from these boutiques. She was ranked among the twentieth-wealthiest Hispanic musicians who grossed the highest income in 1993 and 1994. Selena released her fourth studio album, Amor Prohibido, in March 1994. The recording debuted at number three on the US Billboard Top Latin Albums chart and number one on the US Billboard Regional Mexican Albums charts. After peaking at number one on the Top Latin Albums, the album remained in the top five for the rest of the year and into early 1995.

Amor Prohibido became the second Tejano album to reach year-end sales of 500,000 copies, which had previously only been accomplished by La Mafia. It became one of the best-selling Latin albums in the United States. Amor Prohibido spawned four number-one singles; the title track, "Bidi Bidi Bom Bom", "No Me Queda Más", and "Fotos y Recuerdos". (Note: "Fotos y Recuerdos" peaked at number one posthumously in April 1995. "Amor Prohibido", "Bidi Bidi Bom Bom", and "No Me Queda Mas" peaked at number one before Selena's death.) Amor Prohibido was among the best selling U.S. albums of 1995, and has been certified 36× platinum by the RIAA for sales of 2.16 million album-equivalent units in the United States. The album was named on Tom Moon's list of the 1,000 Recordings to Hear Before You Die: A Listener's Life List (2008).

Amor Prohibido popularized Tejano music among a younger and wider audience than at any other time in the genre's history. The two singles, "Amor Prohibido" and "No Me Queda Más", were the most successful US Latin singles of 1994 and 1995, respectively. The album's commercial success led to a Grammy nomination for Best Mexican/American Album at the 37th Grammy Awards in 1995. It won Record of the Year at the 1995 Tejano Music Awards and Regional/Mexican Album of the Year at the 1995 Lo Nuestro Awards. Selena was named "one of Latin music's most successful touring acts" during her Amor Prohibido tour.

After Amor Prohibido's release, Selena was considered "bigger than Tejano itself", and broke barriers in the Latin music world. She was called the "Queen of Tejano Music" by many media outlets. (Note: Outlets describing Selena as "Queen of Tejano Music" include: Entertainment Weekly, Billboard magazine, Los Angeles Magazine, Vibe magazine, The Huffington Post, and The New York Times.) Billboard magazine ranked Amor Prohibido among the most essential Latin recordings of the past 50 years and included it on its list of the top 100 albums of all-time. In 2017, NPR ranked Amor Prohibido at number 19 on their list of the 150 greatest albums made by women. Sales of the album and its titular single represented Tejano music's first commercial success in Puerto Rico. Selena recorded a duet titled "Donde Quiera Que Estés" with the Barrio Boyzz, which was released on their album of the same name in 1994. The song reached number one on the Top Latin Songs chart, which enabled Selena to tour in New York City, Argentina, Puerto Rico, the Dominican Republic, and Central America, where she was not well known.

In late 1994, EMI chairman Charles Koppelman decided Selena had achieved her goals in the Spanish-speaking market. He wanted to promote her as an English-language solo pop artist. Selena continued touring while EMI began preparing the crossover album, engaging Grammy Award-winning composers. By the time Selena performed to a record-breaking, sold-out concert at the Houston Astrodome in February 1995, work had already begun on her crossover album. In 1995, she made a cameo appearance in Don Juan DeMarco, which starred Marlon Brando, Johnny Depp, and Faye Dunaway.

== Murder ==
The Quintanilla family appointed Yolanda Saldívar as manager of Selena's boutiques in early 1994. Eight months later, Selena signed Saldívar as her registered agent in San Antonio, Texas. After the agreement, Saldívar moved from San Antonio to Corpus Christi to be closer to Selena. In December 1994, the boutiques began to suffer after the number of staff for both stores had decreased. According to staff members, Saldívar often dismissed employees she disliked. Employees at the stores regularly complained about Saldívar's behavior to Selena, who dismissed the claims, believing Saldívar would not negatively impose erratic decisions on Selena's fashion venture.

According to Quintanilla Jr., the staff later turned their attention to him and began informing him about Saldívar's behavior. Quintanilla Jr. took the claims seriously; he told Selena to "be careful" and said Saldívar might not be a good influence. Selena dismissed her father's inquiries because he had often distrusted people in the past. By January 1995, Selena's fashion designer Martin Gomez, her cousin Debra Ramirez, and clients had expressed their concerns over Saldívar's behavior and management skills. During an interview with Saldívar in 1995, reporters from The Dallas Morning News said her devotion to Selena bordered on obsession.

According to Quintanilla Jr., in January 1995, he began receiving telephone calls from fans who said they had paid for membership in the Selena fan club and had received nothing in return for it, prompting him to launch an investigation. Quintanilla Jr. discovered that Saldívar had embezzled more than $30,000 via forged checks from both the fan club and the boutiques. Quintanilla Jr. held a meeting with Selena and Suzette on the night of March 9 at Q-Productions to confront Saldívar. Quintanilla Jr. presented Saldívar with the inconsistencies about the disappeared funds. Quintanilla Jr. told her that if she did not provide evidence that disproved his accusations, he would involve the local police. Quintanilla Jr. banned Saldívar from having any contact with Selena. However, Selena did not want to dissolve their friendship, as she thought Saldívar was essential to the success of the clothing line in Mexico. Selena also wanted to keep her close because she had bank records, statements, and financial records necessary for tax preparation.

In the days before Selena's death, Saldívar delayed handing over the bank statements and financial records by saying she had been physically and sexually assaulted in Mexico. Saldívar, along with Selena, appeared at a medical clinic on March 31, 1995, ostensibly to have Saldívar examined for an assault which she claimed happened to her in Monterrey. (Note: Testimony given by nurse Carla Anthony at the Saldívar trial indicated that Saldívar and Selena's visit to her clinic occurred March 24, not March 31. The predominance of other sources indicate that Nurse Anthony is mistaken.) During that visit, Saldívar was given a brief physical examination by the clinic's doctor, but this did not include a gynecological exam specifically done in cases of sexual assault. Nurse Carla Anthony suggested that Saldívar needed to have the rape exam in San Antonio for three reasons: Saldívar was a resident of San Antonio, the clinic they were currently at was in Corpus Christi, and the assault occurred in Mexico.

Afterward, Selena again met with Saldívar in her motel room at the Days Inn in Corpus Christi. At the motel, Selena demanded the financial papers. At 11:48 a.m., Saldívar got a gun from her purse and pointed it at Selena. As Selena attempted to flee, Saldívar shot her once on the right lower shoulder, severing the subclavian artery and causing a severe loss of blood. Critically wounded, Selena ran towards the lobby, leaving a 392-foot (119 m) trail of blood. She collapsed on the floor as the clerk called the emergency services, with Saldívar still chasing after her and calling her a "bitch". Before collapsing, Selena named Saldívar as her assailant and gave the number of the room where she had been shot. Meanwhile, Saldívar attempted to leave in her pickup truck. She was spotted by a responding police cruiser. She surrendered after a nearly nine-and-a-half-hour standoff with police and the FBI. By that time, hundreds of fans had gathered at the scene. Many wept as police took Saldívar away.

Selena was taken to the Corpus Christi Memorial Hospital at 12:00 p.m.. Her pupils were fixed and dilated, there was no evidence of neurological function, she had no vital signs, and was declared clinically brain dead. Dr. Louis Elkins, cardiac surgeon, arrived at Memorial Hospital and said he saw doctors making "heroic efforts" to revive Selena. They were able to establish an "erratic heartbeat" long enough to transfer her to the trauma room, and began blood transfusions in an attempt to re-establish blood circulation after opening Selena's chest and finding massive internal bleeding. By the time Elkins arrived, an emergency doctor began "massaging her heart" after it had stopped beating. Elkins reported how all efforts were futile and said had he been the receiving doctor, he would not have made any treatments on Selena. He felt "obligated to continue" after the emergency room doctor made the decision to reanimate the singer. After 50 minutes of surgery, she was pronounced dead from blood loss and cardiac arrest at 1:05 p.m (CST); she was 23 years old.

An autopsy was performed on the same day due to the overwhelming media response. It revealed that the bullet had entered Selena's upper right back, near her shoulder blade, passed through her chest cavity, severed the right subclavian artery, and exited her right upper chest. Her official cause of death was described as "exsanguinating internal and external hemorrhage due to perforating gunshot wound" resulting in "massive bleeding". The internal examination revealed that she had not ingested any type of drug, nor was she pregnant, which was a rumor that began spreading after her death.

=== Funeral ===
On April 1, Bayfront Plaza in Corpus Christi held a vigil which drew 3,000 fans. During the event, it was announced that a public viewing of the casket would be held at the Bayfront Auditorium the following day. Fans lined up for almost one mile (1.6 km). An hour before the doors opened, rumors that the casket was empty began circulating, which prompted the Quintanilla family to have an open-casket viewing. About 30,000 to 40,000 fans passed by Selena's casket. More than 78,000 signed a book of condolence. Flowers for the casket viewing were imported from The Netherlands. At the request of Selena's family, video and flash photography was banned.

On April 3, 1995, six hundred guests—mostly family members—attended Selena's burial at Seaside Memorial Park in Corpus Christi, Texas, which was broadcast live by a Corpus Christi and San Antonio radio station without the consent of her family. A Jehovah's Witness minister from Lake Jackson preached in English, quoting Paul the Apostle's words in 1 Corinthians 15. Hundreds of people began circling the area in their vehicles. Among the celebrities who attended Selena's funeral were Roberto Pulido, Bobby Pulido, David Lee Garza, Navaira, Laura Canales, Elsa Garcia, La Mafia, Ram Herrera, Imagen Latina, and Pete Astudillo. A special Mass held the same day at Los Angeles Sports Arena drew a crowd of 4,000. Coincidentally, Selena's funeral occurred on the same day as a workplace shooting (which also occurred in Corpus Christi) that resulted in the deaths of 5 people (excluding the perpetrator); news of the incident was not covered much since it was overshadowed by news coverage of the funeral.

=== Impact ===
Selena's murder had a widespread impact. Reactions to her death were compared to those following the deaths of musicians John Lennon and Elvis Presley and that of U.S. president John F. Kennedy. Major television networks interrupted their regular programming to break the news—Tom Brokaw referred to Selena as "The Mexican Madonna". Her death was front-page news in The New York Times for two days. Many vigils and memorials were held in her honor, and radio stations in Texas played her music non-stop. Her funeral drew 60,000 mourners, many of whom traveled from outside the United States.

The news struck the Hispanic community extremely hard. Many fans traveled thousands of miles to see Selena's house and boutiques, and the crime scene. By mid-afternoon, police were asked to form a detour because a line of cars began backing up traffic from the Quintanillas' houses. Among the celebrities who contacted the Quintanilla family to express their condolences were Gloria Estefan, Celia Cruz, Julio Iglesias, and Madonna. Other celebrities—including Stefani Montiel, Jaime DeAnda (of Los Chamacos), and Shelly Lares—appeared on radio stations to express their thoughts about Selena's death.

An issue of People magazine was released several days after her murder. Its publishers believed interest would soon wane. They released a commemorative issue within a week when it became clear it was growing. The issue sold nearly a million copies, selling the entire first and second print runs within two weeks. It became a collector's item, a first in the history of People. Betty Cortina, an editor of People, told Biography they never had an issue that was completely sold out; "it was unheard of". In the following months, the company released People en Español aimed at the Hispanic market, due to the success of the Selena issue. This was followed by Newsweek en Español and Latina magazine.

A few days later, Howard Stern mocked Selena's murder and burial, poked fun at her mourners, and criticized her music. Stern said, "This music does absolutely nothing for me. Alvin and the Chipmunks have more soul ... Spanish people have the worst taste in music. They have no depth." Stern's comments outraged and infuriated the Hispanic community in Texas. Stern's sound effects man added gunshots to her music played in the background on his show. A South Texas judge issued a disorderly conduct arrest warrant in Stern's name, claiming "I did it for all the Tejano fans". Free-speech advocates said the warrant was unconstitutional. "It fails the First Amendment test", said Jay Jacobson, executive director for the Texas chapter of the American Civil Liberties Union. "It's a speech that is protected – being a music critic, no matter how harsh, is not grounds for criminal charges." Stern made an on-air statement, in Spanish, saying his comments were not made to cause "more anguish to her family, friends and those who loved her". The League of United Latin American Citizens boycotted Stern's show, finding his apology unacceptable.

Texas retailers removed any products that were related to Stern, while Sears and McDonald's sent a letter stating their disapproval of Stern's comments to the media because some fans believed the companies sponsored Stern's show. Within a week, on NBC's The Tonight Show with Jay Leno, Stern and Robin Quivers (his co-host) were asked whether Stern's remarks about Selena were acceptable. Quivers decided not to talk about the situation to avoid arguing with Stern. When Linda Ronstadt—a pop singer of Mexican-American heritage—appeared on the show, she and Quivers argued when Ronstadt defended Selena.

On April 12, 1995, two weeks after Selena's death, George W. Bush, governor of Texas at the time, declared her birthday, April 16, Selena Day in the state. He said Selena represented "the essence of south Texas culture." Some European Americans in Texas wrote to the editor of the Brazosport Facts during April and May, asking what the big deal was; some were offended that Selena Day fell on Easter. Others said, "Easter is more important than Selena Day", and that they believed people should let Selena rest in peace and continue with their lives. Mexican Americans in Texas wrote vociferously to the newspaper. Some said others were too critical of Selena Day, and should not have responded so rudely.

In October 1995, a Houston jury convicted Saldívar of first-degree murder and she was sentenced to life in prison with the possibility of parole after 30 years in 2025. On March 27, 2025, Saldívar's appeal for parole was denied. She will be eligible again in March 2030. Life with the possibility of parole was the maximum prison term allowed in Texas that could be imposed at the time. In 2002, under a judge's order, the gun used to kill Selena was destroyed and the pieces were thrown into Corpus Christi Bay. Fans and historians disapproved of the decision to destroy the gun, saying the event was historical and the gun should have been in a museum.

== Artistry ==
Selena possessed a soprano vocal range. During her lifetime, she expressed her love and admiration for Gloria Estefan, who she credited with opening the door for female artists of Hispanic descent. Selena's other major influences include Madonna, Rocío Dúrcal, Paula Abdul, Michael Jackson, Janet Jackson, Mariah Carey and Whitney Houston, as well as rock bands such as AC/DC and Kiss.

In an April 1995 interview with Billboard magazine, Behar said he saw Selena as a "cross between Janet Jackson and Whitney Houston in style, feel, and vocal range". Although Selena did not write most of her songs, she incorporated R&B, Latin pop, technopop, country and western, and disco into her Tejano music repertoire. Mario Tarradell of The Dallas Morning News said that during her music career, Selena "merges Tejano's infectious cumbia rhythm with street-savvy R&B, old-school soul, dancehall reggae, sizzling salsa, and trippy, loopy funk". Selena's recordings expressed "love and pain, as well as strength and passion", according to Charles Tatum.

She also recorded independently driven, female-empowerment-themed compositions; "Si La Quieres", "¿Qué Creías?", "Ya Ves" and "Ya No", which centered around inappropriate relationships and recovery from domestic violence. Peter Watrous of The New York Times said Selena's voice "sometimes quivered", and that she "roughed it up a bit". He continued, "[a]t its best, it had a coolness, a type of unadorned passion". Ilan Stavans called her music "cursi-melodramatic, cheesy, overemotional, not too far from Juan Gabriel and a relative of Iglesias". Richard Corliss of Time magazine said her songs "are perky, cheerful rather than soulful", and that earlier recordings, "with their tinny, Tijuana Brass charts, and keyboards that evoke calliopes are ideal for the fairground or merry-go-round". Corliss calls Selena's singing an "expert mimicry of everything from Édith Piaf's melodramatic contralto to the coloratura riffs of Mariah Carey. But the sounds are still lightly Hispanic."

"Dreaming of You" (1995)
"Dreaming of You", an English-language recording, became one of four English cuts Selena recorded for her crossover from Spanish into English pop music.

Newsweek magazine called Selena's English-language recordings "a blend of urban pop and Latin warmth". According to Texas Monthly, Selena's brother modernized her music into a more "funk and hip hop" sound. Selena's use of emotive range during her musical career has been praised by critics as being her trademark. A.B. wrote increasingly cumbia-influenced songs for Ven Conmigo (1990); Ramiro Burr of Billboard said Selena and her band had "evolved a rhythmic style that demonstrated its increasing prowess for catchy cumbias such as 'Baila Esta Cumbia' and the title track". Italian essayist Gaetano Prampolini wrote that "Selena's voice projected a sonorous warmth and joyfulness" during his review of Selena's cumbia recordings. In his review of the remix album Enamorada de Ti (2012), Stephen Thomas Erlewine of AllMusic wrote that Selena's songs were "rooted in the '90s and sound that way".

== Public image ==
Quintanilla Jr. sought to maintain Selena's image clean and family-oriented. In 1989, she was offered sponsorship from beer companies but her father turned them down. Selena was often refused gigs at Tejano venues because she was a female singer in a male-dominated music scene. Manuel Peña wrote that after 1989, Selena's popularity increased and she became a sex icon following the release of her debut album. Charles Tatum said Selena drew most attention from her "beauty, sexuality, and youthful impact on the Tejano music scene".

Selena said she never wanted to record explicit songs due to her upbringing and because her fan base consisted largely of young children, who regarded her as a role model. She further commented on the question of her sexual appeal to men during her crossover attempt, asserting that she will "stay the same" and that her English-language recordings will refrain from foul language and sexual themes. In 1997, María Celeste Arrarás wrote in her book about Selena's death that the singer was a "sweet and charismatic girl". According to Arrarás, Selena "trusted everyone"; she often went shopping alone, despite her father's concerns over her safety.

Betty Cortina of People magazine said Selena's provocative choice of clothing was an acceptable emulation of Janet Jackson and Madonna, and that she wore "sexy outfits that [accentuated] a body of a Latina woman". Cortina also stated that Selena had a "flamboyant style, an unbelievable body, curves and booty". Arrarás wrote that Selena "began wearing clothes designed to emphasize her curvaceous figure" and that she "never came across as cheap—simply sexy". She also said Selena's makeup regimen was not being "painted up or vulgar". Arrarás also noted Selena's "fun-loving stage manner" and said she was "playful onstage and off".

Matt S. Meier wrote in his book The Mexican American Experience: An Encyclopedia (2010) that Selena exhibited "contagious energy" during her concerts and said she displayed "warmth, passion, and sexuality" while exuding a "down-to-earth persona of the wholesome young girl next door". Selena wore outfits that accented her physical attributes and was not afraid to wear outfits she liked, despite criticism from parents who thought Selena's choice of outfits were inappropriate for young girls, who began emulating Selena. Her views on public image in the fashion industry were bothersome; she said she was opposed to the image that all woman should be "rail-thin" and the notion that they must wear certain outfits and be "super-young to be beautiful".

In the early 1990s, Selena began wearing decorative bustiers, spandex or tight pants, and attractive, unbuttoned jackets during her concerts. She was inspired by Paula Abdul, Janet Jackson, and Madonna. During a 1992 interview, Selena said her choice of clothing does not reflect her personality. NBC News called Selena's outfit "provocative". Because of her choices of outfits and dance moves, she was named by her fans as the "Mexican Madonna". According to Suzette, Selena often designed and sewed her outfits backstage with her designers, moments before she was due on stage. Quintanilla Jr. disapproved of Selena's outfits, but he later accepted it when Selena discussed it being a fashion trend.

Selena became an inactive member of the Jehovah's Witnesses due to her exotic clothing. During the photo shoot for Entre a Mi Mundo (1992), a photographer remarked on the ways Selena's choice of clothing affected Quintanilla Jr. tremendously; he often left sessions when Selena appeared in revealing outfits. Selena was credited as the first woman to change public perceptions of feminine beauty in the Tejano market; a feminist, she blazed a trail for other female artists during her career.

Following Selena's death, some celebrities questioned her status as a role model among Hispanic women. In her 1999 documentary about the singer, filmmaker Lourdes Portillo expressed concerns whether Selena was a great role model for young women. Portillo believed Selena was sending the wrong message to young girls by dancing in clothing that suggested hypersexualization. American author Sandra Cisneros agreed with Portillo's assessment that Selena was "not a good role model to Latina women". Media outlets also shared Portillo's views; they said the "fairy tale story" of Selena was one that her family would want to preserve, questioning Quintanilla Jr.'s role for pushing an image that Selena had "never made mistakes" into the media, calling it "lies" and "not the real story".

== Philanthropy ==
During her childhood, Selena helped organizations such as Toys for Tots. She was active in the U.S. Latino community, visiting local schools to talk to students about the importance of education. At Fulmore Junior High School in Austin, she educated two hundred high school students about positive attitudes and setting life-goals in their adult lives. Selena urged children to stay in school, and that alcohol and drugs will lead them nowhere in life. She spent her free time helping her community. Selena performed in Washington, D.C. to celebrate the forming of the Congressional Hispanic Caucus. Following the aftermath of Hurricane Andrew, Selena helped victims in Florida by performing at a Houston benefit concert.

In August 1994, Selena hosted a charity baseball game to raise money for unspecified charities. She also donated her time to civic organizations such as D.A.R.E. and planned a fundraising concert to help AIDS patients. Selena participated with the Texas Prevention Partnership which was sponsored by the Texas Commission on Alcohol and Drug Abuse (Dep Corporation), which released an educational video that was sent to students for free. Her pro-education videos included "My Music" and "Selena Agrees". She was in the works for a Dallas-Fort Worth, Texas Boys & Girls Clubs of America benefit concert.

In January 1995, Selena headlined the Teach the Children festival in San Antonio. The concert funded a non-profit program to provide school supplies to needy children. Selena was a spokesperson for women in abusive relationships. She also helped out at homeless shelters. According to the A&E television series Biography, Selena's fans were often minorities; she encouraged them to make the most of their lives.

== Legacy ==
Selena has been credited for helping redefine Latin music and its subgenres of Tejano, cumbia, and Latin pop. Selena broke barriers in the Latin music world. She is considered "one of the most significant Mexican-American singers of the end of the twentieth century". People magazine named Selena one of the most intriguing people of the 20th century. US Senator Kay Bailey Hutchison named Selena one of "the spirited women who shaped [the United States]."

Selena became one of the "most celebrated cultural products" of the United States-Mexico borderlands. Selena was called the "Queen of Tejano Music", and was described as "the most important and popular Tejano star of all time". Her death was "the most devastating loss" in Tejano music history, according to Zach Quaintance of The Monitor. At the time of her death, Selena became one of the most widely known Mexican-American vocal artists and the most popular Latin artist in the United States. She had a "cult-like" following among Hispanics.

Selena has been named one of the most influential Latin artists of all-time and has been credited for elevating a music genre into the mainstream market. Latin Post called the singer "one of the most iconic artists in Latin American music history", while The New York Times called her "arguably the most important Latina musician in the country, on her way to becoming one of the most important, period." Selena became a household name in the United States and Mexico following her death and became part of the American pop culture. She became more popular in death than when she was alive.

After her death, her popularity among the Hispanic population was compared to those of Marilyn Monroe and Madonna in Anglo-American culture. According to author Carlota Caulfield, Selena was "one of the most popular Latina singers of the 1990s". Selena's popularity was drawn in by the LGBT community and minority groups in the United States. The popularity of Tejano music waned after her death and has not recovered. John Lannert of Billboard said in an interview with Biography in 2007 that when Selena died the "Tejano market died with her".

Dreaming of You, the crossover album Selena had been working on at the time of her death, was released in July 1995. It sold 175,000 copies on the day of its release in the U.S.—a then-record for a female vocalist—and sold 331,000 copies its first week. Selena became the third female artist to sell over 300,000 units in one week, after Janet Jackson and Mariah Carey. It debuted at number one on the U.S. Billboard 200 chart, becoming the first album by a Hispanic artist to do so. Dreaming of You helped Selena to become the first solo artist to debut a posthumous album at number one. Dreaming of You joined five of Selena's studio albums on the Billboard 200 chart simultaneously, making Selena the first female artist in Billboard history to do so. The album was certified 59× platinum (Latin field), for sales of 3.54 million album-equivalent units in the U.S. alone.

As of 2017 it has sold over 2.942 million copies in the U.S. making it the best-selling Latin album of all-time in the country according to Nielsen SoundScan. As of 2015, the recording has sold five million copies worldwide. In 2008, Joey Guerra of the Houston Chronicle said its lead single, "I Could Fall in Love", had "made the Tejano goddess a posthumous crossover star". Her death was believed to have sparked an interest in Latin music by people who were unaware of its existence. It was also believed her death "open[ed] the doors" to other Latin musicians such as Jennifer Lopez, Ricky Martin, and Shakira.

In 1995, the United States Social Security Administration ranked the name Selena one of the 100 most popular names for newborn girls, and namesake Selena Gomez acknowledged Quintanilla's influence. In December 1999, Selena was named the "top Latin artist of the '90s" and "Best selling Latin artist of the decade" by Billboard for her fourteen top-ten singles in the Top Latin Songs chart, including seven number-one hits. She was the best-selling Latin female singer of the 1990s in the U.S. and Mexico. Selena was named "Best Female Vocalist of the '80s" and "Best Female Vocalist of the '90s" at the 2010 Tejano Music Awards. In 2023, Rolling Stone ranked Selena at number 89 on its list of the 200 Greatest Singers of All Time.

=== Posthumous film, streaming video and honors ===
In the months following her death, several honors and tributes were erected. Several proposals were made, such as renaming streets, public parks, food products, and auditoriums. Two months later, a tribute was held at the 1995 Lo Nuestro Awards. The Spirit of Hope Award was created in Selena's honor in 1996; it was awarded to Latin artists who participated in humanitarian and civic causes. On March 16, 2011, the United States Postal Service released a "Latin Legends" memorial stamp to honor Selena, Carlos Gardel, Tito Puente, Celia Cruz, and Carmen Miranda. In February 2014, the Albany, New York Times Union named her one of "100 Coolest Americans in History". In 1998 Selena was commemorated with a museum.

In 1995, Selena was inducted into the Billboard Latin Music Hall of Fame, the Hard Rock Cafe's Hall of Fame, and the South Texas Music Hall of Fame. In 2001 she was inducted into the Tejano Music Hall of Fame. In 2017, she received a star on the Hollywood Walk of Fame. The unveiling ceremony of her star was attended by around 4,500 fans, which was the largest-ever crowd for an unveiling ceremony at the Hollywood Walk of Fame. She was named one of the 20 most influential Texans of all time by author Laurie Jasinski. She was ranked fifth of the "100 most influential Latin musicians of the 20th century" according to the Orange County Register. The singer has been given many epithets by media outlets, including the "Queen of Cumbia" or "Queen of Kumbia", (Note: Queen of Cumbia is also spelled as Queen of Kumbia. Cumbia is the correct spelling of the music genre while Kumbia is the stylization used and popularized by her brother A.B. Quintanilla III, the King of Cumbia or King of Kumbia, and this spelling stylization has also been applied for Selena Quintanilla.) the "Chicana Elvis", the "Queen of Hybrid Pop Culture", the "Hispanic Marilyn Monroe", the "Tupac Shakur of Latin Music", the "Corpus Christi Queen", and the "People's Princess". Media have compared Selena's fashion sense to that of Madonna more times than any other celebrity.

In 1995, Mexican actress Salma Hayek was chosen to portray Selena in a biopic produced by the Quintanilla family and Warner Bros. However, Hayek turned down the role as she felt it was "too early" to base a film on Selena, and that it would be emotional since Selena's death was still being covered on American television. Over 21,000 people auditioned for the title role, becoming the second largest audition since the search for Scarlett O'Hara in Gone with the Wind (1939). Puerto Rican-American actress Jennifer Lopez replaced Hayek, which initially drew criticism because of Lopez's Puerto Rican ancestry, but after seeing her performance, fans changed their views. Gregory Nava directed the film, which was released on March 21, 1997. Selena opened in 1,850 theaters worldwide and grossed $11,615,722, making it the second-highest-grossing film debut that week. With a production budget of $20 million, the film grossed $35 million in the U.S. The film was a commercial and critical success and is often cited by critics as Lopez's breakthrough role. Lopez rose into pop culture, for which the film's success was credited.

In 1999, a Broadway-bound musical titled Selena was scheduled to premiere in San Antonio in March 2000 to commemorate the fifth anniversary of her murder. Broadway producers Tom Quinn, Jerry Frankel, Peter Fitzgerald, and Michael Vega staged the musical, and Edward Gallardo wrote the show's book and lyrics. Fernando Rivas composed the show's songs. In 2000, Selena Forever was first produced; the show embarked on a 30-city U.S. tour with a budget of over US$2 million. After a national casting call, producers chose Veronica Vasquez to portray Selena; Vasquez alternated in the role with Rebecca Valdez. The musical previewed on March 21, and opened on March 23 at the San Antonio Municipal Auditorium.

Selena's family and her former band, Los Dinos, held a tribute concert on April 7, 2005, a week after the 10th anniversary of her murder. The concert, titled Selena ¡VIVE!, was broadcast live on Univision and achieved a 35.9 household rating. It was the highest-rated and most-viewed Spanish-language television special in the history of American television. The special was also the number-one program in any language among adults ages 18 to 34 in Los Angeles, Chicago, and San Francisco; it tied for first in New York, beating that night's episode of Fox's reality show American Idol. Among Hispanic viewers, Selena ¡VIVE! outperformed Super Bowl XLV and the telenovela Soy tu dueña during the "most-watched NFL season ever among Hispanics".

In January 2015, it was announced that a two-day annual event called Fiesta de la Flor would be held in Corpus Christi for Selena by the Corpus Christi Visitors Bureau. Musical acts for the first annual event included Kumbia All Starz, Chris Pérez, Los Lobos, Jay Perez, Little Joe y la Familia, Los Palominos, Stefani Montiel of Las 3 Divas, Girl in a Coma's Nina Diaz, Las Fenix, and The Voice contestant Clarissa Serna. The event raised $13 million with an attendance of 52,000 people, 72% of whom lived outside of Corpus Christi. The event sparked interest from people in 35 states and five different countries including Mexico, Brazil, and Ecuador.

On August 30, 2016, a wax statue of Selena was unveiled at Madame Tussauds Hollywood. In October 2016, MAC Cosmetics released a limited edition Selena makeup line after On Air with Ryan Seacrest senior producer Patty Rodriguez started a petition for the company to do so and it garnering over 37,000 signatures. It became the best-selling celebrity line in cosmetic history. She was inducted into the Texas Women's Hall of Fame at Texas Woman's University in October 2016. An exhibit at the National Museum of American History in Washington, D.C. that ran in 2017, focused on Selena's influence in marketing. "Due to her massive appeal to both general and Latino markets, advertisers began targeting specific demographics for the first time."

Google honored Selena on October 17, 2017, with a musical doodle of her life. On December 11, 2018, it was announced that a biographical television series based on Selena's life titled Selena: The Series would be released on Netflix in December 2020. Actress Christian Serratos plays the leading role as Selena, which was shown in a teaser trailer in late 2019. The two-part series is being done with the participation of the Quintanilla family. Selena: The Series is an American biographical drama streaming television series created by Moisés Zamora and starring Christian Serratos. The first part of the series was released on Netflix on December 4, 2020. The second and final part premiered on May 4, 2021.

Forever 21 announced the launch of a clothing line celebrating her legacy named "Selena: The White Rose Collection", was released in 2019. In a 10-part podcast miniseries, Anything for Selena, broadcast in 2021 by WBUR-FM and Futuro Media, Latina journalist Maria Garcia "goes on an intimate, revelatory quest to understand how Selena has become a potent symbol for tensions around race, class and body politics in the United States". In the same year, Selena was posthumously presented with the Grammy Lifetime Achievement Award which her family received on the artist's behalf.

Selena was posthumously awarded a 2023 National Medal of Arts, which was accepted by her sister in a ceremony held in October 2024.

In 2025, Netflix announced Selena y Los Dinos, a documentary about the singer, her band, and their rise to stardom.

== Tours ==
Selena Live! Tour (1993–1994)

Date (1993)	City	Country	Venue
February 7	Corpus Christi	United States	Memorial Coliseum
February 28	Houston	United States	Houston Astrodome
March 23	San Antonio	United States	Coliseum Ballroom
Date (1994)	City	Country	Venue
February 27	Houston	United States	Houston Astrodome
October 12	Monterrey	Mexico	Teatro del Pueblo

Amor Prohibido Tour (1994–1995)

Date (1994)	City	Country	Venue
January 10	Denver	United States	Unknown
February 3	Austin	United States	Escape Club
February 12	Post Falls	United States	Greyhound Park
February 23	San Salvador	El Salvador	Gimnasio Nacional José Adolfo Pineda
February 27	Houston	United States	Houston Rodeo & Livestock Show (Houston Astrodome)
March 5	Miami	United States	Noche de Carnaval 94
March 12	San Antonio	United States	Randy's Nightclub
March 13	San Antonio	United States	Alomodome
March 19	Fort Worth	United States	Guys & Dolls Club
March 20	Belton	United States	Bell County Expo Center
March 31	Fort Worth	United States	Tejano Rodeo Club
April 8	Houston	United States	Arabian Shrine Temple
April 9	Houston	United States	Club Zazz
April 10	Poteet	United States	Strawberry Festival Grounds
April 15	Toledo	United States	Unknown
April 16	Chicago	United States	Aragon Ballroom
April 24	San Antonio	United States	Hemisfair Park
May 4	Houston	United States	Club Zazz
May 5	Victoria	United States	Sun Valley Ranch Saloon & Dance Hall
May 6	San Marcos	United States	Hays County Civic Center
May 7	Houston	United States	Guadalupe Park
May 8	Mercedes	United States	Rio Grande Valley Livestock Show
May 22	Acapulco	Mexico	Festival Acapulco 94
May 23	Acapulco	Mexico	Festival Acapulco 94
May 29	San Antonio	United States	Rosedale Park
June 1	Houston	United States	El Dorado Ranch Nightclub
June 4	Arlington	United States	Music Mill Amphitheater
June 17	Corpus Christi	United States	Texas T Nightclub
June 22	San Antonio	United States	Tejano Rose Nightclub
July 3	San Antonio	United States	Lakeland Air Force Base Pavillion
July 29	Beeville	United States	El Dorado
July 31	Houston	United States	AstroWorld's Southern Star Amphitheater
August 4	Acapulco	Mexico	Acapulco Fest
August 6	El Paso	United States	El Paso County Coliseum
August 8	Roswell	United States	Royal Crown Convention Hall
August 25	Los Angeles	United States	Universal Amphitheater
August 27	Fresno	United States	Selland Arena
September 2	Pueblo Colorado	United States	Colorado State Fair
September 4	Corpus Christi	United States	Bayfront Convention Center
September 14	Washington D.C.	United States	D.C. Armory
September 15	Boston	United States	Royale Boston
September 16	New York City	United States	Jacob K. Javitz Convention Center
September 21	Monterrey	Mexico	Palacio Sultán
September 30	Guatemala City	Guatemala	Plaza Camino Real
October 1	Guatemala City	Guatemala	Plaza de Torros
Unknown Dates		Ecuador	Unknown
		Chile	
		Argentina	
October 10	Guadalajara	Mexico	Benito Juárez Auditorium
October 23	Dallas	United States	Texas State Fair
October 28	Austin	United States	Escape Club
November 10	Houston	United States	International Ballroom
November 13	Atlanta	United States	Unknown
November 17	Apodaca	Mexico	Rodeo de Medianoche
November 18	Tijuana	Mexico	Rodeo de Santa Fe
November 25	Laredo	United States	Laredo Civic Center
November 26	Dallas	United States	Dallas Convention Center
November 28	Amarillo	United States	Rex Baxter Building
December 1	San Benito	United States	The New Road House
December 2	San Antonio	United States	Hemisfair Arena
December 11	San Diego	United States	San Diego Convention Center
December 18	Ciudad Madero	Mexico	Centro de Convenciones
December 22	Monterrey	Mexico	Far West Rodeo
December 23	Monterrey	Mexico	Far West Rodeo
December 31	Houston	United States	George R. Brown Convention Center
Date (1995)	City	Country	Venue
January 1	Laredo	United States	Laredo Civic Center
February 3	McAllen		Villa Real Convention Center
February 9	Orlando		Disney World's Pleasure Island
February 10	Immokalee		Cielito Lindo Dance Hall
February 12	Lakeland		Lakeland Civic Center
February 16	Dallas		Tejano Rodeo West End
February 17	Austin		Escape Club
February 18	Tampa		Florida State Fair
February 24	San Diego		EMI Latin Festival
February 26	Houston		Houston Astrodome
March 4	Miami		Orange Bowl
March 11	Chicago		International Amphitheater
March 12	Miami		Calle Ocho
March 15	Houston		El Dorado
March 17	San Antonio		Tejano Rose Nightclub
March 18	Fort Worth		Guys & Dolls Nightclub
March 19	Bryant		Denim & Diamond Nightclub

=== Monuments ===
Mirador de la Flor (English: Lookout of the Flower) is Selena's own life-size bronze statue monument in Corpus Christi, Texas, sculpted by H. W. "Buddy" Tatum and unveiled in 1997. About 30,000 people from around the world visit this monument every year. While the monument has remained a popular tourist attraction, the construction of the statue met some resistance from the local community. Dusty Durrill, a local philanthropist, financed the construction of the monument with support from local community leaders.

== Discography ==
Selena y Los Dinos albums

- Selena y Los Dinos (1984)
- Alpha (1986)
- Muñequito de Trapo (1986)
- And the Winner Is... (1987)
- Preciosa (1988)
- Dulce Amor (1988)

Solo studio albums

- Selena (1989)
- Ven Conmigo (1990)
- Entre a Mi Mundo (1992)
- Amor Prohibido (1994)
- Dreaming of You (1995)

== Filmography ==
Film and television
Year	Title	Role	Notes
1993	Dos mujeres, un camino	Herself	2 episodes
1995	Sábado gigante	Herself	Guest
1995	Latin Nights	Herself	TV documentary
1995	Don Juan DeMarco	Mariachi singer	Minor role/cameo appearance (posthumous release)

=== Biographical programming ===
Year	Title	Notes
1997	Selena Remembered	Documentary
1997	The Final Notes	Documentary
1998	Behind The Music	Episode: "Selena"
2005	Selena ¡VIVE!	Dedicatee
2007	Queen of Tejano Music	Documentary
2008	Biography	Episode: "Selena"
2020	Selena: The Series	Biographical drama
2025	Selena y Los Dinos	Documentary

True crime documentaries

Year	Title	Notes
1996	E! True Hollywood Story	Episode: "The Selena Murder Trial"
1998	American Justice	Episode: "Selena Murder of a Star"
2001	The Greatest	Episode: "100 Most Shocking Moments in Rock and Roll History"
2003	101	Episode: "101 Most Shocking Moments in Entertainment"
2010	Famous Crime Scene	Episode: "Selena"
2012	100 Most Shocking Music Moments	Documentary
2012	Reel Crime/Reel Story	Episode: "Selena"
2014	Snapped	Episode: "Selena Death of a Superstar"

== See also ==
- Honorific nicknames in popular music
- List of best-selling Latin music artists
- List of Hispanic and Latino Americans
- List of people on the postage stamps of the United States
- Music of Texas
- Women in Latin music
