= Selena y Los Dinos =

American Tejano band

- Selena & Los Dinos in 1987

Background information
- Origin: Lake Jackson, Texas, U.S.
- Genres: Tejano, pop, traditional rock
- Years active: 1981–1995; Reunions: 2005, 2010, 2015
- Labels: Freddie (1981–1984); Cara (1985); GP (1986–1989); EMI Latin (1989–1995)
- Past members: Selena Quintanilla; Abraham Quintanilla III; Suzette Quintanilla; Rena Dearman; Rodney Pyeatt; Mike Dean; Dale Balint; Ricky Vela; Joe Ojeda; Pete Astudillo; Mike Orosco; Chris Pérez; Don Shelton; Freddy Correa; Jesse Ibarra; Roger Garcia; Henry Gomez

Selena y Los Dinos (English: Selena and the Dinos) was an American Tejano band formed in 1981 by Tejano singer Selena and her father Abraham Quintanilla. The band remained together until the murder of Selena in 1995, which caused the dissolution of the band in the same year. When Selena was signed with EMI Latin, EMI president José Behar told Selena that "the world wanted Selena, not Selena y Los Dinos." Selena then began releasing her solo studio albums under her name and her own logo title Selena instead of Selena y Los Dinos. Before Selena was signed with EMI, the band had sold more than 80,000 copies in the state of Texas.

== Band history ==
=== Beginning (1956–1981) ===
Between 1956 and 1971, Selena's father, Abraham Quintanilla, played with Los Dinos. He loved to play music and persuaded Selena to play music. Although she initially complained she did not want to, she later found that she actually loved to play. Selena herself joined the family band at the age of ten, and they turned professional two years later. Selena not only sang in some concerts that her father arranged, but she also sang in school whenever she asked. Selena's father discovered her amazing voice. He formed a family band around her with his two older children: Abraham III (A.B.), was put on the bass guitar, and Suzette, was put on drums. The family first showcased their band on street corners, at quinceañeras, and at other family gatherings until Selena's father opened up a Mexican restaurant in Lake Jackson, Texas called Papagayos (English: Parrots) in 1979. While her parents took care of the restaurant, Selena performed for the first time in public at the age of nine with her older siblings to entertain the diners. However, the restaurant began to lose its customers when the recession of 1981 hit South Texas, and the restaurant was forced into foreclosure. Soon after the restaurant's closure, Selena's family moved their musical aspirations to Corpus Christi, Texas. There, Selena began to gain popularity and respect as a child singer.

Within a year, the family's restaurant went bankrupt and the family was forced to move in with relatives, as Abraham had quit his job to manage the restaurant full-time. The band then performed wherever they could, including weddings, street corners, fairs, Events, and Quinceañeras. At some places, the band began to gain a lot of appreciation, while at other performances, where Mexican Americans were not accepted, it was booed. On one occasion while performing at a wedding, the band was booed and then food was thrown on stage.

=== Mainstream success (1981–1988) ===
In 1981, Corpus Christi, Texas-based Freddie Records signed Selena y Los Dinos to a recording contract. By 1981, the label began promoting the yet-to-be-released debut album by selling singles from tracks off the album in local stores. Selena y Los Dinos began to perform more frequently in local Texas clubs and fairs as their name began to spread around Texas. In 1984, Freddie released the band's very first full-length album entitled Selena y Los Dinos. When the album was completed, the president and owner of Freddie Records told Abraham that his band, Selena y Los Dinos, were not professionally ready to record and release a full-length album. Undeterred, Abraham dropped the record deal with Freddie Records and walked out. While still under the record deal, Selena's father came upon another small local Texas record company called Cara Records. The rumored album The New Girl in Town was never sold in stores, but singles from Cara Records were sold separately and promotionally around the state of Texas. On this album is the song Encontré El Amor that was sold as a promotional single in 1983. In 1987, GP Productions, which discovered Selena y Los Dinos performing, signed the group for a yearly record contract. Selena y Los Dinos were in the recording studio soon after the agreement. That same year, Selena y Los Dinos recorded their second full-length album Alpha (A in the Greek alphabet), which was the first album to be released without legal actions or threats.

In 1987, '[Muñequito de Trapo]' (Rag Doll) was released and an increase in sales began to spread the news about the band, which was promoted and showcased in the Tejano Music Awards. Selena won best "Female Vocalist of The Year", which she then won eight consecutive times. The band as well received and won awards separately. In 1987, Abraham Quintanilla Jr., who was proud of the band's winnings and awards, released And the Winner Is... and made Selena sing more Tejano and Mexican songs which followed their roots in order to gain more recognition in the Tejano world. In 1988, Selena y Los Dinos released Preciosa (Precious), a nickname that was given to Selena as a child, which sold 20,000 units in Texas alone. No other record or single sales were ever documented outside the United States. By 1988, Selena's albums began to sell 20,000 units apiece. Selena y Los Dinos' last independent studio album was released in 1988 under the title Dulce Amor (Sweet Love). The album helped Selena to be noticed during the 1989 Tejano Music Awards by José Behar, who had just opened the Latin division of EMI Records; EMI Latin. Jose Behar recalled seeing Selena perform and the whole place "blew up" from so much excitement and enthusiasm emanating from the charismatic Selena. Soon after her performance, Behar signed Selena as a solo artist. Selena began releasing her albums with her new logo titled after her name, while the band Los Dinos was still beside Selena in concerts.

=== Chris Pérez (1988–1995) ===
Selena's brother A.B. met Chris Pérez while touring in the Tejano scene in Texas. Chris was the guitar player for Tejano artist Shelly Lares and the two became friends. Selena's guitarist Jesse Ybarra, who appeared and recorded with the band from 1986-1988, left the band to be a part of Pete Astudillo's solo band. Pérez was interviewed and auditioned at Abraham Quintanilla's house. A.B., who had told Chris to come, was confronted by his father, who did not like the energy and image of Chris Pérez, who had his own rock band and performed entirely in the English language. A.B. insisted that Pérez would learn the music quickly, convincing him to hire Pérez as the new lead guitarist. Pérez's addition to the band proved to be more than anticipated. He and Selena fell in love, but her father, who wanted to keep the band's clean-cut image, only saw envy in Pérez. He confronted Pérez and Selena and told them that the relationship had to end or the band would break up. Pérez was fired, while Selena stayed with the band. However, they secretly married on April 2, 1992, and Selena added Perez's last name to hers. She tried to hide the marriage from the rest of the family, but the news quickly spread to radio stations and newscasts. The senior Quintanilla later accepted Pérez into the family and allowed him to re-join the band. Soon after Selena's murder in March 1995, Pérez left to form the Chris Pérez Band. He dedicated a song to his late wife, calling it "The Best I Can". The band broke up in 2002, and he joined Selena's brother A.B. in his bands, the Kumbia Kings in 2002 and the Kumbia All Starz in 2006. A.B. is now honoring Selena by using her name in his songs.

=== The Reunion: Selena ¡Vive! (2005) ===
The surviving band members reunited for an historic massive tribute concert in honor of Selena on April 7, 2005. The concert, Selena ¡VIVE!, was held at the Reliant Stadium in Houston, Texas.The event not only sold out but became the highest-rated and most-viewed Spanish-language TV special ever. In attendance were Gloria Estefan, Kumbia Kings, and an introduction by Jennifer Lopez, who portrayed Selena in the film made about her life. Suzette Quintanilla, Selena's sister, the former drum player for Selena y Los Dinos, announced that the band Los Dinos was reuniting to record a new song for A.B. Quintanilla's group Kumbia All Starz with surprise guest recording artists on the album La Vida de un Genio in 2010.

== Band members ==
- Selena Quintanilla – lead vocals (died 1995)
- Chris Pérez – lead and rhythm guitars (1989–1991, 1992–1995)
- Ricky Vela – keyboards (1984–1995)
- Joe Ojeda – keyboards (1983–1984)
- A.B. Quintanilla – bass, backing vocals
- Suzette Quintanilla – drums, percussion, backing vocals
- Arturo Meza – percussion, congas
- Dale Balint – lead and rhythm guitars (1984–1985)
- Roger Garcia – lead and rhythm guitars (1986–1989)
- Pete Astudillo – backing and co-lead vocals
- Don Shelton – backing vocals (died 2014)
- Freddy Correa – backing vocals
- Rena Dearman – keyboards (1981–1983)
- Ricky Landeros – percussion
- Jesse Ibarra – lead and rhythm guitars (1985–1986)
- Henry Gomez – lead and rhythm guitars (1987–1995)

== Discography ==
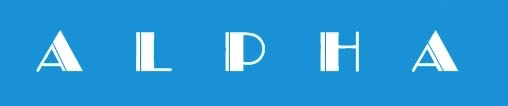
Alpha (1986) album logo

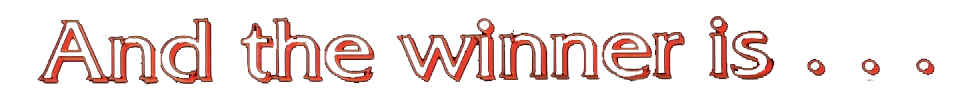
And the Winner Is... (1987) album logo

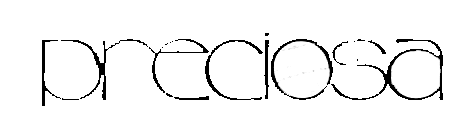
Preciosa (1988) album logo

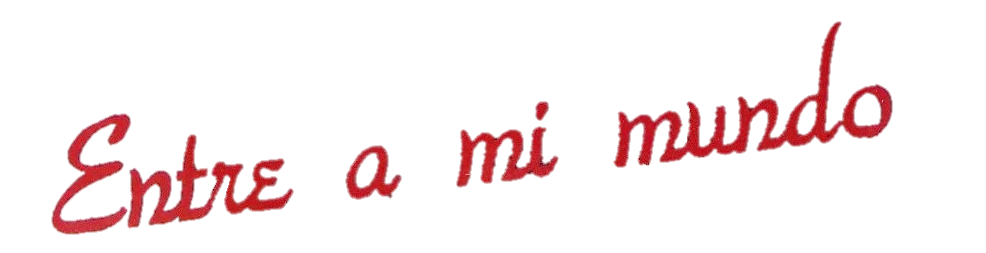
Entre a Mi Mundo (1992) album logo

Selena y Los Dinos albums

- Selena y Los Dinos (1984)
- Alpha (1986)
- Muñequito de Trapo (1986)
- And the Winner Is... (1987)
- Preciosa (1988)
- Dulce Amor (1988)

Selena solo albums

- Selena (1989)
- Ven Conmigo (1990)
- Entre a Mi Mundo (1992)
- Selena Live! (1993)
- Amor Prohibido (1994)
- Dreaming of You (1995)

== See also ==
- Murder of Selena
