= All My Hits: Todos Mis Éxitos Vol. 2 =

Greatest hits album by Selena
- Released: February 29, 2000
- Recorded: 1986–1995
- Genres: Pop, cumbia, Mariachi
- Length: 58:14
- Languages: English, Spanish
- Label: EMI Latin
- Producers: A. B. Quintanilla; Abraham Quintanilla

Selena chronology
All My Hits: Todos Mis Éxitos (1999)	All My Hits: Todos Mis Éxitos Vol. 2 (2000)	Live! The Last Concert (2001)

Singles from All My Hits: Todos Mis Éxitos Vol. 2
- 1. "Cien Años" Released: February 29, 2000

All My Hits: Todos Mis Éxitos Vol. 2 is a greatest hits album by American singer Selena. It was released on February 29, 2000, by EMI Latin. After Selena's murder in 1995, her father and manager Abraham Quintanilla stated his commitment to preserving her music, and EMI Latin pledged ongoing support for her releases. In 1999, the label's president José Behar acknowledged Selena, who remained the label's top-selling artist, for her contributions to establishing EMI Latin as "the house that Selena built". In March 1999, to commemorate the label's tenth anniversary, it released All My Hits: Todos Mis Éxitos; it achieved commercial success, and the label announced a sequel. All My Hits: Todos Mis Éxitos Vol. 2 contains 16 songs ranging from tracks featured on Selena's Muñequito de Trapo (1987) to the posthumous 1997 club remix of "Enamorada de Ti" (1990).

Music critics praised the compilation for highlighting Selena's versatility and adaptability, while others criticized its material. The album peaked at number one on the United States Billboard Top Latin Albums and Regional Mexican Albums charts, and reached number 149 on the Billboard 200. The compilation ended the year as the second-best-selling Regional Mexican Album and ranked at number 13 on the Top Latin Albums year-end chart. All My Hits: Todos Mis Éxitos Vol. 2 garnered the nomination for Best Greatest Hits Album of the Year at the 2001 Billboard Latin Music Awards and Favorite Latino Album at the sixth Blockbuster Entertainment Awards. In 2003, the Recording Industry Association of America (RIAA) certified it double Platinum (Latin), denoting 200,000 shipments in the US.

== Background ==
On March 31, 1995, American Tejano music singer Selena was shot and killed by Yolanda Saldívar, her friend and former manager of the singer's boutiques. At the time of her death, Selena was developing a crossover album that was intended to launch her into the American pop market. The crossover album Dreaming of You was posthumously released on July 18, 1995, debuting and peaking atop the United States Billboard 200 albums chart, an unprecedented feat for a predominantly Spanish-language recording in the chart's history. Tejano music—which she had thrust into the mainstream market—experienced a decline in popularity in the wake of her death, and Tejano albums that didn't bear Selena's name was struggling to sell. Following her death, Abraham Quintanilla, Selena's father and manager, stated his commitment to preserving Selena's music. Selena's brother A. B. Quintanilla, who produced her music, said Selena expressed a wish for her presence to "never go away". In the years since Selena's death, her family has faced censure from fans and the media, who have accused them of exploiting the singer and capitalizing on her murder by commodifying her repertoire.

In 1999, Selena remained EMI Latin's top-selling artist, surpassing the sales of living musicians. From 1995 to 1999, according to Nielsen SoundScan, Selena was the label's most-commercially-successful performer. EMI Latin's president José Behar recognized her contributions that made EMI Latin "the house that Selena built". Concurring on Selena's impact on EMI Latin, industry executives attributed the label's rise to the top of the US Latin music market to her influence. In March 1999, to commemorate the label's tenth anniversary, it released All My Hits: Todos Mis Éxitos, which debuted atop the Top Latin Albums and Regional Mexican Albums charts, and peaked at number 54 on the Billboard 200 chart. Billboard named Selena the best-selling Latin artist of the 1990s decade, and on January 22, 2000, the label was due to release the second volume of All My Hits: Todos Mis Éxitos. Three weeks later, it announced All My Hits: Todos Mis Éxitos Vol. 2 would be released on February 29. Accompanying the album is a gold, heart-shaped, commemorative pendant bearing an image of Selena.

Behar compared Selena's projects and future album plans to those of a living artist. Despite her repertoire being emptied of unreleased material, (Note: "Puede Ser", featuring Nando "Guerro" Dominguez, the then-unreleased songs "Lo Dejo Solo", and "Feelings" were released on subsequent albums Momentos Intimos (2004), Classic Series Vol. I (2006), and Through the Years/A Traves de los Anos (2007), respectively. The unreleased demos "Oh No (I'll Never Fall in Love Again)" and "Are You Ready to be Loved?" were released in 2015 on an online radio station operated by Selena's family.) Behar emphasized the label's ongoing support of Selena's releases with significant investment. He said the public were oblivious to Selena's repertoire before her affiliation with EMI Latin, saying these recordings had the potential for creative reconfiguration. Behar also stated the label's main aim was to safeguard Selena's music and her influence in a manner similar to the eminence achieved by the Beatles, Elvis Presley, and the Beach Boys. According to Behar, All My Hits: Todos Mis Éxitos Vol. 2 is dedicated to Selena's fans, emphasizing the label's efforts to approach every aspect, from packaging to marketing, as though Selena were present.

== Music ==
All My Hits: Todos Mis Éxitos Vol. 2 contains 16 tracks that range from compositions present on Selena's album Muñequito de Trapo (1987) to the posthumously released 1997 club remix of "Enamorada de Ti" (1990). The label included songs that were popular on radio stations and those that had commercial success in retail outlets. The record open with the remix of "Enamorada de Ti", which has been transformed into a techno-dance track. The compilation's version of "No Quiero Saber" originates from the official Latin album for the 1996 Atlanta Olympics. While recording "Techno Cumbia" for Amor Prohibido (1994), A. B. encouraged Selena to rap with a New York accent that is evocative of Rosie Perez. The following track "A Million to One" was revitalized with the inclusion of saxophone, lending the song a "sensuous flavor" for the album Siempre Selena (1996).

The fifth song "Fotos y Recuerdos" samples the 1983 single "Back on the Chain Gang" by The Pretenders. Despite Chrissie Hynde's initial reluctance to release the song on Amor Prohibido, keyboardist Ricky Vela provided an English-language translation of the lyrics for Hynde's approval. Tarradell said the sixth track "Si Una Vez" embodies a more-traditional Tejano sound but also includes synthesizers and digital processing. The seventh track "No Me Queda Más" originates from Selena's live performance at the Houston Astrodome on February 26, 1995, during which Selena delivers an emotive rendition by infusing "tender moans and soulful wails". The following recording "Siempre Hace Frio" was originally intended for the soundtrack to the movie Don Juan DeMarco (1995) but was shelved by the film's music producers. The ninth track "El Chico del Apartamento 512" tells the tale of a romantic pursuit of "the guy in apartment 512". The following track, "Muñequito de Trapo", is one of Selena's earliest recordings to be included in the compilation. "Captive Heart", the subsequent track, was recorded weeks before Selena's death.

"Tú Robaste Mi Corazón", which was first recorded as a duet with Emilio Navaira, was re-recorded for Siempre Selena with Pete Astudillo; a former backup dancer and vocalist, and a member of Selena's band Los Dinos. "Bidi Bidi Bom Bom" also comes from the live Houston Astrodome concert; it features Selena's guitarist husband Chris Pérez's "skittering" guitar lines and Selena's adlibbing. The fourteenth track is a re-recording of "Aunque No Salga el Sol" that is included on Ven Conmigo (1990) and was initially recorded by Selena in 1983 for Bob Grever's label Cara Records. "Yo Fui Aquella" was originally recorded in ranchera but was rearranged as a sentimental ballad for Anthology (1998). The final track "Cien Años", featuring a revamped bolero arrangement, is drawn from the album Preciosa (1988).

== Critical reception ==
Professional ratings
Review scores
Source	Rating
The Encyclopedia of Popular Music	3/5 stars

Music critics gave All My Hits: Todos Mis Éxitos Vol. 2 a positive response and praised the compilation for highlighting Selena's versatility and adaptability. (Note: Praised for its versatility, and adaptability.) Writing for Newsday, Richard Torres said the compilation provides a suitable overview of Selena's work, while AllMusic said Selena's talents are discernible by those listening to the album and praised her streamlined transitions between pop and Latin music. The musical styles in the compilation were compared to the stylings of Julio Iglesias and Gloria Estefan's Miami Sound Machine. Scholar Ramiro Burr called it "another collection of hits" and Houston Chronicle's Joey Guerra said it is "another creative" compilation that offers pop and cumbia tracks. J. Carlos Villanueva of Total Musicales praised Selena's vocals and the quality of the compositions, and hailed it as a recording with a captivatingly rhythmic nature.

While some reviews questioned the inclusion of certain recordings, others found All My Hits: Todos Mis Éxitos Vol. 2 resonates with completists and hard-core fans, and noting casual listeners may discover a paucity of newer material. (Note: For completists, hard-core fans and casual interest.) Torres noted the exclusion of more-adventurous pieces such as Selena's collaboration with David Byrne on "God's Child (Baila Conmigo)" (1995) or her rendition of the West Side Story track "A Boy Like That" (1996). AllMusic approved of the additions of pop standards "A Million to One" and "Back on the Chain Gang" ("Fotos y Recuerdos"). El Norte's Victor Ronquillo, praised the inclusion of the Houston Astrodome recording of "Bidi Bidi Bom Bom" and praised "Cien Años" as a "beautiful song". According to El Siglo de Torreón, the compilation is replete with recordings that provided success for Selena. The Dallas Morning News's Mario Tarradell queried the inclusion of "Yo Fui Aquella" and "Muñequito de Trapo". According to Guerra, the compilation includes recordings sourced from Selena's early career in lieu of hit singles. Guerra named the remix of "Enamorada de Ti", and pop ballads "Munequito de Trapo" and "Aunque No Salga el Sol", as well as the live recordings, as highlights of the album; and Villanueva named "Techno Cumbia" and the live versions as key standouts.

== Commercial performance ==
EMI Latin's promoter John Ortiz said All My Hits: Todos Mis Éxitos Vol. 2 would have a limited availability of 90 days and was accompanied by the release of "Cien Años". Guerra said the inclusion of "Cien Años" would significantly contribute to the album's sales. All My Hits: Todos Mis Éxitos Vol. 2 was released on February 29, 2000, and sold 400,000 units in advanced copies. It debuted at number three on the US Billboard Top Latin Albums chart, selling 10,500 units in its initial week. The album trailed the debuts of Shakira's MTV Unplugged and Los Temerarios's En la Madrugada Se Fue. The compilation entered the US Billboard 200 at number 157 and the US Regional Mexican Albums chart at number two. Burr noted Selena's ability to secure the third position on the chart despite the lack of new material was a "phenomenal" feat. In its second week, La Jornada's Arturo Cruz Bárcenas noted the album's position at number four on the Top Latin Albums chart. During an interview with Burr, he highlighted Selena's influence on younger generations and the compilation's ascent on the charts as an affirmation of Latin artists' ability to achieve commercial success.

During the week commemorating Selena's death, the album peaked at number one on both the Top Latin Albums and Regional Mexican Albums charts, selling 8,000 units, which was consistent with the preceding week's sales figures. John Lannert of Billboard interpreted the plateaued sales during the singer's anniversary as an indication of the waning retail power of Selena's music. Lannert said All My Hits: Todos Mis Éxitos Vol. 2 is an indication of Selena's "legendary status" and her capacity to reach the number-one position even five years after her death. Reaching sales of 400,000 units by the end of March, All My Hits: Todos Mis Éxitos Vol. 2, along with recent releases from Shakira and Los Temerarios, contributed to a surge in Latin album sales in the United States during the month.

All My Hits: Todos Mis Éxitos Vol. 2 ranked at number 42 on Billboard's quarterly Top Latin Albums chart, which evaluated the highest-selling Latin albums from January through April 2000. In a mid-year recap, the album was listed in second place on the Regional Mexican Albums list. Based on Nielsen SoundScan music sales, All My Hits: Todos Mis Éxitos Vol. 2 was the 13th-best-selling Latin album by September 9, 2000. By the close of 2000, the album was the 13th-best-selling Top Latin Album and the second-most-successful Regional Mexican Album. The compilation was nominated for Best Greatest Hits Album of the Year at the 2001 Billboard Latin Music Awards and Favorite Latino Album at the sixth Blockbuster Entertainment Awards. In January 2003, the Recording Industry Association of America (RIAA) certified All My Hits: Todos Mis Éxitos Vol. 2 double Platinum (Latin), denoting 200,000 shipments in the United States.

== Track listing ==
Credits adapted from the liner notes of All My Hits: Todos Mis Éxitos Vol. 2 by EMI Latin.

No.	Title	Writer(s)	Length
1.	"Enamorada de Ti (Club Mix)" (1997; from the "Is It the Beat?" maxi single)	A. B. Quintanilla; Pete Astudillo	6:06
2.	"No Quiero Saber" (1996; rendition from Voces Unidas)	A. B.; Astudillo	3:34
3.	"Techno Cumbia" (1994; from the Amor Prohibido sessions)	A. B.; Astudillo	3:45
4.	"A Million to One" (1996; rendition from Siempre Selena)	Phil Medley	3:23
5.	"Fotos y Recuerdos" (1994; from the Amor Prohibido sessions)	Chrissie Hynde; Ricky Vela	2:35
6.	"Si Una Vez" (1994; from the Amor Prohibido sessions)	A. B.; Astudillo	2:45
7.	"No Me Queda Más (Live Version)" (1995; unreleased live performance at the Houston Astrodome)	Vela	3:51
8.	"Siempre Hace Frío" (1996; from Siempre Selena)	Cuco Sánchez	3:14
9.	"El Chico del Apartamento 512" (1994; from the Amor Prohibido sessions)	A. B.; Vela	3:27
10.	"Muñequito de Trapo" (1986; from the Muñequito de Trapo sessions)	Juan H. Barron	3:04
11.	"Captive Heart" (1995; from the Dreaming of You sessions)	Mark Goldenberg; Kit Hain	2:57
12.	"Tú Robaste Mi Corazón (featuring Pete Astudillo)" (1996; rendition from Siempre Selena)	A. B.	4:18
13.	"Bidi Bidi Bom Bom (Live Version)" (1995; unreleased live performance at the Houston Astrodome)	Selena Quintanilla–Pérez; A. B.; Astudillo	3:52
14.	"Aunque No Salga el Sol" (1990; from the Ven Conmigo sessions)	Johnny Herrera	4:20
15.	"Yo Fuí Aquella" (1998; rendition from Anthology)	A. B.	3:27
16.	"Cien Años" (vocals from Preciosa (1988) sessions)	Alberto Cervantes; Rubén Fuentes; Simon Gallup; Robert Smith; Laurence Tolhurst	3:36
Total length:			58:14

== Charts ==
=== Weekly charts ===
Weekly chart performance for All My Hits: Todos Mis Éxitos Vol. 2
Chart (2000)	Peak position
US Billboard 200 (Billboard)	149
US Top Latin Albums (Billboard)	1
US Regional Mexican Albums (Billboard)	1

=== Quarterly charts ===
Quarterly chart performance for All My Hits: Todos Mis Éxitos Vol. 2
Chart (2000)	Peak position
US Top Latin Albums (Billboard)	42

=== Year-end charts ===
Year-end chart performance for All My Hits: Todos Mis Éxitos Vol. 2
Chart (2000)	Peak position
US Top Latin Albums (Billboard)	13
US Regional Mexican Albums (Billboard)	2

== Certifications ==
Certification for All My Hits: Todos Mis Éxitos Vol. 2
Region	Certification	Certified units/sales
United States (RIAA)	2× Platinum (Latin)	400,000

== See also ==
- 2000 in Latin music
- Latin American music in the United States
- List of number-one Billboard Regional Mexican Albums of 2000
- List of number-one Billboard Top Latin Albums of 2000
- Women in Latin music

== Works cited ==
- "Selena - All My Hits: Todos Mis Exitos, Vol. 2 Album Review". AllMusic.
- "RIAA Gold & Platinum". Recording Industry Association of America.
- "1999: The Year in Music". Billboard. Vol. 111, no. 52. December 25, 1999.
- "Blockbuster Canada announces voting starts today for 'Sixth Annual Blockbuster Entertainment Awards'". Canada NewsWire. February 10, 2000. ProQuest 196403.
- "Selena Vigente Con Nuevo Disco". El Siglo de Torreón (in Spanish). April 3, 2000. Archived from the original on June 2, 2023 – via Elsiglodeterron.com.mx.
- Arrarás, María Celeste (1997). Selena's Secret: The Revealing Story Behind Her Tragic Death. Simon and Schuster. ISBN 0-684-83193-7.
- Bárcenas, Arturo Cruz (March 31, 2000). "A 5 años de su muerte, Selena aún es el american way of life de la música". La Jornada (in Spanish).
- Burr, Ramiro (February 13, 2000). "New album of hits to keep Selena in spotlight". San Antonio Express-News – via Newsbank.
- Burr, Ramiro (March 10, 2000). "More from Selena". San Antonio Express-News – via Newsbank.
- Burr, Ramiro (February 28, 2000). "One List: The Following CDs Are Due in Stores Tuesday". Houston Chronicle – via NewsBank.
- Cabrera, Rene (October 18, 1996). "Emilio%20Navaira"%20AND%20"Selena"&match=1 "Another Smash Selena CD Due Out". Corpus Christi Caller-Times – via Newspapers.com.
- Cobo, Leila (August 26, 2000). "Latin Music 6 Pack, Year-to-date". Billboard. Vol. 112, no. 35. p. 128 – via Google Books.
- Cobo, Leila (October 7, 2000). "On the Latin Charts". Billboard. Vol. 112, no. 41. p. 140 – via Google Books.
- Cobo, Leila (December 30, 2000). "2000, the Year in Music". Billboard. Vol. 112, no. 53. p. 208 – via Google Books.
- Cobo, Leila (February 17, 2001). "Nominations for the 2001 Billboard Latin Music Awards". Billboard. Vol. 113, no. 7. p. 88 – via Google Books.
- Cobo, Leila (March 31, 2007). "En Breve". Billboard. Vol. 119, no. 13.
- Cole, Patrick E.; Farley, Christopher John (July 10, 1995). "Old Rock, New Life". Time. Archived from the original on November 7, 2012.
- Corpus, Lorena (March 31, 2000). "Tras su muerte quintuplica ventas". El Norte (in Spanish). Gale A127369308.
- Corpus, Lorena (April 8, 2000). "Entrara en EU con 200 mil copias". El Norte (in Spanish). Gale A127371032.
- Esparaza, Elia (March–April 2000). "The Beautiful White Rose of Texas". Estylo. 4 (2).
- Falcon, Jaime-Paul (September 21, 2015). "Selena's Family Needs to Stop Tarnishing Her Legacy". Dallas Observer.
- Garcia, Ricky; Gamboa, Suzanne (March 15, 2022). "New digitally modified Selena music announcement gets mixed reviews online". KXAN-TV.
- Guerra, Joey (March 31, 2000). "Selena is Still a Fan Favorite". Houston Chronicle – via NewsBank.
- Guerra, Joey (March 26, 2000). "Selena's Music Over the Years". Houston Chronicle – via NewsBank.
- Guerra, Joey (March 27, 2000). "Her Complete Works". Houston Chronicle – via NewsBank.
- Guerra, Joey (July 21, 2020). "Still 'Dreaming' of Selena 25 years later". Houston Chronicle.
- Jasinski, Laurie E. (2012). Handbook of Texas Music. Texas A&M University Press. ISBN 978-0-87611-297-7.
- Lannert, John (March 23, 1996). "Latin Notas". Billboard. Vol. 108, no. 12 – via Google Books.
- Lannert, John (February 20, 1999). "Selena Set Marks EMI Latin's 10th Year". Billboard. Vol. 111, no. 8 – via Google Books.
- Lannert, John (March 27, 1999). "Latin Notas". Billboard. Vol. 111, no. 13 – via Google Books.
- Lannert, John (January 22, 2000). "Latin Notas". Billboard. Vol. 112, no. 4. Nielsen Business Media, Inc. p. 140 – via Google Books.
- Lannert, John (February 12, 2000). "Latin Notas". Billboard. Vol. 112, no. 7. p. 76 – via Google Books.
- Lannert, John (March 18, 2000). "Latin Notas". Billboard. Vol. 112, no. 12. p. 92 – via Google Books.
- Lannert, John (March 25, 2000). "Latin Notas". Billboard. Vol. 112, no. 13. p. 88 – via Google Books.
- Lannert, John (April 15, 2000). "Latin Notas". Billboard. Vol. 112, no. 16. p. 112 – via Google Books.
- Lannert, John (April 22, 2000). "Latin Notas". Billboard. Vol. 112, no. 17. p. 88 – via Google Books.
- Lannert, John (April 29, 2000). "Latin Music 6 Pack". Billboard. Vol. 112, no. 18. p. 156 – via Google Books.
- Marini, Richard A. (July 8, 2022). "Tejano star Shelly Lares is retiring — sort of". San Antonio Express-News.
- Martinez, Gerald (May 21, 2000). "From avant-pop to hiphop rap". New Straits Times. ProQuest 196403.
- Medina, John Henry (December 10, 2015). "Lost Selena track 'Are You Ready To Be Loved' uncovered". Tejano Nation.
- Mendoza, Madalyn (March 14, 2022). "Quintanilla family is releasing new Selena album nearly 30 years after the Tejano icon's death". Houston Chronicle.
- McLemore, David (April 2, 2000). "Selena's Hold Remains Strong". The Dallas Morning News – via Archives.Dallasnews.com.
- Patoski, Joe Nick (1996). Selena: Como La Flor. Boston: Little Brown and Company. ISBN 0-316-69378-2.
- Paul, Maria Luisa (March 15, 2022). "More 'Bidi Bidi Bom Bom' to come: Selena's father announces new album nearly 27 years after the singer's death". The Washington Post.
- Perone, James E. (2012). The Album: A Guide to Pop Music's Most Provocative, Influential, and Important Creations. ABC-CLIO. ISBN 978-0-313-37907-9.
- Perry, Claudia (January 10, 2017). "Selena turns in sultry, sensual performance at Dome". Houston Chronicle.
- Quintanilla, Selena (1990). Ven Conmigo (Media notes). A.B. Quintanilla (producer), Suzette Quintanilla (spoken liner notes producer). EMI Latin.
- Quintanilla, Selena (1994). Amor Prohibido (Media notes). A.B. Quintanilla (producer). EMI Latin. H4724382880349.
- Edward James Olmos (narrator), Jose Behar (executive producer), Abraham Quintanilla (executive producer), Claribel Cuevas (associate producer), Randal J. Edwards (associate producer), Ila von Hasperg (editor), Jeffrey Coulter (producer), Cecelia Miniucchi (director) (April 1, 1997). Selena Remembered (Documentary). Corpus Christi, Texas: EMI Latin Productions, Q-Productions.
- Quintanilla, Selena (1998). Anthology (Media notes). Abraham Quintanilla (written biography). EMI Latin. 7243494110.
- Quintanilla, Selena (2000). All My Hits: Todos Mis Exitos Vol. 2 (Media notes). A. B. Quintanilla (producer). EMI Latin. H272435233326.
- Quintanilla, Selena (2006). Classic Series, Vol. I (Media notes). A. B. Quintanilla (producer). Q-Productions.
- Ruiz, Paula (March 29, 2004). "Dara Selena hoy 'Momentos Intimos'". El Norte (in Spanish). Gale A114738230 – via Gale Research.
- Ronquillo, Victor (March 31, 2000). "Musicando/ Macy Gray:voz venida de la noche". El Norte (in Spanish). Gale A129421571.
- Schone, Mark (April 20, 1995). "A Postmortem Star in death, Selena is a crossover success". Newsday.
- Swift, Richard (2006). The Encyclopedia of Popular Music (7th ed.). Oxford University Press. ISBN 9780195313734.
- Stavans, Ilan; Augenbraum, Harold (2005). Encyclopedia Latina: History, Culture, And Society In The United States (4th ed.). Grolier Academic Reference. ISBN 0-7172-5815-7.
- Tarradell, Mario (June 29, 1994). "Album Reviews". The Miami Herald – via Newspapers.com.
- Taradell, Mario (November 7, 1996). "'Siempre Selena' A Musical Scrapbook". The Odessa American – via Newspapers.com.
- Tarradell, Mario (March 30, 2000). "Selena: Sound of a Decade". The Dallas Morning News – via Archives.Dallasnews.com.
- Torres, Richard (March 19, 2000). "An Installment of Selena's Legacy". Newsday – via Newspapers.com.
- Untiedt, Kenneth L. (2013). Cowboys, Cops, Killers, and Ghosts: Legends and Lore in Texas. University of North Texas Press. ISBN 978-1-57441-532-2.
- Valdes-Rodriguez, Alisa (April 9, 1999). "The Resonance of Selena". Los Angeles Times – via Newspapers.com.
- Verhovek, Sam Howe (April 1, 1995). "Grammy-Winning Singer Selena Killed in Shooting at Texas Motel". The New York Times. p. 1.
- Villanueva, J. Carlos (March 2000). "Play ¡¡¡Subele a Todo!!!". Total Musicales. "La mitice figura del Tex Mex Selena, reencarna en este compilado de exitos. La cadencia de su voz, la sensualidad en sus composiciones y la cachonderia de su personalidad son rescatadas en este album totalmente bailable y algunos remixes e interpretaciones en vivo. Las mejores: Techno Cumbia, No Me Queda Mas, Bidi Bidi Bom Bom."
- Guerra, Joey (March 26, 2000). "Selena's Legacy". Houston Chronicle Magazine.
