= Greatest Hits (Selena album) =

Greatest hits album by Selena
- Released: June 24, 2003 (US)
- Recorded: 1985–1995
- Genre: Tejano; Latin pop
- Length: 70:26
- Language: English
- Label: EMI
- Producer: Abraham Quintanilla III

Selena chronology
Ones (2002)	Greatest Hits (2003)	Momentos Intimos (2004)

Professional ratings
Review scores
Source	Rating
AllMusic	4/5 stars

Greatest Hits is a collection of most of the English songs by American Tejano-pop singer Selena. It contains all of her English songs from her Dreaming of You album, as well as both regularly and posthumously released English songs she had made throughout her career.

"Don't Throw Away My Love" is a remix of "My Love".

== Track listing ==
No.	Title	Writer(s)	Original album	Length
1.	"My Love"	A.B. Quintanilla III	Selena, 1989	2:51
2.	"I Could Fall in Love"	Keith Thomas	Dreaming of You, 1995	4:41
3.	"Captive Heart"	Mark Goldenberg; Kit Hain	Dreaming of You	4:17
4.	"I'm Getting Used to You"	Diane Warren	Dreaming of You	4:02
5.	"God's Child (Baila Conmigo)" (with David Byrne)	David Byrne	Dreaming of You	4:14
6.	"Dreaming of You"	Franne Golde; Tom Snow	Dreaming of You	5:24
7.	"Missing My Baby"	Quintanilla	Dreaming of You	4:13
8.	"Wherever You Are (Donde Quiera Que Estés)" (with Barrio Boyzz)	KC Porter; Miguel Flores	Dreaming of You	4:28
9.	"Only Love"	Robbie Buchanan; Mark Spiro	Siempre Selena, 1996	4:12
10.	"A Million to One"	Phil Medley	Siempre Selena	3:23
11.	"Where Did the Feeling Go?"	Norman Sallitt	Selena, 1997	3:44
12.	"Is It the Beat?"	Quintanilla; Pamela Phillips Oland	Selena, 1997	4:09
13.	"A Boy Like That"	Leonard Bernstein; Stephen Sondheim	The Songs of West Side Story, 1996	5:53
14.	"Always Mine"	Quintanilla	Anthology, 1998	3:00
15.	"Don't Throw Away My Love"	Quintanilla	Anthology	3:00
16.	"Disco Medley" (I Will Survive / Funkytown / Last Dance / The Hustle / On the Radio)	Freddie Perren; Dino Fekaris; Steven Greenberg; Paul Jabbara; Van McCoy; Giorgio Moroder; Donna Summer	Live, The Last Concert, 1995	6:55

== Charts ==
Chart (2003)	Peak position
US Billboard 200	117

== Certifications ==
Region	Certification	Certified units/sales
United States (RIAA)	4× Platinum (Latin)	240,000^{‡}
^{‡} Sales+streaming figures based on certification alone.
