= Momentos Intimos =

Compilation album by Selena
- Released: March 23, 2004
- Recorded: 1988–1995
- Length: 1:16:08
- Languages: English, Spanish
- Label: EMI Latin
- Producers: A. B. Quintanilla; Abraham Quintanilla; Guillermo J. Page

Selena chronology
Greatest Hits (2003)	Momentos Intimos (2004)	Selena Remembered (2005)

Singles from Momentos Intimos
- 1. "Como Te Quiero Yo A Ti" Released: March 2004

Momentos Intimos is a compilation album by American singer Selena and released posthumously on March 23, 2004, through EMI Latin. The album contains 24 tracks, though the last eight are spoken liner notes provided by the singer's family, friends, and her Los Dinos band. The songs on the album range from "Como Te Quiero Yo A Ti" (1988), a re-recorded version modernized and remixed on the album, to "Puede Ser", an unreleased duet with Nando "Guero" Dominguez, recorded two weeks before Selena was shot and killed in March 1995. Following Selena's death, her father Abraham Quintanilla expressed his interest in persevering his daughter's memory through her works. Selena's family has been criticized by fans and the media for exploiting the singer and cannibalizing her murder by commercializing her repertoire.

The album has received a mixed response from music critics, Ramiro Burr called it "another new collection", while a reporter from El Norte, believed fans of the singer would enjoy the release. The album yielded strong sales and was reported to be popular by consumers. Momentos Intinmos peaked at number 11 on the US Billboard Top Latin Albums chart and number seven on the US Regional Mexican Albums chart. "Como Te Quiero Yo a Ti" was released as the lead single of the album. In 2017, Momentos Intimos was certified Gold (Latin) by the Recording Industry Association of America (RIAA), denoting 30,000 units consisting of sales and on-demand streaming.

== Background ==
On March 31, 1995, American Tejano music singer Selena was shot and killed by Yolanda Saldívar, her friend and former manager of the singer's boutiques. At the time of her death the singer was working on a crossover album that would have propelled her into the American pop market. The impact of the singer's death had a negative impact on Latin music, her genre—which she catapulted into the mainstream market—suffered and its popularity waned following Selena's death. The crossover-planned album Dreaming of You was released posthumously on July 18, 1995, debuting and peaking atop the United States Billboard 200 albums chart, the first majority Spanish-language recording to do so in the chart's history. The album's release started a "buying frenzy" for anything related or containing Selena among Hispanic and Latino Americans. The releases of Selena's works continue a promise Abraham Quintanilla told his family following his daughter's death, that he will continue to keep Selena's memory alive through her music. According to A. B. Quintanilla, Suzette Quintanilla, and Selena collectively agreed that if anything were to happen to any one of them, their wish would be to continue on with their music. A.B. said that one of Selena's wishes was for her to "never go away". Since Selena's death, her family has been criticized by fans and the media for exploiting the singer and cannibalizing on her murder by commercializing her repertoire.

== Composition ==
The album contains 24 tracks, of which the last eight are spoken liner notes provided by Selena's family, friends, and her Los Dinos band members. Momentos Intimos contains songs ranging from Selena's Preciosa (1988) album to an unreleased demo track taped a few days before she died. The recording starts off with "Amor Prohibido", penned by Selena, A. B., and her backup dancer/vocalist Pete Astudillo. The song is followed by "Missing My Baby", originally on Entre a Mi Mundo, the song includes Full Force as backing vocalist. The third track, "Fotos y Recuerdos" samples the 1983 single "Back on the Chain Gang" by the Pretenders. "Fotos y Recuerdos" originally appeared on Amor Prohibido (1994), though Chrissie Hynde initially prevented Selena from releasing the song until keyboardist Ricky Vela provided Hynde an English-language translation of the lyrics. This is followed by "Dreaming of You" which was among a selection of songs Selena was provided with from Capitol Records to choose from, the label vehemently controlled the entire crossover project and only allowed Selena to choose one song of her choice from this selection. The fifth song, "Buenos Amigos", is a duet with Salvadoran singer Álvaro Torres and was originally on his album Nada Se Compara Contigo (1991).

The next song, "I'm Getting Used to You" was written by Diane Warren and produced by Rhett Lawrence. Writing for Newsday, Ira Robbins found the track's arrangement to be "slightly outdated" that masked any indications of Selena's Hispanic background. This was dramatized by Christian Serratos in the Netflix two-part limited drama Selena: The Series (2020–21), where the singer felt a sense of dissociation with the song. Warren commented that the scene was not how she recalls her time with Selena, who in reality loved the song. Track number seven, "Donde Quiera Que Estes" is a duet with New York-based the Barrio Boyzz. This is followed by "Only Love", which was originally recorded in 1990 for the crossover market but was shelved. Abraham told music critic Mario Taradell of The Dallas Morning News how the song was "too adult contemporary and we wanted to go with something more pop." The mariachi track "Tú Sólo Tú", was originally intended for the Don Juan DeMarco soundtrack, though was shelved by music producers. The tenth song on the album, "I Could Fall in Love" was previously on the planned crossover album Dreaming of You. The eleventh song, "Si Una Vez" was originally on Amor Prohibido. Writing for The Miami Herald, Tarradell described "Si Una Vez" as having a more traditional Tejano sound than the rest of the tracks on Amor Prohibido but found it to be riddled with synthesizers and digital processing.

"Where Did the Feeling Go?" is the twelfth song on Momentos Intimos, and originally appeared on the Selena movie soundtrack (1997). The thirteenth track, "No Me Queda Más", was penned by Vela, who had romantic inclinations toward the drummer of the group, Suzette, which he kept private from her. After hearing of her wedding to Bill Arriaga in September 1993, Vela wrote of his feelings of betrayal and unrequited love and hid the lyrics that he wrote based on these feelings. Vela eventually provided Selena with the lyrics and she recorded the song for Amor Prohibido. According to Abraham, Selena provided an emotional delivery while recording the track and was seen sobbing in the recording studio because "she knew how [Vela] felt" about Suzette. Track number fourteen, "Como Te Quiero Yo a Ti", originally titled "Como Te Quiero" in its original form on Preciosa (1988), is re-recorded, modernized, and remixed into a sentimental ballad along with the proceeding track "No Llores Mas Corazon". "Puede Ser", a duet with Nando "Guero" Dominguez, closes the vocal recordings of Momentos Intimos.

In mid-March 1995, Selena's husband and guitarist of the group, Chris Pérez, was in his and Selena's in-house studio and recording demos for a Corpus Christi, Texas musician that Abraham was interested in promoting on his Q-Productions label. After Dominguez left the house, Selena, who was eavesdropping, told Pérez that he should have instructed Dominguez to record the song "with more soul". Selena requested to sing the song and Pérez replayed and began recording it. At this point, Pérez noticed that Selena had listened to the entire session as she began singing the lyrics. Selena recorded the song unrehearsed and spontaneously. "Puede Ser" remained unreleased until Pérez rediscovered the demo tape in October 2001 and provided a copy to Abraham for the family to listen to since they had not heard it since April 1995. "Puede Ser" ended up becoming the last recording Selena had done before she was killed two weeks later.

== Reception ==
Momentos Intimos not only proceeds the majority Spanish-language album, Ones (2002), but also Greatest Hits (2003), a collection of English-language songs. Selena continued to outsell living musicians with her releases. Her Ones album remained on the Top Latin Albums chart for 77 consecutive weeks by the time Momentos Intimos was released. Music critic for the San Antonio Express-News, Ramiro Burr called the release "another new collection". In a recap of new releases for the week, Roel Jiménez of El Norte, called Momentos Intimos a tribute album, and believed fans of the singer would enjoy. "Como Te Quiero Yo a Ti" was released as the lead single in March 2004.

Momentos Intimos was released on March 23, 2004, and was widely popular and yielded "high sales". It debuted at number 25 on the Top Latin Albums chart and number 14 on the Regional Mexican Albums chart on the issue dated April 10, 2004. Momentos Intimos was the second best-selling regional Mexican debut album for the tracking week, behind Grupo Montez de Durango's En Vivo Desde Chicago. Following its release, Selena's family participated in a televised press conference on Univision's Primer Impacto to discuss preparations for the benefit concert Selena ¡VIVE! (2005). Momentos Intimos jumped to number 11 on the Top Latin Albums chart and number seven on the Regional Mexican Albums chart, receiving the greatest jump in sales for any album during the tracking week. It re-entered the Top Latin Albums chart at number 46 following the live premiere of Selena ¡VIVE! on the issue dated April 23, 2005, and fell off the chart the following week bringing its total weeks on the Top Latin Albums chart to 15 weeks. In 2017, Momentos Intimos was certified Gold (Latin) by the Recording Industry Association of America (RIAA), denoting 30,000 units consisting of sales and on-demand streaming.

== Track listing ==
Credits adapted from the liner notes of Momentos Intimos by EMI Latin.

No.	Title	Writer(s)	Production	Length
1.	"Amor Prohibido" (previously on Amor Prohibido)	Selena Quintanilla–Pérez, A. B. Quintanilla, Pete Astudillo	A. B., Jorge Alberto Pino, Bebu Silvetti, Gregg Vickers	2:51
2.	"Missing My Baby" (previously on Entre a Mi Mundo)	A.B.	A.B.	4:14
3.	"Fotos y Recuerdos" (previously on Amor Prohibido)	Chrissie Hynde, Ricky Vela	A. B.	2:36
4.	"Dreaming of You" (previously on Dreaming of You)	Franne Golde, Tom Snow	Guy Roche	5:16
5.	"Buenos Amigos" (duet with Álvaro Torres, previously on his album Nada Se Compara Contigo)	Torres	Enrique Elizondo	4:46
6.	"I'm Getting Used to You" (previously on Dreaming of You)	Diane Warren	Rhett Lawrence	4:05
7.	"Donde Quiera Que Estes" (duet with the Barrio Boyzz, previously on their album Donde Quiera Que Estes)	Miguel Flores, K. C. Porter, Desmond Child	A. B., Silvetti, Domingo Padilla	4:29
8.	"Only Love" (previously on Siempre Selena)	Robbie Buchanan, Mark Spiro	Porter	4:14
9.	"Tú Sólo Tú" (previously on Dreaming of You)	Felipe Valdés Lea	José Hernández	3:14
10.	"I Could Fall in Love" (previously on Dreaming of You)	Keith Thomas	Thomas	4:43
11.	"Si Una Vez" (previously on Amor Prohibido)	A. B., Astudillo	A. B.	2:46
12.	"Where Did the Feeling Go?" (previously on Selena: The Original Motion Picture Soundtrack)	Michael Masser, Norman Saleet	A. B.	3:45
13.	"No Me Queda Más" (previously on Amor Prohibido)	Vela	A. B.	3:20
14.	"Como Te Quiero Yo a Ti" (re-recorded, previously on Preciosa)	Vela	Abraham Quintanilla	3:25
15.	"No Llores Mas Corazon" (re-recorded, previously on Dulce Amor)	Copyright Control	Abraham	3:51
16.	"Puede Ser" (previously unreleased duet with Nando "Guero" Dominguez)	Vela, Chris Pérez	A. B.	3:42
17.	"Amor Prohibido"	Astudillo, Pérez^{a}	Suzette Quintanilla	2:16
18.	"Missing My Baby"	A. B.^{a}	Suzette	0:58
19.	"Fotos y Recuerdos"	A. B., Pérez, Vela^{a}	Suzette	1:26
20.	"Dreaming of You"	A. B., Pérez^{a}	Suzette	2:10
21.	"Donde Quiera Que Estes"	A. B.^{a}	Suzette	1:37
22.	"I Could Fall in Love"	A. B., Pérez^{a}	Suzette	3:33
23.	"Si Una Vez"	Astudillo, Vela^{a}	Suzette	1:00
24.	"No Me Queda Más"	A. B., Suzette, Abraham^{a}	Suzette	1:51
Total length:				1:16:08

Notes

- ^{^[a]} spoken liner notes provided by Selena's family, friends, and her Los Dinos band.

== Personnel ==
Credits are adapted of Momentos Intimos liner notes.

Musicians

- Selena – lead vocals
- The Barrio Boyzz – guest artist
- Nando "Guero" Dominguez – guest artist
- Álvaro Torres – guest artist
- Ricky Vela – keyboardist
- Joe Ojeda – keyboardist
- Chris Pérez – guitarist

Production

- Guillermo J. Page – executive producer
- A. B. Quintanilla – producer, arranger, remixer
- Suzette Quintanilla – spoken liner notes producer, drums
- Abraham Quintanilla – spoken liner notes post-production

== Charts ==
Weekly chart performance for Momentos Intimos
Chart (2004)	Peak position
US Top Latin Albums (Billboard)	11
US Regional Mexican Albums (Billboard)	7

== Certification ==
Certification for Momentos Intimos
Region	Certification	Certified units/sales
United States (RIAA)	Gold (Latin)	30,000^{‡}
^{‡} Sales+streaming figures based on certification alone.
