= Unforgettable (Selena album) =

2005 compilation album by Selena

Unforgettable is a four-piece set celebrating the life of the late Tejano singer Selena, released in promotion for the tribute concert Selena ¡VIVE! The set consisted of two albums, which were released on the same day as separate discs: Unforgettable: The Live Album and Unforgettable: The Studio Album.

A week later, on April 5, 2005, Unforgettable: Limited Edition was released, which combined the studio and live album with two DVDs.

== Track listings and information ==
Unforgettable: The Live Album

Greatest hits album by Selena
- Released: March 29, 2005 (US)
- Recorded: 1990s
- Genre: Tejano/Latin pop
- Length: 56:31
- Label: EMI
- Producer: Abraham Quintanilla III

Selena chronology
Selena Remembered (2005)	Unforgettable: The Live Album (2005)	Selena ¡VIVE! (2005)

=== Unforgettable: The Live Album ===
Unforgettable - The Live Album is a collection of Selena's greatest hits performed in concert and compiled for previously released live albums. It was released on March 29, 2005, peaking at number 26 on the Latin Album Chart. Many fans were disappointed when "No Debes Jugar" and "La Llamada" were not released live.

1. Como La Flor (from Selena Live!)
2. Amor Prohibido (from Live! The Last Concert)
3. Baila Esta Cumbia (from Live! The Last Concert)
4. Ya Ves (from Selena Live!)
5. Las Cadenas (from Selena Live!)
6. Yo Te Amo (from Selena Live!)
7. Tus Desprecios (from Live! The Last Concert)
8. Cobarde (from Live! The Last Concert)
9. Si La Quieres (from Selena Live!)
10. El Chico Del Apartamento 512 (from Live! The Last Concert)
11. Bidi Bidi Bom Bom (from Live! The Last Concert)
12. Si Una Vez (from Live! The Last Concert)
13. Que Creias (from Selena Live!)
14. No Me Queda Mas (from Live! The Last Concert)
15. Como La Flor (from Live! The Last Concert)
16. No Debes Jugar
17. La Llamada

=== Unforgettable: The Studio Album ===
Unforgettable: The Studio Album

Greatest hits album by Selena
- Released: March 29, 2005 (US)
- Recorded: 1990s
- Genre: Tejano/Latin pop
- Length: 58:08

Unforgettable - The Studio Album is a collection of Selena's greatest hits. It was released on March 29, 2005, peaking at number 17 on the Latin Album Chart, and was later certified Gold.

1. Como La Flor
2. La Carcacha
3. No Debes Jugar
4. La Llamada
5. Amor Prohibido
6. No Me Queda Mas
7. Fotos Y Recuerdos
8. El Chico Del Apartamento 512
9. Bidi Bidi Bom Bom
10. Techno Cumbia
11. Si Una Vez
12. Tu, Solo Tu
13. I Could Fall In Love
14. Dreaming Of You
15. Puede Ser
16. No Quiero Saber
17. Baila Esta Cumbia

=== Unforgettable: Limited Edition ===
Unforgettable: Limited Edition

Greatest hits album by Selena
- Released: April 5, 2005 (US)

Disc 3 - Selena Videos

1. No Quiero Saber
2. La Carcacha
3. Buenos Amigos
4. La Llamada
5. Amor Prohibido
6. No Me Queda Más
7. Bidi Bidi Bom Bom
8. Techno Cumbia
9. Donde Quiera Que Estés
10. Tú, Sólo Tú
11. Siempre Hece Frío
12. I Could Fall in Love
13. Dreaming of You

Disc 4 - Selena Remembered

1. Music Legend
2. Beginning
3. Tejano Superstar
4. Label Deal
5. Evolution
6. Entre a Mi Mundo
7. Breakthrough
8. Amor Prohibido
9. Selena's World
10. Dreaming of You

== Charts ==
Unforgettable: The Studio Album

Chart (2005)	Peak position
US Top Latin Albums	17
US Top Regional Mexican Albums	7

Unforgettable: The Live Album

Chart (2005)	Peak position
US Top Latin Albums	26
US Top Regional Mexican Albums	14

Unforgettable: The Special Edition

Chart (2005)	Peak position
US Top Latin Albums	18
US Top Regional Mexican Albums	8

== Certifications ==
Region	Certification	Certified units/sales
United States (RIAA)	Platinum (Latin)	60,000^{‡}
^{‡} Sales+streaming figures based on certification alone.
