= Moonchild Mixes =

Remix album by Selena
- Released: August 26, 2022
- Recorded: 1986 – 1988, 2019-22 (remixed)
- Studio: AMEN Studios
- Genre: Tejano cumbia
- Length: 43:26
- Label: Warner Music Latina
- Producer: A.B. Quintanilla

Selena chronology
Ones (2021)	Moonchild Mixes (2022)

Singles from Moonchild Mixes
- 1. "Como Te Quiero Yo A Ti" Released: July 29, 2022; 2. "Salta La Ranita" Released: September 23, 2022

Moonchild Mixes is an album by Selena. It was released posthumously through Warner Music Latina on August 26, 2022. The album originated in 2011 by Selena's brother and music producer A.B. Quintanilla, who wanted to modernize previously released and unreleased songs recorded by Selena. A.B. was able to de-tune Selena's voice, making her sound older than she really was in the original recordings.

News of the album's release sparked criticisms by fans who believed the album would not be authentic and questioned the motives of the Quintanilla family in releasing the album. Critics shared fans' negative reactions towards the album, questioning the ethics of Selena's voice being retouched by computers.

"Como Te Quiero Yo A Ti" was released as the lead single of Moonchild Mixes on July 29, 2022.

Moonchild Mixes debuted at number 12 on the US Billboard Top Album Sales, including number 8 on the Top Latin Albums, number 1 on the Latin Pop Albums and number 2 on the Regional Mexican Albums charts with 5,000 album-equivalent units.

== Background and production ==
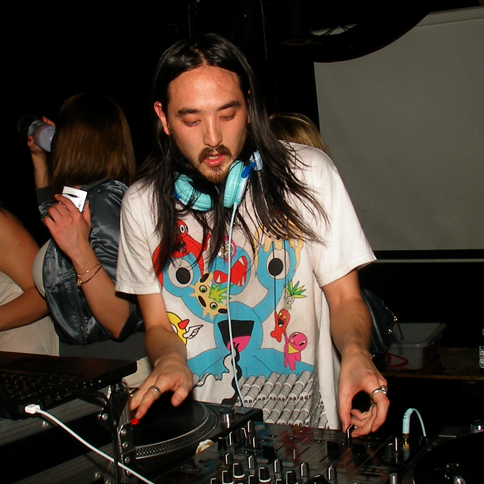
A.B. Quintanilla used Steve Aoki's (pictured) soundpack to remix the songs on the album.

The album's release continues a promise Abraham Quintanilla told his family following the shooting death of Selena on March 31, 1995, that he will continue to preserve her memory through her music. According to A.B. Quintanilla, Suzette Quintanilla, and Selena collectively agreed that if anything were to happen to any one of them, their wish would be to continue on with their music. A.B. said that one of Selena's wishes was for her to "never go away", the Quintanilla family believes that by releasing Moonchild Mixes, they are upholding Selena's wish. The development of this album traces back to 2011 when Abraham and A.B. had wanted to create an album with modernized tracks of previously released material and five unreleased songs from Selena prior to her contractual commitments with EMI Latin in 1989. They announced the album could be released in fall 2011 or early 2012. On August 17, 2011, Abraham announced that the album would be released in 2012 with ten tracks from a selection of five master recordings Selena recorded in the 1980s. Abraham said his goal was to "rejuvenate their sounds and bring them up to date". EMI Latin decided on a remix album with tracks by Selena turned into duets with popular artists. The album, Enamorada de Ti, was released in April 2012 to critical and commercial success.

Abraham and A.B. revived their original plans to release a remix album in 2019 with a 2020 release date. The album's production was the first project that A.B., Abraham, and Suzette all participated in since the 2004 release of Momentos Intimos. During an interview with podcaster Smoothvega in April 2020, A.B. spoke about the remix album telling fans of Selena that "you got juicy music tracks and textures and colors of beautiful pictures that I've painted and Selena has put her vocals on them." However, due to the COVID-19 pandemic, the album was postponed. A.B. resumed production of the album through 2021, using Steve Aoki's soundpack to remix the songs. He revealed that he was able to de-tune Selena's vocals which provided her with a deeper sound, making the singer sound older than what she really was in the original recordings.

Suzette found the new arrangements on Moonchild Mixes to have "breathe new light" on the recordings made during the 1980s and believed it felt "like [Selena] went into the studio again and recorded [them]." A.B.'s desire to release Moonchild Mixes originated of Selena's "ability to transcend generations", while Suzette noticed that a newer, and younger, generation is discovering her and are interested to know more about her. Suzette believed that it was important to curate an album of older material and rejuvenate them for the newer generation. A.B. found the process of converting Selena's vinyl into the digital age challenging. Along with temporal measurement adjustments, he had to "clean Selena's vocals" as well as lowering her pitch "just a hair" in order to make Selena sound mature.

The album was expected to be released in April 2022, through WEA Latina. In May, Abraham announced that the recording would be released sometime that year. On July 11, it was announced that Moonchild Mixes would be released on August 26, through streaming platforms, alongside a physical release.

On March 15, 2022, Abraham announced that the follow-up album will contain "1980s-era Tejano music" with a tracklisting containing a sample of "50 unreleased songs" recorded by Selena.

== Songs ==
The songs on the album are tracks recorded by Selena during her teenage years and her vocals have been digitally modified to make her sound as if she recorded them "right before her passing". The songs on the album have been modernized, utilizing technology to create "beautiful [new] arrangements" from songs recorded in the 1980s. The album will contain a mixture of ballads and cumbias, with some electronic dance music influences. The album contains 13 songs with "completely new arrangements" by A.B. Initially, media reports wrote that the album would have a mixture of released and unreleased songs recorded by Selena, and that ten of the 13 songs would be previously unreleased songs. One track includes a song Selena recorded in 1983 or 1984 when she was 13-years-old, the oldest track on the record. A.B. was able to update her vocals digitally to change its timbre.

The first single released from Moonchild Mixes, "Como Te Quiero Yo a Ti" was released through digital and streaming platforms on July 29, 2022. It is the third version of the song following its original debut in Preciosa (1988) and a re-recorded version on Momentos Intimos (2004). In a Good Morning America segment, John Quiñones believed the song "honors the Tejano legend's memory and legacy." A.B. revealed that it took him over a year to update the sounds on "Como Te Quiero Yo a Ti" to its finished product because of "many obstacles" that prevented him from doing so. Reactions to "Como Te Quiero Yo a Ti" were positive following the announcement of it as the album's single.

== Reception ==
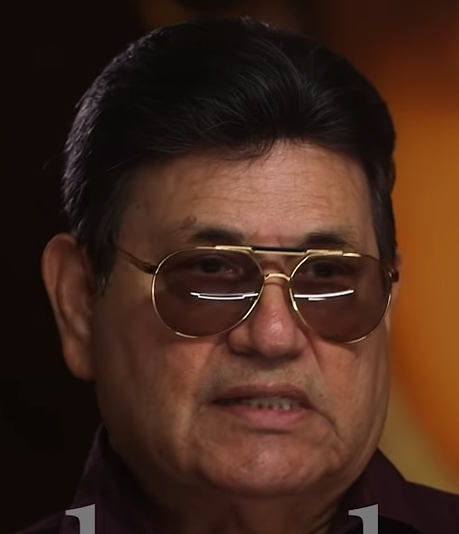
Abraham Quintanilla (pictured) believed the album would be responded to positively. However, critics have remained largely negative, questioning the ethics involved in the computer manipulation of Selena.

Abraham announced the album through an interview with San Antonio-based Latin Groove News on March 10, 2022. The album has been completed, though it was being remastered while the artwork was being handled by Suzette, at the time. In April 2020, A.B. revealed that their mother, Marcella Quintanilla, had originally selected the artwork for the album before it was postponed due to the COVID-19 pandemic. According to Abraham, this album has been long-awaited by fans of the singer and believed it will be received positively by the public. News of the album's release sparked criticism from fans who believed the album would not be authentic, while others questioned the family's motive for releasing the album believing they "are profiting off [of Selena's death]". Abraham responded that he is aware of their criticisms and believed that those who are critical of the album are unaware on the recording contract that the family made with Selena prior to her death. Abraham has received negative comments from fans since Selena's death; he initially found her fan's criticisms hurtful, though he now says that the negative comments he receives no longer bother him. EMI Latin has released a plethora of posthumous albums, as well as unreleased material by Selena since her death. Suzette stressed that the preservation of Selena's legacy through her works has been a difficult task that has made it harder for the family in coping with the singer's absence. A.B. recalled a phrase Selena would often say: "The goal isn't to live forever but to create something that will" when interviewed by a reporter for La Prensa Latina on the negative responses the family has received. Biographer Joe Nick Patoski, called the commercialization of Selena a business, saying that "it happens when your father is your manager".

WOAI-TV called comments such as "just let her die" and "let her go, she's dead" that were left by people on their Facebook posts on Selena, as seemingly insensitive. Matt Wille of InPut Magazine, believes that positive responses by fans depend "greatly on the care" the family incorporates in the recordings. Critics have questioned the ethics involved in creating the album. Wille questions this in the involvement in the computer manipulation of a singer who has died saying the "conversation is much less clear-cut", in comparison to living musicians who use this technology, he also questioned whether or not Selena would have approved of this album. This concern was echoed by Craig Huber of Spectrum News, who found the idea of updating a 13-year-old Selena song both "interestingly, and perhaps controversially". In a poll conducted by The Today Show, 57% of participants believed that unreleased songs by Selena should not be released with a digitally updated voice, while 29% believed that there is no harm in doing so, 14% were neutral or had no opinion. Stella Chavez of National Public Radio (NPR) took to Twitter to complain about the new release disliking the idea of Selena's voice being "done using computers". Suzette Exposito of Rolling Stone magazine, also took to Twitter to criticize the release writing that "nothing is stopping Selena's family from working with new artists today". According to Joe Bennett, a forensic musicologist and professor at Berklee College of Music, the ability to digitally age Selena's voice is "a simple process" that he believes "could potentially require just an isolated recording of the singer and the appropriate digital software." A journalist for The Los Angeles Times, called the project "a Selena robot album" that the singer wouldn't have wanted.

In their response to critics, A.B. and Suzette agreed that if Selena were alive, she would have been overjoyed of Moonchild Mixes. Suzette believes in tuning out critics, "what critics? We don't care about them", as she later puts it. She finds that "as an artist and musicians and people that are in the public eye" need to find a way to ignore those who oppose them. She explained that her family will continue "to do what we want with our music, with our sister, with our band", though they want people to understand their projects for Selena have been done "with loving care and with beauty." A.B. disagrees with the notion that the family is taking "advantage of Selena's legacy", saying that "what we're doing is honoring her memory, her legacy. That's what it's about".

== Track listing ==
Moonchild Mixes track listing
No.	Title	Writer(s)	Producer(s)	Length
1.	"Como Te Quiero Yo A Ti" (Regional Mexican Version)	Ricky Vela	A.B. Quintanilla	3:09
2.	"Dame Tu Amor" (Regional Mexican Version)	Vela, Abraham Quintanilla	A.B. Quintanilla	3:19
3.	"No Llores Más"	Vela, A.B. Quintanilla	A.B. Quintanilla	3:45
4.	"Cariño Mío"	Vela	A.B. Quintanilla	3:30
5.	"Salta La Ranita"	Víctor H. Garza	A.B. Quintanilla	3:03
6.	"Corazoncito" (Regional Mexican Version)	A.B., Manny Guerra	A.B. Quintanilla	2:21
7.	"Dame Tu Amor" (Cumbia Version)	Vela, Abraham	A.B. Quintanilla	3:23
8.	"Enamorada de Ti"	Luisa Fatello, Teresa Presmanes	A.B. Quintanilla	3:48
9.	"Pensando en Ti"	Vela	A.B. Quintanilla	3:32
10.	"Como Te Quiero Yo a Ti" (Pop Version)	Vela	A.B. Quintanilla	3:32
11.	"Sabes"	Vela	A.B. Quintanilla	2:47
12.	"Soy Amiga"	Vela	A.B. Quintanilla	3:48
13.	"Como Te Quiero Yo a Ti" (Cumbia Version)	Vela	A.B. Quintanilla	3:29
Total length:				43:26

== Personnel ==
- Selena – lead vocals
- A.B. Quintanilla – producer, remixer
- Suzette Quintanilla – producer, artwork direction

== Charts ==
Weekly chart performance for Moonchild Mixes
Chart (2022)	Peak position
US Latin Pop Albums (Billboard)	1
US Regional Mexican Albums (Billboard)	2
US Top Album Sales (Billboard)	12
US Top Latin Albums (Billboard)	8

== Works cited ==
- "Selena Chart History: Regional Mexican Albums". Billboard.
- "Selena Chart History: Top Latin Albums". Billboard.
- Quiñones, John; Valle, Alondra; Peduto, Sabrina (July 29, 2022). "Exclusive: Selena Quintanilla's family on making of her posthumous music". Good Morning America. Archived from the original on July 29, 2022.
- Garcia, Ariana (July 23, 2022). "New track from Selena's highly anticipated posthumous album is releasing Friday". Laredo Morning Times. Archived from the original on July 23, 2022.
- Quintanilla, Nora (May 18, 2022). "Selena: A family business going strong 27 years after her death - La Prensa Latina Media". La Prensa Latina. Archived from the original on July 11, 2022.
- "Top Latin Albums > 21 April 2012". Billboard. Prometheus Global Media. Archived from the original on May 26, 2024.
- Sullivan, Jon. "Two Selena albums of unreleased music on the way". Sunny99.iheart.com. Archived from the original on July 11, 2022.
- Garcia, Ricky; Gamboa, Suzanne (March 15, 2022). "New digitally modified Selena music announcement gets mixed reviews online". Kxan.com. Archived from the original on July 11, 2022.
- Smoothvega (April 30, 2020). "AB Quintanilla Talks 'Selena' Netflix Series, Announces Final Album, His Career, Legacy + More". YouTube (Podcast). Event occurs at 23:00 (1st), 1:08:00 (2nd), 1:35:00 (3rd). Archived from the original on July 11, 2022.
- Victoria, Lewis (March 15, 2022). "5 Things To Know On Tuesday, March 15, 2022". WPTV.com. Archived from the original on July 11, 2022.
- Paul, Maria Luisa. "More 'Bidi Bidi Bom Bom' to come: Selena's father announces new album nearly 27 years after the singer's death". The Washington Post. Archived from the original on March 15, 2022.
- Lopez, Julyssa (March 15, 2022). "Selena's Father Says A New Album Is Coming 27 Years After Her Death". Rolling Stone India. Archived from the original on July 11, 2022.
- Mendoza, Madalyn (March 14, 2022). "Quintanilla family is releasing new Selena album nearly 30 years after the Tejano icon's death". Houston Chronicle. Archived from the original on July 11, 2022.
- Romaine, Jenna (March 15, 2022). "New music from Selena to drop next month, 26 years after her death". The Hill. Archived from the original on July 11, 2022.
- Wille, Matt (March 15, 2022). "New Selena album uses software to artificially age singer's childhood voice". InPut Magazine. Archived from the original on July 11, 2022.
- Darville, Jordan. "A new Selena album with unreleased music will be released this spring". Fader.com. Archived from the original on July 11, 2022.
- Sciarretto, Amy (June 27, 2011). "New Posthumous Music From Selena May Be Released". PopCrush.com. Archived from the original on January 31, 2013.
- Acosta, Sarah (February 16, 2012). "New Selena Album Featuring Artists Including Selena Gomez Will Be Released in April". Corpus Christi Caller Times. Archived from the original on February 17, 2012.
- Lopetegui, Enrique (April 11, 2012). "Selena: 'Enamorada de ti' Aural Pleasure Review". San Antonio Current. Archived from the original on February 1, 2013.
- Tino Cochino (April 30, 2020). "A.B. Quintanilla talks new single, new Selena remix album, and shares never before heard stories!". YouTube (Podcast). Event occurs at 32:00. Archived from the original on July 11, 2022.
- Huber, Craig. "New Selena music due out as soon as April". Spectrum News. Archived from the original on July 11, 2022.
- Gamboa, Suzanne (March 15, 2022). "Get ready, Selena fans: New music from the queen of Tejano is coming". Today.com. Archived from the original on July 11, 2022.
- Reindl, Andrea (March 15, 2022). "Selena Quintanilla Fans Are Divided Over an Upcoming New Album in Which Her Voice Has Been 'Worked on With Computers'". Mitu.com. Archived from the original on July 11, 2022.
- Ibrahim, Samantha (March 16, 2022). "Selena's family accused of trying to profit off of posthumous album". New York Post. Archived from the original on July 11, 2022.
- Chung, Christine (March 17, 2022). "Selena's Family Announces New Album, 27 Years After Her Death". The New York Times. Archived from the original on March 18, 2022.
- WOAI-TV (March 5, 2021). "'Como La Flor' author opens up about Selena and the Quintanillas". YouTube (Podcast). Event occurs at 1:03:00. Archived from the original on July 11, 2022.
- Edward James Olmos (narrator), Jose Behar (executive producer), Abraham Quintanilla (executive producer), Claribel Cuevas (associate producer), Randal J. Edwards (associate producer), Ila von Hasperg (editor), Jeffrey Coulter (producer), Cecelia Miniucchi (director) (April 1, 1997). Selena Remembered (Documentary) (in English and Spanish). Corpus Christi, Texas: EMI Latin Productions, Q-Productions. Event occurs at 20:40. Archived from the original (DVD, VHS) on April 1, 2022.
- Martinez, Fidel (March 17, 2022). "Latinx Files: Are we ready for a 'computerized' Selena album?". Los Angeles Times. Archived from the original on July 11, 2022.
- Olvera, Crystal (August 17, 2011). "New Selena Music Coming 2012". Corpus Christi Caller-Times – via Newspapers.com.
