= List of Billboard Regional Mexican Albums number ones of 2000 =

The Regional Mexican Albums, published in Billboard magazine, is a record chart that features Latin music sales information for regional styles of Mexican music. This data are compiled by Nielsen SoundScan from a sample that includes music stores, music departments at department stores and verifiable sales from concert venues in the United States.

== Albums ==
Issue Date	Album	Artist	Reference
January 1	All My Hits Vol. 2	Selena	
January 8	All My Hits Vol. 2	Selena	
January 15	All My Hits Vol. 2	Selena	
January 22	All My Hits Vol. 2	Selena	
January 29	Lo Mejor De Mi Vida	Banda El Recodo	
February 5	Lo Mejor De Mi Vida	Banda El Recodo	
February 12	Morir de Amor	Conjunto Primavera	
February 19	Morir de Amor	Conjunto Primavera	
February 26	Morir de Amor	Conjunto Primavera	
March 4	Morir de Amor	Conjunto Primavera	
March 11	Morir de Amor	Conjunto Primavera	
March 18	En la Madrugada Se Fue	Los Temerarios	
March 25	En la Madrugada Se Fue	Los Temerarios	
April 1	En la Madrugada Se Fue	Los Temerarios	
April 8	En la Madrugada Se Fue	Los Temerarios	
April 15	All My Hits Vol. 2 †	Selena	
April 22	All My Hits Vol. 2 †	Selena	
April 29	Guerra de Estados Pesados	Various Artists	
May 6	Guerra de Estados Pesados	Various Artists	
May 13	All My Hits Vol. 2 †	Selena	
May 20	All My Hits Vol. 2 †	Selena	
May 27	Guerra de Estados Pesados	Various Artists	
June 3	Secreto de Amor	Joan Sebastian	
June 10	Por Encima De Todo	Limite	
June 17	Por Encima De Todo	Limite	
June 24	Secreto de Amor †	Joan Sebastian	
July 1	Secreto de Amor †	Joan Sebastian	
July 8	Secreto de Amor †	Joan Sebastian	
July 15	Secreto de Amor †	Joan Sebastian	
July 22	Secreto de Amor †	Joan Sebastian	
July 29	Secreto de Amor †	Joan Sebastian	
August 5	Secreto de Amor †	Joan Sebastian	
August 12	Secreto de Amor †	Joan Sebastian	
August 19	En Que Trabaja El Muchacho	Los Huracanes del Norte	
August 26	En Que Trabaja El Muchacho	Los Huracanes del Norte	
September 2	En Que Trabaja El Muchacho	Los Huracanes del Norte	
September 9	En Que Trabaja El Muchacho	Los Huracanes del Norte	
September 16	En Que Trabaja El Muchacho	Los Huracanes del Norte	
September 23	En Que Trabaja El Muchacho	Los Huracanes del Norte	
September 30	Lo Grande De Los Grandes	Pepe Aguilar	
October 7	De Paisano A Paisano	Los Tigres del Norte	
October 14	De Paisano A Paisano	Los Tigres del Norte	
October 21	De Paisano A Paisano	Los Tigres del Norte	
October 28	De Paisano A Paisano	Los Tigres del Norte	
November 4	De Paisano A Paisano	Los Tigres del Norte	
November 11	De Paisano A Paisano	Los Tigres del Norte	
November 18	De Paisano A Paisano	Los Tigres del Norte	
November 25	De Paisano A Paisano	Los Tigres del Norte	
December 2	Corridos De Primera Plana	Los Tucanes de Tijuana	
December 9	Historia De Un Idolo Vol. 1	Vicente Fernández	
December 16	Es Para Ti	Intocable	
December 23	Historia De Un Idolo Vol. 1 †	Vicente Fernández	
December 30	Historia De Un Idolo Vol. 1 †	Vicente Fernández	
