= Quiero (Selena y Los Dinos song) =

Single by Selena y Los Dinos

from the album Preciosa
- Released: March 30, 1988
- Recorded: 1988
- Studio: AMEN Studios (San Antonio, TX)
- Genre: Latin
- Label: Manny Labels

Selena y Los Dinos singles chronology
"Terco Corazon" (1988)	"Quiero" (1988)	"Contigo Quiero Estar" (1988)

Quiero (Spanish for I Want) was released as a promotional single for the band Selena y Los Dinos in 1988. "Quiero" was the second out of four released singles from the album Preciosa. A.B. Quintanilla wrote "Quiero". "Quiero" is one of the 12 favorite songs from Selena in 1991 at the time.

== Versions and album appearances ==
- Preciosa: Contained the original version of "Quiero". From this album "Quiero" was released as a promotional single in 1988 of that same year Preciosa was released.
- Mis Primeros Éxitos: Contained the new updated version of "Quiero". This album was released in 1990 from EMI.
- Personal Best: Contained the original version of "Quiero". This album was released in 1991. At the time "Quiero" was considered one of Selena's favorite songs.
- Selena (Cema Records): Contained the updated version of "Quiero". From this point on the updated "Quiero" got more adopted in future Selena albums. This album was released in 1994.
- Mis Primeros Éxitos: This album was re-released in 2002. This album contained the original version of "Quiero".
- Selena Y Sus Inicios Vol. 3: This album contained the updated version of "Quiero". This album was released in 2004.
- Classic Series, Vol. 4: This album contained the original version of "Quiero". This album was released in 2007.

== In Concert ==
- Johnny Canales Show (1989)
- Tejano Music Awards (1990); Opening
- La Feria Monterrey (1993)
