= 16 Super Éxitos Originales =

Greatest hits album by Selena
- Released: March 3, 1990
- Recorded: 1989–90
- Studios: Master Productions (16 Super Éxitos Originales); Q-Productions (Mis Primeros Éxitos)
- Genre: Tejano
- Length: 53:26
- Language: Spanish
- Label: Capitol/EMI Latin
- Producer: A.B. Quintanilla

Selena chronology
Selena (1989)	16 Super Éxitos Originales (1990)	Ven Conmigo (1990)

16 Super Éxitos Originales (English: 16 Original Super Hits) is a greatest hits album by American singer Selena released on March 3, 1990, through Capitol/EMI Latin. The label aimed to release a compilation containing recordings by Selena y Los Dinos prior to their contractual agreement in 1989, to illustrate the band's musical progressions up to that point. 16 Super Éxitos Originales encompasses 16 tracks re-recorded under new arrangements, ranging from compositions recorded through Freddie Records in 1983 to the group's Dulce Amor (1988) album. The album received critical acclaim from music critics, who found it to have contained recordings that solidified Selena's status in the Tejano music market and introduced her to a broader audience. The album peaked at number 22 on the US Billboard Regional Mexican Albums chart. EMI Latin posthumously re-issued 16 Super Éxitos Originales under the title Mis Primeros Éxitos (English: My First Hits) on August 13, 2002.

== Background and production ==
Following the 1989 Tejano Music Awards, Selena y Los Dinos signed with Capitol/EMI Latin and released their debut studio album that same year. The label hesitated to let A.B. Quintanilla maintain his role as the group's producer. However, given the uncertainty of Tejano music's future, the company acquiesced, allowing A.B. to stay on as producer but cautioning that failure would result in his replacement by a company-approved candidate. Following the debut album by the band, led by vocalist Selena, surpassing the performance of other female Tejano artists' releases, A.B. secured his position.

The golden era of Tejano music was ushered in with the acquisition of Bob Grever's Cara Records on January 10, 1990, catalyzing a shift in the genre's emphasis from polkas to cumbia music. Despite the waning demand for Manny Guerra's production and music engineering services amidst the genre's surge in popularity, he contributed his services for 16 Super Éxitos Originales. Following Selena's endorsement agreement with Coca-Cola, subsequent to her contract with Capitol/EMI Latin, the group decided to invest their earnings in acquiring new equipment. Empowered by these advancements, Selena resolved to learn Spanish, driven by escalating demand for press interviews. Initially, the singer recorded songs phonetically. Selena expressed her aspirations to attain fluency in the language, recognizing the value of bilingualism as a catalyst for personal and professional growth, believing it to be a testament to enhanced intelligence and broader opportunities in both business and interpersonal communication.

Capitol/EMI Latin sought to release a greatest hits album of the band's recordings predating their contractual agreement; they aspired to curate an album that encapsulated the group's musical trajectory up to that point. The group re-recorded the songs under new arrangements at Master Productions in Weslaco, Texas, which paradoxically manifested as a tin-clad garage structure. A.B., in re-telling his experience in producing 16 Super Éxitos Originales, noticed that the material intended for roofing purposes adorned the entirety of the edifice's exterior, rendering his experience memorable. Although the studio was a sought-after recording facility among prominent Tejano musicians, A.B. found it to be encompassing rudimentary recording techniques, though enjoyed experiencing the recording studio as an exceedingly fortuitous opportunity. This was the final album to include guitarist Roger Garcia, who was briefly replaced by Mike Orosco.

== Music ==
The compilation encompasses 16 tracks re-recorded under new arrangements, ranging from compositions recorded through Freddie Records in 1983 to the group's Dulce Amor (1988) album. The album commences with "Estoy Contigo", originally recorded in 1983 for Cara Records. This is followed by "Sentimientos", a cover version of Al Hurricane. The third track is "Acuérdate de Mi", originally taken from And the Winner Is... (1987), and is followed by "Tú No Sabes" (1987), the group's first mariachi-style recording. "Tú No Sabes", written by keyboardist Ricky Vela, was originally conceived as a melancholic mariachi piece; however, A.B. advocated for a cumbia direction and undertook its reformation during the band's rehearsal session preceding the recording. The following tracks, "Costumbres" and "Siempre", are covers of Juan Gabriel, while the seventh song, "Dame Un Beso", is an original song written by A.B. and Vela in 1986. "Dame Un Beso" materialized as a result of A.B.'s futile endeavor to procure compositions from Luis Silva, who was the recipient of many Songwriter of the Year awards. Silva ignored the group during the beginning phases of their music careers.

The eighth track on 16 Super Éxitos Originales, "Yo Fui Aquella", was one of the first songs A.B. composed. Although he expeditiously composed the melody for the song, it required several days of diligent effort before A.B. ultimately finalized the lyrics. The subsequent tracks, "Cariño, Cariño Mío" and "Dulce Amor", are both taken from the Dulce Amor (1988) album, while following tracks "Quiero Estar Contigo" and "Terco Corazón" are taken from Preciosa (1988). The thirteenth track, "Dime" originally appeared on Dulce Amor, while the subsequent track, "Ya Se Va", was one of the first singles released by Selena y Los Dinos in 1983. Vela expressed elation upon Selena's recording of "Cien Años" (1988), included as the compilation's fifteenth track, as it evoked poignant reminiscences of his childhood of listening to songs by Pedro Infante. "Quiero", from the Preciosa album, serves as the concluding track for the compilation.

== Release and critical reception ==
Professional ratings
Review scores
Source	Rating
AllMusic	3.5/5 stars

16 Super Éxitos Originales preceded the 1990 Tejano Music Awards, held on March 9, 1990, and followed Selena's appearance at Fulmore Junior High talking to students about the importance of getting their high school diploma that was sponsored by the Texas Commission on Alcohol and Drug Abuse. The compilation was released on March 3, through Capitol/EMI Latin. It peaked at number 22 on the US Billboard Regional Mexican Albums chart, on the issue dated May 5, 1990. As part of a commemoration of Selena's twentieth year since entering the music industry, EMI Latin re-issued nine albums of the singer in a series of releases, including 16 Super Éxitos Originales, repackaged as Mis Primeros Éxitos on August 13, 2002. The reissue included a bonus track containing spoken liner notes with commentary from Selena's family, friends, and band, retelling the creative process and inspiration behind the album.

Texas Monthly's Joe Nick Patoski listed 16 Super Éxitos Originales as one of his recommended listens as part of his 1992 article on the best Texas music albums. As Selena's biographer, Patoski believed Capitol/EMI Latin's swift release of 16 Super Éxitos Originales served as a manifestation of the singer's appeal and allure. Latin Style magazine found the songs to have substantiated Selena's status as a dominant figure in the Tejano music market; they found the album to have served as a vehicle to introduce Selena to a broader audience, delineating the path she would embark upon as a performer. Houston Chronicle's Joey Guerra called 16 Super Éxitos Originales as a comprehensive examination of Selena's early career.

== Track listing ==
Credits adapted from the liner notes of 16 Super Éxitos Originales by EMI Latin.

No.	Title	Writer(s)	Length
1.	"Estoy Contigo"	Abraham Quintanilla	3:15
2.	"Sentimientos" (original version on Alpha)	Al Hurricane; Tiny Morrie	3:13
3.	"Acuerdate de Mi" (original version on And the Winner Is...)	A.B. Quintanilla	3:36
4.	"Tú No Sabes" (original version on And the Winner Is...)	Ricky Vela	3:31
5.	"Costumbres" (original version on Dulce Amor)	Juan Gabriel	3:46
6.	"Siempre" (original version on Preciosa)	Gabriel	3:35
7.	"Dame Un Beso" (original version on Alpha)	A.B.; Vela	3:52
8.	"Yo Fui Aquella" (original version on Preciosa)	A.B.	3:01
9.	"Cariño, Cariño Mío" (original version on Dulce Amor)	A.B.	3:24
10.	"Dulce Amor" (original version on Dulce Amor)	A.B.	3:36
11.	"Quiero Estar Contigo" (original version on Preciosa)	A.B.; Vela	2:31
12.	"Terco Corazón" (original version on Preciosa)	A.B.	2:46
13.	"Dime" (original version on Dulce Amor)	A.B.	2:58
14.	"Ya Se Va" (original version on Selena y Los Dinos)	Jorge A. Ramírez	3:25
15.	"Cien Años" (original version on Preciosa)	Alberto Cervantes; Rubén Fuentes; Simon Gallup; Robert Smith; Laurence Tolhurst	3:09
16.	"Quiero" (original version on Preciosa)	A.B.	3:10
Total length:			53:26

Mis Primeros Éxitos (2002 re-issue) bonus track
No.	Title	Writer(s)	Length
17.	"Spoken Liner Notes"	A.B.; Abraham; Vela; Suzette Quintanilla	4:38
Total length:			58:04

== Chart performance ==
Weekly chart performance for 16 Super Éxitos Originales
Chart (1990)	Peak position
US Regional Mexican Albums (Billboard)	22

== Works cited ==
- "Regional Mexican Albums > May 5, 1990" (PDF). Billboard. Vol. 102, no. 18. May 5, 1990.
- "Music Reviews". Latin Style (45–51). 2002. "Mis Primeros Éxitos Originally released in March of 1990 Mis Primeros Éxitos is a compilation of Selena's greatest hits before joining EMI Latin. This album was produced by AB and recorded in Weslaco, Texas, the songs here show why Selena by this time was already a star in the substantial Tejano music market. She had already been the recipient of numerous TMAs. This album presented Selena to a larger audience and the direction which the talented singer would take as a performer and trendsetter. In addition to classics like " Cien Años," the tracks included in Mis Primeros Éxitos are songs like "Tu No Sabes" In addition to classics like Cien Anos, the tracks included in Mis Primero Éxitos are songs like Tu No Sabes, by Ricky Vela, the first mariachi song recorded by Selena and an..."
- Bogdanov, Vladimir (2001). All Music Guide: The Definitive Guide to Popular Music (4th ed.). Backbeat Books. ISBN 0-87930-627-0.
- Brown, Suzanne (August 11, 2002). "Playlist". The News and Observer. p. 2G – via Newspapers.com.
- Cobo, Leila (September 14, 2002). "Vital Reissues". Billboard. Vol. 114, no. 37.
- Guerra, Joey (March 27, 2020). "Ranking Selena's albums: 'Dulce Amor' to 'Dreaming of You'". Houston Chronicle.
- Mitchell, Rick (May 5, 1995). "In life, she was the queen of Tejano music. In death, the 23-year-old singer is becoming a legend". Houston Chronicle.
- Patoski, Joe Nick (1996). Selena: Como La Flor. Little Brown and Company. ISBN 0-316-69378-2.
- Patoski, Joe Nick (October 1992). "What a Disc! The Best Texas Music-ever-on CD". Texas Monthly. 20 (10).
- Peña, Manuel (2002). Música Tejana. Texas A&M University. ISBN 978-0-89096-888-8.
- Quintanilla, Selena (2002). Mis Primero Éxitos (Media notes). A.B. Quintanilla (producer), Suzette Quintanilla (spoken liner notes producer). EMI Latin. H2H42299.
- Quintanilla, Selena (2002). Selena (Media notes). A.B. Quintanilla (producer), Suzette Quintanilla (spoken liner notes producer). EMI Latin. 724354099403.
- Quintanilla, Selena (2002). Ven Conmigo (Media notes). A.B. Quintanilla (producer), Suzette Quintanilla (spoken liner notes producer). EMI Latin.
- Stacy, Lee (2002). Mexico and the United States. New York: Marshall Cavendish. ISBN 0-7614-7402-1.
