= Éxitos y Recuerdos (Selena album) =

Greatest hits album by Selena
- Released: March 15, 1996 (U.S.)
- Recorded: 1989–1995
- Genre: Tejano, Latin pop
- Length: 28:17
- Label: EMI Latin
- Producer: Abraham Quintanilla Jr.

Selena chronology
Dreaming of You (1995)	Éxitos y Recuerdos (1996)	Siempre Selena (1996)

Éxitos y Recuerdos (English: Hits and Memories) is a greatest hits album by Mexican-American singer Selena. It was released on March 15, 1996 by EMI Latin, nearly a year after she was killed. This album has been released with different covers, and also with the name Éxitos del Recuerdos (English: Hits of the Memories), the titles were "Madacy", "Rain", "Pink", "Sun", and "Special Markets". The release with the flower shirt picture has a misspelling on the back. It reads "Come la Flor" instead of "Como la Flor".

== Track listing ==
No.	Title	Writer(s)	Length
1.	"Baila Esta Cumbia"	A.B. Quintanilla III, Pete Astudillo	2:58
2.	"Ya Ves"	A.B. Quintanilla III, Pete Astudillo	3:15
3.	"Como la Flor"	A.B. Quintanilla III, Pete Astudillo	3:03
4.	"Tengo Ganas de Llorar"	A.B. Quintanilla III, Ricky Vela	3:17
5.	"Vuelve a Mi"	A.B. Quintanilla III, Pete Astudillo	3:38
6.	"Qué Creías"	A.B. Quintanilla III, Pete Astudillo	3:31
7.	"Sukiyaki"	Rokusuke Ei, Hachidai Nakamura, A.B. Quintanilla III	3:00
8.	"Si la Quieres"	Ricky Vela	3:12
9.	"Besitos"	A.B. Quintanilla III	2:23

== Charts ==
=== Weekly charts ===
Chart (1996)	Peak position
US Top Latin Albums (Billboard)	13
US Regional Mexican Albums (Billboard)	7
