= List of Billboard Regional Mexican Albums number ones of 1996 =

The Regional Mexican Albums, published in Billboard magazine, is a record chart that features Latin music sales information for regional styles of Mexican music. This data are compiled by Nielsen SoundScan from a sample that includes music stores, music departments at department stores and verifiable sales from concert venues in the United States.

== Albums ==
Issue Date	Album	Artist	Reference
January 6	Amor Prohibido	Selena	
January 13	Amor Prohibido	Selena	
January 20	Amor Prohibido	Selena	
January 27	Amor Prohibido	Selena	
February 3	Amor Prohibido	Selena	
February 10	Amor Prohibido	Selena	
February 17	Un Millón de Rosas	La Mafia	
February 24	Un Millón de Rosas	La Mafia	
March 2	Un Millón de Rosas	La Mafia	
March 9	Un Millón de Rosas	La Mafia	
March 16	Un Millón de Rosas	La Mafia	
March 23	Un Millón de Rosas	La Mafia	
March 30	Un Millón de Rosas	La Mafia	
April 6	Un Millón de Rosas	La Mafia	
April 13	Amor Prohibido †	Selena	
April 20	Amor Prohibido †	Selena	
April 27	Amor Prohibido †	Selena	
May 4	Amor Prohibido †	Selena	
May 11	Unidos Para Siempre	Los Tigres Del Norte	
May 18	Llevame Contigo	Intocable	
May 25	Unidos Para Siempre†	Los Tigres Del Norte	
June 1	Unidos Para Siempre†	Los Tigres Del Norte	
June 8	Unidos Para Siempre†	Los Tigres Del Norte	
June 15	Unidos Para Siempre†	Los Tigres Del Norte	
June 22	Unidos Para Siempre†	Los Tigres Del Norte	
June 29	Unidos Para Siempre†	Los Tigres Del Norte	
July 6	Unidos Para Siempre†	Los Tigres Del Norte	
July 13	Unidos Para Siempre†	Los Tigres Del Norte	
July 20	Unidos Para Siempre†	Los Tigres Del Norte	
July 27	Unidos Para Siempre†	Los Tigres Del Norte	
August 3	Unidos Para Siempre†	Los Tigres Del Norte	
August 10	Unidos Para Siempre†	Los Tigres Del Norte	
August 17	Unidos Para Siempre†	Los Tigres Del Norte	
August 24	Unidos Para Siempre†	Los Tigres Del Norte	
August 31	Por Puro Amor	Limite	
September 7	Por Puro Amor	Limite	
September 14	Por Puro Amor	Limite	
September 21	Por Puro Amor	Limite	
September 28	Por Puro Amor	Limite	
October 5	Juntos Para Siempre	Los Mismos	
October 12	Juntos Para Siempre	Los Mismos	
October 19	Juntos Para Siempre	Los Mismos	
October 26	Juntos Para Siempre	Los Mismos	
November 2	Por Puro Amor †	Limite	
November 9	Partiendome El Alma	Limite	
November 16	Partiendome El Alma	Limite	
November 23	Siempre Selena	Selena	
November 30	Siempre Selena	Selena	
December 7	Siempre Selena	Selena	
December 14	Siempre Selena	Selena	
December 21	Siempre Selena	Selena	
December 28	Siempre Selena	Selena	
