= Siempre Selena =

Compilation album by Selena

Remix album / Compilation album by Selena
- Released: October 29, 1996
- Recorded: 1986–1994
- Genres: Latin pop; Tejano; Latin rock
- Length: 35:49
- Language: Spanish
- Labels: EMI Latin, Q-Productions
- Producers: A.B. Quintanilla, Nelson Gonzalez

Selena chronology
Éxitos y Recuerdos (1996)	Siempre Selena (1996)	Selena: The Original Motion Picture Soundtrack (1997)

Singles from Siempre Selena
- 1. "Siempre Hace Frio" Released: October 1996; 2. "Costumbres" Released: January 1997

Selena remix chronology
Siempre Selena (1996)	Anthology (1998)

Siempre Selena (English: Always Selena) is a compilation album by American singer Selena. It was released posthumously on October 29, 1996, jointly by EMI Latin and Q-Productions. Following strong public interest and a desire to preserve the singer's legacy, Abraham Quintanilla, Selena's father and manager, found unreleased material for Siempre Selena. The album contains unreleased recordings and remixes of previously released songs. Siempre Selena contains 10 songs ranging from tracks featured on Selena's Alpha (1986) to shelved Don Juan DeMarco (1995) soundtrack projects.

Music critics criticized Siempre Selena's abundance of slow romantic ballads, while others found its appeal in its collection of unreleased, lesser-known songs and reworked material. Siempre Selena followed the posthumously released Dreaming of You (1995) album, which debuted atop the United States Billboard 200, an unprecedented feat for a predominantly Spanish-language recording. Presales and demand from fans, as well as disc jockeys hyping its release, led music retailers to believe Siempre Selena would be another sellout. Upon its release, retailers reported modest sales, while other stores reported that sales for the album had flattened. Director of EMI Latin, Manolo Gonzalez, explained that the company intentionally did not market Siempre Selena aggressively.

Siempre Selena debuted and peaked at number one on the US Billboard Top Latin Albums and Regional Mexican Albums charts, selling 10,500 units its first week. It peaked at number 82 on the Billboard 200. Siempre Selena remained at number one for two consecutive weeks on the Top Latin Albums chart while it remained atop the Regional Mexican Albums chart for 14 consecutive weeks. Two of the album's songs were released as singles: "Siempre Hace Frío" and "Costumbres". In November 2017, the Recording Industry Association of America (RIAA) certified Siempre Selena triple platinum (Latin field), selling 180,000 album-equivalent units in the US.

== Background and production ==
On March 31, 1995, American Tejano music singer Selena was shot and killed by Yolanda Saldívar, her friend and former manager of the singer's boutiques. At the time of her death, Selena was developing a crossover album that was intended to launch her into the American pop market. The crossover album Dreaming of You was posthumously released on July 18, 1995, debuting and peaking atop the United States Billboard 200 albums chart, an unprecedented feat for a predominantly Spanish-language recording in the chart's history. Tejano music—which she had thrust into the mainstream market—experienced a decline in popularity in the wake of her death, and Tejano albums that did not bear Selena's name were struggling to sell. Writing in The Odessa American, critic Mario Taradell wrote that Abraham Quintanilla, Selena's father and manager, noted "an insatiable hunger for Selena's music". Abraham began receiving requests from fans for the singer's music and began locating recordings "that Selena recorded that we had forgotten about". Abraham explained to El Norte that Siempre Selena is a work of familial love and care, created with Selena in mind, the way the singer would have wanted. EMI Latin's president, José Behar, concurred with Abraham's statements, adding that the posthumous releases were created as if Selena had approved of them, saying the releases have a clear purpose and justification.

Following her death, Abraham stated his commitment to preserving Selena's music. Selena's brother A.B. Quintanilla, who produced her music, said Selena expressed a wish for her presence to "never go away". Siempre Selena contains unreleased recordings and remixes of previously released content. The previously released content was remastered using multitrack recording under new arrangements, produced by A.B. at Q-Productions studios. According to Q-Productions promoter Lee Garza, the technology used on Siempre Selena at the label's studios was one of only two known recording studios in the US to have the processing equipment.

== Music and lyrics ==
Siempre Selena contains 10 tracks that range from compositions present on Selena's Alpha to shelved Don Juan DeMarco (1995) soundtrack projects. The record opens with "Siempre Hace Frío", an unreleased track intended for the Don Juan DeMarco soundtrack, accompanied by the mariachi ensemble, Mariachi Sol de Mexico. The soundtrack's producers shelved Selena's contributions once Bryan Adams agreed to record material for the project. Christopher John Farley of Time magazine believed the producers regretted their decision following the impact of Selena's death. A "soulful mariachi song", "Siempre Hace Frío" lyrically tells the story of a woman's desire for her lover to return to her, despite him being with another woman. Chris Riemenschneider of the Austin American-Statesman called the track a "lazy, mournful mariachi" where Selena belts "her own special borderland blues, but she leaves little to cry at the end". Riemenschneider wrote that those who doubted Selena's musical talent should listen to "Siempre Hace Frío". He specifically pointed out Howard Stern, who mocked and poked fun at the singer's death and those who mourned her, as one of those "Selena's doubters". The following track, "Only Love", was among three other demos Selena recorded in early 1990 in hopes of securing a crossover deal. While the intent was to record pop songs, Abraham told Taradell that "Only Love" became "too adult contemporary" for them. Capitol Records urged Behar to instead grow the singer's Spanish-language profile. Taradell called "Only Love" a "faceless pop ballad", while editors of the Orlando Sentinel called it a contemporary R&B track about "whether to go on with life without the man [the singer] loves". The third track of Siempre Selena, "Soy Amiga", was written by Ricky Vela. Vela joined the group as its keyboardist and penned "Soy Amiga" for Alpha. Selena was 14 years old when she recorded "Soy Amiga"; her vocals on the track remained intact for Siempre Selena, though "the music was redone to fit today's radio sound". Taradell called it a "breezy Latin pop number". Riemenschneider was not impressed with the remastered version of "Soy Amiga", calling it a "fluffy pop song" lacking "any passion".

Along with "Soy Amiga", the following tracks: "Como Quisiera" (1988), "A Million to One" (1987), "Costumbres" (1988), and "Cien Años" (1988), were recordings released before Selena became an EMI Latin artist in 1989. "Como Quisiera", originally "a Tex-Mex tune", was remixed into a midtempo mariachi recording; lyrically, it is about a woman's affections for a guy who left her heartbroken. Mariachi Sol de Mexico provided backing vocals on "Como Quisiera", and following its release, it became a popular song. "A Million to One" was revitalized with the inclusion of saxophone, lending the song a "sensuous flavor". Riemenschneider found the tracks "Only Love" and "A Million to One" musically similar to "jazz-light" numbers that failed to convey Selena's mainstream potential. The Juan Gabriel cover, "Costumbres", was transformed into a "feisty yet palatable cumbia style" track. The new arrangements for "Costumbres" were modeled after the cumbia style found in Selena's Amor Prohibido (1994) album. According to sound engineer Brian "Red" Moore, transforming "Costumbres" from its original slow ranchera style into a faster cumbia rhythm was challenging for the engineers and producers because of its age and change of tempo. Because Abraham owned the masters of "Costumbres", the label could isolate Selena's vocals and use processing technology to adjust the pitch, restoring them to their original state. Moore explained that the technical issue was resolved, though he noted an artistic issue had arisen. Moore found "Costumbres" lacking the artistic foundation found in Selena's works and requested A.B.'s help resolving the issue, the only track on Siempre Selena that required A.B.'s assistance. The Pedro Infante track, "Cien Años", was arranged into a mariachi song.

The following songs: "No Quiero Saber" (1990), "Ya No" (1994), and "Tú Robaste Mi Corazón" (1993), were remixed. The remix version of "No Quiero Saber" on Siempre Selena was transformed in early March 1996 for the 1996 Summer Olympics Latin-themed album, Voces Unidas. Former band member Pete Astudillo re-dubbed Emilio Navaira's vocals on "Tú Robaste Mi Corazón" for Siempre Selena.

== Critical reception ==
Professional ratings
Review scores
Source	Rating
AllMusic	4/5 stars
Austin American-Statesman	3/5 stars
The Desert Sun	1/5 stars

Music critics were mixed on Siempre Selena, with some criticizing its abundance of slow romantic ballads and its close release schedule tied to the film soundtrack of Selena (1997). Positive reviews came from critics who welcomed its content of previously unreleased, rare, and remastered tracks and its overall packaging. (Note: Criticized for its abundance of slow romantic songs, its release schedule close to the soundtrack, positive reviews of its content, and overall packaging.) Taradell described Siempre Selena as "Selena's musical scrapbook". He favored its diversity and previously unreleased material, calling it "more impressive than most posthumous repackagings". Natalia Pignato and Umatilla High of the Orlando Sentinel highlighted the inclusion of unreleased recordings and remastered tracks, which displays "the bittersweet success of unfulfilled promise". AllMusic identified Siempre Selena as a "collection of rarities and lesser-known songs". John Lannert of Billboard magazine similarly described the album as having "a collection of previously unreleased English and Spanish-language tracks" with Selena's earlier repertoire of tracks "sonically touched up". Ramiro Burr wrote in his The Billboard Guide to Tejano and Regional Mexican Music (1999) that Siempre Selena contained "vocal tracks [that] were lifted and combined with different instrumental tracks". Riemenschneider wrote that the album offers "a wide and impressive range of mostly unheard music" that demonstrated Selena as the "queen of her domain". La Opinión called Siempre Selena a genre-varied album, which is emblematic of the singer's studio albums and a poignant production.

Paul Verna, a critic from Billboard magazine, called the recording a "so-so grab bag [that contains] romantic ballads". Verna believed that the tracks "is sure to appeal to [Selena's] vast and loyal legion of fans". Fred Shuster of The Desert Sun criticized the ballads for being dreary and suggested that listeners who disliked slow love songs should avoid Siempre Selena. In contrast, Verna opined that fans of Selena would "not [grow] weary of slow-paced love songs [such as] 'Como Quisiera' and 'Tú Robaste Mi Corazón'". Taradell suspected that Siempre Selena had been "timed to set up the media blitz" on the impending release of the soundtrack to the biopic. Shuster called the album "second-rate material at best", noting that it was generated towards "fans awaiting the Selena movie". AllMusic opined that Siempre Selena was "of interest to dedicated fans", noting that there was a paucity of worthwhile tracks. La Prensa de San Antonio's Chito de la Torre found the remastered tracks on Siempre Selena to be a successful use of technology on humans. In a poll conducted by News-Press, disc jockeys were asked to pick the top albums they would bring with them on a deserted island; Siempre Selena was among those chosen.

== Release ==
On October 19, 1996, it was revealed that Siempre Selena would be commercially available on October 29. The album was jointly released by EMI Latin and Q-Productions. Local music shops reported that interest in the album began as early as a few weeks before its release. Local Tejano disc jockeys further hyped the craze, predicting that the album would be "wildly popular" because of Selena's fans. Pre-sale copies and interest in the album gave music retailers high hopes, believing it would be a sellout. Roughly 500 people had pre-screened the album at Hastings Books in Midland, Texas, the night before it went on sale. Music retailers were flabbergasted that sales for the album had flattened, though they reported that sales were "modest". According to South Texas music retailers, sales for the album were considerably lower in comparison to Dreaming of You. All That Music in El Paso reportedly was "busy [in] filling the demand for [the album]", while other stores in the same area reported that "sales were slow". The album was not selling much but "a handful of copies" at a Blockbuster Music store in San Antonio. Some stores in New York sold out of Siempre Selena, though they noted a lack of long lines or customers waiting to purchase the album before the stores opened, as was the case for Dreaming of You. Local businesses predicted that sales would eventually pick up towards Christmas.

EMI Latin marketing director Manolo Gonzalez said the company intentionally went "low-key" in marketing Siempre Selena compared with Dreaming of You. Gonzalez said he wanted to be "very conservative with this album" and that EMI Latin had shipped 400,000 units throughout the United States. When Siempre Selena did not match the frenzy that followed Dreaming of You, EMI Latin's executives noted that the public response was more subdued than they anticipated. Riemenschneider called EMI Latin and the singer's family an "oxymoron" for their marketing scheme, or rather lack thereof, of Siempre Selena. Riemenschneider believed that the minimal promotion was to avoid "Selena overkill" with the soundtrack and biopic that were due in a few months. He found their move to keep promotion minimal a "mistake", calling Siempre Selena the one "Selena's caretakers should have promoted [following her death]".

"Siempre Hace Frío" was released as the lead single from Siempre Selena in September 1996. It debuted at number 21 on the US Billboard Hot Latin Songs chart on the week ending October 19. The song peaked at number two in its seventh week on the chart. "Siempre Hace Frío" won the Tejano Music Award for Song of the Year at the 1997 Tejano Music Awards. "Costumbres" was released as the second single in January 1997, debuting at number 24 on the US Billboard Hot Latin Songs chart. It peaked at number 15 on the week ending February 8. Siempre Selena won Female Regional Mexican Album of the Year at the 1997 Latin Billboard Music Awards.

== Commercial performance ==
EMI Latin executives anticipated that first-week sales for Siempre Selena could top 260,000 units, later increasing their estimates to 500,000 copies. Siempre Selena became a sleeper hit, debuting atop the US Billboard Top Latin Albums and Regional Mexican Albums chart, selling 10,500 units in its initial week. On the Billboard 200, Siempre Selena debuted and peaked at number 82. The album helped increase sales of Selena's other works, including Dreaming of You and Amor Prohibido. After two weeks at number one, Siempre Selena was displaced by Julio Iglesias' Tango album in the week ending December 7. Siempre Selena finished 1996 as the 44th best-selling Latin album of the year; her Dreaming of You album remained that year's best-selling record. After 14 consecutive weeks at number one on the Regional Mexican Albums chart, Siempre Selena was dethroned by Grupo Limite's Partiendome el Alma. In its 19th week, the album regained the number one position on the Regional Mexican Albums chart on the week ending March 29, 1997, following the release of the Selena soundtrack. On the second anniversary of the singer's death on March 31, sales of Siempre Selena jumped 48%, remaining atop the Regional Mexican Albums chart and climbing the Top Latin Albums chart to number three, a position higher than the previous week. The album remained at number one for three additional weeks before it fell from the top spot on the week ending May 10. In its quarterly recap of the top-selling Latin albums of 1997, Siempre Selena ranked third behind Enrique and Julio Iglesias' albums, respectively. The recording finished 1997 as the fourth best-selling Latin album in the US, while it finished second on the Regional Mexican Albums year-end list. In December 2002, the Recording Industry Association of America (RIAA) certified Siempre Selena platinum (Latin field) for shipments of 200,000 units in the US. The RIAA re-certified the recording as triple platinum (180,000 album-equivalent units sold) in November 2017.

== Track listing ==
No.	Title	Lyrics	Production	Length
1.	"Siempre Hace Frío" (with Mariachi Sol de Mexico, 1994; previously unreleased)	Cuco Sánchez	Jose Hernandez	3:13
2.	"Only Love" (1990; previously unreleased)	Robbie Buchanan; Mark Spiro	K.C. Porter	4:11
3.	"Soy Amiga" (1986; vocals from the Alpha sessions)	Ricky Vela	A.B. Quintanilla	3:58
4.	"Como Quisiera" (1988; vocals from the Preciosa sessions)	A.B.; Vela	A.B.	3:08
5.	"A Million to One" (1986; vocals from the Muñequito de Trapo sessions)	Phil Medley	A.B.	3:20
6.	"Costumbres" (1988; vocals from the Dulce Amor sessions)	Juan Gabriel	A.B.	3:41
7.	"Cien Años" (1988; vocals from the Preciosa sessions)	Alberto Cervantes; Rubén Fuentes; Simon Gallup; Robert Smith; Laurence Tolhurst	A.B.	3:11
8.	"Tú Robaste Mi Corazón" (with Pete Astudillo)	A.B.; Vela	A.B.	3:50
9.	"Ya No" (1994; vocals from the Amor Prohibido sessions)	A.B.; Vela	A.B.	3:41
10.	"No Quiero Saber" (1996; rendition from Voces Unidas)	A.B.; Astudillo	A.B.	3:32
Total length:				35:49

== Credits and personnel ==
Credits adapted from the liner notes of Siempre Selena.

Vocal credits

- Selena – vocals, composer
- Rebecca Valdez – background vocals
- Mariachi Sol de Mexico – background vocals
- Jessie Garcia – background vocals
- Pete Astudillo – background vocals

Instruments

- Ismael Espinoza – violin
- Miguel Guzman – violin
- Carlos Rosas – violin
- Jose M. Vargas – violin
- Rafael Garcia – trumpet
- Fabian Maltos – accordion
- Joe Posada – saxophone
- A.B. Quintanilla – bajo sexto, bass
- Ricky Vela – keyboards
- Ray Paz – keyboards
- Chris Perez – guitar
- Jesse Garcia – guitar
- Jesse Ybarra – guitar
- Henry Gomez – vihuela
- Mateo Garcia – requinto
- Brian "Red" Moore – bajo sexto, bass

Technical and production credits

- Pete Astudillo – composer
- Robbie Buchanan – composer
- Alberto Cervantes – composer
- Ruben Fuentes – composer
- Juan Gabriel – composer
- Simon Gallup – composer
- Phil Medley – composer
- Cuco Sanchez – composer
- Robert Smith – composer
- Mark Spiro – composer
- Laurence Tolhurst – composer
- Ricky Vela – composer
- A.B. Quintanilla – composer, executive producer
- Brian "Red" Moore – engineer, producer
- Nelson Gonzalez – supervisor producer

Visuals and imagery

- Paul Wenzel – art direction

== Charts ==
=== Weekly charts ===
Weekly chart performance for Siempre Selena
Chart (1996)	Peak position
US Billboard 200 (Billboard)	82
US Top Latin Albums (Billboard)	1
US Regional Mexican Albums (Billboard)	1

=== Quarterly charts ===
Quarterly chart performance for Siempre Selena
Chart (1997)	Peak position
US Top Latin Albums (Billboard)	3

=== Year-end charts ===
Year-end chart performance for Siempre Selena
Chart (1996)	Position
US Top Latin Albums (Billboard)	44
Chart (1997)	Position
US Top Latin Albums (Billboard)	4
US Regional Mexican Albums (Billboard)	2

== Certifications ==
Certification for Siempre Selena
Region	Certification	Certified units/sales
Mexico	—	14,500
United States (RIAA)	3× Platinum (Latin)	180,000^{‡}
^{‡} Sales+streaming figures based on certification alone.

== See also ==
- 1996 in Latin music
- Selena albums discography
- List of number-one Billboard Top Latin Albums from the 1990s
- List of number-one Billboard Regional Mexican Albums of 1996
- Latin American music in the United States

== Works cited ==
- "Siempre Selena > Album Review". AllMusic.
- "RIAA Gold & Platinum". RIAA.com.
- Anon. (November 6, 1996). "Posthumous Selena Release Hits Stores". Longview News-Journal – via Newspapers.com.
- Anon. (November 6, 1996a). "Interest In Latest Selena CD Spotty". Albuquerque Journal – via Newspapers.com.
- Anon. (November 7, 1996b). "Selena". The Odessa American – via Newspapers.com.
- Anon. (December 7, 1996c). "Top Latin Albums > December 7, 1996" (PDF). Billboard. Vol. 108, no. 49.
- Anon. (December 28, 1996d). "1996 Year-end Charts". Billboard. Vol. 108, no. 52.
- Anon. (October 10, 1996e). "Otro disco de Selena!". El Norte (in Spanish). ProQuest 316296418.
- Anon. (October 13, 1996f). "Siempre Selena". La Opinión (in Spanish). ProQuest 368705505.
- Anon. (October 10, 1996g). "Lanzaran este mes segundo disco postumo de Selena: 'Siempre Selena', con canciones rancheras y en ingles, saldra el 29 de octubre". La Opinión (in Spanish). ProQuest 368147447.
- Anon. (October 19, 1996h). "Hot Latin Songs > October 19, 1996". Billboard. Vol. 108, no. 42.
- Anon. (March 1, 1997). "Top Latin Albums > March 1, 1997". Billboard. Vol. 109, no. 9.
- Anon. (March 1, 1997a). "Top Latin Albums > May 10, 1997". Billboard. Vol. 109, no. 12.
- Anon. (December 27, 1997b). "1997 Year-end Charts". Billboard. Vol. 109, no. 52.
- Anon. (April 26, 1997c). "Selena Continua Vendiendo Discos". El Siglo de Torreón.
- Anon. (March 12, 1997d). "'Selena' Movie Set To Debut This Week". Victoria Advocate – via Newspapers.com.
- Anon. (May 7, 1997e). "Music News & Notes". The Philadelphia Record. ProQuest 3192701625.
- Anon. (January 25, 1997f). "Hot Latin Songs > January 25, 1997". Billboard. Vol. 109, no. 4.
- Anon. (February 8, 1997g). "Hot Latin Songs > February 8, 1997". Billboard. Vol. 109, no. 6.
- Arrarás, María Celeste (1997). Selena's Secret: The Revealing Story Behind Her Tragic Death. Simon and Schuster. ISBN 0-684-83193-7.
- Barrera, Ruben (November 8, 1996). "Nuevo disco de Selena genera poco interes entre fanaticos". El Diario La Prensa (in Spanish). ProQuest 368500066.
- Burr, Ramiro (1999). The Billboard Guide to Tejano and Regional Mexican Music. Billboard Books. ISBN 0-8230-7691-1.
- Camarena, Ricardo (March 11, 1997). "Banda sonora de 'Selena' es 'el gran final'". La Opinión (in Spanish). ProQuest 368203367.
- Cline, Damon (March 12, 1997). "Selena Movie Soundtrack Hits Stores". The Odessa American – via Newspapers.com.
- Cobo, Leila (January 25, 2003). "RIAA Latin Certifications for December". Billboard. Vol. 115, no. 4.
- Cole, Patrick E.; Farley, Christopher John (July 10, 1995). "Old Rock, New Life". Time. Vol. 140, no. 2.
- de la Torre, Chito (January 12, 1997). "Chito's Spotlights". La Prensa (in Spanish). ProQuest 368655245.
- Garcia, Ricky; Gamboa, Suzanne (March 15, 2022). "New digitally modified Selena music announcement gets mixed reviews online". KXAN-TV.
- Ibarra, Alvaro (March 2021). "Sueño en Paño". Latino Studies. 19 (1). doi:10.1057/s41276-021-00283-x. ProQuest 2502075465.
- Jasinski, Laurie E. (2012). Handbook of Texas Music. Texas A&M University Press. ISBN 978-0-87611-297-7.
- Lannert, John (September 13, 1997). "Year to Date Latin Music charts". Billboard. Vol. 109, no. 37.
- Lannert, John (April 12, 1997a). "Latin Notas". Billboard. Vol. 109, no. 15.
- Lannert, John (March 29, 1997b). "Top Latin Albums > March 29, 1997". Billboard. Vol. 109, no. 13.
- Lannert, John (March 23, 1996c). "Latin Notas". Billboard. Vol. 108, no. 12.
- Lannert, John; Verna, Paul (November 23, 1996). "Album Reviews". Billboard. Vol. 108, no. 47.
- Patoski, Joe Nick (1996). Selena: Como La Flor. Little Brown and Company. ISBN 0-316-69378-2.
- Marini, Richard A. (July 8, 2022). "Tejano star Shelly Lares is retiring — sort of". San Antonio Express-News.
- Mendoza, Madalyn (March 14, 2022). "Quintanilla family is releasing new Selena album nearly 30 years after the Tejano icon's death". Houston Chronicle.
- Minnick, Doug (September 24, 2010). "José Behar, President EMI Latin". Taxi A&R. Archived from the original on January 30, 2015.
- Paul, Maria Luisa (March 15, 2022). "More 'Bidi Bidi Bom Bom' to come: Selena's father announces new album nearly 27 years after the singer's death". The Washington Post.
- Pereira, Miriam (January 17, 1997). "DJs Spin Personal Favorites". News-Press – via Newspapers.com.
- Pignato, Natalie; High, Umatilla (January 10, 1997). "Selena, Siempre Selena". Orlando Sentinel – via Newspapers.com.
- Edward James Olmos (narrator), Jose Behar (executive producer), Abraham Quintanilla (executive producer), Claribel Cuevas (associate producer), Randal J. Edwards (associate producer), Ila von Hasperg (editor), Jeffrey Coulter (producer), Cecelia Miniucchi (director) (April 1, 1997). Selena Remembered (Documentary). EMI Latin Productions, Q-Productions.
- Riemenschneider, Chris (November 9, 1996). "'Siempre Selena' Proves Singer's Range of Talent". Austin American-Statesman – via Newspapers.com.
- Schone, Mark (April 20, 1995). "A Postmortem Star In death, Selena is a crossover success". Newsday.
- Shuster, Fred (December 15, 1996). "Sound Judgement". Detroit Free Press – via Newspapers.com.
- "Trial on E". The Los Angeles Times. October 19, 1996 – via Newspapers.com.
- Stavans, Ilan; Augenbraum, Harold (2005). Encyclopedia Latina: History, Culture, And Society In The United States (4th ed.). Grolier Academic Reference. ISBN 0-7172-5815-7.
- Taradell, Mario (November 7, 1996). "'Siempre Selena' A Musical Scrapbook". The Odessa American – via Newspapers.com.
- Taradell, Mario (November 9, 1996a). "Selena's Second Posthumous Album, 'Siempre'". The Journal News – via Newspapers.com.
- Taradell, Mario (March 4, 1997). "13-year-old Pena named top female entertainer at 17th Tejano awards". Las Vegas Review-Journal. ProQuest 259989243.
- Untiedt, Kenneth L. (2013). Cowboys, Cops, Killers, and Ghosts: Legends and Lore in Texas. University of North Texas Press. ISBN 978-1-57441-532-2.
- Verhovek, Sam Howe (April 1, 1995). "Grammy-Winning Singer Selena Killed in Shooting at Texas Motel". The New York Times. Archived from the original on July 20, 2016.
- "Selena Album Sales Modest". The Odessa American. November 7, 1996 – via Newspapers.com.
