= Cien Años =

1953 song by Ruben Fuentes and Alberto Cervantes

"Cien Años" (English: "One Hundred Years") is a song written by Mexican songwriters Rubén Fuentes and Alberto Cervantes. It was originally recorded in 1953 by Pedro Infante, who also performed the song in the 1954 film Cuidado con el amor in a famous scene where his character sings it for Elsa Aguirre's character. The song, which went on to become the most successful song of 1954 in Mexico, has been covered by at least 189 performers according to the Mexican Society of Authors and Composers.

In the lyrics of the song, a man describes an encounter with an old love, who passes by him and ignores him as the man laments that she has forgotten him, but in spite of her indifference, he remarks that "if I live a hundred years, a hundred years I'll think of you".

== Selena version ==
"Cien Años"

Single by Selena

from the album All My Hits/Todos Mis Éxitos Vol. 2
- Released: 2000
- Recorded: 1988 and 1990; Hollywood, California
- Genre: Pop, Latin pop, Dance, Tejano, Mariachi
- Length: 3:36 (2000 version)
- Label: EMI Records
- Songwriter: Fuentes-Cervantes
- Producers: Jose Behar, A.B. Quintanilla III

Selena singles chronology
"Rancheras Sampler" (1998)	"Cien Años" (2000)	"Con Tanto Amor Medley" (2002)

Tejano singer Selena also made her personal cover, which has been included in most of Selena's releases since its original 1988 release. The song was covered by Selena's singing group in 1988, Selena y Los Dinos, on their album Preciosa (Precious). Selena re-recorded the song with a more beat-to-beat pop style in 1990, for their first greatest hits album, 16 Super Éxitos Originales. After Selena's death, the song appeared as a Mariachi song for the album Siempre Selena in 1996. Again the song appeared on Selena's greatest hits album, All My Hits/Todos Mis Éxitos Vol. 2 in 2000.

== Other versions ==
- Vicente Fernandez
- Thalía
- Pepe Aguilar
- Los Tigres del Norte
- Los Cenzontles & David Hidalgo (2008)
- Lucero
- Krystal
- Carlos Rivera and Maluma
- José Feliciano
- Natalia Lafourcade and Pepe Aguilar

== See also ==
- List of top-ten songs for the 1950s in Mexico
