= Siempre hace frío =

1956 ranchera song written by Cuco Sánchez

Song by Cuco Sánchez
- A-side: "Un corazón olvidado"
- Released: 1956
- Genre: Ranchera
- Label: Columbia
- Songwriter: Cuco Sánchez

"Siempre hace frío" (It's Always Cold) is a ranchera song written by Mexican singer-songwriter Cuco Sánchez in 1956. Sánchez first recorded it as a 45-rpm single for the Mexican record label Columbia. His recording features guitarist Antonio Bribiesca and harpist Benito Martínez. That same year Flor Silvestre sang it in the film La justicia del gavilán vengador, which was released in 1957.

Around the same time, Verónica Loyo and Amalia Mendoza recorded their own versions with the Mariachi Vargas de Tecalitlán for RCA Víctor.

== Linda Ronstadt version ==
Linda Ronstadt recorded the song for her album Mas Canciones (1991).

== Selena version ==
"Siempre Hace Frío"

Single by Selena

from the album Siempre Selena
- Released: January 27, 1996
- Recorded: 1994–1995
- Genre: Tejano; Mariachi
- Length: 3:14
- Label: EMI Latin
- Songwriter: Cuco Sanchez
- Producer: José Hernàndez

Selena singles chronology
"I'm Getting Used to You" (1996)	"Siempre Hace Frío" (1996)	"No Quiero Saber" (1996)

Selena's version has the title "Siempre Hace Frío" and is the first single released from the Siempre Selena album. The song was recorded in late 1994 for the soundtrack of Don Juan DeMarco (1995). Unused on the soundtrack it was then included on the album Siempre Selena. The song was a hit single. It stayed at #2 on the Hot Latin Tracks Chart for 8 weeks. It won Song of the Year at the 17th annual Tejano Music Awards in 1997.

=== Chart performance ===
Chart (1996)	Peak position
US Hot Latin Songs (Billboard)	2
US Regional Mexican Songs (Billboard)	2
Mexico Ranchero (El Siglo de Torreón)	2
