= Selena Remembered =

1997 American documentary film

Video by Selena
- Released: April 1, 1997 (VHS); January 25, 2005 (DVD/CD)
- Recorded: 1996
- Studio: Corpus Christi, Texas
- Genre: Biopic
- Length: 60 minutes
- Language: English
- Label: EMI Latin, Q-Productions
- Director: Cecilia Miniucchi
- Producer: Edward James Olmos, Abraham Quintanilla Jr

Selena DVD chronology
Selena (1997)	Selena Remembered (1997)	Live! The Last Concert (2007)

Selena Remembered is a 1997 American direct-to-video documentary film about Mexican-American Tejano singer Selena who died in 1995. directed by Cecilia Miniucchi, it was released on April 1, 1997 on VHS and on January 25, 2005 on DVD with a greatest hits album by Selena on CD. The documentary features Edward James Olmos narrating special moments and triumphs that helped Selena and her band, Selena y Los Dinos, into superstardom in North America. The DVD's logo Her Life, Her Music, and Her Dream are featured on both the DVD and CD covers.

== Track listing ==
=== Documentary ===
VHS (1997)/DVD (2005)

#	Title	Length
1	"Music Legend"	3:08
2	"The Beginning"	5:28
3	"Tejano Superstar"	4:09
4	"The Label Deal"	4:03
5	"Evolution"	3:39
6	"Entre a Mi Mundo"	8:24
7	"The Breakthrough"	4:47
8	"Amor Prohibido"	12:14
9	"Selena's World"	3:36
10	"Dreaming of You"	7:42

=== Album ===
Selena Remembered

Greatest hits album by Selena
- Released: January 25, 2005
- Recorded: 1989–1995
- Genre: Tejano, cumbia, Latin pop
- Length: 48:42
- Label: EMI Latin
- Producer: A.B. Quintanilla III, Abraham Quintanilla Jr, Bebu Silvetti, Guy Roche, Keith Thomas

Selena chronology
Momentos Intimos (2004)	Selena Remembered (2005)	Unforgettable (2005)

Selena Remembered is a greatest hits album by Mexican-American singer Selena. It was released on January 25, 2005 by EMI Latin as part of a CD/DVD set which includes the 2005 DVD release of the 1997 documentary Selena Remembered.

CD (2005)
No.	Title	Writer(s)	Length
1.	"Techno Cumbia"	A.B. Quintanilla III, Pete Astudillo	3:47
2.	"Como la Flor"	A.B. Quintanilla III, Pete Astudillo	3:05
3.	"Baila Esta Cumbia"	A.B. Quintanilla III, Pete Astudillo	2:58
4.	"Dame Un Beso"	A.B. Quintanilla III, Ricky Vela	3:54
5.	"Ven Conmigo"	A.B. Quintanilla III, Pete Astudillo	2:29
6.	"La Carcacha"	A.B. Quintanilla III, Pete Astudillo	4:11
7.	"No Debes Jugar"	A.B. Quintanilla III, Ricky Vela	2:51
8.	"La Llamada"	A.B. Quintanilla III, Ricky Vela	3:13
9.	"Amor Prohibido"	A.B. Quintanilla III, Pete Astudillo	2:51
10.	"Bidi Bidi Bom Bom"	Selena Quintanilla, Pete Astudillo	3:30
11.	"No Me Queda Más"	Ricky Vela	3:20
12.	"Fotos y Recuerdos"	Chrissie Hynde, Ricky Vela	2:36
13.	"Dreaming of You"	Franne Golde, Tom Snow	5:14
14.	"I Could Fall in Love"	Keith Thomas	4:39
Total length:			48:42

Notes

- "Dame Un Beso" is the 1990 re-recorded version by Selena which was released on 16 Super Exitos Originales (1990). The original 1985 recording by Selena y Los Dinos was released on Alpha (1986).
