= Como Te Quiero Yo A Ti =

"Como Te Quiero Yo a Ti"

Single by Selena

from the album Momentos Intimos, Moonchild Mixes
- Released: March 2004; July 29, 2022
- Studio: AMEN Studios
- Genre: Mariachi, ballad
- Length: 3:09
- Label: WEA Latina
- Songwriter: Ricky Vela
- Producers: Manny Guerra; A. B. Quintanilla

Selena singles chronology
"Soy Amiga (A. B. Quintanilla III Remix)" (2016)	"Como Te Quiero Yo a Ti" (2004)

"Como Te Quiero Yo a Ti" ("How I Love You") is a song by American singer Selena, originally from her fifth indie release, Preciosa (1988). It was released as a single on Momentos Intimos (2004) and Moonchild Mixes (2022). Written by Ricky Vela, the song debuted and peaked at number six on the US Billboard Latin Digital Song Sales chart following its release from Moonchild Mixes.

== Chart performance ==
Weekly chart performance for "Como Te Quiero Yo a Ti"
Chart (2022)	Peak position
US Latin Digital Song Sales (Billboard)	6

== Works cited ==
- "Latin Digital Song Sales > August 13, 2022". Billboard.
