= Guerra de Estados Pesados =

2000 compilation album of Norteño music

Compilation album by Various artists
- Released: March 21, 2000
- Genre: Norteño music
- Length: 44:33
- Label: Lideres

Various artists chronology
Guerra de Estados Pesados (2000)	Guerra de Estados Pesados, Vol. 2 (2001)

Guerra de Estados Pesados (Heavy State War) is a compilation album, which compiles music from performers from six different states of Mexico: Sinaloa, Sonora, Nayarit, Zacatecas, Nuevo León and Durango. This album peaked at number one in the Billboard Top Latin Albums chart for one week and dropped to number 16 the following week.

== Track listing ==
Track listing
No.	Title	Band/Artist	Length
1.	"100% Cabrón" (Sinaloa)	Los Herederos Del Norte	2:32
2.	"Regalo Caro" (Sonora)	Chuy Vega	3:33
3.	"El Imagen" (Zacatecas and Nayarit)	El Jilguero Y El Original	2:22
4.	"Reten De La Sierra" (Nayarit)	El Original	3:34
5.	"Cargamento del Chivero" (Nayarit)	El Original	3:01
6.	"La Fuga Del Moreno" (Sinaloa)	El Marquez De Sinaloa	3:08
7.	"El Elotero" (Durango)	Los Gatilleros De Durango	4:12
8.	"Clave 7" (Sonora)	Chuy Vega	3:23
9.	"Sinaloense De Corazon" (Sinaloa)	Los Herederos Del Norte	2:23
10.	"Reina de Reinas" (Durango)	Los Gatilleros De Durango	3:04
11.	"Mil Kilos" (Nuevo León)	Los Comandantes De Nuevo León	3:33
12.	"La Bella Juanita" (Sonora)	Chuy Vega	4:11
13.	"454" (Sinaloa)	Los Herederos Del Norte	2:38
14.	"El Yoyo" (Nuevo León)	Los Comandantes De Nuevo León	2:59

== Chart performance ==
Chart (2000)	Peak position
US Billboard Top Latin Albums	1
US Billboard Regional/Mexican Albums	1
US Billboard 200	122

== Sales and certifications ==
Region	Certification	Certified units/sales
United States (RIAA)	Platinum (Latin)	100,000^{^}
^{^} Shipments figures based on certification alone.
