= Costumbres =

Song by Juan Gabriel

Single by Rocío Dúrcal

from the album Canta A Juan Gabriel Volumen 6
- A-side: "Jamas Te Prometí un Jardin de Rosas"
- Released: 1985
- Studio: Beto Albarrán Studios
- Genre: Ranchera
- Label: Ariola
- Songwriters: Juan Gabriel and Rocío Dúrcal
- Producer: Juan Gabriel

"Costumbres"

Single by Selena

from the album Siempre Selena
- Released: March 9, 1996
- Recorded: September 1989
- Studio: AMEN Studios (San Antonio, TX)
- Genre: Latin
- Length: 3:40
- Label: EMI Latin
- Songwriter: Juan Gabriel
- Producer: AB Quintanilla III

Selena singles chronology
"No Quiero Saber" (1996)	"Costumbres" (1996)	"A Boy Like That" (1996)

Alternative cover

"Costumbres" (Habits) is a song written and produced by Juan Gabriel and performed by Spanish singer Rocío Dúrcal. It was recorded for her studio album Canta A Juan Gabriel Volumen 6. The song was released by Ariola Records in 1985, as a B-side to "Jamas Te Prometí un Jardin de Rosas".

== Selena version ==
In 1988, Selena y los Dinos covered "Costumbres" in their album Dulce Amor. It was the third and final single released from the album. Selena re-recorded the song in 1990 for her album "16 Super Exitos Originales", a compilation album looking back at her hits prior to signing a record deal with Capitol EMI Latin. It was then later included on Siempre Selena in a remix version. The track was released as a single in late 1996.

=== Chart performance ===
Chart (1996)	Peak position
U.S. Billboard Hot Latin Tracks	15
U.S. Billboard Latin Regional Mexican Airplay	13

== La India version ==
"Costumbres"

Single by La India

from the album Sobre el Fuego
- Released: 1998
- Genre: Salsa
- Length: 5:51
- Label: RMM
- Songwriter: Juan Gabriel
- Producer: Isidro Infante

La India singles chronology
"I Love the Nightlife" (1998)	"Costumbres" (1998)	"Hielo" (1999)

In 1997, Puerto Rican-American singer La India covered the song on her album, Sobre el Fuego as her third single from the album. La India's cover became a success, reaching on the Top Ten Hot Latin Tracks peaking on #8.

=== Chart performance ===
Chart (1998)	Peak position
U.S. Billboard Hot Latin Tracks	8
U.S. Billboard Latin Tropical/Salsa Airplay	4
