= No Quiero Saber =

Single by Selena

from the album Voces Unidas
- Released: June 20, 1996
- Recorded: 1990
- Studio: Zaz Studios (San Antonio, TX)
- Genre: Dance-pop; Latin pop
- Length: 2:54 (original version); 3:43 (remix version)
- Label: EMI Latin
- Songwriters: A.B. Quintanilla III; Pete Astudillo
- Producer: A.B. Quintanilla III

Selena singles chronology
"Siempre Hace Frio" (1996)	"No Quiero Saber" (1996)	"Costumbres" (1997)

Music video
- "No Quiero Saber" on YouTube

"No Quiero Saber" (English "I Don't Want to Know") is a song recorded by American recording artist Selena. It was originally a track on her second studio album Ven Conmigo (1990). It was composed and produced by her brother, A.B. Quintanilla III. Pete Astudillo, a backup singer with Selena y Los Dinos, produced the song with Quintanilla. The recording was later remixed by Quintanilla III for Selena's 1996 first remix album, Siempre Selena. It was released posthumously by EMI Latin in June 1996, as the album's second single, behind "Siempre Hace Frio".

The track was given positive reviews by music critics, with the Deseret News calling it one of Selena's best songs. After its inclusion on her second remix album as a bonus acoustic track on Enamorada de Ti (2012), critics gave a mixed review. The song won the Tejano Crossover Song of the Year award posthumously at the 1997 Tejano Music Awards. It peaked at number six on the US Billboard Hot Latin Tracks chart, while peaking within the top 20 on the Latin Regional Mexican Airplay chart and the Latin Pop Airplay.

== Background and release ==
"No Quiero Saber" was written and produced by A.B. Quintanilla III, Selena's brother and principal record producer. Pete Astudillo, a backup singer with Selena y Los Dinos, co-wrote the song with Quintanilla III. It was composed for Selena's second studio album Ven Conmigo (1990), and was mixed by Brian "Red" Moore, a family friend. Quintanilla III later remixed the recording, for a release on Selena's first remix album, Siempre Selena (1996). The track was featured on the official Latin album of the 1996 Summer Olympics, Voces Unidas, which was headed by EMI Latin. The song was released as the second single from Siempre Selena in June 1996, behind "Siempre Hace Frio".

== Critical response ==
The Deseret News named "No Quiero Saber" as one of Selena's "best works". Stephen Thomas Erlewine from Allmusic, named "No Quiero Saber" as one of "Tejano's hit" tracks while reviewing the various artists album Tejano Heavy Hitters (1997). "No Quiero Saber" won the Tejano Crossover Song of the Year award posthumously at the 1997 Tejano Music Awards.

In 2012, "No Quiero Saber" was released as an acoustic bonus track for Selena's second remix album, Enamorada de Ti. Joey Guerra of the San Antonio Express-News wrote that the bonus acoustic recordings are "unlikely highlights, the new instrumentation gives them all a nice edge and highlights Selena's burgeoning vocal prowess". Domingo Banda of the Semana News, gave a more positive approach and listed them as recommended tracks and believed they are reminiscent of live Selena recordings.

== Chart performance ==
"No Quiero Saber" debuted at number 35 on the US Billboard Hot Latin Tracks on the issue dated 11 May 1996. It peaked at number six on the week of 22 June 1996. On the week of 1 June 1996, the recording debuted at number 12 on the Latin Pop Airplay chart, and peaked at number 10 four weeks later on the week of 29 June 1996. On the Latin Regional Mexican Airplay chart, "No Quiero Saber" debuted at number 20 on the week of 15 June 1996. The following week, it peaked at number 15.

Chart (1995)	Peak position
US Billboard Hot Latin Tracks	6
US Billboard Latin Pop Airplay	10
US Billboard Latin Regional Mexican Airplay	15

== Credits and personnel ==
Credits are taken from the single's liner notes.

- Vocals by Selena
- Written and composed by A.B. Quintanilla III, Pete Astudillo
- Produced by A.B. Quintanilla III
- Arranging by A.B. Quintanilla III
- Keyboards by Roland Gutierrez, Cruz Martínez
- Programming by Roland Gutierrez, Cruz Martínez
- Mixing by Brian "Red" Moore, A.B. Quintanilla III
- Engineering by Brian "Red" Moore
- Recording by Brian "Red" Moore
- Sequencing by Roland Gutierrez, Cruz Martínez
