= Only Love (Engelbert Humperdinck/Selena song) =

Single by Selena

from the album Selena (soundtrack)
- Released: 1997
- Recorded: 1989
- Genre: Latin
- Length: 4:12
- Label: EMI
- Songwriter(s): Robbie Buchanan, Mark Spiro
- Producer(s): Abraham Quintanilla Jr.

"Only Love" is a song written by Camilo Sesto, Robbie Buchanan and Mark Spiro and it was first recorded by Engelbert Humperdinck sometime in between the 1970s and 1980s. It was later recorded by the Tejano singer Selena in 1989 and was not released until 1996 on her tribute album Siempre Selena, and then again on the Selena movie soundtrack a year later in 1997, following Selena's death in 1995. The song was to be developed for her English crossover album or remain a simple unreleased song.

== Covers ==
- Selena recorded this song in 1989, and presumably performed the song during her Ven Conmigo Tour but no live performances of this song can be found on YouTube.

== Tribute Covers ==
Millie Corretjer recorded a slight Spanish cover of Selena's rendition of the song called "Solo Tu" and released it on her 1995 album Sola.
