= Don Juan DeMarco =

- Theatrical release poster
- Directed by: Jeremy Leven
- Written by: Jeremy Leven
- Based on: "Don Juan DeMarco and the Centerfold" by Jeremy Leven; Don Juan by Lord Byron
- Produced by: Francis Ford Coppola; Fred Fuchs; Patrick Palmer
- Starring: Marlon Brando; Johnny Depp; Faye Dunaway; Rachel Ticotin; Bob Dishy; Géraldine Pailhas
- Cinematography: Ralf D. Bode
- Edited by: Tony Gibbs
- Music by: Michael Kamen
- Production company: American Zoetrope
- Distributed by: New Line Cinema
- Release dates: October 21, 1994 (ShowEast); April 7, 1995 (United States)
- Running time: 97 minutes
- Country: United States
- Languages: English; Spanish
- Budget: $25 million
- Box office: $69 million

Don Juan DeMarco is a 1994 American romantic comedy-drama film starring Johnny Depp as John Arnold DeMarco, a man who believes himself to be Don Juan, the greatest lover in the world. Clad in a cape and domino mask, DeMarco undergoes psychiatric treatment with Marlon Brando's character, Dr. Jack Mickler, to cure him of his apparent delusion, but the psychiatric sessions have an unexpected effect on the psychiatric staff, some of whom find themselves inspired by DeMarco's delusion; the most profoundly affected is Dr. Mickler himself, who rekindles the romance in his complacent marriage.

The movie is based on two different sources; the modern-day story is based on director/screenwriter Jeremy Leven's short story "Don Juan DeMarco and the Centerfold" (the movie's original title before the studio changed it shortly before release), while the flashbacks depicting DeMarco's back-story are based on the more familiar legend of Don Juan, especially as told by Lord Byron in his version of the legend.

Depp received the London Film Critics Circle Award for Actor of the Year, along with his performance in Ed Wood, while the film's theme song, "Have You Ever Really Loved a Woman?", co-written and performed by Bryan Adams, was nominated for the Oscar, Grammy, and Golden Globe Award for Best Original Song.

== Plot ==
John Arnold DeMarco is a 21-year-old who dresses like Zorro, with a mask, hat and cape, and claims to be Don Juan. After a passionate affair, he decides to commit suicide. At the site of the billboard of a masked model from which he plans to jump, psychiatrist Jack Mickler dissuades him by posing as Don Octavio de Flores. John is then held for a ten-day review in a mental institution.

Mickler, who is about to retire, insists on doing the evaluation and conducts it without medicating the youth. He listens to John's story as Don Octavio: Don Juan was born in Mexico, he has an affair with his school tutor which ultimately leads to the death of his father in a swordfight. Mickler listens to the story while spotting inconsistencies, such as his Castilian accent, but continues to go along with it.

At home, Mickler's marriage to his wife Marilyn lacks passion. As Mickler notices that John's presence at the institution is having an impact on the staff – both distracting the women and dancing with a male attendant on the lawn – he finds himself being influenced, and starts listening to opera in his house and rekindling the passion with Marilyn.

Eventually Mickler meets with John's grandmother, who tells him that John grew up in Phoenix, Arizona, and that his father, "The Dance King of Astoria", died in a car crash. When Mickler returns to the institution and confronts his patient with this information, John dismisses his grandmother as misanthropic and of making up the backstory.

In response Mickler recounts the story of an insecure young man who fell in love with a woman in a magazine, who then contacted her and was told she never wanted to speak to him again. When John asks what happened to the young man, Mickler tells him he tried to commit suicide.

As the ten days tick down, pressure mounts on Mickler to support the youth's indefinite confinement, a decision which he is skeptical of. John has mentioned that his mother became a nun and remains in the convent to this day, and in a subsequent meeting with John, Mickler suggests that John's mother could have possibly had affairs, to which John responds with violent anger.

John concludes his story, about how he was kept two years in a harem as the lover of the sultaness, before finding true love and being rejected on a remote Greek island by his one true love, Doña Ana. Mickler tells him at the story's end that he believes John is Don Juan DeMarco, the greatest lover the world has ever known. When John asks Mickler who he is, he says "I am Don Octavio de Flores" and that he has seen through all of his masks.

At the end of the ten days, Mickler is able to convince John to take his medication, and makes him understand that not everyone believes he is Don Juan. Right before his retirement, Mickler and John meet with the board, with John in street clothes. He speaks with an American accent, and acknowledges that he was born in Queens, his father was killed in a car accident, and that his mother was unfaithful to his father, so entered a convent in Mexico.

John is released and accompanies Mickler, along with his wife Marilyn, to the remote island of Eros that Don Juan has described where he met his true love Ana. The older couple dance on the beach, while John connects with someone in the distance.

== Cast ==
- Marlon Brando as Dr. Jack Mickler/Don Octavio de Flores
- Johnny Depp as John Arnold DeMarco/Don Juan
- Faye Dunaway as Marilyn Mickler
- Rachel Ticotin as Doña Inez
- Bob Dishy as Dr. Paul Showalter
- Géraldine Pailhas as Doña Ana
- Talisa Soto as Doña Julia
- Marita Geraghty as Woman in Restaurant
- Richard C. Sarafian as Detective Sy Tobias
- Tresa Hughes as Grandma DeMarco
- Gilbert Lewis as Judge Ryland
- Franc Luz as Don Antonio
- Carmen Argenziano as Don Alfonzo
- Jo Champa as Sultana Gulbeyaz
- Stephen Singer as Dr. Bill Dunsmore
- Tom Mardirosian as Baba the Eunuch
- "Tiny" Lister Jr. as Rocco Compton
- Esther Scott as Nurse Alvira

Other notable appearances include Al Corley as the woman in the restaurant's date, Nick La Tour as the doorman Nicholas, and Bill Capizzi and Patricia Mauceri as characters in John's story, the sultan and Doña Querida. Selena also makes a brief appearance as a singer; this was her first and only film appearance before her murder on March 31, 1995, seven days prior to the film's release.

== Music ==
The film features the original Bryan Adams song, "Have You Ever Really Loved a Woman?"; the lyrics incorporate quotes from Depp's character, and the melody is used as a musical motif throughout the film. In addition, the song itself is performed three times, once by Selena and a mariachi band serenading the characters in Spanish, once by José Hernández and Nydia, as background music (again in Spanish), and once by Bryan Adams during the closing credits. The song is also available on the soundtrack. The song was nominated for an Oscar for Best Original Song at the 68th Academy Awards, but lost to "Colors of the Wind" from Pocahontas.

Selena recorded other songs for the soundtrack, including "El Toro Relajo" and "Siempre Hace Frio". The score was composed, orchestrated and conducted by Michael Kamen, and was performed by the London Metropolitan Orchestra.

Tori Amos and Michael Stipe recorded a duet for the film called "It Might Hurt a Bit" but it remains unreleased.

== Release ==
=== Box office ===
The film had an estimated budget of $25 million, grossing just $22,150,451 in the U.S. With a total $68,592,731 gross worldwide, it was considered a success for New Line Cinema. Upon its opening weekend, Don Juan DeMarco opened at #4 with $4,556,274 behind the openings of Bad Boys and A Goofy Movie, and the second weekend of Tommy Boy.

=== Critical response ===
On Rotten Tomatoes the film has an approval rating of 72% based on reviews from 39 critics, with an average rating of 6.2/10. The site's consensus was "Don Juan DeMarco proves that a slight story can translate to entertaining cinema if it's acted out by a pair of well-matched professionals enjoying their craft." On Metacritic, the film has a score of 63 out of 100 based on reviews from 19 critics, indicating "generally favorable" reviews. Audiences surveyed by CinemaScore gave the film a grade "A−" on scale of A+ to F.

Janet Maslin of The New York Times wrote: "It benefits not only from Mr. Brando's peculiar presence, but also from Johnny Depp, who again proves himself a brilliantly intuitive young actor with strong ties to the Brando legacy. The movie is cheesy, but its stars certainly are not." Roger Ebert of the Chicago Sun-Times gave the film 2 out of 4, and wrote "Brando doesn't so much walk through this movie as coast, in a gassy, self-indulgent performance no one else could have gotten away with."

== See also ==
- The Brave, a film which Depp directed and in which he again acted alongside Brando
