= José Hernández (musician) =

Mexican mariachi musician (born 1958)

José Hernàndez
- Born: José Hernàndez; 27 August 1958 (age 68); Mexicali, Mexico
- Genres: Mariachi, World Music
- Occupations: Musician, Arranger, Composer, Singer and Educator
- Instruments: Trumpet, Vocals, Guitar, Vihuela, Guitarron, Violin
- Years active: 1976–present
- Website: https://www.mariachisoldemexico.com/

José L. Hernández (born 27 August 1958) is a Mexican mariachi musician.

Hernández is the youngest of eight children (Esteban and Maria Eva Hernández, parents). He is the founder of Mariachi Sol de Mexico and also Mariachi Reyna de Los Angeles, America's first all-female professional mariachi ensemble.

== Career ==
Hernández has worked with many famous musicians in Latin music, including Selena, Luis Miguel, Linda Ronstadt, Vicente Fernández and Lola Beltrán.

He is a mariachi leader in the United States and is recognized internationally as an innovative force behind mariachi music over the last thirty years, both musically as well as in mariachi education.

He immigrated to the United States when he was four years old and spent his youth growing up in Pico Rivera, California. He began to sing aged four and played trumpet in his school's music program at age ten. His interest in music eventually led him to study arranging and composition at the Grove School of Music in Hollywood 1979 to 1982.

Hernández is owner of the Mexican cuisine restaurant Casa del Sol in Tustin, California (formerly Cielito Lindo Restaurant in South El Monte, California), established in 1986.

In 1991 he founded the Mariachi Heritage Society, a non-profit organization whose purpose is to teach mariachi music to children. Over 7,000 young people have been served through this successful music program.

Hernández married Teresa Alicia in 1979, and they have four children: Karina born in 1986, Melody born in 1991, and twins Cristian and Crystal born in 2000. His daughter Melody is following in her father's footsteps by pursuing a career in music. He also has a son, Alex Estrada, who is the singer of the band Silver Snakes.

He received a Grammy nomination in 2001 for Tequila con Limon. Among others, he has arranged and produced recordings for Vikki Carr, Jose Feliciano, and Shaila Durcal

José Hernández serves as a mariachi education consultant for Music Education Consultants, Inc. Through the Conn-Selmer Company, Hernández has developed the Bach Stradivarius Trumpet LR19043B, released at the NAMM Show in January 2013. Since 2012 he has operated the Summer Institute for performers.

Mariachi Sol de Mexico continue to tour and have performed throughout Europe, Asia and Latin America.

Jose Hernández and Mariachi Sol de Mexico have played on film scores for Seabiscuit, The Wonderful Ice-Cream Suit (1998), Old Gringo (1989), American Me (1992), Don Juan de Marco, A Million to Juan (1994), Glory Road (2006), Beverly Hills Chihuahua (2008, 2011, 2012) and Rango (2011).
