= Selena Live! The Last Concert =

2000 live album by Selena

Live! The Last Concert

Live album by Selena
- Released: March 27, 2001; June 23, 2017 (re-release)
- Recorded: February 26, 1995
- Venue: Astrodome
- Genre: Tejano
- Length: 55:52
- Label: EMI Latin (first and second editions); Universal Music Latin Entertainment (digital and re-release)
- Producer: A.B. Quintanilla

Selena chronology
All My Hits: Todos Mis Éxitos Vol. 2 (2000)	Live! The Last Concert (2001)	Ones (2002)

Selena re-release chronology
Lo Mejor de...Selena (2015)	Live! The Last Concert (2017)	Selena: The Series Soundtrack (2020)

Live: The Last Concert DVD
- DVD cover

Professional ratings
Review scores
Source	Rating
AllMusic	3/5 stars

Selena Live! The Last Concert is a live album by American singer Selena. It was recorded on February 26, 1995, at the Houston Astrodome and was televised live on Univision. The album was posthumously released by EMI Latin on March 27, 2001. The singer shared the concert with Tejano singer Emilio Navaira and performed to 66,994 people, which broke the previous attendance record held by Selena the previous year. The concert was critically acclaimed for outperforming ticket sales by country music singers Vince Gill, Reba McEntire, and George Strait. Selena's performance at the Astrodome became her final televised concert before she was shot and killed on March 31, 1995.

At the time of her performance, journalists gave the singer rave reviews, citing the range of material performed, as well as Selena's "sultry, and sensual" choreography. Critics have since regarded the concert as one of her best performances—it was dramatized by Jennifer Lopez in the 1997 biopic film. The purple jumpsuit worn during the performance—on display in a museum the singer's family operates in Corpus Christi, Texas—continues to be a popular halloween costume for children and adults.

The set list mostly included material from her Amor Prohibido (1994) album and a medley mashup of disco music songs "I Will Survive", "Funkytown", "Last Dance", "The Hustle", and "On the Radio", by Gloria Gaynor, Lipps Inc., and Van McCoy respectively, while "Last Dance" and "On the Radio" were originally performed by Donna Summer. The album peaked atop the US Billboard Latin Pop Albums chart, becoming the singer's second number one on the chart since Dreaming of You (1995). It earned the singer a nomination for Pop Album of the Year, Female at the 2002 Billboard Latin Music Awards.

== DVD release ==
Live: The Last Concert was released on DVD on September 2, 2003, by Image Entertainment and Q-Productions, Inc.

Among the features contained in the DVD, the viewer is allowed to select from two different main menus, Spanish or English, in order to change the language of the biography and menu. With a running time of 99-minutes, the DVD features a biography of the singer and an additional 44-minute behind-the-scenes look at the making of Selena (1997). The DVD chapter listing is identical to the album track listing with the exception of the spoken liner notes.

== Track listing ==
No.	Title	Writer(s)	Length
1.	"Disco Medley" (I Will Survive/Funkytown/Last Dance/The Hustle/On the Radio)	Frederick Perren, Dino Fekaris, Steve Greenberg, Paul Jabara, Van McCoy, Donna Summer, Giorgio Moroder	7:44
2.	"Amor Prohibido"	Selena Quintanilla, A.B. Quintanilla, Pete Astudillo	2:06
3.	"Baila Esta Cumbia"	A.B., Astudillo	3:12
4.	"Tus Desprecios"	A.B., Ricky Vela	2:29
5.	"Cobarde"	José Luis Borrego	1:57
6.	"Techno Cumbia"	A.B., Astudillo	3:45
7.	"La Carcacha"	A.B., Astudillo	6:47
8.	"No Me Queda Más"	Vela	3:37
9.	"Bidi Bidi Bom Bom"	Selena, Astudillo	4:13
10.	"Si Una Vez"	A.B., Astudillo	3:26
11.	"El Chico del Apartamento 512"	A.B., Vela	3:16
12.	"Ya Ves"	A.B., Astudillo	2:48
13.	"Como la Flor"	Selena, A.B., Astudillo, Vela	6:45

== Charts ==
=== Weekly charts ===
Chart (2001)	Peak position
US Billboard 200	176
US Top Latin Albums (Billboard)	2
US Latin Pop Albums (Billboard)	1
Chart (2017)	Peak position
US Top Album Sales (Billboard)	74
US Catalog Album Sales (Billboard)	13

== Certifications and sales ==
Region	Certification	Certified units/sales
United States (RIAA)	5× Platinum (Latin)	300,000^{‡}
^{‡} Sales+streaming figures based on certification alone.

== Bibliography ==
- "2002 Billboard Latin Music Awards winners and nominees". Billboard. Associated Press. May 10, 2002.
- Fernandez, Celia (November 3, 2015). "WAGS Star Nicole Williams Dressed Up As Selena — Did She Pull It Off?". Latina.
- Patoski, Joe Nick (1996). Selena: Como La Flor. Boston: Little Brown and Company. ISBN 0-316-69378-2.
- Moreno, Carolina (October 23, 2015). "26 Ways To Channel Selena And Look 'Como La Flor' This Halloween". Huffington Post.
- Burr, Ramiro (February 12, 1995). "Rodeo watershed show for Navaira". San Antonio Express-News.
- Perry, Claudia (January 10, 2017). "Selena turns in sultry, sensual performance at Dome". Houston Chronicle.
- "Selena Live The Last Concert DVD". Amazon.com.
- Colloff, Pamela (April 2010). "Dreaming of Her". Texas Monthly. Archived from the original on August 18, 2016.
- Jackson, La (2014). Musicology 2102: A Quick Start Guide to Diverse Synergies. L.A. Jackson. ISBN 978-0-578-15469-5.
- Paredez, Deborah (2009). Selenidad: Selena, Latinos, and the Performance of Memory. Duke University Press. ISBN 978-0-8223-9089-3.
- Jennifer Lopez, Edward James Olmos, Jon Seda, Jackie Guerra (March 21, 1997). Selena (DVD). Warner Bros. Event occurs at 127 minutes.
- Clark, Michael (March 25, 2005). "Ten years after her murder, Selena lives on". Houston Chronicle. Archived from the original on September 25, 2015.
