= Álvaro Torres discography =

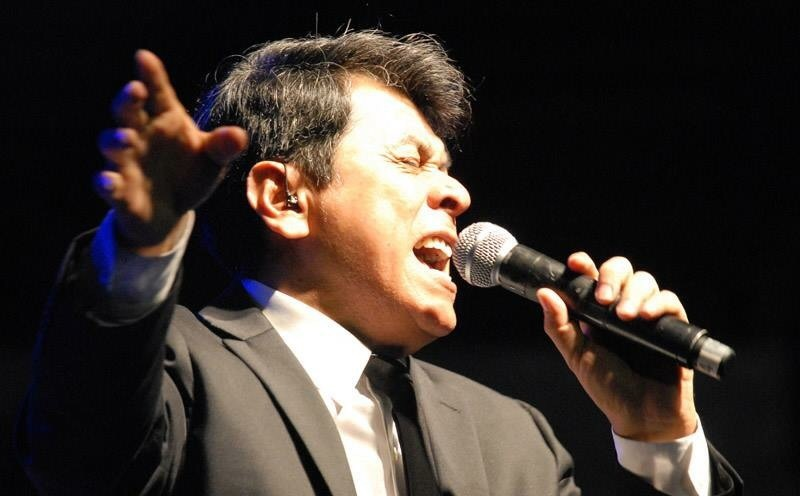
- Studio albums: 20
- Singles: 33

Salvadoran singer Álvaro Torres has released twenty studio albums, thirty-three singles and several compilation albums.

In December 1975, Torres began the recording of his first production entitled Algo Especial, which began to be heard on broadcasters throughout the country. In 1977, Torres moved to Guatemala and recorded four studio albums: Acaríciame, Qué Lástima, De Qué Me Sirve Quererte and Ángel de Ternura. In 1983 he moved to United States and recorded Sin Cadenas in 1984 and Tres in 1985.

Then he recorded Más Romántico Que Nadie in 1987, Si Estuvieras Conmigo in 1990 y Nada Se Compara Contigo in 1991. In the 1990s, Torres recorded Homenaje a México (1992), Amor del Alma (1993), Reencuentro (1995) which included the hit "Patria Querida/Reencuentro" as a duet with Barrio Boyzz. The song is widely regarded as a second anthem for El Salvador, particularly among Salvadorans living abroad., En Busca del Amor (1996) y El Último Romántico (1998). In 2009, Torres released his first Christian album Muy Personal and in 2016 he released Otra Vida.

== Albums ==
=== Studio albums ===
List of studio albums, with selected chart positions
Title	Details	Peak chart positions
Title	Details	US Latin Pop Albums
Algo Especial	Released: 1976; Label: DILA Records; Formats: vinyl	—
Acaríciame	Released: 1977; Label: Codiscos; Formats: vinyl	—
Qué Lástima	Released: 1978; Label: DILA Records; Formats: vinyl	—
De Qué Me Sirve Quererte	Released: 1979; Label: DILA; Formats: vinyl	—
Ángel de Ternura	Released: 1981; Label: DILA; Formats: vinyl	—
Sin Cadenas	Released: 1984; Label: InnerCat Music Group; Formats: vinyl	—
Tres	Released: 1985; Label: Fonovisa Records; Formats: vinyl	4
Más Romántico Que Nadie	Released: 1987; Label: WEA Records; Formats: vinyl	8
Si Estuvieras Conmigo	Released: May 15, 1990; Label: EMI Capitol Latin; Formats: CD, vinyl	5
Nada Se Compara Contigo	Released: November 19, 1991; Label: EMI Capitol Latin; Formats: CD, vinyl	2
Homenaje a México	Released: November 17, 1992; Label: EMI Capitol Latin; Formats: CD, vinyl	—
Amor del Alma	Released: September 21, 1993; Label: EMI Capitol Latin; Formats: CD, vinyl	—
Reencuentro	Released: March 7, 1995; Label: EMI Capitol Latin; Formats: CD, vinyl	—
En Busca del Amor	Released: April 30, 1996; Label: EMI Capitol Latin; Formats: CD	—
El Último Romántico	Released: February 10, 1998; Label: EMI Capitol Latin; Formats: CD	—
Amante de la vida	Released: 2000; Label: Fonovisa Records; Formats: CD	—
Mal Acostumbrado	Released: September 17, 2002; Label: Fonovisa Records; Formats: vinyl	—
Interpreta a Juan Gabriel En Bolero	Released: February 15, 2005; Label: Ole Music; Formats: CD	—
Muy Personal	Released: October 20, 2009; Label: Dig Dream Christian Music, Indie Extreme, Big Dream; Formats: CD, streaming	—
Otra Vida	Released: April 22, 2016; Label: Inner Cat Music Group; Formats: streaming	—
"—" denotes items which were not released in that country or failed to chart.

== Singles ==
=== As lead artist ===
List of singles, with selected chart positions, showing year released and album name
Title	Year	Peak chart positions			Certifications	Album
Title	Year	US Hot Latin Tracks	US Latin Airplay	US Latin Pop Airplay	Certifications	Album
"Minerva"	1978	—	—	—		De Qué Me Sirve Quererte
"Mi Amor Por Ti" (with Marisela)	1985	—	—	—		Tres
"De Punta a Punta"	1986	—	—	—		Tres
"Tres"	1986	47	—	—		Tres
"Hazme Olvidarla"	1987	7	—	—		Más Romántico Que Nadie
"Amor Que Mata"	1987	19	—	—		Más Romántico Que Nadie
"Adicto"	1988	40	—	—		Más Romántico Que Nadie
"Por lo Mucho Que Te Amo"	1989	29	—	—		Más Romántico Que Nadie
"Ni Tú Ni Ella"	1990	3	—	—		Si Estuvieras Conmigo
"Si Estuvieras Conmigo"	1990	9	—	—		Si Estuvieras Conmigo
"Mi Verdadero Amor"	1990	13	—	—		Si Estuvieras Conmigo
"Nada Se Compara Contigo"	1991	1	—	—		Nada Se Compara Contigo
"Buenos Amigos" (with Selena)	1992	1	—	—	RIAA: Gold (Latin)	Nada Se Compara Contigo
"He Vivido Esperando Por Ti"	1992	4	—	—		Nada Se Compara Contigo
"Te Olvidaré"	1992	11	—	—		Nada Se Compara Contigo
"Te Dejo Libre"	1992	4	—	—		Nada Se Compara Contigo
"Cruz de Olvido"	1992	31	—	—		Homenaje a México
"Me Arrepiento de Quererte"	1993	28	—	—		Homenaje a México
"Estoy Enamorado de Ti"	1993	19	—	—		Nada Se Compara Contigo
"Que Lástima"	1993	7	—	—		Amor del alma
"Ángel Caído"	1993	7	—	—		Amor del alma
"Tu Mejor Amigo"	1994	11	—	—		Amor del alma
"Contigo Sí"	1994	17	—	—		Amor del alma
"Reencuentro" (feat. Barrio Boyzz)	1995	11	11	3		Reencuentro
"Al Acecho"	1995	—	—	13		Reencuentro
"Stress"	1996	—	—	—		En Busca del Amor
"El Último Romántico"	1997	12	12	5		El Último Romántico
"Puede ser"	1998	—	—	19		El Último Romántico
"Te Recordaré Por Siempre"	1998	—	—	—		El Último Romántico
"No Me Vuelvo a Enamorar"	2005	—	—	30		Interpreta a Juan Gabriel en Bolero
"Sería Perfecto"	2013	—	—	—		Otra Vida
"Cuando Te Hago Mía"	2014	—	—	—		Otra Vida
"De Corazón a Corazón" (feat. Jafet)	2017	—	—	—		Non-album single
"Me Extrañarás" (with Lenier)	2019	—	—	—	RIAA: Gold (Latin)	Melisma
"La Más Bella Historia de Amor" (feat. Andrés Ángel)	2019	—	—	—		Non-album single
"—" denotes items which were not released in that country or failed to chart.

=== As featured artist ===
List of singles, showing year released and album name
Title	Year	Album
"Soñar No Es Ilegal" (Mister Meli feat. Álvaro Torres)	2019	Sueños Ilegales - The Film
