= Barrio Boyzz discography =

The Barrio Boyzz discography
- Studio albums: 7
- Compilation albums: 5
- Singles: 14
- Music videos: 4
- Holiday albums: 1
- Other charted songs: 1

The discography of American Latin rap band The Barrio Boyzz consists of seven studio albums, five compilation albums, one holiday album, fourteen singles and four music videos. The Barrio Boyzz was formed in 1991 by Joe Jacket, who proposed creating a mainstream Latino group. They auditioned for chairman of EMI Records, Charles Koppelman, who signed the group to its sister label SBK Records. The group's debut album, Crazy Coolin' (1992), failed to make any impact on music charts, but its lead single "Muy Suavemente" peaked at number 36 on the US Billboard Hot Latin Tracks chart. Their second studio album, Donde Quiera Que Estes (1994) reached the top 20 on Billboard's Latin charts. The album spawned three singles; "Cerca De Ti" and "Te Amaré", which peaked at number one and number 16 on the Hot Latin Tracks, respectively. The titular single, a duet with American Tejano pop singer Selena, peaked at number one and was logged atop the Hot Latin Tracks chart for six consecutive weeks.

In 1995, The Barrio Boyzz released their third studio album, Una Vez Más. The recording peaked within the top 15 on the Top Latin Albums and Latin Pop Albums chart. Four singles released from Una Vez Mas; "Eres Asi", "Eres Mi Verdad", "No Me Dejes" and the title track, all reached the top 10 on the Latin Pop Airplay chart. The Barrio Boyzz's released Navidad, Tu y Yo (1995), their first holiday-themed recording, which did not chart. In the same year, How We Roll (1995), an English-language crossover-attempt, failed to acquire any chart success while its two singles; "I Wish" and the song of the same name charted on the Hot R&B/Hip-Hop Singles & Tracks at number 48 and 86, respectively.

Also in 1995, Barrio Boyzz collaborated with Salvadoran singer Álvaro Torres on "Patria Querida/Reencuentro", featured on Torres' album Voces Unidas. The song became a beloved anthem for Latin American communities abroad, particularly among Salvadorans living outside their home country.

The official Latin album of the 1996 Summer Olympics, Voces Unidas (1996), was distributed by EMI Latin and included the Barrio Boyzz recording "Una Nacion", which peaked at number 10 on the Latin Pop Airplay chart. Ven a Mi (1997), the group's fifth studio album, peaked at number nine on the Latin Pop Albums chart and number 23 on the Top Latin Albums chart. The two singles from the album, "Se Me Fue Mi Vida" and "Rico" attained top 20 positions on Latin charts on Billboard magazine. 12 Super Exitos, the second compilation album to be released by the Barrio Boyzz, was released in 1997. The track, "Una Noche De Amor", which was not released as a physical single, hovered the top 10 on the Hot Latin Tracks chart.

After being in hiatus for three years, the Barrio Boyzz released their sixth studio album, Destiny, in 2000 under their label Barrio Soul and Barrio Records. The only single, "Quiero Saber Que Es Amor" peaked at number 40 on the Latin Tropical Airplay chart. This was followed by their third compilation album, Best of the Barrio Boyzz (2000), which did not have chart success. The Barrio Boyzz' final album, Destino (2001), was commercially unsuccessful and soon after its initial release, they disbanded. A number of compilation albums followed without any chart success, Sólo Lo Mejor: 20 Exitos (2002), Latin Classics (2003) and Los Romanticos (2007).

== Albums ==
=== Studio albums ===
List of studio albums, with selected chart positions
Title	Album details	Peak chart positions	
Title	Album details	US TLA	US LPA
Crazy Coolin'	Released: 1992; Label: SBK Records; Format: LP, cassette, CD	—	—
Donde Quiera Que Estés	Released: 1993; Label: SBK Records; Format: LP, cassette, CD	15	7
Una Vez Más	Released: 7 March 1995; Label: SBK Records; Format: LP, Cassette, CD	12	3
How We Roll	Released: November 1995; Label: SBK Records; Format: LP, cassette, CD	—	—
Ven a Mí	Released: 1997; Label: EMI Latin; Format: Cassette, CD	23	9
Destiny	Released: 17 October 2000; Label: Barrio Soul / Barrio Records; Format: Cassette, CD	—	—
Destino	Released: 2001; Label: Fonovisa Records; Format: Cassette, CD	—	—
"—" denotes items which were not released in that country or failed to chart.

=== Compilation albums ===
List of compilation albums
Title	Album details
Navidad, Tú y Yo	Released: 5 September 1995; Label: EMI Latin; Format: LP, cassette, CD
12 Súper Éxitos	Released: 23 September 1997; Label: EMI Latin; Format: LP, cassette, CD
The Best of the Barrio Boyzz	Released: 2 October 2000; Label: EMI Latin; Format: Cassette, CD
Sólo Lo Mejor: 20 Exitos	Released: 9 April 2002; Label: EMI Latin; Format: Cassette, CD
Latin Classics	Released: 19 August 2003; Label: EMI Latin; Format: CD
Los Románticos	Released: 15 January 2007; Label: EMI Latin; Format: CD

== Songs ==
=== Singles ===
List of singles, with selected chart positions, sales and certifications
Title	Year	Peak chart positions				Sales	Certifications	Album
Title	Year	US TLS	US LPA	US TS	US Hip-Hop	Sales	Certifications	Album
"Muy Suavemente"	1992	36	—	—	—			Crazy Coolin'
"Cerca De Ti"	1993	1	—	—	—			Donde Quiera Que Estés
"Una Noche De Amor"	1994	6	—	—	—			Donde Quiera Que Estés
"Te Amaré"	1994	16	13	—	—			Donde Quiera Que Estés
"Donde Quiera Que Estés" (featuring Selena)	1994	1	1	—	—	US: 100,000^{1}	RIAA: Gold	Donde Quiera Que Estés
"Reencuentro"(Álvaro Torres feat. Barrio Boyzz)	1995	11	3	—	—			Reencuentro
"Una Vez Mas"	1995	5	2	8	—			Una Vez Más
"No Me Dejes"	1995	16	7	15	—			Una Vez Más
"How We Roll"	1995	—	—	—	48			How We Roll
"Eres Mi Verdad"	1995	22^{2}	9	—	—			Una Vez Más
"I Wish"	1996	—	—	—	86			How We Roll
"Eres Asi"	1996	14	3	—	—			Una Vez Más
"Se Me Fue Mi Vida" (with Rikarena)	1997	—	—	19	—			Ven a Mí
"Rico"	1997	24	6	—	—			Ven a Mí
"Quiero Saber Que Es Amor"	2001	—	—	40	—			Destino
"—" denotes items which were not released in that country or failed to chart.

=== Other charted songs ===
List of other songs, with selected chart positions
Title	Year	Peak chart positions		Album
Title	Year	US LPA	US TS	Album
"Una Nación"	1996	10	19	Voces Unidas
"—" denotes items which were not released in that country or failed to chart.

== Music videos ==
List of music videos, with year they were released and directors
Title	Year	Director(s)
"Muy Suvamente"	1992	
"Donde Quiera Que Estes"(featuring Selena)	1994	
"How We Roll"	1995	
"Rico"	1996	

== Notes ==
1. United States sales figures for "Donde Quiera Que Estés" as of 2000.
2. English version.
