= Voces Unidas =

Studio album by EMI Latin

Studio album by Various artists
- Released: 14 May 1996
- Genre: Latin pop; Pop
- Length: 1:05:11
- Label: EMI Latin

Singles from Voces Unidas
- 1. "Puedes Llegar" Released: 1996; 2. "Un Mundo Nuevo" Released: 1996; 3. "Así Como Hoy" Released: 1996; 4. "No Quiero Saber" Released: June 20, 1996

Voces Unidas is a studio album recorded by several famous Latin artists for the Olympic Games "Atlanta 1996", released on May 14, 1996 through EMI Latin. The album was a success, reaching the fifth place in the Billboard Latin 50 chart.

== Background ==
In early 1996, Emilio Estefan and EMI Latin president José Behar planned to bring together the most important Spanish-speaking artists and create material for the upcoming Olympic Games, as a reaction to several English-speaking artists that were preparing their albums for the Olympic Games. Estefan and Behar had a conversation about the project with Atlanta Olympic Games committee, among them marketing vice-president Lous Wayne Cunningham. Behar said "Hispanics, in Latin America and Spain, have different cultures and customs, but there is something spiritual that unites us, and that is the language".

After the Olympic Games committee agreed, Estefan started the recording of the album, although they didn't do it in the same studio, each artist recorded his or her song separately. Among the producers are included Marc Anthony, Emilio Estefan, Christian Walden and Oscar Mediavilla. Also some of the locations of recording include Miami, New York City, Los Angeles and Rio de Janeiro.

Moreover, Emilio was chosen to produce "Reach", the official theme song of 1996 Summer Olympic Games, and it gained a huge exposure thanks to Gloria Estefan's performance of the song at the Olympics closing ceremony.

== Promotional singles ==
Emilio produced "Puedes Llegar", a Spanish version of Gloria Estefan's "Reach", which was recorded by several artists: Gloria Estefan, Jon Secada, Julio Iglesias, Placido Domingo, Roberto Carlos, Jose Luis Rodríguez, Patricia Sosa, Alejandro Fernández, Ricky Martin and Carlos Vives. "Puedes Llegar" was released as a promotional single and reached the position 2 on Billboard Hot Latin Tracks chart in June 1996. Finally, "Puedes Llegar" was included as the opening track for EMI Latin's Voces Unidas, the official Spanish-speaking album for 1996 Olympic Games.

Jon Secada's "Un Mundo Nuevo" was also released that same year as a promotional single. Selena's "No Quiero Saber" was released as a single on June 20, 1996, reaching the six position in the Billboard Hot Latin Tracks chart. Marc Anthony's "Así Como Hoy" was released as a single and reached the position 13 in the Billboard Hot Latin Tracks chart.

== Track listing ==
No.	Title	Writer(s)	Artist	Length
1.	"Puedes Llegar"	Gloria Estefan, Diane Warren	Gloria Estefan, Jon Secada, Julio Iglesias, Placido Domingo, Roberto Carlos, Jose Luis Rodríguez, Patricia Sosa, Alejandro Fernández, Ricky Martin, Carlos Vives	4:13
2.	"Una Nación"	Marco Flores	Barrio Boyzz	4:17
3.	"Con La Antorcha en La Mano"	K.C. Porter	Pandora	4:57
4.	"No Quiero Saber" (remix version; originally appeared on Ven Conmigo)	A.B. Quintanilla III, Pete Astudillo	Selena	3:42
5.	"Llama Eterna"	Raúl Di Blasio, Clay Ostwald	Raúl Di Blasio	4:19
6.	"Banderas"	K.C. Porter	India	4:52
7.	"Sueños de Gloria"	Christian de Walden, Max Di Carlo	Marta Sánchez	3:53
8.	"Uno Entre Mil" (live from Estudios San Ángel, Ciudad De Mexico/1995; originally appeared on Uno Entre Mil)	Francesco Migliacci, R Fia	Mijares	3:50
9.	"Por Siempre Unidos"		Ednita Nazario, Emilio Navaira, Graciela Beltrán	4:34
10.	"Un Mundo Nuevo"	Flavio "Kike" Santander	Jon Secada	4:40
11.	"Será Entre Tú Y Yo"	Marcos Flores	Paulina Rubio	4:22
12.	"Así Como Hoy"	Omar Alfanno	Marc Anthony	5:03
13.	"Todo Es Posible"	A.B. Quintanilla III, Pete Astudillo	Thalía	4:46
14.	"Reencuentro" (originally appeared on Reencuentro)	Álvaro Torres	Álvaro Torres feat. Barrio Boyzz	4:58
15.	"Nunca Es Tarde Para Amar"	Juan Forcada	Patricia Sosa	4:45
Total length:				1:05:11

== Charts ==
Chart (1996)	Peak position
US Billboard Latin 50	5
US Latin Pop Albums (Billboard)	5
