= Reencuentro =

Reencuentro may refer to:

- Reencuentro (José José album)
- Reencuentro (Álvaro Torres album)
  - Reencuentro (song)

== See also ==
- Reencuentros, a 1994 album by Yuri
