= Una Vez Más =

Una Vez Más (Spanish: "Once More") may refer to:

- Una Vez Más, a 1995 album by the Barrio Boyzz

- "Una Vez Más" (The Barrio Boyzz song), the lead single from the album

- "Una Vez Más" (Leslie Shaw song), a single by Leslie Shaw
- Una Vez Más (Calle Ciega album), a 2006 album by Venezuelan group Calle Ciega
- "Una Vez Más", a 1982 song by Juan Gabriel
- "Una Vez Más", a 2014 song by Víctor Manuelle
