= List of number-one Billboard Hot Latin Tracks of 1992 =

This is a list containing the Billboard Hot Latin Tracks number-ones of 1992.

Issue date	Song	Artist(s)	Ref.
January 4	"Amor Mío, ¿Qué Me Has Hecho?"	Camilo Sesto	
January 11	"Amor Mío, ¿Qué Me Has Hecho?"	Camilo Sesto	
January 18	"Amor Mío, ¿Qué Me Has Hecho?"	Camilo Sesto	
January 25	"Inolvidable"	Luis Miguel	
February 1	"Inolvidable"	Luis Miguel	
February 8	"Inolvidable"	Luis Miguel	
February 15	"Inolvidable"	Luis Miguel	
February 22	"Inolvidable"	Luis Miguel	
February 29	"Si Piensas, Si Quieres"	Roberto Carlos and Rocío Dúrcal	
March 7	"Nada Se Compara Contigo"	Álvaro Torres	
March 14	"Nada Se Compara Contigo"	Álvaro Torres	
March 21	"Mi Mayor Necesidad"	Los Bukis	
March 28	"Mi Mayor Necesidad"	Los Bukis	
April 4	"Mi Mayor Necesidad"	Los Bukis	
April 11	"Mi Mayor Necesidad"	Los Bukis	
April 18	"No Sé Tú"	Luis Miguel	
April 25	"No Sé Tú"	Luis Miguel	
May 2	"No Sé Tú"	Luis Miguel	
May 9	"No Sé Tú"	Luis Miguel	
May 16	"No Sé Tú"	Luis Miguel	
May 23	"No Sé Tú"	Luis Miguel	
May 30	"No Sé Tú"	Luis Miguel	
June 6	"Buenos Amigos"	Selena and Álvaro Torres	
June 13	"Torero"	José Luis Rodríguez El Puma and Julio Iglesias	
June 20	"Torero"	José Luis Rodríguez El Puma and Julio Iglesias	
June 27	"Desde El Día Que Te Fuiste"	Pandora	
July 4	"Otro Día Más Sin Verte"	Jon Secada	
July 11	"Otro Día Más Sin Verte"	Jon Secada	
July 18	"Otro Día Más Sin Verte"	Jon Secada	
July 25	"Otro Día Más Sin Verte"	Jon Secada	
August 1	"Otro Día Más Sin Verte"	Jon Secada	
August 8	"Evidencias"	Ana Gabriel	
August 15	"Evidencias"	Ana Gabriel	
August 22	"Evidencias"	Ana Gabriel	
August 29	"Evidencias"	Ana Gabriel	
September 5	"Evidencias"	Ana Gabriel	
September 12	"Evidencias"	Ana Gabriel	
September 19	"Evidencias"	Ana Gabriel	
September 26	"Evidencias"	Ana Gabriel	
October 3	"Evidencias"	Ana Gabriel	
October 10	"Evidencias"	Ana Gabriel	
October 17	"El Centro de Mi Corazón"	Chayanne	
October 24	"El Centro de Mi Corazón"	Chayanne	
October 31	"Ángel"	Jon Secada	
November 7	"Ángel"	Jon Secada	
November 14	"Ángel"	Jon Secada	
November 21	"Ángel"	Jon Secada	
November 28	"Ángel"	Jon Secada	
December 5	"Ángel"	Jon Secada	
December 12	"Para Que Te Quedes Conmigo"	Daniela Romo	
December 19	"Castillo Azul"	Ricardo Montaner	
December 26	"Castillo Azul"	Ricardo Montaner	
