= De Punta a Punta =

1986 song by Álvaro Torres

Single by Álvaro Torres

from the album Tres
- Released: 1986
- Recorded: 1985
- Studio: George Tobin Studios (North Hollywood, CA)
- Genre: Pop
- Length: 3:25
- Label: Fonovisa Records
- Songwriter(s): Álvaro Torres
- Producer(s): Enrique Elizondo

Álvaro Torres singles chronology
"Mi Amor Por Ti" (1985)	"De Punta a Punta" (1986)	"Tres" (1986)

Music video
- "De Punta a Punta" on YouTube

"De Punta a Punta" (From End to End) is a single by Salvadoran singer Álvaro Torres released on 1986 through Fonovisa Records as part of Torres' seventh studio album Tres. The song was written by Torres, produced by Enrique Elizondo and it was recorded in George Tobin Studios, North Hollywood, CA. "De Punta a Punta", along with "Mi Amor Por Ti" where the most successful songs of his album Tres.

At the beginning, "De Punta a Punta" was not well received by some audiences because of the lyrics content, which depicts an erotic encounter between a man and a woman. Later, some people realize about the song potential, among them radio host Betty Pino, who raised the popularity of the song in United States and Latin America.

"De Punta a Punta" was covered by José Luis Rodríguez in 1990 for his album Esta Vez. His version peaked at number 34 on the Billboard Hot Latin Songs chart.

== Track listing ==
7" single 45-01065
No.	Title	Writer(s)	Length
1.	"De Punta a Punta"	Álvaro Torres	3:25
2.	"Yo Te Amo"	Álvaro Torres	3:50

== Personnel ==
Credits adapted from Tres liner notes.

Vocals

- Álvaro Torres – lead vocals

Musicians

- David White – arrangements

Production

- Enrique Elizondo – production
- Alan Hirshberg – engineering

Recording

- Recorded at George Tobin Studios, North Hollywood, CA
