= Donde Quiera Que Estés =

Single by Selena and the Barrio Boyzz

from the album Donde Quiera Que Estés
- Released: January 22, 1994
- Recorded: 1993 (New York City)
- Genre: Dance pop; hip hop
- Length: 4:25 (Spanish version); 4:30 (English version)
- Label: EMI Latin
- Songwriters: K. C. Porter; Miguel Flores; Desmond Child
- Producers: A.B. Quintanilla III; Domingo Padilla; Bebu Silvetti

The Barrio Boyzz singles chronology
"Cerca de Ti" (1993)	"Donde Quiera Que Estés" (1994)	"Te Amaré" (1994)

Selena singles chronology
"La Llamada" (1993)	"Donde Quiera Que Estés" (1994)	"Amor Prohibido" (1994)

Music video
- "Donde Quiera Que Estés" on YouTube

"Donde Quiera Que Estés" (English: "Wherever You Are") is a duet recorded by American Latin pop quintet the Barrio Boyzz and American Tejano singer Selena. Released on the Barrio Boyzz' album of the same name, "Donde Quiera Que Estés" was written by K. C. Porter, Miguel Flores, Desmond Child, and produced by A.B. Quintanilla III, Domingo Padilla and Bebu Silvetti. The lyrics explore feelings felt after a breakup between first-time lovers who hope that their love will one day return. "Donde Quiera Que Estés" is a dance pop song with influences from hip-hop music.

Before the recording sessions, the Barrio Boyzz and Selena were unaware of each other until EMI Latin acquainted them to record the song. After filming the music video for the song in New York, the Barrio Boyzz and Selena went on a mini-tour throughout Texas and Mexico. The song peaked at number one on the U.S. Billboard Hot Latin Songs chart for six consecutive weeks. It eventually became the sixth most performed Latin song of 1994 in the United States. "Donde Quiera Que Estés" was nominated for Vocal Duo of the Year at the 1994 Tejano Music Awards. The song was a critical success with music journalist favoring its musical composition.

== Background and production ==
"Donde Quiera Que Estés" was written by American music producers K. C. Porter, Miguel Flores, and Desmond Child for EMI Latin's project. The record company wanted the Barrio Boyzz and Selena to record the tune, the two were unaware of each other and were acquainted to record the song. Selena's sister and drummer of Selena y Los Dinos, Suzette Quintanilla said in a 2002 interview that "[the other company] were like 'well who is Selena?' and vice versa 'who is the Barrio Boyzz?', we weren't too familiar with them." Selena flew to New York with her mother Marcella Quintanilla to record and film the song with the Barrio Boyzz. The song was produced by Selena's brother–record producer A.B. Quintanilla, American hip-hop producer Domingo Padilla, and Argentine musician and producer Bebu Silvetti. The song was included in the 1993 sophomore album of the same name by the Barrio Boyzz, the album was later certified platinum (Latin field) for shipments of 100,000 units in the United States. According to El Salvador (El Mundo), Jose Behar, then-president of EMI Latin, initially wanted to expand the Barrio Boyzz and Selena's exposure from two different regions of the United States where they were relatively unknown.

On March 31, 1995, Selena was shot and killed by Yolanda Saldívar, her friend and former manager of the singer's Selena Etc. boutiques. At the time of her death, Selena was working on a crossover album that marketed her as an American solo pop artist. The Barrio Boyzz were asked to re-record the song into a bilingual duet with Selena entitled "Wherever You Are". The song was added to the track listing of Dreaming of You (1995), which was later certified 35× platinum (Latin field) for shipments of 3.5 million units in the United States.

== Composition and chart history ==
"Donde Quiera Que Estés" (1994)
A 30-second sample of "Donde Quiera Que Estés" by the Barrio Boyzz and Selena, where the chorus is heard.

"Donde Quiera Que Estés" is a Spanish-language dance pop song with influences of hip-hop music. It is performed in a moderate groove with a tempo of 90 beats per minute. Both the Spanish and English versions are performed in B minor and make use of scat singing, and the musical instruments used in the recording are the piano and drums. The lyrics explore feelings of a couple's ending relationship, though both hope that their love will soon return.

The song was released onto U.S. radios on 22 January 1994 and debuted at number 20 on the U.S. Billboard Hot Latin Songs chart on the week ending 5 February 1994. The song jumped to number six in the second week and to number three on the following week. John Lannert of Billboard called "Donde Quiera Que Estés" a "fast-climbing" song and predicted it—along with Los Fugitivos' song "La Loca"—to have outperform Ana Gabriel's chart topper "Luna" in the following week. The song fell to number four on the week ending 26 February 1994, it reclaimed the third position the following week for two consecutive weeks. On 26 March 1994, "Donde Quiera Que Estés" peaked at number one on the chart and remained atop the chart for six consecutive weeks. This gave the Barrio Boyzz their second consecutive number one song, with their first being "Cerca de Ti" which peaked at number one on the week ending 18 December 1993. "Donde Quiera Que Estés" provided Selena her first number one song in two years, her first number one was "Buenos Amigos" with Alvaro Torres, which peaked at number one on 6 June 1992. "Donde Quiera Que Estés" knocked Gloria Estefan's "Mi Buen Amor", which was logged atop the chart for two consecutive weeks.

In its fourth week at number one, "Donde Quiera Que Estés" scored a "commanding point bulge" and its score at the time didn't seem to be diminishing. In its fifth week, Lannert pointed out that La Mafia's "Vida" song was vastly approaching the number one spot, but he predicted that the song would remain at number one for one more week.

== Critical reception and legacy ==
The song was nominated for Vocal Duo of the Year at the 1994 Tejano Music Awards, where the Barrio Boyzz and Selena performed the track. John Lannert of Billboard called "Donde Quiera Que Estés" a "pop/dance monster" during its reign on the top of Latin charts in 1994. After Selena's death, Lannert wrote a retrospective article on the singer for Billboard released on 10 June 1995, he called "Donde Quiera Que Estés" a "pop duet smash". After Selena was inducted into the Billboard Latin Music Hall of Fame on that same issue, Lannert allude the song as being a "rhythmic pop number". On his album review of Dreaming of You, Paul Verna of Billboard called the track a "smash collaboration". Marco Torres wrote in the Houston Press that "Donde Quiera Que Estés" is "probably the best music video of all time". He further wrote that Selena "showcases her pop-princess qualities by teaming up with New York City Latino pop group [the] Barrio Boyzz". Torres also states that "this song about first loves is the perfect balance of harmony, sultry whispers and Selena's ability to turn an otherwise mediocre song into a spectacular hit." The Argus-Press believed that "Donde Quiera Que Estés" and Selena's subsequent single "Amor Prohibido", were added on Dreaming of You to "show how her style grew." Reviewing "Wherever You Are", Howard Cohen and Fernando Gonzalez of The Day, called the track a hip-hop number.

Salsa singers Isidro Infante and La Elite covered the song for the tribute album Familia RMM Recordando a Selena (1996). For the live televised tribute concert Selena ¡VIVE! in April 2005, Aleks Syntek and Fey performed and recorded the song. It was later made available for the album of the concert, released on 10 May 2005. Syntek later re-released the song for his compilation album 3 Décadas de Duetos (2012). In March 2010, the music video for "Donde Quiera Que Estés" and other Selena music videos formed part of a tribute to mark the fifteenth anniversary of the singer's death. It was broadcast to 42 million homes nationwide on Music Choice On Demand in the United States for a limited time.

== Charts ==
=== Weekly charts ===
Chart (1994)	Peak position
US Hot Latin Songs (Billboard)	1
Mexico Grupera Songs (El Siglo de Torreón)	1

=== Year-end charts ===
Chart (1994)	Peak position
US Hot Latin Tracks	6

== Certifications ==
Region	Certification	Certified units/sales
United States (RIAA)	Gold (Latin)	30,000^{‡}
^{‡} Sales+streaming figures based on certification alone.

== Personnel ==
Music video

- Laurice Bell—director
- Jose Behar (EMI Latin)—producer
- Desmond Charles (Tango Productions)—producer

Donde Quiera Que Estés

- Selena—vocals
- the Barrio Boyzz—vocals, scats
- Joe Ojeda—piano
- Chris Pérez—electric guitar
- Suzette Quintanilla—drums
- A.B. Quintanilla—producer
- Domingo Padilla—producer
- Bebu Silvetti—producer
- K. C. Porter—composer
- Miguel Flores—composer
- Desmond Child—composer
- Lisette Lorenzo—art direction

== See also ==
- List of songs recorded by Selena
- List of number-one Billboard Hot Latin Tracks of 1994
- List of works published posthumously
- Latin American music in the United States
