= Mi Amor Por Ti (song) =

1985 song by Álvaro Torres and Marisela

Single by Álvaro Torres and Marisela

from the album Tres
- B-side: "De Punta a Punta"
- Released: 1985
- Recorded: 1985
- Studio: George Tobin Studios (North Hollywood, CA)
- Genre: Soft rock; Latin ballad
- Length: 3:15
- Label: Fonovisa Records
- Songwriter(s): Álvaro Torres
- Producer(s): Enrique Elizondo

Álvaro Torres singles chronology
"Minerva" (1978)	"Mi Amor Por Ti" (1985)	"De Punta a Punta" (1986)

"Mi Amor Por Ti" (My Love for You) is a single by Salvadoran singer Álvaro Torres and Mexican singer Marisela, released on 1985 through Fonovisa Records as part of Torres' seventh studio album Tres. The song was written by Torres, produced by Enrique Elizondo and it was recorded in George Tobin Studios, North Hollywood, CA. "Mi Amor Por Ti" was a popular hit throughout Latin America, becoming the biggest hit of its album.

== Track listing ==
All tracks are written by Álvaro Torres

7" single
No.	Title	Length
1.	"Mi Amor Por Ti" (with Marisela)	3:15
2.	"De Punta a Punta"	3:25
Total length:		6:40

== Personnel ==
Credits adapted from Tres and "Mi Amor Por Ti" liner notes.

Vocals

- Álvaro Torres – lead vocals
- Marisela – lead vocals

Musicians

- David White – arrangements

Production

- Enrique Elizondo – production
- Alan Hirshberg – engineering

Recording

- Recorded at George Tobin Studios, North Hollywood, CA
