= Hazme Olvidarla =

1987 song by Álvaro Torres

Single by Álvaro Torres

from the album Más Romántico Que Nadie
- B-side: "Pienso en Ti" "Adicto"
- Released: 1987
- Recorded: 1987
- Studio: George Tobin Studios (North Hollywood, CA)
- Genre: Soft rock; Latin
- Length: 3:41
- Label: WEA Records
- Songwriter: Álvaro Torres
- Producer: Enrique Elizondo

Álvaro Torres singles chronology
"Tres" (1986)	"Hazme Olvidarla" (1987)	"Amor Que Mata" (1987)

"Hazme Olvidarla" (Make Me Forget Her) is a single by Salvadoran singer Álvaro Torres released in 1987 through WEA Records as part of Torres' eighth studio album Más Romántico Que Nadie. The song was written by Torres, produced by Enrique Elizondo and it was recorded in George Tobin Studios, North Hollywood, CA.

The song was a success in Latin America and the United States, peaking at number 7 in April 1988 on the Billboard Hot Latin Tracks chart.

== Track listing ==
All tracks are written by Álvaro Torres.

7" single - I-10180
No.	Title	Length
1.	"Hazme Olvidarla"	3:41
2.	"Adicto"	3:23
Total length:		7:04

7" single - 180526
No.	Title	Length
1.	"Hazme Olvidarla"	3:41
2.	"Pienso En Ti"	3:22
Total length:		7:03

== Personnel ==
Credits adapted from Más Romántico Que Nadie liner notes.

Vocals

- Álvaro Torres – lead vocals

Musicians

- David White – arrangements

Production

- Enrique Elizondo – production
- Bill Smith – recording

Recording

- Recorded at George Tobin Studios, North Hollywood, CA

== Charts ==
Chart (1988)	Peak position
US Hot Latin Tracks (Billboard)	7

== Conjunto Primavera version ==
Mexican band Conjunto Primavera covered "Hazme Olvidarla" on their 2003 album Decíde Tú. Their version peaked at No. 8 on the Hot Latin Tracks chart and #1 on the Regional Mexican Airplay chart. The track received a nomination for Regional Mexican Airplay Track Of The Year by a Male Group at the 2005 Latin Billboard Music Awards and Regional Mexican Song of the Year at the 2005 Lo Nuestro Awards. It was recognized as one of the best-performing songs of the year at the 2005 BMI Latin Awards.

== See also ==
- List of number-one Billboard Regional Mexican Songs of 2005
