= Nada Se Compara Contigo (song) =

Single by Álvaro Torres

from the album Nada Se Compara Contigo
- Released: October 7, 1991
- Recorded: 1991
- Studio: Santa Fe Recording Studios (Van Nuys, California)
- Genre: Latin pop; Latin ballad
- Length: 4:48
- Label: EMI Capitol Latin
- Songwriter: Álvaro Torres
- Producer: Enrique Elizondo

Álvaro Torres singles chronology
"Quiero Volver a Tu Lado" (1990)	"Nada Se Compara Contigo" (1991)	"Buenos Amigos" (1992)

Music video
- "Nada Se Compara Contigo" on YouTube

"Nada Se Compara Contigo" (English: Nothing Compares to You) is a ballad and title track performed by Salvadoran singer-songwriter Álvaro Torres from his studio album Nada Se Compara Contigo (1991). The track was written by Torres and produced by Enrique Elizondo. It was released as the album's lead single in Latin America and the United States, peaking atop the Billboard's Latin Songs chart, becoming the second number-one song in the chart for Torres as a songwriter, following "Te Pareces Tanto a Él" performed by Chilean performer Myriam Hernández, and his first as a lead performer.

The track debuted in the Billboard Latin Songs chart at number 24 in the week of January 4, 1992 climbing to the top ten four weeks later. The song peaked at number-one on March 7, 1992, replacing "Si Piensas, Si Quieres" by Brazilian singer-songwriter Roberto Carlos and Spanish performer Rocío Dúrcal and being succeeded by "Mi Mayor Necesidad" by Mexican band Los Bukis, two weeks later. Nada Se Compara Conitgo" was recognized as one of the award-winning songs at the first BMI Latin Awards in 1994.

== Background ==
"Nada Se Compara Contigo" is a down tempo ballad which was written by Álvaro Torres inspired by his wife. Torres said he met a Mexican girl at a music event in a chinese restaurant and inmediatally fell in love with her; they continued dating in the same restaurant "because nobody could understand what we were saying". Eventually, that girl became his wife and he wrote her this song.

== Charts ==
=== Weekly charts ===
Chart (1992)	Peak position
US Hot Latin Tracks (Billboard)	1

=== Year-end charts ===
Chart (1992)	Peak position
US Hot Latin Tracks (Billboard)	11

== See also ==
- List of number-one Billboard Hot Latin Tracks of 1992
