= El Último Romántico =

1998 studio album by Álvaro Torres

Studio album by Álvaro Torres
- Released: February 10, 1998
- Recorded: 1997–1998
- Studio: House Of Blues (Encino, CA); Mad Hatter (Los Angeles, CA); Sound About (Van Nuys, CA); Westlake Studios (Hollywood, CA)
- Genre: Latin pop; Soft rock; latin ballad
- Length: 41:18
- Language: Spanish
- Label: EMI Latin
- Producer: Álvaro Torres; Nelson Gonzalez

Álvaro Torres chronology
En Busca del Amor (1996)	El Último Romántico (1998)	Amante de la Vida (2000)

Singles from El Último Romántico
- 1. "El Último Romántico" Released: 1997; 2. "Puede Ser" Released: 1998; 3. "Te Recordaré Por Siempre" Released: 1998

El Último Romántico (English: The Last Romantic) is the 15th studio album recorded by Salvadoran singer-songwriter Álvaro Torres, The album was released by EMI Latin on February 10, 1998 (see 1998 in music). The album was produced by himself and Nelson Gonzalez and recorded in four different studios.

The single "El Último Romántico" was Torres' last international hit, peaking at number 12 in May 1998 on the Billboard Hot Latin Tracks chart.

== Track listing ==
All tracks are written by Álvaro Torres

No.	Title	Length
1.	"Amor Sublime"	4:08
2.	"Puede Ser"	3:48
3.	"El Último Romántico"	4:09
4.	"Un Día de Estos"	4:44
5.	"Lo Que Me Quede Por Vivir"	4:09
6.	"Duele Más"	3:59
7.	"Como Quisiera"	3:49
8.	"Por Qué Te Vas?"	4:16
9.	"Tú y Yo"	4:12
10.	"Te Recordaré Por Siempre"	4:04
Total length:		41:18

== Personnel ==
Credits adapted from El Último Romántico liner notes.

Vocals

- Álvaro Torres – lead vocals
- Kenny O'Brien – backing vocals
- Maria del Rey – backing vocals
- Cleto Escobedo – backing vocals
- Carlos Murguía – backing vocals
- Gisa Vatcky – backing vocals

Musicians

- César Benítez – arrangements, keyboards
- George Doering – electric guitar, acoustic guitar
- Pedro Eustache – flute
- Enrique Martinez – accordion
- Jorge Moraga – string section
- Ramón Stagnaro – acoustic guitar
- Michael Thompson – electric guitar
- Roberto Vally – bass
- Carlos Yega – drums
- Ramon Yslas – percussion

Production

- Álvaro Torres – production
- Nelson Gonzalez – production, coordination
- Benny Faccone – mixing, engineering
- César Benítez – programming
- Dale Lawton – engineering assistance, mixing assistance
- Jonathan Burtner – engineering assistance, mixing assistance
- Jordan d'Alessio – engineering assistance, mixing assistance
- Rich Veltrop – engineering assistance, mixing assistance
- Cristina Abaroa – production coordination

Recording

- Recorded in House Of Blues, Encino, CA; Mad Hatter, Los Angeles, CA; Sound About, Van Nuys, CA; Westlake Studios, Hollywood, CA.
