= Tres (Álvaro Torres album) =

Studio album by Salvadoran singer Álvaro Torres

Studio album by Álvaro Torres
- Released: 1985
- Recorded: 1985
- Studio: George Tobin Studios (North Hollywood, CA)
- Genre: Soft rock; Latin ballad
- Label: Profono Internacional, Inc.
- Producer: Enrique Elizondo

Álvaro Torres chronology
Sin Cadenas (1984)	Tres (1985)	Más Romántico Que Nadie (1987)

Singles from Tres
- 1. "Mi Amor Por Ti" Released: 1985; 2. "De Punta a Punta" Released: 1986; 3. "Tres" Released: 1986

Tres (Three) is the seventh studio album by Salvadoran singer Álvaro Torres, released on 1985 through Fonovisa Records. It was produced by produced by Enrique Elizondo and it was recorded in George Tobin Studios, North Hollywood, CA.

The album was a success in Latin America and was his first album to chart in the United States, peaking at number 4 in May 1986, on the Billboard Latin Pop Albums chart. The single "Mi Amor Por Ti" interpreted along with Mexican singer Marisela, became the biggest hit from this album. Also "De Punta a Punta" and "Tres" obtained a huge recognition all across Latin America and United States.

== Track listing ==
All tracks are written by Álvaro Torres

A-side
No.	Title	Length
1.	"Tres"	3:42
2.	"Mi Amor Por Ti" (with Marisela)	3:15
3.	"Voy A Conseguir Tu Amor"	3:00
4.	"Yo Te Amo"	3:50
5.	"Yo Te Seguiré Queriendo"	3:40

B-side
No.	Title	Length
1.	"De Punta A Punta"	3:25
2.	"Quiero Olvidarme de Ti"	3:07
3.	"Harto"	3:24
4.	"Tengo Miedo de Amarte"	3:28
5.	"Ya No Puedo Vivir Sin Ti"	3:59

== Personnel ==
Credits adapted from Tres liner notes.

Vocals

- Álvaro Torres – lead vocals
- Marisela – lead vocals

Musicians

- David White – arrangements

Production

- Enrique Elizondo – production
- Alan Hirshberg – engineering

Recording

- Recorded at George Tobin Studios, North Hollywood, CA

== Charts ==
=== Weekly charts ===
Chart (1986)	Peak position
US Latin Pop Albums (Billboard)	4

=== Year-end charts ===
Chart (1986)	Peak position
US Latin Pop Albums (Billboard)	15
