= Más Romántico Que Nadie =

1987 studio album by Álvaro Torres

Studio album by Álvaro Torres
- Released: October 27, 1987
- Recorded: 1987
- Studio: George Tobin Studios (North Hollywood, CA)
- Genre: Latin pop; soft rock; latin ballad
- Language: Spanish
- Label: Profono International, Inc.
- Producer: Enrique Elizondo

Álvaro Torres chronology
| Tres (1985) | Más Romántico Que Nadie (1987) | Si Estuvieras Conmigo (1990) |

Singles from Más Romántico Que Nadie
- 1. "Hazme Olvidarla" Released: October 5, 1987; 2. "Amor Que Mata" Released: February 15, 1988; 3. "Adicto" Released: April 11, 1988; 4. "Por lo Mucho Que Te Amo" Released: October 3, 1988

Más Romántico Que Nadie (English: More Romantic Than Anyone) is the eighth studio album recorded by Salvadoran singer-songwriter Álvaro Torres, The album witch released by Profono International, Inc in late 1987 (see 1987 in music). It was produced by produced by Enrique Elizondo and it was recorded in George Tobin Studios, North Hollywood, CA.

The album was a success in Latin America and the United States, peaking at number 8 in December 1987 on the Billboard Latin Pop Albums chart. The lead single "Hazme Olvidarla" became the biggest hit from this album, reaching the 7 position on Billboard Hot Latin Tracks.

== Track listing ==
All tracks are written by Álvaro Torres

A-side
| No. | Title | Writer(s) | Length |
|---|---|---|---|
| 1. | "Pienso En Ti" | Álvaro Torres | 3:22 |
| 2. | "Qué No Me Dejes De Amar" | Álvaro Torres | 3:35 |
| 3. | "Más Romántico Que Nadie" | Álvaro Torres | 3:43 |
| 4. | "Esa Mujer" | Álvaro Torres | 3:43 |
| 5. | "Soy Un Hombre Muerto" | Álvaro Torres | 3:15 |

B-side
| No. | Title | Writer(s) | Length |
|---|---|---|---|
| 1. | "Amor Que Mata" | Álvaro Torres | 3:20 |
| 2. | "Tal Para Cual" | Álvaro Torres | 3:25 |
| 3. | "Hazme Olvidarla" | Álvaro Torres | 3:41 |
| 4. | "Adicto" | Álvaro Torres | 3:23 |
| 5. | "Por Lo Mucho Que Te Amo" | Álvaro Torres | 3:31 |

== Credits and personnel ==
Credits adapted from Más Romántico Que Nadie liner notes.

Vocals

- Álvaro Torres – lead vocals

Musicians

- David White – arrangements

Production

- Enrique Elizondo – production
- Bill Smith – recording

Recording

- Recorded at George Tobin Studios, North Hollywood, CA

== Charts ==
=== Weekly charts ===
| Chart (1987) | Peak position |
|---|---|
| US Latin Pop Albums (Billboard) | 8 |

=== Year-end charts ===
| Chart (1988) | Peak position |
|---|---|
| US Latin Pop Albums (Billboard) | 17 |
