= He Vivido Esperando Por Ti =

1992 song by Álvaro Torres

Single by Álvaro Torres

from the album Nada Se Compara Contigo
- Released: 1992
- Recorded: 1991
- Studio: Santa Fe Recording Studios (Van Nuys, California)
- Genre: Latin ballad; Soft rock
- Length: 4:21
- Label: EMI Latin
- Songwriter: Álvaro Torres
- Producer: Enrique Elizondo

Álvaro Torres singles chronology
"Buenos Amigos" (1992)	"He Vivido Esperando Por Ti" (1992)	"Te Olvidaré" (1992)

"He Vivido Esperando Por Ti" (English: I Lived Waiting for You) is a ballad performed by Salvadoran singer-songwriter Álvaro Torres released in 1992 through EMI Latin as part of Torres' tenth studio album Nada Se Compara Contigo (1991). The song was written by Torres, produced by Enrique Elizondo and it was recorded in Santa Fe Recording Studios, Van Nuys, California

The song was a success in Latin America and the United States, peaking at number 4 in September 1992 on the Billboard Hot Latin Tracks chart. It was recognized as one of the best-performing songs of the year at the 1994 BMI Latin Awards.

== Personnel ==
Credits adapted from Nada Se Compara Contigo liner notes.

- Álvaro Torres – lead vocals, composing
- Chuck Anderson – arrangements
- Daniel Ash – composing
- Kevin Haskins – composing
- David J – composing

Production

- Enrique Elizondo – production
- Bob Biles – engineering
- Chris Morrison – engineering assistance

Recording

- Recorded at Santa Fe Recording Studios, Van Nuys, California

== Charts ==
=== Weekly charts ===
Chart (1992)	Peak position
US Hot Latin Tracks (Billboard)	4

=== Year-end charts ===
Chart (1992)	Peak position
US Billboard Hot Latin Tracks	32
