= Si Estuvieras Conmigo (song) =

1990 song by Álvaro Torres

Single by Álvaro Torres

from the album Si Estuvieras Conmigo
- Released: 1990
- Recorded: 1989–90
- Studio: Rusk Sound Studios (Los Angeles)
- Genre: Latin ballad; soft rock
- Length: 5:00
- Label: EMI Latin
- Songwriter: Álvaro Torres
- Producer: Bebu Silvetti

Álvaro Torres singles chronology
"Ni Tú Ni Ella" (1990)	"Si Estuvieras Conmigo" (1990)	"Mi Verdadero Amor" (1990)

Music video
- "Si Estuvieras Conmigo" on YouTube

"Si Estuvieras Conmigo" is a single by Salvadoran singer Álvaro Torres released on 1990 through EMI Latin as part of Torres' ninth studio album Si Estuvieras Conmigo. The song was written by Torres, produced by Bebu Silvetti and it was recorded in Rusk Sound Studios, Los Angeles.

The song was a success in Latin America and the United States, peaking at number 9 in August 1990 on the Billboard Hot Latin Tracks chart.

== Personnel ==
Credits adapted from Si Estuvieras Conmigo liner notes.

Vocals

- Álvaro Torres – lead vocals
- Kenny O'Brien – backing vocals
- Maria Del Rey – backing vocals
- Michel Jimenez – backing vocals
- Nina Swan – backing vocals

Musicians

- Bebu Silvetti – arrangements, conducting, piano, keyboards
- José Peña – bass guitar
- Ezra Kliger – coordination
- Suzie Katayama – copyist
- Grant Geissman – guitar
- John Yoakum – tenor saxophone
- Alan Kaplan – trombone
- Charlie Davis – trumpet
- Ramon Flores – trumpet

Production

- Bebu Silvetti – production
- Elton Ahi – mixing
- Eric Scheda – mixing
- Boon Heng Tam – engineering assistance
- Gustavo Borner – engineering assistance

Recording

- Recorded and mixed at Rusk Sound Studios, Los Angeles

== Charts ==
=== Weekly charts ===
Chart (1990)	Peak position
US Hot Latin Tracks (Billboard)	9

== Covers ==
In 1997, Panamanian salsa singer Roberto Blades covered "Si Estuvieras Conmigo" on his album En Buena Hora. This version peaked at number 16 on the Billboard Tropical Songs chart.
