= Si Estuvieras Conmigo =

1990 studio album by Álvaro Torres

Studio album by Álvaro Torres
- Released: May 15, 1990
- Recorded: 1989–1990
- Studio: Rusk Sound Studios (Los Angeles, CA)
- Genre: Latin pop; soft rock; latin ballad
- Language: Spanish
- Label: Capitol/EMI Latin
- Producer: Bebu Silvetti

Álvaro Torres chronology
Más Romántico Que Nadie (1987)	Si Estuvieras Conmigo (1990)	Nada Se Compara Contigo (1991)

Singles from Si Estuvieras Conmigo
- 1. "Ni Tú Ni Ella" Released: April 16, 1990; 2. "Si Estuvieras Conmigo" Released: July 9, 1990; 3. "Mi Verdadero Amor" Released: October 1, 1990

Si Estuvieras Conmigo (English: If You Were with Me) is the ninth studio album recorded by Salvadoran singer-songwriter Álvaro Torres, The album witch released by EMI Latin on May 15, 1990 (see 1990 in music). It was produced by Bebu Silvetti and recorded at Rusk Sound Studios, Los Angeles.

The album was a success in Latin America and the United States, peaking at number 5 in July 1990 on the Billboard Latin Pop Albums chart.

== Track listing ==
All tracks are written by Álvaro Torres, except where noted.

No.	Title	Length
1.	"Mi Verdadero Amor"	3:40
2.	"Cuidado"	3:45
3.	"Ven Y Dame Un Poco Más" (written by S. Riera Ibanez; music by Bebu Silvetti)	3:25
4.	"Quiero Volver a Tu Lado" (with Tatiana)	3:40
5.	"Si Estuvieras Conmigo"	3:23
6.	"Ni Tú Ni Ella"	5:00
7.	"Por Ti Mi Amor" (written by S. Riera Ibanez; music by Bebu Silvetti)	3:50
8.	"Se Acabó" (written by Sergio Fachelli; music by Sergio Fachelli)	3:15
9.	"Vuelve Por Favor"	3:50
10.	"Mujer de Nieve"	3:20

Bonus Track - CD version H2Y42260
No.	Title	Length
11.	"Ven Y Dame Un Poco Mas" (CD version; written by S. Riera Ibanez; music by Bebu Silvetti)

== Credits and personnel ==
Credits adapted from Si Estuvieras Conmigo liner notes.

Vocals

- Álvaro Torres – lead vocals
- Kenny O'Brien – backing vocals
- Maria Del Rey – backing vocals
- Michel Jimenez – backing vocals
- Nina Swan – backing vocals

Musicians

- Bebu Silvetti – arrangements, conducting, piano, keyboards
- José Peña – bass guitar
- Ezra Kliger – coordination
- Suzie Katayama – copyist
- Grant Geissman – guitar
- John Yoakum – tenor saxophone
- Alan Kaplan – trombone
- Charlie Davis – trumpet
- Ramon Flores – trumpet

Artwork

- Joe La Russo – photography

Production

- Bebu Silvetti – production
- Elton Ahi – mixing
- Eric Scheda – mixing
- Boon Heng Tam – engineering assistance
- Gustavo Borner – engineering assistance

Recording

- Recorded and mixed at Rusk Sound Studios, Los Angeles, CA

== Charts ==
=== Weekly charts ===
Chart (1990)	Peak position
US Latin Pop Albums (Billboard)	5

=== Year-end charts ===
Chart (1990)	Peak position
US Latin Pop Albums (Billboard)	22
