= Te Dejo Libre =

1992 single by Álvaro Torres

Single by Álvaro Torres

from the album Nada Se Compara Contigo
- Released: 1992
- Studio: Santa Fe Recording Studios, Van Nuys, California
- Genre: Latin pop; soft rock; latin ballad
- Length: 4:39
- Label: Capitol/EMI Latin
- Songwriter: Álvaro Torres
- Producer: Enrique Elizondo

Álvaro Torres singles chronology
"Te Olvidaré" (1992)	"Te Dejo Libre" (1992)	"Cruz de Olvido" (1992)

"Te Dejo Libre" (English: I Leave You Free) is a ballad performed by Salvadoran singer-songwriter Álvaro Torres released in 1992 through EMI Latin as part of Torres' tenth studio album Nada Se Compara Contigo (1991). The song was written by Torres, produced by Enrique Elizondo and it was recorded in Santa Fe Recording Studios, Van Nuys, California

The song was a success in Latin America and the United States, peaking at number 4 in May 1993 on the Billboard Hot Latin Tracks chart. It was recognized as one of the best-performing songs of the year at the 1994 BMI Latin Awards.

== Personnel ==
Credits adapted from Nada Se Compara Contigo liner notes.

- Álvaro Torres – lead vocals, composing
- Chuck Anderson – arrangements
- Daniel Ash – composing
- Kevin Haskins – composing
- David J – composing

Production

- Enrique Elizondo – production
- Bob Biles – engineering
- Chris Morrison – engineering assistance

Recording

- Recorded at Santa Fe Recording Studios, Van Nuys, California

== Charts ==
=== Weekly charts ===
Chart (1993)	Peak position
US Hot Latin Tracks (Billboard)	4

=== Year-end charts ===
Chart (1993)	Position
US Latin Songs (Billboard)	24
