= Selena ¡Vive! =

- Created by: Abraham Quintanilla, Jr.
- Presented by: Don Francisco
- Starring: Thalía; Gloria Estefan; Soraya; Pepe Aguilar; Ana Bárbara; Banda el Recodo; Aleks Syntek; La India; Jay Perez; Paulina Rubio; Alejandra Guzmán; Olga Tañón; Fey; Pablo Montero; Graciela Beltrán; Ana Gabriel; Montez de Durango; Bobby Pulido; Kumbia Kings; Los Dinos; Pete Astudillo
- Country of origin: United States
- Original language: Spanish

Production
- Production locations: Houston, Texas, United States
- Running time: 190 minutes (including commercials)

Original release
- Network: Univision
- Release: April 7, 2005

Selena ¡Vive! (English: Selena Lives!) was a benefit concert held on the tenth anniversary of the death of Tejano superstar Selena. The concert was held on April 7, 2005 at the Reliant Stadium in Houston, Texas with over 70,000 attendees. The special was produced and filmed by the Spanish language network, Univision, and was the most-watched special in the Spanish language in the history of American television. Event host Univision announced that proceeds from "¡Selena Vive!" would go toward 10 scholarships for students looking to pursue higher education at Texas universities.

== Concert synopsis ==
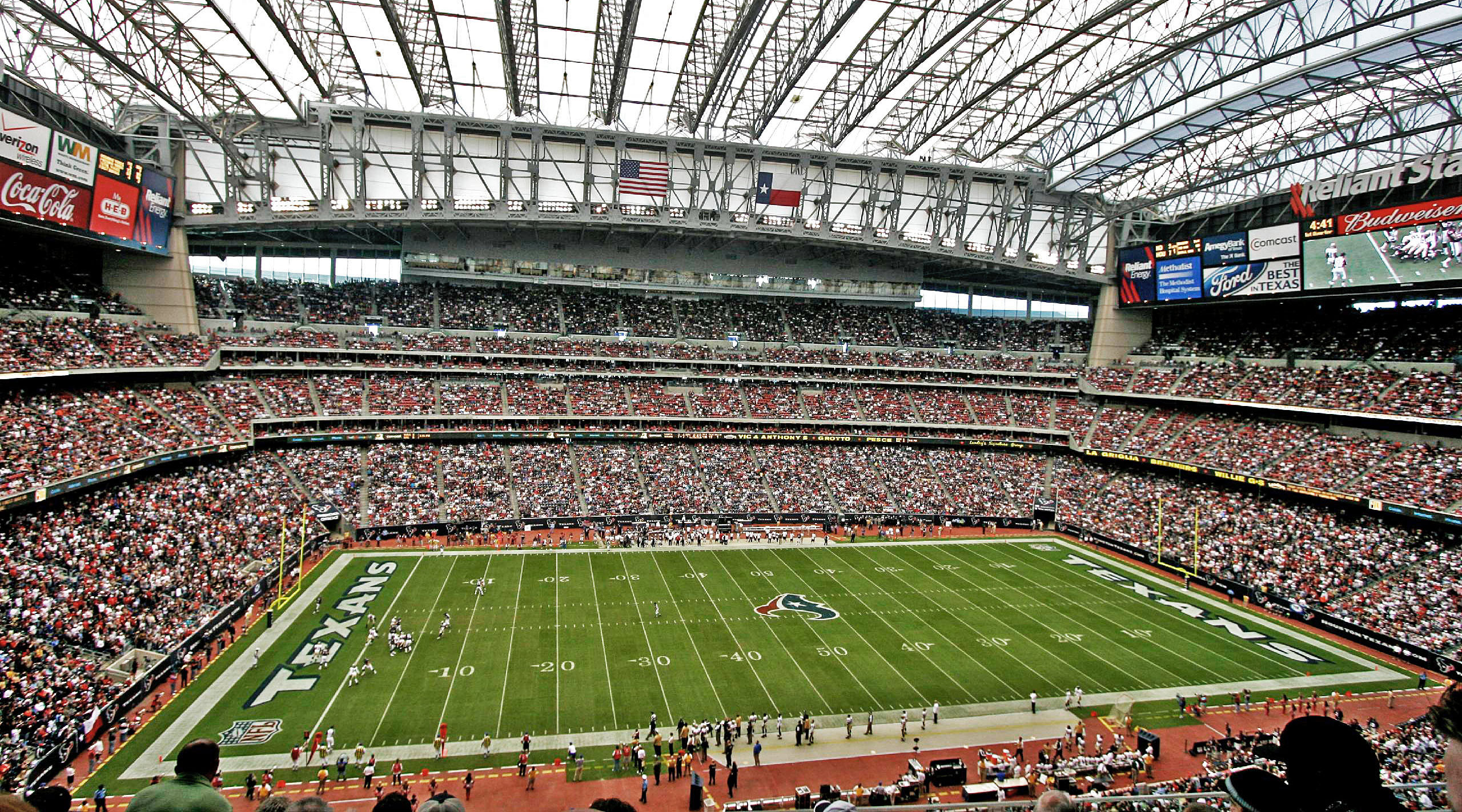
The event was held at Reliant Stadium

The special opened with an introduction by Jennifer Lopez, followed by Selena's original greeting to the fans at her last concert at the Houston Astrodome on February 26, 1995. The musical tribute also included Mexican singer Thalía's interpretation of one of Selena's songs, "Amor Prohibido". This was followed by many Latin singers, performing a collection of Selena's songs.

The group Banda el Recodo performed a rendition of "Techno Cumbia". Puerto Rican salsa group India performed "No Debes Jugar". After a short video recounting Selena's discovery, Mexican recording artist Ana Bárbara performed "La Carcacha" with dancers. The duet "Buenos Amigos" was performed by newcomer Mariana Seoane and Pablo Montero. Singer Alicia Villarreal ended the segment with "Si Una Vez".

Following another video recalling Selena's international success, Mexican singer Ana Gabriel dedicated her performance of Selena's "Tú, Sólo Tú" to her memory. She then introduced Pepe Aguilar, who dedicated his rendition of "No Me Queda Más". After a video depicting Selena's origins in Texas, the song "Fotos Y Recuerdos" by Paulina Rubio was performed.

The next video segment showed Selena's back-up band, Los Dinos, and was narrated by one of its former members, Pete Astudillo. Astudillo then performed the song he wrote after her death, "Cómo Te Extraño". After a video montage covering Selena's life, Puerto Rico's Olga Tañón performed the song "La Llamada". Singer Gloria Estefan performed Selena's English language hit "I Could Fall in Love".

Selena's brother A.B. Quintanilla and his group, Kumbia Kings, performed a duet with his sister in a specially remixed version of her hit "Baila Esta Cumbia". Later, Mexican singer Alejandra Guzmán performed Selena's song "Bidi Bidi Bom Bom". This was followed by a Tex-Mex medley by Bobby Pulido and Jay Pérez with "Ya Ves" and "Yo Te Sigo Queriendo".

The late Colombian singer/songwriter Soraya performed "Dreaming of You" and was joined on stage by the vocal group Barrio Boyzz. Mexican singer Graciela Beltrán performed the song "El Chico Del Apartamento 512".

A video of Selena's legacy was then followed by Aleks Syntek and Fey performing "Donde Quiera Que Estés". The band, Montéz de Durango performed an arrangement of "Ven Conmigo".

At the end of the concert, a video of Selena, performing "Como la Flor" played on giant video screens accompanied by Los Dinos, while all the performers returned to the stage to sing the chorus along with a 55-member children's choir from Stevenson Elementary.

== Ratings ==
The special achieved a 35.9 Nielsen rating across the United States under its "Hispanic Television Index" rating, with 3.9 million viewers estimated to watch it live, and at the time was the largest-viewed special in the Spanish language in the history of American television. The special also topped the Nielsen ratings in several markets among viewers 18-34 outside the HTI, against a season 4 episode of Fox's American Idol.

== Album ==
Selena ¡Vive!

Live album by Various artists
- Released: May 10, 2005
- Recorded: April 7, 2005
- Venues: Reliant Stadium, Houston, Texas, United States
- Genres: Tejano, Latin pop
- Label: EMI Latin
- Producer: A.B. Quintanilla

Selena chronology
Unforgettable (2005)	Selena ¡Vive! (2005)	Dos Historias (2006)

The tribute concert was followed up with the release of the album of the performance, released on May 10, 2005.

=== Track listing ===
1. "Tú Sólo Tú" - Ana Gabriel
2. "Amor Prohibido" - Thalía
3. "El Chico del Apartamento 512" - Lucero
4. "I Could Fall in Love" - Gloria Estefan
5. "La Carcacha" - Ana Bárbara
6. "Como Te Extraño" - Pete Astudillo
7. "Donde Quiera Que Estés" - Aleks Syntek and Fey
8. "Si Una Vez" - Alicia Villareal
9. "Bidi Bidi Bom Bom" - Alejandra Guzmán
10. "No Debes Jugar" - India
11. "Dreaming of You" - Soraya and The Barrio Boyzz
12. "Como la Flor" - Selena
