= El Último Romántico (song) =

1997 song by Álvaro Torres

Single by Álvaro Torres

from the album El Último Romántico
- Released: 1997
- Recorded: 1997
- Studio: House Of Blues, (Encino, CA); Mad Hatter, (Los Angeles, CA); Sound About, (Van Nuys, CA); Westlake Studios, (Hollywood, CA).
- Genre: Latin pop • Soft rock • Latin ballad
- Length: 4:09
- Label: EMI
- Songwriter(s): Álvaro Torres
- Producer(s): Álvaro Torres; Nelson Gonzalez

Álvaro Torres singles chronology
"Stress" (1996)	"El Último Romántico" (1997)	"Puede ser" (1998)

Music video
- "El Último Romántico" on YouTube

"El Último Romántico" is a single by Salvadoran singer Álvaro Torres released on 1997 through EMI Latin as part of Torres' fifteenth studio album El Último Romántico. The song was written by Torres, produced by himself and Nelson Gonzalez and recorded in four different studios.

"El Último Romántico" was Torres' last international hit, peaking at number 12 in May 1998 on the Billboard Hot Latin Tracks chart.

== Track listing ==
CD single 700-200191
No.	Title	Writer(s)	Length
1.	"El Último Romántico"	Álvaro Torres	4:09

== Personnel ==
Credits adapted from El Último Romántico liner notes.

Vocals

- Álvaro Torres – lead vocals
- Kenny O'Brien – backing vocals
- Maria del Rey – backing vocals
- Cleto Escobedo – backing vocals
- Carlos Murguía – backing vocals
- Gisa Vatcky – backing vocals

Musicians

- César Benítez – arrangements, keyboards
- George Doering – electric guitar, acoustic guitar
- Pedro Eustache – flute
- Enrique Martinez – accordion
- Jorge Moraga – string section
- Ramón Stagnaro – acoustic guitar
- Michael Thompson – electric guitar
- Roberto Vally – bass
- Carlos Yega – drums
- Ramon Yslas – percussion

Production

- Álvaro Torres – production
- Nelson Gonzalez – production, coordination
- Benny Faccone – mixing, engineering
- César Benítez – programming
- Dale Lawton – engineering assistance, mixing assistance
- Jonathan Burtner – engineering assistance, mixing assistance
- Jordan d'Alessio – engineering assistance, mixing assistance
- Rich Veltrop – engineering assistance, mixing assistance
- Cristina Abaroa – production coordination

Recording

- Recorded in House Of Blues, Encino, CA; Mad Hatter, Los Angeles, CA; Sound About, Van Nuys, CA; Westlake Studios, Hollywood, CA.

== Charts ==
Chart (1995)	Peak position
US Hot Latin Tracks (Billboard)	12
US Latin Pop Airplay (Billboard)	15
US Tropical Airplay (Billboard)	15
