= Roberto Carlos 1992 =

Studio album by Roberto Carlos
- Released: 1991
- Recorded: 1991
- Genre: Latin pop
- Language: Spanish
- Label: Sony Discos
- Producer: Roberto Livi

Roberto Carlos chronology
Roberto Carlos '88 (1988)	Roberto Carlos 1992 (1991)	Roberto Carlos (1992)

Singles from Roberto Carlos 1992
- 1. "Si Piensas, Si Quieres" Released: 1991; 2. "Adónde Andarás Paloma" Released: 1991; 3. "Por Ella" Released: 1991

Roberto Carlos 1992 or Roberto Carlos (Súper Héroe) is a studio album recorded by Brazilian singer-songwriter Roberto Carlos, It was released by Sony Discos in late 1991 (see 1991 in music). The album was produced by Roberto Livi and includes the number-one single in the Billboard Top Latin Songs chart "Si Piensas, Si Quieres", a duet with Spanish singer Rocío Dúrcal. The album was certified double platinum in Brazil.

== Track listing ==
No.	Title	Writer(s)	Length
1.	"Súper Héroe (Super Hero)"	Erasmo Carlos, Roberto Carlos, Richard O'Brien
2.	"Adónde Andarás Paloma (Where Would You Be, My Love)"	Roberto Livi
3.	"Si Piensas, Si Quieres (If You Think So, If You Want To)" (Duet with Rocío Dúrcal)	Livi, Alejandro Vezzani	3:53
4.	"Estos Celos (This Jealousy)"	Paul Massadas, Michael Sullivan
5.	"Quiero Paz (I Want Peace)"	R. Carlos, E. Carlos
6.	"Una Casita Blanca (A Little White House)"	Livi
7.	"Por Ella (For Her)"	José Soto
8.	"Una en un Millón (One In A Million)"	Livi, Vezzani
9.	"El Sexo y Mi Corazón (Sex and My Heart)"	R. Carlos, E. Carlos
10.	"Pobre de Quien Quiera Amarme Después de Tí (Sorry for The One Who Loves Me After You)"	R. Carlos, E. Carlos

== Chart performance ==
Chart (1992)	Peak position
US Billboard Latin Pop Albums	7

== Certifications ==
Certifications for "Roberto Carlos 1992"
Region	Certification	Certified units/sales
Brazil (Pro-Música Brasil)	2× Platinum	500,000^{*}
^{*} Sales figures based on certification alone.
