= En Busca del Amor =

1996 studio album by Álvaro Torres

Studio album by Álvaro Torres
- Released: April 30, 1996
- Recorded: 1995–1996
- Studio: Capitol Recording Studios; Conway Recording Studios; Ocean Way Recording Studios (Los Angeles, CA); Power Light Studio (San Juan, Puerto Rico); Sound About (Van Nuys, CA)
- Genre: Latin pop; soft rock; latin ballad
- Length: 40:23
- Language: Spanish
- Label: EMI Latin
- Producer: Álvaro Torres; Nelson González

Álvaro Torres chronology
Reencuentro (1995)	En Busca del Amor (1996)	El Último Romántico (1998)

Singles from En Busca del Amor
- 1. "Stress" Released: April 1, 1996

En Busca del Amor (English: In Searching for Love) is the 14th studio album recorded by Salvadoran singer-songwriter Álvaro Torres, The album was released by EMI Latin on April 30, 1996 (see 1996 in music). The album was produced by himself and co-produced by Nelson González and recorded in five different studios.

== Track listing ==
All tracks are written by Álvaro Torres

No.	Title	Length
1.	"En Busca del Amor"	4:15
2.	"Solo Te Tengo a Ti"	4:21
3.	"Mi Ángel de Amor"	4:06
4.	"Mujeres Solas"	3:44
5.	"De Qué Me Sirve Quererte"	3:43
6.	"Stress"	3:48
7.	"Una Locura"	3:59
8.	"Solo Me Queda Olvidarte"	3:57
9.	"Tan Cerca y Tan Lejos"	3:45
10.	"Solo Yo Lo Sé"	4:45
Total length:		40:23

== Personnel ==
Credits adapted from En Busca del Amor liner notes.

Vocals

- Álvaro Torres – lead vocals
- Tito Allen – backing vocals
- Wichy Camacho – backing vocals
- Leyla Hoyle – backing vocals
- Alejandro Enrique Martínez – backing vocals
- Kenny OBrian – backing vocals
- Isela Sotelo – backing vocals

Musicians

- Carmelo Alvarez – bells, bongos
- César Benítez – arrangements, keyboards
- Luis Conte – percussion
- George Doering – acoustic guitar
- Joan Elardo – oboe
- Ramon Flores – trumpet
- Domingo Garcia – piano
- Barbie Insua – art direction
- Peter Kent – concert master
- Brad Kintschner – french horn
- Michael Landau – electric guitar
- Elías Lopés – trumpet
- Ángel "Angie" Machado – trumpet
- Chago Martínez – percussion, timbales
- Enrique Martinez – accordion
- Jimmy Morales – congas
- Joel Peskin – tenor saxophone, alto saxophone
- John "J.R." Robinson – drums
- John Rosenberg – strings
- Martin Santiago – bass
- Ramón Stagnaro – acoustic guitar
- Neil Stubenhaus – bass
- Raffi Torres – trombone
- Arturo Velasco – trombone
- Amy Wilkins – harp

Art design

- Héctor Sandoval – design

Production

- Álvaro Torres – production
- Nelson Gonzalez – production, art supervising
- Arturo Reyna – engineering
- Ronnie Torres – engineering
- Benny Faccone – mixing
- Christina Abaroa – production coordination
- César Benítez – programming
- Jordan d'Alessio – engineering assistance
- Peter Doell – engineering assistance
- Leslie Ann Jones – engineering assistance
- Doug Michael – engineering assistance
- Jennifer Monnar – engineering assistance
- Cesar Ramirez – engineering assistance

Recording

- Recorded in Capitol Recording Studios, Hollywood, CA; Conway Recording Studios, Hollywood, CA; Ocean Way Recording Studios, Hollywood, CA; Power Light Studio, San Juan, Puerto Rico; Sound About, Van Nuys, CA.
