= Evidências =

Single by Chitãozinho & Xororó

from the album Cowboy do Asfalto
- Language: Portuguese language
- English title: Evidence
- Released: December 4, 1990
- Recorded: October 1990
- Genre: Sertanejo music
- Length: 4:54
- Label: PolyGram
- Songwriters: José Augusto, Paulo Sérgio Valle
- Producers: José Homero Béttio, Paulo Debétio

Chitãozinho & Xororó singles chronology
"Página Virada" (1990)	"Evidências" (1990)	"Cowboy do Asfalto" (1991)

"Evidências" is a song written by José Augusto and Paulo Sérgio Valle in 1989 and made famous by Chitãozinho & Xororó on their album Cowboy do Asfalto in 1990, becoming the greatest hit on the radio in that year and receiving significant airplay the year after.

It's one of the duo's signature songs, being popular in their concerts to date and being covered by numerous other artists. It is used in some internet memes and is considered the most popular song in Brazilian karaokes.

== History ==
The song was composed by José Augusto and Paulo Sérgio Valle. It was first recorded in May 1989 by Leonardo Sullivan, who released it in June of that year in his album Veneno, Mel e Sabor This recording was only regionally released and failed to gain national success.

José Augusto had already collaborated with Chitãozinho e Xororó when he offered them the song "Página Virada", from the album Os Meninos do Brasil (1989). In 1990, he sent them a cassette tape with some new songs, including "Evidências" and a Portuguese language version of "Bridge over Troubled Water", originally by American duo Simon & Garfunkel. Chitãozinho e Xororó recall having appreciated the song so much that it was the first song they showed to conductor and arranger Julinho Teixeira when entering the studio to commence work on their then upcoming new album.

== Reception ==
Critic Tárik de Souza, in a negative review of Cowboy do Asfalto, referred to the song when he said that "the essence of the [album] content is pop ballads" and also said that the song "conserves sertanejo only in the duo's mariachi vocal tremolo".

Hardcore punk band Ratos de Porão's vocalist João Gordo once hailed the song as one of his favorites ever, highlighting the vocal arrangements of the duo.

== Personnel ==
Per the copyrights registry:

- Chitãozinho & Xororó — vocals
- Clodo – percussion
- Faiska – guitar
- Julinho Teixeira – arrangements and keyboards
- Maguinho – drums
- Paulinho Ferreira – acoustic guitar
- Sylvinho Mazzuca – bass

== Other performances ==
In September 2023, keyboardist John Fossit played an instrumental version of "Evidências" in a concert of Bruno Mars in Brazil. Singer Xororó and his son Junior Lima celebrated with the audience.

Chitãozinho & Xororó performed "Evidências" along with Arlete Salles, Ingrid Guimarães and Tatá Werneck in the 2023 Brazilian film Minha Irmã e Eu.

The song "Evidências" is in the main plot of the 2024 Brazilian film Evidências do Amor, starring Sandy and Fábio Porchat. Songwriter José Augusto makes a cameo in the film.

== Spanish version ==
The song was covered in Spanish by Mexican singer Ana Gabriel for her 1992 album Silueta. Her version topped the Hot Latin Songs charts for ten weeks between 8 August and 10 October 1992. "Evidencias" ended 1992 at best-performing Latin song of the year in the US. At the inaugural ASCAP Latin Awards in 1993, it won Pop Song of the Year for the track in a tie with "No Sé Tú". It was also nominated Pop Song of the Year at the 5th Lo Nuestro Award in the same year, but lost to "No Sé Tú".

In 2014, another Mexican singer, Lucero, re-recorded this version for the album Aquí Estoy, and re-released it for her album Brasileira.

== See also ==
- Billboard Hot Latin Songs Year-End Chart
- List of number-one Billboard Hot Latin Tracks of 1992
