= Si Piensas, Si Quieres =

Single by Roberto Carlos and Rocío Dúrcal

from the album Super Héroe
- Released: 1991
- Recorded: 1991
- Genre: Latin pop · Latin ballad
- Length: 3:53
- Label: Sony Discos
- Songwriter: Alejandro Vezanni · Roberto Livi
- Producer: Roberto Livi

Roberto Carlos singles chronology
"Mujer" (1991)	"Si Piensas, Si Quieres" (1991)	"Adónde Andarás Paloma" (1992)

Rocío Dúrcal singles chronology
"A Que Me Quedo Contigo" (1991)	"Si Piensas, Si Quieres" (1991)	"Fue un Placer Conocerte" (1992)

"Si Piensas, Si Quieres" (English: If You Think So, If You Want To) is a Latin pop song performed by Brazilian singer-songwriter Roberto Carlos from his studio album Super Héroe (1991). The track was written by Alejandro Vezanni and Roberto Livi and produced by Livi, and features vocals by Spanish performer Rocío Dúrcal. It was released as the album's lead single in Latin America and the United States. A Portuguese-language version of the song was also recorded as "Se Você Quer" with featured vocals from fellow Brazilian singer Fafá de Belém.

The song, about a couple that splits and want to get back together, peaked atop the Billboard's Latin Songs chart, becoming the third number-one song in the chart for both performers and has been included on several compilation albums. "Si Piensas, Si Quieres" earned a nomination for Latin Pop Song of the Year at the American Society of Composers, Authors and Publishers Awards of 1993.

== Background and release ==
Brazilian singer-songwriter Roberto Carlos recorded his Super Héroe released in late 1991 and produced by Roberto Livi. The album is the follow-up to the self-titled album by Carlos that was awarded the Grammy Award for Best Latin Pop Performance in 1989. Carlos was joined by Spanish singer-songwriter Rocío Dúrcal on the recording of "Si Piensas, Si Quieres", a song about a couple that splits and want to get back together. Upon release in late 1991, the song became a success peaking at the top of the Billboard's Latin Songs chart (formerly Hot Latin Tracks), becoming the third number-one single for Carlos in the chart following "Si El Amor Se Va" ("If Love Goes Away") (1988) and "Abre las Ventanas al Amor" ("Open the Windows for Love") (1990), and also the third for Dúrcal after "La Guirnalda" ("The Garland") (1986) and "Como Tu Mujer" ("As Your Woman") (1989).

"Si Piensas, Si Quieres" has been included on several compilation albums released by Carlos and Dúrcal. Following Dúrcal's passing in 2006 the track was added to Una Estrella en el Cielo, a collection of duets recorded by Dúrcal with Juan Gabriel, Julio Iglesias and Joaquín Sabina among others. Also on the albums Amor Eterno: Los Éxitos (2006), Duetos (2009) and Eternamente (2012), released by Dúrcal, the song can be found. Carlos included the track on Pájaro Hérido: Linea Azul, Vol. 10 (2003) and Antología: Todos los Grandes Éxitos (2006).

== Chart performance ==
"Si Piensas, Si Quieres" was released as the lead single from Super Héroe. The track debuted in the Billboard Latin Songs chart at number 35 in the week of 7 December 1991, climbing to the top ten two weeks later. "Si Piensas, Si Quieres" peaked at number one on 29 February 1992, replacing "Inolvidable" by Mexican performer Luis Miguel and being succeeded by "Nada Se Compara Contigo" by Salvadoran singer-songwriter Álvaro Torres, one week later. "Si Piensas, Si Quieres" ended 1992 as the seventh best performing Latin single of the year in the United States and was nominated for Latin Pop Song of the Year at the American Society of Composers, Authors and Publishers Awards of 1993. In November 1999, "Si Piensas, Si Quieres" was labeled as one of the "hottest tracks" for Sony Discos in a list including the most successful songs released by the label since the launching of the Billboard Hot Latin Tracks chart in 1986.
