= Buenos Amigos =

Single by Álvaro Torres and Selena

from the album Nada Se Compara Contigo
- Released: 1992
- Recorded: August 1991
- Studio: San Antonio Studios (Van Nuys, CA)
- Genre: Pop
- Length: 3:49
- Label: EMI Latin Capitol Latin
- Songwriter: Alvaro Torres
- Producer: Enrique Elizondo

Álvaro Torres singles chronology
"Nada Se Compara Contigo" (1991)	"Buenos Amigos" (1992)	"He Vivido Esperando Por Ti" (1992)

Selena singles chronology
"Baila Esta Cumbia" (1990)	"Buenos Amigos" (1991)	"La Carcacha" (1992)

Music video
- "Buenos Amigos" on YouTube

"Buenos Amigos" ("Good Friends") is a down-tempo, pop ballad duet recorded by Salvadoran recording artist Álvaro Torres and American recording artist Selena for Torres' sixth studio album Nada Se Compara Contigo (1991). The song was released by EMI Latin in 1992, as the album's second single. Its lyrics explore a friendship built on the strong, unrequited feelings of the male narrator. Torres composed "Buenos Amigos" after attending a showcase event at which Selena was performing.

Critics praised the song for being Selena's first number one, while others complimented its ballad-like feeling. According to Billboard, the recording began Selena's career as a dominant Latin chart artist. It was credited for the increased airplay Selena received on regional Mexican and Tejano radio stations, which had previously dismissed her recordings. Selena and Torres were nominated at the 1992 Billboard Music Video Awards and the 1992 Tejano Music Awards. "Buenos Amigos" peaked at number one on the US Billboard Hot Latin Songs chart; it was Torres' second number one in his career, and Selena's first. The single's accompanying music video featured Torres and Selena backed by an orchestra. Cover versions of the song were recordings by Mariana Seoane and Pablo Montero, Tairon and Anaís, and Lucero Terrazas.

== Background and release ==
"Buenos Amigos" was written by Salvadoran recording artist Álvaro Torres and produced by Enrique Elizondo. Originally the song was intended to be sung with Verónica Castro, but then Torres left his previous record company. After seeing American Tejano pop singer Selena perform at a showcase event, Torres immediately wanted to record a duet with her. He said in Selena Remembered; a documentary about her career, " ... she had an attractive way about her that was always present. We got along very well and a friendship developed from that point on. Several months later I wrote a song which I thought would be good to record a duet with Selena." "Buenos Amigos" was recorded for Torres' tenth studio album Nada Se Compara Contigo (1991).

"Buenos Amigos" has been included on several compilation albums released by Torres and Selena. Following Selena's death in 1995, the track has been included on Ones (2002), Momentos Intimos (2004), and La Leyenda (2010). Torres included the track on Mis Mejores Canciones: 12 Super Exitos (1993), El Angel de la Ternura (1997), Solo Para Enamorados: 16 Exitos (2000), Solo Lo Mejor: 20 Exitos (2001), 30 Exitos Insuperables (2003), 15 de Coleccion (2004), Romanticos Por Siempre (2005), and Lo Esencial De Alvaro Torres (2006). During an interview with La Prensa, Torres said, "I invited her to sing with me when she was not well-known, and I wrote the song "Buenos Amigos"; that song brings back memories. People will never forget Selena and that tune is one of my favorites."

== Composition ==
Buenos Amigos
"Buenos Amigos" is a duet with Selena and Alvaro Torres. A pop ballad, which makes use of orchestra-instrumentation, became Selena's first number one single. According to critics, it helped launch her career in the United States.

"Buenos Amigos" is a Spanish-language, down-tempo pop ballad. It makes use of orchestra instruments including strings, flute, French horn, percussion, a brass section, and bass drum performed in a rhythmical beat. Torres sings the first verse, telling his friend she is an unreachable dream and that he loves her. His friend Selena replies, telling him how she does not feel the same way. During the bridge, both narrators say that if they shared the same feelings their love would be an ecstasy, but because their feelings are different they believe being friends is better than losing each other.

Torres sings the second verse, telling Selena that he will wait for her, reasoning that he likes having an illusion and believing that she loves him. He then tells her he does not care how long he has to wait. Selena replies, telling him how beautiful his responses are, which makes her feel she is falling in love. Selena states that she stops herself from making a mistake that could hurt her. Torres and Selena repeat the song's chorus before the song concludes.

== Critical response ==
"Buenos Amigos" received a positive response from music critics. In his book Latin Sensations, Herón Márquez said the commercial success of "Buenos Amigos" helped Selena become a household name among Latinos in the United States. Angie Chabram-Dernersesian said "Buenos Amigos" was a "hit single", while writing about Selena's collaborations in her book The Chicana/o Cultural Studies Reader. Suzanne Michele Bourgoin said the track was a "breakthrough hit" for Selena, in her book Encyclopedia of World Biography: Supplement A Z. Lorena Flores of The Dallas Morning News called "Buenos Amigos" a "classic". An editor from El Diario de Hoy said "Buenos Amigos" is a "romantic track". An editor from Onet.pl named "Buenos Amigos" as one of Selena's biggest hits. Billboard magazine called it a "pop ballad" and said it became her first big hit single. Joe Nick Patoski called the recording "a pretty if somewhat insipid ballad" in his book about Selena's life. It was recognized as one of the best-performing songs of the year at the 1994 BMI Latin Awards.

== Music video and legacy ==
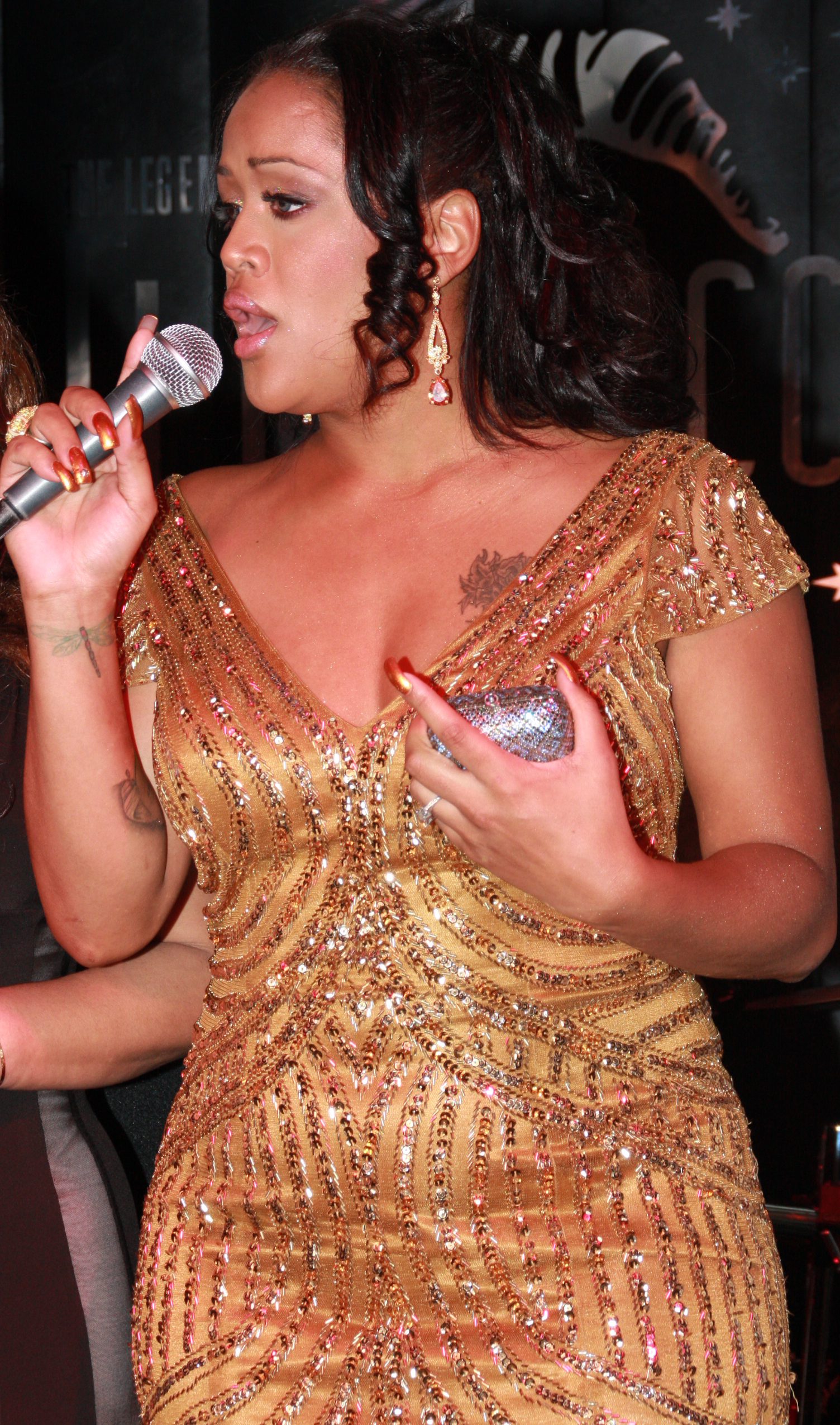
Dominican singer Anaís recorded the song with Tairon in 2005.

The music video for "Buenos Amigos" was filmed in San Antonio, Texas in August 1991. It features both artists, who are shown walking around, singing the song with an orchestra playing in the background. "Buenos Amigos" was Selena's first music video. It was included on the DVD set of Selena's 2005 compilation album Unforgettable. Deborah Parédez said the music video was "sophisticated".

The music video for "Buenos Amigos" earned Selena and Torres two nominations at the 1992 Billboard Music Video Awards. The track was nominated for "Duo of the Year" at the 1992 Tejano Music Awards. Parédez said the track enabled Selena to tour the west and east coasts of the United States. John Lannert of Billboard magazine said "Buenos Amigos" began Selena's career as a dominating Latin chart artist. According to John Lannert, the song was helped by increased airplay on regional Mexican and Tejano radio stations, which had previously dismissed Selena's recordings.

Mariana Seoane and Pablo Montero performed "Buenos Amigos" as part of the Selena ¡VIVE! tribute concert in 2005. Tairon recorded the song with Dominican singer Anaís for the compilation album Con Un Sueña...Objetivo Fama (2005). Mexican singer Lucero Terrazas, recorded the track for her album Cada Vez Que Me Ves (2007).

== Chart performance ==
"Buenos Amigos" debuted at number 30 on the US Billboard Hot Latin Songs (formerly Hot Latin Tracks) on the issue dated 11 April 1992. It entered the top 10 three weeks later. It peaked at number one nine weeks later on the issue dated 6 June 1992, replacing "No Sé Tú" by Luis Miguel and was succeeded by José Luis Rodríguez and Julio Iglesias's song "Torero" a week later. "Buenos Amigos" remained at number two for three consecutive weeks. This gave Torres his second number one single after "Nada Se Compara Contigo" which peaked at number one the same year. "Buenos Amigos" gave Selena her first number-one song in their career. "Buenos Amigos" remained on the charts for 17 consecutive weeks, exiting on the issue dated 1 August 1992. "Buenos Amigos" received more airplay when it fell to number two than it did when it was at number one. According to Billboard magazine, this was not enough for the recording to remain at number one.

=== Weekly charts ===
Chart (1992)	Peak position
US Billboard Hot Latin Tracks	1
Chile (El Siglo de Torreón)	3

=== Year-end charts ===
Chart (1992)	Peak position
US Billboard Hot Latin Tracks	15

== Certifications ==
Region	Certification	Certified units/sales
United States (RIAA)	Gold (Latin)	30,000^{‡}
^{‡} Sales+streaming figures based on certification alone.

== Track listing ==
- CD single
1. "Buenos Amigos" – 4:46

== Personnel ==
Credits adapted from Nada Se Compara Contigo.

- Selena—vocals
- Alvaro Torres—vocals, writer
- Enrique Elizondo—producer
- Brian "Red" Moore—mixer
- A.B. Quintanilla III—arranger

== See also ==
- List of number-one Billboard Hot Latin Tracks of 1992

== Books ==
- Bourgoin, Suzanne Michele (1998), Encyclopedia of World Biography: Supplement A Z, Gale Group, ISBN 141445905X
- Dernersesian, Angie Chabram (2006), The Chicana/o Cultural Studies Reader, Routledge, ISBN 0415235154
- Márquez, Herón (2001), Latin Sensations, Sagebrush Education Resources, ISBN 0613818628
