= Destiny (Barrio Boyzz album) =

Studio album by Barrio Boyzz
- Released: October 17, 2000
- Recorded: 1999–00
- Genre: Latin rap
- Label: SBK Records; Barrio Soul/Barrio Records

Barrio Boyzz chronology
Ven a Mi (1997)	Destiny (2000)	Destino (2001)

Professional ratings
Review scores
Source	Rating
AllMusic	3/5 stars

Destiny is the sixth studio album by Latin rap group Barrio Boyzz. It was released on October 17, 2000 through SBK Records.

The majority of the songs are Spanish ballads, though it also includes a cover of Foreigner's 1984 hit single, "I Want to Know What Love Is". Unlike their previous releases the album failed to chart and the group disbanded shortly afterwards.

== Track listing ==
1. "Quiero Saber Que Es Amor"
2. "Vuelve Conmigo"
3. "Nuestro Destino"
4. "Obsession"
5. "Te Olvidé"
6. "De Ti Depende"
7. "Summer Señorita"
8. "Déjame Amarte Más"
9. "Déjame"
10. "Dame Tu Amor"
11. "From Now On"
12. "Destiny"
13. "I Want to Know What Love Is"
