= Una Vez Mas (Barrio Boyzz song) =

Single by Barrio Boyzz

from the album Una Vez Mas
- Released: 1995
- Recorded: 1994
- Length: 4:46
- Label: EMI Latin
- Songwriters: Marco Flores, KC Porter
- Producer: KC Porter

Barrio Boyzz singles chronology
"No Me Dejes" (1995)	"Una Vez Mas" (1995)	"How We Roll" (1996)

"Una Vez Mas" (English: "Once Again") is a song by Latin pop group the Barrio Boyzz for their third studio album of the same name. It was written by Marco Flores and KC Porter, while the latter produced the piece. The song was released as the lead single by EMI Latin in 1995. The recording received a positive reception from music critics. The single peaked at number two on the US Billboard Latin Pop Songs chart, number five on the US Top Latin Songs chart, and number eight on the US Tropical Songs chart.

== Background ==
Barrio Boyzz "Una Vez Mas"
A 21 second sample of the track "Una Vez Mas".

"Una Vez Mas" was written by Marco Flores and KC Porter. The Barrio Boyzz recorded the song for their third studio album, Una Vez Mas (1995). It was released as the lead single by EMI Latin that same year. Paul Verna of Billboard called "Una Vez Mas" a "guaranteed smash [hit]". John Lannert, also from Billboard, called the recording the "latest hit" in his 22 April 1995 review.

== Chart history ==
The single had extensive airplay in Spain, but failed to chart in that country. "Una Vez Mas" debuted at number 15 on the US Billboard Latin Pop Songs chart on the week of 8 April 1995. It spent a total of 10 weeks on the chart, peaking at number two on the week of 6 May 1995, it slipped from that position, however, it reached number two once again on the week of 3 June 1995. The single debuted at number 11 on the US Billboard Tropical Songs chart on the week of 6 May 1995. "Una Vez Mas" peaked at number five on the US Billboard Top Latin Songs chart on the week of 13 May 1995 and remained there for two weeks.

Chart (1995)	Peak position
US Hot Latin Songs (Billboard)	5
US Latin Pop Airplay (Billboard)	2
US Tropical Songs (Billboard)	8

== Credits and personnel ==
Credits adapted from the Allmusic and Una Vez Mas liner notes.

- Barrio Boyzz – vocals
- Marco Flores – songwriting
- KC Porter – songwriting
- Joel Peskin - saxophone
