= Crazy Coolin' =

Studio album by Barrio Boyzz
- Released: 1992
- Recorded: 1991
- Genre: Latin rap
- Label: SBK Records

Barrio Boyzz chronology
Crazy Coolin' (1992)	Donde Quiera Que Estés (1994)

Crazy Coolin is the debut album by Latin rap group Barrio Boyzz. It was released in 1992 through SBK Records. Its lead single "Muy Suavemente" peaked at number 36 on the US Hot Latin Tracks chart.

== Track listing ==
1. "A Chance for Love"
2. "The Love That You Deserve"
3. "I'll Treat You Right"
4. "Crazy Coolin'"
5. "With You"
6. "Thought You Were Mine"
7. "Latin Groove"
8. "Whisper to Me"
9. "Taste of Love"
10. "O' My Goodness"
11. "Deeper"
12. "Muy Suavemente"
13. "Y Eres Tu"
14. "The Love That You Deserve"
