= Reencuentro (Álvaro Torres album) =

1995 studio album by Álvaro Torres

Studio album by Álvaro Torres
- Released: March 7, 1995
- Recorded: 1994–1995
- Studios: Entourage Studios, (North Hollywood)
- Genres: Latin pop; soft rock; latin ballad
- Length: 36:33
- Language: Spanish
- Label: EMI Latin
- Producers: Álvaro Torres; Víctor Torres

Álvaro Torres chronology
Amor del Alma (1993)	Reencuentro (1995)	En Busca del Amor (1996)

Singles from Reencuentro
- 1. "Reencuentro" Released: January 23, 1995; 2. "Al Acecho" Released: May 29, 1995

Reencuentro (English: Reunion) is the 13th album recorded by the Salvadoran singer-songwriter Álvaro Torres, released by EMI Latin on March 7, 1995. It was produced by Torres and Víctor Sanchez, recorded in 1994 in Entourage Studios, North Hollywood, Los Angeles.

The opening track, "Reencuentro", which was sung featuring the Puerto Rican-Colombian band Barrio Boyzz, was a success in Latin America and the United States, reaching the position 11 on the Billboard Hot Latin Tracks chart and number 3 in Latin Pop Airplay chart.

== Track listing ==
All tracks are written by Álvaro Torres.

No.	Title	Length
1.	"Reencuentro" (featuring Barrio Boyzz)	4:59
2.	"Al Acecho"	4:11
3.	"Tú Te Lo Pierdes"	3:42
4.	"Chiquita Mía"	3:49
5.	"Mi Otro Yo"	4:08
6.	"Se Terminó"	3:55
7.	"Regresaré a la Cama"	4:05
8.	"Ay Muñeca!"	4:16
9.	"Por Ti, Todo!"	4:11
10.	"Voy a Buscar a Alguien"	3:12
Total length:		36:33

== Personnel ==
Credits adapted from Reencuentro liner notes.

Vocals

- Álvaro Torres – lead vocals
- Barrio Boyzz – lead vocals (track 1)
- Francis Benítez – backing vocals
- Kenny O'Brien – backing vocals
- Thania Sanchez – backing vocals
- Roberto Zavalo – backing vocals

Musicians

- César Benítez – keyboards, piano, sequencing
- Steve Durnin – french horn
- Cesar Espinoza – congas, güiro, tambouras
- Phillip D. Feather – oboe
- Ramon Flores – trumpet
- Grant Geissman – acoustic guitar, electric guitar
- Matt Germaine – saxophones
- Marty Jabara – percussion, timpani
- Eric Jorgensen – trombone
- John Jorgenson – mandolin
- Peter Kent – concertmaster
- Tony Lujan – trumpet
- John Schreiner – piano
- Amy Shulman – harp
- Joe Stone – oboe
- David Stout – trombone
- Roberto Vally – bass guitar
- John Yoakum – tenor saxophone

Production

- Álvaro Torres – production
- Victor Sanchez – production, mixing
- Teresa Caffin – production assistance, engineering assistance
- Cappy Japngie – engineering assistance
- Terri Wong – engineering assistance

Recording

- Recorded at Entourage Studios, North Hollywood.
