= Nada Se Compara Contigo =

Studio album by Álvaro Torres
- Released: November 19, 1991
- Recorded: 1990–1991
- Studio: Santa Fe Recording Studios (Van Nuys, California)
- Genre: Latin pop
- Length: 41:28
- Label: EMI Music Latin
- Producer: Enrique Elizondo

Álvaro Torres chronology
Si Estuvieras Conmigo (1990)	Nada Se Compara Contigo (1991)	Homenaje a México (1992)

Singles from Nada Se Compara Contigo
- 1. "Nada Se Compara Contigo" Released: August 19, 1991; 2. "Buenos Amigos (with Selena)" Released: October 28, 1991; 3. "He Vivido Esperando Por Ti" Released: January 6, 1992; 4. "Te Olvidaré" Released: May 4, 1992; 5. "Te Dejo Libre" Released: July 6, 1992; 6. "Ámame" Released: August 17, 1992

Nada Se Compara Contigo (English: Nothing Compares to You) is the tenth studio album recorded by Salvadoran singer-songwriter Álvaro Torres. It was released by EMI Music Latin on November 19, 1991 (see 1991 in music). The album was produced again by Enrique Elizondo. The album received a nomination for Pop Album of the Year at the 5th Annual Lo Nuestro Awards.

== Track listing ==
All tracks are written by Álvaro Torres

No.	Title	Length
1.	"Nada Se Compara Contigo"	4:48
2.	"Buenos Amigos" (duet with Selena)	4:46
3.	"He Vivido Esperando Por Ti"	4:24
4.	"Te Olvidaré"	4:29
5.	"A Tu Ritmo"	3:30
6.	"Te Dejo Libre"	4:39
7.	"Ámame"	3:23
8.	"Estoy Enamorado de Tí"	3:22
9.	"Me Duele a Morir"	4:50
10.	"Con Todo Mi Amor"	3:43

== Personnel ==
Credits adapted from Nada Se Compara Contigo liner notes. Musicians

- Álvaro Torres – lead vocals, composing
- Selena – lead vocals (track 2)
- Chuck Anderson – arrangements
- Daniel Ash – composing
- Kevin Haskins – composing
- David J – composing
- A.B. Quintanilla III – arrangements (track 2)

Production

- Enrique Elizondo – Record producer
- Bob Biles – engineering
- Chris Morrison – engineering assistance
- Brian "Red" Moore – mixer (track 2)

Recording

- Recorded at Santa Fe Recording Studios, Van Nuys, California

== Charts ==
=== Weekly charts ===
Chart (1992)	Peak position
US Billboard Latin Pop Albums	2

=== Year-end charts ===
Chart (1992)	Peak position
US Latin Pop Albums (Billboard)	4
