= List of number-one Billboard Regional Mexican Songs of 2005 =

The Billboard Regional Mexican Songs chart ranks the best performing Regional Mexican singles in the United States. Published weekly by Billboard magazine, it ranks the "most popular regional Mexican songs, ranked by radio airplay audience impressions as measured by Nielsen Music."

== Chart history ==
Key
†	Indicates number 1 on Billboard's year-end regional Mexican chart

Issue date	Song	Artist(s)	Ref.
January 1	"El virus del amor"	Los Tucanes de Tijuana	
January 8	"Está llorando mi corazón"	Beto y sus Canarios	
January 15	"El virus del amor"	Los Tucanes de Tijuana	
January 22	"El virus del amor"	Los Tucanes de Tijuana	
January 29	"El virus del amor"	Los Tucanes de Tijuana	
February 5	"El virus del amor"	Los Tucanes de Tijuana	
February 12	"El virus del amor"	Los Tucanes de Tijuana	
February 19	"Hoy como ayer" †	Conjunto Primavera	
February 26	"Hoy como ayer" †	Conjunto Primavera	
March 5	"Aire"	Intocable	
March 12	"Aire"	Intocable	
March 19	"Hoy como ayer" †	Conjunto Primavera	
March 26	"Hoy como ayer" †	Conjunto Primavera	
April 2	"Hoy como ayer" †	Conjunto Primavera	
April 9	"Hoy como ayer" †	Conjunto Primavera	
April 16	"Aire"	Intocable	
April 23	"Hoy como ayer" †	Conjunto Primavera	
April 30	"Hoy como ayer" †	Conjunto Primavera	
May 7	"Hoy como ayer" †	Conjunto Primavera	
May 14	"Hoy como ayer" †	Conjunto Primavera	
May 21	"Hoy como ayer" †	Conjunto Primavera	
May 28	"La sorpresa"	Los Tigres del Norte	
June 4	"Ni en defensa propia"	Los Temerarios	
June 11	"Ni en defensa propia"	Los Temerarios	
June 18	"La sorpresa"	Los Tigres del Norte	
June 25	"Eres divina"	Patrulla 81	
July 2	"Eres divina"	Patrulla 81	
July 9	"Eres divina"	Patrulla 81	
July 16	"Eres divina"	Patrulla 81	
July 23	"Dueño de ti"	Sergio Vega "El Shaka"	
July 30	"Eres divina"	Patrulla 81	
August 6	"Ya me habían dicho"	Lupillo Rivera	
August 13	"Ya me habían dicho"	Lupillo Rivera	
August 20	"Eres divina"	Patrulla 81	
August 27	"Eres divina"	Patrulla 81	
September 3	"Eres divina"	Patrulla 81	
September 10	"Eres divina"	Patrulla 81	
September 17	"Eres divina"	Patrulla 81	
September 24	"No puedo olvidarte"	Beto y sus Canarios	
October 1	"No puedo olvidarte"	Beto y sus Canarios	
October 8	"No puedo olvidarte"	Beto y sus Canarios	
October 15	"No puedo olvidarte"	Beto y sus Canarios	
October 22	"Aún sigues siendo mía"	Conjunto Primavera	
October 29	"Aún sigues siendo mía"	Conjunto Primavera	
November 5	"No puedo olvidarte"	Beto y sus Canarios	
November 12	"No puedo olvidarte"	Beto y sus Canarios	
November 19	"No puedo olvidarte"	Beto y sus Canarios	
November 26	"No puedo olvidarte"	Beto y sus Canarios	
December 3	"No puedo olvidarte"	Beto y sus Canarios	
December 10	"No puedo olvidarte"	Beto y sus Canarios	
December 17	"No puedo olvidarte"	Beto y sus Canarios	
December 24	"No puedo olvidarte"	Beto y sus Canarios	
December 31	"No puedo olvidarte"	Beto y sus Canarios	
