= Ven a Mí =

Ven a Mi

Studio album by Barrio Boyzz
- Released: 1997
- Recorded: 1996–97
- Genre: Latin rap
- Label: SBK Records

Barrio Boyzz chronology
How We Roll (1995)	Ven a Mi (1997)	Destiny (2000)

Ven a Mi is the fifth studio album by Latin rap group Barrio Boyzz. It was released in 1997 through SBK Records.

== Track listing ==
1. "Rico"
2. "No Quiero Verte Llorar"
3. "Tu Manera de Amar"
4. "Es Cosa del Amor"
5. "Depende de Ti"
6. "Se Me Fue Mi Vida (A Duo con Rikarena)"
7. "Ven a Mi"
8. "Entre los Dos"
9. "Sere Tu Rio (I'll Be Your River)"
10. "Loquera"
11. "Si Eres Tu"

== Charts ==
Chart (1997)	Peak position
US Top Latin Albums (Billboard)	23
US Latin Pop Albums (Billboard)	9
