= Donde Quiera Que Estés (album) =

Donde Quiera Que Estes

Studio album by Barrio Boyzz
- Released: September 21, 1993
- Recorded: 1992–1993
- Genre: Latin rap
- Label: SBK Records

Barrio Boyzz chronology
Crazy Coolin' (1991)	Donde Quiera Que Estes (1993)	Una Vez Mas (1995)

Donde Quiera Que Estes is the second studio album by Latin rap group Barrio Boyzz and jointly featured Selena. It was released on September 21, 1993 through SBK Records.

== Track listing ==
1. "Cerca De Ti"
2. "Días Como Hoy"
3. "Te Amaré"
4. "America"
5. "Una Noche De Amor"
6. "Donde Quiera Que Estés"
7. "Eres Tú"
8. "Muy Suavemente"
9. "Conga"
10. "Una Noche de Amor"

== Charts ==
Chart (1993)	Peak position
US Top Latin Albums (Billboard)	15
US Latin Pop Albums (Billboard)	7
