= Ni Tú Ni Ella =

1990 song by Álvaro Torres

Single by Álvaro Torres

from the album Si Estuvieras Conmigo
- Released: 1990
- Recorded: 1989–90
- Studio: Rusk Sound Studios (Los Angeles)
- Genre: Latin pop
- Length: 4:57
- Label: EMI Latin
- Songwriter(s): Álvaro Torres
- Producer(s): Bebu Silvetti

Álvaro Torres singles chronology
"Por lo Mucho Que Te Amor" (1989)	"Ni Tú Ni Ella" (1990)	"Si Estuvieras Conmigo" (1990)

"Ni Tú Ni Ella" (Neither You Nor She) is a single by Salvadoran singer Álvaro Torres released on 1990 through EMI Latin as part of Torres' ninth studio album Si Estuvieras Conmigo. The song was written by Torres, produced by Bebu Silvetti and it was recorded in Rusk Sound Studios, Los Angeles.

The song was a success in Latin America and the United States, peaking at number 3 in April 1990 on the Billboard Hot Latin Tracks chart.

== Background ==
"Ni Tú Ni Ella" is an mid-tempo latin pop song written by Álvaro Torres. The song tells the story of a man's indecision about choosing between his couple and his lover, not wanting any of the two to suffer.

Torres said that the inspiration of the song came from the coincidence of two female friends of him. When he was in Los Angeles he had two female friends in the extremes of the city, and he thought they would never meet because of the distance, but finally that situation happened and he had to face it.

== Track listing ==
All tracks are written by Álvaro Torres

7" single PTS-1028-90
No.	Title	Length
1.	"Ni Tú Ni Ella"	4:57

== Personnel ==
Credits adapted from Si Estuvieras Conmigo liner notes.

Vocals

- Álvaro Torres – lead vocals
- Kenny O'Brien – backing vocals
- Maria Del Rey – backing vocals
- Michel Jimenez – backing vocals
- Nina Swan – backing vocals

Musicians

- Bebu Silvetti – arrangements, conducting, piano, keyboards
- José Peña – bass guitar
- Ezra Kliger – coordination
- Suzie Katayama – copyist
- Grant Geissman – guitar
- John Yoakum – tenor saxophone
- Alan Kaplan – trombone
- Charlie Davis – trumpet
- Ramon Flores – trumpet

Production

- Bebu Silvetti – production
- Elton Ahi – mixing
- Eric Scheda – mixing
- Boon Heng Tam – engineering assistance
- Gustavo Borner – engineering assistance

Recording

- Recorded and mixed at Rusk Sound Studios, Los Angeles

== Charts ==
=== Weekly charts ===
Chart (1990)	Peak position
US Hot Latin Tracks (Billboard)	3

=== Year-end charts ===
Chart (1990)	Peak position
US Hot Latin Tracks (Billboard)	26

== Covers ==
Puerto Rican merengue band Zona Roja covered the song on their 1992 album Peligroso Sabor.... Their version peaked at #36 on the Hot Latin Songs chart.
