= Reencuentro (song) =

1995 song by Álvaro Torres

Single by Álvaro Torres feat. Barrio Boyzz

from the album Reencuentro
- Language: Spanish
- English title: Reunion
- Released: 1995
- Recorded: 1994
- Studio: Entourage Studios (North Hollywood, CA)
- Genre: Pop; folk
- Length: 4:59
- Label: EMI
- Songwriter(s): Álvaro Torres
- Producer(s): Álvaro Torres; Víctor Torres

Álvaro Torres singles chronology
"Contigo Sí" (1994)	"Reencuentro" (1995)	"Al Acecho" (1995)

Music video
- "Reencuentro" on YouTube

"Reencuentro" (transl. "Reunion"), also known as "Patria Querida" (transl. "Beloved Homeland"), is a song performed by Salvadoran singer-songwriter Álvaro Torres featuring Puerto Rican-Colombian band Barrio Boyzz. It was produced by Álvaro Torres and Víctor Torres, recorded in 1994 in Entourage Studios, North Hollywood, CA, and released on Torres' album Reencuentro in 1995. The song samples the traditional Central America melody of the "Torito Pinto dance". "Reencuentro" is a patriotic song, manifesting the impediment for distance and the yearning to return to the country where the subject belongs.

In April 1995, the song was a success in Latin America and the United States, reaching the position 11 on the Billboard Hot Latin Tracks chart and number 3 in the Latin Pop Airplay chart. The music video was nominated in Lo Nuestro Awards in the category "Video of the year". It was recognized as one of the best-performing songs of the year at the 1996 BMI Latin Awards. "Reencuentro" was also included in the 1996 album Voces Unidas, a project made for the Olympic Games "Atlanta 1996".

== Composition and lyrics ==
"Reencuentro" was written and composed by Álvaro Torres, being described as a mid-tempo pop ballad. The song is composed in the key of C major and follows the chord progression of C–Em–F–Am–Dm–G7–Em–Am–G–C–F–Dm–G7 in the verses, while in the chorus changes to C–Em–Dm–G7–F–G–F–Dm–G7.

Torres said "[it's] a song I wrote for my beloved homeland, El Salvador, but at the same time, it has the advantage that [...] every immigrant [can] make it theirs, because it is the sentiment proper of an immigrant".

The song begins with the traditional melody of the "Torito Pinto dance" performed with a flute. In the first verse Torres's voice is heard accompanied by background stringed instruments; then comes the drums and the voices of Barrio Boyzz, which remain throughout the rest of the verse until the chorus. In the second verse, Torres's voice returns, keeping only his voice until the choir, then entering Barrio Boyzz repeating the chorus until the end of the song.

"Reencuentro" talks about nostalgia and the joy of meeting again in the country where it comes from, also recognizing the suffering that the country has passed through the years, due to wars and violence.

== Music video ==
The music video for "Reencuentro" was recorded in San Miguel de Allende, Guanajuato, Mexico, along with Barrio Boyzz. The clip begins showing settlers of an old town and children playing, then Torres is shown singing the beginning of the song. Then, Barrio Boyzz appears performing the song, while exchanging images of old people, children playing, violists, a room with candles, and people holding crosses. Finally, Barrio Boyzz and Torres sing together the song along with all the villagers.

In 1995, the music video was nominated in Lo Nuestro Awards in the category "Video of the Year", but lost to Luis Miguel's "La Media Vuelta".

== Personnel ==
Credits adapted from Reencuentro liner notes.

Vocals

- Álvaro Torres – lead vocals
- Barrio Boyzz – lead vocals (track 1)

Musicians

- César Benítez – keyboards, piano, sequencing
- Steve Durnin – french horn
- Cesar Espinoza – congas, güiro, tambouras
- Phillip D. Feather – oboe
- Ramon Flores – trumpet
- Grant Geissman – acoustic guitar, electric guitar
- Matt Germaine – saxophones
- Marty Jabara – percussion, timpani
- Eric Jorgensen – trombone
- John Jorgenson – mandoline
- Peter Kent – concert master
- Tony Lujan – trumpet
- John Schreiner – piano
- Amy Shulman – harp
- Joe Stone – oboe
- David Stout – trombone
- Roberto Vally – bass guitar
- John Yoakum – tenor saxophone

Production

- Álvaro Torres – production
- Victor Sanchez – production, mixing
- Teresa Caffin – production assistance, engineering assistance
- Cappy Japngie – engineering assistance
- Terri Wong – engineering assistance

Recording

- Recorded at Entourage Studios, North Hollywood, CA

== Charts ==
Chart (1995)	Peak position
US Hot Latin Tracks (Billboard)	11
US Latin Airplay (Billboard)	11
US Latin Pop Airplay (Billboard)	3
