= Marisela =

Mexican-American singer (born 1966)

Marisela Esqueda
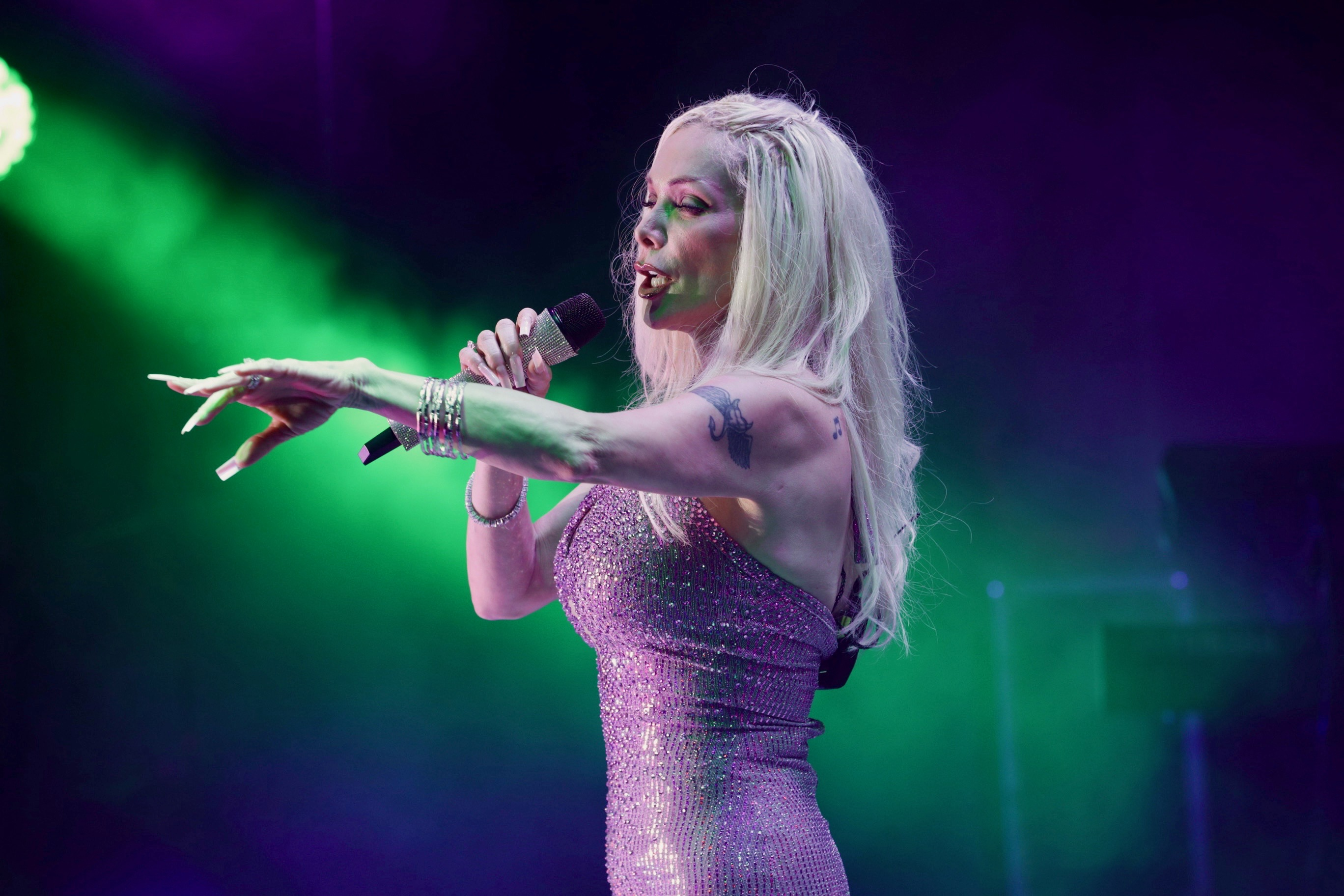
- Marisela performing live, 2025

Background information
- Born: April 24, 1966 (age 60); Los Angeles, California, U.S.
- Genres: Latin pop, ballads
- Occupations: Singer, songwriter
- Years active: 1984–present
- Labels: Melody / Discos Melody; Ariola Records; Fonovisa Records; Sony Music / Sony BMG; Universal Music Group

Marisela Esqueda (born April 24, 1966), known professionally as Marisela, is an American singer and songwriter. She is also referred to as "La Dama de Hierro" ('The Iron Lady'). Her debut album, Sin Él, entered at No. 16 on the first Billboard Latin Albums Chart.

== Early life ==
Marisela was born in Los Angeles, California, to Mexican immigrant parents. She was raised in a bilingual household and began singing at a young age. She has cited Rocío Dúrcal and Juan Gabriel among her musical influences.

== Career ==
=== 1980s ===
Marisela began her career in 1984. Her debut album, Sin Él (1984), was produced by Marco Antonio Solís and included the title track as its lead single. That same year, she recorded a duet, "La Pareja Ideal", with Solís.

=== 1990s ===
In 1990, she released the album Marisela, which included the single "Ya No." The song reached No. 1 on Billboard's Hot Latin Songs chart. That same year, "Ya No" was featured in the Boaz Davidson film Salsa (1988). Marisela appeared in the film, performing alongside Celia Cruz and Tito Puente, which exposed her to new audiences within Latin pop.

=== 2000s–present ===
Marisela continued recording and touring through the 2000s and 2010s in Mexico, the United States, and Latin America. She released several compilations and live albums. In 2025, she undertook the EMPODERADA tour and released new music, including the single "Sola." In 2026, she was working on a duet album in collaboration with Universal Music. She has released 14 albums.

== Personal life ==
Marisela has a daughter, Marilyn Odessa, who is also a musical performer. The two have appeared together at concerts, including performances in Portland and Tijuana in 2025.

== Discography ==
Studio Albums
Name	Year
Sin el	1984
Completamente tuya	1985
Porque Tengo Ganas	1986
Marisela	1989
Hablemos claro	1990
Adiós amor	1992
Marisela con la Banda la Escamilla	1993
Borrón y cuenta nueva	1995
Voz y sentimiento	1997
En vivo Tu Dama de Hierro	1999
Historia de un amor – Boleros con trío	2000
La otra	2002
Éxitos con Banda	2005
Noches eternas	2007
El Marco De Mis Recuerdos	2011

- El Marco De Mis Recuerdos (released August 2, 2011, on iTunes)
1. "Tu cárcel"
2. "Que lástima"
3. "Tus mentiras"
4. "Este Adiós"
5. "El peor de mis fracasos"
6. "Me volví an accordar de ti"
7. "Navidad sin ti"
8. "Tienes Razón"
9. "Yo te necesito"
10. "Y ahora te vas"
11. "Dónde estás"

(All tracks are written by Marco Antonio Solís)

- Noches eternas (2007)
1. "Noches eternas" (Felipe Valdés Leal)
2. "Sola con mi soledad" (Aníbal Pastor)
3. "Ya no te vayas" (Marco Antonio Solís)
4. "Me gusta estar contigo" (Juan Gabriel)
5. "Completamente tuya" (Xavier Santos)
6. "Si no te hubieras ido" (Marco Antonio Solís)
7. "No me hablen de él" (Marisela Esqueda)
8. "Mi problema" (Aníbal Pastor)
9. "No puedo olvidarlo" (Marco Antonio Solís)
10. "Fue tan poco tu cariño" (Juan Gabriel)
11. "Sin él" (Marco Antonio Solís)
12. "Amor de los dos" (Gilberto Parra)
- Éxitos con Banda (2005)
1. Ámame (Xavier Santos)
2. Adiós amor (Marisela Esqueda)
3. Loca (Willie Nelson)
4. Total (Ray Pardomo)
5. Me desperté llorando (Leo Dan)
6. Quizás mañana (Juan Gabriel)
7. Nunca olvidaré (Marisela Esqueda)
8. Piel canela (Bobby Capó)
9. Amor tan mío (Víctor Yuñez Castillo)
10. Ya lo pagaras (José Aguiñada)
- La otra (2002)
1. Voy a quitarme el anillo (Rafael Ferro/Roberto Livi)
2. La otra (Erica Ender/Alejandro Jaén)
3. Te amo (Roberto Livi/ Rudy Pérez)
4. El baúl de los recuerdos (Rafael Ferro/Roberto Livi)
5. Hasta que te olvide (Rafael Ferro/Roberto Livi)
6. Flechazo de Cupido (R. Esparza)
7. Voy a comprar un CD (Roberto Livi/Rudy Pérez)
8. No me vas a matar (Virginia Faiad/Miguel O. Iacopetti/Luis Sarmiento)
9. No me lastima (Erica Ender/Alejandro Jaén)
10. El amor de mis amores (Juan Marcelo)
11. Y te voy a olvidar (Marco Flores)
12. El amor de mi vida (Gustavo Avigliano/F. Schiantarelli)
13. Voy a quitarme el anillo (Banda) (Rafael Ferro/Roberto Livi)
- Historia de un amor – Boleros con trío (2000)
1. Total (Ray Pardomo)
2. Tus Mentiras (Paublo Ibarra)
3. Piel canela (Bobby Capó)
4. Desvelo de amor (Rafael Hernández Marín)
5. Historia de un amor (Carlos Almarán)
6. Tonto (Armando Manzanero)
7. Cenizas (Wello Rivas)
8. Tus promesas de amor (Miguel Amadeo)
9. ¿De qué presumes? (Homero Aguilar)
10. Ilusión perdida (D. A. R.)
11. Quizás, quizás, quizás (Joe Davis/ Osvaldo Farrés)
12. Somos differentes (Ruiz/ Pablo Beltrán)
- En vivo Tu Dama de Hierro (1999)
1. Intro
2. Enamorada y herida (Xavier Santos)
3. Cariño mío, amigo mío (Aníbal Pastor)
4. Mi problema (Aníbal Pastor)
5. Completamente tuya/Sola con mi soledad/Si alguna vez (Xavier Santos/Aníbal Pastor/Roberto Bellester)
6. Tu dama de hierro (Aníbal Pastor)
7. Porque tengo ganas (Aníbal Pastor)
8. Y sé que vas a llorar (Carlos María)
9. Sin él (Marco Antonio Solís)
10. Vete con ella/Si no te hubieras ido/No puedo olvidarlo (Marco Antonio Solís)
11. El chico aquel (Marco Antonio Solís)
12. Un amor en el olvido (Víctor Franco)
13. Muriendo de amor (Xavier Santos)
14. Decídete (Marisela Esqueda)
15. Ya lo pagarás (José Aguiñada)
16. Y voy a ser feliz (Cortés, Xavier Santos)
17. Ya no (Bárbara George)
- Voz y sentimiento (1997)
1. Loca (Willie Nelson)
2. Ya lo pagarás (José Aguiñada)
3. Escríbeme (Marisela Esqueda)
4. Vuelve (Blanca Estela Zurita)
5. Vete con Dios (José Manuel Lozano)
6. Y a poco no (Blanca Estela Zurita)
7. Quizás mañana (Juan Gabriel)
8. Por tus mentiras (Ángel Castelo/Lenin García)
9. Fácil es perdonar (E. Jr. Aguilar)
10. Decídete (Marisela Esqueda)
11. Crazy (Willie Nelson)
- Borrón y cuenta nueva (1995)
1. Un amor en el olvido (Víctor Franco) (#21)
2. Me olvidaré de ti (Adolfo Ángel Alba)
3. Borrón y cuenta nueva (Elizardo "Chalo" Campos)
4. Tú mi niña (Víctor Franco)
5. Debo contar hasta diez (Orlando Gimenez/O. Jiménez/C. Nilson/ Dario Valles)
6. ¿Qué pensabas? (Anselmo Solís)
7. Que manera tan estúpida de amar (Víctor Franco)
8. No vayas a volver jamás (Angel Castelo/Gustavo Mendez)
9. No me vas a convencer (Lolita de la Colina)
10. Para nunca volver (Roberto Guardarrama)
- Marisela con la Banda la Escamilla (1993)
1. Ya no te vayas (Marco Antonio Solís)
2. Mi problema (Aníbal Pastor)
3. Completamente tuya (Xavier Santos)
4. Prefiero ir sola (Marco Antonio Solís)
5. Ahora no (Xavier Santos)
6. Siéntame, ámame, quiéreme (Xavier Santos)
7. Sola con mi soledad (Aníbal Pastor)
8. No puedo olvidarlo (Marco Antonio Solís)
9. Vete mejor (Marco Antonio Solís)
10. El chico aquel (Marco Antonio Solís)
- Adiós amor (1992)
1. Ámame (Cortés, Xavier Santos)
2. Adiós amor (Marisela Esqueda)
3. Me desperté llorando (Leo Dan)
4. Te devuelvo tu apellido (Eloy Monrouzeau) (#16)
5. Porque amo la música (Adrián Posse)
6. Nunca olvidaré (Marisela Esqueda)
7. Tonto corazón (Marisela Esqueda)
8. Amor tan mío (Víctor Yuñez Castillo)
9. Ven, acércate un poco (Tommy Boyce/Wes Farrel/Bobby Hart)
10. Si de mí te alejas (Kiko Campos/Fernado Riba)
- Hablemos claro (1990)
1. Y sé que vas a llorar (Carlos María) (#2)
2. Tú y yo (A. Martines. M. A. Valenzuela)
3. Cha-cha (Adele Bertei/ D. Bryant/William Shelby)
4. Vete de mí (Anselmo Solís)
5. A partir de hoy (Álvaro Torres) (#7)
6. Ya te olvidé (Anselmo Solís) (#14)
7. Tu adeudo (Graciela Carballo/Horacio Lanci)
8. En Cancún (Enrique Elizondo/Paul Gordon/Jay Gruska)
9. Hablemos claro (Aníbal Pastor)
10. Amor de compra y venta (Jorge Luis Borrego)
- Marisela (1989)
1. Amarte es genial (Graciela Carballo/Gilson/Joran) (#8)
2. Y voy a ser feliz (Cortés, Xavier Santos) (#6)
3. Ya no te quiero (Peter Bliss/Graciela Carballo)
4. O me quieres o me dejas (Roberto Bellester) (#38)
5. Ámame un poco más (Cortés, Xavier Santos)
6. Para volver an empezar (Graciela Carballo/Horacio Lanzi)
7. Ya no puedo volver contigo (Anselmo Solís) (#5)
8. Ya no (Bárbara George) (#1)
9. Demasiado Tarde (Josè Antonio Sosa) (#9)
10. Mi triste amiga (Cortés, Xavier Santos)
- Porque Tengo Ganas (1986) ARDC Music Division
1. Tu dama de hierro (Aníbal Pastor) (#2)
2. Porque Tengo Ganas (Aníbal Pastor) (#17)
3. Yo sé que tú (Roberto Bellester)
4. Quisiera detener el tiempo (Aníbal Pastor)
5. A escondidas (Roberto Bellester)
6. El fin de nuestro amor (Eusebio Cortés)
7. Hazme tuya (Álvaro Torres) (#20)
8. Arrepentida (Aníbal Pastor) (#24)
9. Quédate a mi lado (Aníbal Pastor)
10. Si alguna vez (Roberto Bellester)
- Completamente tuya (1985)
1. Siénteme, ámame, quiéreme (Cortés, Xavier Santos)
2. Así de fácil (Xavier Santos)
3. Ahora no (Xavier Santos)
4. Enamorada y herida (Xavier Santos)
5. Mi problema (Aníbal Pastor) (#41)
6. Completamente tuya (Xavier Santos)
7. Muriendo de amor (Xavier Santos)
8. Amigo mío, cariño mío (Aníbal Pastor)
9. Sola con mi soledad (Aníbal Pastor)
10. ¿A cambio de qué? (Xavier Santos)
- Sin el (1984)
1. Ya no te vayas (Marco Antonio Solís)
2. Vete mejor (Marco Antonio Solís)
3. No puedo olvidarlo (Marco Antonio Solís)
4. La pareja ideal (Marco Antonio Solís)
5. El chico aquel (Marco Antonio Solís)
6. Sin él (Marco Antonio Solís)
7. Si no te hubieras ido (Marco Antonio Solís)
8. Prefiero ir sola (Marco Antonio Solís)
9. Dios bendiga nuestro amor (Marco Antonio Solís)
10. Vete con ella (Marco Antonio Solís)

=== Compilation albums ===
- Lo básico de Marisela (2010)
- Las Número 1 (CD+DVD)
- Tesoros de colección (2007)
- Ellas cantan así (2003)
- Serie 2000 (2000)
- Serie Platino (1996)
- 20 éxitos inmortales
- 30 grandes éxitos
- Personalidad
- La mejor intérprete de Marco Antonio Solís
- 15 Éxitos Vol. 1
- 15 Éxitos Vol. 2

== See also ==
- List of best-selling Latin music artists
- Women in Latin music
