= Barrio Boyzz =

Latin pop group

Background information
- Origin: New York City, United States
- Genres: Latin pop; R&B; pop; new jack swing; adult contemporary
- Years active: 1991–2001
- Labels: EMI Records; EMI Latin; SBK Records
- Past members: Freddy Correa; Angel Ramirez; David Davilla; Hans Giraldo; Luis A. Marrero; Robert Vargas

The Barrio Boyzz were an American Latin pop group. The group was made up of Puerto Ricans who grew up in New York City. They gained popularity during the 1990s, when they became label-mates with Selena then landed their first Billboard number-one song entitled "Donde Quiera Que Estés" (Where Ever You Are) in 1993, from the album of the same name.

== Career ==
The group was formed in 1991 when they were introduced to each other by manager Joe Jacket (of New Kids on The Block), who was looking to create a mainstream Latino group. After auditioning to Charles Koppelan, the CEO of EMI Records, they were then signed to SBK Records, a pop sub-division of EMI. They initially wanted to crossover as mainstream American pop singers, similar to Gloria Estefan, Jon Secada, and Selena. The following year, they released their debut album, Crazy Coolin', which they toured in middle and high schools across New York City, and made motivational speeches. Their single "Muy Suavemente", charted on the Billboard Latin Charts; its accompanying music video was shot in the barrios of New York City, sticking to their heritages. Their follow-up album Donde Quiera Que Estes (1993) peaked on Billboard Latin Pop Albums at number seven, whereas the album peaked at number fifteen on the Billboard Top Latin Albums. The duet, with Selena, peaked at number one on three Billboard charts in 1994 as Selena and the Barrio Boyzz promoted the song during her Amor Prohibido Tour. The song helped the Barrio Boyzz crossover to Southern United States. Their next album, "Una Vez Mas" peaked at number three on the Latin Pop Albums, while managing on the top twenty of the Billboard Top 50 Latin Albums. Their crossover album, "How We Roll", an all-English language album, was released in 1995. At the 8th and 9th Lo Nuestro Awards they received a nomination for Pop Group of the Year. The group continued to chart on Billboard until the release of Destiny in 2000. The group released their last studio album, "Destino" in 2001, before the band broke up. On 5 April 2005, during the benefit concert Selena ¡VIVE!, the Barrio Boyzz reunited and sang "Dreaming of You" along with Colombian-American singer Soraya, who died of breast cancer within a year.

== Members ==
- Freddy Correa (1991–1994)
- Angel Ramirez (1991–1997)
- Robert Vargas (1991–1997)
- David Davila (1991–2001)
- Hans Giraldo (1994–2001)
- Luis A. Marrero (1991–1998)
- Jimmy Sanchez (1999-2001)
- Robert McLeod (1999-2001)
- Jeffrey Ayala (1999-2001)

== Discography ==
"Dondequiera Que Estes" (1994)
The duet, with Selena, peaked at number-one on three Billboard charts in 1994, as Selena and the Barrio Boyzz promoted the song during her Amor Prohibido Tour. The song helped the Barrio Boyzz crossover to Southern United States

=== Studio albums ===
- Crazy Coolin' (1992)
- Donde Quiera Que Estes (1993)
- Una Vez Más (1995)
- How We Roll (1995)
- Navidad, Tu y Yo (1995)
- Ven a Mi (1997)
- Destiny (2000)
- Destino (2001)
- Barriografia (2006)

=== Compilation albums ===
- 10 Super Exitos (1994)
- 12 Super Exitos (1997)
- The Best of Barrio Boyzz (2000)
- Sólo Lo Mejor: 20 Exitos (2002)
- Latin Classics (2003)
- Los Romanticos (2007)

== Filmography ==
- I Like It Like That (1994)

== See also ==
- List of Puerto Ricans
