= Álvaro Torres =

Salvadoran singer-songwriter (born 1954)

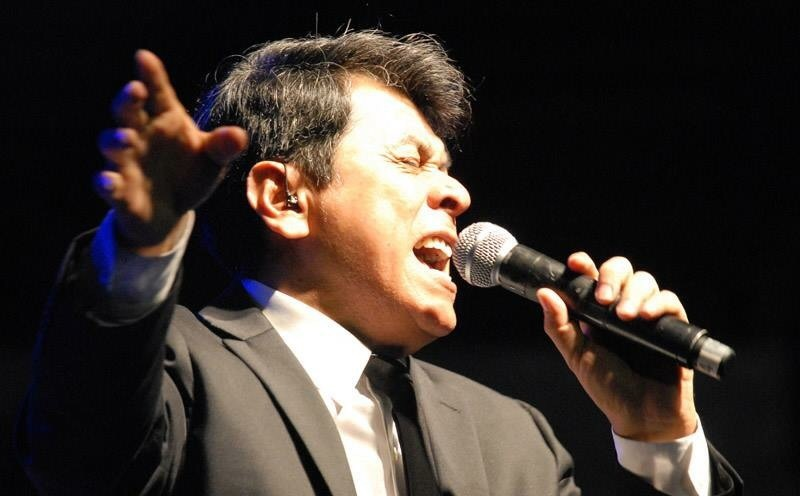
- Torres performing in Cuba, 2015

Background information
- Born: April 9, 1954 (age 72); Usulután, El Salvador
- Genre: Latin pop
- Occupation: Singer-songwriter
- Years active: 1973–present
- Website: alvarotorres.com

Álvaro Torres (born April 9, 1954) is a Salvadoran singer-songwriter.

== Biography ==
Álvaro Torres was born on April 9, 1954, in Concepción Batres, Usulatán, El Salvador. The first song he wrote was titled "Dulce amiga" at the age of 12, inspired by a childhood friend who was allowed to watch television at her house. From then on, the woman became his main source of inspiration. That same year, Pepe Rodas, director of the Radio Corporación, whom Torres met in one of the restaurants where he sang, invited him to the studios to record the demo that would change the course of his life. While in the studios, Rodas gave him an instrumental record by the Franck Pourcel Orchestra and a letter that he himself had composed for that melody. Torres moved to Guatemala and started a solo career recording his first album, Algo especial in 1976. In 1977, he released the album Acariciame and one year later, he was selected to represent El Salvador in the seventh edition of the OTI Festival with the song "Gracias". Although he got the second to last place, tied with the Colombian entrant Billy Pontoni, this was not an obstacle for his career. He became better known in the 1980s. Years later, Torres moved to the United States. He lived in Colorado, California and finally Florida. In 1991, Torres had an artistic breakthrough when he released the album Nada Se Compara Contigo. He was voted Songwriter of the Year by BMI in 1994.

Some of his more famous songs are "Hazme olvidarla", "La Unica" (The Only One), "Lo Que Se Dice Olvidar", "Si Estuvieras Conmigo" (If you were here with me), "Nada se compara contigo" (Nothing Compares to You), "A ti mi amor" (To you my love), "Te Olvidaré" (I'll Forget You), and "El último romántico" (The Last Romantic). He sang a duet with the Mexican singer Marisela on the song "Mi amor por ti" (My Love for You), and also sang a duet with Selena on the song "Buenos amigos" (Good Friends), and in 1997, he recorded "Estaremos Juntos" (We Will Be together), a duet with Puerto Rican singer Millie Corretjer for her album Sola (AlonSome of his musical influences are Sandro, Camilo Sesto, and Joan Manuel Serrat.

== Discography ==
- 1986: Tres (#47)
- 1988: Adicto (#40)
- 1988: Amor Que Mata (#19)
- 1988: Hazme Olvidarla (#7)
- 1989: Por lo Mucho Que Te Amo (#29)
- 1990: Ni Tú Ni Ella (#3)
- 1990: Si Estuvieras Conmigo (#9)
- 1991: Mi Verdadero Amor (#13)
- 1992: Nada Se Compara Contigo (#1)
- 1992: He Vivido Esperando Por Ti (#4)
- 1992: Cruz de Olvido (#31)
- 1993: Te Olvidaré (#11)
- 1993: Me Arrepiento de Quererte (#28)
- 1993: Te Dejo Libre (#4)
- 1993: Estoy Enamorado de Tí (#19)
- 1993: Que Lastimá (Nueva version) (#7)
- 1994: Angel Caido (#7)
- 1994: Tu Mejor Amigo (#11)
- 1994: Contigo Sí (#17)
- 1995: Reencuentro (con Barrio Boyzz) (#11)
- 1998: El Ultimo Romántico (#12)
