= Marco Antonio Solís discography =

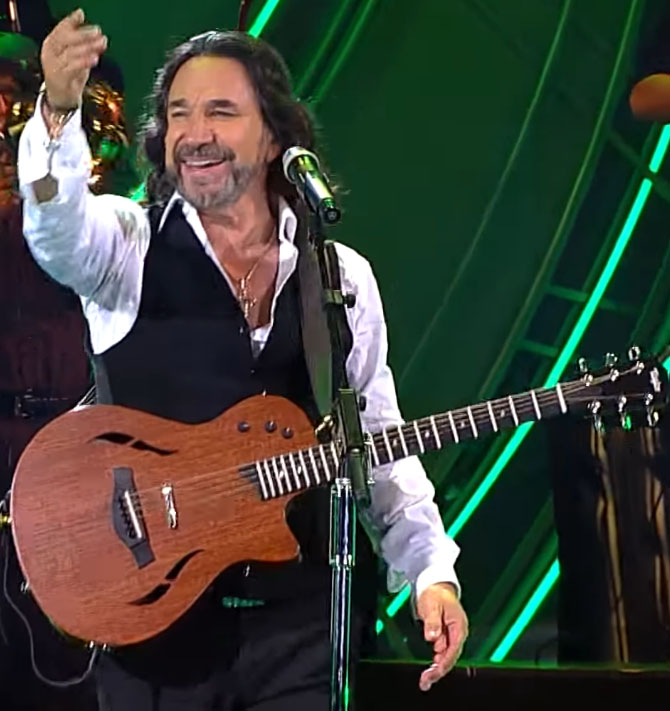
- Solís performing "O Me Voy o Te Vas" at the 2016 Viña del Mar International Song Festival
- Studio albums: 10
- Live albums: 5
- Compilation albums: 16
- Singles: 87

The discography of Mexican musician Marco Antonio Solís consists of 10 studio albums, five live albums, 16 compilation albums and 87 singles. Throughout Solís' career, he has achieved 11 number-one singles on the US Hot Latin Songs chart (one as a featured artist and one with Los Bukis) and is the artist with the most number-one albums on the US Billboard Top Latin Albums chart, with 12 number-ones overall; eight studio albums, two live albums and two compilation albums of his have reached the position.

After two decades of success for Mexican group Los Bukis, which Solís co-founded, he eventually left the group to pursue a solo career, where he released his first and second studio albums, En Pleno Vuelo and Marco, through Fonovisa Records. His third studio album Trozos de Mi Alma (1999) peaked atop the US Billboard Top Latin Albums chart, making it Solís' first album to do so. The album also peaked at number 157 on the Billboard 200 and was certified Platinum by the Recording Industry Association of America (RIAA) in 2000. That same year, he released his first live album En Vivo. He released his second live album En Vivo, Vol. 2 in 2001; the former became his second number-one album on the US Top Latin Albums chart, and his fourth studio album Más de Mi Alma that same year, which contained the hit single "O Me Voy o Te Vas"; it became his sixth number-one on the US Hot Latin Songs chart.

He attained more success with his fifth and sixth albums, Tu Amor o Tu Desprecio (2003) and Razón de Sobra (2004), which spawned other successful singles. In 2006, he released his seventh studio album Trozos de Mi Alma, Vol. 2, which is a sequel to his third album Trozos de Mi Alma (1999). He released his third live album Una Noche en Madrid in 2008, where it also reached chart positions in Mexico and Spain. The live album, which was recorded in Palacio Municipal de Congresos in Madrid, became Solís' eighth number-one album on the Top Latin Albums chart, tying with Luis Miguel on the record with the most number-ones on the chart. That same year, Solís achieved his highest-charting album on the Billboard 200 with No Molestar, peaking at number 19.

In 2010 and 2012, he would release his ninth studio album En Total Plenitud and his fourth live album Una Noche de Luna, which was recorded at Estadio Luna Park in Buenos Aires, respectively. Both albums also became tenth and eleventh number-one albums on the US Top Latin Albums chart, respectively. His tenth studio album Gracias Por Estar Aquí, which was released in 2013, reached higher positions on charts in the United States and Mexico. Following the release of Gracias Por Estar Aquí, it was certified Gold by Asociación Mexicana de Productores de Fonogramas y Videogramas (AMPROFON). In 2015, Solís released his fifth live album Por Amor a Morelia Michoacán which was recorded at Plaza Monumental de Morelia in Morelia. Compilation and greatest hits albums would follow the album.

== Albums ==
=== Studio albums ===
List of studio albums, with selected details, chart positions and certifications
Title	Details	Peak chart positions			Certifications
Title	Details	MEX	US	US Latin	Certifications
En Pleno Vuelo	Released: 24 July 1996; Label: Fonovisa; Formats: CD, digital download	—	— (Note: En Pleno Vuelo did not enter the Billboard 200 chart, but peaked at number 13 on the Heatseekers Albums chart.)	3	RIAA: Gold
Marco	Released: 30 September 1997; Label: Fonovisa; Formats: CD, digital download	—	— (Note: Marco did not enter the Billboard 200 chart, but peaked at number 16 on the Heatseekers Albums chart.)	3	RIAA: Gold
Trozos de Mi Alma	Released: 26 January 1999; Label: Fonovisa; Formats: CD, digital download	—	157	1	AMPROFON: Diamond; RIAA: Platinum
Más de Mi Alma	Released: 29 May 2001; Label: Fonovisa; Formats: CD, digital download	—	104	1	AMPROFON: 2× Platinum; RIAA: Gold
Tu Amor o Tu Desprecio	Released: 13 May 2003; Label: Fonovisa; Formats: CD, digital download	—	54	1	AMPROFON: Platinum; RIAA: 4× Platinum (Latin)
Razón de Sobra	Released: 2 November 2004; Label: Fonovisa; Formats: CD, digital download	—	58	1	AMPROFON: Platinum; RIAA: 2× Platinum (Latin)
Trozos de Mi Alma, Vol. 2	Released: 26 September 2006; Label: Fonovisa; Formats: CD, digital download	94	52	1	AMPROFON: Platinum; RIAA: 2× Platinum (Latin)
No Molestar	Released: 7 October 2008; Label: Fonovisa; Formats: CD, digital download	15	19	1	AMPROFON: Gold; RIAA: 2× Platinum (Latin)
En Total Plenitud	Released: 12 October 2010; Label: Fonovisa; Formats: CD, digital download	2	38	1	AMPROFON: Platinum; RIAA: Platinum (Latin)
Gracias Por Estar Aquí	Released: 22 October 2013; Label: Universal Music Latino, Habari Inc; Formats: CD, digital download	3	38	1	AMPROFON: Gold

=== Live albums ===
List of live albums, with selected details, chart positions and certifications
Title	Details	Peak chart positions				Certifications
Title	Details	MEX	SPA	US	US Latin	Certifications
En Vivo	Released: 30 October 2000; Label: Fonovisa; Formats: CD, digital download	—	—	— (Note: En Vivo did not enter the Billboard 200 chart, but peaked at number six on the Heatseekers Albums chart.)	6	
En Vivo, Vol. 2	Released: 8 October 2001; Label: Fonovisa; Formats: CD, digital download	—	—	—	27	
Una Noche en Madrid	Released: 10 June 2008; Label: Fonovisa; Formats: CD, digital download	6	97	41	1	AMPROFON: Platinum; RIAA: 2× Platinum (Latin)
Una Noche de Luna	Released: 26 June 2012; Label: Fonovisa; Formats: CD, digital download	19	—	120	1	AMPROFON: Platinum
Por Amor a Morelia Michoacán	Released: 23 October 2015; Label: Fonovisa; Formats: CD, digital download	4	—	—	4	

=== Compilation albums ===
List of compilation albums, with selected details, chart positions and certifications
Title	Details	Peak chart positions			Certifications
Title	Details	MEX	US	US Latin	Certifications
Los Grandes Éxitos de Marco Antonio Solís y Los Bukis: Recuerdos, Tristeza y Soledad	Released: 11 August 1998; Label: Fonovisa; Formats: CD, digital download	—	—	—	AMPROFON: Gold
Los Grandes (with Joan Sebastian)	Released: 2 April 2002; Label: Fonovisa; Formats: CD, digital download	—	—	14	
La Historia Continúa...	Released: 28 October 2003; Label: Fonovisa; Formats: CD, digital download	—	114	1	AMPROFON: Platinum; RIAA: 5× Platinum (Latin)
Dos Grandes (with Joan Sebastian)	Released: 29 June 2004; Label: Fonovisa; Formats: CD, digital download	—	125	2	AMPROFON: Gold
La Historia Continúa... Parte II	Released: 24 May 2005; Label: Fonovisa; Formats: CD, digital download	—	92	2	AMPROFON: Gold; RIAA: 4× Platinum (Latin)
Dos Idolos (with Pepe Aguilar)	Released: 27 September 2005; Label: Fonovisa; Formats: CD, digital download	—	198	8	
La Historia Continúa... Parte III	Released: 27 February 2007; Label: Fonovisa; Formats: CD, digital download	78	91	1	RIAA: Platinum (Latin)
La Mejor... Colección	Released: 11 December 2007; Label: Fonovisa; Formats: CD, digital download	79	92	2	
La Más Completa Colección	Released: 26 January 2009; Label: Fonovisa; Formats: CD, digital download	—	—	—	
Más de Marco Antonio Solís	Released: 3 November 2009; Label: Fonovisa; Formats: CD, digital download	—	174	3	
La Historia Continúa... Parte IV	Released: 24 January 2012; Label: Fonovisa; Formats: CD, digital download	—	—	6	
Antología	Released: 28 January 2014; Label: Fonovisa; Formats: CD, digital download	—	—	13	
15 Inolvidables	Released: 10 February 2015; Label: Fonovisa; Formats: CD, digital download	—	—	7	
15 Inolvidables Vol. 2	Released: 7 August 2015; Label: Fonovisa; Formats: CD, digital download	—	—	15	
40 Años	Released: 2 September 2016; Label: Fonovisa; Formats: CD, digital download	—	—	2	
Con Amor y Sentimiento	Released: 2020; Label: Fonovisa; Formats: CD, digital download	—	—	43	

== Singles ==
List of singles, with selected chart positions, certifications and album name
Title	Year	Peak chart positions					Certifications	Album
Title	Year	MEX	US	US Latin	US Latin Pop	US Reg. Mex	Certifications	Album
"Morenita"	1993	—	—	—	—	—		Inalcanzable
"Acepto Me Derrota"	1993	—	—	—	—	—		Inalcanzable
"Y Yo Sin Ti"	1994	—	—	—	—	—		Inalcanzable
"Tu Ingratitud"	1994	—	—	—	—	—		Inalcanzable
"Aquella	1994	—	—	—	—	—		Inalcanzable
"Encadenada a Mí"	1995	—	—	—	—	—		Inalcanzable
"Inaclanzable"	1995	—	—	—	—	—		Inalcanzable
"Popurrí"	1995	—	—	—	—	—		Non-album single
"Una Mujer Como Tu"	1995	—	—	1	—	—		Por Amor a Mi Pueblo
"Te Amo Mama"	1995	—	—	2	—	—		Por Amor a Mi Pueblo
"Será Mejor Que Te Vayas"	1995	—	—	3	—	—		Por Amor a Mi Pueblo
"Equivocado"	1995	—	—	8	—	—		Por Amor a Mi Pueblo
"Himno a la Humildad"	1995	—	—	6	—	—		Por Amor a Mi Pueblo
"Si Ya No Te Vuelvo A Ver"	1995	—	—	13	—	—		Por Amor a Mi Pueblo
"Por Amor a Mi Pueblo"	1996	—	—	5	—	—		Por Amor a Mi Pueblo
"Que Pena Me Das"	1996	—	—	1	—	—		En Pleno Vuelo
"Recuerdos, Tristeza, y Soledad"	1996	—	—	1	—	—		En Pleno Vuelo
"Así Como Te Conocí"	1997	—	—	1	—	—		En Pleno Vuelo
"O Soy, o Fui"	1997	—	—	3	—	—		En Pleno Vuelo
"El Ultimo Adios"	1997	—	—	—	—	—		En Pleno Vuelo
"Para Que Seas Feliz"	1997	—	—	—	—	—		En Pleno Vuelo
"Muevete"	1997	—	—	—	—	—		En Pleno Vuelo
"La Masoquista"	1997	—	—	—	—	—		En Pleno Vuelo
"La Venia Bendita"	1997	—	—	1	—	—		Marco
"Me Vas a Hacer Llorar"	1998	—	—	10	—	—		Marco
"Ya Aprenderas"	1998	—	—	34	—	—		Marco
"Casas de Cartón"	1998	—	—	—	—	—		Marco
"Serafin"	1999	—	—	—	—	—		Non-album single
"Si Te Pudiera Mentir"	1999	—	—	1	—	—		Trozos de Mi Alma
"El Peor de Mis Fracasos"	1999	—	—	5	—	—		Trozos de Mi Alma
"Si No Te Hubieras Ido"	1999	—	—	4	—	—		Trozos de Mi Alma
"Invéntame"	2000	—	—	36	—	—		Trozos de Mi Alma
"Mi Eterno Amor Secreto"	2000	—	—	—	—	—		Trozos de Mi Alma
"Amor En Silencio"	2000	—	—	—	—	—		Trozos de Mi Alma
"Se Va Muriendo Mi Alma"	2000	—	—	—	—	—		Trozos de Mi Alma
"Sigue Sin Mí"	2001	—	—	—	—	—		Trozos de Mi Alma
"En Mi Viejo San Juan"	2001	—	—	23	—	—		En Vivo
"O Me Voy o Te Vas"	2001	—	— (Note: "O Me Voy o Te Vas" did not enter the Billboard Hot 100, but peaked at number 16 on the Bubbling Under Hot 100 chart.)	1	3	4		Más de Mi Alma
"Sé Que Me Vas a Dejar"	2001	—	—	12	—	17		Más de Mi Alma
"Cuando Te Acuerdes de Mí"	2002	—	—	11	—	12		Más de Mi Alma
"Tu Hombre Perfecto"	2002	—	—	—	—	—		Más de Mi Alma
"Dónde Estará Mi Primavera"	2003	—	—	22	—	—		Más de Mi Alma
"Tu Amor o Tu Desprecio"	2003	—	— (Note: "No Molestar" did not enter the Billboard Hot 100, but peaked at number 21 on the Bubbling Under Hot 100 chart.)	1	—	—		Tu Amor o Tu Desprecio
"Más Que Tu Amigo"	2004	—	—	1	—	—		Tu Amor o Tu Desprecio
"Prefiero Partir"	2004	—	—	25	—	—		Tu Amor o Tu Desprecio
"Mi Mayor Sacrificio"	2004	—	—	8	—	—		Razón de Sobra
"Siempre Tú A Mi Lado"	2005	—	—	17	—	—		Razón de Sobra
"En el Mismo Tren"	2005	—	—	22	—	—		Razón de Sobra
"Sin Lado Izquierdo"	2005	—	—	—	—	—		Razón de Sobra
"Razón de Sobra"	2005	—	—	—	—	—		Razón de Sobra
"Cuatro Meses"	2005	—	—	—	—	—		Non-album single
"Antes de Que Te Vayas"	2006	—	— (Note: "Antes de Que Te Vayas" did not enter the Billboard Hot 100, but peaked at number 23 on the Bubbling Under Hot 100 chart.)	3	—	—		Trozos de Mi Alma, Vol. 2
"Ojalá"	2007	—	— (Note: "Ojalá" did not enter the Billboard Hot 100, but peaked at number 18 on the Bubbling Under Hot 100 chart.)	1	—	—		Trozos de Mi Alma, Vol. 2
"No Puedo Olvidarla"	2007	—	—	5	—	—		Trozos de Mi Alma, Vol. 2
"Te Voy A Esperar"	2008	—	—	48	—	—		Trozos de Mi Alma, Vol. 2
"No Molestar"	2008	27	— (Note: "No Molestar" did not enter the Billboard Hot 100, but peaked at number 20 on the Bubbling Under Hot 100 chart.)	3	—	—		No Molestar
"Nada Que Me Recuerde a Tí"	2009	31	—	29	—	—		No Molestar
"Si Me Puedo Quedar"	2009	—	—	—	—	—		No Molestar
"A Dónde Vamos a Parar"	2010	3	—	18	—	—		En Total Plenitud
"Tu Me Vuelves Loco"	2011	13	—	—	—	—		En Total Plenitud
"¡Basta Ya!" (with Jenni Rivera)	2011	3	—	14	—	—		Joyas Prestadas
"Como Tu Mujer" (with Jenni Rivera)	2012	—	—	28	—	—		Joyas Prestadas
"Y Ahora Te Vas (En Vivo)"	2012	—	—	—	—	—		Una Noche de Luna
"Tres Semanas"	2013	—	—	12	—	—		Gracias Por Estar Aqui
"El Perdedor" (Enrique Iglesias featuring Marco Antonio Solís)	2014	3	85	1	1	—	AMPROFON: 6× Diamond+Platinum	Sex and Love
"De Mil Amores"	2014	—	—	39	—	—		Gracias Por Estar Aqui
"Lo Mejor Para Los Dos"	2014	—	—	—	—	—		Gracias Por Estar Aqui
"Historia De Un Amor" (feat David Bisbal)	2014	—	—	—	—	—		Gracias Por Estar Aqui
"Tu Cárcel" (featuring Wisin Y Yandel, David Bisbal and Alejandra Guzman)	2014	—	—	—	—	—		Gracias Por Estar Aqui
"La Pirequa Michoacana	2015	—	—	—	—	—		Por Amor a Morelia Michoacán
"Navidad Sin Ti (En Vivo)"	2015	—	—	—	—	—		Por Amor a Morelia Michoacán
"Mi Mayor Necesidad / A Donde Vayas (En Vivo)"	2015	8	—	—	—	—		Por Amor a Morelia Michoacán
"A Donde Vamos A Parar (En Vivo)"	2015	—	—	—	—	—		Por Amor a Morelia Michoacán
"Preciento Que Voy A Llorar / Ladron De Buena Suerte (En Vivo)"	2015	—	—	—	—	—		Por Amor a Morelia Michoacán
"Necesito Una Companera (En Vivo)"	2015	—	—	—	—	—		Por Amor a Morelia Michoacán
"Inventme (En Vivo)"	2015	—	—	—	—	—		Por Amor a Morelia Michoacán
"La Vida Entera" (with Camila)	2015	—	—	—	—	—		Elypse
"Tu Carcel" (with Los Tigres del Norte)	2015	18	—	—	—	—		Desde El Azteca (En Vivo)
"Recuerdame (Ernesto De La Cruz)"	2018	—	—	—	—	—		Coco (Banda Sonora Original en Español)
"Recuerdos, Tristeza y Soledad (con Jesse & Joy)	2018	—	—	—	—	—		Todos Somos Mas
"Estare Contigo"	2018	—	—	—	—	—		Mas De Mis Recuerdos
"La Del Perro"	2018	—	—	—	—	—		Mas De Mis Recuerdos
"Eran Mentiras"	2018	—	—	—	—	—		Mas De Mis Recuerdos
"Yo Te Necesito"	2019	38	—	—	—	—		Mas De Mis Recuerdos
"Con Esa Duda"	2019	—	—	—	—	—		Mas De Mis Recuerdos
"El Buen Mensajero"	2019	—	—	—	—	—		Non-album single
"Olvidame Tu" (con Miguel Bosé)	2019	—	—	—	—	—		MTV Unplugged
