= Una Noche en Madrid =

Live album by Marco Antonio Solís
- Released: June 10, 2008
- Recorded: October 12, 2007
- Genre: Norteño, mariachi, cumbia, Pop Latino
- Length: 62:52
- Label: Fonovisa
- Producer: Marco Antonio Solís

Marco Antonio Solís chronology
La Mejor... Colección (2007)	Una Noche en Madrid (2008)	La Más Completa Colección (2009)

Professional ratings
Review scores
Source	Rating
Allmusic	4/5 stars

Una Noche en Madrid (Eng.: A Night in Madrid) is a live album released by Marco Antonio Solís on June 10, 2008. This album was recorded at the Palacio Municipal de Congresos in Madrid Spain, on October 12, 2007 and became the eight number-one set on the Billboard Top Latin Albums for Solís, tying the record for most number-one albums on the chart with Luis Miguel.

== Track listing ==
All songs written and composed by Marco Antonio Solís

No.	Title	Length
1.	"Amor en Silencio"	07:03
2.	"Morenita"	04:01
3.	"O Me Voy o Te Vas"	06:14
4.	"Si Te Pudiera Mentir"	04:26
5.	"Tu Carcel"	05:52
6.	"Ojalá"	04:18
7.	"Como Tu Mujer (duet with Pasión Vega)"	05:04
8.	"Antes de Que Te Vayas"	04:26
9.	"Donde Estará Mi Primavera"	04:44
10.	"Más Que Tu Amigo"	04:32
11.	"Si No Te Hubieras Ido"	09:10
12.	"La Venia Bendita"	04:34

== DVD ==
No.	Title	Length
1.	"Amor en Silencio"	6:48
2.	"Morenita"	4:12
3.	"O Me Voy o Te Vas"	5:50
4.	"Si Te Pudiera Mentir"	4:27
5.	"Tu Carcel"	5:55
6.	"Ojalá"	3:47
7.	"Como Tu Mujer (duet With Pasión Vega)"	5:36
8.	"Antes de Que Te Vayas"	4:14
9.	"Donde Estará Mi Primavera"	4:43
10.	"Más Que Tu Amigo"	4:24
11.	"Si No Te Hubieras Ido"	9:43
12.	"La Venia Bendita"	5:40

- DVD also contains photo gallery.

== Personnel ==
The information from Allmusic.

- Marco Antonio Solís — Producer
- Mayte Aragon — Producer, video producer
- Carlos Garcia — Producer, video producer
- Chris Bellman — Mastering
- Benny Faccone — Recording, mixing
- Tom Syrowski — Mixing assistant
- Victor Aguilar — Percussion, segundo
- Fidel Arreygue — Bass
- Fernando Cruz — Trombone, metal section
- Emilio García — Drums
- Antonio González — Trumpet
- Luis León — Trombone, metal section
- Rodolfo Luviano — Keyboards, direction
- Martin Serrano — Guitar, keyboards
- Arturo Solar — Choir director
- Estanis Núñez — Photography
- Adriana Rebold — Graphic design

== Charts ==
Chart (2008)	Peak position
Mexican Albums (AMPROFON)	6
Spanish Albums (PROMUSICAE)	97
US Billboard 200	41
US Regional Mexican Albums (Billboard)	1
US Top Latin Albums (Billboard)	1

== Sales and certifications ==
Region	Certification	Certified units/sales
Argentina (CAPIF)	Gold	20,000^{^}
Mexico (AMPROFON)	Platinum	80,000^{^}
United States (RIAA)	2× Platinum (Latin)	200,000^{^}
^{^} Shipments figures based on certification alone.
