= List of best-selling albums in Mexico =

Mexico ranks as the tenth largest music market in the world and the largest Spanish-language market, according to the IFPI 2024 report. Although long plagued by piracy, the domestic market has strengthened in recent years due to strong growth from digital and streaming services, which account for 66% of the overall value, according to the IFPI.

Two lists are shown that collect the best-selling albums released in the country; the first is based on figures from the database of the Asociación Mexicana de Productores de Fonogramas y Videogramas (AMPROFON) uploaded since 1999. The second shows the best-selling albums by claimed sales.

== Best-selling albums by AMPROFON (1999 to present) ==
- (Top albums based on certifications awarded since January 1, 1999).

No.	Year	Album	Artist	Sales	Certification
1	1982	Thriller	Michael Jackson	2,600,000	2× Diamond+2× Platinum+Gold
2	2021	KG0516	Karol G	2,240,000	3× Diamond+Platinum
3	1992	¿Dónde Jugarán los Niños?	Maná	2,000,000	2× Diamond
4	1997	Histórico: Banda El Recodo En Vivo	Banda El Recodo	1,450,000	3× Platinum+7× Gold
4	2005	La Voz de un Ángel	Yuridia	1,450,000	2× Diamond + 4× Platinum + Gold
5	1998	Dónde Están los Ladrones?	Shakira	1,350,000	Diamond+ Platinum + Gold
6	2008	Viva la Vida or Death and All His Friends	Coldplay	1,280,000	Platinum and 2× Diamond+4× Platinum (Pre-loaded album)
7	1997	Sueños Líquidos	Maná	1,200,000	Diamond+2× Gold
8	2005	Intensive Care	Robbie Williams	1,150,000	Platinum+Gold and 2× Diamond (Pre-loaded album)
9	1998	Tengo Una Ilusión	Banda El Recodo	1,000,000	2× Platinum+5× Gold
9	1999	Trozos de Mi Alma	Marco Antonio Solís	1,000,000	Diamond
9	1990	En Vivo	Ana Gabriel	1,000,000	Diamond
9	1995	Pies Descalzos	Shakira	1,000,000	Diamond
10	2006	MTV Unplugged	Ricky Martin	950,000	2× Platinum and Diamond+2× Platinum+Gold (Pre-loaded album)
11	1999	MTV Unplugged	Maná	900,000	6× Platinum
12	1991	Mi México	Ana Gabriel	850,000	3× Platinum+Gold
13	2019	When We All Fall Asleep, Where Do We Go?	Billie Eilish	840,000	2× Diamond+4× Platinum
13	2022	Un Verano Sin Ti	Bad Bunny	840,000	Diamond+Platinum
14	2004	México en la Piel	Luis Miguel	800,000	3× Platinum+Diamond
15	1997	Más	Alejandro Sanz	750,000	3× Platinum
15	1999	Amarte Es un Placer	Luis Miguel	750,000 (Note: The album sold 800,000 copies as of 2015.)	5× Platinum
15	1993	Mi tierra	Gloria Estefan	750,000 (Note: Actual sales of the album stand at between 800,000 and 1 million according to Billboard and The Guardian, respectively.)	3× Platinum
16	2015	Los Dúo	Juan Gabriel	720,000	2× Diamond+2× Platinum
16	2019	Ocean	Karol G	720,000	2× Diamond+2× Platinum
17	1998	Cómo te recuerdo	Los Temerarios	700,000	2× Platinum+2× Gold
17	1995	Cuando los Ángeles Lloran	Maná	700,000	2× Platinum+2× Gold
18	2011	MTV Unplugged/Música de fondo	Zoe	690,000	2× Diamond+Platinum+Gold
18	2017	Don't Smile at Me	Billie Eilish	690,000	2× Diamond+Platinum+Gold
19	1999	Millennium	Backstreet Boys	675,000	4× Platinum+Gold
20	2009	Primera Fila	Thalía	660,000	2× Diamond+Platinum
21	2005	Fijacion Oral Vol. 1	Shakira	650,000	Diamond+Platinum+Gold
22	2021	Sour	Olivia Rodrigo	630,000	4× Platinum+Gold
23	2000	Paulina	Paulina Rubio	600,000	4× Platinum
23	2000	CD 00	OV7	600,000	4× Platinum
23	2001	Mis Romances	Luis Miguel	600,000	4× Platinum
23	1991	Dangerous	Michael Jackson	600,000	2× Platinum+Gold
23	1992	A Ti Madrecita	Los Tigres del Norte	600,000	2× Platinum+Gold
23	1999	Contigo	Intocable	600,000	4× Platinum
23	1988	Tierra de Nadie	Ana Gabriel	600,000	2× Platinum+Gold
24	1999	Laundry Service	Shakira	575,000	Diamond+Gold
25	2004	Rebelde	RBD	550,000	Diamond+Gold
25	2007	Para Siempre	Vicente Fernández	550,000	Diamond+Gold
26	2020	Sie7e +	Danna Paola	540,000	Diamond+4× Platinum
26	2012	Cómo te voy a olvidar	Los Ángeles Azules	540,000	4× Platinum+Diamond
27	2000	Vivo	Luis Miguel	525,000	3× Platinum+Gold
27	2002	Revolución de Amor	Maná	525,000	3× Platinum+Gold
28	1988	Chayanne	Chayanne	500,000	2× Platinum
28	1998	Atado a Tu Amor	Chayanne	500,000	2× Platinum
28	1998	Celebrando 25 Años de Juan Gabriel: En Concierto en el Palacio de Bellas Artes	Juan Gabriel	500,000	2× Platinum
28	1995	Jagged Little Pill	Alanis Morissette	500,000	2× Platinum

== By claimed sales ==
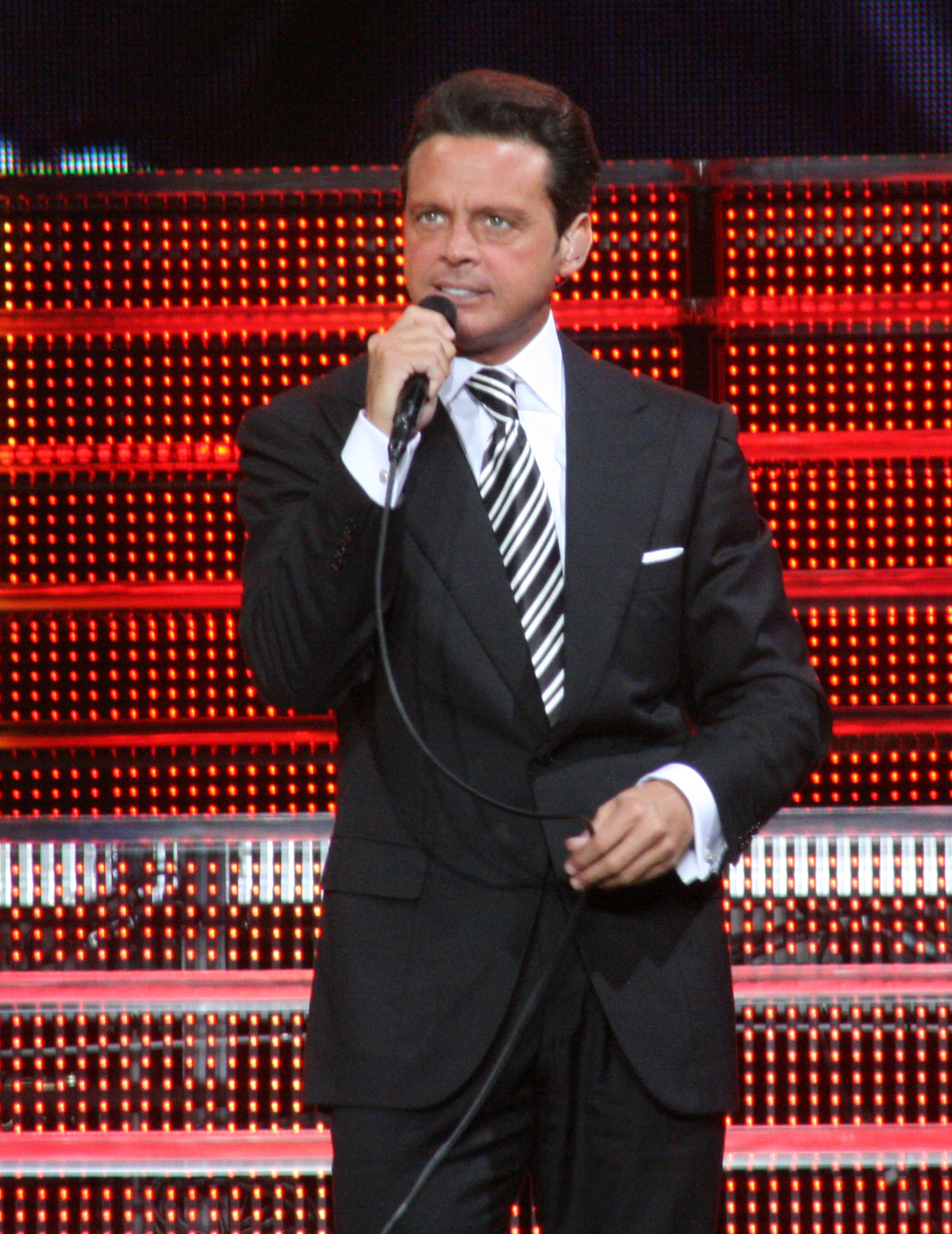
Luis Miguel (pictured) has numerous album with claimed sales of over one million, before AMPROFON started their certifying program in 1999

The following is a list of albums that came out before the advent of AMPROFON online certifications program started in 1999 and which recorded higher sales of over 800,000 copies. Some media reported the certifications and sales by AMPROFON before that, for example, the 1994 annual year-end inform published by Notimex and reprinted by La Opinión. Additions are cross-referenced with national publications and other media international outlets.

=== List ===
*Positions based on claimed sales and release year.

The best-selling album in Mexico vary by some report estimations but lacks of reliability. This include Las Mañanitas by Pedro Infante, which Mexico City-based newspaper El Universal reported sales of 20 million copies, Juan Gabriel's Recuerdos II with 8 million claimed sales, or Emmanuel's Íntimamente and José José' Secretos with claimed sales of 5 million each. Luis Miguel has numerous entries.

Albums with highest claimed copies
Year	Artist	Album	Sales	Ref.
1991	Luis Miguel	Romance	3,000,000	
1980	Emmanuel	Íntimamente	2,500,000	
1994	Luis Miguel	Segundo Romance	2,000,000	
1983	José José	Secretos	2,000,000	
1997	Luis Miguel	Romances	1,675,000	
1988	Luis Miguel	Busca una Mujer	1,400,000	
1984	José José	Reflexiones	1,300,000	
1950	Pedro Infante	Las Mañanitas	1,000,000	
1982	Luis Miguel	Un sol	1,000,000	
1982	Emmanuel	Tú y Yo	1,000,000	
1986	Los Bukis	Me Volvi a Acordar de Ti	1,000,000	
1987	Timbiriche	Timbiriche VII	1,000,000	
1987	Luis Miguel	Soy Como Quiero Ser	1,000,000	
1989	Daniela Romo	Quiero Amanecer con Alguien	1,000,000	
1989	Los Bukis	Y Para Siempre	1,000,000	
1990	Juan Luis Guerra	Bachata Rosa	1,000,000	
1990	Luis Miguel	20 Años	1,000,000	
1991	Los Temerarios	Seducción Romántica de los 90's	1,000,000	
1991	Bronco	Salvaje y Tierno	1,000,000	
1993	Luis Miguel	Aries	1,000,000	
1993	Los Bukis	Inalcanzable	1,000,000	
1994	Mónica Naranjo	Mónica Naranjo	1,000,000	
1997	Enrique Iglesias	Vivir	1,000,000	
1982	Luis Miguel	Directo al corazón	900,000	
1996	Grupo Límite	Partiéndome El Alma	890,000	
1977	Bee Gees	Saturday Night Fever	800,000	
1990	Madonna	The Immaculate Collection	800,000	
1992	Gloria Trevi	Me Siento Tan Sola	800,000	
1995	Shakira	Pies Descalzos	800,000	

== Best-selling albums by year ==
Year	Album	Artist	Sales	Ref.
1992	Romance	Luis Miguel	1,623,000	
1994	Segundo Romance	Luis Miguel	2,000,000	
1997	Romances	Luis Miguel	1,100,000	
2004	México en la Piel	Luis Miguel	500,000	

== See also ==
- List of best-selling singles in Mexico
- AMPROFON
- Top 100 Mexico
- List of best-selling albums by country
