= Billboard Regional Mexican Albums Year-end Chart, 1980s =

The Year-End charts for the Regional Mexican Albums chart in the 1980s are published in the last issue of Billboard magazine every year. The chart was based on information provided by Nielsen Broadcast Data Systems, which collected a survey from music retail shops and one-stop sales in the United States until May 1991 when the methodology was changed to include point-of-sale data compiled from Nielsen SoundScan. The Year-End charts represent aggregated numbers from the weekly charts that were compiled for each artist, album and record company.

== Regional Mexican Albums of the Year ==
‡ – represents the best-performing single of the year.

Year	Rank	Single	Performer
1987	1	Me Volvi a Acordar de Ti ‡	Los Bukis
1987	2	Gracias America	Los Tigres Del Norte
1987	3	Timeless	Little Joe y la Familia
1987	4	Hoy Platique Con Mi Gallo	Vicente Fernandez
1987	5	Corazon Vacio	Los Yonics
1987	6	La Tambora	Antonio Aguilar
1987	7	De Guanajuato Para America	Los Caminantes
1987	8	Capullo y Sorullo	Sonora Dinamita
1987	9	Realidades	Los Bondadosos
1987	10	16 Superexitos	Los Bukis
1988	1	Si Me Recuerdas ‡	Los Bukis
1988	2	Petalos y Espinas	Los Yonics
1988	3	Me Volvi a Acordar de Ti	Los Bukis
1988	4	Canciones de Mi Padre	Linda Ronstadt
1988	5	Superbronco	Bronco
1988	6	Idolos Del Pueblo	Los Tigres Del Norte
1988	7	Dos Corazones	Vicente Fernandez and Vikki Carr
1988	8	La Gallina	Fito Olivares
1988	9	El Cuatrero	Vicente Fernandez
1988	10	No Me Olvidaras	Jose Javier Solis
1989	1	Un Golpe Mas ‡	Bronco
1989	2	Siempre Te Amare	Los Yonics
1989	3	Los Corridos Prohibidos	Los Tigres Del Norte
1989	4	Incontenibles Románticos	Los Caminantes
1989	5	Mascarada	Joan Sebastian
1989	6	Explosivo	La Mafia
1989	7	Straight From the Heart	Mazz
1989	8	Por Tu Maldito Amor	Vicente Fernandez
1989	9	Aunque Pasen Los Anos	Little Joe y la Familia
1989	10	Canciones de Mi Padre	Linda Ronstadt

1987, 1988, 1989,
