= List of Billboard Regional Mexican Albums number ones from the 1980s =

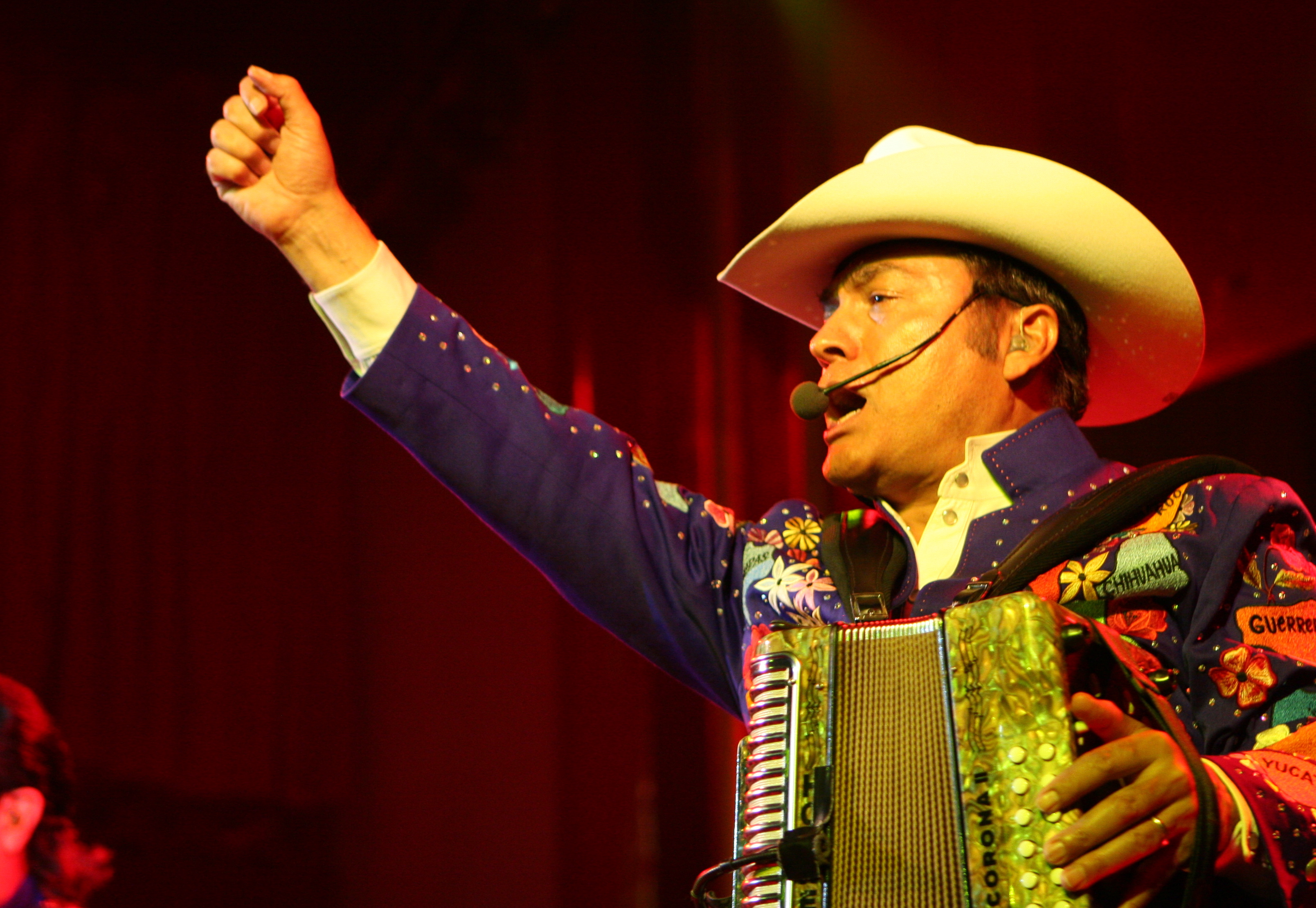
Mexican norteño-group Los Tigres del Norte were the first Regional Mexican artists to reach number-one with their album, Jaula de Oro.

The Billboard Regional Mexican Albums chart, published in Billboard magazine, is a record chart that features Latin music sales information. This data are compiled by Nielsen SoundScan from a sample that includes music stores, music departments at electronics and department stores, Internet sales (both physical and digital) and verifiable sales from concert venues in the United States. The data for this chart was published every two weeks, unlike most Billboard charts.

The Regional Mexican Albums chart was first of the three Latin-related albums (along with Latin Pop Albums and Tropical Albums) published on June 29, 1985, eight years before the Top Latin Album survey which began on July 10, 1993. Billboard published a biweekly chart throughout the 1980s.

Los Tigres del Norte were the first artists to reach number-one with their album, Jaula de Oro'. Three other albums by the group: El Otro Mexico, Los Idolos del Pueblo, and Los Corridos Prohibidos reached number-one on the Regional Mexican charts. Each album by the group received a Grammy Award-nomination for Best Mexican-American Performance.

Los Bukis, led by Marco Antonio Solís, were the second artists to reach number-one with their album, A Donde Vas.

Joan Sebastian was the first solo performer of Regional Mexican music to reach number-one with his album Rumores. Another album by Joan Sebastian, Con Tambora was the longest number-one Regional Mexican album which spent 23 consecutive weeks.

Los Bondadosos reach number-one in the chart for the first time with their album, Porque me haces sufrir. In addition, a compilation album related to group reached number-one on the chart.

Two albums by Los Yonic's reached number-one on the chart: Petalo y Espinas and Siempre Te Amaré. The former received a Grammy Award-nomination for Best Mexican-American Performance.

Near the end of the decade, Vicente Fernández's album, Por Tu Maldito spent 11 consecutive weeks number-one on the chart.

== Number-one albums ==
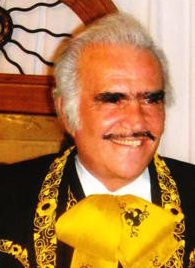
Por Tu Maldito Amor by Vicente Fernández spent 11 consecutive weeks number-one by the end of the decade.

Album	Artist	Date	Weeks
Jaula de Oro	Los Tigres del Norte	June 29, 1985	1
A Donde Vas	Los Bukis	July 13, 1985	8
Por que me haces sufrir	Los Bondadosos	November 2, 1985	1
A Donde Vas	Los Bukis	November 16, 1985	8
Rumores	Joan Sebastian	January 11, 1986	1
A Donde Vas	Los Bukis	January 25, 1986	5
El Otro Mexico	Los Tigres del Norte	April 5, 1986	2
A Donde Vas	Los Bukis	May 3, 1986	3
17 Super Exitos	Los Bondadosos	June 14, 1986	1
La Mafia 1986	La Mafia	June 28, 1986	1
17 Super Exitos	Los Bondadosos	July 17, 1986	1
De Guanajuato...Para America!	Los Caminantes	August 9, 1986	4
Los Yonics	Los Yonics	October 4, 1986	3
Con Banda	Antonio Aguilar	November 15, 1986	3
De Guanajuato...Para America!	Los Caminantes	December 27, 1986	1
Con Tambora	Joan Sebastian	January 10, 1987	7
Gracias!... América... Sin Fronteras	Los Tigres del Norte	April 18, 1987	1
Con Tambora	Joan Sebastian	April 25, 1987	16
Petalos y Espinas	Los Yonic's	December 12, 1987	8
Idolos del Pueblo	Los Tigres del Norte	June 18, 1988	2
Mascarada	Joan Sebastian	July 16, 1988	3
Idolos del Pueblo	Los Tigres del Norte	August 27, 1988	1
Mascarada	Joan Sebastian	September 10, 1988	7
Siempre Te Amare	Los Yonic's	December 17, 1988	3
Un Golpe Más	Bronco	January 28, 1989	6
Siempre Te Amaré	Los Yonic's	April 22, 1989	2
Los Corridos Prohibidos	Los Tigres del Norte	May 20, 1989	6
Por Tu Maldito Amor	Vicente Fernández	August 12, 1989	11
