= Falso Amor =

Studio album by Los Bukis
- Released: October 10, 1975
- Recorded: 1974
- Genre: Grupero
- Length: 33:34
- Label: Discos Melody

Los Bukis chronology
Falso Amor (1975)	Te Tuve Y Te Perdi (1977)

Falso Amor (also known as Casas de Carton) is the debut studio album released by Los Bukis in 1975. After signing with Discos Melody in Mexico. Note: "Casas de Carton" was taken out of later publications of this album due to its controversial nature, being replaced by a cover of King Clave song "Los Hombres No Deben Llorar" as the first song.

== Track listing ==
All songs written and composed by Marco Antonio Solís, except where otherwise noted.

No.	Title	Length
1.	"Casas de Carton" (Ali Primera)	3:54
2.	"Quieres Ser Mi Amante" (Camilo Blanes)	3:49
3.	"Cuando Tu Cariño" (Urbano Medinabeytia)	2:37
4.	"Falso Amor" (Marco Antonio Solís)	2:57
5.	"Te Necesito Tanto Amor" (Elio Roca)	2:57
6.	"Sentimientos" (Loulou Gasté, Morris Albert)	4:38
7.	"Mar de Soledad"	3:27
8.	"Mi Plegaria" (Martin Perez Aguilera)	3:00
9.	"Necesito Rosas" (Marco Antonio Solís)	2:38
10.	"Te Juro Que Te Amo" (Bruno Lauzi, Elbert Moguel)	3:44
