= Mas De Mis Recuerdos =

Studio album by Marco Antonio Solís
- Released: November 30, 2018
- Recorded: 2018
- Genre: Latin pop
- Label: Marbella Music
- Producer: Marco Antonio Solís

Marco Antonio Solís chronology
Gracias Por Estar Aquí (2013)	Mas De Mis Recuerdos (2018)	TBA

Singles from Mas De Mis Recuerdos
- 1. "Eran Mentiras" Released: August 16, 2016; 2. "Estaré Contigo" Released: November 12, 2015

Mas De Mis Recuerdos is the eleventh studio album by Marco Antonio Solís, released on November 30, 2018. The album was released on CD format on low quantity and the decision was made to release the album on digital form. Eran Mentiras was released as the lead single for the album. Marco also re-recorded five songs he composed as the lead singer of Los Bukis he then embarked on tour called Y La Historia Continua. Estaré Contigo was the opening theme for the telenovela En tierras salvajes.

== Track listing ==
All tracks are written by Marco Antonio Solís.

No.	Title	Length
1.	"Estaré Contigo"	3:52
2.	"Como Dejar De Amarte"	3:21
3.	"Deja Interrumpir Tu Vida"	4:10
4.	"No Me Arrepiento"	5:00
5.	"La Del Perro"	3:00
6.	"Yo Te Necesito"	3:32
7.	"Eran Mentiras"	4:00
8.	"Mi Deseo"	4:11
9.	"Con Esa Duda"	2:42
10.	"Me Volvi a Acordar de Ti"	3:43
