= Inalcanzable =

Inalcanzable may refer to:

- "Inalcanzable" (song), a 2007 song by RBD
- Inalcanzable (album), a 1993 album by Los Bukis
