= Me Siento Solo =

Studio album by Los Bukis
- Released: June 29, 1978
- Recorded: March 1978
- Studios: Discos Melody, Mexico City
- Genre: Grupero
- Length: 29:50
- Label: Discos Melody

Los Bukis chronology
Te Tuve Y Te Perdi (1977)	Me Siento Solo (1978)	Los Triunfadores (1979)

Me Siento Solo (Eng.: "I Feel Lonely") is the third studio album released by Los Bukis in 1978.

== Track listing ==
All songs were written and composed by Marco Antonio Solís, except for La Indiecita.

No.	Title	Length
1.	"Me Siento Solo"	3:07
2.	"La Indiecita" (written by Manuel "Garcia" Barca)	3:17
3.	"Capricho"	3:13
4.	"Los Alambrados"	3:15
5.	"Mi Linda Esposa"	2:22
6.	"Ilusión Pasajera"	3:04
7.	"Poquito a Poco"	2:25
8.	"Te Vas"	3:32
9.	"Una Vida de Amor"	2:30
10.	"Quise Olvidarme de Ti"	3:02
