= Quiéreme =

Studio album by Los Bukis
- Released: March 10, 1992
- Recorded: 1991–1992
- Genre: Grupero
- Length: 37:16
- Label: Fonovisa

Los Bukis chronology
A Través de Tus Ojos (1991)	Quiéreme (1992)	Inalcanzable (1993)

Singles from Quiéreme
- 1. "Quiéreme" Released: January 13, 1992; 2. "Mi Mayor Necesidad" Released: May 18, 1992; 3. "El Celoso" Released: July 27, 1992; 4. "Viéndolo Bien" Released: September 28, 1992; 5. "Qué Duro Es Llorar Así" Released: December 14, 1992

Quiéreme (Eng.: "Love Me") is the fourteenth studio album released by Los Bukis on March 10, 1992. The album was certified gold in the United States by the RIAA.

== Track listing ==
All songs written and composed by Marco Antonio Solís except for Viéndolo Bien

No.	Title	Length
1.	"Quiéreme"	4:13
2.	"Viéndolo Bien" (written by Manolo Marroquin)	2:58
3.	"El Celoso"	3:31
4.	"Que le Vaya Bien"	3:51
5.	"Buena Leccion"	4:28
6.	"Mi Mayor Necesidad"	4:12
7.	"Por Que Siempre Te Amare"	3:16
8.	"Dime Donde y Cuando"	4:01
9.	"Que Duro Es Llorar Asi"	3:45
10.	"Volveré"	3:33

== Charts ==
Chart (1992–1993)	Peak position
US Top Latin Albums (Billboard)	23
US Regional Mexican Albums (Billboard)	10
US Latin Pop Albums (Billboard)	5

== Sales and certifications ==
Region	Certification	Certified units/sales
United States (RIAA)	Gold	500,000^{^}
^{^} Shipments figures based on certification alone.
