= Yo Te Necesito =

Studio album by Los Bukis
- Released: May 25, 1982
- Recorded: February – May 1982
- Studios: Hollywood Sound Recorders, 6650 W Sunset Boulevard
- Genre: Grupero
- Length: 32:32
- Label: Melody

Los Bukis chronology
| Presiento Que Voy a Llorar (1981) | Yo Te Necesito (1982) | Mi Fantasia (1983) |

Yo Te Necesito (English: I Need You) is the seventh studio album recorded by Mexican band Los Bukis. It was released by Melody in 1982 (see 1982 in music). Las Musiqueras was also the name of the movie starring Los Bukis. The album was nominated for a Grammy Award for Best Mexican-American Performance.

== Track listing ==
All songs written and composed by Marco Antonio Solís, except where otherwise noted.

| No. | Title | Length |
|---|---|---|
| 1. | "Qué Lastima" | 3:43 |
| 2. | "Las Musiqueras" (written by Federico Curiel) | 3:18 |
| 3. | "Mi Gran Verdad" | 3:11 |
| 4. | "Qué Pensabas" | 3:24 |
| 5. | "Mi Castigo de Quererte" | 3:05 |
| 6. | "Yo Te Necesito" | 3:00 |
| 7. | "A Mi Ley" (written by Eusebio Cortez) | 2:35 |
| 8. | "Te Esperaré" | 3:41 |
| 9. | "No le Hago Al Barro" | 3:15 |
| 10. | "Una Vez Mas" | 3:07 |
