= Los Triunfadores =

Studio album by Los Bukis
- Released: March 23, 1979
- Recorded: January 1979
- Studios: Marco Musical Estudios, Ixtapaluca, México
- Genre: Grupero
- Length: 29:29
- Label: Discos Melody

Los Bukis chronology
Me Siento Solo (1978)	Los Triunfadores (1979)	Me Muero Porque Seas Mi Novia (1980)

Los Triunfadores (The Winners) is the fourth studio album released by Los Bukis in 1979.

== Track listing ==
All songs written and composed by Marco Antonio Solís except for "Las Holgazanas".

No.	Title	Length
1.	"Triste Imaginar"	3:07
2.	"Eres"	3:02
3.	"Linda Realidad"	2:54
4.	"Te Quiero a Ti"	3:07
5.	"Las Holgazanas" (written by Ramiro Aguilar)	3:05
6.	"Cuando Me Viste Con Otra"	3:07
7.	"Si Te Pasa lo Que Me Paso"	2:29
8.	"Pienso"	3:04
9.	"No Creo Mas en Ti"	3:10
10.	"No Volvernos a Ver"	2:59
