= Me Muero Porque Seas Mi Novia =

Studio album by Los Bukis
- Released: June 5, 1980
- Recorded: January – June 1980
- Studios: Fonovisa Studios, Los Angeles, CA (Recording) Fonovisa, Mexico City (Mastering) North Hollywood, CA (Overdubs)
- Genre: Grupero
- Length: 30:54
- Label: Fonovisa

Los Bukis chronology
Los Triunfadores (1979)	Me Muero Porque Seas Mi Novia (1980)	Presiento Que Voy a Llorar (1981)

Me Muero Porque Seas Mi Novia (I'd Die for You to Be My Girlfriend) is the fifth studio album released by Los Bukis in 1980. It was later re-released as Mi Najayita. The group moved to the United States and signed with Fonovisa.

== Track listing ==
All songs written and composed by Marco Antonio Solís except for Los Chicanos

No.	Title	Length
1.	"Me Muero Porque Seas Mi Novia"	3:01
2.	"Mi Najayita"	3:03
3.	"Sabes"	2:51
4.	"Si Tu Quisieras"	3:04
5.	"Los Chicanos" (written by Eusebio Cortez)	2:19
6.	"En un Rato Más"	2:35
7.	"Al Fin"	3:29
8.	"Ayer a Estas Horas"	3:22
9.	"Estabas Tan Linda"	3:47
10.	"Desde Entonces"	3:01
