= Mi Fantasia =

Studio album by Los Bukis
- Released: September 9, 1983
- Recorded: July 1983
- Genre: Grupero
- Length: 39:13
- Label: Fonovisa

Los Bukis chronology
Yo Te Necesito (1982)	Mi Fantasia (1983)	A Donde Vas (1985)

Mi Fantasia (Eng.: My Fantasy) is the eighth studio album released by Los Bukis in September of 1983.

== Track listing ==
All songs written and composed by Marco Antonio Solís except for "Si No Es Contigo". The song "Hasta Siempre" is a medley with songs from previous albums with spoken word passages, and is not included in digital reissues on streaming platforms.

No.	Title	Length
1.	"Mi Fantasia"	3:26
2.	"Necesita de Ti"	3:35
3.	"Llega Que Llega"	2:55
4.	"Ya No Te Vayas"	4:07
5.	"Hasta Siempre"	5:11
6.	"Tienes Razón"	2:46
7.	"Necesito Una Compañera"	3:54
8.	"Viva el Amor"	3:46
9.	"Si No Es Contigo" (written by Eusebio Cortez)	2:54
10.	"Volvamos a Intentar"	2:58
11.	"Ella No Sabia"	3:18
