= Te Tuve y Te Perdí =

Studio album by Los Bukis
- Released: April 12, 1977
- Recorded: December 1976 - March 1977
- Studios: Lomas De Chapultepec, Mexico City
- Genre: Grupero
- Length: 26:35
- Label: Discos Melody

Los Bukis chronology
Falso Amor (Casas de Carton) (1975)	Te Tuve y Te Perdí (1977)	Me Siento Solo (1978)

Te Tuve y Te Perdí (Eng.: "I Had You and I Lost You") is the second studio album released by Los Bukis in April 1977. The album was recorded mainly in early 1977.

== Track listing ==
All songs written and composed by Marco Antonio Solís

No.	Title	Length
1.	"Te Tuve y Te Perdi"	2:33
2.	"Cosita de Amor"	2:21
3.	"El Confundido"	3:02
4.	"Mi Chaparrita"	1:55
5.	"Solamente Pienso En Ti"	2:37
6.	"Una Noche Como Esta"	2:48
7.	"La Cumbia Michoacana"	2:43
8.	"Siento Perderte"	2:49
9.	"Que Ya Nunca Me Dejes"	2:22
10.	"Vivir Sin Ti"	2:48
