= A Donde Vas =

Studio album by Los Bukis
- Released: June 15, 1985
- Recorded: December 1984 - May 1985
- Studio: Hollywood Sound Recorders
- Genre: Grupero
- Length: 36:19
- Label: Melody
- Producer: Marco Antonio Solís

Los Bukis chronology
Mi Fantasía (1983)	A Donde Vas (1985)	Me Volvi a Acordar de Ti (1986)

A Donde Vas (English: Where Are You Going) is the ninth studio album by recorded Mexican Grupero band Los Bukis. It was released by Melody in June 1985 (see 1985 in music). The album reached number one on the Billboard Regional Mexican Albums.

Currently, this album is unavailable on streaming services in the United States.

== Track listing ==
All songs written and composed by Marco Antonio Solís except where noted.

No.	Title	Length
1.	"¿A dónde vas?"	4:05
2.	"Adiós, lo siento"	3:09
3.	"Loco por ti"	3:52
4.	"Con amor"	4:13
5.	"Fíjate, fíjate"	2:54
6.	"Cómo me haces falta"	3:56
7.	"Ámame"	3:30
8.	"Mañana"	3:19
9.	"Si tú te fueras de mí"	3:10
10.	"De veras"	4:15

== Credits and personnel ==
- Marco Antonio Solís: Lead Vocals, Guitar
- Joel Solís: Guitars, Backing Vocals
- Roberto Guadarrama: Keyboards, Trumpet, Backing vocals
- Eusebio "El Chivo" Cortez: Bass, Backing Vocals
- Pedro Sánchez: Drums
- Jose Javier Solis: Percussion, Backing Vocals
- Jose Pepe Guadarrama: Backing Keyboards, Percussion

== Charts ==
Chart (1985)	Peak position
US Regional Mexican Albums (Billboard)	1

== See also ==
- List of number-one Billboard Regional Mexican Albums from the 1980s
