= Presiento Que Voy a Llorar =

Studio album by Los Bukis
- Released: April 4, 1981
- Recorded: November 1980 - March 1981
- Genre: Grupero
- Length: 30:29
- Label: Fonovisa

Los Bukis chronology
| Me Muero Porque Seas Mi Novia (1980) | Presiento Que Voy a Llorar (1981) | Yo Te Necesito (1982) |

Presiento Que Voy a Llorar (I Feel Like I'm Going to Cry) is the sixth studio album released by Los Bukis in 1981.

== Track listing ==
All songs written and composed by Marco Antonio Solís except for Que Las Mantenga el Gobierno, and Quisiera Mejor Morir

| No. | Title | Length |
|---|---|---|
| 1. | "Por Bien de Los Dos" | 2:38 |
| 2. | "Te Encontraré" | 3:45 |
| 3. | "Si Te Sientes Tan Sola" | 2:47 |
| 4. | "Quisiera Mejor Morir" (written by Eusebio Cortez) | 2:47 |
| 5. | "Qué Las Mantenga el Gobierno" (written by Ramiro Aguilar) | 3:19 |
| 6. | "Si Me Quieres" | 2:56 |
| 7. | "Quiereme Como Soy" | 2:52 |
| 8. | "Presiento Que Voy a Llorar" | 3:28 |
| 9. | "Mi Error" | 2:47 |
| 10. | "Más Feliz Que Tu" | 3:15 |
