= Lo Nuestro Award for Pop Album of the Year =

Latin music award

Lo Nuestro Awards for Pop Album of the Year
- Awarded for: Pop Album of the Year
- Country: United States
- Presented by: Univision
- First award: 1989
- Final award: 2017

Highlights
- Most awards: Enrique Iglesias (4)
- Most nominations: Enrique Iglesias and Luis Miguel (8)
- Website: univision.com/premiolonuestro

The Lo Nuestro Award for Pop Album of the Year was an honor presented annually by American television network Univision at the Lo Nuestro Awards. The accolade was established to recognize the most talented performers of Latin music. The nominees and winners were originally selected by a voting poll conducted among program directors of Spanish-language radio stations in the United States and also based on chart performance on Billboard Latin music charts, with the results being tabulated and certified by the accounting firm Deloitte. However, since 2004, the winners are selected through an online survey. The trophy awarded is shaped in the form of a treble clef.

The award was first presented to Desde Andalucía by Spanish singer Isabel Pantoja in 1989. Spanish performer Enrique Iglesias holds the record for the most wins with four. Mexican singer Luis Miguel won consecutively in 1994 for Aries and in 1995 for Segundo Romance; both albums also earned the Grammy Award for Best Latin Pop Performance. In 1999, the Pop Album of the Year accolade was shared by Mexican band Maná and Shakira with Sueños Líquidos and Dónde Están los Ladrones?, respectively. Both albums were nominated at the 41st Grammy Awards for Best Latin Rock/Alternative Performance, with Maná receiving the award. Spanish band La 5ª Estación, and Mexican groups Camila, Maná, Pandora, RBD, Sin Bandera, and Santana are the only musical ensembles to receive the accolade, the latter group also won the Grammy Award for Album of the Year. In 2017, Primera Cita by American band CNCO became the last recipient of the award. Mexican singer Cristian Castro was the most nominated artist without a win, with six unsuccessful nominations.

== Winners and nominees ==
Listed below are the winners of the award for each year, as well as the other nominees.

Key	Meaning
‡	Indicates the winning album

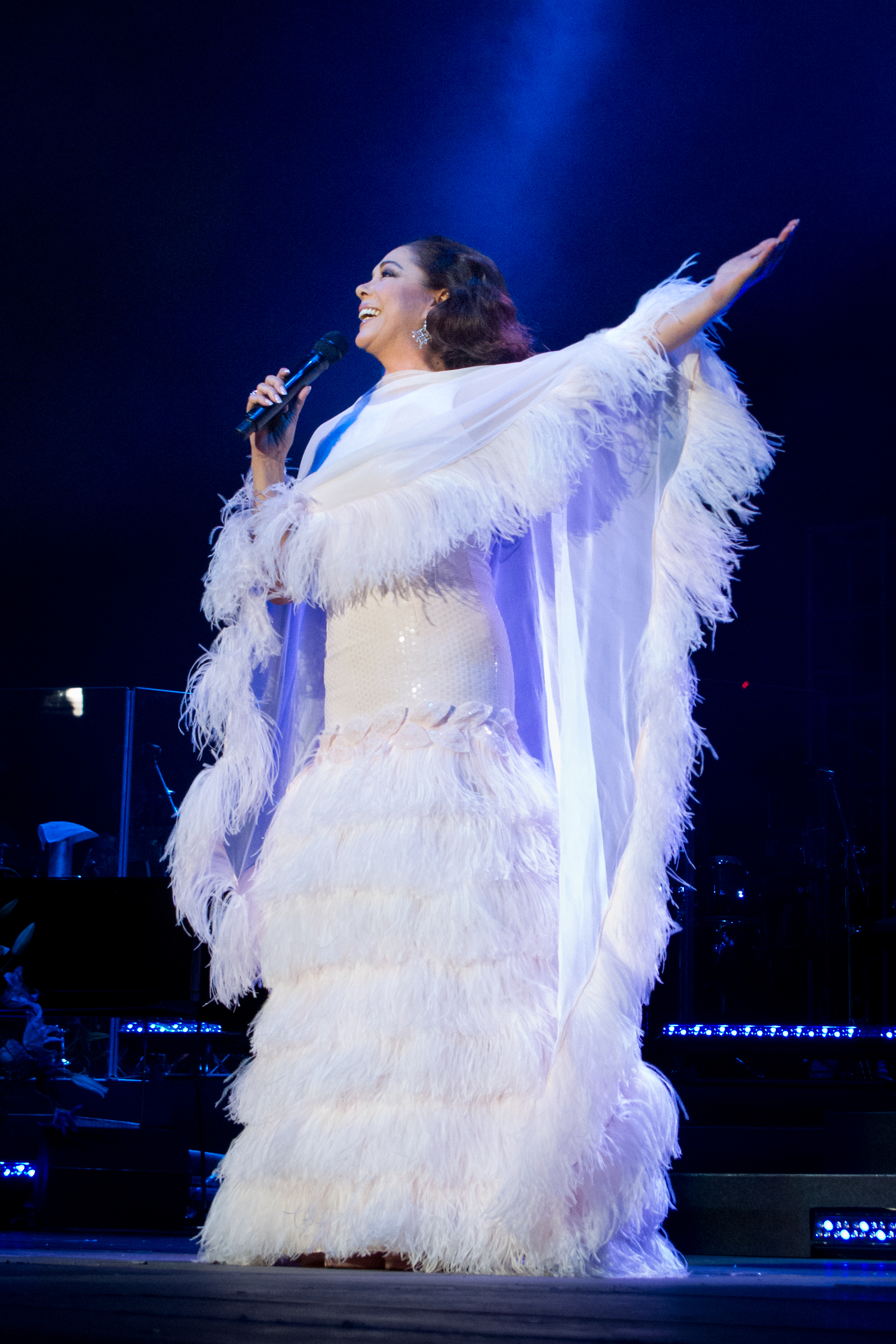
Spanish singer Isabel Pantoja (pictured in 2012), winner in 1989

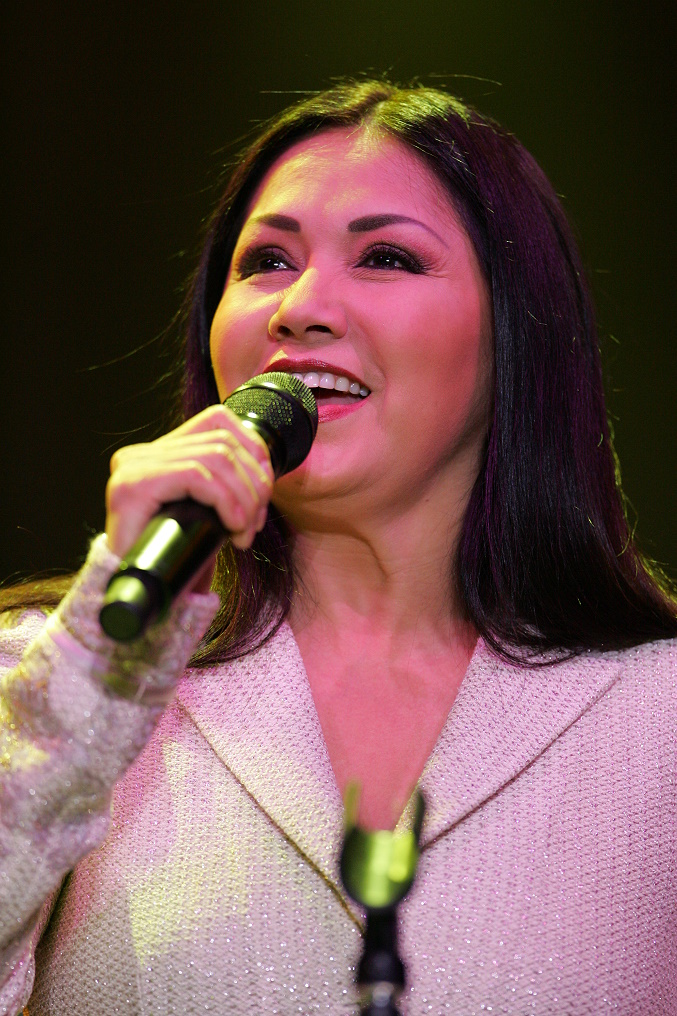
Mexican singer Ana Gabriel (pictured in 2006), winner in 1990 and 1991

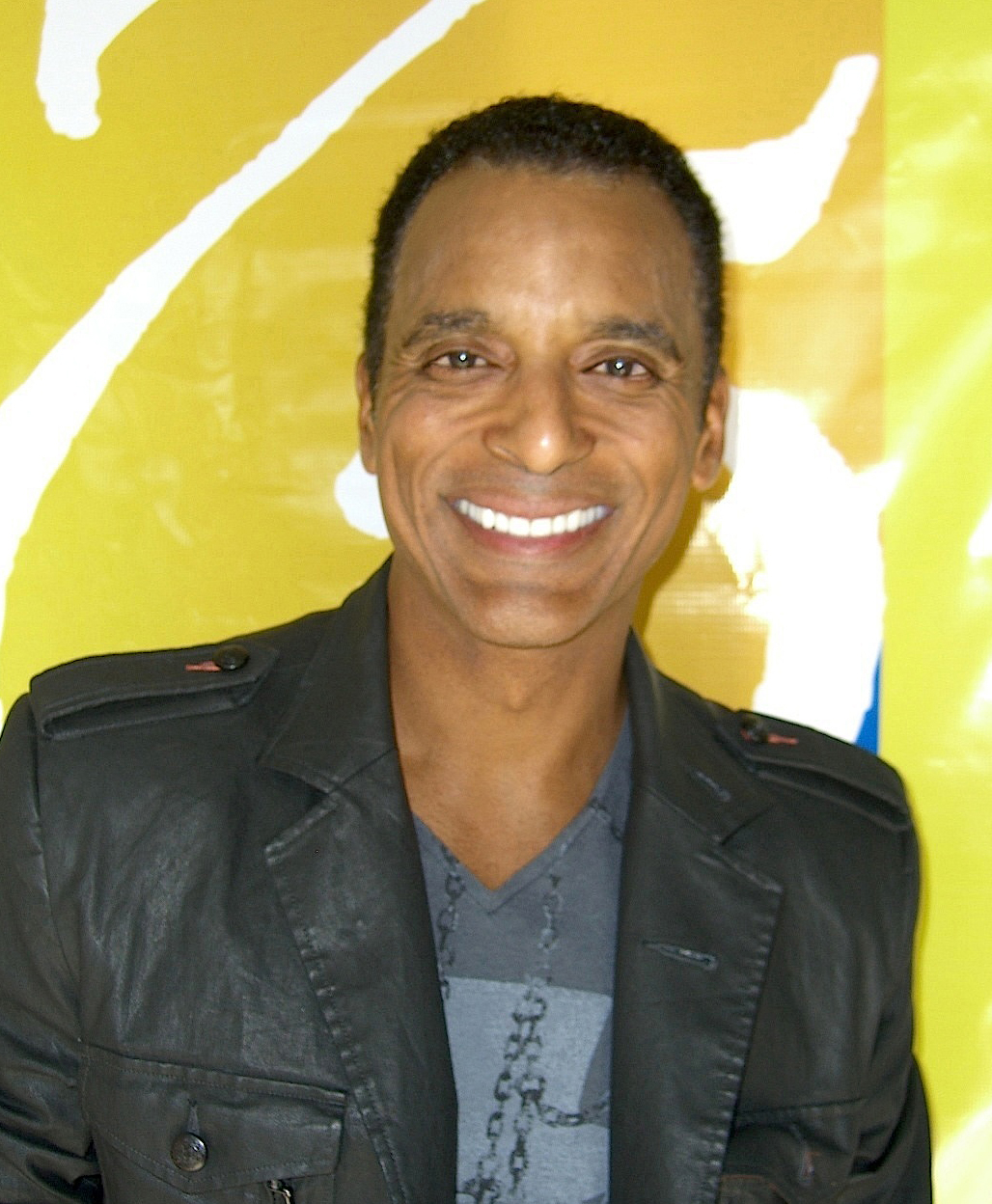
Cuban-American performer Jon Secada (pictured in 2011), winner in 1993

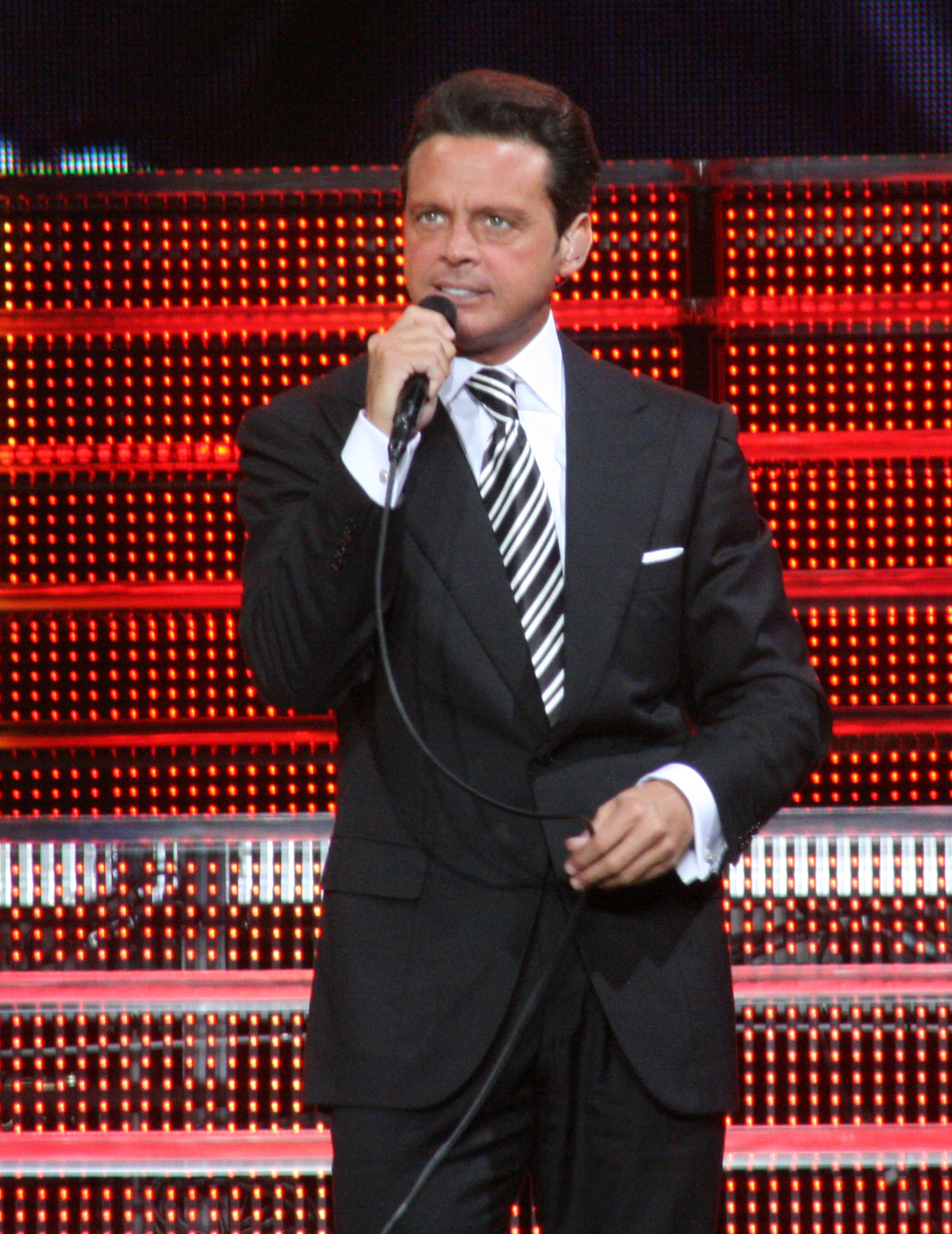
Mexican performer Luis Miguel (pictured in 2009), winner in 1994 and 1995

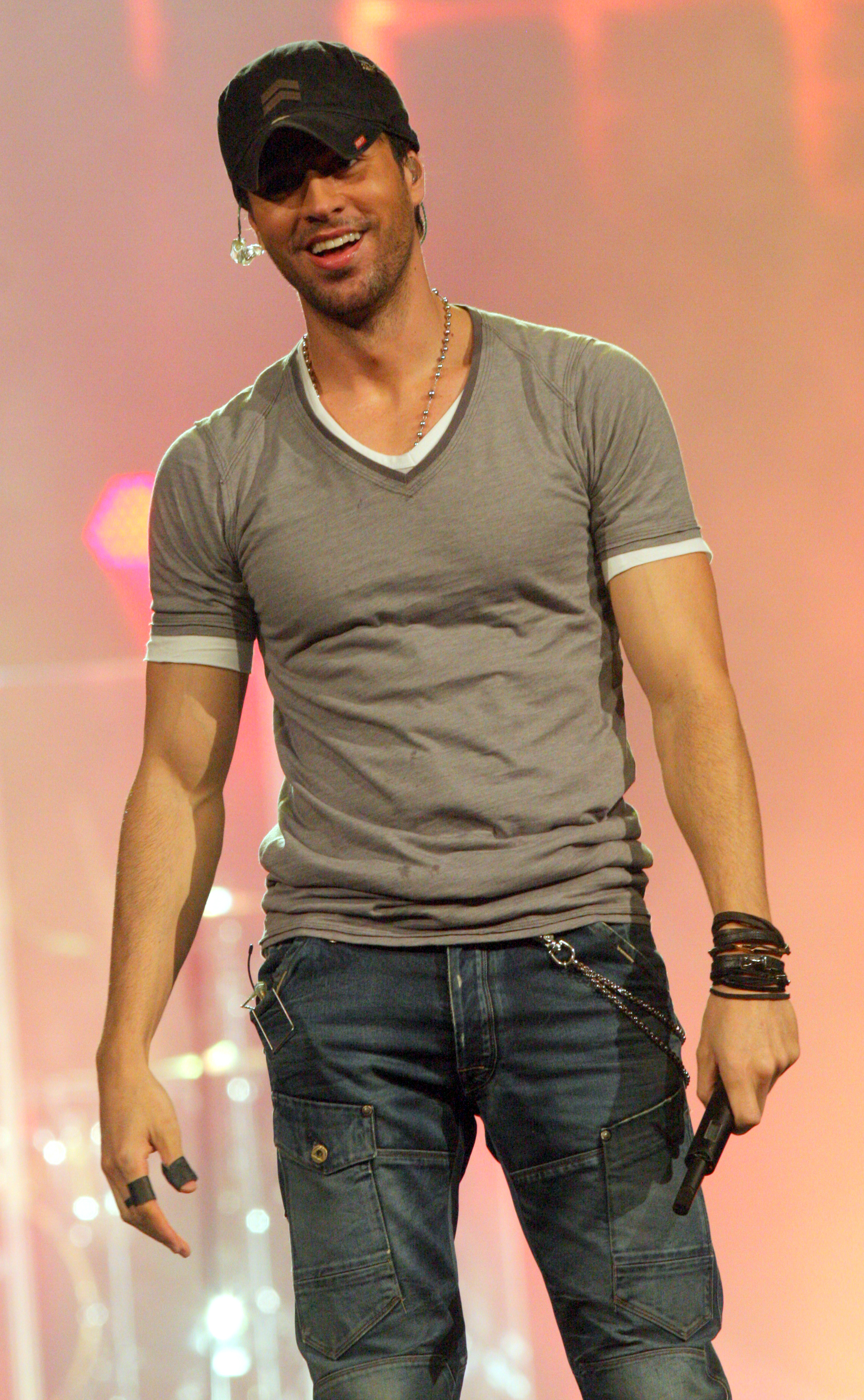
Spanish singer Enrique Iglesias (pictured in 2011), winner in 1996, 1997, 2009, and 2015

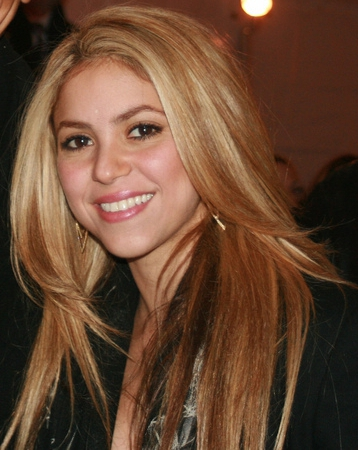
Colombian performer Shakira (pictured in 2009), winner in 1999, 2006 and 2012

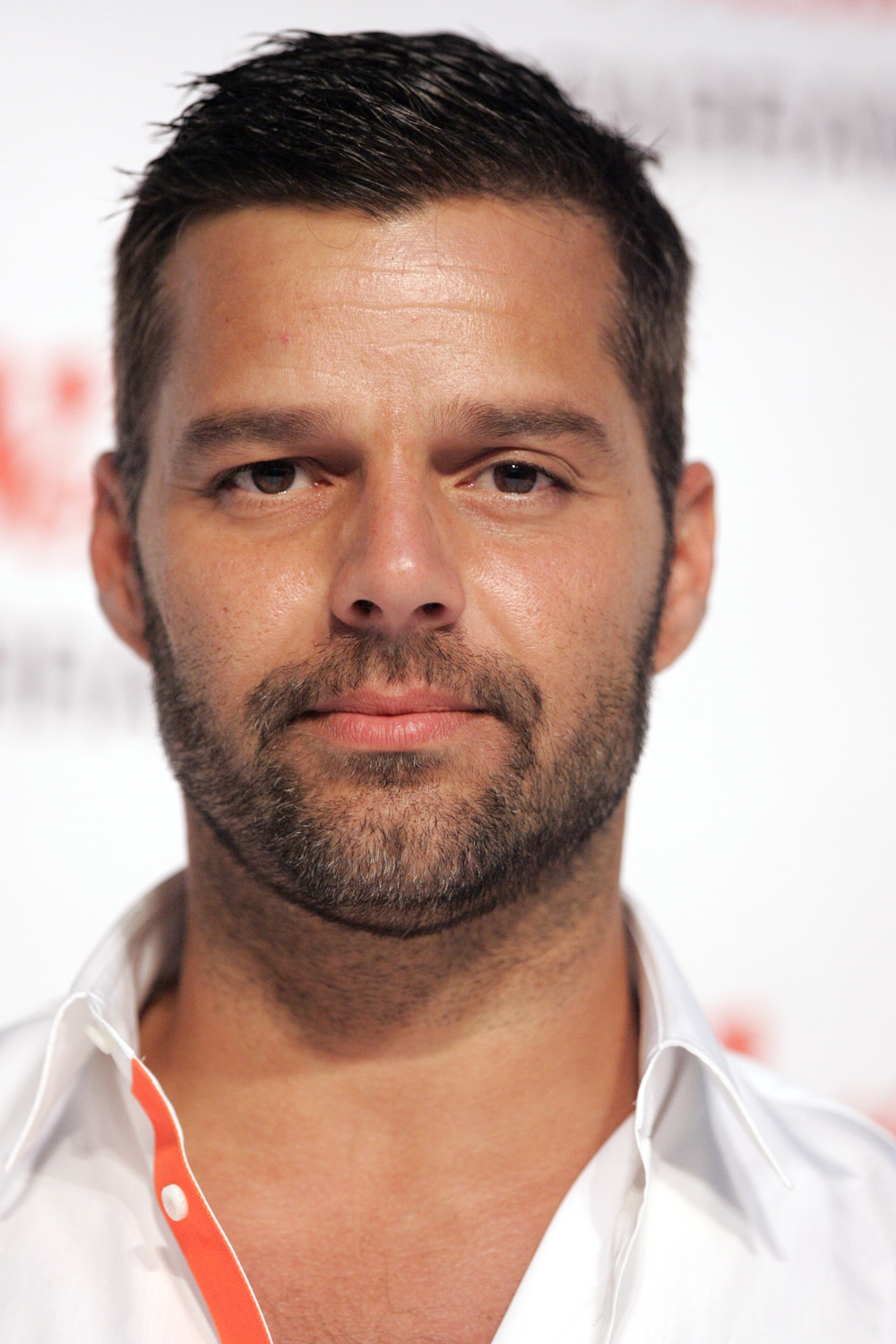
Puerto-Rican American singer Ricky Martin (pictured in 2013), winner in 2008 and 2016

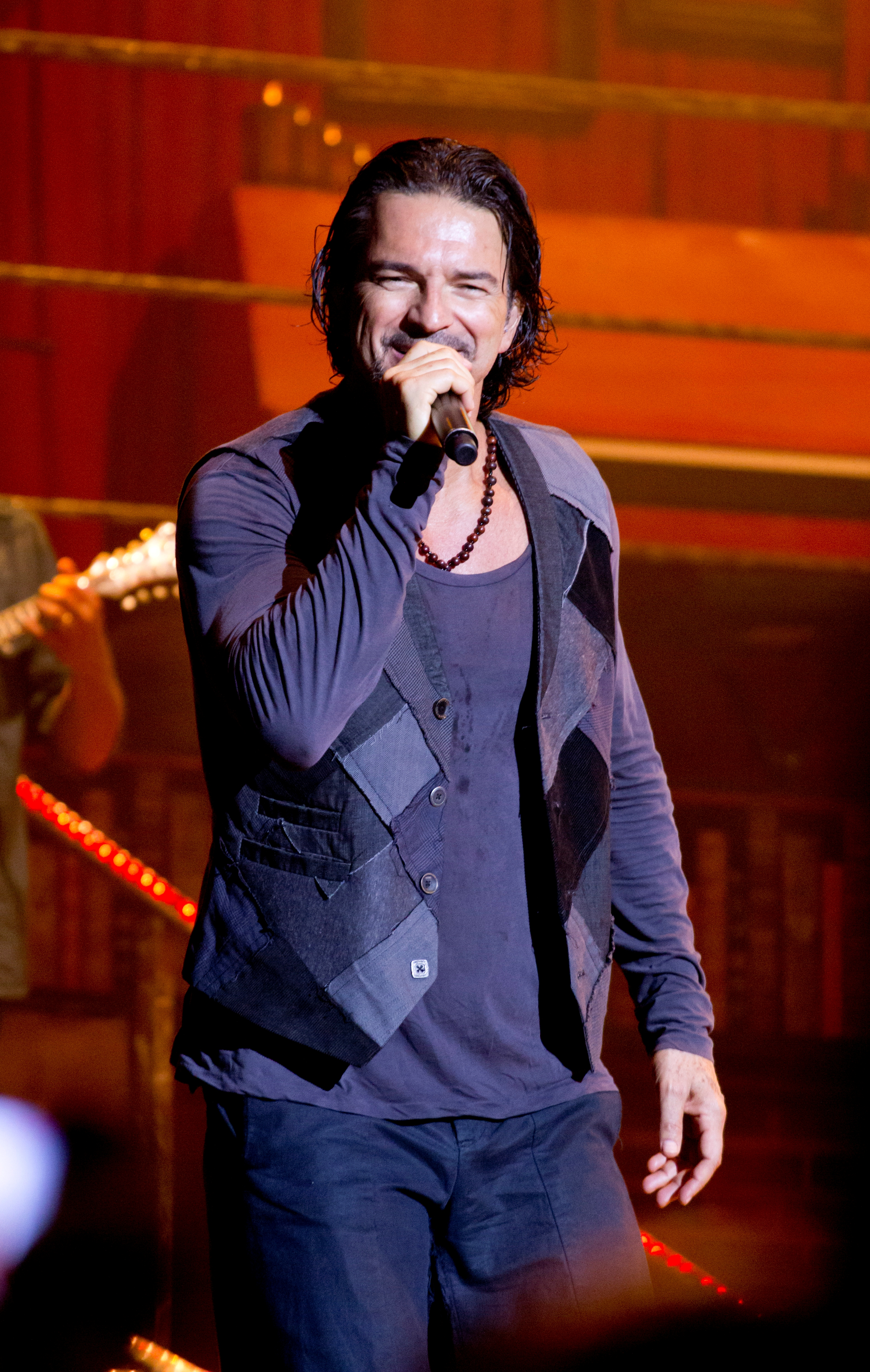
Guatemalan performer Ricardo Arjona (pictured in 2013), winner in 2004

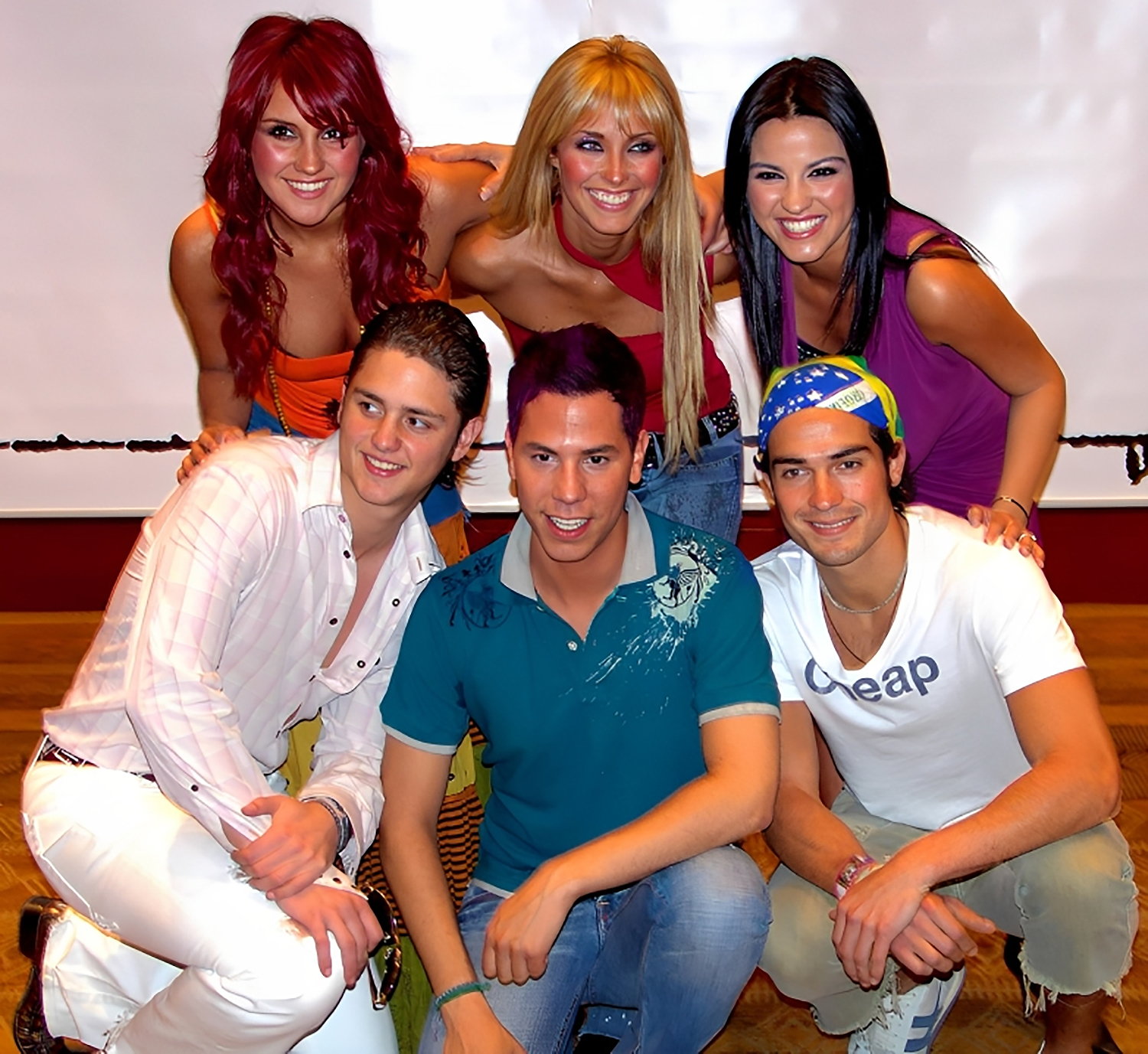
Mexican performer RBD (pictured in 2006), winner in 2007

Year	Album	Performer(s)	Ref
1989 (1st)	Desde Andalucía‡	Isabel Pantoja	
1989 (1st)	Con Todos Mis Sentidos	Braulio	
1989 (1st)	Entre Lunas	Emmanuel	
1989 (1st)	Soy Así	José José	
1989 (1st)	Señor Corazón	José Luis Rodríguez	
1990 (2nd)	Tierra de Nadie‡	Ana Gabriel	
1990 (2nd)	Chayanne	Chayanne	
1990 (2nd)	Raíces	Julio Iglesias	
1990 (2nd)	Ricardo Montaner, Vol. 2	Ricardo Montaner	
1990 (2nd)	Tengo Derecho a Ser Feliz	José Luis Rodríguez	
1991 (3rd)	Quién Como Tú‡	Ana Gabriel	
1991 (3rd)	20 Años	Luis Miguel	
1991 (3rd)	Cuando Yo Amo	Rudy La Scala	
1991 (3rd)	Dos	Myriam Hernández	
1991 (3rd)	Quiero Amanecer con Alguien	Daniela Romo	
1992 (4th)	Con Amor Eterno‡	Pandora	
1992 (4th)	En Vivo	Ana Gabriel	
1992 (4th)	Amada Más Que Nunca	Daniela Romo	
1992 (4th)	En el Último Lugar del Mundo	Ricardo Montaner	
1992 (4th)	En el Palacio de Bellas Artes	Juan Gabriel	
1993 (5th)	Jon Secada‡	Jon Secada	
1993 (5th)	Ilegal	Pandora	
1993 (5th)	Magneto	Magneto	
1993 (5th)	Nada Se Compara Contigo	Álvaro Torres	
1993 (5th)	Romance	Luis Miguel	
1994 (6th)	Aries‡	Luis Miguel	
1994 (6th)	Inalcanzable	Marco Antonio Solís and Los Bukis	
1994 (6th)	Luna	Ana Gabriel	
1994 (6th)	Metamorfosis	Ednita Nazario	
1994 (6th)	Otro Día Más Sin Verte	Jon Secada	
1995 (7th)	Segundo Romance‡	Luis Miguel	
1995 (7th)	Clásicos de la Provincia	Carlos Vives	
1995 (7th)	El Camino del Alma	Cristian Castro	
1995 (7th)	Gracias Por Esperar	Juan Gabriel	
1995 (7th)	Vida	La Mafia	
1996 (8th)	Enrique Iglesias‡	Enrique Iglesias	
1996 (8th)	El Concierto	Luis Miguel	
1996 (8th)	En Éxtasis	Thalía	
1996 (8th)	La Carretera	Julio Iglesias	
1996 (8th)	Por Amor a Mi Pueblo	Marco Antonio Solís and Los Bukis	
1997 (9th)	Vivir‡	Enrique Iglesias	
1997 (9th)	En Pleno Vuelo	Marco Antonio Solís	
1997 (9th)	Nada Es Igual...	Luis Miguel	
1997 (9th)	Nuevos Senderos	Olga Tañón	
1997 (9th)	Pies Descalzos	Shakira	
1998 (10th)	Me Estoy Enamorando‡	Alejandro Fernández	
1998 (10th)	Lo Mejor de Mí	Cristian Castro	
1998 (10th)	Marco	Marco Antonio Solís	
1998 (10th)	Vuelve	Ricky Martin	
1999 (11th)	Sueños Líquidos ‡	Maná	
1999 (11th)	Dónde Están los Ladrones?‡	Shakira	
1999 (11th)	Atado a Tu Amor	Chayanne	
1999 (11th)	Celebrando 25 Años de Juan Gabriel: En Concierto en el Palacio de Bellas Artes	Juan Gabriel	
1999 (11th)	Cosas del Amor	Enrique Iglesias	
2000 (12th)	Supernatural‡	Santana	
2000 (12th)	Amarte Es Un Placer	Luis Miguel	
2000 (12th)	Bailamos	Enrique Iglesias	
2000 (12th)	Mi Vida Sin Tu Amor	Cristian Castro	
2000 (12th)	Ricky Martin	Ricky Martin	
2001 (13th)	Paulina‡	Paulina Rubio	
2001 (13th)	Alma Caribeña	Gloria Estefan	
2001 (13th)	Arrasando	Thalía	
2001 (13th)	Caricias	Rocío Dúrcal	
2001 (13th)	Vivo	Luis Miguel	
2001 (13th)	Mi Reflejo	Christina Aguilera	
2002 (14th)	Abrázame Muy Fuerte ‡	Juan Gabriel	
2002 (14th)	Azul	Cristian Castro	
2002 (14th)	Galería Caribe	Ricardo Arjona	
2002 (14th)	Orígenes	Alejandro Fernández	
2002 (14th)	Más de Mi Alma	Marco Antonio Solís	
2002 (14th)	Mi Corazón	Jaci Velasquez	
2003 (15th)	Sin Bandera‡	Sin Bandera	
2003 (15th)	Hijas del Tomate	Las Ketchup	
2003 (15th)	MTV Unplugged	Alejandro Sanz	
2003 (15th)	Quizás	Enrique Iglesias	
2003 (15th)	Thalía	Thalía	
2004 (16th)	Santo Pecado‡	Ricardo Arjona	
2004 (16th)	Almas del Silencio	Ricky Martin	
2004 (16th)	Estrella Guía	Alexandre Pires	
2004 (16th)	Millie	Millie Corretjer	
2004 (16th)	Rojo relativo	Tiziano Ferro	
2005 (17th)	De Viaje‡	Sin Bandera	
2005 (17th)	Abrazar la Vida	Luis Fonsi	
2005 (17th)	Pau-Latina	Paulina Rubio	
2005 (17th)	Seducción	Jennifer Peña	
2005 (17th)	Stop	Franco De Vita	
2006 (18th)	Fijación Oral Vol. 1‡	Shakira	
2006 (18th)	Escucha	Laura Pausini	
2006 (18th)	Fuego	Kumbia Kings	
2006 (18th)	Paso a Paso	Luis Fonsi	
2006 (18th)	Todo el Año	Obie Bermúdez	
2007 (19th)	Nuestro Amor‡	RBD	
2007 (19th)	Adentro	Ricardo Arjona	
2007 (19th)	Días Felices	Cristian Castro	
2007 (19th)	El Sexto Sentido: Re+Loaded	Thalía	
2007 (19th)	Mañana	Sin Bandera	
2008 (20th)	MTV Unplugged‡	Ricky Martin	
2008 (20th)	Celestial	RBD	
2008 (20th)	El Tren de los Momentos	Alejandro Sanz	
2008 (20th)	Ayer Fue Kumbia Kings, Hoy Es Kumbia All Starz	A.B. Quintanilla Presents Kumbia All Starz	
2008 (20th)	Secuencia	Reik	
2009 (21st)	95/08 Éxitos‡	Enrique Iglesias	
2009 (21st)	Empezar Desde Cero	RBD	
2009 (21st)	Entre Mariposas	Yuridia	
2009 (21st)	Fuerza	Alejandra Guzmán	
2009 (21st)	Tarde o Temprano	Tommy Torres	
2010 (22nd)	Sin Frenos‡	La 5ª Estación	
2010 (22nd)	5to Piso	Ricardo Arjona	
2010 (22nd)	Dos	Fanny Lú	
2010 (22nd)	El Culpable Soy Yo	Cristian Castro	
2010 (22nd)	Gran City Pop	Paulina Rubio	
2011 (23rd)	Dejarte de Amar‡	Camila	
2011 (23rd)	De Mi Puño y Letra	Carlos Baute	
2011 (23rd)	Euphoria	Enrique Iglesias	
2011 (23rd)	No Hay Imposibles	Chayanne	
2011 (23rd)	Paraíso Express	Alejandro Sanz	
2012 (24th)	Sale el Sol‡	Shakira	
2012 (24th)	Amarte Bien	Carlos Baute	
2012 (24th)	Gloria	Gloria Trevi	
2012 (24th)	Música + Alma + Sexo	Ricky Martin	
2012 (24th)	Peligro	Reik	
2013 (25th)	Joyas Prestadas: Pop‡	Jenni Rivera	
2013 (25th)	Brava!	Paulina Rubio	
2013 (25th)	¿Con Quién Se Queda El Perro?	Jesse & Joy	
2013 (25th)	Independiente	Ricardo Arjona	
2013 (25th)	La Música No Se Toca	Alejandro Sanz	
2014 (26th)	Habítame Siempre‡	Thalía	
2014 (26th)	12 Historias	Tommy Torres	
2014 (26th)	El Amor Manda	América Sierra	
2014 (26th)	Entre Venas	Rigú	
2014 (26th)	Faith, Hope y Amor	Frankie J	
2015 (27th)	Sex and Love‡	Enrique Iglesias	
2015 (27th)	20 – Grandes Éxitos	Laura Pausini	
2015 (27th)	Globall	3Ball MTY	
2015 (27th)	Gracias Por Estar Aqui	Marco Antonio Solís	
2015 (27th)	Loco de Amor	Juanes	
2016 (28th)	A Quien Quiera Escuchar‡	Ricky Martin	
2016 (28th)	Amore Mío	Thalía	
2016 (28th)	Cama Incendiada	Maná	
2016 (28th)	Creo en Mi	Natalia Jiménez	
2016 (28th)	Sirope	Alejandro Sanz	
2017 (29th)	Primera Cita‡	CNCO	
2017 (29th)	Des/Amor	Reik	
2017 (29th)	Latina	Thalía	
2017 (29th)	Renacer	Christian Daniel	
2017 (29th)	Un Besito Más	Jesse & Joy	
2021 (33rd)	Por Primera Vez‡	Camilo	
2021 (33rd)	Aire (Versión Día)	Jesse & Joy	
2021 (33rd)	Blanco	Ricardo Arjona	
2021 (33rd)	Colegio	Cali y El Dandee	
2021 (33rd)	Más Futuro Que Pasado	Juanes	
2021 (33rd)	Mesa Para Dos	Kany García	
2021 (33rd)	Munay	Pedro Capó	
2021 (33rd)	Pausa	Ricky Martin	
2021 (33rd)	Que Quiénes Somos	CNCO	
2021 (33rd)	20—21	Reik	
2022 (34th)	Déjà Vu‡	CNCO	
2022 (34th)	Desamorfosis	Thalía	
2022 (34th)	El Amor en los Tiempos del Perreo	Piso 21	
2022 (34th)	El Playlist de Anoche	Tommy Torres	
2022 (34th)	La Más Bella	Ednita Nazario	
2022 (34th)	Leyendas	Carlos Rivera	
2022 (34th)	Mis Manos	Camilo	
2022 (34th)	Revelación	Selena Gomez	
2022 (34th)	Rifresh	Mau y Ricky	
2022 (34th)	Sin Miedo (del Amor y Otros Demonios)	Kali Uchis	

== Multiple wins and nominations ==
Number	Performer(s)
Wins
4	Enrique Iglesias
3	Shakira
2	Ana Gabriel
2	CNCO
2	Luis Miguel
2	Ricky Martin
2	Sin Bandera
Nominations
8	Enrique Iglesias
8	Luis Miguel
7	Thalía
6	Cristian Castro
6	Ricky Martin
5	Ricardo Arjona
5	Marco Antonio Solís
5	Alejandro Sanz
4	Ana Gabriel
4	Juan Gabriel
4	Paulina Rubio
4	Shakira
3	Chayanne
3	RBD
3	Ricardo Montaner
3	Sin Bandera
2	Carlos Baute
2	Los Bukis
2	Alejandro Fernández
2	Luis Fonsi
2	Jesse & Joy
2	Julio Iglesias
2	Maná
2	Pandora
2	Laura Pausini
2	Reik
2	José Luis Rodríguez
2	Daniela Romo
2	Tommy Torres

== See also ==
- Grammy Award for Best Latin Pop Album
- Latin Grammy Award for Best Female Pop Vocal Album
- Latin Grammy Award for Best Contemporary Pop Vocal Album
- Latin Grammy Award for Best Male Pop Vocal Album
- Latin Grammy Award for Best Pop Album by a Duo or Group with Vocals
- Latin Grammy Award for Best Traditional Pop Vocal Album
