= Tu Cárcel =

Single by Los Bukis

from the album Me Volvi a Acordar de Ti
- Language: Spanish
- B-side: "El Regreso Del Alambrado" "Este Adiós" (Argentina release) "Me Volví a Acordar de Ti" (Ecuador release)
- Released: 1987
- Genre: Grupero bolero
- Label: Fonovisa
- Songwriter: Marco Antonio Solís
- Producers: Marco Antonio Solís; Joel Solís

"Tu Cárcel" (English: "Your Prison") is a song by Mexican grupero band Los Bukis. Written by lead singer Marco Antonio Solís and produced by him and his cousin Joel Solís, it was released as the first single from the band's tenth studio album, Me Volvi a Acordar de Ti (1987).

== Background ==
In 1987, Los Bukis released their tenth studio album, Me Volvi a Acordar de Ti, which peaked at number 6 on the Billboard Latin Pop Albums chart. "Tu Cárcel", released as the album's first single, went on to become the album's most commercially successful track, peaking at number 2 on Radio Mil's Notitas Musicales chart and at number 3 on the Billboard Hot Latin Songs chart in the US. The song has been recorded by many artists, notably Enanitos Verdes while performing live in 2004, and is often regarded as one of the band's signature songs.

== Charts ==
Chart performance for "Tu Cárcel"
Chart (1987)	Peak position
Mexico (Notitas Musicales)	2
US Hot Latin Songs (Billboard)	3

== Other versions ==
- Karol Sevilla and Michael Ronda recorded a version for the soundtrack Modo amar to the third season of the teen TV series Soy Luna.
- En 2004, the Argentinean band Enanitos Verdes recorded a version of this song as well. This new version of "Tu Cárcel" brought the song to new generations and was at the top of many music rankings for various weeks.
- In 2026, the Colombian band Morat released their version of the song, with the music video for their version making homage to Marciano Cantero for his 2004 cover.

== See also ==
- List of best-selling Latin singles
