= En Pleno Vuelo =

Studio album by Marco Antonio Solís
- Released: July 24, 1996
- Recorded: 1996
- Genre: Latin pop
- Length: 41:09
- Label: Fonovisa
- Producer: Marco Antonio Solís

Marco Antonio Solís chronology
En Pleno Vuelo (1996)	Marco (1997)

Singles from En Pleno Vuelo
- 1. "Recuerdos, Tristeza y Soledad" Released: May 27, 1996; 2. "Qué Pena Me Das" Released: September 16, 1996; 3. "Muévete" Released: November 25, 1996; 4. "Así Como Te Conocí" Released: January 13, 1997; 5. "O Soy, O Fui" Released: March 10, 1997; 6. "Mi Último Adiós" Released: April 28, 1997; 7. "Para Que Seas Feliz" Released: May 19, 1997; 8. "La Masoquista" Released: June 2, 1997

En Pleno Vuelo (Eng.: "In Full Flight") is the debut studio album by Marco Antonio Solís as a solo artist. It was released on July 24, 1996. After 20 years of great success with the band Los Bukis, Solís began a solo career with this album release. It was certified gold by the RIAA in the United States. At the 9th Lo Nuestro Awards the album received a nomination for Pop Album of the Year.

== Track listing ==
All songs written and composed by Marco Antonio Solís

No.	Title	Length
1.	"Para Que Seas Feliz"	4:49
2.	"Muévete"	3:33
3.	"Asi Como Te Conoci"	4:19
4.	"Recuerdos, Tristeza y Soledad"	4:26
5.	"El Masoquista"	3:33
6.	"Que Pena Me Das"	4:04
7.	"Mi Ultimo Adios"	3:40
8.	"Pirekua Michoacána"	4:34
9.	"O Soy, O Fui"	3:58
10.	"Desde Afuera"	4:13

== Chart performance ==
Chart (1996)	Peak position
US Billboard Top Latin Albums	3
US Billboard Latin Pop Albums	3
US Billboard Heatseekers	13

== Sales and certifications ==
Region	Certification	Certified units/sales
United States (RIAA)	Gold	500,000^{^}
^{^} Shipments figures based on certification alone.
