= Marco (Marco Antonio Solís album) =

Studio album by Marco Antonio Solís
- Released: September 30, 1997
- Recorded: 1997
- Genres: Latin pop, Mariachi
- Length: 46:11
- Label: Fonovisa
- Producer: Marco Antonio Solís

Marco Antonio Solís chronology
En Pleno Vuelo (1996)	Marco (1997)	Trozos de Mi Alma (1999)

Singles from Marco Antonio Solís
- 1. "La Venia Bendita" Released: July 28, 1997; 2. "Tu Compañero" Released: November 24, 1997; 3. "Me Vas a Hacer Llorar" Released: January 19, 1998; 4. "Ya Aprenderás" Released: April 6, 1998; 5. "Casas de Cartón" Released: July 13, 1998

Marco is the second studio album by Marco Antonio Solís. It was released on September 30, 1997. It was nominated for a Lo Nuestro Award for Pop Album of the Year.

== Track listing ==
All songs written and composed by Marco Antonio Solís, except where otherwise noted

No.	Title	Length
1.	"Desde Que Te Perdí"	3:40
2.	"Tu Compañero"	3:32
3.	"Tu Dulce y Mi Sal"	6:13
4.	"Un Par de Humanos"	4:40
5.	"Ya Aprenderas"	3:46
6.	"Que Haces Ahora"	3:41
7.	"Me Vas a Hacer Llorar"	3:21
8.	"Los Dos Contra Mi"	3:45
9.	"Tu Par"	3:56
10.	"Hermano"	5:07
11.	"La Venia Bendita"	3:11
12.	"Casas de Cartón" (written by Ali Primera)	4:51

== Charts ==
Chart (1997)	Peak position
US Billboard Top Latin Albums	3
US Billboard Latin Pop Albums	3
US Billboard Heatseekers	16

== Sales and certifications ==
Region	Certification	Certified units/sales
Argentina (CAPIF)	2× Platinum	120,000^{^}
United States (RIAA)	Gold	500,000^{^}
^{^} Shipments figures based on certification alone.
