= Por Amor a Mi Pueblo =

Studio album by Marco Antonio Solís and Los Bukis
- Released: May 2, 1995
- Recorded: September 1994 - April 1995
- Genre: Grupero
- Length: 47:57
- Label: Fonovisa
- Producer: Homero Patron

Marco Antonio Solís and Los Bukis chronology
| Inalcanzable (1993) | Por Amor a Mi Pueblo (1995) |

Singles from Por Amor a Mi Pueblo
- 1. "Una Mujer Como Tú" Released: March 13, 1995; 2. "Será Mejor Que Te Vayas" Released: July 10, 1995; 3. "Himno a La Humildad" Released: Sept 4, 1995; 4. "Por Amor a Mi Pueblo" Released: November 27, 1995; 5. "Si Ya No Te Vuelvo a Ver" Released: January 8, 1996; 6. "Equivocado" Released: February 26, 1996; 7. "Te Amo, Mamá" Released: April 15, 1996

Por Amor a Mi Pueblo (Eng.: "For Love of My People") is the sixteenth and final studio album released by Los Bukis on May 2, 1995. The album was certified gold in the United States by the RIAA. It was nominated for Pop Album of the Year at the Premio Lo Nuestro 1996.

== Track listing ==
All songs written and composed by Marco Antonio Solís except for Por Amor a Mi Pueblo

| No. | Title | Length |
|---|---|---|
| 1. | "Tú Eres Mi Lugar" | 4:34 |
| 2. | "Equivocado" | 4:00 |
| 3. | "Una Mujer Como Tu" | 3:32 |
| 4. | "Bajo los Ojos de Dios" | 3:47 |
| 5. | "No Me Esperes Ya" | 3:51 |
| 6. | "Si Ya No Te Vuelvo a Ver" | 3:50 |
| 7. | "Será Mejor Que Te Vayas" | 5:01 |
| 8. | "Junto a la Mujer Que Amo" | 3:43 |
| 9. | "Por Amor a Mi Pueblo" (written by Manolo Marroquín) | 3:46 |
| 10. | "Corazón Limpio"" | 3:01 |
| 11. | "Te Amo Mamá" | 4:47 |
| 12. | "Himno a la Humildad" | 4:27 |

== Chart performance ==
| Chart (1995) | Peak position |
|---|---|
| US Billboard Top Latin Albums | 8 |
| US Billboard Latin Pop Albums | 3 |
| US Billboard Heatseekers Albums | 24 |

== Sales and certifications ==
| Region | Certification | Certified units/sales |
|---|---|---|
| United States (RIAA) | Gold | 500,000^{^} |
^{^} Shipments figures based on certification alone.
