= Trozos de Mi Alma =

Studio album by Marco Antonio Solís
- Released: January 26, 1999
- Recorded: 1998
- Studios: After Hours (Miami, Florida); O'Henry Studios (Burbank, California); Andora Studios (Hollywood, California)
- Genres: Latin pop; latin ballad
- Length: 41:28
- Label: Fonovisa
- Producer: Bebu Silvetti

Marco Antonio Solís chronology
Marco Antonio Solís (1997)	Trozos de Mi Alma (1999)	Más de Mi Alma (2001)

Singles from Trozos de Mi Alma
- 1. "Si No Te Hubieras Ido (1998)"; 2. "Sigue Sin Mí (1999)"; 3. "Invéntame (1999)"; 4. "Si Te Pudiera Mentir (2000)"; 5. "El Peor de Mis Fracasos (2000)"

Trozos de Mi Alma (English: Pieces of My Soul) is the third studio album recorded by Mexican singer-songwriter Marco Antonio Solís. It was released by Fonovisa Records on 26 January 1999 (see 1999 in music). This album became his first number-one set on the Billboard Top Latin Albums, and it was certified platinum by the Recording Industry Association of America for sales over 1,000,000 units in United States; it also received a diamond accreditation in Mexico in 2004.

Trozos de Mi Alma features songs written by Solís, but previously recorded by different artists, including Enrique Iglesias, Olga Tañón, Beatríz Adriana, Dulce, María Sorté and Rocío Dúrcal, among others. His version of the track "Si No Te Hubieras Ido" was included on the soundtrack for the Mexican film Y Tu Mamá También (2001). It was also featured as the opening theme for the Mexican telenovela Salomé (2001–2002), produced by Juan Osorio starring Guy Ecker and Edith González. "Sigue Sin Mi" was also featured as the opening theme for the Mexican telenovela Siempre te amaré (2000), produced by Juan Osorio starring Laura Flores, Fernando Carrillo and Arturo Peniche.

== Track listing ==
All songs written and composed by Marco Antonio Solís

No.	Title	Originally performed by	Length
1.	"Si No Te Hubieras Ido"	Marisela (1984)	4:48
2.	"Amor en Silencio"	Dulce (1988)	3:58
3.	"Se Va Muriendo Mi Alma"	María Sorté (1990)	4:35
4.	"Mi Eterno Amor Secreto"	Olga Tañón (1996)	3:46
5.	"Sigue Sin Mí"	Beatriz Adriana (1986)	4:02
6.	"Si Te Pudiera Mentir"	Rocío Dúrcal (1990)	4:21
7.	"La Última Parte"	Ariel (1998)	4:38
8.	"Invéntame"	Enrique Iglesias (1995)	3:31
9.	"A Qué Me Quedo Contigo"	Rocío Dúrcal (1990)	4:18
10.	"El Peor de Mis Fracasos"	María Sorté (1990)	4:10

== Charts ==
Chart (1999–2000)	Peak position
US Billboard 200	157
US Billboard Top Latin Albums	1
US Billboard Top Heatseekers	9
US Billboard Independent Albums	16
US Billboard Latin Pop Albums	1

== Sales and certifications ==
Region	Certification	Certified units/sales
Argentina (CAPIF)	Platinum	60,000^{^}
Mexico (AMPROFON)	Diamond	1,000,000^{^}
United States (RIAA)	Platinum	598,000
^{^} Shipments figures based on certification alone.

== See also ==
- 1999 in Latin music
- List of number-one Billboard Top Latin Albums of 1999
- List of best-selling Latin albums in the United States
- List of best-selling Latin albums
- List of best-selling albums in Mexico
