= Alí Primera =

Venezuelan musician, composer, poet and political activist

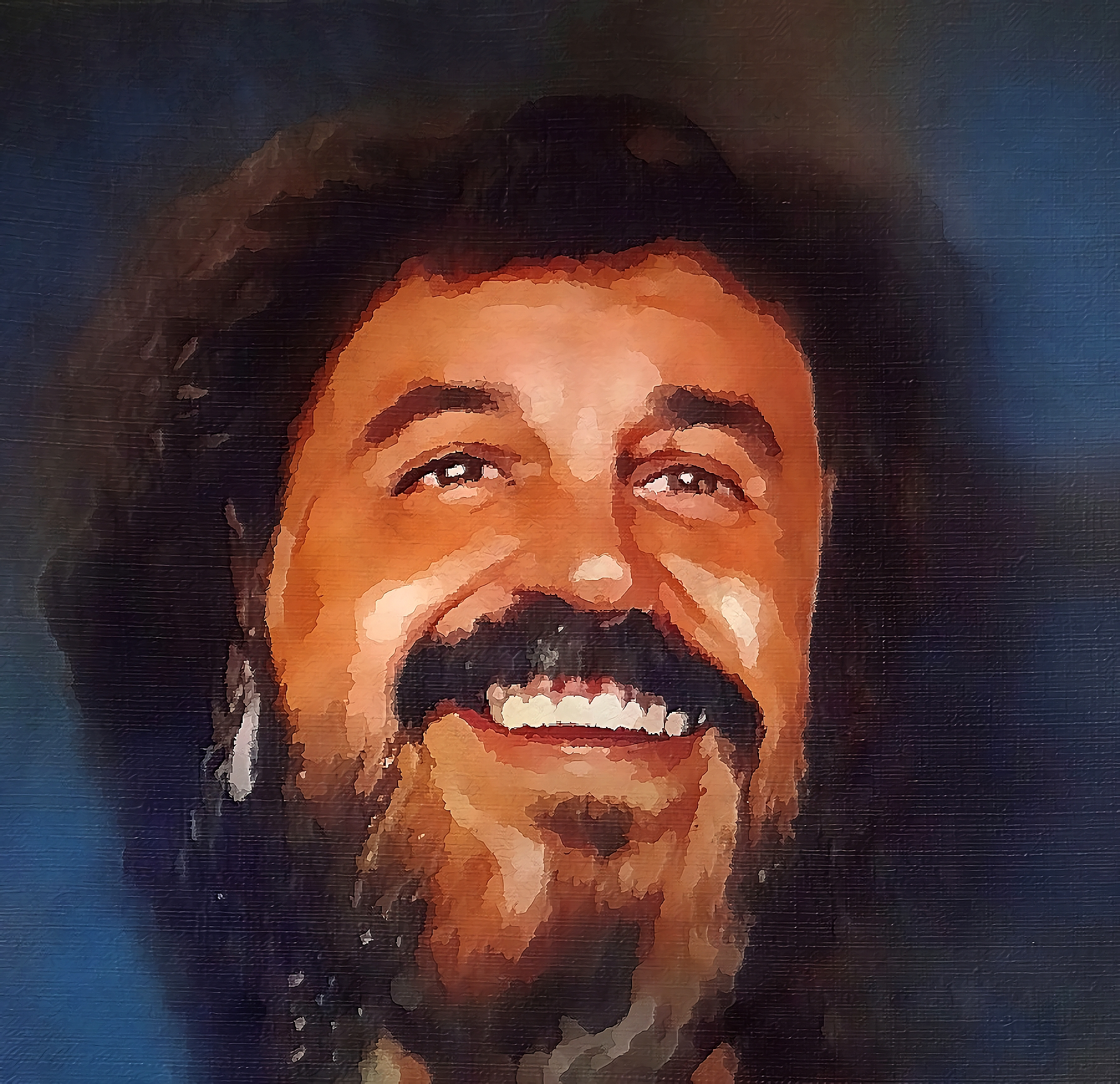
- Oil portrait of Alí Primera

Background information
- Born: Ely Rafael Primera Rosell; 31 October 1941; Coro, Venezuela
- Died: 16 February 1985 (aged 43) Caracas, Venezuela
- Genres: Folk; Nueva canción
- Occupations: Singer-songwriter; poet; social activist
- Instruments: Vocals; Spanish guitar; Cuatro
- Years active: 1971-1985

Ely Rafael Primera Rosell (31 October 1941 – 16 February 1985) known artistically as Alí Primera, was a Venezuelan musician, composer, poet, and political activist. He was born in Coro, Falcón State, Venezuela and died in Caracas. He was one of the best known representatives of Nueva canción ("new song") in Venezuela – his songs "condemning exploitation and repression, and celebrating resistance, struck a chord among a wide public," and he is popularly known in Venezuela as El Cantor del Pueblo (The People's Singer). In 2005, the government of Venezuela declared his music to be an example of the national heritage of Venezuela.

== Early life ==
Alí Primera was baptized as Rafael Sebastián Primera Rosell by his parents Antonio Primera and Carmen Adela Rossell. He was known as Alí because due to the Arabic background of his grandparents. Living in poverty since childhood, Primera's father, Antonio, died when he was three. Antonio, who served as an official in Coro, died accidentally during a shooting incident that occurred when some prisoners tried to escape from the local prison in 1945. As Primera was still quite young when his father died, he travelled with his mother and two siblings through different towns on the Paraguaná Peninsula, including San José, Caja de Agua (where he graduated from elementary school), Las Piedras and finally La Vela de Coro, located near Punto Fijo. It was in this town that Primera worked a number of odd jobs, from a shoeshiner at the age of 6 to a boxer, due to the miserable conditions his family lived in. These jobs did not, however, discourage him from continuing his studies.

In 1960, Primera and his family left La Vela looking for a better life and moved to Caracas, where he enrolled in the Liceo Caracas in order to complete his education. After he graduated in 1964, he enrolled at the Central University of Venezuela to study Chemistry at the Faculty of Science. While at the university, he started singing and composing music. At first, it was a just a hobby for him, but it gradually came to take up all of his time. His first songs, "Humanidad" and "No basta rezar", the latter of which was presented at the Festival of Protest Songs organized by the Universidad de los Andes in 1967, propelled him to fame.

== Musical career ==
Between 1969 and 1973, Primera lived in Europe thanks to a scholarship he received in 1968 from the Communist Party of Venezuela to continue his studies in Romania. Once in Europe, he earned a living by washing dishes and occasionally sang in places that respected his work. He recorded his first album Gente de mi tierra in a studio in Germany. Primera's compositions talk about the suffering of the people, destroyed by poverty and social inequality. Because of his songs, he quickly made his way into the hearts of the people and soon became known as El Cantor del Pueblo or The People's Singer. Primera found his own record label, Cigarrón, to release his music more easily. Cigarrón's commercial distribution was handled by the Promus record company.

After serving in the Communist Youth of Venezuela (Juventud Comunista de Venezuela) and in the Communist Party of Venezuela, Primera participated in the political beginnings of a new party called the Movement for Socialism, working during the first electoral campaign of José Vicente Rangel in 1973. Latin America. From 1973 until his death, he recorded 13 full-length albums and participated in numerous festivals throughout Latin America. Among Alí's best known songs are "Paraguaná, paraguanera", "José Leonardo", "Techos de cartón", "Cruz Salmerón Acosta" (dedicated to the Venezuelan poet of the same name), "Reverón" (in memory of the Venezuelan painter Armando Reverón), "Flora y Ceferino", and "Canción mansa para un pueblo bravo ".

Alí played at factories, schools, union buildings, and, frequently, the Aula Magna of the Central University of Venezuela, his alma mater.

Two scholars of the works of Alí Primera, Jesus Franquis and Andrés Castillo, noted that even though his work was considered within the genre of protest songs, which became popular in Venezuela between 1970 and 1980, Primera insisted on always calling his genre "Canción Necesaria" ("necessary songs").

In Barquisimeto Primera met his future wife, Sol Musset, who herself had just won the "La Voz Liceista" contest and who subsequently appeared at the "Los Venezolanos primero" festival in 1977. The couple had five children: María Fernanda and María Angela, now residents in Canada, as well as Sandino, Jorge, Servando, Florentino and Juan Simón. Servando and Florentino became a music duo under the name Servando & Florentino.

== Primera's work at the time of his death ==
Primera died in a car accident on 16 February 1985 on the Autopista Valle-Coche in Caracas. Before his death, Alí Primera had begun recording a new album at the end of 1984 that combined the recurring themes of his songs with beats that he had never used before such as the gaita from the Zulia State of Venezuela.

Four of the songs recorded by Primera had only vocals. When he died, Alí had been driving back from a recording session. Weeks after the accident, his brother José Montecano (also a musician and composer) decided to complete the project. The album was called "Por si no lo sabía" (If you didn't know'); its release was a success and was the first of Ali's albums to make it into TV promotion. Alí never appeared on TV during his lifetime.

The following year, Primera's Cigarrón label agreed to edit the album Alí¡ En Vivo!, a work recorded a few years prior at the Magdalena Seijas Auditorium of the Pedagogical University Institute of Barquisimeto. The concert, in which Primera included an interpretation of the National Anthem of Venezuela ("Gloria Al Bravo Pueblo"), was made to celebrate the anniversary of a radio show of Latin American protest music.

== Discography ==
Year of publication	Title	Published by
1969	Gente De Mi Tierra	Independent
1972	De Una Vez (Canciones del Tercer Mundo – Para Un Solo Mundo)	Verlag Plane (Germany)
1973	Lo Primero de Alí Primera	Cigarrón – Promus (Venezuela)
1974	Alí Primera, Volumen 2	Cigarrón – Promus (Venezuela)
1975	Adiós en dolor Mayor	Cigarrón – Promus (Venezuela)
1976	Canción Para Los Valientes	Cigarrón – Promus (Venezuela)
1977	La Patria Es El Hombre	Cigarrón – Promus (Venezuela)
1978	Canción Mansa Para Un Pueblo Bravo	Cigarrón – Promus (Venezuela)
1979	Cuando Nombro La Poesía	Cigarrón – Promus (Venezuela)
1980	Abrebrecha	Cigarrón – Promus (Venezuela)
1981	Al Pueblo Lo Que Es De César	Cigarrón – Promus (Venezuela)
1982	Con El Sol A Medio Cielo	Cigarrón – Promus (Venezuela)
1984	Entre La Rabia Y La Ternura	Cigarrón – Promus (Venezuela)
1985	Por Si No Lo Sabía	Cigarrón – Sonográfica (Venezuela)
1986	Alí ¡En Vivo! (posthumous)	Cigarrón – Promus (Venezuela)
