= Me Volvi a Acordar de Ti =

Studio album by Los Bukis
- Released: October 21, 1986
- Recorded: July – September 1986
- Genre: Grupero
- Length: 35:21
- Label: Fonovisa

Los Bukis chronology
A Donde Vas (1985)	Me Volvi a Acordar de Ti (1986)	Si Me Recuerdas (1988)

Singles from Me Volví a Acordar de Ti
- 1. "Tú Cárcel" Released: September 15, 1986; 2. "Navidad Sin Ti" Released: December 8, 1986; 3. "Me Volví a Acordar de Ti" Released: February 16, 1987; 4. "Este Adiós" Released: May 25, 1987

Me Volvi a Acordar de Ti (I Remembered You Again) is the tenth studio album released by Los Bukis in 1986. The album entered Billboard's Latin Pop Albums chart at the end of October 1986, and peaked at number 6 on October 31 after spending four weeks on the chart. The album was certified diamond in Mexico for sales of one million copies.

Currently, this album is unavailable on streaming services in the United States.

== Track listing ==
All songs written and composed by Marco Antonio Solís

No.	Title	Length
1.	"Tu Cárcel"	3:40
2.	"El Pobre Juan"	3:08
3.	"No Me Arrepiento"	5:10
4.	"La Mujer Más Especial"	3:15
5.	"Navidad Sin Ti"	4:23
6.	"Me Volví a Acordar de Ti"	3:37
7.	"¿Dónde Estás?"	3:34
8.	"Alguien Se Quedó Llorando"	3:50
9.	"Este Adiós"	3:25
10.	"El Regreso del Alambrado"	2:41

== Charts ==
Chart (1987)	Peak position
US Latin Pop Albums (Billboard)	6

== Sales and certifications ==
Region	Certification	Certified units/sales
Mexico (AMPROFON)	Diamond	1,000,000^{^}
^{^} Shipments figures based on certification alone.
