= Inalcanzable (album) =

Studio album by Marco Antonio Solís and Los Bukis
- Released: July 1, 1993
- Recorded: February – June 1993
- Genre: Grupero
- Length: 37:08
- Label: Fonovisa

Marco Antonio Solís and Los Bukis chronology
Quiéreme (1992)	Inalcanzable (1993)	Por Amor a Mi Pueblo (1995)

Singles from Inalcanzable
- 1. "Acepto Mi Derrota" Released: May 24, 1993; 2. "Morenita" Released: Sept 13, 1993; 3. "Tu Ingratitud" Released: Nov 22, 1993; 4. "Y Yo Sin Ti" Released: January 31, 1994; 5. "A Aquella" Released: March 28, 1994; 6. "Encadenada a Mi" Released: May 30, 1994; 7. "Inalcanzable" Released: July 25, 1994

Inalcanzable (Eng.: "Unreachable") is the fifteenth studio album released by Los Bukis on July 1, 1993. The album was certified gold in the United States by the RIAA and was nominated for Pop Album of the Year at the 6th Lo Nuestro Awards. At the time of its release, the album generated controversy due to the cover showing Marco Antonio Solís' name along with Los Bukis, instead of only Los Bukis' logo

== Track listing ==
All songs written and composed by Marco Antonio Solís

No.	Title	Length
1.	"Acepto Mi Derrota"	4:10
2.	"Tiempo Para Ti"	3:15
3.	"Inalcanzable"	4:35
4.	"Morenita"	2:44
5.	"A Aquella"	3:34
6.	"Te Olvidé"	4:53
7.	"Tú Ingratitud"	3:33
8.	"Y Yo Sin Ti"	3:43
9.	"Encadenada a Mi"	3:51
10.	"Contra Viento y Marea"	2:57

== Chart performance ==
Chart (1993)	Peak position
US Billboard Top Latin Albums	3
US Billboard Latin Pop Albums	2

== Sales and certifications ==
Region	Certification	Certified units/sales
Mexico	—	1,000,000
United States (RIAA)	Gold	500,000^{^}
^{^} Shipments figures based on certification alone.
