= Los Bukis =

Mexican grupera band

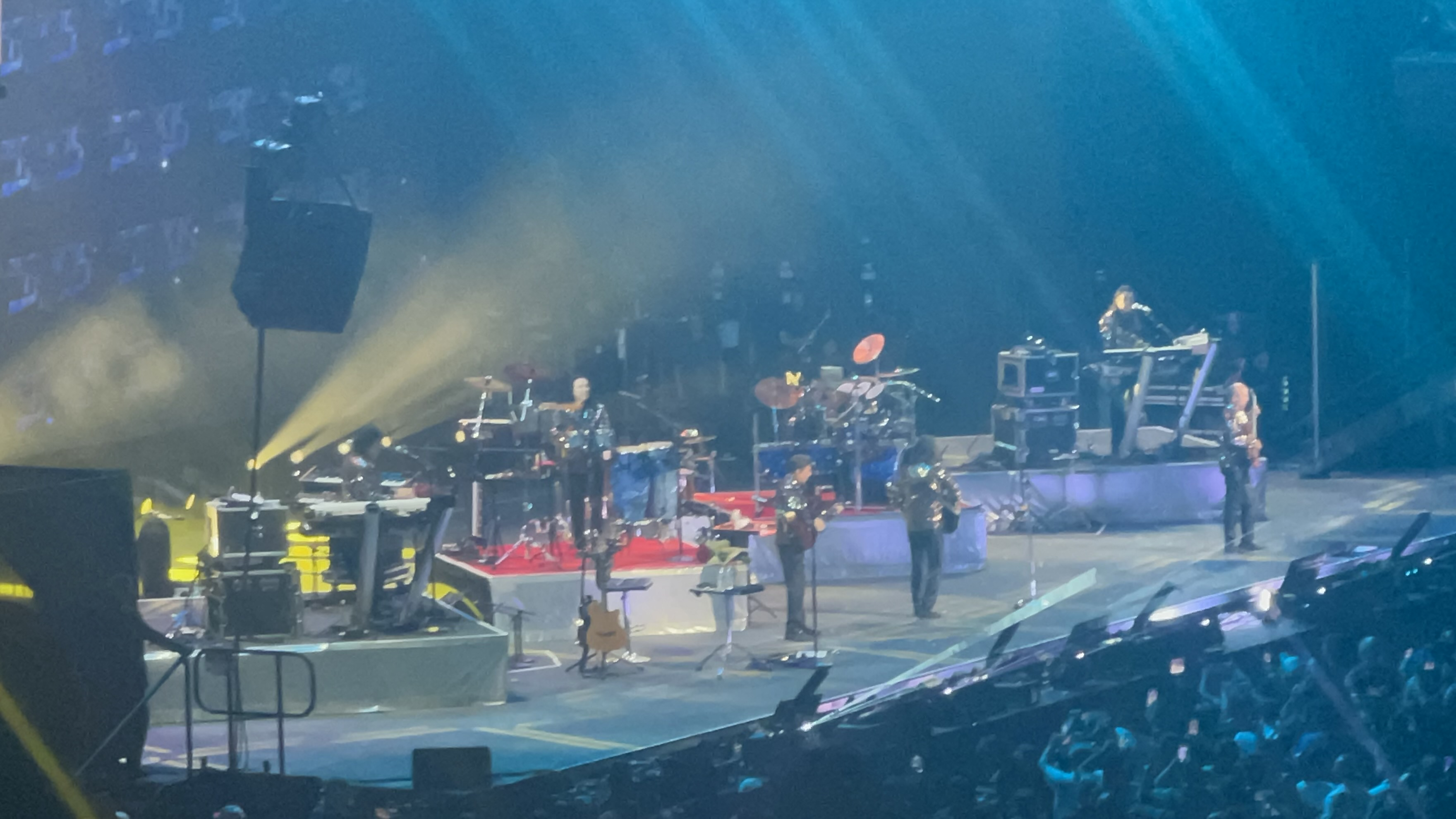
- Los Bukis performing in 2023 at the American Family Insurance Amphitheater

Background information
- Also known as: Marco Antonio Solís y Los Bukis
- Origin: Ario de Rosales, Michoacan, Mexico
- Genres: Grupero; Latin pop
- Years active: 1973–1996, 2021–2026
- Label: FONO
- Members: Marco Antonio Solís; Joel Solís; Roberto Guadarrama; Eusebio "El Chivo" Cortés; Jose "Pepe" Guadarrama; Pedro Sánchez; José Javier Solís
- Past members: Fidel Arreygue; Rodolfo "Fito" Luviano; Victor Aguilar; Carlos Hernández; Enrique "Kike" González; Jorge Dávila

Los Bukis (English: the Bukis; buki meaning "kid" in the Purépecha language) were a Mexican grupero band. Formed in Ario de Rosales, Michoacán in 1973, the band's best-known lineup consisted of Marco Antonio Solís, Joel Solís, Roberto Guadarrama, Eusebio "El Chivo" Cortés, Jose "Pepe" Guadarrama, Pedro Sánchez and José Javier Solís.

== History ==
=== 1973–1979: Formation and early releases ===
Before forming Los Bukis, musician Marco Antonio Solís was part of a duo along with his cousin Joel Solís, titled Los Hermanitos Solís (the Solís Brothers). In 1971, Marco Antonio Solís and Joel Solís would debut their first ever public appearance on television as Los Hermanitos Solís, on the popular TV show Siempre en Domingo. In 1973, the two signed in with Discos Melody where they would proposed them the name “Los Bukis” as a duet. They would release their debut studio album “Jugando Con Las Estrellas” which all of the songs are composed by Marco Antonio Solís. Sadly, their first album wasn’t able to gain recognition and success due to the lack of radio broadcasting even though copies were already made. Later, in 1974, the two would start to form Los Bukis as a four-member band along with drummer Jorge Dávila and bassist Carlos Enrique "Kike" González which during this time they would already record their next album. a year later, the band released their second studio album, Falso Amor (1975), originally titled Casas de Cartón.

The band released their third studio album, Te Tuve y Te Perdi, in 1977. In 1978, González was replaced by Eusebio "El Chivo" Córtez as the band's new bassist. Their fourth studio album, Me Siento Solo, was released in 1978, followed by Los Triunfadores in 1979.

=== 1980–1989: Commercial breakout and success ===
In 1980, Los Bukis relocated to the United States, where they added band members Roberto Guadarrama and José Javier Solís. Their sixth studio album, Me Muero Porque Seas Mi Novia, was released in 1980, with Presiento Que Voy a Llorar released the following year. In 1982, the band released their eighth studio album, Yo Te Necesito. The album was nominated for Best Mexican-American Performance at the 26th Annual Grammy Awards. In the same year, Jorge Dávila was replaced by Pedro Sánchez as the band's new drummer for 14 years. The band released their ninth studio album, Mi Fantasia, (1983). Mi Fantasia became the band's first entry on the Regional Mexican Albums chart in the United States, peaked at number 9. Their tenth studio album, A Donde Vas (1984), topped the Regional Mexican Albums chart for twenty weeks.

The band experienced large amounts of commercial success with the release of their eleventh studio album, Me Volví a Acordar de Ti (1986), which sold about 1.35 million copies and was certified diamond in Mexico. The album became their first top-ten entry on the Latin Pop Albums record chart, peaking at number 6. The album spawned the hit single "Tu Cárcel", which peaked at number 3 on the Hot Latin Songs chart and at number 2 on Radio Mil's Notitas Musicales chart in Mexico. The singles "Este Adiós" and the title track "Me Volví a Acordar de Ti" peaked at number 9 and 26 on the Hot Latin Songs, respectively.

Their twelfth studio album, Si Me Recuerdas (1987), peaked at number 6 on the Latin Pop Albums chart and became their second nomination for Best Mexican-American Performance at the 31st Annual Grammy Awards in 1989. The album spawned the singles "Tus Mentiras" and "Y Ahora Te Vas", the latter of which became the band's first number-one entry on the Hot Latin Songs chart. Their thirteenth studio album, Y Para Siempre (1989), experienced similar amounts of commercial success, selling about 750,000 copies in Mexico and peaking at number 5 on the Top Latin Albums. The album featured the number-one single "Como Fui a Enamorarme de Ti" and the number-two single "A Donde Vayas". The former was adapted into a full-length film of the same name starring Solís.

=== 1990–1996: Final albums and disbandment ===
In 1991, the band released their fourteenth studio album, A Través de Tus Ojos. The album peaked at number 4 on the Latin Pop Albums chart and was nominated for Best Latin Pop Album at the 34th Annual Grammy Awards. The single "Chiquilla Bonita" reached number 15 on the US Latin charts. Their next studio album, Quiéreme (1992), reached number 5 on the Latin Pop Albums and was the band's first entry on the Billboard Top Latin Albums, peaking at number 23. The single "Mi Mayor Necesidad" became their third song to top the US Latin charts, while the title track "Quiéreme" peaked at number 11. In 1993, the band released their fifteenth studio album, Inalcanzable, which peaked at number 2 on the Latin Pop Albums and at number 3 on the Top Latin Albums, their highest-peaking entry on both charts. The album was nominated for Pop Album of the Year at the 1994 Lo Nuestro Awards. The singles "Acepto Mi Derrota", and "Tu Ingratitúd" peaked at number 6 and 9 on the Hot Latin Songs respectively.

The band would undergo lineup changes during 1995, with three new members, Fidel Arraygue, Rodolfo "Fito" Luviano and Victor Aguilar joining as the new bassist, keyboardist and percussionist respectively. Their sixteenth and final studio album, Por Amor a Mi Pueblo (1995), sold about 600,000 copies in the United States, and peaked at number 3 on the Latin Pop Albums chart and at number 8 on the Top Latin Albums. The album spawned the hit singles "Sera Mejor Que Te Vayas" and "Una Mujer Como Tu", which peaked at number 3 and number 1 on the US Latin charts respectively. The band drew a sold-out concert in Selland Arena in May 1995, where audience members would dance instead of sit down on seats. In 1996, lead singer and songwriter Marco Antonio Solís was informed by his band members their wish to disband Los Bukis due to conflict on decision making. The remaining band members formed a new band, called Los Mismos. Marco Antonio Solís would eventually pursue a solo career.

=== 2021–2026: Reunion and tours ===
In 2021, during the COVID-19 pandemic, Marco Antonio Solís reunited Los Bukis during a livestream for the first time in 25 years. In May 2021, the band re-recorded their hit "Tu Cárcel". The band later announced a concert tour, titled Una Historia Cantada, which would span several large stadiums in the United States. The tour began at the SoFi Stadium in Inglewood, California, where the band became the first Latin artist to sell out the stadium, with about 70,000 audience members attending the concert. They later performed a sold-out concert at Soldier Field in Chicago, Illinois, before ending their 2021 tour in Oakland, California. The tour grossed about US$49.6 million, according to Billboard Boxscore.

On June 14, 2022, the band announced a second round of their Una Historia Cantada tour, which began in August 18 in Los Angeles, California, that expanded into Mexico, finishing the tour in December in Monterrey, Nuevo León. The band postponed some dates due to Eusebio "El Chivo" Cortés injuring his ankle at the Los Angeles concert. In November 2022, the band headlined the 23rd Annual Latin Grammy Awards alongside Rosalía and Carlos Vives. In August 2023, the band performed at the American Family Insurance Amphitheater in Milwaukee, Wisconsin, as part of the Summerfest music festival. After their performance in Milwaukee, Los Bukis embarked on a short tour in Central America.

On July 23, 2025, Los Bukis received the 2,817th star on the Hollywood Walk of Fame.

On October 16, 2025, Sofi Stadium announced that Los Bukis would unveil a mural alluding to the band, with the members present. The mural bears the phrase "¡Tuyos Por Siempre!" ("Yours Forever!"). Marco Antonio Solís announced that the group would perform two final concerts in February 2026; the first concert would take place at Daikin Park in Houston, Texas, on February 14, and the second concert would take place at SoFi Stadium on February 20. Due to high demand, a second concert was added to SoFi Stadium and took place on February 21.

== Members ==
- Marco Antonio Solís: Lead Vocalist, Guitar, Percussion, Keyboards (formerly), (1973–1996, 2021–2026)
- Joel Solís: Backing Vocals, Guitar (1973–1996, 2021–2026)
- Roberto Guadarrama: Keyboards, Backing Vocals, Trumpet (1980–1996, 2021–2026)
- Eusebio "El Chivo" Cortés: Bass (1978–1995, 2021–2026)
- José "Pepe" Guadarrama: Saxophone, Secondary Keyboards, Percussion (1987–1995, 2021–2026)
- Pedro Sánchez: Drums (1982–1996, 2021–2026)
- Jose Javier Solís: Congas, percussion, Keytar (1981–1987, 2021–2026)
- Jorge De Ávila: Drums (1973–1982)
- Carlos Enrique "Kike" González: Bass (1973–1976)
- Rodolfo "Fito" Luviano: Keys (1995–1996)
- Fidel Arraygue: Bass (1995–1996)
- Victor Aguilar: Percussion (1995–1996)

== Discography ==
=== Studio albums ===
- 1975: Falso Amor
- 1977: Te Tuve Y Te Perdi
- 1978: Me Siento Solo
- 1979: Los Triunfadores
- 1980: Me Muero Porque Seas Mi Novia
- 1981: Presiento Que Voy a Llorar
- 1982: Yo Te Necesito
- 1983: Mi Fantasia
- 1985: A Donde Vas
- 1986: Me Volví a Acordar de Ti
- 1988: Si Me Recuerdas
- 1989: Y Para Siempre
- 1991: A Través de Tus Ojos
- 1992: Quiéreme
- 1993: Inalcanzable
- 1995: Por Amor a Mi Pueblo

== Filmography ==
- Las Musiqueras (1983)
- La Coyota-Marco Antonio Solis (1983)
- Como Fui a Enamorame de Ti (1990)

== See also ==
- List of best-selling Latin music artists
