= Marco Antonio Solís =

Mexican musician (born 1959)

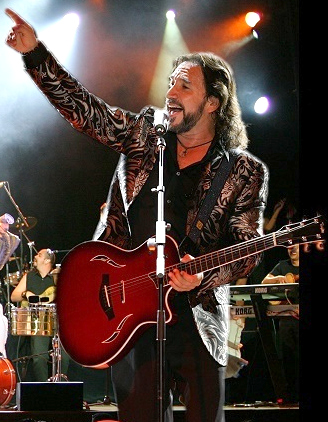
- Solís is seen in a publicity photo for his 2006 album Trozos de Mi Alma 2
- Born: Marco Antonio Solís Sosa; 29 December 1959 (age 66); Ario de Rosales, Michoacán, Mexico
- Other names: El Buki; El Buki Mayor
- Occupations: Musician; singer; songwriter; record producer; businessman
- Years active: 1976–present
- Spouses: Beatriz Adriana (m. 1983; div. 1987) Cristina Salas (m. 1993)
- Children: 4
- Musical career
- Genres: Latin pop; grupero; mariachi; cumbia; bachata
- Instruments: Vocals; guitar; percussion
- Labels: Fonovisa Records; Universal Music Latino; Habari Inc
- Formerly of: Los Bukis
- Website: marcoantoniosolis.com (in Spanish)

Marco Antonio Solís Sosa (born 29 December 1959) is a Mexican musician, singer, songwriter, and record producer. He was born in Ario de Rosales, Michoacán. Solís began his musical career at the age of six, performing with his cousin Joel Solís as Los Hermanitos Solís. In 1975, he co-founded Los Bukis, of which he was the lead vocalist, songwriter and keyboard player. The band split up after nearly two decades of success, with Solís pursuing a solo career. He released his debut solo album, En Pleno Vuelo, in 1996 on Fonovisa Records.

Solís has won five Latin Grammy Awards, two Lo Nuestro Awards, has a star on the Hollywood Walk of Fame, and is a member of the Billboard Latin Music Hall of Fame. In 2022, he was recognized as Person of the Year by the Latin Recording Academy.

== Early life and career ==
Marco Antonio Solís began performing at six as part of "Los Hermanitos Solís" with his cousin, Joel Solís, He started composing music at a young age. In the early-mid 1970s he formed Los Bukis with whom he achieved success in Mexico, Central America, South America, and the United States. As lead singer and chief songwriter of Los Bukis, Solís became known in the industry for writing and producing for popular singers including Marisela and Rocío Dúrcal. In 1995, after almost 20 years of working with the group, his group members informed him that they wanted to create a group, Los Mismos, without him. Due to internal conflicts in Los Bukis, he agreed. The event is discussed in more detail by Los Bukis members in the 2022 "El Buki" documentary available on Amazon Prime Video. That led him to pursue a solo career.

As a solo artist he has remained popular in Mexico in addition to Latin America, Spain, and the U.S. with more than 30 entries on Billboard's Hot Latin Tracks chart, including multiple number one hits. He has worked with Olga Tañón, Ana Bárbara, Enrique Iglesias, Chayanne, Marc Anthony and Anaís among others. On 5 August 2010, Solís received a star on the Hollywood Walk of Fame. He appeared as a vocal coach in the third season of La Voz... México and won the competition. He went on tour a few weeks later to promote his album Gracias Por Estar Aqui. His album, "Gracias Por Estar Aquí", was released 22 October 2013 and debuted on top of Billboard's Top Latin Albums chart.

Solís provided the Spanish-dubbing of Ernesto de la Cruz, the main antagonist of the 2017 Pixar film Coco. Solís returned to Billboard’s Regional Mexican Airplay chart for the first time in over two decades as "Se Veía Venir" reached No. 1 on the chart with a date of 2 October, 2021.

== Discography ==
=== Studio albums ===
- 1996: En Pleno Vuelo
- 1997: Marco
- 1999: Trozos de Mi Alma
- 2001: Más de Mi Alma
- 2003: Tu Amor o Tu Desprecio
- 2004: Razón de Sobra
- 2006: Trozos de Mi Alma, Vol. 2
- 2008: No Molestar
- 2010: En Total Plenitud
- 2013: Gracias Por Estar Aquí
- 2018: Mas De Mis Recuerdos

== Songs featured in telenovelas ==
- 1997: El Alma no Tiene Color – "El Alma no Tiene Color" (duet with Laura Flores)
- 1999: Girasoles Para Lucía aired in Argentina – "Si No Te Huberias Ido"
- 1999: Serafin – "Está en Tí"
- 2000: Siempre te amaré – "Sigue Sin Mí"
- 2001: Salomé – "Si No Te Hubieras Ido"
- 2001: Salomé – "Cuando Te Acuerdes de Mi"
- 2003: Velo de Novia – "Más Que Tu Amigo"
- 2006: Mundo de Fieras – "Antes de Que Te Vayas"
- 2010: Teresa – "A Dónde Vamos a Parar"
- 2013: Lo Que La Vida Me Robó – "El Perdedor" (duet with Enrique Iglesias)
- 2017: En tierras salvajes – "Estaré Contigo"

== Awards and nominations ==
=== Grammy Awards ===
Year	Nominated Work	Category	Result	Ref.
1984	"Yo Te Necesito"	Best Mexican-American Performance	Nominated	
1989	"Si Me Recuerdas"	Best Mexican-American Performance	Nominated	
1992	A Traves De Tus Ojos	Best Latin Pop Album	Nominated	
1997	En Pleno Vuelo	Best Latin Pop Performance	Nominated	
1997	Trozos De Mi Alma 2	Best Latin Pop Album	Nominated	
1997	Gracias Por Estar Aquí	Best Latin Pop Album	Nominated	
2023	Qué Ganas de Verte	Best Música Mexicana Album (including Tejano)	Nominated	

=== Latin Grammy Awards ===
Year	Nominated Work	Category	Result	Ref.
2002	Más de Mi Alma	Best Male Pop Vocal Album	Nominated	
2004	"Tu Amor o Tu Desprecio"	Best Regional Mexican Song	Won	
2005	Razón de Sobra	Best Male Pop Vocal Album	Nominated	
2009	"No Molestar"	Best Regional Mexican Song	Won	
2009	No Molestar	Best Grupero Album	Won	
2011	"Tú Me Vuelves Loco"	Best Regional Mexican Song	Won	
2011	En Total Plenitud	Best Male Pop Vocal Album	Nominated	
2011	"A Dónde Vamos a Parar"	Song of the Year	Nominated	
2014	"De Mil Amores"	Best Regional Mexican Song	Won	
2015	"La Vida Entera" (with Camila)	Record of the Year	Nominated	
2022	Qué Ganas De Verte	Best Ranchero/Mariachi Album	Nominated	
2026	"Coleccionando Heridas" (with Karol G)	Record of the Year	Pending	

=== Billboard Latin Music Awards ===
Year	Nominee / work	Award	Result
1996	Marco Antonio Solís	Songwriter of the Year	Won
1996	Marco Antonio Solís	Producer of the Year	Won
1997	Marco Antonio Solís	Songwriter of the Year	Won
1997	Marco Antonio Solís	Producer of the Year	Won
1998	Marco Antonio Solís	Songwriter of the Year	Won
2000	Marco Antonio Solís	Hot Latin Tracks Artist of the Year	Nominated
2000	Marco Antonio Solís	Songwriter of the Year	Won
2000	"Si Te Pudiera Mentir"	Hot Latin Track of the Year	Nominated
2002	Marco Antonio Solís	Hot Latin Tracks Artist of the Year	Nominated
2002	Marco Antonio Solís	Songwriter of the Year	Nominated
2002	"O Me Voy O Te Vas"	Hot Latin Track of the Year	Nominated
2004	Marco Antonio Solís	Songwriter of the Year	Nominated
2005	Marco Antonio Solís	Hot Latin Tracks Artist of the Year	Nominated
2005	Marco Antonio Solís	Songwriter of the Year	Nominated
2005	Marco Antonio Solís	Lifetime Achievement Award	Won
2005	"Más Que Tu Amigo"	Hot Latin Track of the Year	Nominated
2007	Marco Antonio Solís	Songwriter of the Year	Nominated
2008	Marco Antonio Solís	Songwriter of the Year	Won
2008	Marco Antonio Solís	Producer of the Year	Nominated
2009	Marco Antonio Solís	Songwriter of the Year	Nominated
2016	Marco Antonio Solís	Lifetime Achievement Award	Won
2026	"Coleccionando Heridas" (with Karol G)	Latin Pop Song of the Year	Won
2026	"Coleccionando Heridas" (with Karol G)	Airplay Song of the Year	Nominated

==== Billboard Latin Music Hall of Fame ====
Year	Nominee / work	Award	Result
2000	Marco Antonio Solís	Billboard Latin Music Hall of Fame	Inducted

==== Heat Latin Music Awards ====
Year	Nominee / work	Award	Result
2026	"Coleccionando Heridas" (with Karol G)	Song of the Year	Pending
2026	"Coleccionando Heridas" (with Karol G)	Best Collaboration	Pending

=== Latin American Music Awards ===
The Latin American Music Awards are the Spanish-language version of the American Music Awards hosted on U.S. Spanish-language television network, Telemundo.

Year	Nominee / work	Award	Result
2015	Marco Antonio Solís	Favorite Male Artist – Pop/Rock	Nominated

=== Lo Nuestro Awards ===
The Lo Nuestro Awards are awarded annually by Univision in the United States. Solís won twice twice and has 13 nominations.

Year	Nominee / work	Award	Result
1994	Inalcanzable	Pop Album of the Year	Nominated
1996	Por Amor a Mi Pueblo	Pop Album of the Year	Nominated
1996	Himself	Excellence Award	Won
1997	Himself	Pop Male Artist of the Year	Nominated
1997	En Pleno Vuelo	Pop Album of the Year	Nominated
2002	Pop Male Artist of the Year	Pop Album of the Year	Nominated
2002	Más de Mi Alma	Pop Album of the Year	Nominated
2002	"O Me Voy o Te Vas"	Pop Song of the Year	Nominated
2014	Himself	Pop Male Artist of the Year	Won
2015	Himself	Pop Male Artist of the Year	Nominated
2015	Gracias Por Estar Aquí	Pop Album of the Year	Nominated
2015	"El Perdedor"	Pop Song of the Year	Nominated
2015	"Tres Semanas"	Pop Song of the Year	Nominated
2017	Himself	Pop Male Artist of the Year	Nominated
2020	Y La Historia Continúa Tour	Tour of the Year	Nominated
2026	Himself	Pop Male Artist of the Year	Nominated
2026	"Coleccionando Heridas" (with Karol G)	The Perfect Mix of the Year	Nominated
2026	Más Cerca De Ti Tour	Tour of the Year	Nominated

^{^[I]} Each year has a link to the article about the Lo Nuestro Awards held in the particular year.

== See also ==
- List of best-selling Latin music artists
