= No Que No... =

- No Que No... CD cover

Studio album by Pedro Fernández
- Released: May 2012
- Recorded: 2012
- Genre: Mariachi, banda, cumbia
- Length: 45:00
- Language: Spanish
- Label: EMI/Capitol Latin/Universal Music Latin Entertainment
- Director: Jorge Avedaño
- Producer: Pedro Fernández and Manuel Calderón

Pedro Fernández chronology
Hasta Que el Dinero Nos Separe (2010)	No Que No... (2012)	Hasta el Fin del Mundo (2014)

No Que No... (idiom: "I told you so...") is an album by Mexican recording artist Pedro Fernández, released by EMI/Capitol Latin May 2012.

This album was nominated for the Latin Grammy Award for Best Ranchero/Mariachi Album for the 13th Annual Latin Grammy Awards in 2012 where Pedro also performed the title song, "No Que No...".

== Background ==
The album was produced by Pedro Fernández with Manuel Calderón and coordinated by Jorge Avendaño, who has worked with artists such as Placido Domingo, Edith Márquez, Ana Gabriel, and Lucero, among many others. This album has the participation of great arrangers like Eduardo Magallanes, Fernando de Santiago and Aneiro Taño.

The title 'No Que No' comes from the song authored by Rigo Tovar, who was a popular idol in Mexico. Fernández explains, "Saying 'no que no' is a way of demonstrating that you can do things. The song speaks of a 'no que no' more inclined to romance: 'Not that you were not going to cry for me', 'not that you would not miss my kisses'. It is cumbia, rhythmic, light and funny."

Fernández has stated, "The album is very interesting, from the point of view of musical balance. We have romantic, joyful and funny songs; There are classics like Guantanamera, El jinete (The rider) and Ahí nos vemos, cocodrilo (See you later, alligator). Among the songs known, that are covers, we also have very interesting unpublished songs, like Santito, Lluvia de medianoche (Midnight Rain) and Ya no te vayas (Don't go away already); In short, I hope the public likes it and the repertoire is very attractive."

== Songs ==
The first single from the album was "Lluvia", a song made in the 1980s by the singer-songwriter Luis Ángel. Pedro notes, "I love the song. For me it will always be a pleasure to return to songs that unite the current generation with the generation that first met this theme", which in addition to playing on radio in Mexico and Colombia it was also launched in the United States.

The album also brings a song (Midnight Rain) composed by his daughter Karina. "What I would most like is that people accept it well, that they like how Karina writes and that very soon we can hear songs of hers performed by other singers", said Fernández.

== Special edition ==
A special edition of the album was later released and includes the theme song "Cachito de Cielo" (Little bit of Heaven) for the new telenovela by the same name (Cachito de cielo telenovela) which starred Pedro as the main protagonist. "Cachito de Cielo" is written, arranged and performed by Pedro Fernández, is a song that Pedro wrote while reading and thinking about the plot of the novel, which has been very successful and accepted by the public.

The album also contains three bonus tracks: "La Gorda", "Lluvia" Banda version and "Pruébame". The album was produced by Pedro Fernández with Manuel Calderón and coordinated by Jorge Avendaño.

"No Que No" was first issued through EMI Music and the singles from that release, "Lluvia" and "No Que No", both advanced to the top of the radio at the national level.

When "Cachito de Cielo" was released as a single, after the release of the album's special edition, Fernández was nominated and won the Latin Grammy Award for Best Regional Mexican Song (2013) as songwriter and performing artist for "Cachito de Cielo". This marked his third Latin Grammy Award.

== Track listing ==
No.	Title	Writer(s)	Length
1.	"Lluvia"	Luis Angel	4:08
2.	"El Jinete"	José Alfredo Jiménez	3:10
3.	"Santito"	Eduardo Fuentes, Aníbal Murat	3:46
4.	"No Que No"	Rigo Tovar	2:52
5.	"Amor De A De Veras"	Gerardo Flores, Fernando Riba	4:05
6.	"Guantanamera"	José Fernández Díaz	4:02
7.	"Perdóname Mi Amor Por Ser Tan Guapo"	Rigo Tovar, Hector Meneses	3:08
8.	"El Mariachi Loco"	Roman Palomar Arreola	2:40
9.	"La Voy A Matar"	Nelson Ned, D. Pintos	4:34
10.	"Tu Loco Enamorado"	Daniel Jiménez Jiménez	2:47
11.	"Ya No Te Vayas"	Pedro Fernández	3:41
12.	"Lluvia De Media Noche"	Karina Cuevas	3:37
13.	"Ahí Nos Vemos Cocodrilo"	Robert Charles Guidry	2:30

Special edition
No.	Title	Writer(s)	Length
1.	"Lluvia"	Luis Angel	4:08
2.	"El Jinete"	José Alfredo Jiménez	3:10
3.	"Santito"	Eduardo Fuentes, Aníbal Murat	3:46
4.	"No Que No"	Rigo Tovar	2:52
5.	"Amor De A De Veras"	Gerardo Flores, Fernando Riba	4:05
6.	"Guantanamera"	José Fernández Díaz	4:02
7.	"Perdóname Mi Amor Por Ser Tan Guapo"	Riga Tovar, Hector Meneses	3:08
8.	"El Mariachi Loco"	Roman Palomar Arreola	2:40
9.	"La Voy A Matar"	Nelson Ned, D. Pintos	4:34
10.	"Tu Loco Enamorado"	Daniel Jiménez Jiménez	2:47
11.	"Ya No Te Vayas"	Pedro Fernández	3:41
12.	"La Gorda"	Israel Bustamante Valencia	3:03
13.	"Lluvia De Media Noche"	Karina Cuevas	3:37
14.	"Lluvia" (Versión Banda)	Luis Angel	4:10
15.	"Pruébame"	Nelson Ned	4:07
16.	"Ahí Nos Vemos Cocodrilo"	Robert Charles Guidry	2:32
17.	"Cachito De Cielo"	Pedro Fernández	3:20
