= Artistic swimming at the 2022 South American Games – Duet routine =

Duet routine at the 2022 South American Games
- Venue: Centro Acuático Nacional
- Location: Asunción, Paraguay
- Dates: 7 October 2022 (preliminary); 8 October 2022 (final)
- Competitors: 14 from 7 nations
- Teams: 7
- Winning points: 158.5894

Medalists
gold medal	Jullia Soares; Laura Miccuci	Brazil
silver medal	Estefanía Roa; Melisa Ceballos	Colombia
bronze medal	Soledad García; Trinidad García	Chile

The Duet routine competition at the 2022 South American Games was held on 7 and 8 October 2022.

== Results ==
The Technical Routine was started on 7 October. The Free Routine was held on 8 October.

Rank	Nation	Swimmers	Total		Technical Routine		Free Routine	
Rank	Nation	Swimmers	Points	Rank	Points	Rank	Points	Rank
1st place, gold medalist(s)	Brazil	Jullia Soares; Laura Miccuci	158.5894	1	77.9227	1	80.6667	1
2nd place, silver medalist(s)	Colombia	Estefanía Roa; Melisa Ceballos	154.9484	2	75.7817	2	79.1667	2
3rd place, bronze medalist(s)	Chile	Soledad García; Trinidad García	151.2995	3	73.7662	3	77.5333	3
4	Argentina	Camila Pineda; Luisina Caussi	147.1990	4	72.2990	4	74.9000	4
5	Uruguay	Agustina Medina; Clara De León	146.2301	5	72.1301	5	74.1000	5
6	Peru	Camila Fernández; María José Ccoyllo	141.3571	6	69.4904	6	71.8667	6
7	Venezuela	Albany Avila; Melissa Ceballos	139.4210	7	67.8210	7	71.6000	7
