= Latin Grammy Award for Best Ranchero/Mariachi Album =

Award presented annually to Ranchero music albums

- Awarded for: quality albums of the mariachi genre
- Country: United States
- Presented by: The Latin Recording Academy
- First award: 2000
- Currently held by: Camila Fernández for La Fernández (2026)

Highlights
- Most awards: Vicente Fernández (9)
- Most nominations: Pepe Aguilar (14)
- Website: latingrammy.com

The Latin Grammy Award for Best Ranchero/Mariachi Album was an honor presented annually at the Latin Grammy Awards, a ceremony that recognizes excellence and creates a wider awareness of cultural diversity and contributions of Latin recording artists in the United States and internationally. The award went to solo artists, duos, or groups for releasing vocal or instrumental albums containing at least 51% of new recordings in the ranchero music genre.

Vicente Fernández is the most awarded performer in this category, having won eight times, including once for three consecutive years from 2002 to 2004 and once for four consecutive years from 2008 to 2011. He is also the most nominated artist in the category with fifteen nominations. Pepe Aguilar and Christian Nodal are tied for the second most-awarded performers with four wins each.

The award has been presented mostly by artists originating from Mexico on all but three occasions. In 2005, when it was awarded to Puerto Rican singer Luis Miguel, who happens to reside in Mexico, 2005 for the album México En La Piel and the following two years to an American singer of Mexican origin, Pepe Aguilar.

In 2016, the award was not awarded due to a lack of entries. All-female band Flor de Toloache won the award in 2017, becoming the first female recipient of the award as well as the first band to win.

== Winners and nominees ==
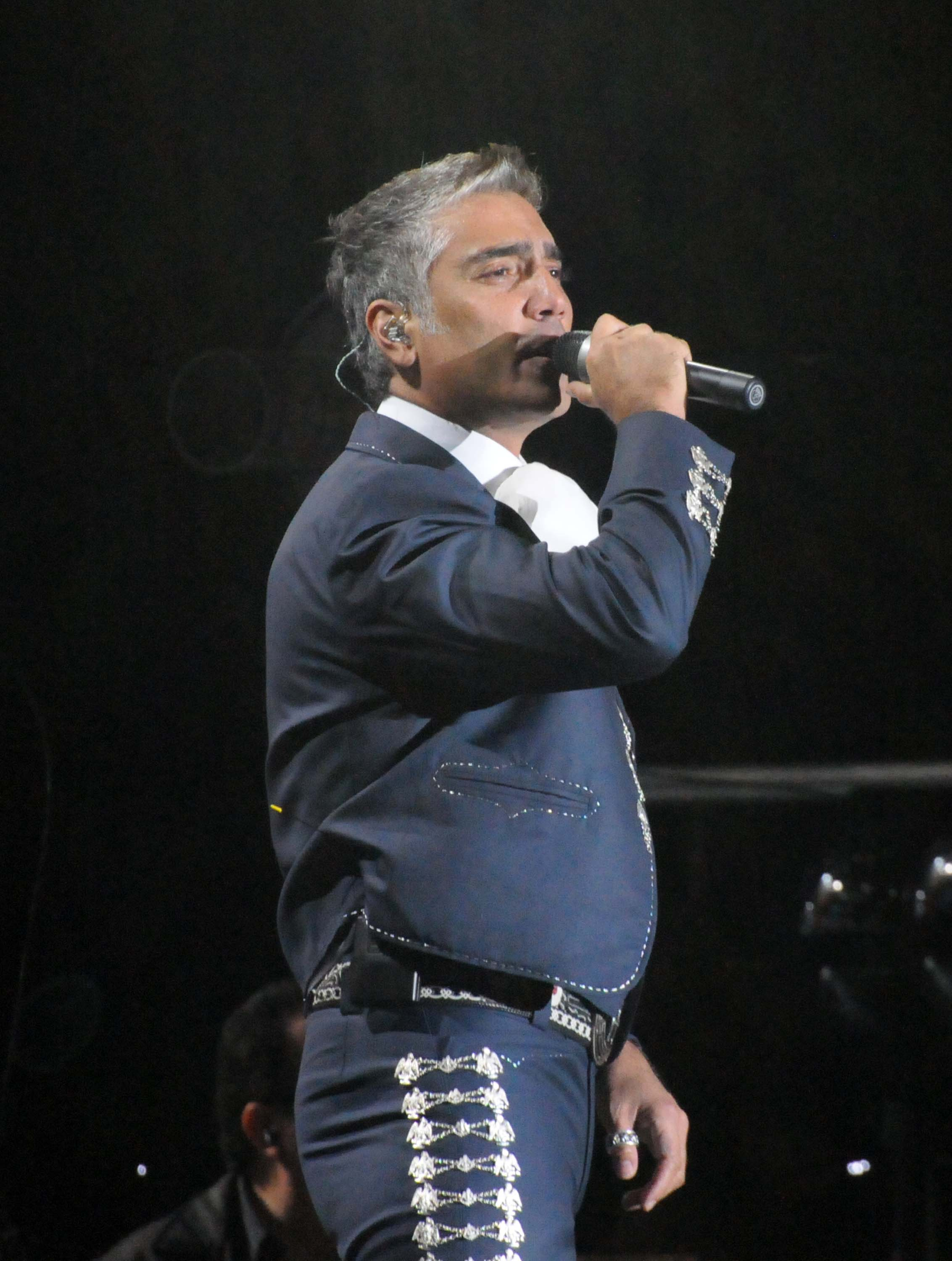
Alejandro Fernández was the first recipient of the award. He has won the award four times, including one with his father Vicente Fernández.

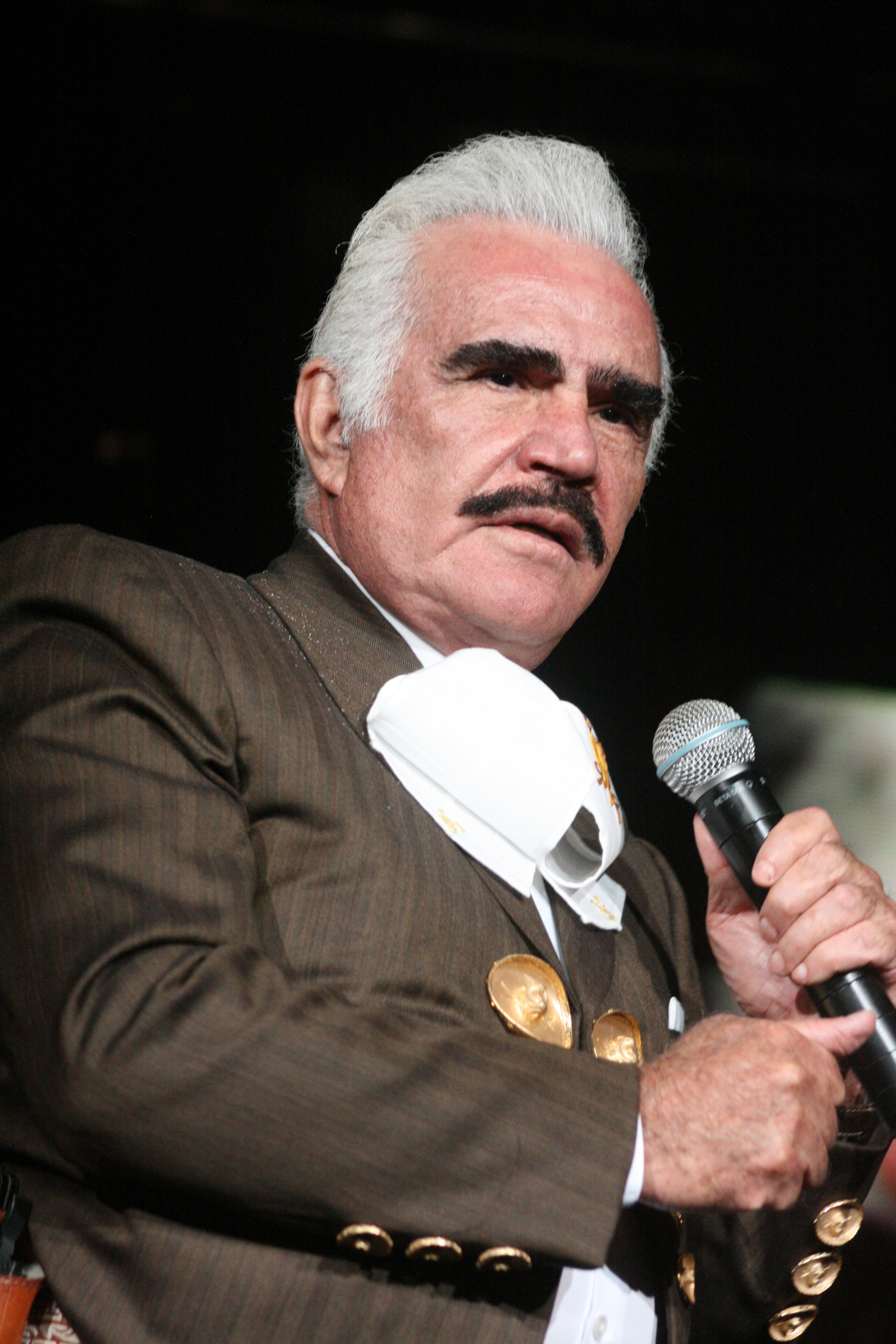
Vicente Fernández the most awarded performer in this category with nine wins, including a win with his son Alejandro Fernández. Vicente is also the most nominated artists with fifteen nominations.

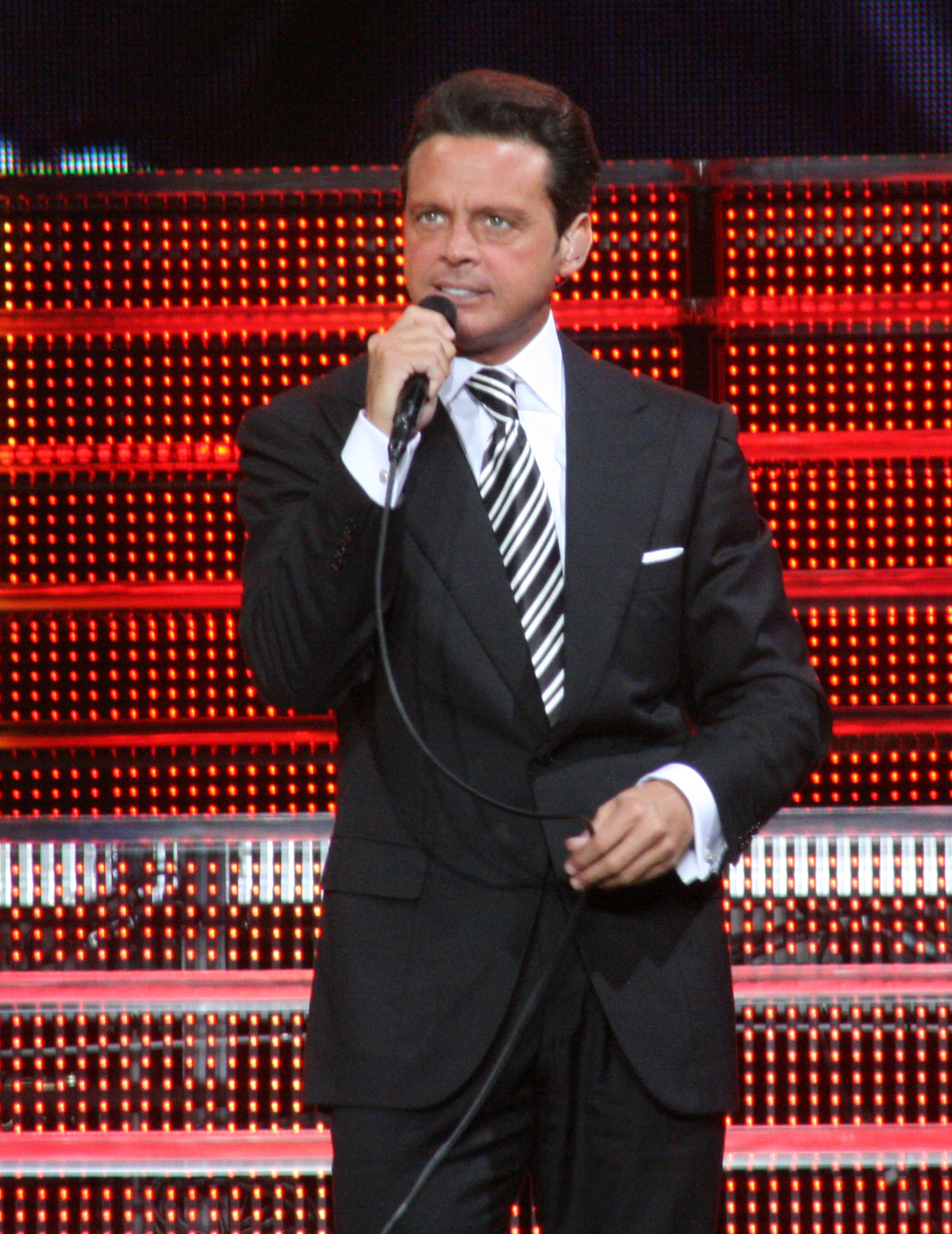
Two-time winner Luis Miguel. His second win was for ¡México Por Siempre!, which also won Album of the Year.

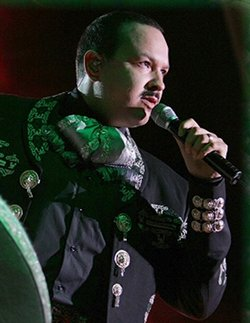
Mexican-American singer Pepe Aguilar winner in 2006, 2007, 2012, and 2014.

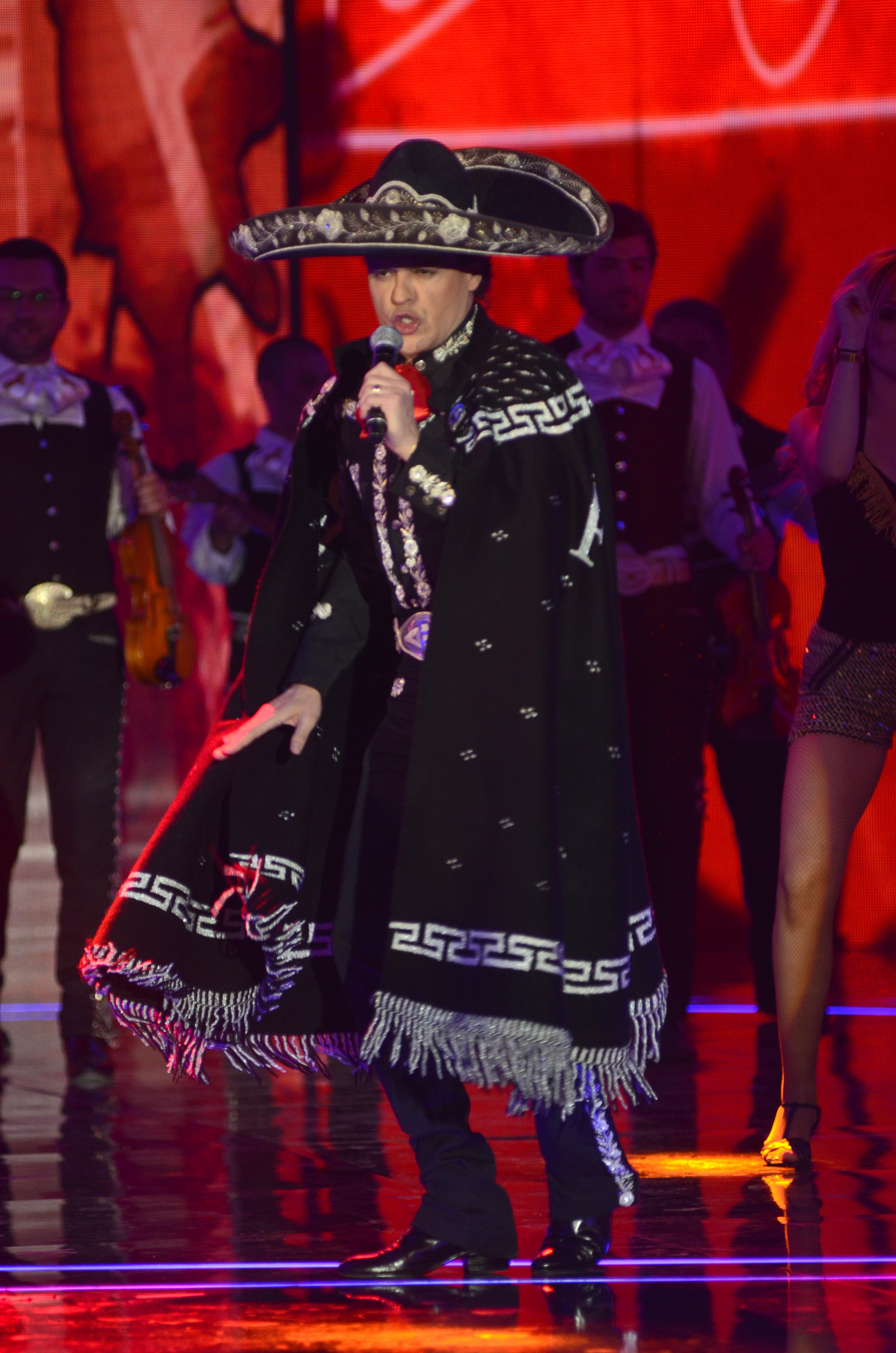
Pedro Fernández winner in 2001 and 2015.

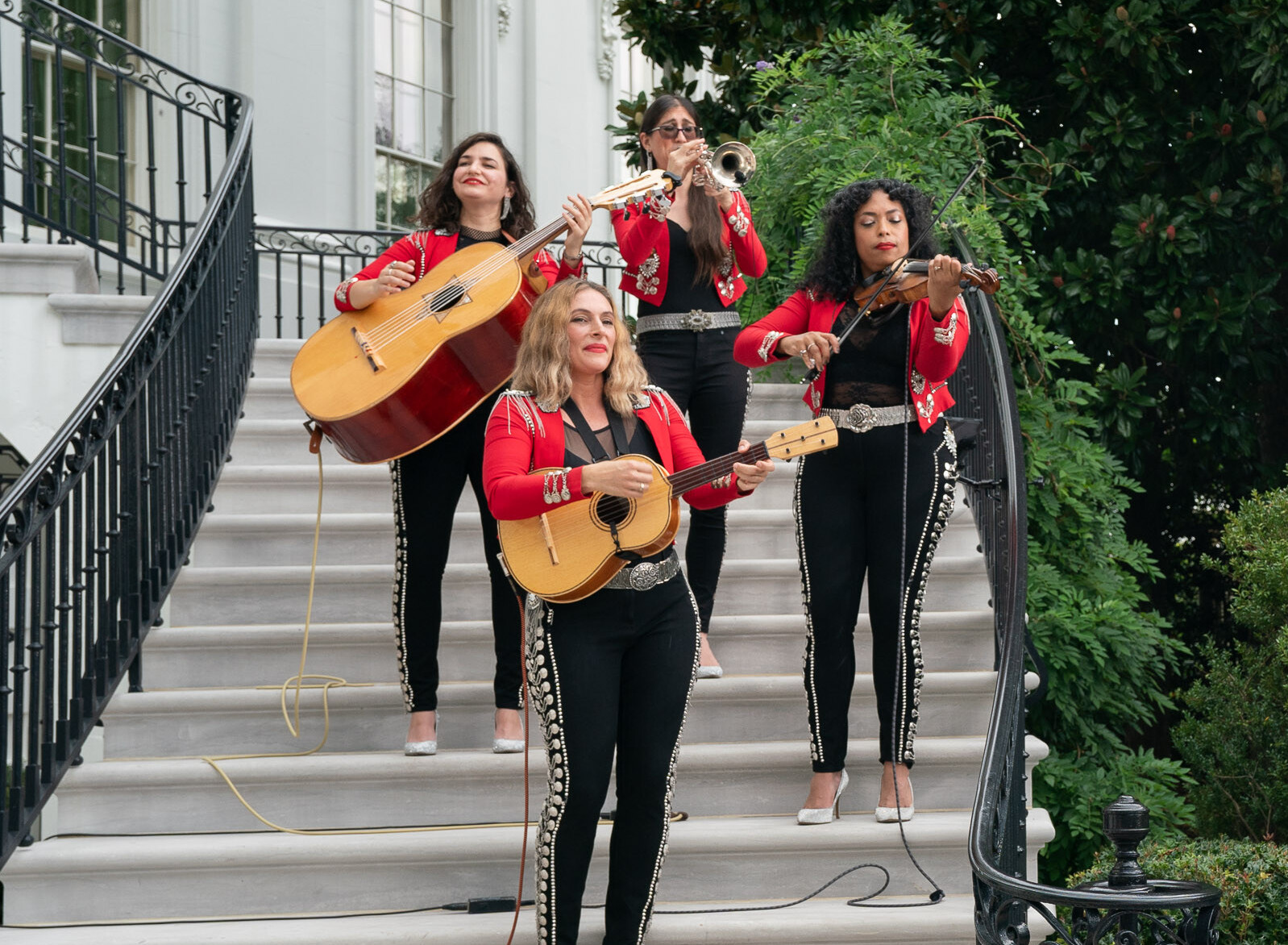
2017 winners Flor de Toloache, the first female recipients of the award as well as the first band to win.

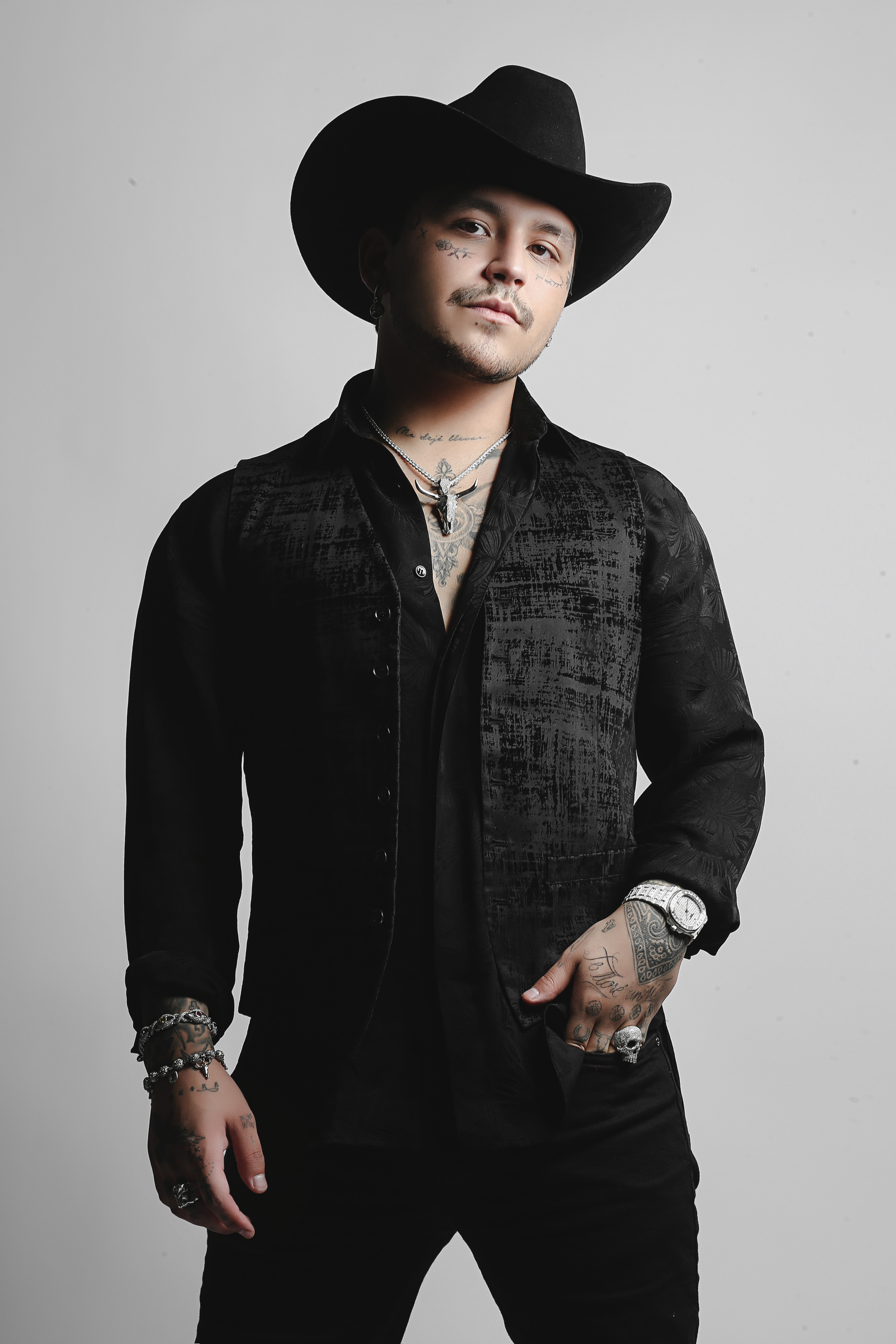
Four-time winner Christian Nodal.

Year^{[I]}	Performing artist(s)	Work	Nominees^{[II]}	Ref.
2000	Alejandro Fernández	Mi Verdad	Antonio Aguilar – Consentida; Pepe Aguilar – Por Mujeres Como Tú; Vicente Fernández – Vicente Fernández y Los Más Grandes Éxitos de Los Dandy's; Nydia Rojas – Si Me Conocieras	
2001	Pedro Fernández	Yo No Fuí	Paquita la del Barrio – Piérdeme El Respeto; Mariachi Sol de México – Tequila con Limón con El Mariachi; Myrza – Homenaje a Fernando Z. Maldonado; Manuel Vargas – Por Amor	
2002	Vicente Fernández	Más Con El Número Uno	Pepe Aguilar – Lo Mejor de Nosotros; Ana Bárbara – Te Regalo La Lluvia; Aida Cuevas – Enhorabuena; Alejandro Fernández – Orígenes	
2003	Vicente Fernández	35 Aniversario – Lo Mejor de Lara	Pepe Aguilar – Y Tenerte Otra Vez; Rocío Dúrcal – Rocío Dúrcal... En Concierto Inólvidable; Alejandro Fernández – Niña Amada Mía; Pedro Fernández – De Corazón	
2004	Vicente Fernández and Alejandro Fernández	En Vivo: Juntos Por Ultima Vez	Pepe Aguilar – Con Orgullo Por Herencia; Vicente Fernández – Se Me Hizo Tarde la Vida; Pablo Montero – Gracias… Homenaje A Javier Solis; Marco Antonio Solís – Tu Amor o Tu Desprecio	
2005	Luis Miguel	México En La Piel	Pepe Aguilar – No Soy de Nadie; Rocío Dúrcal – Alma Ranchera; Vicente Fernández – Vicente Fernández y Sus Corridos Consentidos; Ana Gabriel – Tradicional	
2006	Pepe Aguilar	Historias de Mi Tierra	Ana Gabriel – Dos amores un amante; Pablo Montero – A Toda Ley; Lupillo Rivera – El Rey de las Cantinas; Alicia Villarreal – Orgullo de Mujer	
2007	Pepe Aguilar	Enamorado	Cristian Castro – El Indomable; Pedro Fernández – Escúchame; Vicente Fernández – La Tragedia del Vaquero; Pablo Montero – Qué Bonita es Mi Tierra... y sus Canciones	
2008	Vicente Fernández	Para Siempre	Pepe Aguilar – 100% Mexicano; Pedro Fernández – Dime Mi Amor; Los Temerarios – Recuerdos del Alma; Jenni Rivera – ¡La Diva En Vivo!	
2009	Vicente Fernández	Primera Fila	Shaila Dúrcal – Corazón Ranchero; José Feliciano – Con México En El Corazón; Mariachi Reyna De Los Angeles – Compañeras; Diego Verdaguer – Mexicano Hasta Las Pampas	
2010	Vicente Fernández	Necesito de tí	Alejandro Fernández – Dos Mundos; Pedro Fernández – Amarte a la Antigua; Juan Gabriel – Juan Gabriel; Jenni Rivera – La Gran Señora	
2011	Vicente Fernández	El Hombre Que Mas Te Amó	Pepe Aguilar – Bicentenario 1810 / 1910 / 2010; Lucía Méndez – Canta Un Homenaje A Juan Gabriel; Paquita la del Barrio – Eres Un Farsante; Joan Sebastián – Huevos Rancheros	
2012	Pepe Aguilar	Más de Un Camino	Shaila Dúrcal – Así; Pedro Fernández – No Que No; Miguel y Miguel – Aquí en el Rancho; Trio Ellas – Trio Ellas	
2013	Vicente Fernández	Hoy	Vikki Carr – Viva la Vida; Aida Cuevas – Totalmente Juan Gabriel; Mariachi Sol de México de José Hernández con La Sinfónica de Las Américas – La Música; Sheyla – Amémonos: Homenaje a Lucha Villa	
2014	Pepe Aguilar	Lástima Que Sean Ajenas	Oscar Cruz – ¿Quien Dice Que No?; Vicente Fernández – Mano a Mano: Tangos a La Manera de Vicente Fernández; Olivia Gorra – Bésame Mucho España; Juan Montalvo – Mujeres Divinas	
2015	Pedro Fernández	Acaríciame El Corazón	Aida Cuevas – Pa' Que Sientas Lo Que Siento; Mariachi Flor de Toloache – Mariachi Flor de Toloache; Mariachi Los Arrieros Del Valle – Alegría Del Mariachi; Diego Verdaguer – Mexicano Hasta Las Pampas 2	
2016	Not awarded			
2017	Mariachi Flor de Toloache	Las Caras Lindas	Majida Issa – Pero No Llorando - Nocturna; Mariachi Herencia De México – Nuestra Herencia; Mariachi Imperial Azteca – Aún Estoy De Pie; Mariachi Oro De América – 36 Aniversario Mariachi Oro De América	
2018	Luis Miguel	¡México Por Siempre!	Ángela Aguilar – Primero Soy Mexicana; Tania Libertad – Jose Alfredo y Yo; Mariachi Sol de México de José Hernández - Leyendas de Mi Pueblo; Christian Nodal – Me Dejé Llevar	
2019	Christian Nodal	Ahora	El Bebeto – Mi Persona Preferida; Álex Fernández – Sigue La Dinastía...; Vicente Fernández - Más Romántico Que Nunca; Flor de Toloache – Indestructible	
2020	Alejandro Fernández	Hecho en México	Aida Cuevas – Antología de la Música Ranchera; Eugenia León - A Los 4 Vientos Vol. 1 "Ranchero"; Mariachi Sol De Mexico De José Hernández – Bailando Sones y Huanpangos con el Mariachi Sol de México de José Hernández; Christian Nodal – AYAYAY!	
2021	Vicente Fernández	A Mis 80's	El Bebeto – Cuanto te Enamores; Nora González – #CHARRAMILLENNIAL - LADY; Christian Nodal – AYAYAY! (Súper Deluxe); Pike Romero – Soy México	
2022	Christian Nodal	EP #1 Forajido	Ángela Aguilar – Mexicana Enamorada; Majo Aguilar – Mi Herencia, Mi Sangre; Mariachi Sol de Mexico de José Hernández – Mariachi Sol de Mexico de José Hernández; Marco Antonio Solís – Qué Ganas de Verte (Deluxe)	
2023	Christian Nodal	Forajido EP2	Majo Aguilar – Se Canta con el Corazón (Deluxe); Ana Bárbara – Bordado a Mano; Adriel Favela – Sólo Muere Si Se Olvida; Mariachi Herencia de México – Herederos	
2024	Alejandro Fernández	Te Llevo en la Sangre	Majo Aguilar – Mariachi y Tequila (Deluxe); Pepe Aguilar – Que Llueva Tequila; Mariachi Sol de México de José Hernández – Romances Eternos	
2025	Christian Nodal	¿Quién + Como Yo?	Pepe Aguilar – Mi Suerte es Ser Mexicano; Mariachi Reyna de Los Ángeles – Alma de Reyna 30 Aniversario	
2026	Camila Fernández	La Fernández	Pepe Aguilar – Mi Suerte es Ser Mexicano II; Mariachi Sol de México de José Hernández – La Voz de Mi Trompeta (50 Años); Christian Nodal – Bandera Blanca	

^{^[I]} Each year is linked to the article about the Latin Grammy Awards held that year.

== See also ==
- Latin Grammy Award for Best Regional Song
