= Mi Forma de Sentir (song) =

1978 song by La Revolución de Emiliano Zapata

Song by La Revolución de Emiliano Zapata

from the album La Revolución de Emiliano Zapata
- Released: 1979
- Length: 3:51
- Label: Discos Melody
- Songwriter(s): Javier Martín del Campo

"Mi Forma de Sentir" ("My Way of Feeling") is a song by La Revolución de Emiliano Zapata and written by the band's front man Javier Martín del Campo from their 1979 album of the same name.

== Cover versions ==
"Mi Forma de Sentir"

Single by Pedro Fernández

from the album Mi Forma De Sentir
- Released: 1994
- Genre: Ranchera
- Length: 4:05
- Label: PolyGram Latino
- Songwriter(s): Javier Martín del Campo
- Producer(s): Mariana Somonte

Pedro Fernández singles chronology
"Besos de Plata" (1994)	"Mi Forma de Sentir" (1994)	"Si Te Vas" (1995)

In 1994, Mexican singer Pedro Fernández covered the song on his 1994 album of the same name. His version peaked at #6 on the Hot Latin Songs chart and #10 on the Regional Mexican Airplay chart. A year later, Puerto Rican salsa singer Giro also covered "Mi Forma de Sentir" on his album Loco Corazón (1995). Giro's version reached #1 on the Tropical Airplay chart where it spent two week at the spot. On the 1996 year-end charts, it ranked at #14 on the Tropical Airplay charts.

== Charts ==
=== Weekly charts ===
Pedro Fernández's version
Chart (1994)	Peak position
US Hot Latin Songs (Billboard)	6
US Regional Mexican Airplay (Billboard)	10

=== Year-end charts ===
1995 year-end for Pedro Fernández's version
Chart (1995)	Position
US Hot Latin Songs (Billboard)	8

== See also ==
- Billboard Hot Latin Songs Year-End Chart
- List of Billboard Tropical Airplay number ones of 1996
