= Hasta el fin del mundo (album) =

Hasta el Fin del Mundo
- Hasta el Fin del Mundo album cover

Studio album by Pedro Fernández
- Released: November 10, 2014
- Recorded: 2014
- Genre: Latin pop, Banda, Mariachi, Ranchera, Latin ballad
- Language: Spanish
- Label: Fonovisa
- Director: Jorge Avendaño
- Producer: Pedro Fernández

Pedro Fernández chronology
No Que No... edición especial (2012)	Hasta el Fin del Mundo (2014)	Acaríciame El Corazón (2015)

Hasta el Fin del Mundo (Until the end of the world) is an album by Mexican recording artist Pedro Fernández, released by Fonovisa Records on November 10, 2014.

Pedro Fernández titled this album "Hasta el Fin del Mundo" even though he is no longer on the telenovela of the same name Hasta el fin del mundo for which he wrote the titled theme song.

Fernández said, at the time of the release, that it was his most personal album. "In this album we looked for balance", he said. "We wanted romantic songs and also rhythmic variations that would make the audience listen to the entire album." The singer said he took a risk because it has a very personal touch. His album shows people how he feels.

"It is a disc full of illusions and hopes, plus it is very important to me because it is the first disc that I have produced myself, previous albums were co-productions. It motivates me see the completed project that was born from many months in the making", declared the winner of the Latin Grammy.

Of the 13 songs on this album, Pedro Fernández composed 5 of them, including the title song, and is the album's producer.

== Track listing ==
No.	Title	Composer(s)	Length
1.	"Hasta el Fin del Mundo"	Pedro Fernández	3:34
2.	"Si Tuviera Que Decirlo"	Pedro Fernández	4:13
3.	"Debajo Del Sombrero"	Manuel Contero	3:11
4.	"Se Me Perdió La Cadenita"	Luis Guillermo Perez Cedron	2:59
5.	"Acaríciame El Corazón"	Pedro Fernández	4:18
6.	"Duele Ver"	Jerry Demara	3:35
7.	"El Facilito"	Joss Favela, Luciano Luna	2:36
8.	"Para Perdernos"	Ariel Barreras	3:31
9.	"Hoy En Esta Noche"	Pedro Fernández	3:35
10.	"El Tao Tao"	Luis Guillermo Perez Cedron	2:33
11.	"Ciegamente Enamorado"	Claudia Brant, Ramiro Terán	3:57
12.	"Feliz Navidad Amor"	Pedro Fernández	3:10
13.	"Duele Ver" (Banda Version)	Jerry Demara	3:34
Total length:			44:46

== Charts ==
Chart (2014)	Peak position
US Top Latin Albums (Billboard)	32
US Regional Mexican Albums (Billboard)	15
