= La de la Mochila Azul =

- La de la Mochila Azul album cover

Studio album by Pedrito Fernández
- Released: August 20, 1978
- Recorded: 1978
- Genre: Ranchera, Mariachi, Folk, Latin ballad, Latin pop
- Length: 28:25
- Language: Spanish
- Label: Epic Records, CBS Records International, Columbia Records
- Director: Pedro Ramirez

Pedrito Fernández chronology
La de la Mochila Azul (1978)	Mamá Solita (1979)

La de la Mochila Azul (The girl with the blue backpack) is the debut studio album by Mexican recording artist Pedrito Fernández, (Pedro) released in 1978 by Columbia Records and on Epic Records and CBS Records International labels in Mexico, Spain, Ecuador and Peru. The album and single 45 were released in the US and Canada markets in 1980.

The success of "La de la Mochila Azul" was so great that he went on to star in the films, La niña de la mochila azul (1979) and the sequel "La niña de la mochila azul 2" (1981) in which actress Maria Rebeca gave life to the character Amy and he to the child named Raul. The creation of the movie put a name and a face to the girl with the blue backpack made famous by Pedrito's song and soon to be classic films.

Thirty years later as Pedro Fernández performed the song as part of his repertoire at the sold out National Auditorium concert in 2009, the record had already sold over 20 million copies.

In 2016 and more than 39 albums later, the record continues to sell, the title song is still requested at Pedro's concerts. Pedro always obliges his fans at concerts with at least a portion of the song which they all sing along with and to him.

== Track listing ==
#	Title	Writer(s)	Length
1	"La de la Mochila Azul"	Bulmaro Bermúdez	2:46
2	"Ay Hermanitos Mios"	Tomas Villarrea	2:40
3	"Canto A La Madre"	Marcelina Nuñez de Velasco	3:00
4	"Palomita Blanca"	Marcial Puente	2:39
5	"Corriente Y Canelo"	Homero Aguilar	2:58
6	"Mi Salon Esta De Fiesta"	Bulmaro Bermúdez	2:34
7	"Mi Aguililla Pecho Blanco"	Homero Aguilar	3:20
8	"Mi Caballito De Madera"	Salvador Velázquez	2:55
9	"Yo Quiero Tener Papa"	Miguel Flores	2:20
10	"El Oreja Rajada"	Antonio Becerra	3:03

== See also ==
- La niña de la mochila azul
