= Mi Forma De Sentir =

Mi Forma de Sentir
- Mi Forma De Sentir album cover

Studio album by Pedro Fernández
- Released: 1994–1995
- Recorded: 1994
- Genres: Latin pop, mariachi, ranchera, Latin ballad
- Length: 55:36
- Language: Spanish
- Labels: PolyGram Latino, Universal Music Latino
- Director: Manuel Calderón
- Producer: Mariane Somonte

Pedro Fernández chronology
Lo Mucho Que Te Quiero (1993)	Mi Forma de Sentir (1994)	Pedro Fernández (1995)

Mi Forma de Sentir (My way of feeling) is an album by Mexican recording artist Pedro Fernández, released by Universal Music Latino on November 11, 1994.

Fernandez became a full-grown romantic balladeer on this 1995 set. While his roots are in ranchera and mariachi, he has no problem making modern sounding albums: The hit title track is a traditionally styled ballad, but with synthesizers instead of accordions. Featured here is a rare vocal in English: Willie Nelson's "Crazy" is done with the original lyric, and then again in Spanish as "Loco." His vocal is equally emotive on each, and he even tops Engelbert Humperdinck's crooning on "Release Me."

"Mi Forma de Sentir", earned him international fame by reaching Platinum in Mexico and Double Platinum in the United States, Venezuela and Chile, among others. "Si Te Vas" would go on to win Pedro two BMI awards. Two years later, in 1996, he presented his album "Deseos y Delirios", which includes recognized songs like "Si Tú Supieras", "Mi Forma de Sentir" and "El Sinaloense". That album sold more than 300 thousand copies.

== Track listing ==
No.	Title	Composer(s)	Length
1.	"Mi Forma de Sentir"	Javier Martín del Campo	4:04
2.	"Teresa"	Sergio Endrigo	3:57
3.	"Loco"	Willie Nelson	2:42
4.	"El Dinero No Es la Vida"	Luis Alcaráz	3:11
5.	"Bonita"	Luis Alcaráz, José Antonio Zorrilla	3:16
6.	"Los Recuerdos de Tu Amor"	Eddie Miller, Dub Willams, Robert Yount	3:14
7.	"Que Te Ha Dado Esa Mujer"	Gilberto Parra, Gilberto Parra Paz	5:02
8.	"El Que Más Te Amo"	Leo Dan	4:08
9.	"Vamos a Platicar"	Héctor Meneses	3:46
10.	"Puras Mentiras"	Ariel Barreras	3:04
11.	"Si Te Vas"	Pedro Fernández	3:42
12.	"Crazy"	Willie Nelson	2:42
13.	"Release Me"	Eddie Miller, Dub Willams, Robert Yount	3:14
14.	"Popurrí de Luis Alcaráz" (As de Corazones / Rimel / Prisionero del Amor / Muñequita de Squire / Viajera / El Que Pierda una Mujer / Quinto Patio)	Luis Alcaráz	9:25
Total length:			55:36

== Charts ==
Chart (1995)	Peak position
US Top Latin Albums (Billboard)	16
US Regional Mexican Albums (Billboard)	8

== Sales ==
Region	Certification	Certified units/sales
Mexico	—	100,000
