= Delincuente =

- Poster of the movie
- Directed by: Sergio Véjar
- Produced by: Daniel Galindo
- Starring: Lucerito; Pedrito Fernández; Arturo Alegría; Nuria Bages
- Distributed by: Televicine
- Release date: 1984 (Mexico)
- Running time: 100 minutes
- Country: Mexico
- Language: Spanish

Delincuente (in English: Delinquent) is a 1984 Mexican musical romance film. In this movie the writers aimed to please the fans of the co-stars Lucerito and Pedrito, since they had been unhappy that Lucerito's character had died in an earlier movie starring the two, Coqueta.

== Synopsis ==
Cecilia Suárez (Lucerito) poses for a portrait for a painter who is a friend of hers. One night this painter and a group of his friends go on a spree and meet Alejandro (Pedro Fernández) a young orphan who lives on the streets, so they decided to adopt him. Alejandro discovers the portrait and falls in love with Cecilia Suárez. He decides to meet her and tries to win her love, changing his manners and behavior, since she is a wealthy woman.

== Cast ==
- Lucero as Cecilia Suárez
- Pedro Fernández as Alejandro
- Nuria Bages as Cecilia's mother
- José Elías Moreno as Gonzalo
- Arturo Alegría
- Chico Che
