= Homero Patrón =

Homero Patrón (born 5 September 1951 in Mazatlán, Sinaloa, Mexico, d. 4 July 2012 in Los Angeles, California) was an arranger, producer, musician and composer who worked with many of the most important artists in Latin music as well as in other musical genres.

== Professional background ==
=== Producer, Composer, Musical Arranger and Musical Director ===
A frequent collaborator in the studio, for many years in stage, Patrón worked with artists such as Marco Antonio Solís, Pedro Fernández, José José, Pepe Aguilar, Los Temerarios, Emmanuel, Rocío Dúrcal, Ray Conniff, Barry White, Tom Jones, Nana Mouskouri, Raphael, Nelson Ned, Juan Gabriel, Angeles Ochoa, Manoella Torres, Vicky Carr, Gualberto Castro, Angélica María, César Costa, Alberto Vazquez, Charles Aznavour, and José Luis Rodríguez "El Puma", to name just a few.

=== Producer ===
Producer credits for Patrón include albums for such artists as Marco Antonio Solís, Juan Gabriel, Lucha Villa, Javier Solís, Angeles Ochoa, Ana Gabriel, Yuri, Pedro Fernández, Vicky Carr, Olga Tañón, Vicente and Alejandro Fernández, Pepe Aguilar, Lucero, Alicia Villarreal, Pablo Montero, Ana Bárbara, Laura Flores and Nana Mouskouri.

=== Panelist ===
Homero Patrón was a frequent panelist in the area of music publishing, arranging and writing the next "hit song" for the Latin music market, including participation in

- Billboard Regional Mexican Music Summit
- BMI Latin
- Monitor Latino

== Honors ==
=== Latin Grammy 2001, Regional Mexican album of the year ===
Homero Patron received a Latin Grammy for the year 2001 for his work as producer of the Regional Mexican album Yo No Fuí of singer Pedro Fernández and a Latin Grammy for the year 2009 for his work as producer of the best album grupero for singer Marco Antonio Solís (No Molestar).
