= Arránquense Muchachos =

¡Arránquense Muchachos!
- Arránquense Muchachos album cover

Studio album by Pedro Fernández
- Released: August 17, 2018
- Recorded: 2018
- Genre: Latin pop, Mariachi, Ranchera, Latin ballad
- Length: 44:00
- Language: Spanish
- Label: 2018 Pedro Fernández, Sony Music Mexico
- Director: Jorge Avendaño Lührs
- Producer: Pedro Fernández

Pedro Fernández chronology
Acaríciame El Corazón (2015)	¡Arránquense Muchachos! (2018)

Arránquense Muchachos (Start Boys) is an album by Mexican recording artist Pedro Fernández, released independently by “Pedro Fernández 2018” on August 17, 2018 and distributed by Sony Music Entertainment.

This is album number 40 in the career of Pedro Fernández, and was recorded in Mexico City and Monterrey, Nuevo León. It contains 13 songs that include the executive production of Pedro Fernández and the musical direction of Jorge Avendaño.

"Arránquense Muchachos" besides being the title of the album, was also the first promotional cut, a melody that emerged from the inspiration of Israel Dasis.

After that success, would give way to "Como Ella" second single which is already heard on the radio since its launch in July.

The title cut from the album “Arránquense Muchachos” was nominated for the 19th Annual Latin Grammy Awards 2018. Best Regional Song.

== Track listing ==
No.	Title	Composer(s)	Length
1.	"Cuando Te Vayas"	Alberto Aguilera Valadez	3:20
2.	"Se Está Cocinando"	Carlos Cabral, Erik Chávez Guerrero	2:52
3.	"Me Enamoré de una Mujer Casada"	Yoel Henríquez	3:42
4.	"Amigo Mío"	José Martín Cuevas Cobos	2:47
5.	"Necesita Amor"	Domingo Leyva Delgado (Israel Dasis)	2:50
6.	"Arránquense Muchachos"	Domingo Leyva Delgado (Israel Dasis)	2:44
7.	"Como Ella"	Cuitláhuac Vega Toledo	3:51
8.	"Gitana Hechicera"	Pedro Pubill Calaf	4:39
9.	"Mejor Háblame de Tú"	Manuel Herrera Maldonado	3:01
10.	"No Siento Más Dolor"	Carlos Cabral, Mario Guerrero	3:48
11.	"Si Me Lo Hubieras Pedido"	Jorge Avendaño Lührs	4:09
12.	"Súper Enamorado"	Carlos Cabral, Yoel Henríquez	3:33
13.	"Dile a Él"	Javier Manriquez Mendoza	3:01
Total length:			44:00
