= Cemetery of Terror =

- Spanish: Cementerio del terror
- Directed by: Rubén Galindo Jr.
- Screenplay by: Rubén Galindo Jr. Carlos Valdemar
- Produced by: Raúl Galindo
- Starring: Hugo Stiglitz
- Cinematography: Luis Medina; Rosalío Solano
- Edited by: Carlos Savage
- Music by: Chucho Zarzosa
- Production companies: Dynamic Films Inc.; Producciones Torrente S.A.
- Release dates: April 5, 1985 (Los Angeles) (Note: The film was reviewed by Los Angeles Times journalist Gregg Barrios as a new release the weekend of April 5, 1985, placing its release date then.); December 12, 1985 (Mexico)
- Running time: 91 minutes
- Country: Mexico
- Language: Spanish

Cemetery of Terror (Spanish: Cementerio del terror) is a 1985 Mexican supernatural slasher film directed by Rubén Galindo Jr. and starring Hugo Stiglitz, Servando Manzetti, Andrés García Jr., María Rebeca, and René Cardona III.

== Plot ==
Medical students Jorge and Oscar trick their friend Pedro, his girlfriend, Lena, and their girlfriends, Olivia and Mariana, into breaking into an abandoned house for a Halloween party. Meanwhile, psychiatrist Dr. Cardan is informed that one of his patients, Devlon—a serial killer who was obsessed with Satan—escaped a psychiatric hospital and was killed in the process. Cardan, aware of Devlon's power, seeks a judge's clearance to have Devlon's body cremated.

Jorge and Oscar bring their friends to the large abandoned mansion, which was owned by Devlon prior to his institutionalization. The young women, Olivia, Mariana, and Lena, are all angered by this, as each had been lured there under the guise that they would be attending a different type of event. In the attic, Jorge finds a book of Satanic incantations belonging to Devlon, and proposes that they steal a corpse and attempt to bring it back from the dead. The group break into the university hospital morgue and steal one of the corpses, unaware that it is that of Devlon. Cardan arrives at the morgue to have Devlon's corpse cremated, but the youth have already managed to steal it.

The group bring Devlon's body to a cemetery where Jorge performs a ritual, which frightens all the others, causing them to flee the cemetery and return to the house, unaware that they have resurrected Devlon. Back at the house, Mariana is attacked and killed by Devlon on the porch. Oscar finds her body outside, and is also attacked and killed. Olivia goes to investigate the noise outside and finds Oscar's corpse, causing her to flee into the house in hysterics. Devlon proceeds to kill Jorge and disembowel Olivia, before stabbing Lena to death upstairs. Pedro witnesses Lena's death through the window from outside, and arms himself with a hatchet, which begins to levitate on its own before bludgeoning him to death.

Meanwhile, young teenager Tony visits the cemetery along with two classmates, Usi and Cesar, along with two younger neighbors, Anita and Raúl, who have been trick-or-treating. They encounter Devlon's tomb bursting into flames, which sends them running in fear. They seek shelter in the abandoned house, where they find the multiple dead bodies. Devlon appears and chases the children upstairs. Tony arms himself with the hatchet from Pedro's head, and flee the house. As they run through the cemetery, various corpses—each awoken by Devlon—begin to rise from their graves and attack the children.

Cardan, who has gone to search Devlon's house, finds the children in the cemetery and attempts to save them. Cardan becomes pinned under a fallen branch and injures his leg. Her tells the children they must burn Devlon's book of incantations to stop the zombies, and sends them back to the house while he wards off the undead with a crucifix. The children retrieve the book as the zombies, with Devlon at the helm, descend upon the house. Cardan arrives to save them, and wards off the violent Devlon. Usi throws the book into the fireplace, causing all of the undead to burst into flames. Shortly after, police, who have been searching for the missing children, come to their rescue. In the last scene, Cardan brings the charred remains of the book to the altar in the attic, now apparently possessed by Devlon himself.

== Cast ==
- Hugo Stiglitz as Dr. Cardan (as Hugo Stieglitz)
- José Gómez Parcero as Devlon
- Raúl Meraz as Captain Ancira
- René Cardona III as Oscar
- Servando Manzetti as Jorge
- Andrés García Jr. as Pedro
- María Rebeca as Anita
- César Adrian Sanchez as Raúl
- Eduardo Capetillo as Tony
- Mineko Mori as Vicky
- Usi Velasco as Usi
- César Velasco as César
- Erika Buenfil as Lena
- Jacqueline Castro as Mariana
- Edna Bolkan as Olivia

== Production ==
The film was shot on location in Brownsville, Texas.

== Release ==
The film was theatrically released in Mexico in December 1985 and was a notable commercial success in the country despite many Mexican critics' very unfavourable reviews.

=== Critical response ===
Gregg Barrios of the Los Angeles Times gave the film a favorable review, noting that, "whatever the plot defects, [director] Galino, a USC film school graduate, puts the audience through a workout Jane Fonda might envy. His slick style owes much to his family involvement in Mexican productions—now it remains to be seen what he can do with less derivative material."

=== Home media ===
The film was released as a double feature on DVD in 2006 by BCI Home Media, paired with Grave Robbers (1989).

== See also ==
- List of films set around Halloween
