= Artistic swimming at the 2023 Pan American Games – Qualification =

The following is the qualification system and qualified countries for the artistic swimming at the 2023 Pan American Games scheduled to be held in Santiago, Chile from November 2 to 5, 2023.

== Qualification system ==
A total of 80 artistic swimmers will qualify to compete at the games. As host nation, Chile qualifies the maximum team size of nine athletes (eight athletes + a reserve). Seven other teams will qualify (each with nine athletes). Each team will also be required to compete in the duet event with athletes already qualified for the team event. A further four countries will qualify a duet only.

The United States and Canada, as being the only members located in zone 3 and zone 4 respectively, automatically qualify a full team. The South American region and the Central American and Caribbean region will qualify three teams and five duets each. Therefore, a total of eight teams and twelve duets will qualify.

== Qualification timeline ==
Event	Date	Venue
2022 South American Games	October 7–9, 2022	Asunción, Paraguay
2023 Central American and Caribbean Games	June 24–28, 2023	San Salvador, El Salvador

== Qualification summary ==
NOC	Team	Duet	Athletes
Argentina		X	2
Aruba		X	2
Brazil	X	X	9
Canada	X	X	9
Chile	X	X	9
Colombia	X	X	9
Costa Rica		X	2
Cuba	X	X	9
El Salvador	X	X	9
Mexico	X	X	9
United States	X	X	9
Uruguay		X	2
Total: 12 NOC's	8	12	80

== Team ==
Competition	Quota(s)	Qualified
Host nation	1	Chile
Zone 3	1	United States
Zone 4	1	Canada
2022 South American Games	2	Brazil; Colombia
2023 Central American and Caribbean Games	3	Mexico; El Salvador; Cuba
Total	8	

== Duet ==
Competition	Quota(s)	Qualified
Host nation	1	Chile
Zone 3	1	United States
Zone 4	1	Canada
2022 South American Games	2	Brazil; Colombia
2022 South American Games	2	Argentina; Uruguay
2022 Central American and Caribbean Games	3	Mexico; El Salvador; Cuba
2022 Central American and Caribbean Games	2	Aruba*; Costa Rica
Total	12	

- Aruba originally qualified a team, but declined the spot in favour of just a duet. Cuba replaced Aruba in the team event.
