= Cómo te extraño =

- Directed by: Enrique Cahen Salaberry
- Starring: Leo Dan; Claudia Mores; Leonor Rinaldi; Pedro Quartucci
- Release date: 1966
- Country: Argentina
- Language: Spanish

Cómo te extraño (transl. How I miss you) is a 1966 Argentine musical, comedy film directed by Enrique Cahen Salaberry. It starred Leo Dan, Claudia Mores, Leonor Rinaldi and Pedro Quartucci.

== Plot ==
An air stewardess wishes for her father to return to Europe with her. While she endeavors to persuade him to leave the ranch, the ranch foreman tries to prevent that outcome.

== Production notes ==
- The movie was filmed in Cosquín, province of Córdoba, part of it in Norberto de la Riestra, province of Buenos Aires, and had the alternative title Cómo te extraño mi amor...!
- It was also known as Quédate conmigo.
