= Grave Robbers (film) =

- Film poster
- Spanish: Ladrones de tumbas
- Directed by: Rubén Galindo Jr.
- Written by: Carlos Valdemar
- Story by: Rubén Galindo Jr.
- Produced by: Raúl Galindo
- Starring: Fernando Almada; Edna Bolkan; Erika Buenfil; Ernesto Laguardia; María Rebeca
- Cinematography: Antonio de Anda
- Edited by: Antonio López Zepeda
- Music by: Jon Michael Bischof; René Castillo; Ricardo Galindo; Hnos. Warner
- Production company: Producciones Torrente S.A.
- Distributed by: Televisa S.A. de C.V.
- Release date: 3 November 1989
- Running time: 88 minutes
- Country: Mexico
- Language: Spanish

Grave Robbers (Spanish: Ladrones de tumbas) is a 1989 Mexican slasher film written and directed by Rubén Galindo Jr., and co-written by Carlos Valdemar. Agustín Bernal stars as an undead Satanist who, after being accidentally awakened by grave robbers played by Erika Buenfil, Ernesto Laguardia, German Bernal, and María Rebeca, sets out to bring about Armageddon by impregnating a virgin (Edna Bolkan) with the Antichrist.

== Plot ==
In the Mexican town of San Ramón, the executioner of an Inquisition-era Catholic church chooses Satan in favor of God, and attempts to rape a virgin in order to impregnate her with the Antichrist. He is caught and tortured by other members of the clergy, who demand that he renounce Satan. The executioner defies them, and is hacked in the chest with an ax by the archbishop; before he dies, the executioner declares, "Some day someone will come and wrench the ax out. Then I'll return with more power to father Satan's son in one of your descendants."

Centuries later, Olivia Lopez, a virginal descendant of the archbishop, goes camping with three of her friends near a cemetery that has just been broken into by a group of grave robbers consisting of Manolo, his psychic girlfriend, Rebeca, and their friends Armando and Diana. The quartet unearth a shaft that leads to the ruined basement of the abandoned Catholic church, where they discover treasure (including a small Satanic figure) and the tomb of the executioner; Manolo pulls the ax out of the executioner's chest. As the plunderers try to leave with their booty, their pickup truck becomes stuck in the mud, but they receive assistance from a pair of peasants named Pablo and Toño. The revived executioner reclaims the ax and uses it to kill the peasants, whose deaths are blamed on the grave robbers by Captain Lopez, Olivia's father. The quartet profess their innocence to Lopez, and implore him to investigate the tomb where they found the ax that was used to kill Pablo and Toño.

Lopez realizes that the real killer is still on the loose when two more people are murdered, so he races out into the wilderness to warn Olivia and her friends, accompanied by Olivia's fiancé, Raul. The executioner slaughters Raul and all of Olivia's friends, but is temporarily driven off by a machine gun-wielding Lopez. Lopez searches the executioner's tomb for answers, and finds an ancient book written in Latin that he brings to Father Jerónimo. At the police station, the grave robbers are broken out of their cell by their friends Andrea and Jorge.

The executioner uses supernatural powers to attack Father Jerónimo and kill Armando and Jorge before appearing in-person to butcher Andrea and Diana. He then kills Olivia's bodyguard and abducts her while the injured Father Jerónimo informs Lopez that the executioner is empowered by Satan, and must be vanquished using the ax and the Satanic figure before he can impregnate Olivia with the Antichrist. As Father Jerónimo holds a midnight mass, Lopez works with Manolo and Rebeca to save Olivia. Rebeca rescues Olivia while Lopez steals the Satanic figure and the ax from the executioner and uses them against him, robbing the executioner of his power; Manolo finishes the executioner off by blowing him up with dynamite. As the executioner burns away into nothingness, Manolo kisses Rebeca.

== Cast ==
- Agustín Bernal as The Executioner
- Fernando Almada as The Archbishop/Captain López
- Erika Buenfil as Rebeca de la Huerta
- Toño Infante as Officer Lalo
- Tony Bravo as Raúl
- Edna Bolkan as Olivia López
- Ana Graham as Mónica
- Colette Payen as Fernanda
- Marianne Hallman as Viky
- Ernesto Laguardia as Manolo Andrade
- German Bernal as Armando
- María Rebeca as Diana Álvarez
- Andrea Legarreta as Andrea
- Andres Bonfiglio as Jorge
- Aldalberto Arvizu as Pablo
- Sammy Ortiz as Toño
- Roberto Cañedo as Father Jerónimo

== Reception ==
Ian Jane of DVD Talk felt that Grave Robber's plot and acting were a mess, but went on to say that the film was nevertheless "a fun ride" that was "plenty entertaining" and "worth seeing for the special effects." DVD Review's Guido Henkel wrote, "Cemetery of Terror and Grave Robbers are not particularly good films – and neither are they exceedingly bad – but they are products of their respective times. The plots are just as simple and formulaic as anything that Fulci or de Ossorio did in their films, and both movies do have a very dense atmosphere that perfectly sets the mood for these zombie slasher horror flicks." Steve Barton of Dread Central applauded the film's gore, and concluded, "though it's not as good as Cemetery of Terror, this little slice of Mexican hell still whips a serious amount of ass." In a review written for CHUD.com, Wade Gum noted that while Grave Robbers was impressively gory, it was also a rather generic 1980s slasher film; he went on to say, "If you're looking for standard drive-in, B movie gore, there are worse films you could go with. However, it's not like there's any real short supply of those movies in English." Glenn Kay, the author of Zombie Movies: The Ultimate Guide, opined that the film felt outdated and absurd, but conceded, "However, it isn't boring, and some viewers may appreciate its laugh-inducing, credibility-straining antics."
