= Deseos Y Delirios =

- Deseos Y Delirios album cover

Greatest hits album by Pedro Fernández
- Released: November 26, 1996
- Recorded: 1996
- Genre: Latin pop, Latin ballad, Mariachi, Ranchera
- Length: 59:00
- Language: Spanish
- Label: Universal Music Latino a división of Universal Music Latin Entertainment
- Producer: Homero Patron

Pedro Fernández chronology
Pedro Fernández (1995)	Deseos Y Delirios (1996)	Un Mundo Raro:Tributo a José Alfredo Jiménez (1997)

Deseos Y Delirios (Desires and Delusions) is a greatest hits album by Mexican recording artist Pedro Fernández, released by Universal Music Latino a division of Universal Music Latin Entertainment on November 26, 1996. Deseos Y Delirios contains a single disc with 16 songs.

Deseos Y Delirios (Sus Exitos - the successes/greatest hits) is full of traditional and romantic songs and includes the previously released multiple BMI Latin Awards winning song authored by Pedro Fernández, "Si Te Vas" (If You Go), (Si Te Vas (Pedro Fernández song)) and well-known songs such as "Si Tú Supieras" (If you knew), "Mi Forma De Sentir" (My way of feeling) and "El Sinaloense" (The Sinaloa).

As reported by Polygram Records in the CD credit insert, "Ranchera music has acquired a new dimension in the interpretation of Pedro Fernandez. This album, in addition to previously unreleased tracks gathers the most select of the repertoire that has been recorded in his latest albums and which have sold in Latin America more than 2,000,000 copies and setting a new record for sales of Ranchera music outside our country. (Mexico)"

This album reached #2 on the Billboard Top 15 Regional Mexican Album chart January 25, 1997. The album remained in the top fifteen for 37 weeks and was at the 13th position in its final week. At the same time this album was #2, another album by Pedro, self-titled "Pedro Fernández", was at position 15 after 43 weeks reaching as high as #3 on the chart in May 1996.

== Track listing ==
#	Title	Writer(s)	Length
1	"Deseos y Delirios (Corazón)"	Lula Barbosa, Ana Lucía Rubens Alarcón, Graciela Carballo	4:43
2	"Fueron Tres Años"	Juan Pablo Marín	3:15
3	"Si Tú Supieras"	Rodolfo Barrera	4:35
4	"Virgen India"	Hnos. Albarracín	3:45
5	"Lo Mucho Que Te Quiero"	Ibarra, Ornelas, Herrera, F. Riba	3:18
6	"Enamorada"	Consuelo Velázquez	3:46
7	"Mi Forma De Sentir"	Javier Martín Del Campo	4:04
8	"Gema"	Guicho Cisneros	2:43
9	"Quien"	Jaime Enciso	3:56
10	"Los Hombres No Deben Llorar"	Mario Zan, Palmeira, Pepe Avila	3:48
11	"El Dinero No Es La Vida"	Luis Arcaraz, Mario M. Montes	3:11
12	"Si Te Vas"	Pedro Fernández	3:42
13	"El Sinaloense"	Severiano Briseño	2:50
14	"Vamos A Platicar"	Héctor Meneses	3:47
15	"La Mujer Que Amas"	B. Adams, R.J. Lange, M. Kamen	4:56
16	"Si Tú Supieras (Versión Balada)"	Rodolfo Barrera	3:29

== Charts ==
=== Peak positions ===
Chart (1997)	Peak position
U.S. Hot Latin Songs	26
U.S. Billboard Top Latin Albums	6
U.S. Billboard Regional Mexican Albums	2

== See also ==
- Si Te Vas (Pedro Fernández song)
