= 2020 Premios Juventud =

Premios Juventud 2020
- Date: August 13, 2020
- Location: Seminole Hard Rock Hotel & Casino Hollywood; Hollywood, Florida
- Country: United States (US)
- Hosted by: Sebastian Yatra

Highlights
- Most awards: Bad Bunny (8)
- Most nominations: J Balvin (12)

Television/radio coverage
- Network: Univision
- Viewership: 1.56 million

The 2020 Premios Juventud ceremony was held on August 13, 2020. Univision broadcast the show live from the Seminole Hard Rock Hotel & Casino Hollywood in Hollywood, Florida. Premios Juventud aims to inspire, motivate and empower Latino youth to become leaders for change. The awards celebrate the current trends in pop culture, music, digital, fashion, television and social media. Sebastián Yatra, Ana Patricia Gámez, Francisca Lachapel, Julissa Calderon and Borja Voces hosted the event.

== Performers ==
Mexican-American singer Ally Brooke, Dominican singer Natti Natasha, Colombian singer Greeicy Rendón and Mexican singer Danna Paola paid tribute to late tejano superstar Selena, in commemoration of the 25 years since her death.

== Winners and nominees ==
Winners are written in bold.

=== Triple Threat ===
Social Media platforms, television, film or music

- **Juanpa Zurita**
- Danileigh
- Isabela Merced
- Luisa Fernanda W
- Mario Bautista

=== Producer you know by Shout-Out ===
- **Chris Jedi & Gaby Music**
- Dimelo Flow
- DJ Snake
- Play-N-Skillz
- Ovy on the Drums
- Sky Rompiendo
- Steve Aoki
- Subelo Neo
- Tainy
- Will.I.Am

=== Spicy Regional Songs ===
- **"Amor tumbado’" - Natanael Cano**
- "Cosas de la clica’" - Herencia de Patrones
- "El amor no fue pa' mí" - Grupo Firme ft. Banda Coloso
- "El circo" - El Fantasma
- "Yo ya no vuelvo contigo" - Lenin Ramírez ft. Grupo Firme

=== Can't Get Enough Of This Song ===
- **"Tusa" - Karol G ft. Nicki Minaj**
- "Mi Meta Contigo" - Banda Los Sebastianes
- "Pegao" - CNCO ft. Manuel Turizo
- "Ritmo (Bad Boys For Life)" - Black Eyed Peas & J Balvin
- "Se me olvidó" - Christian Nodal

=== And Featuring... ===
- **J Balvin**
- Daddy Yankee
- Natti Natasha
- Manuel Turizo
- Anuel AA

=== This Choreo Is On Fire ===
- **"Que Tire Pa Lante" - Daddy Yankee**
- "Aguardiente" - Greeicy
- "Amarillo" - J Balvin
- Bogaloo supreme" - Victor Manuelle y Wisin
- "Whine up" - Nicky Jam y Anuel AA

=== Best LOL Award ===
- **Louie Castro**
- Alex Guzman
- Gadiel del Orbe
- Lejuan James
- Salice Rose

=== Video With A Purpose ===
- **"Rojo" - J Balvin**
- "Aleluya" - Reik y Manuel Turizo
- "Me estás matando" - Natti Natasha
- "No ha parado de llover" - Maná y Sebastián Yatra
- "Tiburones" - Ricky Martin

=== Together They Fire Up My Feed ===
- **Karol G y Anuel AA**
- Camila Cabello y Shawn Mendes
- Nicky Jam y Cydney Moreau
- Rosalía y Kylie Jenner
- Sebastián Yatra y Mau y Ricky

=== Trendsetter ===
- **Bad Bunny**
- Billie Eilish
- Cazzu
- J Balvin
- Sofía Reyes

=== Nailed It ===
Has the best "Manicute"

- **Bad Bunny**
- Billie Eilish
- Cardi B
- Karol G
- Rosalía

=== #Stay Home Concert ===
- **Sech – ‘#YouTubeAndChill concert’**
- Alejandro Sanz & Juanes – ‘#LaGiraSeQuedaEnCasa’
- Carlos Vives – ‘#NoTeVayasDeTuCasa El show de Carlos Vives’
- Christian Nodal – ‘Juntos por la música #StayHome #WithMe #QuédateEnCasa’
- Gerardo Ortiz – ‘Juntos por la música #StayHome #WithMe #QuédateEnCasa’

=== The New Regional Mexican Generation ===
- **Natanael Cano**
- Álex Fernández
- Carin León
- Grupo Firme
- Neto Bernal

=== Name a Better Duo ===
- **Juanpa Zurita & Mario Ruiz**
- Analisse Rodriguez & Kat Rodríguez
- Calle y Poché
- Karen González & Sebastián Robles
- Martínez Twins

=== The Quarentune ===
- **‘En casita’ - Bad Bunny ft. Gabriela**
- ‘Cuando amanezca’ - Nibal, Justin Quiles, Danny Ocean, Feid
- ‘El mundo fuera’ - Alejandro Sanz
- ‘El tiempo pasa (Cuarentena)’ - Farruko, Sharo Towers, Andy Cay & Alex AC
- ‘Es hora de unirnos’ - Banda MS de Sergio Lizárraga
- ‘Esta cuarentena’ - Abraham Mateo
- ‘I believe that we will win’ - Pitbull
- ‘Resistencia’ - Kendo Kaponi
- ‘Tomar distancia’ - Piso 21
- ‘Color esperanza (2020)’ - Artistas múltiples: Diego Torres, Nicky Jam, Reik, Camilo, Farruko, Rubén Blades, Camila, Carlos Vives, Mau y Ricky, Thalía, Leslie Grace, Rauw Alejandro, Prince Royce, Pedro Capó, Kany García, Leonel Garcia, Río Roma, Diego El Cigala, Jorge Villamizar, Carlos Rivera, Ivete Sangalo, Coti Sorokin, Lali, Gente de Zona, Fonseca, Dani Martín, Manuel Turizo, Ángela Torres, Ara Malikian, Dilsinho

=== The Traffic Jam ===
- **‘China’ - Anuel AA ft. Daddy Yankee, Ozuna, Karol G & J Balvin**
- ‘Escondidos’ - La Adictiva
- ‘Me quedaré contigo’ - Pitbull X Ne-Yo ft. Lenier & El Micha
- ‘No elegí conocerte’ - Banda MS de Sergio Lizárraga
- ‘Que tire pa' 'lante’ - Daddy Yankee

=== #Pet Goals ===
- **Karol G y Anuel AA con Goku**
- El Dasa con Benito
- Frida Sofía con Phillippe
- J Balvin con Paz y Felicidad
- Maluma con Bonnie y Clyde

=== Influencer With A Cause ===
- **Canelo Álvarez**
- Edwin Castro
- Indya Moore
- Jessica y JP Domínguez
- Julissa Calderón

=== Hair Obsessed ===
- **J Balvin**
- Amara La Negra
- Camilo
- Jennifer Lopez
- Pabllo Vittar

=== Sneakerhead ===
- **Bad Bunny**
- De La Ghetto
- Karol G
- J Balvin
- Rosalía

=== Breaking the Internet ===
- **Lunay**
- Chiquis Rivera
- Karol G
- Maluma
- Natti Natasha

=== High Fashion ===
- **Bad Bunny**
- Jennifer Lopez
- Maluma
- Sofía Carson
- Thalía

=== OMG Collaboration ===
- **Natanael Cano & Bad Bunny – ‘Soy el diablo (remix)’**
- Banda MS De Sergio Lizárraga & Snoop Dogg – ‘Qué maldición’
- Reykon & Willie Colón – ‘Perriando (La murga remix)’
- Shakira & Anuel AA – ‘Me gusta’
- T3r Elemento & Farruko – ‘Del barrio a la ciudad’

=== The New Generation - Female ===
- **Cazzu**
- Emilia
- Jessie Reyez
- Mariah Angeliq
- Yennis

=== Scroll Stopper ===
- **Bad Bunny**
- Cardi B
- Guaynaa
- Sebastián Yatra
- Thalía

=== The Perfect Mix ===
- **‘China’ - Anuel AA ft. Daddy Yankee, Ozuna, Karol G & J Balvin**
- ‘Indeciso’ - Reik, J Balvin & Lalo Ebratt
- ‘Pegao’ - CNCO ft. Manuel Turizo
- ‘Qué maldición’ - Banda MS de Sergio Lizárraga ft. Snoop Dogg
- ‘Qué pena’ - Maluma ft. J Balvin

=== The New Generation - Male ===
- **Lunay**
- El Alfa
- Jhay Cortez
- Myke Towers
- Rauw Alejandro

=== Can't Get Enough ===
- **Bad Bunny**
- Frida Sofía
- Jennifer Lopez
- Karol G
- Sebastián Yatra
