= Un corazón para dos =

- Directed by: Sergio Véjar
- Produced by: Daniel Galindo
- Starring: Pedro Fernández; Daniela Leites
- Release date: 2 August 1990
- Running time: 90 minutes
- Country: Mexico
- Language: Spanish

Un corazón para dos ("A heart for two") is a 1990 Mexican film. It stars Pedro Fernández and Daniela Leites, directed by Sergio Véjar.

== Plot ==
Bernardo is secretly in love with his friend Valeria, but has not gathered the courage to express his true feelings. When he learns that he does not have much time to live, he must confront Valeria and let her know how he feels. When Bernardo learns about Valeria's heart condition he makes the heartbreaking decision to donate his heart to her to show his love.

== Cast ==
- Pedro Fernández
- Daniela Leites
- Mario Almada
- José Elías Moreno
- Elsa Cárdenas
- Aurora Alonso
- Queta Lavat
- Carmelita González
- Chantal Andere
- Mariana Levy
