= Cachito de Cielo (song) =

- Pedro Fernández

Single by Pedro Fernández

from the album No Que No... edición especial
- Released: 2013
- Recorded: 2012
- Genre: Ranchera, Latin ballad, Mariachi, Latin pop
- Length: 4:05
- Label: Capitol Latin, Universal Music Latin Entertainment
- Songwriter(s): Pedro Fernández
- Producer(s): Pedro Fernández
- Winner: Latin Grammy Best Song 2013

Cachito de Cielo (Little bit of Heaven), is a song written, arranged and performed by Mexican recording artist Pedro Fernández. The song was released on the special edition album "No Que No... edición especial" in 2012 and released as a single in 2013.

This song was the theme song of the popular telenovela Cachito de cielo in which Pedro starred as the protagonist. He wrote the song while thinking about the plot of the novel.

Pedro Fernández won the Latin Grammy Award for Best Regional Mexican Song (2013) as songwriter and performing artist for "Cachito de Cielo". Live performance. This was Pedro's third Latin Grammy Awarded to him for his music.
