= Resortes =

Mexican actor and comedian (1916–2003)

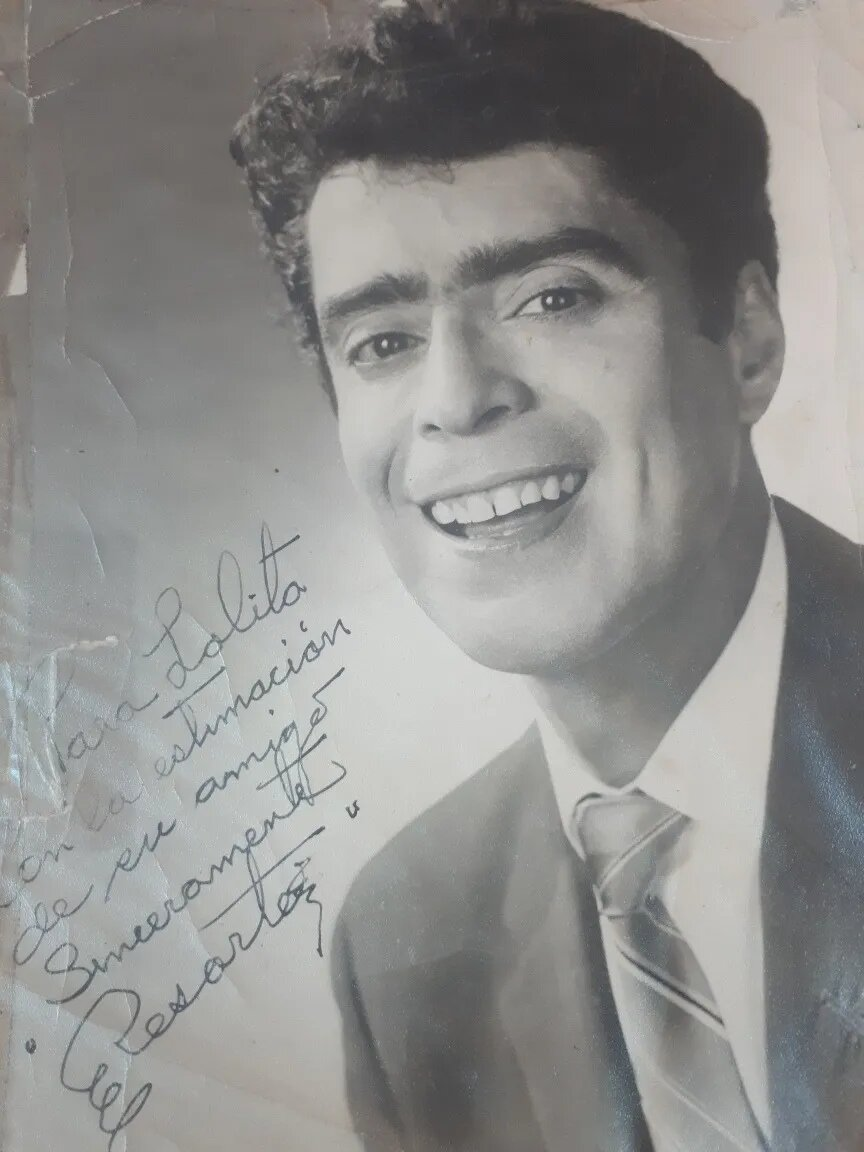
- Resortes, c. 1940s
- Born: Adalberto Martínez Chávez; January 25, 1916; Mexico City, Mexico
- Died: April 4, 2003 (aged 87); Mexico City, Mexico
- Resting place: Mausoleos del Ángel; Mexico City, Mexico
- Other name: Resortes
- Years active: 1948–2002
- Children: 2
- Relatives: Alex Martinez

Adalberto Martínez Chávez (25 January 1916 – April 4, 2003), known as Resortes, was a Mexican actor and comedian. Known primarily for his talent as a comedian actor, he was also a dancer. His stage name is Spanish for "spring", or also "coil".

Resortes, who began his career as a member of a circus, made his motion picture debut in 1946. He participated in more than 50 Mexican movies throughout his career, and he also participated in many television series. Many of his best films he made were El Rey de México El Oreja Rajada (The King of Mexico), El Cartero del Barrio, Al son del mambo (To the Mambo's Rhythm) and El Futbolista Fenómeno (The Phenomenal Soccer Player). But one of his most famous movies was La Niña de la Mochila Azul (The Girl With the Blue Back Pack). That movie also had a sequel, La Niña de la Mochila Azul 2 (The Girl With the Blue Back Pack 2). Those two movies in particular became two of the largest teen movie hits in Mexican movie history and helped Resortes gain familiarity among the younger generations during the 1980s.

Resortes was hospitalized with emphysema on April 3, 2003, and died on April 4.

== Selected filmography ==
- Voices of Spring (1947)
- Confessions of a Taxi Driver (1949)
- To the Sound of the Mambo (1950)
- They Say I'm a Communist (1951)
- Hot Rhumba (1952)
- My Three Merry Widows (1953)
- The King of Mexico (1956)
- Asesinos, S.A. (1957)
- La presidenta municipal (1975)
- La Niña de la Mochila Azul (1979)
- La esperanza de los pobres (1983)
- Miracles (1986)
