= Agustín Bernal =

Mexican actor

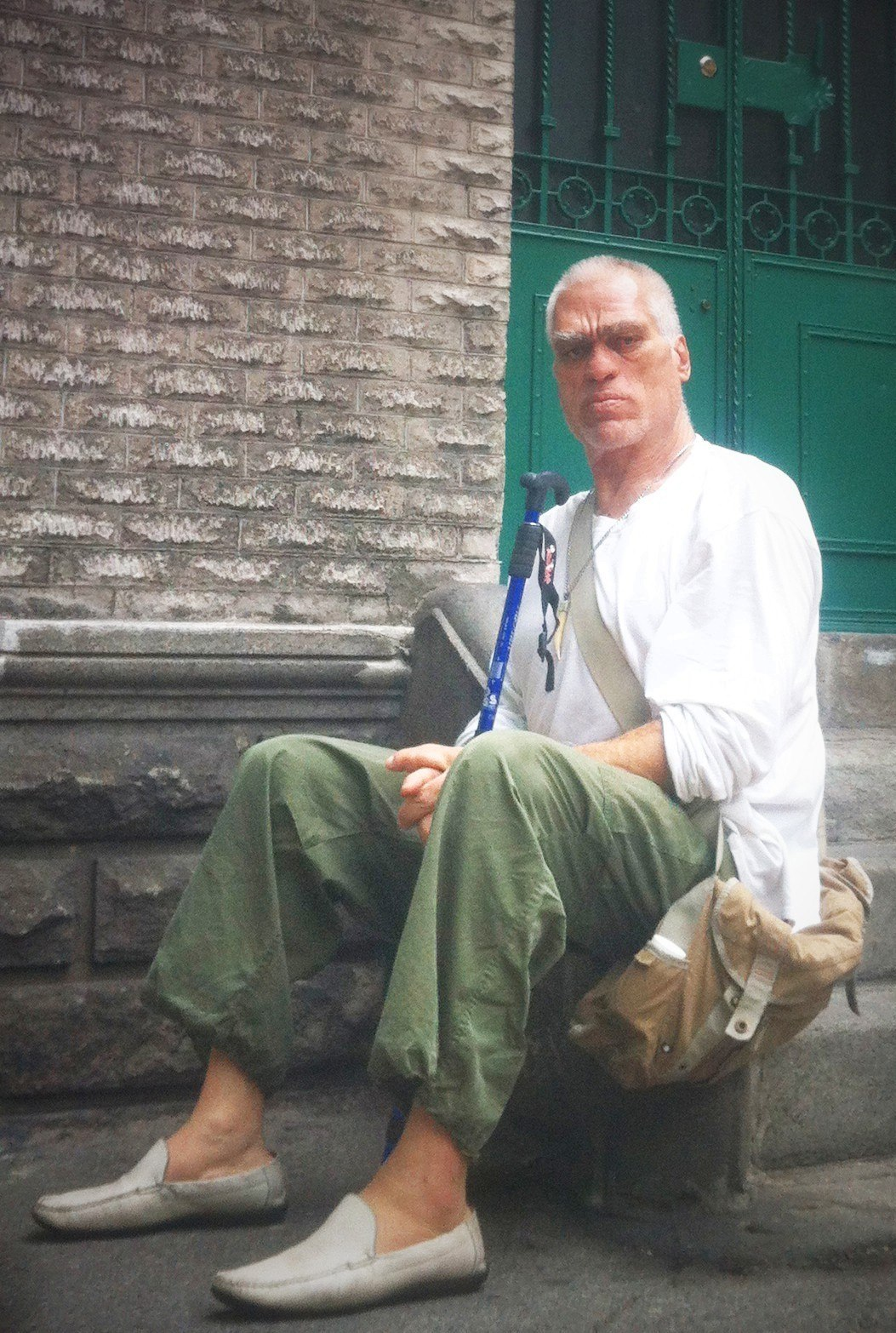
Agustin Bernal taking a rest outside

Agustín Bernal (born Romualdo Bucío Bucío; 1959 in the town of El Cahulote in Parácuaro, Michoacán – 8 January 2018) was a Mexican actor, film director, writer, and producer, mostly known for his frequent appearances in Mexican urban westerns, action films, and crime thrillers. He is sometimes credited as Augustine Bernal. He died at the age of 59 in Pharr, Texas.

== Career ==
Most of his portrayals included tough, violent cops or vigilantes, and cruel, ruthless criminals or drug lords. He was one of the most well-known faces in the genre, along with Mario and Fernando Almada and was as well known and famous as they were. The IMDb lists him appearing in over a hundred and fifty films. After being absent from the industry since his last film in 2005, he was most recently seen in the 2007 Mexican TV show 'El Pantera'. He had also appeared in some minor soft porn movies.

Despite his extensive film career, he was one of the most elusive actors in the genre; there's almost no information on him on the Internet and printed media. During an interview in January, 2007 he expressed his interest in contending for the Mayor office of his native town of Parácuaro, Michoacán, under the left-wing Party of the Democratic Revolution, of which he was an active member. He died on 8 January 2018 at the age of 59 in Pharr, Texas, where he resided in his final years.

== Selected filmography ==
- Instructions Not Included (2013)
- El Pantera (TV) (2007)
- El Cártel de Zacatecas (also director) (2005)
- Desde el Infierno (also director) (2004)
- Cruz de Amapola (2003)
- A Calzón Quitado (also director) (2003)
- El Fin de los Arellano (2003)
- Cholos, la Ley del Barrio (2003)
- Tianguis, Ratas de la Ciudad (2003)
- Los Commandos (2002)
- Yo Soy La Ley Malandrines (2002)
- El Marihuano (also director) (2002)
- Sangre de Pandilleros (also director) (2002)
- El Rey del Secuestro (also director) (2002)
- El Bruto (also director) (2002)
- La Banda de los Panchitos 2 (2001)
- Duelo de Cabrones (also director) (2001)
- Malditos Violadores (also director) (2001)
- El Cholo y el Pachuco (2001)
- Los Narcos de la Sierra (also director) (2001)
- La Cheyenne Pesada (also director) (2000)
- Cholos Empericados (2000)
- El Último de los Cholos (2000)
- El Regreso de Camelia la Chicana (2000)
- Monjas Narcotraficantes (1999)
- Acosados por la Mafia (1999)
- La Fuga de Arizmendi 2 (1999)
- Peleas Salvajes (also director) (1998)
- Los 3 de la Sierra (1998)
- La Fuga de Arizmendi (1998)
- Violencia Policiaca (1997)
- La Cheyenne del Año (1997)
- Puños de Acero (1996)
- Escuadrón Aguila (also director) (1995)
- El Castrado (also director) (1995)
- El Asesino del Zodiaco (1993)
- Operación Narcóticos (1991)
- Cazador de Recompensas (1989)
- Grave Robbers (1989)
- Salvador (1986)
- La Leyenda del Manco (1987)
