= Yo no fui =

- Yo no fui CD cover

Studio album by Pedro Fernández
- Released: September 12, 2000
- Recorded: 2000
- Genre: Latin pop, Banda, Mariachi, Ranchera, Latin ballad
- Length: 50:15
- Language: Spanish
- Label: Universal Music Latino a división of Universal Music Latin Entertainment/Mercury
- Producer: Homero Patrón

Pedro Fernández chronology
Aventurero (1998)	Yo no fui (2000)	Mi cariño (2001)

Yo no fui (I didn't do it) is an album by Mexican singer Pedro Fernández. It was released on September 12, 2000. The album won the Latin Grammy Award for Best Ranchero Album in 2001.

== Track listing ==
No.	Title	Writer(s)	Length
1.	"El muro"	Nicolás Urquiza, Miguel Ángel Arévalo	3:12
2.	"Caprichosa"	Paco Michel	3:19
3.	"Yo no fui"	Consuelo Velázquez	4:53
4.	"Para bien o para mal"	J.M. Napoleón	3:49
5.	"Bésame, morenita"	Álvaro Dalmar	2:48
6.	"Una rosa para ti"	R. Leoncito Ramírez	3:04
7.	"Laberinto de pasión"	Jorge Avendaño	4:34
8.	"Sin tu amor"	D. Harris, D. Terry Jr.	3:40
9.	"Hoy"	Pedro Fernández	4:27
10.	"Delincuente juvenil"	R. Leoncito Ramírez	3:30
11.	"Cómo te extraño"	Antonio Cruz	3:10
12.	"Amor del alma (Delilah)"	L. Reed, Mason	3:49
13.	"El Luz (feat Dipsy)"	Bobby Caldwell	6:00
Total length:			50:15

== Personnel ==
Adapted from AllMusic.

- Guadalupe Alfaro – guitar
- Eduardo Arias – make-up
- Juan Manuel Arpero – trumpet
- Chris Bellman – mastering
- Alexis Carreon – viola
- Fernando de Santiago – guitar
- Pedro Fernández – lead vocals
- Stefanie Fife – cello
- Ramon Flores – trumpet
- Virginia Frazier – viola
- Ismael Gallegos – vocals
- Steve Gamberoni – assistant engineer
- Terry Glenny – violin
- Arturo Gutierrez – vocals
- Harry Kim – trumpet
- Bobby Korda – violin
- Joel Lish – viola
- Donald Markese – saxophone
- Arturo Medellin – art direction
- Doug Norwine – saxophone
- Homero Patron – accordion, arranger, keyboards, musical director, vocals
- Fernando Roldán – engineer
- Frank Rosato – engineer
- James Ross – viola
- Ramón Stagnaro – electric guitar
- Nancy Stein-Ross – cello
- David Stout – trombone
- Yolanda Tallavas – coordination
- Ricardo Trabulsi – photography

== Charts ==
Chart (2000)	Peak position
US Top Latin Albums (Billboard)	28
US Regional Mexican Albums (Billboard)	8

== Sales and certifications ==
Region	Certification	Certified units/sales
Chile (IFPI)	Gold	18,000
Mexico (AMPROFON)	Platinum+Gold	225,000^{^}
United States (RIAA)	Platinum (Latin)	100,000^{^}
^{^} Shipments figures based on certification alone.

== Accolades ==
Year	Awards ceremony	Award	Results
2001	Latin Grammy Awards	Best Ranchero Album	Won
