= Álex Fernández (singer) =

Mexican singer-songwriter (born 1993)

- Birth name: Alejandro Fernández Guinart
- Born: 4 November 1993 (age 31); Mexico City, Mexico
- Genres: Regional Mexican
- Occupations: Singer; songwriter
- Instruments: Vocals; piano
- Years active: 2018—present
- Labels: Sony Music

Alejandro Fernández Guinart (born 4 November 1993) is a Mexican singer and songwriter of regional Mexican music.

== Early life ==
Fernández is the son of fellow ranchera singer Alejandro Fernández. He has four siblings, including Camila. He is also the grandson of Vicente Fernández. Fernández has inherited the traditions of ranchera culture, especially from his father and grandfather, for years. Fernández has always stood out for his voice, an instrument that has matured over the years to follow in the footsteps of the Fernández dynasty. Likewise, he has developed skills playing the piano, without neglecting his ability to compose. His first opportunity came from his grandfather, Vicente Fernández, who, upon hearing him sing, gave him the support to produce a music album.

== Career ==
Fernández began his musical career in 2018 with the release of his single Te Amaré written by Manuel Monterrosas. In 2019 he was nominated for Best Regional Song and Best Ranchero/Mariachi Album at the 20th Annual Latin Grammy Awards. At the ceremony he performed his song Te Amaré, and shared the stage with his father and grandfather, singing a duet of the song "Volver, volver". In 2019, Fernández released his first album Sigue la Dinastía under the musical direction of his grandfather Vicente Fernández who chose eight of the eleven songs that make up the studio album. In 2021, he accompanied his father Alejandro Fernández on his Hecho en México tour.

== Personal life ==
Fernández owns a bakery located in Zapopan, Jalisco.

After 10 years of relationship, he married his girlfriend Alexia Hernández on 14 May 2021. On 14 September 2021, the couple announced that they were expecting their first child. Through his Instagram account, the singer announced that he and his wife were expecting a girl. On March 17, 2022, their daughter Mía was born.

== Discography ==
- 2019: Sigue la Dinastía
- 2022: Buscando el Olvido

== Awards and nominations ==
Year	Awards	Category	Result
2019	Premios Juventud	Regional Roots 2.0 (Best Regional Mexican Artist)	Nominated
2019	Latin Grammy	Best Ranchero/Mariachi Album	Nominated
2019	Latin Grammy	Best Regional Song	Nominated
2020	Premio Lo Nuestro	New Artist – Male	Nominated
2020	Premio Lo Nuestro	Regional Mexican Mariachi Song of the Year	Nominated
2020	Premios Juventud	The New Regional Mexican Generation	Nominated
2021	Premios Juventud	Best Mariachi Song - Ranchera	Nominated
