= La niña de la mochila azul =

- Poster of the movie
- Directed by: Rubén Galindo
- Written by: Rubén Galindo, Carlos Valdemar
- Produced by: Daniel Galindo, Pedro Galindo
- Starring: Adalberto Martínez "Resortes", Pedro Fernández (billed as Pedrito Fernández); María Rebeca; Mónica Prado
- Music by: Soundtrack: La de la Mochila Azul Performed by Pedro Fernández and written by Bulmaro Bermúdez
- Distributed by: Filmadora Chapultepec
- Release date: October 18, 1979
- Running time: 85 minutes
- Country: Mexico
- Language: Spanish

La niña de la mochila azul (in English: The girl with the blue backpack) is a 1979 drama and musical comedy Mexican film, written and directed by Rubén Galindo and starring Adalberto Martínez «Resortes», Pedro Fernández, María Rebeca and Mónica Prado.

This movie is based on the song La de la Mochila Azul from the album by the same name, performed by Pedrito Fernández.

This was the first film starred in by Pedro Fernández credited as Pedrito Fernández when he was a child. At age seven, prior to the making of the movie, Pedro recorded La de la Mochila Azul and the success of that song was so great that he came to star in the subsequent iconic film. That song became the title track of this movie and a long distinguished career as an actor and singer continued.

This movie became an immediate success and resulted in a continuation with the La niña de la mochila azul 2 (1981). Both films also starred the popular comedian Adalberto Martínez "Resortes" as Uncle Andrew, María Rebeca as Amy, the girl with the blue backpack and Mónica Prado as Elena, Mother of Raúl García Colmenares. The popular song is still requested by fans at Pedro Fernández concerts today and the movie is still popular as a classic. Filmed near the infamous cascadas in Muzquiz, Coahuila - El Oasis Del Norte.

== Synopsis ==
A charming family film about first love. Amy (María Rebeca) and her friend Raul García Palomares (Pedrito Fernández) live in a fishing village in Texas. Raul falls in love with Amy, an orphaned child living with her uncle Andrew (Adalberto Martínez "Resortes") who, despite being a drunkard, has been a father figure to her. However, the poor conditions in which Amy lives lead local authorities to try to separate them. A serious accident at sea will change the life of Amy, Andrew, and Raul, whose goodness will be the key to Amy's happiness.

== Cast ==
- Adalberto Martínez "Resortes" as Uncle Andrew
- Pedrito Fernández as Raúl
- María Rebeca as Amy
- Mónica Prado as Elena, Mother of Raúl
- Mario Cid as Fernando, Father of Raúl
- Federico Falcón as El Oso
- José Luis Estrada
- Janet Mass
- Irma Lozano
- Marco Antonio Campos as Viruta
- Severiano Juárez (Second Character)
