= Cachito de cielo =

Mexican telenovela

- Maite Perroni and Pedro Fernández
- Genre: Telenovela; Romance; Drama; Comedy
- Created by: Mario Schajris
- Written by: Aída Guajardo; Berenice Cárdenas
- Directed by: Eric Morales; Alejandro Gamboa
- Starring: Pedro Fernández; Maite Perroni
- Theme music composer: Pedro Fernández
- Opening theme: "Cachito de Cielo" performed by Pedro Fernández
- Country of origin: Mexico
- Original language: Spanish
- No. of episodes: 110

Production
- Executive producers: Giselle González; Roberto Gómez Fernández
- Cinematography: Manuel Barajas; Luis Rodríguez
- Editor: Juan Franco
- Running time: 41-44 minutes
- Production company: Televisa

Original release
- Network: Canal de las Estrellas
- Release: June 11 – November 9, 2012

Cachito de Cielo (English title: Sent from Heaven) is a Mexican telenovela produced by Giselle González and Roberto Gómez Fernández for Televisa. It premiered on Canal de las Estrellas on June 11, 2012. Due to the controversy surrounding the show regarding religion, and low ratings in Mexico, Cachito de Cielo concluded on November 9, 2012.

Maite Perroni and Pedro Fernández star as the protagonists, while Rafael Inclán, Jorge Poza, and Esmeralda Pimentel are antagonists.

In the United States, Univision aired Cachito de Cielo from July 22, 2013 to December 20, 2013.

== Plot ==
Renata Landeros de Franco (Maite Perroni) is a young journalist who is in love with Adrian Gomes "Cachito" (Mane de la Parra). Both of them are happy until Cachito seems to die in a soccer match by getting hit by lightning. The problem is that Cachito was not scheduled to die, but an error of the angels (who misread Gomez for Gomes) results in Cachito's spirit being harvested prematurely. Thus the angels need to send Cachito back to earth to live his earthly life; yet the body of Cachito is no longer usable. Thus Cachito is reincarnated in an available body, that of a priest, Salvador Santillán "Padre Chava" (Pedro Fernández). Cachito resumes his reincarnated life as a new priest of the parish in which his family lived. Cachito-Salvador must pursue Renata, since he is in love with her, though he has been forbidden by the angels to do so. Thus a conflict ensues between Cachito-Salvador and the meddling angels.

== Cast ==
Actor	Character
Pedro Fernández	Padre Salvador Santillán / Adrián Gómez Obregón "Cachito"
Maite Perroni	Renata Landeros De Franco
Cynthia Klitbo	Adela Silva de Salazar "Pachi"
Jorge Poza	Fabio Montenegro
Azela Robinson	Teresa De Franco de Landeros "Teté"
Cecilia Gabriela	Isabel Obregón Vda. de Gómez
César Bono	Lucas
Juan Carlos Barreto	Tristán Luna
Raquel Pankoswky	Coca Obregon
Adalberto Parra	Reynaldo Salazar
Eduardo España	Ariel
Juan Carlos Colombo	Ezequiel
Otto Sirgo	Gustavo Mendiola
Esmeralda Pimentel	Mara Magaña
Pablo Lyle	Matías Salazar Silva / Matías Landeros Silva
Sofía Castro	Sofía Salvatierra
Anahí Allué	María del Pilar "Pili"
Ariane Pellicer	Orfe
José Ángel Bichir	Guillermo "Memo"
Alfredo Gatica	Darío Fernández
Elizabeth Valdez	Diana Gomes Obregon
Claudio Rocca	Alfonso "Poncho" Núñez
Adriana Goss	Gabriela "Gaby"
Gema Cuevas	Gema
Rafael Inclán	Ernesto Landeros "Pupi"

=== Special participation ===
Actor	Character
Mané de la Parra	Adrián Gómez Obregón "Cachito"
Jessica Mas	Sonia Serrano
Adanely Núñez	Julia
Jana Raluy	La Beauty
Gabriela Zamora	Dora

== Production ==
Production of Cachito de Cielo officially started on April 10, 2012.

== Awards and nominations ==
Year	Association	Category	Nominated	Result
2013	31st TVyNovelas Awards	Best Young Lead Actress	Esmeralda Pimentel	Nominated
2013	31st TVyNovelas Awards	Best Young Lead Actor	Pablo Lyle	Nominated
2013	31st TVyNovelas Awards	Best Female Revelation	Sofía Castro	Nominated
2013	Los Favoritos del público	Favorite Telenovela	Cachito de Cielo	Nominated
2013	Los Favoritos del público	Favorite couple	Maite Perroni and Pedro Fernández	Nominated
2013	Los Favoritos del público	The Most Beautiful Women	Maite Perroni	Nominated
2013	Los Favoritos del público	Favorite Kiss	Maite Perroni and Pedro Fernández	Nominated
2013	Los Favoritos del público	Favorite Finale	Cachito de Cielo	Nominated
