= Pedro Fernández (singer) =

Mexican singer, songwriter, actor, and television host

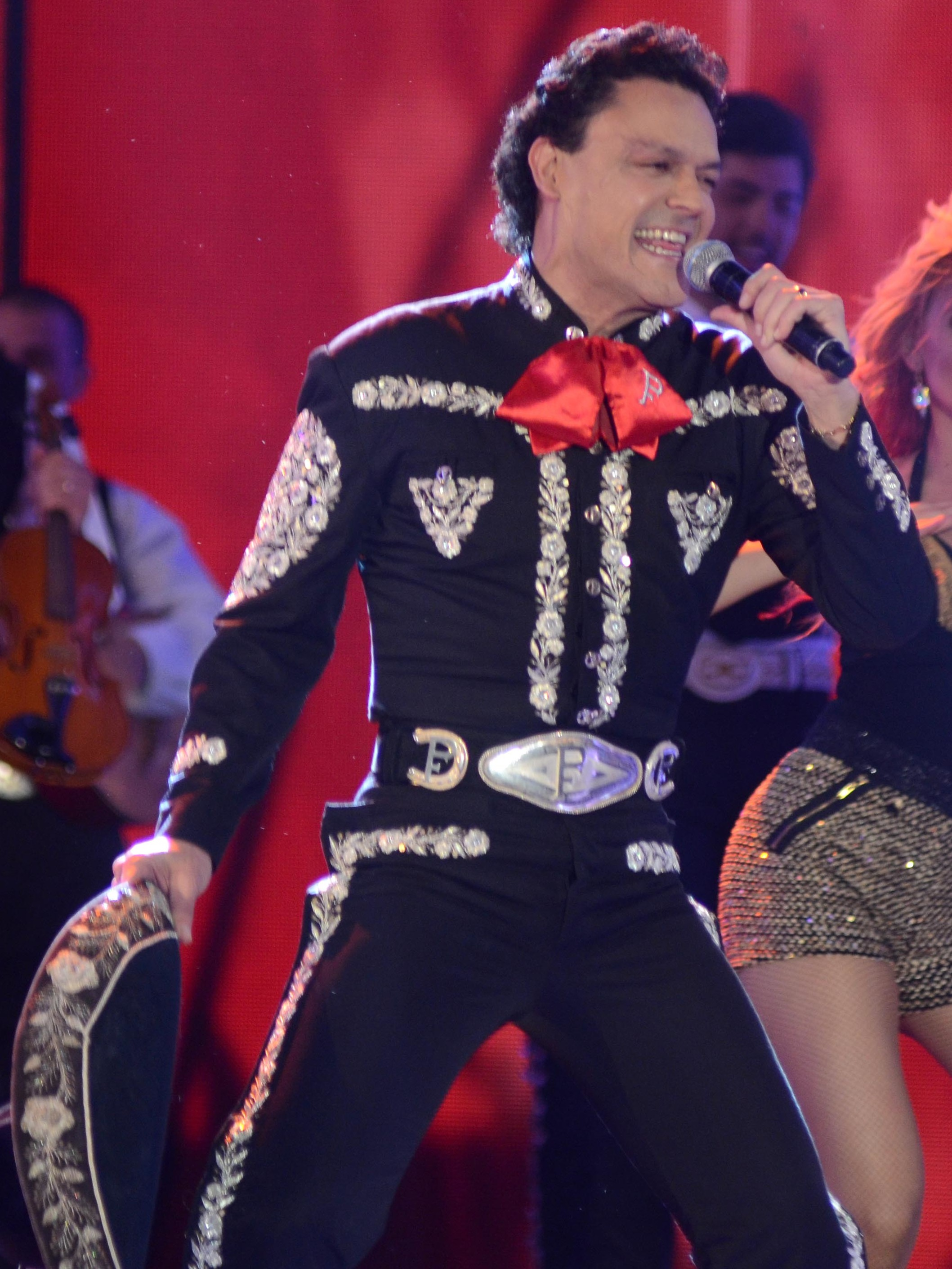
- Fernández in 2014

Background information
- Also known as: Pedrito Fernández
- Born: José Martín Cuevas Cobos; September 28, 1969 (age 57); Guadalajara, Jalisco, Mexico.
- Origin: Mexíco
- Genres: Regional Mexican, Latin pop
- Occupations: Singer; actor; songwriter; composer; producer; TV host
- Instruments: Vocals; guitar; piano
- Years active: 1976–present
- Website: Pedro Fernández Oficial

José Martín Cuevas Cobos (born September 28, 1969), known by his stage name Pedro Fernández, is a Mexican singer, songwriter, actor, and television host. Fernández began his international career as Pedrito Fernández at the age of seven. In the 1980s, he turned to be known as a scream king, thanks to his horror film starring roles in films such as Vacaciones de terror (1989), Pánico en la montaña (1989) and Trampa Infernal (1989).

Fernández has recorded thirty-nine albums, acted in seven soap operas, and twenty five films. He has won 4 Latin Grammy Awards. His stage name is composed of the names of two of his favorite singers, Pedro (Infante) and (Vicente) Fernandez, the latter of whom was his godfather. Vicente Fernández also gifted Fernández his first Traje de Charro (charro suit), which he wore on the cover of his debut album, La de la Mochila Azul.

== Early life ==
His first album, La de la Mochila Azul, named after the single, was released in 1978. His starring role in the film La niña de la mochila azul (The Girl with the Blue Backpack) was released in 1979 and led to a lifetime career of recording and film contracts.

== Career ==
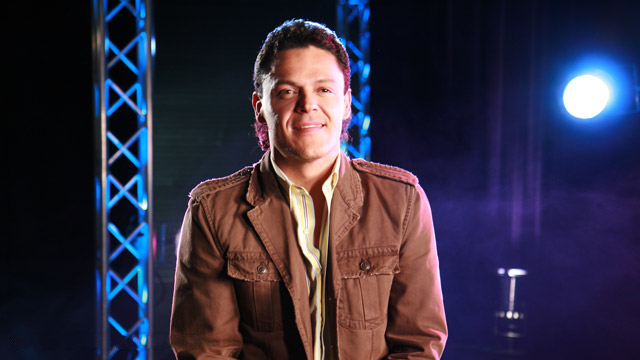
Pedro Fernandez.

In 2001, his album Yo No Fui won the Latin Grammy Award for Best Ranchero Album.

His album De Corazón was nominated for the Latin Grammy Award for Best Ranchero/Mariachi Album at the 2003 Latin Grammy Awards.

In 2009, Fernández starred in Televisa's telenovela Hasta que el dinero nos separe with actress and singer Itatí Cantoral. He won the TVyNovelas Award for Best Lead Actor of 2010 for his portrayal of "Rafael Medina Nuñez" in the telenovela. The couple took home a triumph as Best Couple of the Year and Best Telenovela.

In 2010, Fernández won the Latin Grammy Award for Best Regional Mexican Song (2010) for "Amarte a la Antigua",

In 2012, Fernández starred as the protagonist in the telenovela Cachito de cielo. Fernández wrote the theme song "Cachito de Cielo" for the telenovela and as the theme song's songwriter and performer, he won the Latin Grammy Award for Best Regional Mexican Song in 2013.

In July 2014, Fernández starred in the Mexican telenovela Hasta el fin del mundo produced by Televisa. Fernández also wrote and performed the theme song for the series and produced an album by the name Hasta El Fin Del Mundo.

In 2015, his album Acaríciame El Corazón won the Latin Grammy Award for Best Ranchero/Mariachi Album at the 16th Annual Latin Grammy Awards. Fernández appeared on TV as a team coach for La Voz Kids for seasons three (2015) and four (2016), and as an official presenter/host for the Billboard Latin Music Awards for 2015 and 2016.

In September 2016, Fernández collaborated with Grupo Cañaveral for their 20-year anniversary album, recording a Cumbia version of Fernández's song "Si Te Vas".

The Honduran paper La Prensa has called Fernández "one of the most recognized artists not only in Mexico but throughout Latin America for his music and acting which continues today".

In November 2017, Fernández recorded “El Mudo” with La Sonora Santanera on their Latin Grammy nominated album “La Fiesta Continúa”.

2018 was an eventful year for Fernández. This year he began celebrating 40 years of his artistic career with a year of concerts and television appearances. In February he was named “Mr. Amigo”. Each year, the Mr. Amigo Association honors a Mexican citizen to promote international friendship and goodwill between the U.S. and Mexico.

In March, Fernández released the first single titled from his upcoming new album Arránquense Muchachos. March also saw the release of “Toquen Mariachis Canten” (En Vivo), a duet Fernández recorded with Leo Dan for his new album “Celebrando a una Leyenda” (En Vivo).

In May, Fernández recorded another duet “Un Millón De Rosas” with the Grammy winning Tejano Group, La Mafia on their new album “Vozes”.

July brought the release of “Como Ella”, the second single from his new album Arránquense Muchachos. In August the complete album was released.

In September, the title cut from the album ¡Arránquense Muchachos¡ was nominated by the 19th Annual Latin Grammy Awards for Best Regional Song.

In 2019, along with the continuation of his multi-country “40th Anniversary Tour”, Fernández was selected to perform the opening theme “Como Te Extraño Mi Amor” for the Telemundo new political drama Preso No. 1 an American political thriller television series produced by Keshet International and Telemundo Global Studios which premiered on July 30, 2019. On August 30, 2019, Spanish singer Natalia Jiménez released her album “México De Mi Corazón” (Mexico of my heart), that includes a duet with Fernández, “Ya Lo Sé Que Tú Te Vas” (I know that you are leaving).

In March 2020, Fernández released the cover for his upcoming 40th album with a single titled “Como Te Extraño Mi Amor” (How I miss you my love), written by Leo Dan and encouraged by the popularity of his shorter version performed by Fernández for the theme of the Telemundo political drama Preso No. 1 last year.

In 2021 Fernández takes the lead role as the title character in Malverde: El Santo Patrón, an American biographical-drama television series based on the life of the Mexican bandit Jesús Malverde. Produced by Telemundo Global Studios.

== Awards ==
Among his many national and international awards over his long career Pedro Fernández has been awarded the TVyNovelas Award for Best Actor (2010) for Hasta Que el Dinero Nos Separe, Latin Grammy Award for Best Ranchero/Mariachi Album (2001) for Yo No Fui, Latin Grammy Award for Best Regional Mexican Song (2010) for "Amarte a la Antigua", Latin Grammy Award for Best Regional Mexican Song (2013) (writer and performer) for "Cachito de Cielo", and the Latin Grammy Award for Best Ranchero/Mariachi Album (2015) for Acaríciame El Corazón.

== Discography ==
=== as Pedrito Fernández ===
- La de la Mochila Azul (1978)
- Mamá Solita (1979)
- La Mugrosita (1980)
- Guadalajara (1981)
- Mis 9 Años (1981)
- La de los Hoyitos (1982)
- Ay Jalisco no te rajes (1982)
- Rosa María (1982)
- Pucheritos (1983)
- Coqueta (1983)
- Delincuente (1984)
- Es Un Sábado Más (1985)
- El mejor de Todos (1986)

=== as Pedro Fernández ===
- Querida Canciones de Juan Gabriel (1987)
- Vicio (1989)
- Vacaciones de terror (1989)
- Por Un Amigo Más (1990)
- Muñecos de Papel (1991)
- Lo Mucho Que Te Quiero (1993)
- Buscando el Paraíso (1993)
- Mi Forma De Sentir (1994)
- Pedro Fernández (1995)
- Deseos Y Delirios (1996)
- Un Mundo Raro: Tributo a José Alfredo Jiménez (1997)
- Aventurero (1998)
- Laberintos de Pasión (1999)
- Lo Más Romántico de Pedro Fernández (1999)
- Yo No Fuí (2000)
- Mi Cariño (2001)
- De Corazón (2002)
- Escúchame (2006)
- Dime Mi Amor (2008)
- Amarte a la Antigua (2009)
- Hasta Que el Dinero Nos Separe (2010)
- No Que No... (2012)
- No Que No edición especial (2012)
- Hasta el Fin del Mundo (2014)
- Acaríciame El Corazón (2015)
- ¡Arránquense Muchachos! (2018)

== Filmography ==
=== Films ===
Year	Title	Role	Notes
1979	La niña de la mochila azul	Raúl García Palomares	Credited as Pedrito Fernández
1980	Amigo	Poncho	Also known as Forja de amigos
1980	El oreja rajada	Julián	
1980	Mamá sólita		Credited as Pedrito Fernández
1981	La niña de la mochila azul 2	Raúl García Palomares	Credited as Pedrito Fernández
1981	Allá en la plaza Garibaldi	Julio	
1982	La Mugrosita	Andrés	Credited as Pedrito Fernández
1982	La niña de los hoyitos	Ferco	Credited as Pedrito Fernández
1983	Los dos carnales	Pablito	
1983	Niño pobre, niño rico		Mario y el niño chico es Pepe
1983	Coqueta	Pablo	Credited as Pedrito Fernández
1984	Delincuente	Alejandro	
1985	Un sábado más	Martín	
1986	Como Si Fueramos Novios	Andresito	
1988	Vacaciones de terror	Julio	
1989	Pánico en la montaña	Pedro	
1989	Había una vez una estrella	Rodrigo	
1990	Un corazón para dos	Bernardo	
1990	Trampa infernal	Nacho	
1991	Vacaciones de terror 2	Julio	
1992	El ganador		
1992	Crónica de un crimen	Alex Kamper	
1992	Comando de federales 2	Puma	
1993	Las mil y una aventuras del metro		
1993	Derecho de asilo		

=== Television ===
Year	Title	Role	Notes
1985	Juana Iris	Juan Bernardo	
1987–1988	Tal como somos	Valerio Cisneros	
1991	Alcanzar una estrella II	Jorge Puente	100 episodes
1993–1994	Buscando el paraíso	Julio Flores	100 episodes
1999–2000	Laberintos de pasión	Himself	3 episodes
2009–2010	Hasta que el dinero nos separe	Rafael Medina	231 episodes
2012	Cachito de cielo	Father Salvador Santillán	110 episodes
2014	Hasta el fin del mundo	Salvador "Chava" Cruz # 1	80 episodes
2021	Malverde: El Santo Patrón	Jesús Malverde	Lead role

== See also ==
- List of Famous Mexicans
- Si Te Vas (Pedro Fernández song)
