= Si Te Vas (Pedro Fernández song) =

Single by Pedro Fernández

from the album Mi Forma De Sentir
- Released: 1995
- Recorded: 1994
- Genre: Ranchera
- Length: 4:05
- Label: PolyGram Latino
- Songwriter: Pedro Fernández
- Producer: Mariana Somonte

Pedro Fernández singles chronology
"Mi Forma de Sentir" (1994)	"Si Te Vas" (1995)	"Quién" (1995)

"Si Te Vas" ("If You Go") is a song written and performed by Mexican singer-songwriter Pedro Fernández. The song was released in 1995 as the second single from his album Mi Forma De Sentir (1994). The song was recognized by Broadcast Music, Inc. as one of the award winnings at the 1997 BMI Latin Awards.

== Grupo Cañaveral with Pedro Fernández duet version ==
In September 2016, Pedro Fernández collaborated with Grupo Cañaveral for their upcoming 20-year anniversary album. The recording took place at the well-known Ragga Primitive Freedom bar in Plaza Antara, in Polanco, where the group, led by Humberto and Emir Pabón, accompanied by Pedro Fernández, recorded the song "Si Te Vas", authored by Pedro and now with a cumbia twist.

The album was released 27 January 2017 and is titled Fiesta Total by Grupo Cañaveral de Humberto Pabón and features the latest version of "Si Te Vas" by Pedro Fernández.

== Weekly charts ==
Chart (1994)	Position
US Hot Latin Songs (Billboard)	20

== Marc Anthony version ==
"Si Te Vas"

Single by Marc Anthony

from the album Contra la Corriente
- Released: 1998
- Recorded: 1997
- Genre: Salsa
- Length: 4:48
- Label: RMM
- Songwriter: Pedro Fernández
- Producer: Ángel "Cucco" Peña

Marc Anthony singles chronology
"Me Voy a Regalar" (1997)	"Si Te Vas" (1998)	"No Me Conoces" (1998)

In 1997, American singer Marc Anthony covered "Si Te Vas" on his third studio album Contra la Corriente. The song became his ninth number-one song on the Latin Tropical Airplay chart. Fernández received another BMI Latin Award in 1999 for Anthony's version of the song.

=== Charts ===
==== Weekly charts ====
Chart (1998)	Position
US Hot Latin Songs (Billboard)	8
US Tropical Airplay (Billboard)	1

==== Year-end charts ====
Chart (1998)	Peak position
US Billboard Hot Latin Songs	18
US Billboard Tropical Songs	3

== See also ==
- List of Billboard Tropical Airplay number ones of 1998
