= Coqueta (1983 film) =

1983 film by Sergio Véjar

- Poster
- Directed by: Sergio Vejar
- Written by: Kiki Galindo
- Produced by: Daniel Galindo
- Starring: Lucero; Pedro Fernández; Rodolfo Gómez; Sergio Gómez
- Cinematography: Miguel Arana
- Music by: Jonathan Zarzosa
- Distributed by: Televicine
- Release date: 1983
- Country: Mexico
- Language: Spanish

Coqueta (in English: Coquette) is a 1983 Mexican musical drama film, directed by Sergio Vejar and starring Lucero.

== Plot ==
It tells the story of Rocío (Lucerito aka Lucero), an optimistic adolescent, who finds true love in Pablo (Pedrito Fernández aka Pedro Fernández). However, the innocent love of this pair is destroyed when Roció faints at her birthday party, which leads to the diagnosis of a grave heart defect. In desperation, due to the possibility of losing his beloved Roció, Pablo tries to hide his sadness, and show great bravery for the well-being of the girl he adores.

== Cast ==
- Lucero as Rocío
- Pedro Fernández as Pablo
- Rodolfo Gómez as Ricardo
- Sergio Gómez as Luis
- Antonio de Hud as Juan
- Lucero León as Mother of Pablo

== Promotion ==
This movie was promoted for Mexico and Latin Countries. After its release was promoted through television.
