= Amarte a la Antigua =

Studio album by Pedro Fernández
- Released: October 20, 2009
- Recorded: 2009
- Genres: Latin pop, Banda, Mariachi, Latin ballad
- Language: Spanish
- Label: Fonovisa

Pedro Fernández chronology
Dime Mi Amor (2008)	Amarte a la Antigua (2009)	Hasta Que el Dinero Nos Separe (2010)

Amarte a la Antigua (To Love You in the Old Fashioned-Way) is an album by Mexican recording artist Pedro Fernández, released by Fonovisa Records on October 20, 2009. The album received a Latin Grammy Award nomination for Best Ranchero Album. The title song was the closing theme song of the award-winning telenovela Hasta que el dinero nos separe which won Fernández the TVyNovelas Award for Best Actor. The title song also won the Latin Grammy Award for Best Regional Mexican Song (2010) for "Amarte a la Antigua", The popular video performance of the titled theme song is also from the telenovela.

== Critical reception ==
Professional ratings
Review scores
Source	Rating
Allmusic	3.5/5 stars

Alex Henderson of allmusic gave the album a mostly positive review, citing that Fernandez "enjoys variety" and said the album is "likable".

== Track listing ==
No.	Title	Composer(s)	Length
1.	"Amarte a la Antigua"	Yoel Enriquez, Paco Lugo	3:38
2.	"Dile a las Estrellas"	Karina Cuevas	3:19
3.	"Ni con Otro Corazón" (Banda Version)	Juan Diego Sandoval Macías, Juan José Leyva Higuera	3:15
4.	"Te Necesito"	Gilberto Gless	4:03
5.	"Se Me Va a Pasar"	Ariel Barreras	3:37
6.	"Celosa"	Ismael Gallegos, Javier Rangel	3:03
7.	"Déjame"	Jaime Flores Monterrubio, José Juan Monroy Díaz, Raúl Ornelas Toledo	4:00
8.	"Lo Que Me Gusta" (Banda Version)	Macías, Higuera	3:10
9.	"Ay Corazón"	Pedro Fernández	4:08
10.	"No Quiero Olvidar"	Karina Cuevas	3:25
11.	"El Cantante" (Banda Version)	Miguel Angel Noriega	2:16
12.	"Hasta Que el Dinero Nos Separe"	Pedro Fernández	3:27

Bonus track
No.	Title	Composer(s)	Length
13.	"Chiqui, Chiqui"	Gless	3:54

== Charts ==
=== Weekly charts ===
Chart (2009)	Peak position
Mexican Albums (AMPROFON)	8
Chart (2010)	Peak position
US Billboard 200	141
US Top Latin Albums (Billboard)	2
US Regional Mexican Albums (Billboard)	1

=== Year-end charts ===
Chart (2010)	Position
US Top Latin Albums (Billboard)	9

== Certifications ==
Region	Certification	Certified units/sales
Mexico (AMPROFON)	Platinum+Gold	90,000^{^}
^{^} Shipments figures based on certification alone.
