= Trio Ellas =

American music group

Trio Ellas is an all-female Latin-American music group formed in 2006 and based in Los Angeles, California by Stephanie Amaro de Abad, Nelly Cortez and Suemy Gonzalez. The group mixes traditional mariachi music with classic romantic trio, jazz, country and other styles. The trio wear Mariachi pants, instead of skirts, and wear stilettos, performing in Spanish and English. Their performances do not follow any traditional structure. Their influences include Los Tres Ases, Los Dandies, and Los Panchos.

== History ==
Trio Ellas’ career began by performing “out of necessity” at a restaurant in Pasadena, California. These performances allowed them to collect tips by performing on a weekly basis. In May 2012 Trio Ellas released their debut album Con Ustedes...Trio Ellas which contains cover versions of songs including Besame Mucho, Ojala Que Llueva Cafe and Odiame. In the same year, the group completed a tour of Okinawa for USO in Japan, performed at the annual League of United Latin American Citizens (LULAC) conventions in Orlando, Florida and San Antonio, Texas. In North Carolina, Trio Ellas performed at the "Latinos Unidos" event at Democratic National Convention (DNC). In the summer of 2012, Trio Ellas also participated in a two-week run at the Hollywood Bowl's "Summer Sounds" children's program. The group also performed at the San Jose Latin Music Festival in 2012. The first album of the group was nominated for a Latin Grammy under the category of Best Ranchero Album in September 2012.

The trio have performed with as Cristian Castro, Lady Gaga (“Americano”), Benjamin Gibbard and Mariachi El Bronx the alter ego of The Bronx band. They performed “Something’s Rattling”, a song recorded with Benjamin Gibbard live on the Conan O'Brien show.

== Members ==
All three of trio sing. Stephanie Amaro de Abad plays guitar; Nelly Cortez plays guitarron and vocals; Suemy Gonzalez, a graduate from USC's Thornton School of Music, plays violin. Amaro de Abad and Gonzalez met while performing in other all-male, except for them, mariachi ensembles. Amaro de Abad was part of a group called “Alma De Mi Tierra” with Gonzalez. Cortez, being a fourth generation mariachi musician, grew up listening to Mariachi music and seeing family members, male family members, participate in it. Gonzalez started playing violin at age 5, and began to play mariachi music at age 12, encouraged by her mother. After attending a music festival in San Jose, California, she began to perform it in local groups in Sacramento, California. Amaro de Abad started at age 19. After seeing a professional mariachi show group, she started performing mariachi. Her father was a musician, but Mariachi music was not commonly heard in the home.

=== Discography ===
- 2012 Con Ustedes...Trio Ellas
