= Artistic swimming at the 2022 South American Games =

Artistic swimming competitions at the 2022 South American Games

- Venue: Centro Acuático Nacional
- Dates: October 7−9
- Nations: 7

Artistic swimming competitions at the 2022 South American Games in Asunción, Paraguay are scheduled to be held between October 7 and 9, 2022 at the Centro Acuático Nacional.

A women's team and duet competition was contested. A total of seven NOC's entered teams into one or both competitions. The top two teams in each event qualified for the 2023 Pan American Games Artistic swimming competitions (duet and team), along with the host nation Chile. The two best countries in the duet not qualified in the team event also qualifying their pair for the games.

== Medal summary ==
=== Medal table ===
* Host nation (Paraguay)

Rank	Nation	Gold	Silver	Bronze	Total
1	Brazil (BRA)	2	0	0	2
2	Colombia (COL)	0	2	0	2
3	Chile (CHI)	0	0	2	2
Totals (3 entries)		2	2	2	6

=== Medalists ===
Event	Gold	Silver	Bronze
Duet routine	Jullia Soares; Laura Miccuci; Brazil	Estefanía Roa; Melisa Ceballos; Colombia	Soledad García; Trinidad García; Chile
Team routine	Ana Nunes; Anna Veloso; Celina Rangel; Gabriela Teixeira; Jullia Soares; Laura Miccuci; Luiza Rodrigues; Luiza dos Santos; Vitoria Casale; Brazil	Estefanía Roa; Isabella Franco; Jennifer Cerquera; Jhoselyne Taborda; Kerly Barrera; Laura Marquez; Melisa Ceballos; Mónica Arango; Valentina Orozco; Colombia	Antonia Mella; Fiona Prieto; Isidora Letelier; Josefa Morales; Rocio Vargas; Soledad García; Theodora Garrido; Trinidad García; Valentina Valdivia; Chile

== Results ==
=== Team ===
Rank	Nation	Swimmers	Technical Routine		Free Routine		Total
Rank	Nation	Swimmers	Points	Rank	Points	Rank	Points
1st place, gold medalist(s)	Brazil	Ana Nunes; Anna Veloso; Celina Rangel; Gabriela Teixeira; Jullia Soares; Laura Miccuci; Luiza Rodrigues; Luiza dos Santos; Vitoria Casale	78.6411	1	81.6667	1	160.3078
2nd place, silver medalist(s)	Colombia	Estefanía Roa; Isabella Franco; Jennifer Cerquera; Jhoselyne Taborda; Kerly Barrera; Laura Marquez; Melisa Ceballos; Mónica Arango; Valentina Orozco	76.8773	2	79.0333	2	155.9106
3rd place, bronze medalist(s)	Chile	Antonia Mella; Fiona Prieto; Isidora Letelier; Josefa Morales; Rocio Vargas; Soledad García; Theodora Garrido; Trinidad García; Valentina Valdivia	75.4101	3	77.8000	3	153.2101
4	Argentina	Catalina Pineda; Eleonora Dao; Guadalupe García; Luisina Caussi; Morena Ferrer; Sofía Migliaccio; Tiziana Bonucci; Valentina Marchetti; Zoe Candela	73.8475	4	75.5333	4	149.3808
5	Peru	Adriana Toulier; Ariana Coronado; Camila Fernandez; Fabiana Choy; Lia Luna; María José Coyllo; Mariafe López; Marysabel Medina; Sandy Quiroz	71.2481	5	73.0333	5	144.2814
