= Acaríciame el corazón =

Acaríciame El Corazón
- Acaríciame El Corazón CD cover

Studio album by Pedro Fernández
- Released: May 12, 2015
- Recorded: 2015
- Genres: Latin pop, Banda, Mariachi, Ranchera, Latin ballad
- Length: 48:21
- Language: Spanish
- Label: Fonovisa a division of Universal Music Latin Entertainment
- Director: Jorge Avendaño
- Producer: Pedro Fernández

Pedro Fernández chronology
Hasta el fin del mundo (2014)	Acaríciame El Corazón (2015)

Acaríciame El Corazón (Caress My Heart) is a studio album by Mexican recording artist Pedro Fernández, released by Fonovisa Records on May 12, 2015.

The album won the Latin Grammy Award for Best Ranchero/Mariachi Album in 2015 at the 16th Annual Latin Grammy Awards. Pedro Fernández composed five of the songs on this album including the title track and he is also the album's executive producer.

Acaríciame El Corazón includes ballads, rhythmic songs and rancheras, and is "very close" to "Hasta el fin del mundo" (2014), explained the artist in an interview with international media.

"Presenting a new album always fills me with hope, enthusiasm and commitment to the public, which in some way or another has followed me during the 38 years of my career," Fernández said.

Produced "with much affection" along with Jorge Avendaño, the album "can fulfill all the tastes" of his followers thanks to the variety of styles, Fernández states.

== Background ==
Fernández said his new production will be "completely different" because among its fourteen songs it includes one song previously unreleased, two songs each with two versions in banda style and five videos, as well as an artistic renewal.

Being a CD + DVD it has two songs with alternate versions in Banda style. The single "Si Tuviera Que Decirlo" (If I had to say it), as well as five videos that were filmed at Rancho La Fortaleza located in Nuevo León México.

In the song, "Si Tuviera Que Decirlo" (If I had to say it), about love, Fernández adopts the romantic aspect that has characterized his artistic career, with lyrics such as: "If I had to say it, I would like to say I love you, you are the greatest thing in my life, you are the air I breathe".

"All my albums are very inclined to the romantic part, but without leaving aside the rhythmic and mischievous part that the public always likes," he added.

In that sense, Fernández detailed that songs such as El Tao Tao, the unpublished Carmen or the banda version of “El Facilito”, a song that he considered "very entertaining and very funny", respond to this most mischievous character.

The album also features two versions of "Duele Ver" (It hurts to see), one of them recorded in the Banda genre, "it is always important to comply with this genre that has so much growth today," he said.

== Track listing ==
#	Title	Writer(s)	Length
1	"Hasta El Fin Del Mundo"	Pedro Fernández	3:32
2	"Si Tuviera Que Decirlo"	Pedro Fernández	4:12
3	"Debajo Del Sombrero"	Manuel Contero	3:10
4	"Se Me Perdió La Cadenita"	Luis Guillermo Perez Cedron	2:58
5	"Acaríciame El Corazón"	Pedro Fernández	4:17
6	"Duele Ver"	Jerry Demara	3:34
7	"El Facilito"	Joss Favela, Luciano Luna	2:35
8	"Para Perdernos"	Ariel Barreras	3:30
9	"Hoy En Esta Noche"	Pedro Fernández	3:34
10	"El Tao Tao"	Luis Guillermo Perez Cedron	2:32
11	"Ciegamente Enamorado"	Claudia Brant, Ramiro Terán	3:56
12	"Feliz Navidad, Amor"	Pedro Fernández	3:09
13	"Duele Ver" (Banda Version)	Jerry Demara	3:34
14	"Si Tuviera Que Decirlo" (Banda Version)	Pedro Fernández	3:49
