= María Rebeca =

Mexican actress (born 1970)

- Born: María Rebeca Zepeda Lozano; March 9, 1970 (age 55); Mexico City, D.F., Mexico
- Occupation: Actress
- Years active: 1979-present

María Rebeca (Latin American Spanish: [maˈɾia reˈβeka], born María Rebeca Zepeda Lozano on March 9, 1970, in Mexico City, D.F., Mexico) is a Mexican actress.

== Filmography ==
Telenovelas, Films, TV Show
Year	Title	Role	Notes
1979	El niño y el tiburón		
1979	La Tía Alejandra	Martha	Film
1979-80	Los Ricos También Lloran	María Isabel (childhood)	Special appearance
1980	La niña de la mochila azul	Amy	Film
1980	El ladrón fenomeno	Marianita	Film
1980	Tres de presidio	Gloria	Film
1980	El oreja rajada	Candy	Film
1981	La niña de la mochila azul 2	Amy	Film
1982	Visita al pasado	Rebeca	Film
1982	La mugrosita	María	Film
1983	La esperanza de los pobres		Film
1984	Gatilleros del Rio Bravo	Paty	Film
1984	Nosotros los pelados		Film
1985	El rey de la vecindad	La Petaquitas	Film
1985	Cementerio del terror	Anita	Film
1989	Pánico en la montaña	Rebeca Zepeda	Film
1989-90	Simplemente Maria	Paulina Mateos	Supporting role
1990	Calles sangrientas		Film
1990	Ciudad sin ley		Film
1990	Ladrones de tumbas	Diana Negrete	Film
1991	La negra flor		Film
1991	El teatro del horror	Karina Piamonte	Film
1991-92	Atrapada	Gloria	Supporting role
1992	Baila conmigo	Mary Jean (#2)	Supporting role
1992-93	Tenías que ser tú		1 Episode
1996	Mujer, casos de la vida real		1 Episode: El amor no se compara
1997	Al norte del corazón	Maribel	Supporting role
1998-99	Perla	Matilde	Supporting role
1999	Catalina y Sebastián	Emilia	Supporting role
2001	Me gusta pegarle al polvo		Film
2002	Mónica y el profesor	Monica	Film
2002	Ciudades oscuras	waitress	Film
2002	Sensacional	Herself/hostess	TV show
2004	Belinda	Cristina Romero	Supporting role
2008	Chiles Xalapeños	Mercedes	TV series
2008	Crepúsculo rojo	Esperanza	Film
2009-10	Pobre Diabla	Yadhira Soto	Supporting role
2011	Bajo el alma	Montserrat	Supporting role
