= Camila Fernández =

Mexican singer (born 1997)

- Fernández in the press room of the 27th Annual Latin Grammy Awards, 2026
- Born: Camila Fernández Guinart; November 30, 1997 (age 28); Guadalajara, Mexico
- Occupations: Singer; songwriter; dancer
- Years active: 2015-present
- Works: Discography; Singles; Collaborations
- Spouse: Francisco Barba
- Children: Cayetana
- Parent(s): Alejandro Fernández (father), América Guinart (mother)
- Relatives: Álex Fernández (brother), América Fernández (twin sister), Emiliano Fernández (half-brother), Valentina Fernández (half-sister), Vicente Fernández (grandfather), María Abarca (grandmother)

Camila Fernández Guinart (Note: In this Mexican name, the surname is Fernández and the second or maternal family name is Guinart.) (born November 30, 1997) is a Mexican singer, daughter and granddaughter respectively of singers Alejandro Fernández and Vicente Fernández. She is considered the third generation of one of Mexico's most iconic musical dynasties, known for fusing pop and R&B influences with mariachi and traditional Mexican music.

== Biography ==
Camila Fernández Guinart was born on November 30, 1997, in Guadalajara, Jalisco. She is the daughter of renowned Mexican singer Alejandro Fernández and América Guinart. Her paternal grandfather, Vicente Fernández, is an icon of ranchera music. She has an older brother, Alejandro Fernández Jr., known artistically as Álex Fernández, a twin sister América Fernández, and two younger half-siblings, Emiliano Fernández and Valentina Fernández, from her father's second relationship.

While an elementary school student in San Diego, California, Camila auditioned for the role of Motormouth Maybelle in the musical Hairspray, a turning point that sparked her passion for music, particularly R&B.

Camila later enrolled at the Semper Altius Music School in Guadalajara, where she trained in singing, violin, guitar, flute, ukulele, cajon, percussion, dance, ballet, theater and music theory. She also studied at the La Jolla Piano Institute in California and completed several courses at Berklee College of Music in Boston between 2013 and 2015.

== Musical career ==
On September 14, 2014, Camila made her debut as a singer alongside her father Alejandro Fernández at the MGM Grand Hotel & Casino in Las Vegas, performing the single "Hoy tengo ganas de ti". She made her first television appearance on November 9, 2014, alongside her father on the programme "Grandes temas de telenovela".

On her 18th birthday, November 30, 2015, she signed a contract with Universal Music Mexico.

In 2016 she collaborated on the album We Love Disney (Latino) with her father, performing "El ciclo sin fin" from The Lion King. That same year she performed at the Billboard Latin Music Awards. In 2017 she made a guest appearance on the Disney Channel series Soy Luna.

From 2022 onwards her career shifted toward Mexican regional music. She performed a memorable mariachi set at Corona Capital Guadalajara in 2022 and released a cover of "Amor Eterno". She also collaborated with Colombian band Morat on a mariachi version of "Debi Suponerlo", which brought her wider international attention.

In September 2024, she sang the Mexican National Anthem at the Canelo Álvarez boxing match.

== Discography ==
Studio albums

- 2022: ''Vulnerable''
- 2023: ''Camila Fernández''
- 2025: ''La Fernández''

EPs

- 2018: Mío

Singles

- 2017: El Niño Más Grande
- 2017: Mío
- 2018: El Hijo De La Inombrable
- 2023: Todo Todo

=== Collaborations ===
- 2016: "El ciclo sin fin" ft. Alejandro Fernández, from We Love Disney (Latino)
  - 2020: "Te ha pasado?" ft. Paty Cantú and Maria Del Pilar Pérez
  - 2020: "Blanca Navidad" ft. Alejandro, América and Valentina Fernández
  - 2021: "Un año más" ft. Daniel Boaventura
  - 2022: "Un poco de tu amor" ft. Moderatto
  - 2023: "Debi suponerlo" ft. Morat

=== Music videos ===
| Year | Title | Album |
|---|---|---|
| 2018 | El Hijo De La Innombrale | Mío - EP |
| 2017 | Mío | Mío - EP |
| 2016 | El Ciclo Sin Fin (Alejandro Fernández with Camila Fernández) | We Love Disney (Latino) |
