= Leo Dan =

Argentine composer and singer (1942–2025)

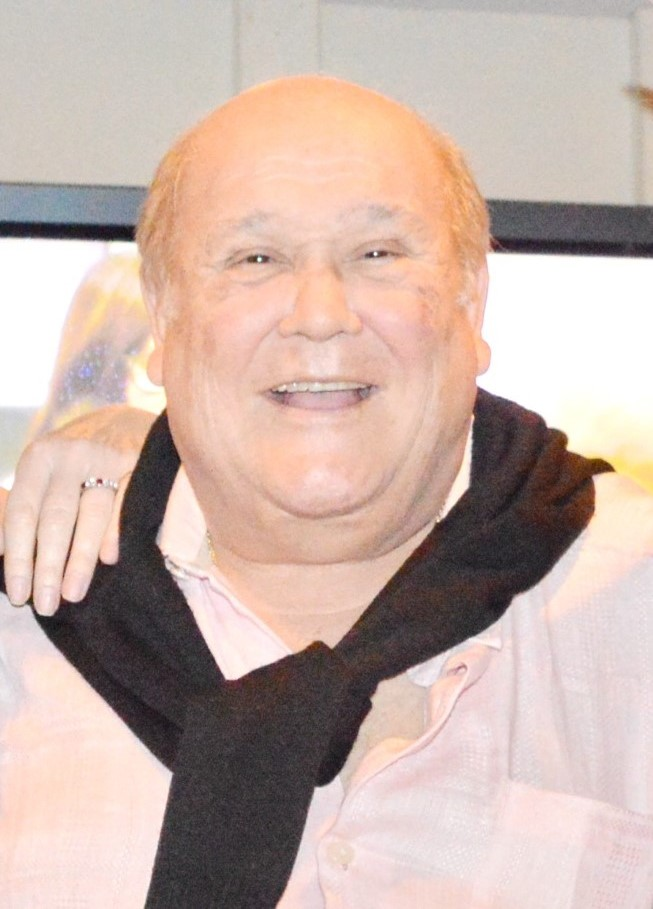
- Dan in 2014

Background information
- Born: Leopoldo Dante Tévez; March 22, 1942; Villa Atamisqui, Santiago del Estero Province, Argentina
- Died: January 1, 2025 (aged 82) Miami, Florida, United States
- Genres: Latin pop; pop; soft rock; bolero
- Occupations: Singer; composer; actor
- Instrument: Vocals
- Years active: 1963–2025
- Labels: CBS Records; Sony Music; Ariola; BMG; Universal Music

Leopoldo Dante Tévez (known as Leo Dan; March 22, 1942 – January 1, 2025) was an Argentine composer and singer. He recorded more than 20 albums during his long career during the late 20th century between Argentina and Mexico.

== Life and career ==
His hits include "Celia", "Fanny", "Cómo te extraño, mi amor", "Estelita", "Libre solterito y sin nadie", "Santiago querido", "Qué tiene la niña", "Por un caminito", "Solo una vez", "Mary es mi amor", "Siempre estoy pensando en ella", "Te he prometido", "Esa pared", "Toquen mariachis, canten", "El radio está tocando tu canción", "Pareces una nena", "Yo sé que no es feliz", "Más que un loco", "Fue una noche de verano", "Pídeme la luna" and "Ojos Azules". His appreciation for Mexican music led him to record with mariachis, and from there, he went to international fame. His music was well received by the Mexican public since his voice was a good match to the traditional mariachi sound.

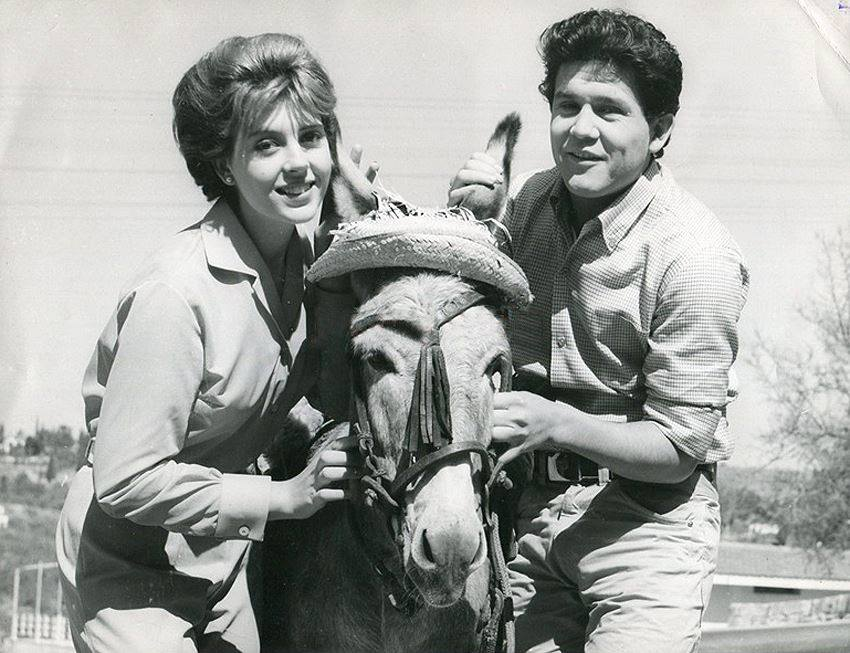
Dan with Claudia Mores (left) in 1966

Dan lived in the United States. He, Palito Ortega and Leonardo Favio are considered the principal Argentine singers of the Nueva Ola (New Wave) music that was popular in the 1960s and 1970s in Latin America. With a mellow voice and his individual interpretative style, Leo Dan is one of the most recognized figures among Spanish-language vocalists. His inspiration went further than interpretation; he also wrote most of his popular hits.

In 2012, the Latin Recording Academy honored Leo Dan by presenting him with The Latin Recording Academy Lifetime Achievement Award.

Tévez's hit "Te he prometido" features prominently in Alfonso Cuarón's 2018 multi-Oscar and Golden Globe-winning film Roma.

Dan died on January 1, 2025, at the age of 82.

== Partial discography ==
- 1963 – Leo Dan
- 1964 – Como Te Extraño Mi Amor
- 1964 – El Fenómeno
- 1965 – Bajo El Signo De Leo
- 1966 – Libre, Solterito y Sin Nadie
- 1967 – Así Soy Yo
- 1967 – La Novela Del Joven Pobre
- 1968 – Quiero Que Me Beses Amor Mío
- 1969 – Canta Trovador
- 1969 – Y Que Viva Tu Amor
- 1970 – Con Los Brazos Cruzados
- 1970 – Mucho, Mucho
- 1971 – ¿Cómo Poder Saber Si Te Amo?
- 1971 – Triunfador De América
- 1972 – Quien No Tiene Una Ilusión
- 1973 – Para Qué
- 1973 – Siempre Estoy Pensando En Ella
- 1974 – Tu Llegaste Cuando Menos Lo Esperaba
- 1975 – Esa Pared
- 1976 – Amar, Sabiendo Perdonar
- 1976 – Tú
- 1977 – Pero Esa Vez, Lloré
- 1978 – XV Años De Oro
- 1979 – Ahora Con Mariachi
- 1979 – Tengo Que Buscar A Lola
- 1980 – Con Sabor Ranchero
- 1980 – Santiago Querido (Con Los Manseros Santiagueños)
- 1980 – Vallenato
- 1981 – Canta Folklore
- 1981 – Mi Vida La Paso Cantando
- 1981 – Niña Que Tienen Tus Ojos
- 1982 – El Radio Está Tocando Tu Canción
- 1982 – Tengan Cuidado
- 1983 – Con Sabor A México
- 1983 – Linda
- 1985 – La Fé De Un Elegido
- 1986 – Ojos Azules
- 1987 – 15 Auténticos Éxitos
- 1988 – Más Que Un Loco
- 1989 – Noche De Verano
- 1990 – Soy De Cualquier Lugar
- 1991 – Leo Rap
- 1992 – Como Un León
- 1993 – Antologia Musical
- 1994 – Después De Conocerte
- 1996 – Asi Es El Amor
- 1996 – Idolos De Siempre
- 1997 – Acompáñame
- 1999 – A Pesar De Los Años [Mate] (Disco Cristiano)
- 1999 – Encuentro Santiagueño
- 1999 – Mis 30 Mejores Canciones (Nuevas Grabaciones) (2 CD)
- 1999 – Todos Sus Grandes Exitos En España (1963–1976)
- 2001 – Amanecer desnudo
- 2002 – 20 De Colección
- 2002 – Exitos Con Mariachi
- 2002 – Personalidad (20 Exitos)
- 2005 – De Regreso
- 2004 – 20 Éxitos De Leo Dan (En Vivo)
- 2006 – 20 Éxitos Originales
- 2006 – Canciones De Amor
- 2006 – La Historia
- 2008 – Lo Esencial De Leo Dan (3 CD)
- 2009 – Aires De Zamba
- 2013 – Leo, Escribo y Canto
- 2018 – Celebrando a una Leyenda
- Los discos de oro
- Para ti mis canciones
- Romántico y ranchero (2 volumes)
- Leo Dan y Leonardo Favio, frente a frente
- Latin stars
- El disco del millón
- El ídolo
- Los fabulosos 60's
- Los mejores
- Dos en uno
- 15 pistas para cantar
- Años dorados
- ¿Cómo poder saber si te amo? (reedición)*

== Filmography ==
- Cómo te extraño (1966)
- Story of a Poor Young Man (1968)

== See also ==
- List of best-selling Latin music artists
