= List of Billboard Latin Pop Albums number ones from the 2000s =

Latin Pop Albums, published in Billboard magazine, is a record chart that features Latin music sales information in regard to Latin pop music. The data is compiled by Nielsen SoundScan from a sample that includes music stores, music departments at electronics and department stores, Internet sales (both physical and digital) and verifiable sales from concert venues in the United States.

== Number-one albums ==
Key

† – Best-selling Latin pop album of the year

| Artist | Album | Reached number one | Weeks at number one |
|---|---|---|---|
| Elvis Crespo | The Remixes | 15 January 2000 | 1 |
| Shakira | Dónde Están los Ladrones? | 22 January 2000 | 2 |
| Elvis Crespo | The Remixes | 5 February 2000 | 3 |
| Enrique Iglesias | The Best Hits | 26 February 2000 | 3 |
| Shakira | MTV Unplugged | 18 March 2000 | 8 |
| Alejandro Fernández | Entre Tus Brazos | 13 May 2000 | 8 |
| Julio Iglesias | Noche de Cuatro Lunas | 8 July 2000 | 8 |
| Thalía | Arrasando | 2 September 2000 | 2 |
| Ricardo Arjona | Galería Caribe | 16 September 2000 | 2 |
| Christina Aguilera | Mi Reflejo †(2000) | 30 September 2000 | 19 |
| Juan Gabriel | Abrázame Muy Fuerte | 10 February 2001 | 1 |
| Paulina Rubio | Paulina †(2001) | 17 February 2001 | 4 |
| Ricky Martin | La Historia | 17 March 2001 | 2 |
| Kumbia Kings | Shhh! | 31 March 2001 | 1 |
| Ricky Martin | La Historia | 7 April 2001 | 2 |
| Selena | Live! The Last Concert | 21 April 2001 | 1 |
| Ricky Martin | La Historia | 28 April 2001 | 2 |
| Kumbia Kings | Shhh! | 12 May 2001 | 2 |
| Paulina Rubio | Paulina †(2001) | 26 May 2001 | 1 |
| Kumbia Kings | Shhh! | 2 June 2001 | 2 |
| Marco Antonio Solís | Más de Mi Alma | 16 June 2001 | 5 |
| Jaguares | Cuando la Sangre Galopa | 28 July 2001 | 1 |
| Kumbia Kings | Shhh! | 4 August 2001 | 3 |
| Paulina Rubio | Paulina †(2001) | 25 August 2001 | 4 |
| Kumbia Kings | Shhh! | 22 September 2001 | 1 |
| Ozomatli | Embrace the Chaos | 29 September 2001 | 1 |
| Ricardo Arjona | Galería Caribe | 6 October 2001 | 1 |
| Ozomatli | Embrace the Chaos | 13 October 2001 | 1 |
| Gipsy Kings | Somos Gitanos | 20 October 2001 | 4 |
| Alejandro Fernández | Orígenes | 17 November 2001 | 1 |
| Gipsy Kings | Somos Gitanos | 24 November 2001 | 2 |
| Luis Miguel | Mis Romances †(2002) | 8 December 2001 | 14 |
| Alejandro Sanz | MTV Unplugged | 16 March 2002 | 2 |
| Luis Fonsi | Amor Secreto | 30 March 2002 | 2 |
| Chayanne | Grandes Éxitos | 13 April 2002 | 7 |
| Pilar Montenegro | Desahogo | 1 June 2002 | 1 |
| Thalía | Thalía | 8 June 2002 | 5 |
| Chayanne | Grandes Éxitos | 13 July 2002 | 2 |
| Thalía | Thalía | 27 July 2002 | 1 |
| Chayanne | Grandes Éxitos | 3 August 2002 | 1 |
| Juanes | Un Día Normal | 10 August 2002 | 1 |
| Ednita Nazario | Acústico | 17 August 2002 | 3 |
| Maná | Revolución de Amor | 7 September 2002 | 4 |
| Enrique Iglesias | Quizás | 5 October 2002 | 4 |
| Las Ketchup | Hijas del Tomate | 2 November 2002 | 3 |
| Shakira | Grandes Éxitos | 23 November 2002 | 1 |
| Las Ketchup | Hijas del Tomate | 30 November 2002 | 9 |
| Shakira | Grandes Éxitos | 1 February 2003 | 2 |
| Manuel Galban featuring Ry Cooder | Mambo Sinuendo | 15 February 2003 | 4 |
| Kumbia Kings | 4 | 15 March 2003 | 9 |
| Various artists | Songs 4 Worship En Español: Canta al Señor | 17 May 2003 | 1 |
| José Feliciano | Señor Bolero 2 | 24 May 2003 | 1 |
| Marco Antonio Solís | Tu Amor o Tu Desprecio | 31 May 2003 | 1 |
| Ricky Martin | Almas del Silencio | 7 June 2003 | 12 |
| Juanes | Un Día Normal †(2003) | 30 August 2003 | 2 |
| Chayanne | Sincero | 13 September 2003 | 1 |
| Juanes | Un Día Normal †(2003) | 20 September 2003 | 4 |
| Luis Miguel | 33 | 18 October 2003 | 3 |
| Kumbia Kings | La Historia | 8 November 2003 | 2 |
| Marco Antonio Solís | La Historia Continúa... | 22 November 2003 | 2 |
| Ednita Nazario | Por Tí | 6 December 2003 | 1 |
| Kumbia Kings | La Historia | 13 December 2003 | 3 |
| Juanes | Un Día Normal †(2003) | 3 January 2004 | 1 |
| Marco Antonio Solís | La Historia Continúa... †(2004) | 10 January 2004 | 2 |
| Juanes | Un Día Normal †(2003) | 24 January 2004 | 1 |
| Kumbia Kings | La Historia | 31 January 2004 | 3 |
| Marco Antonio Solís | La Historia Continúa... †(2004) | 7 February 2004 | 3 |
| Paulina Rubio | Pau-Latina | 28 February 2004 | 3 |
| Thalía | Greatest Hits | 20 March 2004 | 2 |
| Paulina Rubio | Pau-Latina | 3 April 2004 | 3 |
| Gipsy Kings | Roots | 24 April 2004 | 6 |
| Jennifer Peña | Seducción (album) | 5 June 2004 | 3 |
| Marc Anthony | Amar Sin Mentiras | 26 June 2004 | 12 |
| Pepe Aguilar | No Soy de Nadie | 18 September 2004 | 1 |
| Alejandro Fernández | A Corazón Abierto | 25 September 2004 | 3 |
| Juanes | Mi Sangre | 16 October 2004 | 5 |
| Marco Antonio Solís | Razón de Sobra | 20 November 2004 | 4 |
| Juanes | Mi Sangre | 18 December 2004 | 26 |
| Marco Antonio Solís | La Historia Continúa... Parte II | 11 June 2005 | 2 |
| Shakira | Fijación Oral Vol. 1 †(2005) | 25 June 2005 | 15 |
| Chayanne | Cautivo | 15 October 2005 | 1 |
| Shakira | Fijación Oral Vol. 1 †(2005) | 22 October 2005 | 2 |
| RBD | Nuestro Amor †(2006) | 5 November 2005 | 4 |
| Shakira | Fijación Oral Vol. 1 †(2005) | 3 December 2005 | 7 |
| RBD | Nuestro Amor †(2006) | 21 January 2006 | 1 |
| RBD | Rebelde | 28 January 2006 | 2 |
| RBD | Nuestro Amor †(2006) | 11 February 2006 | 7 |
| Andrea Bocelli | Amore | 25 March 2006 | 2 |
| Various artists | Now Esto Es Musica! Latino | 8 April 2006 | 21 |
| Maná | Amar es Combatir | 9 September 2006 | 4 |
| Paulina Rubio | Ananda | 7 October 2006 | 1 |
| Marco Antonio Solís | Trozos de Mi Alma, Vol. 2 | 14 October 2006 | 6 |
| Kumbia All Starz | Ayer Fue Kumbia Kings, Hoy Es Kumbia All Starz | 11 November 2006 | 2 |
| Ricky Martin | MTV Unplugged | 25 November 2006 | 1 |
| Luis Miguel | Navidades | 2 December 2006 | 1 |
| RBD | Celestial †(2007) | 9 December 2006 | 13 |
| Maná | Amar es Combatir | 3 March 2007 | 2 |
| Marco Antonio Solís | La Historia Continúa... Parte III | 17 March 2007 | 4 |
| Jennifer Lopez | Como ama una Mujer | 14 April 2007 | 7 |
| Marco Antonio Solís | La Mejor... Colección | 2 June 2007 | 3 |
| Yolandita Monge | Demasiado Fuerte | 23 June 2007 | 1 |
| Marco Antonio Solís | La Mejor... Colección | 30 June 2007 | 2 |
| Alejandro Fernández | Viento a favor | 14 July 2007 | 3 |
| Camila | Todo Cambió | 4 August 2007 | 5 |
| Ricardo Arjona | Quién Dijo Ayer | 8 September 2007 | 1 |
| Camila | Todo Cambió | 15 September 2007 | 1 |
| Manu Chao | La Radiolina | 22 September 2007 | 1 |
| Camila | Todo Cambió | 29 September 2007 | 1 |
| Marco Antonio Solís | La Mejor... Colección †(2008) | 6 October 2007 | 3 |
| Various artists | Now Esto Es Musica! Latino 3 | 27 October 2007 | 2 |
| Juanes | La Vida... Es Un Ratico | 10 November 2007 | 4 |
| RBD | Empezar Desde Cero | 8 December 2007 | 3 |
| Ednita Nazario | Real | 29 December 2007 | 1 |
| Juanes | La Vida... Es Un Ratico | 5 January 2008 | 2 |
| Camila | Todo Cambió | 19 January 2008 | 4 |
| Marco Antonio Solís | La Mejor... Colección †(2008) | 16 February 2008 | 1 |
| Camila | Todo Cambió | 23 February 2008 | 7 |
| Enrique Iglesias | 95/08 Éxitos | 12 April 2008 | 5 |
| Maná | Arde el Cielo | 17 May 2008 | 1 |
| Luis Miguel | Cómplices | 24 May 2008 | 2 |
| Maná | Arde el Cielo | 7 June 2008 | 4 |
| Enrique Iglesias | 95/08 Éxitos | 5 July 2008 | 10 |
| Luis Fonsi | Palabras del Silencio †(2009) | 13 September 2008 | 8 |
| Enrique Iglesias | 95/08 Éxitos | 8 November 2008 | 2 |
| Luis Fonsi | Palabras del Silencio †(2009) | 22 November 2008 | 1 |
| Enrique Iglesias | 95/08 Éxitos | 29 November 2008 | 1 |
| Ricardo Arjona | 5to Piso | 6 December 2008 | 4 |
| Tiziano Ferro | A Mi Edad | 3 January 2009 | 1 |
| Luis Fonsi | Palabras del Silencio †(2009) | 10 January 2009 | 5 |
| Alejandro Fernández | De Noche: Clásicos a Mi Manera | 14 February 2009 | 2 |
| Luis Fonsi | Palabras del Silencio †(2009) | 28 February 2009 | 5 |
| La 5ª Estación | Sin Frenos | 4 April 2009 | 1 |
| Various artists | Now Esto Es Musica! Latino 4 | 11 April 2009 | 1 |
| Luis Fonsi | Palabras del Silencio †(2009) | 18 April 2009 | 5 |
| Víctor Manuelle | Muy Personal | 23 May 2009 | 3 |
| Marisela | 20 Exitos Inmortales | 13 June 2009 | 4 |
| Paulina Rubio | Gran City Pop | 11 July 2009 | 7 |
| Pee Wee | Yo Soy | 29 August 2009 | 2 |
| Ricardo Arjona | 5to Piso | 12 September 2009 | 1 |
| Tercer Cielo | Gente Comun, Sueños Extraordinarios | 19 September 2009 | 1 |
| Luis Fonsi | Palabras del Silencio †(2009) | 26 September 2009 | 1 |
| Nelly Furtado | Mi Plan | 3 October 2009 | 5 |
| David Bisbal | Sin Mirar Atrás | 7 November 2009 | 1 |
| Ednita Nazario | Soy | 14 November 2009 | 2 |
| Alejandro Sanz | Paraíso Express | 28 November 2009 | 1 |
| Jencarlos Canela | Buscame | 5 December 2009 | 1 |
| Andrea Bocelli | Mi Navidad | 12 December 2009 | 2 |
| Alejandro Fernández | Dos Mundos: Evolucíon | 26 December 2009 | 2 |
