= La Mejor... Colección =

Compilation album by Marco Antonio Solís
- Released: December 11, 2007
- Recorded: 1992–2004
- Genre: Pop Latino
- Length: 2:03:51
- Label: Fonovisa

Marco Antonio Solís chronology
La Historia Continúa... Parte III (2007)	La Mejor... Colección (2007)	Una Noche en Madrid (2008)

La Mejor Colección (Eng.: "The Best Collection") is a two disc compilation album released by Marco Antonio Solís on December 11, 2007.

== Track listing ==
=== Disc 1 ===
All songs written and composed by Marco Antonio Solís

No.	Title	Length
1.	"Si No Te Hubieras Ido"	04:50
2.	"Boca de Angel"	04:03
3.	"O Me Voy o Te Vas"	04:50
4.	"Mi Eterno Amor Secreto"	03:46
5.	"Se Va Muriendo Mi Alma"	04:34
6.	"Desde Que Te Perdi"	03:43
7.	"Si Te Pudiera Mentir"	04:24
8.	"Recuerdos, Tristeza y Soledad"	04:30
9.	"Amor en Silencio"	03:58
10.	"Se Que Me Va a Dejar"	04:21
11.	"Cuando Te Acuerdes de Mi"	04:41
12.	"Tu Amor o Tu Desprecio"	03:17
13.	"El Peor de Mis Fracasos"	04:13
14.	"Prefiero Partir"	03:35
15.	"Mas Que Tu Amigo"	03:31

=== Disc 2 ===
All songs written and composed by Marco Antonio Solís except for Casas de Carton

No.	Title	Length
1.	"Que Te Quieran Mas Que Yo"	04:23
2.	"Quiéreme"	04:10
3.	"A Aquella"	03:36
4.	"La Ultima Parte"	04:39
5.	"A Que Me Quedo Contigo"	04:20
6.	"Sin Lado Izquierdo"	04:22
7.	"Mujeres Solitas"	03:26
8.	"Nuestra Confesion"	03:27
9.	"En Desventaja"	03:23
10.	"En el Mismo Tren"	04:11
11.	"Tu Compañero"	03:35
12.	"Casas de Carton (written by Alí Primera)"	04:51
13.	"Para Que Seas Feliz"	04:53
14.	"Fue Mejor Asi"	03:57
15.	"Pirekua Michoacana"	04:37

== Charts ==
=== Weekly charts ===
Chart (2007)	Peak position
Mexican Albums (AMPROFON)	79
US Billboard 200	92
US Top Latin Albums (Billboard)	2
US Latin Pop Albums (Billboard)	1

=== Year-end charts ===
Chart (2008)	Position
US Top Latin Albums (Billboard)	3

== Sales and certifications ==
Region	Certification	Certified units/sales
Argentina (CAPIF)	Gold	20,000^{^}
^{^} Shipments figures based on certification alone.

US Sales as of July 11, 2007: 43,511 copies
