= Inolvidable =

Inolvidable (Unforgettable) or variants may refer to:

== Film and TV ==
- La inolvidable, a Venezuelan telenovela

== Music ==
=== Albums ===
- Inolvidable, a 1999 album by Diego Verdaguer
- Inolvidable, a reissue of Unforgettable, a 2005 compilation album by American singer Selena
- Inolvidables, Los Ángeles Azules 1996
- 15 Inolvidables (disambiguation)
- 20 Inolvidables (disambiguation)
- 30 Inolvidables (disambiguation)
- Inolvidables, a 1992 album by Roberto Carlos

=== Songs ===
- "Inolvidable" (song), a 1944 bolero written by Julio Gutiérrez in 1944, covered by Luis Miguel 1992
- "Inolvidable", the Spanish version of "Incancellabile", a 1996 song performed by Italian singer Laura Pausini
- "Inolvidable" (Reik song), a 2008 song performed by Mexican band Reik from the album Un Día Más
- "Inolvidable", a 2008 song by Jenni Rivera from her album Mi Vida Loca
