= La Historia Continúa... Parte III =

Compilation album by Marco Antonio Solís
- Released: February 27, 2007
- Recorded: 1992–2007
- Genre: Pop Latino
- Length: 72:20
- Label: Fonovisa

Marco Antonio Solís chronology
Dos Idolos (2005)	La Historia Continúa... Parte III (2007)	La Mejor... Colección (2007)

Professional ratings
Review scores
Source	Rating
Allmusic	4/5 stars

La Historia Continúa... Parte III (Eng.: The History Continues... Vol. 3) is a compilation album released by Marco Antonio Solís on February 27, 2007. This album became his seventh number-one set on the Billboard Top Latin Albums. The album was released in a standard CD presentation and in a CD/DVD combo including the music videos for the singles "Sin Lado Izquierdo", "Mi Mayor Necesidad", "Tu Amor o Tu Desprecio" and "Casas de Cartón".

== Track listing ==
All songs written and composed by Marco Antonio Solís except for Casas de Carton

No.	Title	Length
1.	"Medley: Dónde Estará Mi Primavera/Mi Mayor Necesidad/Mi Mayor Sacrificio/Tu Carcel/Si No Te Hubieras Ido/Más Que Tu Amigo"	07:18
2.	"Sin Lado Izquierdo"	04:21
3.	"Casas de Cartón (written by Ali Primera)"	04:51
4.	"Y Yo Sin Tí"	03:44
5.	"En Desventaja"	03:22
6.	"Para Que Seas Feliz"	04:52
7.	"Tu Compañero"	03:34
8.	"Mi Mayor Necesidad"	04:10
9.	"Fue Mejor Así"	03:57
10.	"Pirekua Michoacana"	04:37
11.	"Tu Eres Mi Lugar"	04:33
12.	"En El Mismo Tren"	04:10
13.	"Desde Afuera"	04:13
14.	"Mujeres Solitas"	03:25
15.	"Un Par de Humanos"	04:41
16.	"El Milagrito"	03:36
17.	"Nuestra Confesión"	03:36

== DVD ==
No.	Title	Length
1.	"Sin Lado Izquierdo"	4:29
2.	"Mi Mayor Necesidad"	4:09
3.	"Tu Amor o Tu Desprecio"	5:21
4.	"Casas de Carton"	4:50

== Chart performance ==
Chart (2007)	Peak position
Mexico AMPROFON Albums Chart	78
USA Billboard Top Latin Albums	1
US Billboard Latin Pop Albums	1
US Billboard 200	91

Year-End Charts

Chart (2007)	Peak position
US Billboard Top Latin Albums Year-End Chart	37
US Billboard Latin Pop Albums Year-End Chart	12

== Sales and certifications ==
Region	Certification	Certified units/sales
Argentina (CAPIF)	Gold	20,000^{^}
United States (RIAA)	Platinum (Latin)	100,000^{^}
^{^} Shipments figures based on certification alone.
