= 40 Años =

40 Años (Spanish "cuarenta años") or 40 Anos (Portuguese "quarenta anos") may refer to:

- 40 Años (album), by Marco Antonio Solís, 2016
- 40 Años, an album by Amigos de Gines, 2010
- 40 Años, an album by Orquesta Filarmómoca de Bogotá, winner of the 2008 Latin Grammy Award for Best Instrumental Album
- 40 Años de la Sonora Matancera, an album by Sonora Matancera
- 40 Anos Depois, an album by João Bosco, 2012
