= Antología (Marco Antonio Solís album) =

Compilation album by Marco Antonio Solís
- Released: January 28, 2014
- Recorded: 1996 – 2010
- Genre: Latin
- Label: Fonovisa
- Producer: Marco Antonio Solís

Marco Antonio Solís chronology
Una Noche de Luna (2012)	Antología (2014)	15 Inolvidables (2015)

Antología is a compilation album released by Marco Antonio Solís on January 28, 2014.

== Disc 1 ==
All songs written and composed by Marco Antonio Solís

No.	Title	Length
1.	"O Me Voy o Te Vas"	4:49
2.	"Mi Eterno Amor Secreto"	3:45
3.	"Donde Estara Mi Primavera"	4:18
4.	"Asi Como Te Conoci"	4:23
5.	"La Venia Bendita"	3:13
6.	"Se Va Muriendo Mi Alma"	4:34
7.	"Desde Que Te Perdí"	3:42
8.	"Sigue Sin Mi"	4:00
9.	"Boca de Angel"	4:02
10.	"Si Te Pudiera Mentir"	4:24
11.	"Recuerdos, Tristeza y Soledad"	4:30
12.	"Tu Hombre Perfecto"	4:23
13.	"Me Vas a Hacer Llorar"	3:25
14.	"Amor en Silencio"	3:56
15.	"Invéntame"	3:31
16.	"Se Que Me Va a Dejar"	4:20
17.	"Mi Ultimo Adios"	3:43
18.	"Tu Dulce y Mi Sal"	6:17

== Disc 2 ==
All songs written and composed by Marco Antonio Solís

No.	Title	Length
1.	"Más Que Tu Amigo"	3:32
2.	"Cuando Te Acuerdes de Mi"	4:41
3.	"El Peor de Mis Fracasos"	4:14
4.	"Que Pena Me Das"	4:10
5.	"Tu Amor o Tu Desprecio"	3:17
6.	"Que Te Quieran Más Que Yo"	4:22
7.	"A Que Me Quedo Contigo"	4:19
8.	"Prefiero Partir"	4:34
9.	"Acepto Mi Derrota"	4:11
10.	"La Ultima Parte"	4:37
11.	"O Soy, O Fui"	4:01
12.	"Si No Te Hubieras Ido"	4:49
13.	"El Masoquista"	3:35
14.	"Ya Aprenderas"	3:48
15.	"Los Dos Contra Mi"	3:49
16.	"Tu Par"	3:58
17.	"Hermano"	5:11
18.	"Con la Vida Comprada"	3:36

== Disc 3 ==
All songs written and composed by Marco Antonio Solís

No.	Title	Length
1.	"Sin Lado Izquierdo"	4:20
2.	"Ya Nada Es Igual"	3:10
3.	"En Desventaja"	3:22
4.	"Para Que Seas Feliz"	4:54
5.	"Tú Compañero"	3:35
6.	"Fue Mejor Asi"	3:58
7.	"Pirekua Michoacana"	4:37
8.	"En el Mismo Tren"	4:10
9.	"Desde Afuera"	4:13
10.	"Mujeres Solitas"	3:25
11.	"Un Par de Humanos"	4:42
12.	"El Milagrito"	3:37
13.	"Nuestra Confesión"	3:35
14.	"El Diablillo"	3:48
15.	"Si Me Puedo Quedar"	3:42
16.	"Razón de Sobra"	4:10
17.	"Se Que Te Irá Mejor"	4:10
18.	"Hay Veces"	4:48

== Disc 4 ==
All songs written and composed by Marco Antonio Solís

No.	Title	Length
1.	"Pidemelo Todo"	3:40
2.	"Dios Bendiga Nuestro Amor"	3:54
3.	"¿A Dónde Vamos a Parar?"	3:48
4.	"Tú Me Vuelves Loco"	3:22
5.	"No Puedo Olvidarla"	4:04
6.	"Mi Mayor Sacrificio"	4:04
7.	"Muévete"	3:36
8.	"Resignacion"	3:48
9.	"No Molestar"	4:24
10.	"Hasta Cuando"	3:49
11.	"Tú Otra Vez"	3:58
12.	"Te Voy a Esperar"	3:44
13.	"Quien Sabe Tú"	3:30
14.	"Deséame Suerte"	3:10
15.	"Hay de Amores a Amores"	3:52
16.	"Él Nunca Te Olvida"	3:49
17.	"Luna Llena"	3:39
18.	"Te lo Puedo Asegurar"	3:33

== DVD ==
No.	Title	Length
1.	"Que Pena Me Das"
2.	"Muévete"
3.	"O Me Voy o Te Vas"
4.	"Donde Estara Mi Primavera"
5.	"La Venia Bendita"
6.	"Tu Amor o Tu Desprecio"
7.	"Si Te Pudiera Mentir"
8.	"Me Vas a Hacer Llorar"
9.	"Más Que Tu Amigo"
10.	"Recuerdos, Tristeza y Soledad"
11.	"Sigue Sin Mi"
12.	"Sin Lado Izquierdo"
13.	"Antes de Que Te Vayas"
14.	"No Puedo Olvidarla"
15.	"Mi Mayor Sacrificio"
16.	"No Molestar"
17.	"Tú Me Vuelves Loco"
18.	"¿A Dónde Vamos a Parar?"

== Charts ==
Chart (2014)	Peak position
US Top Latin Albums (Billboard)	13
