= Una Noche de Luna =

Live album by Marco Antonio Solís
- Released: June 26, 2012
- Recorded: 2011; Estadio Luna Park (Buenos Aires, Argentina)
- Genre: Latin
- Label: Fonovisa
- Producer: Marco Antonio Solís

Marco Antonio Solís chronology
La Historia Continúa... Parte IV (2012)	Una Noche de Luna (2012)	Antología (2014)

Una Noche de Luna is a live album released by Marco Antonio Solís on June 26, 2012. The concert was recorded at Estadio Luna Park, Buenos Aires, Argentina in 2011. A DVD will also come with the album.

== Track listing ==
All songs written and composed by Marco Antonio Solís

No.	Title	Length
1.	"Introducción"	01:09
2.	"Dios Bendiga Nuestro Amor"	04:42
3.	"Morenita"	03:25
4.	"Sigue Sin Mi"	04:08
5.	"Y Ahora Te Vas"	04:39
6.	"Mi Eterno Amor Secreto"	04:08
7.	"Nada Que Me Recuerde a Ti/Dime Donde y Cuando"	03:45
8.	"Cuando Te Acuerdes de Mi"	04:49
9.	"Tú Me Vuelves Loco"	03:29
10.	"El Milagrito"	08:53
11.	"¿A Dónde Vamos a Parar?"	04:29
12.	"Más Que Tu Amigo"	04:25

== DVD ==
No.	Title	Length
1.	"Introducción"
2.	"Dios Bendiga Nuestro Amor"
3.	"Responsabilidad"
4.	"Morenita"
5.	"Sigue Sin Mi"
6.	"La Verdad"
7.	"Y Ahora Te Vas"
8.	"Mi Eterno Amor Secreto"
9.	"Rituales"
10.	"Nada Que Me Recuerde a Ti/Dime Donde y Cuando"
11.	"Cuando Te Acuerdes de Mí"
12.	"Tú Me Vuelves Loco"
13.	"Ritmo de Trabajo"
14.	"El Milagrito"
15.	"Agradecimiento"
16.	"¿A Dónde Vamos a Parar?"
17.	"Más Que Tu Amigo"
18.	"Creditos"

== Chart performance ==
Chart (2012)	Peak position
Mexico Top 100	19
US Billboard 200	120
US Top Latin Albums (Billboard)	1
US Latin Pop Albums (Billboard)	1

== Sales and certifications ==
Region	Certification	Certified units/sales
Mexico (AMPROFON)	Platinum	60,000^{^}
^{^} Shipments figures based on certification alone.
