= La Historia Continúa... Parte IV =

La Historia Continua Parte IV

Compilation album by Marco Antonio Solís
- Released: January 24, 2012
- Recorded: 1996 – 2010
- Genre: Latin
- Length: 70:26
- Label: Fonovisa
- Producer: Marco Antonio Solís

Marco Antonio Solís chronology
Más de Marco Antonio Solís (2009)	La Historia Continua Parte IV (2012)	Una Noche de Luna (2012)

La Historia Continua... Parte IV is a compilation album released by Marco Antonio Solís on January 24, 2012.

== Track listing ==
All songs written and composed by Marco Antonio Solís

No.	Title	Length
1.	"¿A Dónde Vamos a Parar?"	03:50
2.	"Tú Me Vuelves Loco"	03:23
3.	"No Puedo Olvidarla"	04:06
4.	"Mi Mayor Sacrificio"	04:05
5.	"Muévete"	03:37
6.	"Resignacion"	03:50
7.	"Extrañandote"	04:11
8.	"No Molestar"	04:26
9.	"Hasta Cuando"	03:51
10.	"Tú Otra Vez"	04:00
11.	"Si No Te Hubieras Ido"	04:50
12.	"Te Voy a Esperar"	03:46
13.	"Quien Sabe Tú"	03:31
14.	"Deséame Suerte"	03:11
15.	"Hay de Amores a Amores"	03:53
16.	"Él Nunca Te Olvida"	03:50
17.	"Razón de Sobra"	04:11
18.	"Que Pena Me Das"	04:11

== Charts ==
Chart (2012)	Peak position
US Top Latin Albums (Billboard)	6
