= La Historia Continúa... Parte II =

Compilation album by Marco Antonio Solís
- Released: May 24, 2005
- Recorded: 1987–2003
- Genre: Pop Latino
- Length: 73:11
- Label: Fonovisa

Marco Antonio Solís chronology
Dos Grandes (2004)	La Historia Continúa... Parte II (2005)	Dos Idolos (2005)

Professional ratings
Review scores
Source	Rating
Allmusic	4/5 stars

La Historia Continúa... Parte II (Eng.: The History Continues... Vol. 2) is a compilation album released by Marco Antonio Solís on May 24, 2005.

== Track listing ==
all songs written and composed by Marco Antonio Solís

No.	Title	Length
1.	"Más Que Tu Amigo"	03:32
2.	"Cuando Te Acuerdes de Mi"	04:33
3.	"El Peor de Mis Fracasos"	04:12
4.	"Cómo Fuí a Enamorarme de Ti"	04:32
5.	"Que Pena Me Das"	04:07
6.	"Tu Amor o Tu Desprecio"	03:16
7.	"Que Te Quieran Más Que Yo"	04:23
8.	"A Que Me Quedo Contigo"	04:20
9.	"Prefiero Partir"	03:35
10.	"Acepto Mi Derrota"	04:11
11.	"La Ultima Parte"	04:39
12.	"Será Mejor Que Te Vayas"	05:03
13.	"Quiéreme"	04:12
14.	"Las Noches Las Hago Días"	02:55
15.	"O Soy, O Fui"	04:01
16.	"Tu Carcel"	03:34
17.	"Si No Te Hubieras Ido"	04:49
18.	"A Aquella"	03:35

== Chart performance ==
Chart (2005)	Peak position
Mexican Albums Chart	41
U.S. Billboard Top Latin Albums	2
U.S. Billboard Latin Pop Albums	1
U.S. Billboard 200	92

== Sales and certifications ==
Region	Certification	Certified units/sales
Argentina (CAPIF)	Platinum	40,000^{^}
Chile	—	35,000
Mexico (AMPROFON)	Gold	50,000^{^}
United States (RIAA)	4× Platinum (Latin)	400,000^{^}
^{^} Shipments figures based on certification alone.
