= 15 Inolvidables (disambiguation) =

15 Inolvidables is a compilation album by Marco Antonio Solís.

15 Inolvidables may also refer to:

- 15 Inolvidables Vol. 2, a compilation album by Marco Antonio Solís
- 15 Inolvidables by Grupo Pegasso
- 15 Inolvidables Éxitos by Lola Beltrán
- 15 Inolvidables Éxitos by Tito Rodríguez
- 15 Inolvidables de Siempre by Grupo Bryndis
- 15 Inolvidables en la Voz de by Agustin Lara
- 15 Inolvidables en la Voz de by Rebeca Pous Del Toro
- Las 15 Inolvidables de by Pedro Infante
- 15 Éxitos Inolvidables de by José Alfredo Jiménez
