= El ángel de Aurora =

2024 Mexican telenovela

- Genre: Telenovela
- Based on: Muchachita by Ricardo Rentería
- Developed by: Jaime Sierra; Helena Aguilera; Natalia Mejía
- Directed by: Aurelio Ávila; Luis Vélez
- Starring: Jorge Salinas; Natalia Esperón; Rafael Novoa
- Theme music composer: Jorge Eduardo Murguía; Mauricio L. Arriaga
- Opening theme: "Encontrarnos de nuevo" by Manuel Mijares & Lucero Mijares
- Composer: Berenice González
- Country of origin: Mexico
- Original language: Spanish
- No. of seasons: 1
- No. of episodes: 136

Production
- Executive producer: Roy Rojas
- Producer: Cristian Rojas
- Editors: Isabella Rodríguez; Christopher Cruz; Carolina Rivas
- Camera setup: Multi-camera
- Production company: TelevisaUnivision

Original release
- Network: Las Estrellas
- Release: 29 July 2024 – 2 February 2025

El ángel de Aurora (English title: Aurora's Quest) is a Mexican telenovela produced by Roy Rojas for TelevisaUnivision. It is based on the 1986 Mexican telenovela Muchachita created by Ricardo Rentería. The series stars Natalia Esperón, Jorge Salinas and Rafael Novoa. It aired on Las Estrellas from 29 July 2024 to 2 February 2025.

== Plot ==
In her youth, Aurora became engaged to Antonio Murrieta, who loves her deeply. Aurora's sister Jezabel, seeing her happiness, is filled with jealousy which causes her to devise the unthinkable with the intention of destroying her. At the height of her resentment, Jezabel puts Aurora in the hands of a bricklayer nicknamed El Pintas, who rapes her, impregnating her with a son to be named Gabriel. Jezabel's manipulations and lies cause Antonio to abandon Aurora, with Gabriel in her arms, on their wedding day. Blinded by his sexism, Miguel, Aurora's father, snatches her son from her and gives him to Pascual Santos, who raises him with his wife Victoria.

Twenty-nine years later, Gabriel is now Ángel Santos, a humbly educated man, but with the strongest family values. Fate brings Ángel's life to Helena Murrieta, Antonio's daughter. Helena is an idealistic and entrepreneurial young woman who starts working at Corporativo Campero as Marketing Manager. Ángel and Helena fall in love, however, Helena is the girlfriend of Demián, Jezabel's son, who has inherited from his mother the ability to manipulate, and because of his ambition, he is willing to step over everyone, even his own family.

Despite all the years that have passed, Aurora does not lose hope of finding her son Gabriel and discovers that she can love again thanks to Julio César Rey, a lawyer at Corporativo Campero, where she is president. However, Antonio's return to Aurora's life, as a shareholder partner of the company, will bring back memories of betrayal and pain from when he left her abandoned at the altar.

== Cast ==
=== Main ===
- Jorge Salinas as Antonio Murrieta
  - Alexis Ceballos as young Antonio
- Natalia Esperón as Aurora Campero
  - Valeria Florian as young Aurora
- Rafael Novoa as Julio César Rey
- Paulina Matos as Helena Murrieta
- Moisés Peñaloza as Ángel Santos / Gabriel
- José Pablo Minor as Demián Morga
- Marisol del Olmo as Jezabel Campero
  - Daniella Cortés as young Jezabel
- Gabriela Rivero as Victoria Bonilla
- Roberto Blandón as Pascual Santos
- Rocío Verdejo as Patricia Gil
- Ligia Uriarte as Briana Querol
- Juan Pablo Gil as Edgar Bautista
- Gabriela Carrillo as Casandra Ávila
- Nubia Martí as Esperanza Castro
- Lalo Palacios as El Morro
- Karla Gómez as Elvia
- Paco Rueda as Glorio
- Christian Ramos as Aquiles Dosamantes
- Priscila Solorio as Maggy Pérez
- Isabela Vázquez as Anita
- Jaden Suárez as El Rolas
- Pablo García as Luis Alberto Rey
- Pedro Sicard as Fabrizio
- René Casados as Juventino Macías "El Pintas"

=== Recurring and guest stars ===
- Leonardo Daniel as Miguel Campero
- Marco Cordero
- Juan Bernardo Flores
- Santiago Durán
- Sebastián Fouilloux

== Production ==
On 25 March 2024, executive producer Roy Rojas announced El ángel de Aurora as the title of the telenovela. It is his first telenovela as sole executive producer. On 15 April 2024, Natalia Esperón, Jorge Salinas, Rafael Novoa were announced in the lead roles. Days later, Paulina Matos, Moisés Peñaloza and José Pablo Minor were confirmed as part of the cast. Filming began on 10 May 2024.

== Episodes ==
| No. | Title | Original release date |
|---|---|---|
| 1 | "¿Dónde está mi hijo?" | 29 July 2024 (Note: Premiered early online through Las Estrellas website on 26 July 2024.) |
Aurora returns to the place where years ago she was going to meet with Antonio Murrieta, the love of her life, so as she stands in front of the house, she remembers how a man took advantage of her. Patricia suffers a nervous breakdown when she receives the news of her divorce from Antonio, Briana tries to help her mother, but she reveals to her that she is faking. Demián is determined to become the new president of the company and warns Edgar that he is capable of taking the job from his aunt Aurora and his mother Jezabel if necessary. Jezabel seeks out Antonio to propose him to become a partner in the company, he rejects her since he has no interest in her company.
| 2 | "No te puedes casar con Aurora" | 30 July 2024 |
In 1994, Aurora and Antonio are excited about their engagement, but Jezabel does not hesitate to speak ill of her sister by assuring that Aurora's goodness cannot be trusted. Jezabel makes her father's employee believe that Aurora is in love with him, so she asks him to go to a house where her sister is already waiting for him. Aurora arrives at her house excited to meet Antonio, but in reality El Pintas is there and rapes her. Jezabel assures Antonio that the son he had with Aurora does not carry his blood, since his sister has always cheated on him.
| 3 | "¿Por qué me odia tanto?" | 31 July 2024 |
When Miguel learns that Gabriel is not Antonio's son, he takes his grandson and gives him to Pascual, but warns him that he must leave town, otherwise he will kill them both. In present day, Patricia begs Antonio not to abandon his family, he assures her that he is only living at home for his daughters, but Helena asks him not to involve her in his marital problems. Aurora fires Helena from the company since she did not authorize her employment, Demián asks his aunt not to involve personal issues with professional ones. Antonio receives a subpoena to testify as a witness in the complaint filed by Aurora.
| 4 | "Aurora fue el amor de mi vida" | 1 August 2024 |
Edgar, seeing Jezabel so stressed, does not hesitate to kiss her to calm her down, but fears that they will be caught by Demián. Helena questions Antonio about Aurora's hatred for her family, he reveals that many years ago she was the great love of his life, but he left her at the altar. Ángel arrives at Corporativo Campero to meet with Helena about the job offer, Aurora sees him and feels a special connection. Ángel accepts to be the image of the campaign that Helena is preparing, so he hugs her in gratitude, Demián finds them together and makes a scene of jealousy to his girlfriend.
| 5 | "Se ve hermosa" | 2 August 2024 |
Antonio accepts that not a day goes by that he reproaches himself for having made a mistake by standing Aurora up at the altar and asks for her forgiveness. Patricia discovers that Briana is sleeping with Demián and complains to her for not telling her earlier and hindering her plans. Demián reacts violently with Ángel when he comes to Helena's defense. Helena comments to Ángel that he should never have confronted the vice president of Corporativo Campero and much less say that he wants her as his girlfriend, he assures her that he spoke from the heart.
| 6 | "Tu hijo está vivo" | 5 August 2024 |
Jezabel asks Patricia to record a video where she discredits Aurora about what happened to her years ago, Briana asks her mother not to do it because it could cause her a lot of harm. Antonio shows Aurora the anonymous letter that assures her that her son is alive, she does not hesitate to share the happy news with Julio César. Demián tries to convince Antonio to become a partner in the company since his investment will make them grow and takes advantage of the moment to confess that Aurora's mental stability has worsened. Patricia uses social media to publicly denounce that Aurora Campero wants to take her husband's love away from her.
| 7 | "Te voy a demandar" | 6 August 2024 |
Demián says goodbye to Helena, but when she hugs him she imagines he is Ángel. Ángel assures Victoria that he has no feelings for his boss since he is just getting to know her. Aurora confronts Patricia for defaming her on social media, Patricia assures her that she did not tell lies since the only thing she is looking for is to get into bed with Antonio. Aurora asks Jezabel to help her forget Antonio, because even though it hurts, she still loves him. Patricia threatens Antonio with making public that he wants to leave her for Aurora Campero, so she throws herself out of the car, causing an accident.
| 8 | "Eres Ángel Gabriel" | 7 August 2024 |
Victoria is determined to confess to Ángel that he comes from a wealthy family, but Pascual prevents her because they could go to jail. Patricia forbids Briana to mention her painful past and threatens her, Briana cannot understand how her mother can cause herself so much harm. Helena sends a text to Ángel to apologize for not answering his messages and asks him to come to the office to make the payment, but inadvertently sends him an image that could be misinterpreted. Aurora can't stop thinking about her son when she is near Ángel, he confesses that he will no longer be the model for the campaign since the owner of the commercial requested it.
| 9 | "¿Y cómo está su hermana Aurora Campero?" | 8 August 2024 |
Jezabel admits to Aurora that on the day of the wedding she spoke to Antonio to ask him to think about marrying her sister even though the child she was expecting was not his. Demián does not control his jealousy when he learns that Helena was in Ángel's arms, Jezabel and Aurora prevent the situation from getting out of control. Julio César reveals to Aurora that he never imagined he would love again the way he is feeling now with her. Helena presents her work to Aurora and asks her not to judge her and to give herself the opportunity to get to know her professionally, Aurora assures her that she will not allow her to be part of her company just because of Demián's nepotism.
| 10 | "Te amo" | 9 August 2024 |
Maggy complains to Helena for texting Ángel and assures her that if Demián finds out she doesn't know how he will react, Helena demands that she not disrespect her again. Jezabel forbids Demián from mentioning the surname Morga. Fabrizio tells Antonio about his plans to win back his son Demián's affection. Antonio receives another anonymous tip, but now he is asked for 50,000 pesos in exchange for revealing the location of Aurora's son. Juventino surprises Jezabel, but since he is not recognized, all he has to do is ask for Aurora Campero for her to remember him.
| 11 | "Cómo puedo pensar que este muchacho es mi hijo" | 12 August 2024 |
In 1994, Don Miguel confirms that it was Jezabel who set Aurora up to get assaulted, Jezabel blames her father for always preferring her sister. In present day, Aurora comments to Demián that she saw the proposal that Helena made to the clients and loved it, so she will take care of talking to Ángel since she also has to approve it. Aurora keeps thinking that Ángel could be her son, she confesses to Julio César that every time she meets a young man Gabriel's age, her maternal instinct comes out. Briana suggests to Ángel that after the game they go to the movies, but when she sees Helena arrive, she lets her know that Ángel asked her out.
| 12 | "¿Con quién engañabas a mi papá?" | 13 August 2024 |
Patricia apologizes to Aurora for the video she posted against her and lashes out at Antonio for threatening to strip her of everything. Helena makes it clear to Briana that she is not jealous that she is also spending time with Ángel and his family and informs her that she has taken a break with Demián. Desperate to win back Helena's love, Demián begs Briana to win Ángel's love and in return he will always be there for her as thanks for getting him out of the way. Demián questions Jezabel about who she was cheating on his father with when they were together, she gets upset and slaps him for the way she spoke to him.
| 13 | "¿Por ella me quieres abandonar?" | 14 August 2024 |
Aurora arrives to the neighborhood where Ángel lives to inform him that he already has a job so he should report to her office first thing in the morning; however, El Morro sees them and does not hesitate to insult them. Briana asks for help because of her mother's mistreatment, Antonio comes to her defense and asks Patricia to stop hurting Briana. Ángel comments to Helena that Aurora looked for him to offer him a job, she celebrates that she will continue to see him and asks him to take advantage of the opportunity. Demián and Edgar give Ángel a humiliating moment, since they assure him that the brand did not want to hire him as a model for fear that he would steal from them.
| 14 | "Gabriel no es mi hijo" | 15 August 2024 |
Aurora questions Ángel about his birthplace and reveals that years ago she had a son and today, he would be the same age as him, but unfortunately he was taken from her arms. Julio César presents his resignation to Jezabel, she does not want him to leave and to convince him to stay, she promises to help him so that Aurora marries him. Antonio reveals to Aurora that he left her at the altar because Jezabel showed him a DNA test which proved that Gabriel was not his son.
| 15 | "¿Por qué le sacaste una prueba de ADN a mi hijo?" | 16 August 2024 |
Maggy feels compelled by Ángel to apologize to Helena for the trouble she caused her, Helena assures her that all is forgotten. Jezabel forbids Demián from continuing to see his father, as he is a man who can do him a lot of harm. Demián tries to surprise Helena with a romantic video of everything they have experienced as a couple, but she can't get Ángel's confession out of her mind. Aurora slaps Jezabel for having performed a DNA test on her son Gabriel and sharing the results with Antonio.
| 16 | "El hijo de tu hermana está vivo" | 19 August 2024 |
Aurora confronts Jezabel and assures her that she messes everything up for her own convenience and swears that she will go to the last consequences, so she hopes that she is telling the truth for her own good. Demián surprises Helena with romantic details with the intention of another chance; however, she is adamant about the decision she made. Briana insists on dating Ángel. Jezabel meets with Juventino and he informs her that Aurora's son is alive and he knows where to find him. Jezabel assures Antonio that Aurora only wants Julio César as a friend, so this is his chance to conquer her and swears that if he gives her sister back her hope, she will make sure the two of them get married.
| 17 | "Jezabel es una arpía" | 20 August 2024 |
Briana opens her heart to Ángel and confesses that years ago her family had no money and unfortunately her father was aggressive with her mother. Demián arrives at Antonio's house to talk to Fabrizio, but when he enters his bedroom he finds him in danger and helps him, he begs him not to reject him. Jezabel gets upset with Aurora for having removed their father's photograph and reminds her that it is also her house, but Aurora does not fall into provocations. Aurora presents her business proposal, but apparently the information is wrong and Demián takes advantage of the moment to show that she is not prepared; however, Helena saves her.
| 18 | "Me encantas Helena" | 21 August 2024 |
Antonio decides to call the psychiatric hospital where Fabrizio was being treated, but he confesses that he escaped. Patricia reveals to Jezabel that Demián's father is living in her house. Aurora is sure that she was not wrong about the statistics in her presentation and warns that she will find the culprit; Demián accepts that it was the opportunity he found to get his aunt out of the company. Ángel steals a kiss from Helena, but she assures him that they got caught up in the moment. Jezabel surprises Fabrizio in his room. Antonio reveals to Aurora that the day Jezabel gave him Gabriel's DNA test she confessed to him that she was in love with him.
| 19 | "No le cuentes a Patricia detalles de tu vida" | 22 August 2024 |
Aurora cannot understand that her sister Jezabel is full of hate, so when she sees her, she kicks her out of the house. Juventino does not hesitate to make uncomfortable comments to Helena, but Ángel stops him and advises him that he respects her, both begin to fight, but Pascual separates them. Aurora no longer allows herself to be manipulated by Jezabel and warns her that if she discovers another deception she will take her out of the house. Antonio begs Fabrizio not to tell Patricia anything since she does not know about his past. Ángel is determined that Aurora should meet his parents.
| 20 | "¿Quién es el Pintas?" | 23 August 2024 |
Ángel introduces Aurora to his parents and Pascual, upon seeing her, has no doubt that she is Ángel's mother. Helena tells Aurora that the person accompanying her father is Fabrizio Morgan, she gets excited and greets him. Patricia makes a scandal in the restaurant where Aurora is with Antonio to expose her as a home wrecker, Helena tries to calm the situation, but Patricia takes it out on her. Helena shares with Aurora that she has had a very stressful day from what happened with Patricia to what happened with Pintas, Aurora is shocked to hear his name.
| 21 | "Cáncer de hueso" | 26 August 2024 |
Jezabel refuses to give Demián any explanation about the identity of Pintas, he believes that it is her lover and after a heated discussion, Demián assures his mother that he would rather be with his father than with her. Demián recognizes that he does not know what the love of a family is, so he will not allow Helena to walk away from his life since he needs her love. Helena comes clean with Damián and confesses that Ángel kissed her and she reciprocated, he surprises her with his reaction and assures her that true love generates peace and that is what he wants to give her now that they have decided to take some time apart. After analyzing the tests performed on Victoria, the doctor informs Ángel that everything indicates that his mother has bone cancer.
| 22 | "¿Así sería mi hijo?" | 27 August 2024 |
Luis Alberto surprises Jezabel in her office and she doesn't hesitate to make him nervous, so she invites him to keep visiting her. Aurora thanks Julio César for always protecting her in dangerous situations, he steals a kiss. Demián confesses to his father that Jezabel turned against him during one of the most important decisions of the company, Fabrizio asks him to stay away from her since she is a woman who destroys everything. Aurora is upset to hear Antonio say that together they are going to find Gabriel, when in reality he left her alone and had to deal with her father's prejudices.
| 23 | "Me dieron ganas de saludar a Aurora" | 28 August 2024 |
Aurora reproaches Antonio for having doubted his paternity and their love for each other because of a phone call, she slaps him, but he swears that he will help her find Gabriel. Helena assures Ángel that she has many doubts, he swears that Briana is only his friend and his heart only belongs to her. Jezabel states to the reporters that she is willing to help her sister Aurora to find the man who hurt her and asks all women not to remain silent, she also sends a message to Patricia. Juventino arrives at Aurora's company and when he sees her leaving with Julio César, he shouts her name and she is shocked to hear his voice.
| 24 | "El hijo de Aurora puede estar vivo" | 29 August 2024 |
Helena doesn't understand how Jezabel wants to take Aurora out of the company, but at the same time supports her in her cause, Demián comes out in defense of his mother and assures her that their relationship is very similar to hers with Briana, that sometimes they love and sometimes they hate each other, but Helena surprises him with her answer. Demián takes advantage of Antonio's presence to formally ask for Helena's hand in marriage. Briana asks Demián to leave Ángel alone since his mother may have cancer, Demián knows this is the best time to attack him. Jezabel assures Demián that thanks to everything she did, her sister trusted her again and confesses that Aurora's son could be alive.
| 25 | "Quiero evitar que acabes con tu madre" | 30 August 2024 |
Jezabel confesses to Demián that she paid the association's detective to distort Gabriel's portrait so they can't find him, otherwise their inheritance is in danger. Helena complains to Briana for having shown a video of her with Demián to Ángel, Briana assures her that Ángel's arrival changed her life and that is why she distanced herself from Demián. Fabrizio accepts in front of Demián that he killed his father and assures him that he does not want him to go through the same thing by having a mother like Jezabel. El Morro puts Demián's plan into action and beats Ángel, Briana tries to ask for help, but is threatened.
| 26 | "Yo le dije a mi papá que te propusiera matrimonio" | 2 September 2024 |
Juventino goes to Ángel's house to reveal that someone sent for him to be beaten, Pascual sees him in an inconvenient state and decides to kick him out of the house. Pascual confronts El Morro for having beaten Ángel and threatens him if he ever messes with his son again. Patricia tries to belittle Ángel because of his economic position, he assures her that he is not a starving person since there has never been a lack of food in his house. Luis Alberto tells Aurora that he is the one with the ideas in the house, so much so that he advised his father to propose to her.
| 27 | "Enfrenta el miedo" | 3 September 2024 |
Luis Alberto assures Aurora that if she marries his father she will also have to accept him, since he will not allow her to take him away from his only family. Helena reveals to Ángel that if she kissed him it was because she was confused and reiterates that if he has another problem at the office, she will ask for his resignation. Demián arrives at Edgar's house and finds his mother dressed in a very provocative way, so he confirms that Jezabel and his best friend have a sentimental relationship. Aurora recognizes that Antonio is the love of her life, Helena, listening to how she expresses herself about her father, confirms that she is in love with Ángel.
| 28 | "Helena me gusta y quiero luchar por ella" | 4 September 2024 |
Demián suggests that for company security reasons Ángel should not come to work, Aurora comes to his defense and assures him that she knows him very well and will not allow him to be fired. Cassandra tells her colleagues that Aurora and Ángel are a couple, and also reveals that Demián and Briana are also fond of each other. Jezabel wants to contribute some of her money to her sister's foundation, but Aurora rejects her good will and assures her that she doesn't need it. Jezabel decides to get Detective Rocha out of her way as he can cause her a lot of trouble with Aurora. Ángel confesses to Briana that he is only interested in Helena.
| 29 | "No viene hablarte de amor" | 5 September 2024 |
Briana, feeling Ángel's rejection, assures him that Helena only toyed with him since she is about to marry Demián. Helena asks her father if the child stolen from Aurora was his or the man who hurt her, he confesses that it was the man who abused her. Demián receives a message confirming the death of Detective Rocha, he immediately concludes that his mother is the only one to blame. Ángel looks for Helena under the excuse of work, but she asks him to leave since she is busy with Ana.
| 30 | "¿Aceptarías ser mi esposa?" | 6 September 2024 |
Ángel takes off his shirt after working out and Helena is surprised to see how toned his body is. Demián proposes to Helena and gives her an engagement ring, he asks her to have a big wedding, but she prefers something more intimate. Luis Alberto confesses to Jezabel that he loves her, she laughs at his feelings and assures him that it is not true and prefers to kiss him. Julio César serenades Aurora, she is moved to hear him and goes out to thank him, but Antonio accompanies her and Julio is upset to see him.
| 31 | "Aurora está sufriendo por nuestra culpa" | 9 September 2024 |
| 32 | "Luis Alberto perdió la vida" | 10 September 2024 |
| 33 | "Ruega para que no aparezca tu primo" | 11 September 2024 |
| 34 | "Ángel puede ser el hijo que le robaron" | 12 September 2024 |
| 35 | "Ese día había un hombre llamado Juventino" | 13 September 2024 |
| 36 | "Él no es el hombre ideal para mi hija" | 16 September 2024 |
| 37 | "Quiero que seas mi esposa" | 17 September 2024 |
| 38 | "No puedo casarme contigo" | 18 September 2024 |
| 39 | "La vida me está castigando" | 19 September 2024 |
| 40 | "¡Nadie toca mis acciones!" | 20 September 2024 |
| 41 | "Al enemigo se le tiene cerca" | 23 September 2024 |
| 42 | "¿Por qué te quieres deshacer de él?" | 24 September 2024 |
| 43 | "Ese encargo no puede esperar" | 25 September 2024 |
| 44 | "Solo quería decirte que te amo" | 26 September 2024 |
| 45 | "No permitas que Helena viva con un hombre peligroso" | 27 September 2024 |
| 46 | "Es necesario que Helena y Ángel se separen" | 30 September 2024 |
| 47 | "¿Quieres que me aleje de Helena?" | 2 October 2024 |
| 48 | "Nada nos puede separar" | 3 October 2024 |
| 49 | "¿Quieres que empiece a odiarte?" | 4 October 2024 |
| 50 | "Le arruinaste la vida a tu propia hermana" | 7 October 2024 |
| 51 | "Arruinaste mi vida" | 8 October 2024 |
| 52 | "Demián está en peligro" | 9 October 2024 |
| 53 | "¿Por qué me dejaste?" | 10 October 2024 |
| 54 | "Mi madre me acusa de algo terrible" | 11 October 2024 |
| 55 | "Pascual sabe quién es el atacante de Aurora" | 14 October 2024 |
| 56 | "¡Julio César vamos a casarnos!" | 15 October 2024 |
| 57 | "¡Angél es Gabriel!" | 16 October 2024 |
| 58 | "¡Es el hijo de Aurora Campero!" | 17 October 2024 |
| 59 | "Mi hijo está aquí" | 18 October 2024 |
| 60 | "Esta noche puede conocer a su hijo" | 21 October 2024 |
| 61 | "No me toque nadie" | 22 October 2024 |
| 62 | "¡Ángel y yo ya somos novios!" | 23 October 2024 |
| 63 | "Decidí luchar por mi felicidad" | 24 October 2024 |
| 64 | "Que seas la mujer más feliz del universo" | 25 October 2024 |
| 65 | "No vuelvas a insultar a Ángel" | 28 October 2024 |
| 66 | "Ese hombre ha enviado los anónimos" | 29 October 2024 |
| 67 | "Eres un gran hombre" | 30 October 2024 |
| 68 | "Mis acciones van a pasar a mi hijo Gabriel" | 31 October 2024 |
| 69 | "¿Cómo me vas a entregar a Gabriel?" | 1 November 2024 |
| 70 | "¿Por qué le regalaste una casa?" | 4 November 2024 |
| 71 | "Voy a impedir la boda de Helena y Demián" | 5 November 2024 |
| 72 | "Te casaste con Helena por capricho" | 6 November 2024 |
| 73 | "¡Ángel es Gabriel!" | 7 November 2024 |
| 74 | "¡Se murió mi mamá!" | 8 November 2024 |
| 75 | "No eres un Campero" | 11 November 2024 |
| 76 | "Te voy a meter a la cárcel" | 12 November 2024 |
| 77 | "Tu mamá es Aurora Campero" | 13 November 2024 |
| 78 | "Ángel es hijo de El Pintas" | 14 November 2024 |
| 79 | "¿El Pintas es el padre de su hijo?" | 15 November 2024 |
| 80 | "¡Yo soy Gabriel Campero!" | 18 November 2024 |
| 81 | "Vengo a denunciar a Jezabel Campero" | 19 November 2024 |
| 82 | "Sigue amando a Antonio" | 20 November 2024 |
| 83 | "Te necesito mamá" | 21 November 2024 |
| 84 | "¡Ángel Gabriel, qué bonito nombre!" | 22 November 2024 |
| 85 | "¡Es el mismísimo diablo!" | 25 November 2024 |
| 86 | "Aléjate de esa mujer" | 26 November 2024 |
| 87 | "¡Estoy casada!" | 27 November 2024 |
| 88 | "Vas a tener tres papás" | 28 November 2024 |
| 89 | "Un fantasma del pasado" | 29 November 2024 |
| 90 | "Quiero que perdones a tu abuelo" | 2 December 2024 |
| 91 | "Acaba con los dos" | 3 December 2024 |
| 92 | "Al final mi hijo te quiere tanto" | 4 December 2024 |
| 93 | "¡No te mueras mamá!" | 5 December 2024 |
| 94 | "Es una desgracia" | 6 December 2024 |
| 95 | "¡Te gané Teté!" | 9 December 2024 |
| 96 | "No te voy a permitir ni un engaño" | 10 December 2024 |
| 97 | "Siempre te haces la ofendida" | 11 December 2024 |
| 98 | "¡Fue Jezabel!" | 12 December 2024 |
| 99 | "Deja que Antonio conquiste a Aurora" | 13 December 2024 |
| 100 | "¡Ayúdame a vengarme de Jezabel!" | 16 December 2024 |
| 101 | "¡Me estás lastimando Demián!" | 17 December 2024 |
| 102 | "Jezabel lo autorizó" | 18 December 2024 |
| 103 | "Te voy a hacer pagar por esto, Demián" | 19 December 2024 |
| 104 | "Me voy a cobrar todo lo que me hiciste" | 20 December 2024 |
| 105 | "Te voy a destrozar Pintas" | 23 December 2024 |
| 106 | "Te voy a ceder todas mis acciones" | 24 December 2024 |
| 107 | "Helena se va a divorciar" | 25 December 2024 |
| 108 | "Esto se llama nepotismo" | 26 December 2024 |
| 109 | "Me voy a vengar de todos" | 27 December 2024 |
| 110 | "No eras quien yo creía" | 30 December 2024 |
| 111 | "La sangre no nos define" | 31 December 2024 |
| 112 | "Ángel lleva mi sangre" | 1 January 2025 |
| 113 | "La pieza que nos falta" | 2 January 2025 |
| 114 | "La soledad que me consume el alma" | 3 January 2025 |
| 115 | "¿Acabaste con mi papá?" | 6 January 2025 |
| 116 | "El único culpable es el Pintas" | 7 January 2025 |
| 117 | "Si en verdad lo ama, se apartaría de él" | 8 January 2025 |
| 118 | "Ahora entiendo tu odio" | 9 January 2025 |
| 119 | "No te vayas Julio César" | 10 January 2025 |
| 120 | "¡Jezabel es la culpable!" | 13 January 2025 |
| 121 | "Ángel nunca te engañó" | 14 January 2025 |
| 122 | "¡Adiós amor mío!" | 15 January 2025 |
| 123 | "Me tienes harto" | 16 January 2025 |
| 124 | "No puedo casarme contigo" | 17 January 2025 |
| 125 | "¡No me casé con Briana!" | 20 January 2025 |
| 126 | "Se me está olvidando que eres mi mamá" | 21 January 2025 |
| 127 | "Eres un traidor Demián" | 22 January 2025 |
| 128 | "¡Estoy libre!" | 23 January 2025 |
| 129 | "Ya sufrí mucho" | 24 January 2025 |
| 130 | "No te van a vencer Jezabel" | 27 January 2025 |
| 131 | "Quiero ser feliz junto a ti" | 28 January 2025 |
| 132 | "Yo te ofrecí al albañil" | 29 January 2025 |
| 133 | "Vengo a denunciar a Jezabel Campero" | 30 January 2025 |
| 134 | "Nos necesitamos Pintas" | 31 January 2025 |
| 135 | "Mi hijo Gabriel y su primo juntos" | 2 February 2025 |
| 136 | "Eres el amor de mi vida y te amo" | 2 February 2025 |
