= Sofía dame tiempo =

- Genre: Telenovela; Drama
- Starring: Karen Martínez; Rafael Novoa; Ana María Trujillo; Salvo Basile; Marcela Gallego; Katherine Vélez; Alejandro López
- Opening theme: "Dame tiempo" by Cadavid
- Countries of origin: United States; Colombia
- Original language: Spanish
- No. of episodes: 130

Production
- Production locations: Bogotá, Colombia
- Running time: 42-45 minutes

Original release
- Network: Telemundo; Caracol Televisión
- Release: March 3 – October 7, 2003

Related
- Daniela; Pasión de gavilanes

Sofía dame tiempo is a Colombian telenovela produced by RTI for Caracol Televisión and Telemundo in 2003. It was a remake of the telenovela El último beso.

== Cast ==
- Karen Martínez as Sofía Santero
- Rafael Novoa as Santiago Rodríguez Salazar
- Ana María Trujillo as Francesca Sabina
- Alejandro López as Nicolás Pardo
- Orlando Fundichely as Antonio 'Toño' Rivas
- Ana Laverde as Valeria Sabina
- Mayte Vilán as Victoria Guerrero
- Salvo Basile as Salvatore Sabina
- Marcela Gallego as Fabiola de Neira
- Pedro Mogollón as Santos Neira
- Katherine Vélez as Adela Salazar viuda de Rodríguez
- Víctor Cifuentes as Gregorio Manrique
- Carlos Hurtado as Dairo García
- Astrid Hernández as Marilyn Monroy
- Orlando Lamboglia as Teodolindo 'Teo' Caro
- Cecilia Navia as Rosa Torres
- Claudia Liliana Gonzalez as Pilar Amaya
- Claudia Arroyave as Juliana Rodríguez Salazar
- Saín Castro as Aníbal Zapata
- Salvatore Cassandro as Chancho Panza
- Ramiro Meneses as Teniente Pinzón
- Santiago Alarcón as Rodrigo
- Juan del Mar as Diosdao
- Julio del Mar as José 'Pepe' Pardo
- Rosa Garavito as Ubaldina
- María José Martínez as Tatiana Neira
- Toto Vega as Sargento Díaz
- Rolando Tarajano as Manuel Manrique
