= Dos Idolos =

Compilation album by Marco Antonio Solís & Pepe Aguilar
- Released: September 27, 2005
- Genre: Pop Latino / Ranchera
- Label: Univision

Marco Antonio Solís & Pepe Aguilar chronology
La Historia Continúa... Parte II (2005)	Dos Idolos (2005)	La Historia Continúa... Parte III (2007)

Dos Idolos (Eng.: Two Idols) is a compilation album released by Marco Antonio Solís and Pepe Aguilar on September 27, 2005.

== Track listing ==
No.	Title	Writer(s)	Length
1.	"Tu Amor o Tu Desprecio"	Marco Antonio Solís	3:17
2.	"Me Falta Valor"	Pepe Aguilar
3.	"O Me Voy o Te Vas"	Marco Antonio Solís	4:49
4.	"Yo la Amo"	Pepe Aguilar
5.	"La Venia Bendita"	Marco Antonio Solís	3:13
6.	"Cruz de Olvido"	Pepe Aguilar
7.	"Te Me Vas"	Marco Antonio Solís	3:53
8.	"He Venido a Pedirte Perdón"	Pepe Aguilar
9.	"Más Que Tu Amigo"	Marco Antonio Solís	3:32
10.	"Cielo Rojo"	Pepe Aguilar
11.	"Si No Te Hubieras Ido"	Marco Antonio Solís	4:49
12.	"Echame a Mi la Culpa"	Pepe Aguilar

== Charts ==
Chart (2005)	Peak position
US Billboard 200	198
US Top Latin Albums (Billboard)	8
US Latin Pop Albums (Billboard)	5
