= Por Amor a Morelia Michoacán =

Live album by Marco Antonio Solís
- Released: October 23, 2015
- Recorded: 2012
- Genre: Latin
- Label: Habari Inc
- Producer: Marco Antonio Solís

Marco Antonio Solís chronology
15 Inolvidables Vol. 2 (2015)	Por Amor a Morelia Michoacán (2015)	40 Años (2016)

Por Amor a Morelia Michoacán is a live album released by Marco Antonio Solís from Plaza Monumental de Morelia in Morelia, Michoacán, Mexico on October 23, 2015. A DVD was also included with the deluxe edition.

== Track listing ==
All songs written and composed by Marco Antonio Solís

No.	Title	Length
1.	"Introducción Musical"	02:01
2.	"Necesito Una Compañera"	03:43
3.	"Quiéreme/Acepto Mi Derrota"	05:18
4.	"Hay de Amores a Amores"	03:50
5.	"Mi Eterno Amor Secreto"	03:58
6.	"Viva el Amor"	04:07
7.	"Invéntame"	03:46
8.	"Presiento Que Voy a Llorar/Ladron de Buena Suerte"	04:37
9.	"Pirekua Michoacána"	04:49
10.	"Mi Mayor Necesidad/A Donde Vayas"	04:44
11.	"Tú Me Vuelves Loco"	03:39
12.	"A Dónde Vamos a Parar"	03:54
13.	"Navidad Sin Ti"	04:18

== DVD ==
No.	Title	Length
1.	"Introducción Musical"
2.	"Necesito Una Compañera"
3.	"Quiéreme/Acepto Mi Derrota"
4.	"Hay de Amores a Amores"
5.	"Mi Eterno Amor Secreto"
6.	"Viva el Amor"
7.	"Invéntame"
8.	"Presiento Que Voy a Llorar/Ladron de Buena Suerte"
9.	"Pirekua Michoacána"
10.	"Mi Mayor Necesidad/A Donde Vayas"
11.	"Tú Me Vuelves Loco"
12.	"A Dónde Vamos a Parar"
13.	"Navidad Sin Ti"

== Charts ==
Chart (2015)	Peak position
US Top Latin Albums (Billboard)	4
US Regional Mexican Albums (Billboard)	2
