= Mañana es para siempre =

Television series

- Genre: Telenovela; Drama; Romance
- Created by: Kary Fajer
- Based on: Pura sangre by Mauricio Navas and Guillermo Restrepo
- Written by: Gerardo Luna
- Directed by: Salvador Garcini; Ricardo de la Parra
- Starring: Lucero; Fernando Colunga; Sergio Sendel; Silvia Navarro
- Theme music composer: Eduardo Murguía; Mauricio Arriaga
- Opening theme: "Mañana es para siempre" performed by Alejandro Fernández
- Country of origin: Mexico
- Original language: Spanish
- No. of episodes: 160

Production
- Executive producer: Nicandro Díaz González
- Producers: María del Carmen Marcos; Antonio Arvizú
- Production locations: Mexico City, Mexico
- Cinematography: Alejandro Frutos; Gabriel Vázquez Bulman
- Editors: Pablo Peralta; Susana Valencia
- Camera setup: Multi-camera
- Production company: Televisa

Original release
- Network: Canal de las Estrellas
- Release: October 20, 2008 – June 12, 2009

Related
- Fuego en la sangre; Sortilegio; Pura sangre

Mañana es para siempre (English title: Tomorrow Is Forever) is a Mexican telenovela produced by Nicandro Díaz González for Televisa in 2008. It is an adaption of the 2007 Colombian telenovela Pura sangre. It aired on Canal de las Estrellas from October 20, 2008 to June 12, 2009.

Lucero, Fernando Colunga, Sergio Sendel and Silvia Navarro star in this telenovela.

Univision aired Mañana es para siempre weeknights at 9pm/8c from February 23, 2009 to October 5, 2009. The finale on Univision was watched by over 11 million viewers, faring well against US mainstream shows.

== Cast ==
=== Main ===
- Lucero as Bárbara Greco "The Hyena" / Rebeca Sánchez
- Fernando Colunga as Eduardo Juárez Cruz / Franco Santoro
  - Omar Yubeili as Child Eduardo Juárez Cruz
- Sergio Sendel as Damián Gallardo
- Silvia Navarro as Fernanda Elizalde Rivera
  - Violeta Puga as Child Fernanda Elizalde Rivera

=== Also main ===
- Guillermo Capetillo as Aníbal Elizalde Rivera / Jerónimo Elizalde
  - Alberich as Young Aníbal Elizalde Rivera
- Mario Iván Martínez as Steve Norton
- Dominika Paleta as Liliana Elizalde Rivera
  - Nancy Patiño as Young Liliana Elizalde Rivera
- Roberto Palazuelos as Camilo Elizalde Rivera
  - Hendrik Mariné as Young Camilo Elizalde Rivera
- Arleth Terán as Priscila Alvear
- Marisol del Olmo as Erika Astorga
- Carlos de la Mota as Santiago Elizalde Rivera
  - Ángel Mar as Child Santiago Elizalde Rivera
- Alejandro Ruiz as Jacinto Cordero
  - Brayam Alejandro as Child Jacinto Cordero
- Dacia Arcaraz as Margarita Campillo
- Aleida Núñez as Gardenia Campillo
- Claudia Ortega as Flor "Florecita" Campillo
- Luis Bayardo as Ciro Palafox
- Jaime Garza as Silvestre Tinoco
- Mariana Ríos as Martina
- Benjamín Rivero as Lucio Bermejo
- Janet Ruiz as Adolfina
- Ricardo Silva as Dr. Plutarco Obregón
- Jackeline Arroyo as Tomasa
- Erika Buenfil as Monserrat Rivera de Elizalde
- Rogelio Guerra as Gonzalo Elizalde / Artemio Bravo

=== Recurring and guest stars ===
- Elizabeth Aguilar as La Madamme
- Hilda Aguirre as Graciela Palafox
- Enrique Borja Jr. as Rubiel Villasana
- Carlos Cámara Jr. as Jacobo Roa
- Julio Camejo as Herminio
- Ofelia Cano as Doña Dolores "Dolly" #2
- Rudy Casanova as Carpio
- Juan Carlos Casasola as Graciano
- Yolanda Cianni as Doña Úrsula
- Eugenio Cobo as Lawyer Elizondo
- Ricardo Cortés as Morales
- Roger Cudney as U.S. Ambassador
- Rafael del Villar as Simón Palafox
- Jorge de Marín as Ubaldo
- Ricardo de Pascual as Father Íñigo
- Ariadne Díaz as Aurora
- Josefina Echánove as Rosenda 'The Witch'
- Juan Antonio Edwards as Grajales
- Humberto Elizondo as Don Agustín Astorga
- Esteban Franco as Osvaldo
- Cecilia Gabriela as Altagracia de Elizalde
- Luis Gimeno as Father Bosco
- Filippa Giordano as herself
- Aracely Guízar as Julieta
- Salvador Ibarra as Dr. Carlos Rey
- Archie Lanfranco as Rolando Alvear
- Andrea Legarreta as herself
- Enrique Lizalde as Judge
- Ignacio López Tarso as Isaac Newton
- Jaime Lozano as Jairo Roca
- Marina Marín as Purificación "Purita" López
- Tanneke Mariscal as Nadia
- Edith Márquez as Julieta Sotomayor
- Ana Martín as Rosario
- María Morena as Sister Fidelia
- Lourdes Munguía as Doña Dolores "Dolly" #1
- Haydée Navarra as Nurse Sofía
- Rafael Novoa as Miguel Lascuráin
- Adanely Núñez as Ana Gregoria Bravo
- Adalberto Parra as René Manzanares
- María Prado as Dominga Ojeda
- David Rencoret as Commander Loyola
- Norma Reyna as Doña Filo
- Fabián Robles as Vladimir Piñeiro
- Adriana Rojo as Chief Nun
- Gustavo Rojo as Bishop
- María Rojo as Soledad Cruz
- Cecilia Romo as Nurse
- Mariana Seoane as Chelsey
- Teo Tapia as Director Curiel
- Rodrigo Tejeda as Jaime Correa
- Tanya Vázquez as Venus García / Lovely Norton
- Pedro Weber "Chatanuga" as Tobías
- Zaneta as Natasha Baeza
- Víctor Luis Zúñiga as Juan David

== DVD releases ==
A DVD version was released in Mexico and the U.S in May 2010. The box set contains 4 discs with a total running time of 815 minutes.

== Awards and nominations ==
Year	Award	Category	Nominee(s)	Result
2008	TV Adicto Golden Awards	Best Special Performance	María Rojo	Won
2008	TV Adicto Golden Awards	Best Female Villain	Lucero	Won
2009	People en Español Awards	Telenovela of the Year	Mañana es para siempre	Won
2009	People en Español Awards	Best Actress	Silvia Navarro	Nominated
2009	People en Español Awards	Best Actor	Fernando Colunga	Won
2009	People en Español Awards	Best Female or Male Villain	Lucero	Won
2009	People en Español Awards	Best Female or Male Villain	Sergio Sendel	Nominated
2009	People en Español Awards	Best Young Lead Actress or Actor	Ariadne Díaz	Nominated
2009	People en Español Awards	Surprise of the Year	Silvia Navarro	Won
2009	People en Español Awards	Couple of the Year	Silvia Navarro; Fernando Colunga	Won
2009	People en Español Awards	Best Remake	Mañana es para siempre	Won
2009	Copa Televisa	Best Telenovela	Nicandro Díaz González	Won
2010	TVyNovelas Awards			
2010	TVyNovelas Awards	Best Telenovela	Nicandro Díaz González	Nominated
2010	TVyNovelas Awards	Best Actress	Lucero	Nominated
2010	TVyNovelas Awards	Best Actor	Fernando Colunga	Nominated
2010	TVyNovelas Awards	Best Antagonist Actor	Rogelio Guerra	Nominated
2010	TVyNovelas Awards	Best Leading Actor	Luis Gimeno	Won
2010	TVyNovelas Awards	Best Co-lead Actor	Mario Iván Martínez	Nominated
2010	TVyNovelas Awards	Best Musical Theme	"Mañana es para siempre" by Alejandro Fernández	Nominated
2010	Latin ACE Awards	Best Supporting Actress	Lucero	Won
