= La Más Completa Colección (Marco Antonio Solís album) =

La Más Completa Coleccion

Compilation album by Marco Antonio Solís
- Released: January 26, 2009
- Recorded: 1996 – 2006
- Genre: Latin
- Label: Fonovisa
- Producer: Marco Antonio Solís

Marco Antonio Solís chronology
Una Noche en Madrid (2008)	La Más Completa Coleccion (2009)	Más de Marco Antonio Solís (2009)

La Más Completa Coleccion is a compilation album released by Marco Antonio Solís on January 26, 2009.

== Track listing ==
=== Disc 1 ===
All songs written and composed by Marco Antonio Solís

No.	Title	Length
1.	"Antes de Que Te Vayas"	04:15
2.	"Mi Mayor Sacrificio"	04:05
3.	"Cuando Te Acuerdes de Mi"	04:42
4.	"El Peor de Mis Fracasos"	04:15
5.	"Se Que Me Va a Dejar"	04:21
6.	"Pidemelo Todo"	03:41
7.	"Nuestra Confesión"	03:26
8.	"A Que Me Quedo Contigo"	04:20
9.	"Desde Afuera"	04:14
10.	"Ojala"	03:46
11.	"La Ultima Parte"	04:38
12.	"No Puedo Olvidarla"	04:05
13.	"Se Que Te Irá Mejor"	04:11
14.	"Razón de Sobra"	04:11
15.	"Tu Hombre Perfecto"	04:24

=== Disc 2 ===
All songs written by Marco Antonio Solís

No.	Title	Length
1.	"Si Te Pudiera Mentir"	04:25
2.	"Desde Que Te Perdí"	03:43
3.	"Resignacion"	03:49
4.	"Recuerdos, Tristeza y Soledad"	04:31
5.	"Que Pena Me Das"	04:11
6.	"O Me Voy o Te Vas"	04:50
7.	"Mujeres Solitas"	03:26
8.	"Invéntame"	03:32
9.	"Me Vas a Hacer Llorar"	03:26
10.	"Para Que Seas Feliz"	04:55
11.	"Sin Lado Izquierdo"	04:21
12.	"Asi Como Te Conoci"	04:24
13.	"En Desventaja"	03:23
14.	"En el Mismo Tren"	04:11
15.	"Sigue Sin Mi"	04:01
