= Now Esto Es Musica! Latino 4 =

Compilation album by Various artists
- Released: March 24, 2009
- Genre: Latin pop, reggaeton, merengue, bachata
- Label: Sony U.S. Latin

Series chronology
Now That's What I Call Power Ballads (2009)	Now Esto Es Musica! Latino 4 (2009)	Now That's What I Call Music! 31 (2009)

Latino chronology
Now Esto Es Musica! Latino 3 (2007)	Now Esto Es Musica! Latino 4 (2009)

Now Esto Es Musica! Latino 4 is a compilation album released on March 24, 2009, and the fourth in a series of Latin-themed editions in the US version of the Now! series.

The song, "Te Quiero", was first featured in a Now-series album on Now! 28, while "Mi Corazoncito" also appeared on Now Esto Es Musica! Latino 3.

== Track listing ==
1. Enrique Iglesias – "¿Dónde Están Corazón?"
2. Reik – "Inolvidable"
3. Luis Fonsi – "No Me Doy Por Vencido"
4. Kany García – "Estigma De Amor"
5. Flex featuring Belinda – "Te Quiero"
6. Juanes – "Odio Por Amor"
7. Chayanne – "Amor Inmortal"
8. Juan Luis Guerra – "Como Yo"
9. Calle 13 featuring Café Tacuba– "No Hay Nadie Como Tú"
10. R.K.M & Ken-Y – "Te Regalo Amores"
11. Franco De Vita – "Mi Sueño"
12. Los Temerarios – "Luz De Luna"
13. Aventura – "Mi Corazoncito"
14. Marco Antonio Solís – "No Molestar"
15. Xtreme – "Shorty Shorty"
16. Lola – "Si Me Besas"

== Charts ==
=== Weekly charts ===
Chart (2009)	Peak position
US Billboard 200	165
US Top Latin Albums (Billboard)	3
US Latin Pop Albums (Billboard)	1

=== Year-end charts ===
Chart (2009)	Position
US Top Latin Albums (Billboard)	41
