= Pura sangre (Colombian TV series) =

Colombian television series

- Genre: Telenovela
- Written by: Mauricio Navas; Conchita Ruiz; Tania Cárdenas
- Directed by: Herney Luna
- Starring: Rafael Novoa; Marcela Mar; Kathy Sáenz; Pepe Sánchez
- Opening theme: Rase for Survival (instrumental)
- Country of origin: Colombia
- Original language: Spanish
- No. of episodes: 104

Production
- Producer: Guillermo Restrepo
- Production locations: Bogotá, Colombia
- Running time: 60 minutes

Original release
- Network: RCN Televisión
- Release: August 14, 2007 – March 26, 2008

Related
- Mañana es para siempre

Pura sangre (English title: Thoroughbred: Between the Justice and Revenge) is a Colombian telenovela produced and broadcast by RCN Televisión in 2007.

== Cast ==
- Rafael Novoa as Eduardo Montenegro / Marco Vieira
- Marcela Mar as Florencia Lagos
- Kathy Sáenz as Paulina Riascos/Regina Castaño "La Hiena"
- Pepe Sánchez as Don Alejandro Lagos / Don Eusebio Beltrán
- Helga Díaz as Irene Lagos
- Juan Pablo Gamboa as Federico Lagos / Pedronel Lagos
- Andrés Juan as Camilo Lagos
- Manuel José Chávez as Simón Lagos
- Silvia de Dios as Susana Suescún de Lagos
- Edgardo Román as Atila Carranza
- Alejandro López as Renato León
- Carlos Hurtado as Aristides Bocanegra
- Juliana Galvis as Silvia Vallejo
- Carolina Cuervo as Azucena Flores de Chaparro
- Alejandra Sandoval as Lucía Velandia (Beltrán Castaño)
- Carlos Manuel Vesga as Isidro Chaparro
- Fernando Arévalo as Dr. Ortegón
- Jenny Osorio as Margarita Flores
- Marcela Benjumea as Rosa Flores
- Manuel Sarmiento as Samuel Delgado
- Diego Vélez as Padre Matías
- Ramsés Ramos as Freddy William
- Claudia Aguirre as Iliana
- Inés Prieto as Inés Bueno
- María Fernanda Yepes as Natalia / Venus
- Renata González as Marcela Carranza
- Jason Bawth Chad as Mike Horton
- Margalida Castro as Clotilde
- Jaime Barbini as José María Cabal
- Alejandra Borrero as Genoveva de Lagos
- Carmenza Gómez as María de Montenegro
- Martina García as Ana Gregoria Beltrán
- Laura Perico as Irene Lagos (young)
- Etty Grossman as Florencia Lagos (young)
- Federico Rivera as Kojac

== Awards and nominations ==
=== Prêmio TVyNovelas ===
Year	Category	Nominated work	Result
2008	Best Telenovela	Pura sangre	Won
2008	Best Actor	Rafael Novoa	Won
2008	Best Actress	Marcela Mar	Nominated
2008	Best Supporting Actress	Kathy Sáenz	Won
2008	Best Supporting Actor	Pepe Sánchez	Won
2008	Best Breakthrough Actor	Jason Bawth Chad	Nominated
2008	Best Breakthrough Actress	Renata González	Nominated
2008	Best Actor	Andrés Juan	Nominated
2008	Best Actress	María Fernanda Yépes	Nominated
2008	Best Theme Song	Pura sangre	Nominated
2008	Favorite Figure of 2007	Rafael Novoa	Won

== Mexican version ==
- Mañana es para siempre (2008–2009) - a Mexican telenovela produced by Televisa, starring Fernando Colunga, Silvia Navarro, Rogelio Guerra, Sergio Sendel and Lucero.
