= Rafael Novoa (actor) =

Colombian actor

- Born: Rafael Ernesto Novoa Vargas; October 31, 1971 (age 54); Bogotá, Colombia
- Occupation: Actor
- Years active: 1995-present

Rafael Ernesto Novoa Vargas (born October 30, 1971, Bogotá, Colombia) is a Colombian actor.

== Filmography ==
=== Television roles ===
Year	Title	Role	Notes
1995	Flor de oro	Antonio Erazo	
1996	Guajira	Felipe Uribe	
1997	Las Juanas	Rubén Calixto Salguero	
2000	Traga maluca	Pedro Conde	
2002	María Madrugada	Camilo Echeverry	
2003	Sofía dame tiempo	Santiago Rodríguez Salazar	
2003–04	Cosita rica	Diego Luján	
2004	Todos quieren con Marilyn	Rafael	
2005–06	Se solicita príncipe azul	Ricardo Izaguirre	
2007	Pura sangre	Eduardo Montenegro / Marco Vieira	
2009	Mañana es para siempre	Miguel Lazcuraín	2 episodes
2009	Las trampas del amor	Lorenzo Negret	
2010–11	A corazón abierto	Andrés Guerra	Main role
2012	El Talismán	Pedro Ibarra	Main role
2013	Alias el Mexicano	Coronel Jaime Ramírez Gómez	
2015–16	Sala de urgencias	Diego Romero	
2016	Bloque de búsqueda	Hernán Martín	
2017	El Señor de los Cielos	Raimundo Cabrera / El Duro	Recurring role; 63 episodes (season 5)
2021	La templanza	Mauro Larrea	Main role
2022–23	Cabo	Miguel Cantú	Recurring role; 41 episodes
2024	El ángel de Aurora	Julio César Rey	Main role
2025	Champeta, el ritmo de la Tierra	Eduardo Vallejos	
2026	Las de siempre	Patricio Vivas	
2026	Lobo, morir matando	Gustavo de la Colina	
2026	Corazón de oro	Armando	
