= No Molestar =

Studio album by Marco Antonio Solís
- Released: October 7, 2008
- Recorded: 2008
- Genre: Grupera
- Length: 46:07
- Label: Fonovisa
- Producer: Homero Patrón

Marco Antonio Solís chronology
Trozos de Mi Alma, Vol. 2 (2006)	No Molestar (2008)	En Total Plenitud (2010)

Singles from No Molestar
- 1. "No Molestar" Released: September 1, 2008; 2. "Nada Que Me Recuerde a Ti" Released: January 26, 2009; 3. "Si Me Puedo Quedar" Released: April 13, 2009; 4. "Sea Pues Por Dios" Released: July 27, 2009

No Molestar (Eng.: "Do Not Disturb") is the eighth studio album released by Marco Antonio Solís on October 7, 2008. This album became the ninth number-one set on the Billboard Top Latin Albums for Solís, the most for any artist on the chart.

== Track listing ==
All songs written and composed by Marco Antonio Solís

No.	Title	Length
1.	"No Molestar"	4:24
2.	"Orgullo de Metal"	4:17
3.	"Sea Pues por Dios"	3:32
4.	"Luna Llena"	3:39
5.	"Hasta Cuando"	3:49
6.	"Tú Otra Vez"	3:58
7.	"Nada Que Me Recuerde a Ti"	3:29
8.	"Quien Sabe Tú"	3:30
9.	"Si Me Puedo Quedar"	3:42
10.	"Te lo Puedo Asegurar"	3:33

Deluxe Edition
No.	Title	Writer(s)	Length
11.	"Gracias Virgencita"	Marco Antonio Solís	3:54
12.	"Si Me Vieras Ahora"	Marco Antonio Solís	4:16

Deluxe Edition DVD
No.	Title	Length
1.	"No Molestar"
2.	"No Molestar"
3.	"No Molestar" (Behind The Scenes and Interview)
4.	"Si Me Puedo Quedar"
5.	"Si Me Puedo Quedar" (Behind The Scenes)
6.	"No Puedo Olvidarla"
7.	"Antes de Que Te Vayas"
8.	"Bonus Material"

== Charts ==
Chart (2008)	Peak position
Mexican Albums (AMPROFON)	15
US Billboard 200	19
US Regional Mexican Albums (Billboard)	1
US Top Latin Albums (Billboard)	1

== Sales and certifications ==
Region	Certification	Certified units/sales
Argentina (CAPIF)	Platinum	40,000^{^}
Mexico (AMPROFON)	Gold	40,000^{^}
United States (RIAA)	2× Platinum (Latin)	200,000^{^}
^{^} Shipments figures based on certification alone.
