= Karen Martínez =

Colombian actress and model

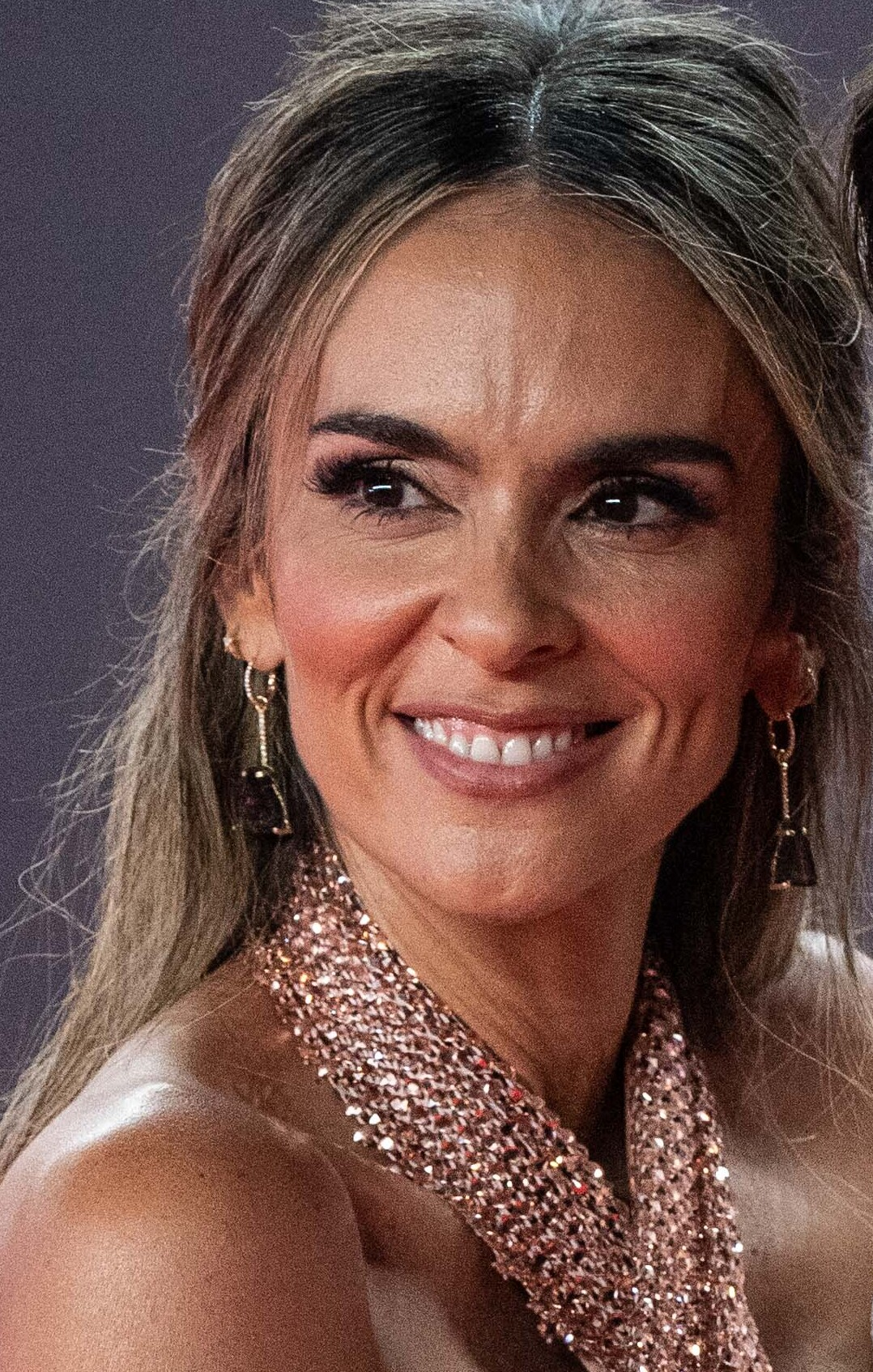
- Karen Martinez at the 2023 Latin Grammys
- Born: Karen Cecilia Martínez Insignares; August 14, 1979 (age 46); Cartagena, Colombia
- Occupations: Actress, model, and television presenter
- Years active: 2000–present
- Spouse: Juanes (m. 2004)
- Children: 3

Karen Cecilia Martínez Insignares (born August 14, 1979), better known as Karen Martínez, is a Colombian actress and model. She is married to the Colombian singer Juanes.

A model since age 14, Martinez first appeared on television in a commercial for a soda recorded by Carlos Vives in Cartagena.

== Biography ==
Karen Martínez was born in Cartagena, Colombia. She is married to Colombian singer Juanes. Martínez and Juanes now have two daughters (Paloma Aristizábal Martínez and Luna Aristizábal Martínez) and a son named Dante Aristizábal Martínez.

She has starred in the series "El Cartel de los Sapos" and other telenovelas.

== Telenovelas ==
- El cartel de los sapos (2008) as Sofia
- Tiempo final (2008) as Candela
- Sofía dame tiempo (2003) as Sofia
- Amor a Mil (2001) as Diana McKenzie
- Siniestro (2001) as Leah Santos
- Mujeres asesinas Lisa, La Soñadora
- Padres e hijos (2000) as Ximena
- Oki Doki (1992) as Marcelita

== Film ==
- Captain Avispa (2024) as Ximena Colmena
