= Jackeline Arroyo =

Mexican television actress, presenter and glamour model

Jacqueline Arroyo
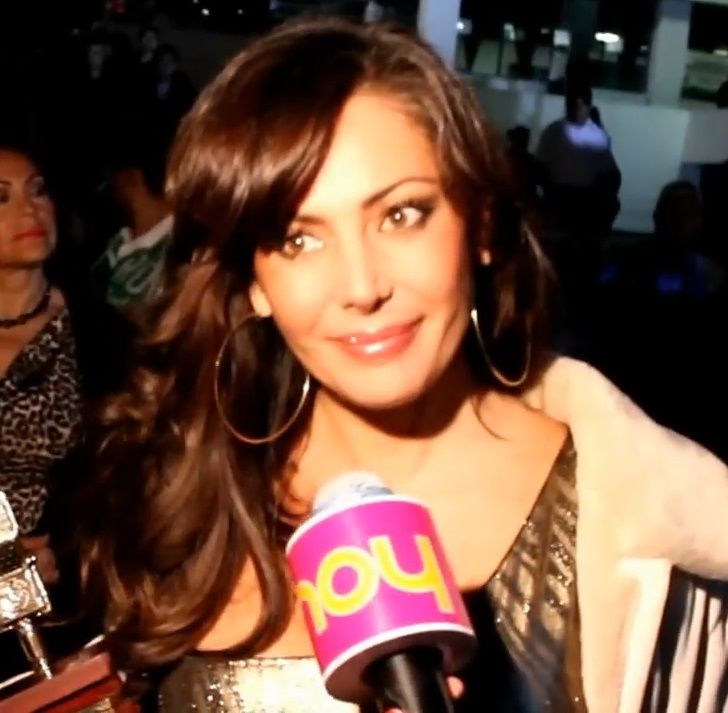
- Born: June 22, 1975 (age 50); Guadalajara, Jalisco, Mexico
- Occupations: Actress, model
- Years active: 1996–present

Jackeline Arroyo (born June 22, 1975, in Guadalajara, Jalisco, Mexico) is a Mexican television actress, presenter and glamour model. As an actress she is perhaps best known for her appearances in Mujer, casos de la vida real (2002–2003) and as Tomasa in the telenovela Mañana es para siempre (2008–09). She appeared in the March 2012 issue of Mexican Playboy magazine.

== Filmography ==
=== Television ===
- 1996 Banda Max – Hostess
- 1997 Salud, dinero y amor
- 1999 Todo se vale – Hostess
- 2000 Hasta en las mejores familias – Hostess
- 2001 Sin pecado concebido
- 2001–2002 Salomé – Irma
- 2002–2003 Vivan los niños – Thelma
- 2002–2003 Mujer, casos de la vida real
- 2004 La Jaula – Dominga
- 2005 Contra viento y marea – Odalys II / Odalys
- 2008–2009 Mañana es para siempre – Tomasa
- 2009–2023 La rosa de Guadalupe – Various roles
- 2010 La cantina del Tunco Maclovich
- 2011–2018 Como dice el dicho – Rebeca / Celia Martell / Perla / Irene / Patricia
