= Now That's What I Call Power Ballads =

Compilation album by Various artists
- Released: March 24, 2009
- Recorded: Various times
- Genre: Glam metal, hard rock, pop rock
- Length: 79:57
- Label: UMG

Series chronology
Now That's What I Call Music! 30 (2009)	Now That's What I Call Power Ballads (2009)	Now Esto Es Musica! Latino 4 (2009)

Professional ratings
Review scores
Source	Rating
AllMusic	2.5/5 stars

Now That's What I Call Power Ballads is a special edition compilation album from the (U.S.) Now series, containing power ballad rock songs mostly from the 1980s, and was released on March 24, 2009. It debuted at number thirty on the Billboard 200 albums chart in April 2009.

== Track listing ==
No.	Title	Artist	Length
1.	"Every Rose Has Its Thorn"	Poison	4:16
2.	"Faithfully"	Journey	4:23
3.	"I Don't Want to Miss a Thing"	Aerosmith	4:22
4.	"Love Bites"	Def Leppard	5:43
5.	"Is This Love"	Whitesnake	4:39
6.	"Never"	Heart	4:03
7.	"The Flame"	Cheap Trick	4:34
8.	"When I See You Smile"	Bad English	4:15
9.	"Sister Christian"	Night Ranger	4:14
10.	"The Search is Over"	Survivor	4:11
11.	"When I'm with You"	Sheriff	3:50
12.	"Still Loving You"	Scorpions	4:47
13.	"Fly to the Angels"	Slaughter	4:30
14.	"More Than Words"	Extreme	4:09
15.	"Amanda"	Boston	4:12
16.	"Love Song"	Tesla	4:02
17.	"Heaven"	Warrant	3:54
18.	"Silent Lucidity"	Queensrÿche	5:46

== Classic Power Ballads ==
On iTunes, the song, "Forever", by Kiss replaces the track, "Love Bites", by Def Leppard, and the album is titled Now That's What I Call Classic Power Ballads.

== Chart performance ==
Chart (2009)	Peak position
U.S. Billboard 200	30
U.S. Billboard Top Rock Albums	12
