= Más de Marco Antonio Solís =

Compilation album by Marco Antonio Solís
- Released: November 3, 2009
- Recorded: 1996–2006
- Genre: Pop Latino
- Length: 72:18
- Label: Fonovisa

Marco Antonio Solís chronology
| La Más Completa Colección (2009) | Más de Marco Antonio Solís (2009) | La Historia Continúa... Parte IV (2012) |

Más de Marco Antonio Solís (Eng.: "More of Marco Antonio Solis") is a compilation album released by Marco Antonio Solís on November 3, 2009. This album was released in two formats CD and CD with DVD.

== Track listing ==
All songs written and composed by Marco Antonio Solís

| No. | Title | Length |
|---|---|---|
| 1. | "Antes de Que Te Vayas" | 4:13 |
| 2. | "Recuerdos, Tristeza y Soledad" | 4:26 |
| 3. | "No Puedo Olvidarla" | 4:04 |
| 4. | "Prefiero Partir" | 3:31 |
| 5. | "Milagrito" | 3:33 |
| 6. | "O Me Voy o Te Vas" | 4:40 |
| 7. | "Tu Amor o Tu Desprecio" | 3:13 |
| 8. | "Sigue Sin Mi" | 3:57 |
| 9. | "Si No Te Hubieras Ido" | 4:44 |
| 10. | "Siempre Tu a Mi Lado" | 3:39 |
| 11. | "Mi Mayor Sacrificio" | 4:02 |
| 12. | "Me Vas a Hacer Llorar" | 3:22 |
| 13. | "Cuando Te Acuerdes de Mi" | 4:31 |
| 14. | "Ojala" | 3:43 |
| 15. | "El Peor de Mis Fracasos" | 4:09 |
| 16. | "Tu Hombre Perfecto" | 4:21 |
| 17. | "Mas Que Tu Amigo" | 3:28 |
| 18. | "Te Voy a Esperar" | 3:45 |

== DVD ==
| No. | Title | Length |
|---|---|---|
| 1. | "Antes de Que Te Vayas" |
| 2. | "O Me Voy o Te Vas" |
| 3. | "No Puedo Olvidarla" |
| 4. | "Mi Mayor Sacrificio" |
| 5. | "Más Que Tu Amigo" |

== Charts ==
=== Weekly charts ===
| Chart (2009) | Peak position |
|---|---|
| US Billboard 200 | 174 |
| US Top Latin Albums (Billboard) | 3 |
| US Regional Mexican Albums (Billboard) | 1 |

=== Year-end charts ===
| Chart (2010) | Position |
|---|---|
| US Top Latin Albums (Billboard) | 14 |
| Chart (2011) | Position |
| US Top Latin Albums (Billboard) | 49 |
