= Dos Grandes =

Compilation album by Marco Antonio Solís & Joan Sebastian
- Released: June 29, 2004
- Genre: Latin pop
- Label: Fonovisa

Marco Antonio Solís & Joan Sebastian chronology
La Historia Continúa... (2003)	Dos Grandes (2004)	La Historia Continúa... Parte II (2005)

Dos Grandes (Eng.: Two Great Ones) is a compilation album released by Marco Antonio Solís and Joan Sebastian on June 29, 2004. There is also an Enhanced Edition which is a CD with DVD. The album was certified gold in Mexico by AMPROFON.

== Track listing ==
No.	Title	Writer(s)	Length
1.	"Tu Amor o Tu Desprecio"	Marco Antonio Solís	3:17
2.	"Llorar (Live)"	Joan Sebastian	3:25
3.	"O Me Voy o Te Vas"	Marco Antonio Solís	4:47
4.	"Se Está Volviendo Loco"	Joan Sebastian	2:31
5.	"Tu Hombre Perfecto"	Marco Antonio Solís	4:23
6.	"Manantial de Llanto"	Joan Sebastian	3:30
7.	"Invéntame"	Marco Antonio Solís	3:31
8.	"Anoche Hablamos"	Joan Sebastian	3:29
9.	"Dónde Estará Mi Primavera"	Marco Antonio Solís	4:16
10.	"Gracias por Tanto Amor"	Joan Sebastian	3:32
11.	"Mi Eterno Amor Secreto"	Marco Antonio Solís	3:45
12.	"Afortunado"	Joan Sebastian	3:15

Enhanced Edition CD/DVD
No.	Title	Length
1.	"Si No Te Hubieras Ido"	4:48
2.	"Gracias por Tanto Amor"	3:32
3.	"Dónde Estará Mi Primavera"	4:16
4.	"Me Gustas"	3:27

== Chart performance ==
Professional ratings
Review scores
Source	Rating
Allmusic	3.5/5 stars

Chart (2004)	Peak position
U.S. Billboard Top Latin Albums	2
U.S. Billboard Regional Mexican Albums	1
U.S. Billboard 200	125

== Sales and certifications ==
Region	Certification	Certified units/sales
Mexico (AMPROFON)	Gold	50,000^{^}
^{^} Shipments figures based on certification alone.
