= Amigos de Gines =

The Amigos de Gines are a traditional Spanish singing group for the singing of sevillanas formed in Gines, Seville in 1969. The original members were the brothers Luis Baras and Carlos Baras, with Alfredo Santiago and Juan Antonio Hurtado. The group celebrated their 40th anniversary with the record 40 Años in 2010.
