= 15 Inolvidables Vol. 2 =

Compilation album by Marco Antonio Solís
- Released: August 7, 2015
- Recorded: 1996 – 2010
- Genre: Latin
- Label: Fonovisa

Marco Antonio Solís chronology
15 Inovidables (2015)	15 Inolvidables Vol. 2 (2015)	Por Amor a Morelia Michoacán (2015)

15 Inolvidables Vol. 2 is a compilation album released by Marco Antonio Solís on August 7, 2015. It reached the number 4 spot on the billboard Latin pop charts.

== Track listing ==
All songs written and composed by Marco Antonio Solís.

No.	Title	Length
1.	"A Dónde Vamos a Parar"	3:50
2.	"Se Va Muriendo Mi Alma"	4:35
3.	"Tu Hombre Perfecto"	4:24
4.	"Un Par de Humanos"	4:44
5.	"Muévete"	3:37
6.	"Mi Eterno Amor Secreto"	3:46
7.	"Que Pena Me Das"	4:11
8.	"Amor en Silencio"	3:58
9.	"Antes de Que Te Vayas"	4:16
10.	"Más Que Tu Amigo"	3:33
11.	"Que Te Quieran Más Que Yo"	4:23
12.	"La Ultima Parte"	4:39
13.	"Tú Me Vuelves Loco"	3:23
14.	"No Puedo Olvidarla"	4:06
15.	"La Venia Bendita"	3:15

== Charts ==
Chart (2015)	Peak position
US Top Latin Albums (Billboard)	15
US Latin Pop Albums (Billboard)	4
