= La Historia (Kumbia Kings album) =

Greatest hits album by A.B. Quintanilla y Los Kumbia Kings
- Released: October 21, 2003
- Recorded: 1998–2003
- Genre: Cumbia, Latin pop
- Length: 54:49
- Label: EMI Latin
- Producer: A.B. Quintanilla III; Cruz Martínez

A.B. Quintanilla y Los Kumbia Kings chronology
Presents Kumbia Kings (2003)	La Historia (2003)	Los Remixes 2.0 (2004)

Professional ratings
Review scores
Source	Rating
Allmusic	4/5 stars

La Historia (English: The History) is the second compilation album and sixth album by Mexican-American cumbia group A.B. Quintanilla y Los Kumbia Kings and the second compilation album by Mexican-American musician A.B. Quintanilla. It was released on October 21, 2003, by EMI Latin. This album became their third number one album on the US Billboard Top Latin Albums chart.

== Track listing ==
This track listing from Billboard.com

No.	Title	Writer(s)	Length
1.	"Intro" (featuring Cristina Saralegui)		1:02
2.	"Fuiste Mala" (featuring Ricky Muñoz of Intocable)	A.B. Quintanilla III, Cruz Martínez, Ricky Vela	3:20
3.	"Desde Que No Estás Aquí"	Quintanilla III, Luigi Giraldo	3:41
4.	"Azúcar" (featuring Fito Olivares)	Quintanilla III, Giraldo, Edward Palmieri	3:30
5.	"Shhh! (Borrashhho Mix)"	Quintanilla III, Martínez, Giraldo	4:23
6.	"Dime Por Qué"	Quintanilla III, Ricky Vela	3:51
7.	"Te Quiero a Ti"	Quintanilla III, Vela	3:16
8.	"Boom Boom"	Quintanilla III, Martínez, Giraldo	4:16
9.	"Dime Quién"	Quintanilla III, Vela	3:24
10.	"Me Enamoré"	Quintanilla III, Martínez, Giraldo	3:23
11.	"La Cucaracha"	Quintanilla III, Martínez, Jason Cano, Nick "DJ Franz" Washington	3:27
12.	"Se Fue Mi Amor"	Quintanilla III, Giraldo, Pete Astudillo	3:06
13.	"U Don't Love Me (Booty Mix)"	Sean Dunson, Johnnie Mae Dunson	4:35
14.	"Me Estoy Muriendo"	Quintanilla III, Vela, Giraldo	3:57
15.	"Reggae Kumbia (Kranium Mix)"	Quintanilla III, Vico C	4:14
16.	"Outro"		1:24

== Chart performance ==
Chart (2003)	Peak position
US Billboard 200	109
US Billboard Top Latin Albums	1
US Billboard Latin Pop Albums	1

== Sales and certifications ==
Region	Certification	Certified units/sales
United States (RIAA)	2× Platinum (Latin)	200,000^{^}
^{^} Shipments figures based on certification alone.
