= Now Esto Es Musica! Latino 3 =

Now Esto Es Musica! Latino Volume 3

Compilation album by Various artists
- Released: October 2, 2007
- Genre: Latin pop, Reggaeton, Salsa, Bachata
- Label: EMI Latin

Full series chronology
Now That's What I Call Music! 25 (2007)	Now Esto Es Musica! Latino Volume 3 (2007)	Now That's What I Call Music! 26 (2007)

Latino series chronology
Now Esto Es Musica! Latino 2 (2006)	Now Esto Es Musica! Latino 3 (2007)	Now Esto Es Musica! Latino 4 (2009)

Professional ratings
Review scores
Source	Rating
Allmusic	link

Now Esto Es Musica! Latino 3 was released on October 2, 2007. Unlike the previous two NOW Latino albums, this volume features eighteen tracks rather than twenty and adds songs from the salsa and bachata musical genres.

== Track listing ==
1. Ricky Martin – "Pégate"
2. Daddy Yankee feat. Fergie – "Impacto (Remix)"
3. RKM & Ken-Y – "Llorarás"
4. Belinda – "Bella Traición"
5. La 5ª Estación – "Ahora Que Te Vas"
6. Jennifer Lopez – "Qué Hiciste"
7. Hector "El Father" – "Sola"
8. Kumbia All Starz – "Chiquilla"
9. Nelly Furtado feat. Residente Calle 13 – "No Hay Igual (Remix)"
10. Aventura – "Mi Corazoncito"
11. RBD – "Tu Amor"
12. Tito "El Bambino" feat. Randy – "Siente el Boom"
13. Calle 13 feat. Bajofondo Tango Club & Panasuyo – "Tango del Pecado"
14. Luis Fonsi – "Tu Amor"
15. Juan Luis Guerra – "La Llave de Mi Corazón"
16. David Bisbal feat. Vicente Amigo & Wisin & Yandel – "Torre de Babel (Reggaeton Mix)"
17. Paulina Rubio – "Ayúdame"
18. Marc Anthony – "Que Precio Tiene el Cielo"

== Charts ==
=== Weekly charts ===
Chart (2007)	Peak position
US Billboard 200	89
US Top Latin Albums (Billboard)	2
US Latin Pop Albums (Billboard)	1

=== Year-end charts ===
Chart (2008)	Position
US Top Latin Albums (Billboard)	52
