= 15 Inolvidables =

Compilation album by Marco Antonio Solís
- Released: February 10, 2015
- Recorded: 1993 – 2008
- Genre: Latin
- Label: Fonovisa
- Producer: Marco Antonio Solís

Marco Antonio Solís chronology
Antología (2014)	15 Inolvidables (2015)	15 Inolvidables Vol. 2 (2015)

15 Inolvidables is a compilation album released by Marco Antonio Solís on February 10, 2015. Accepto Mi Derrota was recorded with Los Bukis.

"Inolvidable" is Spanish for "unforgettable".

== Track listing ==
All songs were written and composed by Marco Antonio Solís

No.	Title	Length
1.	"Acepto Mi Derrota"	4:14
2.	"Asi Como Te Conoci"	4:24
3.	"Para Que Seas Feliz"	4:55
4.	"Donde Estara Mi Primavera"	4:17
5.	"Tu Amor o Tu Desprecio"	3:15
6.	"Sigue Sin Mi"	4:03
7.	"Si Te Pudiera Mentir"	4:24
8.	"El Peor de Mis Fracasos"	4:16
9.	"A Que Me Quedo Contigo"	4:23
10.	"Si No Te Hubieras Ido"	4:50
11.	"O Me Voy o Te Vas"	4:53
12.	"Recuerdos, Tristeza y Soledad"	4:30
13.	"Sin Lado Izquierdo"	4:24
14.	"Mi Mayor Sacrificio"	4:07
15.	"Si Me Puedo Quedar"	3:41

== Charts ==
=== Weekly charts ===
Chart (2014–2016)	Peak position
US Top Latin Albums (Billboard)	7
US Latin Pop Albums (Billboard)	4
US Regional Mexican Albums (Billboard)	19

=== Year-end charts ===
Chart (2015)	Position
US Top Latin Albums (Billboard)	9
Chart (2016)	Position
US Top Latin Albums (Billboard)	31
