= Salomé (TV series) =

- Genre: Telenovela; Romance; Drama
- Created by: Arturo Moya Grau
- Written by: Marcia del Río; Calú Gutiérrez; Ricardo Tejeda; Martha Jurado
- Directed by: Sergio Giménez; Sergio Cataño; Patricia Reyes Spíndola
- Starring: Edith González; Guy Ecker; Sebastián Ligarde; Mónika Sánchez
- Theme music composer: Adolfo Ángel Alba; Juan Gabriel; Marco Antonio Solís "El Buki"
- Opening theme: "Si tú quisieras" by Los Temerarios "Si no te hubieras ido" by Marco Antonio Solís "El Buki"
- Ending theme: "Si tú quisieras (Salsa version)" by Los Temerarios "Huellas" by Niurka Marcos
- Country of origin: Mexico
- Original language: Spanish
- No. of episodes: 150

Production
- Executive producer: Juan Osorio
- Producer: Ramón Ortiz Quiñónes
- Production locations: Filming; Televisa San Ángel; Mexico City, Mexico; Locations; Mexico City, Mexico
- Cinematography: Gilberto Macín; Enrique García; Antonio Acevedo
- Camera setup: Multi-camera
- Running time: 41-44 minutes
- Production company: Televisa

Original release
- Network: Canal de las Estrellas
- Release: October 22, 2001 – May 17, 2002

Related
- La Colorina (1977); Colorina (1980-1981); Apasionada (1993); Salomé (1991)

Salomé is a Mexican telenovela produced by Juan Osorio for Televisa in 2001. It is the third remake of La Colorina.

On Monday, October 22, 2001, Canal de las Estrellas started broadcasting Salomé weekdays at 8:00pm, replacing La intrusa. The last episode was broadcast on Friday, May 17, 2002, with La otra replacing it the following Monday.

The series stars Edith González, Guy Ecker, Sebastián Ligarde and Mónika Sánchez.

== Plot ==
In 1980, Mexico City is home to millions who hope for a better future, while others weep for the comfort they have lost.

In the D'Ruby cabaret lives Salomé, she is the main dancer of the show; her beauty and sensuality captivate the audience. Salomé and Karicia are two supportive friends through thick and thin. Together with Yolanda, the owner of the place, who in her time was known as the "Queen of the Night", they are the soul and motor of the cabaret.

The dressing room is Salomé's refuge. Surrounded by lights, feathers and sequins, it would seem that her life is a constant party, but it is not. She found in dance a way to understand life, to challenge the past. She maintains an internal fight that does not end; since she was a child, she got to know pain due to the abandonment of her parents. She was tricked in love and has survived in a hostile world. "El Figurín" is the heartthrob of the neighborhood. He is violent, macho and in love with Salomé, but she breaks up the relationship because she dreams of true love.

Near the cabaret there is a neighborhood where a series of characters live: There we get to know Kikis, a gossipy but cooperative woman; Hipólito, who is a plumber, but laziness and the inability to think about the future have made him mediocre; Marta, his wife, wants a better life, has aspirations and feels that her marriage is dying. Piro, Marta's brother, lives with them. He is very similar to Hipólito, they spend their time joking and playing, as if they didn't take life seriously. Lola sells fayuca and, together with "El Figurín", she controls a gang. She falls in love with David, who has a secret and will be Lola's downfall.

On the other side of the city, in a mansion, lives the Montesino family: Julio and Ángela are married. She is a sick woman and her husband faces the problem and patiently bears the eventful marital life he is forced to live. Lucrecia, Julio's mother, thinks that Ángela, being sterile, represents an obstacle for the family. Accustomed to dominate and to modify wills, she will twist Julio's destiny until she achieves her longed-for grandson.

Arturo, Lucrecia's husband, has assumed his life as a faithful and good husband. He accepts Lucrecia's feminine strength because he loves her and prefers to live in peace. He is an understanding father and wants to keep the family together. Manola is a strong woman, she faces Lucrecia, she does not allow Ángela to be hurt. She is the guardian angel of the Montesino family. She has dedicated her life to the service of the family, she represents balance and good sense.

Diego, Ángela's half brother, lives with them. He is a playboy, partygoer and regular client of the D'Ruby cabaret. On a drunken night, Diego arrives at the mansion accompanied by Salomé and Karicia.

Salomé meets Julio and the two develop a romantic relationship. They begin a secret relationship despite circumstances that make their romance difficult. Salomé subsequently faces a series of personal and emotional challenges as she attempts to maintain the relationship. She considers Julio an important figure in her life, although their relationship begins after she has already established other commitments.

== Cast ==
Book 1

Lead cast

- Edith Gonzalez as Fernanda Quiñónes / "Salomé"
- Guy Ecker as Julio Montesino
- Sebastián Ligarde as Diego Duval
- Mónika Sánchez as Ángela Duval de Montesino

Supporting cast

- María Rubio as Lucrecia de Montesino
- Patricia Reyes Spíndola as Manola
- Aarón Hernán as Arturo Montesino
- Raúl Ramírez as Dr. Íñigo
- Yolanda Montes "Tongolele" as Yolanda
- Leticia Perdigón as Lola
- Jaime Garza as Hipólito
- Paty Díaz as Marta
- Julián Bravo as Guillermo
- Katie Barberi as Laura de Cansino
- Juan Imperio as Animador
- Roberto Palazuelos as Humberto "Beto" Treviño / "El Figurín"
- Rodrigo Vidal as Danny / Soraya
- Carlos Eduardo Rico as Piro
- Rosita Pelayo as Kikis
- Andrés García Jr. as Víctor
- Fernando Robles as Pancho
- Iliana de la Garza as Leonor
- Thelma Tixou as Teporocha
- José Roberto Cantoral as Lucho
- Milton Cortés as David / "El Matador"
- Raúl Castellanos as Juanito
- Romina Dos Pasos as Lupita
- Carlos González as Cairo
- Luis Romo as Manotas
- Damián Sarka as Diente de Oro
- Leo Navarro as Caritas
- Arturo Guízar as Abel
- Julián Pastor as Lawyer Arango
- Niurka Marcos as Karicia de Cisneros / "Platonia"

Book 2

Lead cast

- Edith Gonzalez as Fernanda Quiñónes de Lavalle / "Salomé"
- Guy Ecker as Julio Montesino
- Rafael Amaya as José Julián Lavalle Quiñónes
- Ernesto D'Alessio as José Miguel Lavalle Quiñónes
- José María Torre as José Armando Lavalle Quiñónes

Supporting cast

- Sebastián Ligarde as Diego Duval
- María Rubio as Lucrecia de Montesino
- Aarón Hernán as Arturo Montesino
- Patricia Reyes Spíndola as Manola
- Raúl Ramírez as Dr. Íñigo
- Julián Bravo as Guillermo
- Roberto Vander as Mauricio Valdivia
- Jaime Garza as Hipólito
- Alejandra Procuna as Rebeca Santos
- Rosita Pelayo as Kikis
- Carlos Eduardo Rico as Piro
- Alessandra Rosaldo as Karla Cansino
- Zully Keith as Rosario
- Arturo Guízar as Abel
- Marco Uriel as Roberto
- Jacqueline Arroyo as Irma
- Antonio Brenan as Chava
- Jorge Brenan as Nacho
- Pablo Cheng as Willy
- Christian Ruiz as Aldo
- Yuliana Peniche as Money
- Kelchie Arizmendi as Natalia
- Thaily Amezcua as Romina
- Damián Mendiola as Mauro
- Alberto Salaberry as Juan "Juanito" Pérez
- Carmen Becerra as Diana
- Iliana de la Garza as Leonor
- Milton Cortés as David / "El Matador"
- Niurka Marcos as Karicia de Cisneros / "Platonia"

== Awards and nominations ==
Year	Award	Category	Nominee	Result
2002	20th TVyNovelas Awards	Best Telenovela	Juan Osorio	Nominated
2002	20th TVyNovelas Awards	Best Actress	Edith González	Nominated
2002	20th TVyNovelas Awards	Best Actor	Guy Ecker	Nominated
2002	20th TVyNovelas Awards	Best Co-lead Actress	Patricia Reyes Spíndola	Nominated
2002	20th TVyNovelas Awards	Best Co-lead Actor	Aarón Hernán	Nominated
2002	20th TVyNovelas Awards	Best Supporting Actress	Niurka Marcos	Won
2002	20th TVyNovelas Awards	Best Supporting Actor	Rodrigo Vidal	Won
2002	20th TVyNovelas Awards	Best Male Revelation	Rafael Amaya	Nominated
2002	El Heraldo de México Awards	Best Telenovela	Juan Osorio	Nominated
2002	El Heraldo de México Awards	Best Actress	Edith González	Nominated
2002	El Heraldo de México Awards	Best Direction	Sergio Giménez	Nominated
2003	INTE Awards	Actress of the Year	Edith González	Nominated
2003	INTE Awards	Telenovela Musical Theme of the Year	"Si no te hubieras ido" by Marco Antonio Solís	Nominated

== DVD releases ==
=== Region 2 ===
Pandastorm Pictures released the series in Germany on May 8, 2015. The first volume, a 10-DVD box set containing episodes 1–50, is code-free and includes audio in German DD 2.0, Spanish DD 2.0.
