= Nada Que Me Recuerde a Ti =

Single by Marco Antonio Solís

from the album No Molestar
- Released: January 26, 2009
- Genre: Latin pop · Cumbia · Regional Mexican
- Length: 3:27
- Label: Fonovisa
- Songwriter: Marco Antonio Solís

Marco Antonio Solís singles chronology
"No Molestar" (2008)	"Nada Que Me Recuerde a Ti" (2009)	"Si Me Puedo Quedar" (2009)

"Nada Que Me Recuerde a Ti" ("Nothing That Reminds Me of You") is a song written and recorded by Marco Antonio Solís. Released in January 26 of 2009, this is his second single from his 8th studio album No Molestar.

== Track listing ==
No.	Title	Length
1.	"Nada Que Me Recuerde a Ti"	3:27
2.	"Nada Que Me Recuerde a Ti (Bonus Track Version)"	3:27

== Charts ==
Chart (2009)	Peak position
U.S. Billboard Top Latin Songs	29
U.S. Billboard Regional Mexican Songs	24
U.S. Billboard Latin Pop Songs	40
