= 40 Años (album) =

Compilation album by Marco Antonio Solís
- Released: September 2, 2016
- Recorded: 1981 – 2013
- Genre: Latin
- Label: Fonovisa
- Producer: Marco Antonio Solís

Marco Antonio Solís chronology
Por Amor a Morelia Michoacán (2015)	40 Años (2016)	Con Amor y Sentimiento (2020)

40 Años is a compilation album released by Marco Antonio Solís on September 2, 2016. This album celebrates 40 years of his historic musical career as an artist. It also includes songs from his time with Los Bukis.

== Disc 1 ==
All songs written and composed by Marco Antonio Solís except for El Perdedor

No.	Title	Length
1.	"El Perdedor" (featuring Enrique Iglesias)	3:15
2.	"Que Pena Me Das"	4:11
3.	"Se Va Muirendo Mi Alma"	4:35
4.	"Sigue Sin Mi"	4:01
5.	"Si Te Puidera Mentir"	4:25
6.	"El Peor de Mis Fracasos"	4:15
7.	"A Que Me Quedo Contigo"	3:20
8.	"Si No Te Huberias Ido"	4:50
9.	"O Me Voy o Te Vas"	4:50
10.	"Recuerdos, Tristeza y Soledad"	4:31
11.	"Sin Lado Izquierdo"	4:21
12.	"Mi Mayor Sacrificio"	4:05
13.	"Si Me Puedo Quedar"	3:43
14.	"Mas Que Tu Amigo"	3:33
15.	"Tu Hombre Perfecto"	4:24
16.	"La Venia Bendita"	3:14
17.	"¿A Donde Vamos a Parar?"	3:49
18.	"Tres Semanas"	3:41

== Disc 2 ==
All songs written and composed by Marco Antonio Solís

No.	Title	Length
1.	"Tu Carcel"	3:36
2.	"Como Fui a Enamorarme de Ti"	4:34
3.	"A Donde Vas"	4:06
4.	"Acepto Mi Derrota"	4:12
5.	"Mi Mayor Necesidad"	4:10
6.	"Necesito Una Compañera"	4:00
7.	"Me Volvi a Acordar de Ti"	3:31
8.	"A Donde Vayas"	3:32
9.	"Mi Fantasia"	3:32
10.	"Presiento Que Voy a Llorar"	3:31
11.	"Viva el Amor"	3:59
12.	"Si Me Recuerdas"	4:38
13.	"Como Me Haces Falta"	4:01
14.	"Ya No Te Vayas"	4:13
15.	"El Celoso"	3:28
16.	"Yo Te Necesito"	3:02
17.	"Quiéreme"	4:12
18.	"Te Esperare"	3:43
19.	"Morenita"	2:47
20.	"Y Ahora Te Vas"	3:59

== Charts ==
=== Weekly charts ===
Chart (2016)	Peak position
US Top Latin Albums (Billboard)	2
US Latin Pop Albums (Billboard)	3

=== Year-end charts ===
Chart (2016)	Position
US Top Latin Albums (Billboard)	36
Chart (2017)	Position
US Top Latin Albums (Billboard)	21
Chart (2018)	Position
US Top Latin Albums (Billboard)	30
Chart (2021)	Position
US Top Latin Albums (Billboard)	94
