= 30 Inolvidables =

30 Inolvidables is a 2003 compilation album series:

- 30 Inolvidables (Los Bukis album)
- 30 Inolvidables, by Grupo Bronco
- 30 Inolvidables, by Los Cadetes de Linares
- 30 Inolvidables, by José María Napoleón
- 30 Inolvidables, by Rigo Tovar
- 30 Inolvidables, by Los Freddy's
