= 20 Inolvidables =

20 Inolvidables is a 2003 Latin compilation album series including:

- 20 Inolvidables (Los Bukis and Los Temerarios album)
- 20 Inolvidables, by José José
- 20 Inolvidables, by José Alfredo Jiménez
- 20 Inolvidables, by Los Yonic's
- 20 Inolvidables, by Los Acosta
