= Trozos de Mi Alma, Vol. 2 =

Studio album by Marco Antonio Solís
- Released: September 26, 2006
- Recorded: 2006
- Studio: EMI Abbey Road Studio 2 (London); Conway Recording Studios (Hollywood, California)
- Genre: Latin pop; latin ballad
- Length: 41:24
- Label: Fonovisa
- Producer: Marco Antonio Solís; Pablo Aguirre; Marco Valentino Talavera

Marco Antonio Solís chronology
Razón de Sobra (2004)	Trozos de Mi Alma, Vol. 2 (2006)	No Molestar (2008)

Singles from Trozos de Mi Alma, Vol. 2
- 1. "Antes de Que Te Vayas (2006)"; 2. "Ojalá (2007)"; 3. "No Puedo Olvidarla (2007)"; 4. "Te Voy a Esperar (2007)"

Trozos de Mi Alma, Vol. 2 (English: Pieces of My Soul, Vol. 2) is the seventh studio album recorded by Mexican singer-songwriter Marco Antonio Solís. It was released by Fonovisa Records on September 26, 2006 (see 2006 in music). It became his sixth number-one set on the Billboard Top Latin Albums. Like his 1999 release Trozos de Mi Alma, this album includes songs written by Solís that were previously recorded by other artists, such as Laura Flores ("Antes de Que Te Vayas" and Te Voy a Esperar"), his brother José Javier Solís ("Quien Se Enamoró"), Pablo Montero ("Pídemelo Todo"), Victoria ("Hay Veces"), Rocío Dúrcal ("Extráñandote" and "Yo Creía Que Sí"), Paulina Rubio ("Ojalá") and Marisela ("Dios Bendiga Nuestro Amor" and "No Puedo Olvidarlo"). The album was released in a standard CD presentation and in a CD/DVD combo, including the music video for the first single "Antes de Que Te Vayas", the track "Sin Lado Izquierdo" (first included on his album Razón de Sobra) and bonus materials. It received a nomination for a Grammy Award for Best Latin Pop Album. “Antes de Que Te Vayas" served as the opening theme for the Mexican telenovela Mundo de Fieras (2006–2007), produced by Salvador Mejía Alejandre starring César Évora, Gaby Espino, and Edith González.

== Track listing ==
All songs written and composed by Marco Antonio Solís

No.	Title	Length
1.	"Antes de Que Te Vayas"	4:14
2.	"Quien Se Enamoró"	3:25
3.	"Te Voy a Esperar"	3:44
4.	"Hay Veces"	4:48
5.	"Pídemelo Todo"	3:40
6.	"Extrañándote"	4:09
7.	"Dios Bendiga Nuestro Amor"	3:54
8.	"Ojalá"	3:45
9.	"Yo Creía Que Sí"	4:56
10.	"No Puedo Olvidarla"	4:04

== DVD ==
No.	Title	Length
1.	"Antes de Que Te Vayas"
2.	"Sin Lado Izquierdo"
3.	"Behind The Scenes"
4.	"Photo Gallery"

== Charts ==
=== Weekly charts ===
Chart (2006)	Peak position
US Billboard 200	52
US Top Latin Albums (Billboard)	1
US Latin Pop Albums (Billboard)	1

=== Year-end charts ===
Chart (2006)	Position
US Top Latin Albums (Billboard)	33

== Sales and certifications ==
Region	Certification	Certified units/sales
Mexico (AMPROFON)	Platinum	100,000^{^}
United States (RIAA)	2× Platinum (Latin)	200,000^{^}
^{^} Shipments figures based on certification alone.
