= No Molestar (song) =

Single by Marco Antonio Solís

from the album No Molestar
- Released: September 1, 2008
- Genre: Grupera
- Length: 4:22
- Label: Fonovisa
- Songwriter: Marco Antonio Solís

Marco Antonio Solís singles chronology
"Te Voy A Esperar" (2008)	"No Molestar" (2008)	"Nada Que Me Recuerde a Tí" (2009)

"No Molestar" ("Do Not Disturb") is a song written and recorded by Marco Antonio Solís. Released in September 1 of 2008 for his 7th studio album No Molestar, the song performed very well in the United States entering the Billboard's on week of September 27, 2008. The song received a Latin Grammy Award for "Best Regional Mexican Song".

== Track listing ==
No.	Title	Length
1.	"No Molestar"	4:22
2.	"No Molestar (Bonus Track Version)"	4:24

== Charts ==
Chart (2008)	Peak position
U.S. Billboard Top Latin Songs	3
U.S. Billboard Regional Mexican Songs	7
U.S. Billboard Latin Pop Songs	8
