= Más de Mi Alma =

Studio album by Marco Antonio Solís
- Released: May 29, 2001
- Recorded: 2000–2001
- Studio: Air Studios Lyndhurts Hall (Hampstead, London); Larrabee Sound Studios (Los Angeles, California); Fullersound (Miami, Florida)
- Genre: Latin pop; Latin ballad
- Length: 41:07
- Label: Fonovisa
- Producer: Bebu Silvetti

Marco Antonio Solís chronology
Trozos de Mi Alma (1999)	Más de Mi Alma (2001)	Tu Amor o Tu Desprecio (2003)

Singles from Más de Mi Alma
- 1. "O Me Voy o Te Vas (2001)"; 2. "Cuando Te Acuerdes de Mí (2001)"; 3. "Sé Que Me Va a Dejar (2002)"; 4. "Dónde Estará Mi Primavera (2002)"

Professional ratings
Review scores
Source	Rating
Allmusic	3/5 stars

Más de Mi Alma (English: More of My Soul) is the fourth studio album recorded by Mexican singer-songwriter Marco Antonio Solís. It was released by Fonovisa Records on May 29, 2001 (see 2001 in music). This album became his second number-one hit on the Billboard Top Latin Albums chart and received a nomination for Latin Grammy Award for Best Pop Vocal Album, Male at the 3rd Annual Latin Grammy Awards in 2002. "Cuando Te Acuerdes de Mi" was featured in the telenovela Salomé (2001–2002), produced by Juan Osorio. The album received a 2002 Premio Lo Nuestro Award nomination for Pop Album of the Year.

== Track listing ==
All songs written and composed by Marco Antonio Solís

No.	Title	Writer(s)	Length
1.	"Cuándo Te Acuerdes de Mí"	Marco Antonio Solís	4:41
2.	"O Me Voy o Te Vas"	Marco Antonio Solís	4:49
3.	"En Desventaja"	Marco Antonio Solís	3:21
4.	"Resignación"	Marco Antonio Solís	3:47
5.	"Boca de Ángel"	Marco Antonio Solís	4:02
6.	"Tú Hombre Perfecto"	Marco Antonio Solís	4:22
7.	"Fue Mejor Así"	Marco Antonio Solís	3:58
8.	"Se Qué Me Va a Dejar"	Marco Antonio Solís	4:18
9.	"Mujeres Solitas"	Marco Antonio Solís	2:23
10.	"Dónde Estará Mi Primavera"	Marco Antonio Solís	4:16

== Credits ==
Credits adapted from Allmusic.

- Bebu Silvetti: Synthesizer, piano, producer, music direction
- Sylvia Silvetti: Coordination
- Benny Faccone: Engineer
- Alfredo Matheus: Engineer, mixing
- Steve Orchard: Engineer
- Tony Rambo: Engineer
- Boris Milan: Editing
- Richard Bravo: percussion
- Julio Hernández: Banjo
- Orlando Hernández: drums
- Manny López: Guitar, mandolin
- Johnathan Rees: Concertina
- Bárbara Larrinaga: vocals
- John Coulter: Graphic design
- Dorothy Low: Photography

== Chart performance ==
Chart (2001)	Peak position
US Billboard Top Latin Albums	1
US Billboard Latin Pop Albums	1
US Billboard Top Independent Albums	3
US Billboard Top Heatseekers	1
US Billboard 200	104

== Sales and certifications ==
Region	Certification	Certified units/sales
Argentina (CAPIF)	Gold	20,000^{^}
Mexico (AMPROFON)	2× Platinum	300,000^{^}
United States (RIAA)	Gold	500,000^{^}
^{^} Shipments figures based on certification alone.

== See also ==
- List of best-selling Latin albums
