= Razón de Sobra =

Studio album by Marco Antonio Solís
- Released: November 2, 2004
- Recorded: 2004
- Studio: Conway Recording Studios (Hollywood, California.); EMI-Capitol Recording Studios (London, England)
- Genre: Latin pop; latin ballad
- Length: 42:16
- Label: Fonovisa
- Producer: Marco Antonio Solís

Marco Antonio Solís chronology
Tu Amor o Tu Desprecio (2003)	Razón de Sobra (2004)	Trozos de Mi Alma, Vol. 2 (2006)

Singles from Razón de Sobra
- 1. "Mi Mayor Sacrificio" Released: September 27, 2004; 2. "Siempre Tú a Mi Lado" Released: February 28, 2005; 3. "Sin Lado Izquierdo" Released: May 23, 2005; 4. "En el Mismo Tren" Released: September 5, 2005; 5. "Razón de Sobra" Released: December 12, 2005

Razón de Sobra (English: With a Lot of Reason) is the sixth studio album recorded by Mexican singer-songwriter Marco Antonio Solís. It was released by Fonovisa Records on November 2, 2004 (see 2004 in music). This album became his fifth number-one set on the Billboard Top Latin Albums. It was released in a standard CD presentation and in a CD/DVD combo, including the music video for the lead single "Mi Mayor Sacrificio" and bonus materials. The album earned a Latin Grammy Award nomination for Best Male Pop Vocal Album. The album sold 75,000 copies in its first day of release.

== Track listing ==
All songs written and composed by Marco Antonio Solís

No.	Title	Length
1.	"Mi Mayor Sacrificio"	4:04
2.	"Siempre Tú a Mi Lado"	3:41
3.	"Razón de Sobra"	4:10
4.	"Nuestra Confesión"	3:35
5.	"En el Mismo Tren"	4:10
6.	"Sin Lado Izquierdo"	4:20
7.	"Siempre Me Toca Perder"	3:54
8.	"De Haber Sabido"	5:31
9.	"Sin Pensarlo"	4:37
10.	"Sé Que Te Irá Mejor"	4:10

== DVD ==
No.	Title	Length
1.	"Interview"
2.	"Mi Mayor Sacrificio"
3.	"Behind The Scenes"
4.	"Photo Gallery"
5.	"Discography"

== Chart performance ==
Chart (2004)	Peak position
US Billboard Top Latin Albums	1
US Billboard Latin Pop Albums	1
US Billboard 200	58

== Sales and certifications ==
Region	Certification	Certified units/sales
Argentina (CAPIF)	Platinum	40,000^{^}
Chile	—	33,000
Mexico (AMPROFON)	Platinum	100,000^{^}
United States (RIAA)	2× Platinum (Latin)	200,000^{^}
^{^} Shipments figures based on certification alone.
