= Pirekua =

Mexican song form

- Cultural origins: Purépecha
- Derivative forms: Sones; abajeños

Pirekua, traditional song of the P’urhépecha
- UNESCO Intangible Cultural Heritage
- Country: Mexico
- Reference: 00398
- Region: Latin America and the Caribbean

Inscription history
- Inscription: 2010 (5th session)
- List: Representative

Pirekua (Purépecha) is a song form of the Purépecha (Michoacán, Mexico). The singer of a pirekua, a pirériecha, may be male or female, solo or accompanied, and pirekua may be performed instrumentally. Pirériechas act as social mediators and "express sentiments and communicate events of importance to the Purépecha communities."

Pirekua ensembles usually include "two or three guitars, strings and winds, [and] a small brass band, or [pirériecha are] unaccompanied." Performed with "a gentle rhythm", generally in sones (3/8 time) or abajeños (6/8 time), the genre combines African, European, and indigenous American influences. Pirekua is related to the son and the waltz, and Henrietta Yurchenco points out that both the son and pirekua are in a slow triple meter, performed as duets, feature rhythmic sequence against fixed patterns in the accompaniment, and use two to three chords (I-IV-V) in major or minor with little modulation.

The subjects of pirekua lyrics range "from historical events to religion, social and political thought and love and courtship, making extensive use of symbolism." Lyrics make frequent use of flowers as symbols of femininity, passion, and local identity. While sones are usually sung in Spanish, pirekua are usually sung in Purépecha, and while sones tends toward everyday life, pirekua tend more towards poetic expressions of the Purépecha world view.

== See also ==
- UNESCO Intangible Cultural Heritage Lists
