= Tu Amor o Tu Desprecio =

Studio album by Marco Antonio Solís
- Released: May 13, 2003
- Recorded: 2002–2003
- Studio: Track Record Studio (North Hollywood, California); WaterSound Studio (Studio City, California)
- Genre: Latin pop; Mariachi; Cumbia
- Length: 35:04
- Label: Fonovisa
- Producer: Homero Patrón

Marco Antonio Solís chronology
Más de Mi Alma (2001)	Tu Amor o Tu Desprecio (2003)	Razón de Sobra (2004)

Singles from Tu Amor o Tu Desprecio
- 1. "Tu Amor o Tu Desprecio" Released: March 24, 2003; 2. "Que Te Quieran Más Que Yo" Released: July 28, 2003; 3. "Más Que Tu Amigo" Released: October 13, 2003; 4. "Prefiero Partir" Released: January 5, 2004

Tu Amor o Tu Desprecio (English: Your Love or Your Disdain) is the fifth studio album recorded by Mexican singer-songwriter Marco Antonio Solís. It was released by Fonovisa Records on May 13, 2003 (see 2003 in music). The album became his third number-one hit as a solo artist on the Billboard Top Latin Albums chart, won a Latin Grammy Award for Best Regional Mexican Song and won Album of the Year at Premio Lo Nuestro 2004. "Más Que Tu Amigo" served as the opening theme for the telenovela Velo de novia (2003), produced by Juan Osorio starring Susana González and Eduardo Santamarina.

== Track listing ==
All songs written and composed by Marco Antonio Solís except where noted

No.	Title	Length
1.	"Tu Amor o Tu Desprecio"	3:14
2.	"Con la Vida Comprada"	3:36
3.	"El Milagrito"	3:34
4.	"Que Te Quieran Mas Que Yo"	4:19
5.	"El Diablillo"	3:45
6.	"Ni Alla Donde Te Fuiste"	2:21
7.	"Más Que Tu Amigo"	3:29
8.	"Te Me Vas"	3:50
9.	"Prefiero Partir"	3:32
10.	"Las Noches Las Hago Dias" (written by Rafael Rosales Briseño)	2:53

== Credits and personnel ==
This information from Allmusic.

- Homero Patrón — Piano, arranger, producer, direction, synthesizer
- Marco Antonio Solís – Direction, assistant arranger, realization
- David Appelt — Mixing
- Carlos Castro – Assistant engineer, mixing
- Marco Gamboa – Editing, digital sequencing, copyist
- Ron McMaster — Mastering
- Víctor Aguilar – Drums
- José Guadalupe Alfaro — Vihuela
- Luis Conte — Latin percussion
- Pedro Iniguez — Accordion
- Abraham Laboriel – Electric bass
- Jorge Moraga — Strings, string coordinator
- Ramon Stagnaro – Guitar, requinto
- David Corpus – vocals
- Ismael Gallegos – Vocals
- Bolero Soul – Vocals
- Arturo Gutiérrez – Vocals
- José Luis Gutiérrez – Vocals

== Chart performance ==
Chart (2003)	Peak position
US Billboard Top Latin Albums	1
US Billboard Regional/Mexican Albums	1
US Billboard 200	54

== Sales and certifications ==
Region	Certification	Certified units/sales
Argentina (CAPIF)	Platinum	40,000^{^}
Central America (CFC)	Gold	10,000
Mexico (AMPROFON)	Platinum	150,000^{^}
United States (RIAA)	4× Platinum (Latin)	400,000^{^}
^{^} Shipments figures based on certification alone.
