= Latin Grammy Award for Best Tejano Album =

Music award category

- Awarded for: quality albums of the tejano music genre
- Country: United States
- Presented by: The Latin Recording Academy
- First award: 2000
- Currently held by: Bobby Pulido for Bobby Pulido & Friends: Una Tuya y Una Mía (Vol. 1/En Vivo) (2026)
- Website: latingrammy.com

The Latin Grammy Award for Best Tejano Album is an honor presented annually at the Latin Grammy Awards, a ceremony that recognizes excellence and creates a wider awareness of cultural diversity and contributions of Latin recording artists in the United States and internationally. The award goes to solo artists, duos, or groups for releasing vocal or instrumental albums containing at least 51% of new recordings in the tejano music genre.

Jimmy González y Grupo Mazz are the biggest winners in this category with six awards, including four years in a row from 2001 to 2004, and they are followed by Bobby Pulido with three. Los Palominos, with two, were the first winners of this category in 2000 for the album Por Eso Te Amo. In 2008, Emilio Navaira became the first solo singer to earn this award for the album De Nuevo.

To date the award has only been presented to artists originating from the United States, most of them chicanos. This is the only category that features no winners or nominees from a Latin American country.

== Winners and nominees ==
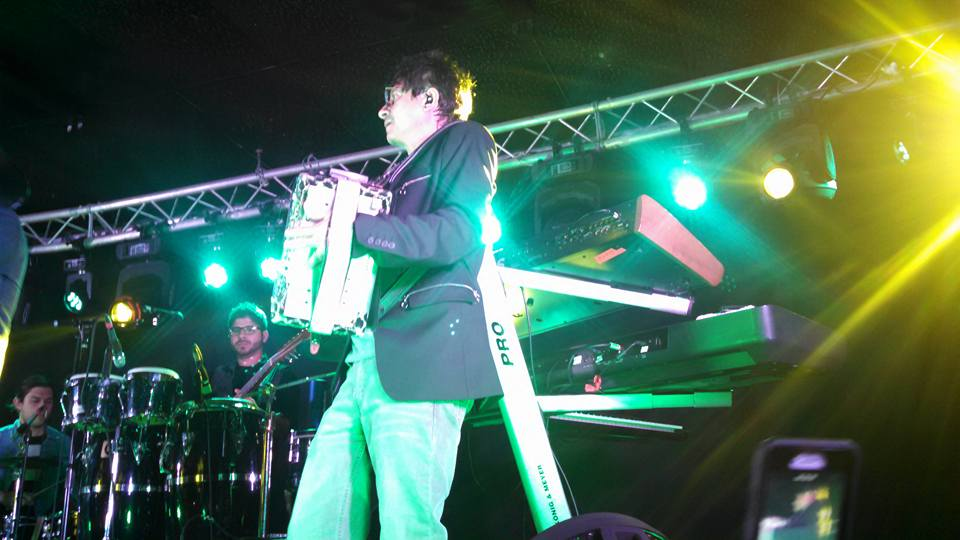

Armando Lichtenberger Jr. (top) and Oscar De La Rosa (bottom), members of the two-time winner band La Mafia

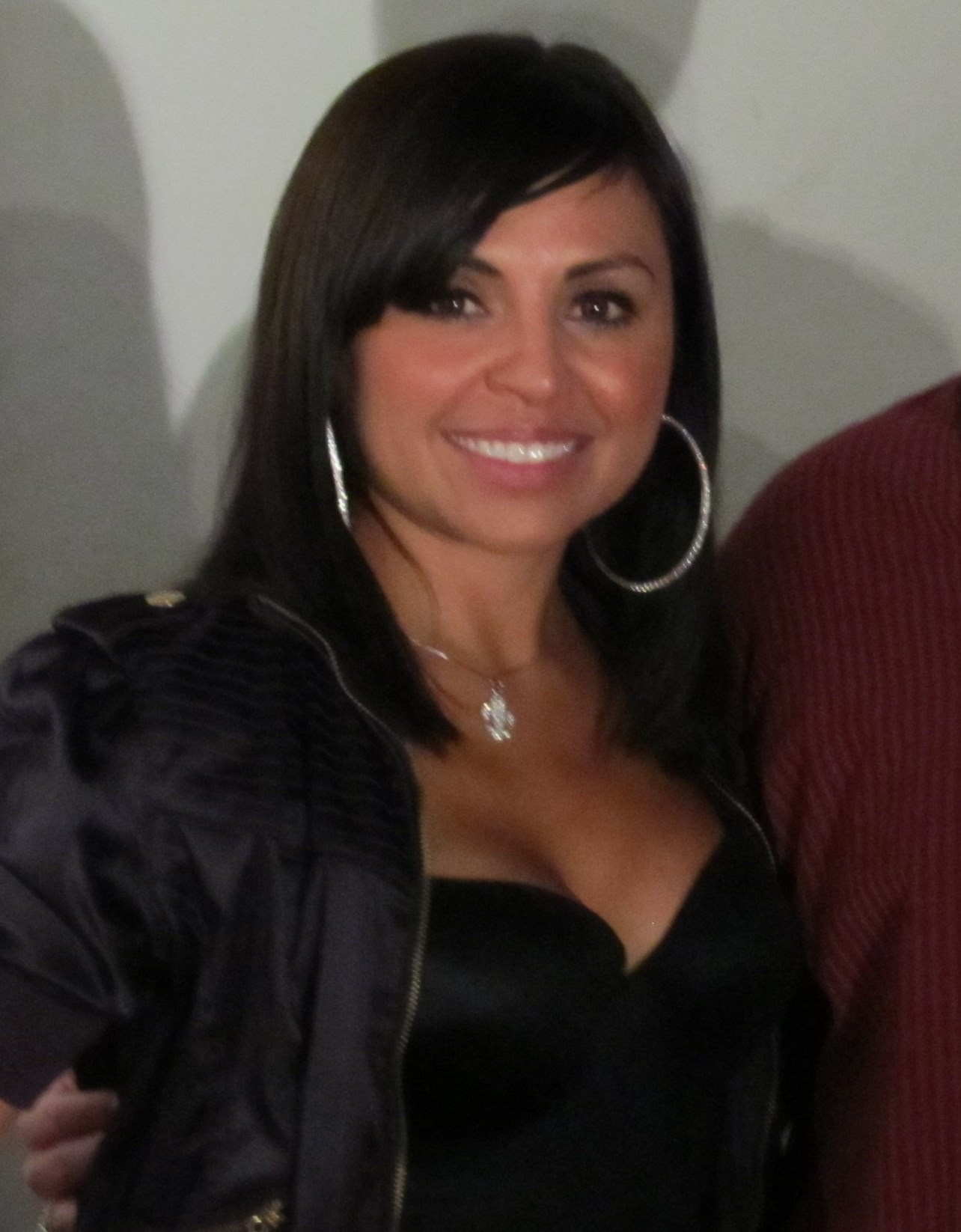
American singer Elida Reyna has won twice alongside her band Elida y Avante.

2016 winner Michael Salgado.

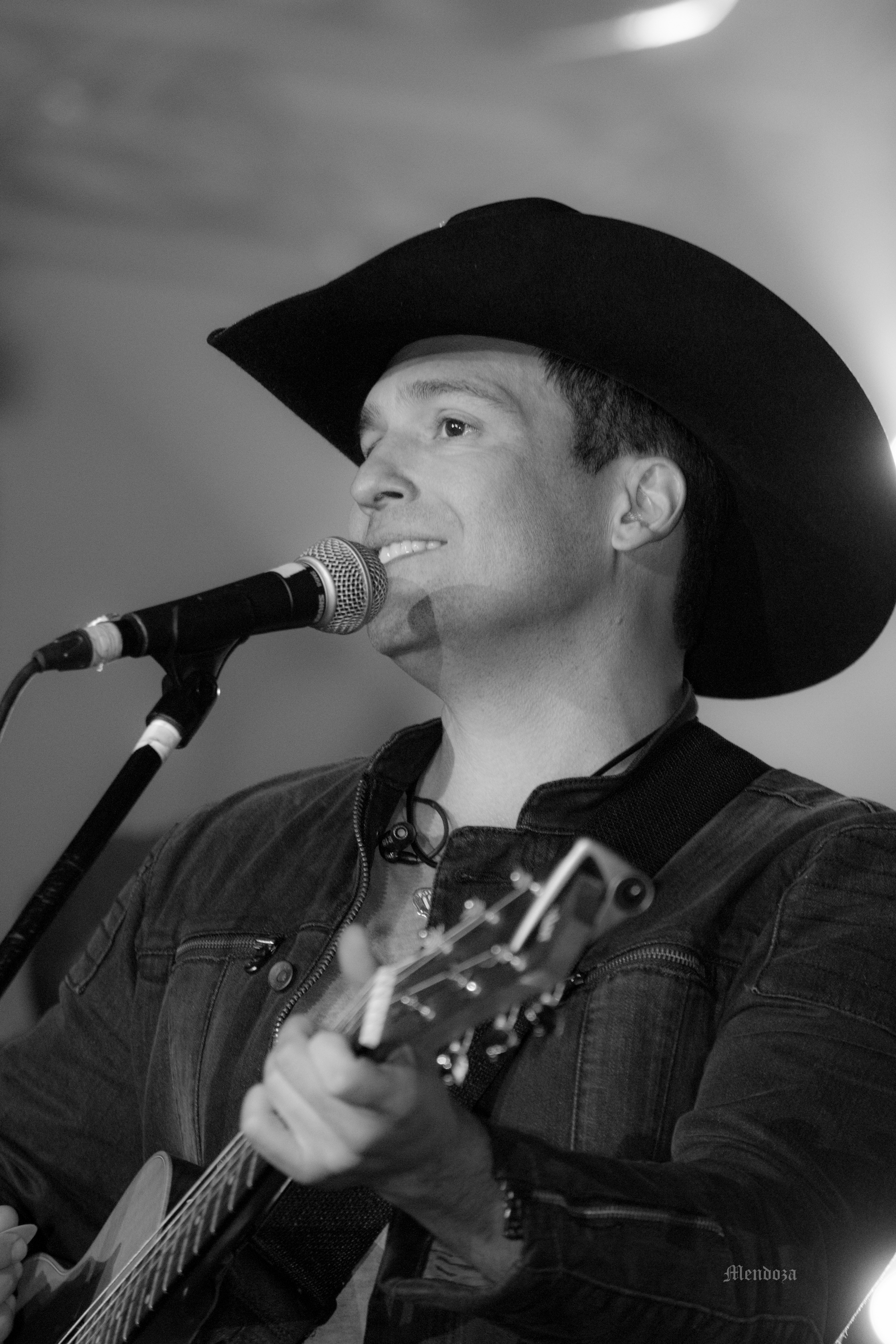
Bobby Pulido has won the award three times, in 2022, 2025 and 2026.

Year^{[I]}	Performing artist(s)	Work	Nominees	Ref.
2000	Los Palominos	Por Eso Te Amo	David Lee Garza & Los Musicales – Nadie Como Yo; Stefani Montiel – Dulce Sensación; Bobby Pulido – El Cazador; A.B. Quintanilla & Los Kumbia Kings – Amor, Familia Y Respeto	
2001	Jimmy González y Grupo Mazz	Quién Iba a Pensar	Emilio – El Rey del Rodeo; David Lee Garza & Los Musicales – 20/20; Los Palominos – Obsesión; A.B. Quintanilla & Los Kumbia Kings – Shhh!	
2002	Jimmy González y Grupo Mazz	Siempre Humilde	David Lee Garza & Los Musicales – Estamos Unidos; Ram Herrera – Ingrata; La Mafia – Inconfundible; Los Desperadoz – Desde El Corazón	
2003	Jimmy González y Grupo Mazz	Si Me Faltas Tu	Jaime y Los Chamacos – Conjunto Power; Emilio Navaira – Acuérdate; Jay Perez – Hombre En La Luna; Ruben Ramos & The Revolution – El Gato Negro On The Prowl	
2004	Jimmy González y Grupo Mazz	Live en el Valle	La Tropa F – Un Nuevo Capítulo; Little Joe & La Familia – Celebration Of Life – Volume Two Live; Bobby Pulido – Móntame; Sólido – Vuelve	
2005	David Lee Garza, Joel Guzmán and Sunny Sauceda	Polkas, Gritos y Acordeónes	David Lee Garza & Los Musicales – Solo Contigo; Jimmy González y Grupo Mazz – Para Mi Gente; La Tropa F – Milagro; Bobby Pulido – Vive	
2006	La Mafia	Nuevamente	Jimmy González y Grupo Mazz – Mejor Que Nunca; Las 3 Divas – Las 3 Divas; Little Joe & La Familia – Chicanisimo; Joe Posada – Amor y Fuego	
2007	Los Palominos	Evoluciones	La Tropa F – Exitos De Combate; The Legends – Otra Vez Raices; Joe López and Jimmy González y Grupo Mazz – Mazz Live Reunion: The Last Dance; David Marez – Corazón de Oro; Joe Posada – Despacito	
2008	Emilio Navaira	De Nuevo	Chente Barrera & Taconazo – Music Lessons; Jimmy González y Grupo Mazz – Incomparable; Freddie Martínez – The Legend Returns; Elida Reyna – Domingo	
2009	Jimmy González y Grupo Mazz	The Legend Continues...La Continuation	Avizo – Recordando Josefa; Grupo Vida – Generations; Joel Guzman and Sarah Fox – Conjuntazzo; Jaime & Los Chamacos – Freedom Tour 2008; Jay Perez – All The Way Live!	
2010	Elida Reyna & Avante	Fantasia	Little Joe & La Familia – A Night Of Classics In El Chuco; Joe Posada – Point of View; Ruben Ramos & The Mexican Revolution – Revolutionized; Sunny Sauceda y Todo Eso – Homenaje A Mi Padre	
2011	Little Joe & La Familia	Recuerdos	Chente Barrera – El Número Siete; Joe Posada – In The Pocket; Sunny Sauceda y Todo Eso – Camaleón; Tortilla Factory – Cookin'	
2012	Joe Posada	Algo Esta Pasando	Avizo – Mas Amigos; Los Desperadoz – Sunset Run; Los Hermanos Farías – Back On Track; Jay Perez – The Voice of Authority	
2013	David Lee Garza	Just Friends	Shaggy García and Grupo Recuerdo – Solo Tencha; Los Texmaniacs – Texas Towns & Tex-Mex Sounds; Jay Perez – New Horizons; Siggno – El Mundo Se Acabó	
2014	Jimmy González y Grupo Mazz	Forever Mazz	Chente Barrera – ¡Viva Tejano!; Grupo Alamo – Seguimos Soñando; Shelly Lares – De Mi Corazón; Jay Perez – Anthology Back In The Day	
2015	Sólido	Sentimientos	Alazzan – Tributo Al Amor y Dolor; La Fiebre – Nueva Era; Los Gallitos – Dueña de Mi Amor; Ruben Ramos and the Mexican Revolution – El Ídolo de Tejas; Elisa Reyna and Avante – Al Fin Completa	
2016	Michael Salgado	Por Cielo y Tierra	Ram Herrera – Mucho Mas Que Amor; The Legends – La Historia de La Musica Tejana; Marian y Mariel – Vulnerable a Ti; Jay Perez – Un Amigo Tendras	
2017	Not awarded			
2018	Roger Velásquez & The Latin Legendz	Tex Mex Funk	Jimmy González y Grupo Mazz – Porque Todavía Te Quiero; Grupo Alamo – Próximo Nivel; Proyecto Insomnio – Dolce Inferno: Dolce; Michael Salgado – Otras Historias	
2019	Elida Reyna and Avante	Colores	El Plan – Siete; Lucky Joe – Tu Príncipe; David Lee Rodriquez – Así Me Enseñaron; Vidal – Nunca Te Rindas	
2020	La Mafia	Live in México	El Plan – Pa'La Pista y Pa'l Pisto, Vol. 1; Jay Perez and The Band – 25th Anniversary Contigo; Siggno – Película, Vol. 1; South Tx Homies – It's Time	
2021	El Plan	Pa' la Pista y Pa'l Pisto, Vol. 2	Ram Herrera – Back on Track; La Fiebre – Histórico; Solido – Incomparable; Vilax – Un Beso es Suficiente	
2022	Bobby Pulido	Para Que Baile Mi Pueblo	El Plan – Despreciado; Grupo Álamo – Camino al Progreso; Isabel Marie – Una Ilusión; Destiny Navaira – Dime Cómo se Siente	
2023	Juan Treviño	Para Empezar a Amar	Gary Hobbs – Sin Fin; Jay Perez – El Patrón; Proyecto Insomnio – Super Heroes de Blanco; Vilax – Ganas	
2024	El Plan	Imperfecto	Gabriella – Siempre Gabriella; Vilax – Ganas (Deluxe)	
2025	Bobby Pulido	Bobby Pulido & Friends: Una Tuya y Una Mía (Vol. 1/En Vivo)	El Plan – Imperfecto, Vol. 2; Gabriella – Yo No Te Perdí; Grupo Cultura – Reflexiones; Marian y Mariel – El Siguiente Paso (Live Session); Juan Treviño – 6	
2026	Bobby Pulido	Bobby Pulido & Friends: Una Tuya y Una Mía (Vol. 2/En Vivo)	Kevin Aguilar – Mi Gran Noche - Raphael en la Voz de Kevin Aguilar; Destiny Navaira – 3; Jay Pérez – Le Seguiremos; Vilax – Capítulo 8	

^{^[I]} Each year is linked to the article about the Latin Grammy Awards held that year.

== See also ==
- Grammy Award for Best Tejano Album
- Grammy Award for Best Regional Mexican or Tejano Album
- Latin Grammy Award for Best Regional Song
