= Grammy Award for Best Tejano Album =

Grammy Award category for Tejano music

- Description: Award for quality Tejano music albums
- Country: United States
- Presented by: The Recording Academy
- Most wins: Jimmy Gonzalez & Grupo Mazz (5 wins)
- Website: www.grammy.com

The Grammy Award for Best Tejano Album was awarded from 1999 to 2011. In its first year the award was titled Best Tejano Music Performance and in 2000 it was awarded as Best Tejano Performance. The current title has been used since 2001. From 1993 to 1998 Tejano was included in the award for Best Mexican-American/Tejano Music Performance.

The award was discontinued from 2012 in a major overhaul of Grammy categories. From 2012, this category and Best Regional Mexican Album merged to form the Best Regional Mexican or Tejano Album category.

Years reflect the year in which the Grammy Awards were presented, for works released in the previous year.

== Recipients ==
Year	Winner(s)	Title	Nominees	Ref.
1999	Flaco Jiménez	Said and Done	Fiebre for Live... En Concierto!; Jaime y Los Chamacos for Fanaticos; Leyendas y Raíces for Leyendas y Raíces; Little Joe & La Familia for 2000	
2000	Los Palominos (performer), Randy Miller (engineer), Armando Lichtenberger Jr. (producer)	Por Eso Te Amo	Intocable for Contigo; Jaime y Los Chamacos for Jaime y Los Chamacos; Jennifer y Los Jetz for Mariposa; A.B. Quintanilla y Los Kumbia Kings for Amor, Familia y Respeto...	
2001	The Legends (performer), Edward Pérez, Greg García (engineers), Freddie Martínez, Hugo Guerrero (producers & engineers)	¿Qué Es Música Tejana?	Jimmy Gonzalez y El Grupo Mazz for Quien Iva a Pensar; Leonardo Gonzales y Los Magnificos for Siempre Cuenta Conmigo; Jaime y Los Chamacos for En Vivo... Puro Party Liva II; Solido for Hasta la Cima del Cielo	
2002	Solido (performer), Edward Pérez, Ramiro Serna (engineers), Rolando Benavidez, Amado Garza Jr., Medardo Garza, Ben de León, Otoniel Peña Jr. (producers)	Nadie Como Tu	David Lee Garza y Los Musicales for 20/20 MMXX Twenty-Viente; Leonard Gonzales y Los Magnificos for Retro-Momentos; Los Palominos for Obsesion; Emilio Navaira for Lo Dice Tu Mirada	
2003	Emilio Navaira (performer), Gustavo Alphonso Miranda (engineer/mixer), Manuel Herrera Maldonado (producer)	Acuérdate	David Lee Garza y Los Musicales for Estamos Unidos; Little Joe & La Familia for Celebration of Life - Volume One - Live; Mingo Saldivar y Sus Tremendos Cuatro Espadas for A Taste of Texas; Siggno for Por Amor	
2004	Jimmy Gonzalez y El Grupo Mazz (performer), Edward Perez, Ramiro Serna (engineers), Jimmy Gonzalez (producer)	Si Me Faltas Tu	Frijoles Romanticos for Frijoles Romanticos; Eddie Gonzales for Un Poco de Cambio; Milagro for Despues de Todo; Bobby Pulido for Móntame	
2005	David Lee Garza, Joel Guzman, Sunny Sauceda	Polkas, Gritos y Acordeónes	Stefani Montiel for Takin' On the World; Emilio Navaira for Entre Amigos; Jay Perez for Mi Destino; Vida for Vivo	
2006	Little Joe y La Familia	Chicanisimo	Avizo for The Power of Friends; La Tropa F for Milagro; Joe Posada for Then & Now; The Royal Jesters for Odyssey the Journey	
2007	Chente Barrera	Sigue El Taconazo	Jimmy Edward for It's... All Right; Bob Gallarza for Live In Session; Jay Perez for All of Me; Rebecca Valadez for Rebecca Valadez	
2008	Little Joe & La Familia	Before the Next Teardrop Falls	Ram Herrera and the Outlaw Band for Ram Herrera and the Outlaw Band 2007; David Marez for Corazon de Oro; Rubén Ramos for 35th Anniversary; Sunny Sauceda for Vagar Libremente	
2009	Rubén Ramos & The Mexican Revolution	Viva La Revolucion	Chente Barrera y Taconazo for Music Lessons; Joe Posada for Friends & Legends; Tortilla Factory for All That Jazz...; Albert Zamora for Heir to the Throne	
2010	Los Texmaniacs	Borders y Bailes	Stefani Montiel for Divina; Jay Perez for All the Way Live; Joe Posada for Point of View; Sunny Sauceda y Todo Eso for Radiación Musical	
2011	Little Joe & La Familia	Recuerdos	Juan P. Moreno for Sabes Bien; Joe Posada for In the Pocket; Sunny Sauceda y Todo Eso for Homenaje A Mi Padre; Tortilla Factory for Cookin	
