= Siempre Humilde =

Studio album by Jimmy González y Grupo Mazz
- Released: November 27, 2001
- Studios: Pro-Sound Studios, McAllen, Texas; Velásquez Sound Studios, San Antonio, Texas
- Genre: Tejano
- Length: 37:03
- Label: Freddie Records

Jimmy González y Grupo Mazz chronology
Quién Iba a Pensar (2000)	Siempre Humilde (2001)	Si Me Faltas Tu (2002)

Siempre Humilde (English: Always Humble) is the second album by Jimmy González y Grupo Mazz and was released on November 27, 2001 with Freddie Records. It won González y Grupo Mazz their second Latin Grammy for Best Tejano Album.

== Track listing ==
No.	Title	Writer(s)	Length
1.	"Ahora Qué Hago Sin Ti"	Jimmy González	3:49
2.	"Amorcito Mío"	Joan Sebastián	3:33
3.	"Por Mientras"	Freddie Martinez	4:06
4.	"Fíjate Que No"	Humberto Ramón	3:25
5.	"La Cumbia Barulera"		3:24
6.	"Yo Quería"	C. Castro; T. Cotugno; S. Glacobbe	4:02
7.	"Pues Qué Te Parece"	González	3:28
8.	"Quiero Ser Tu Amor"	Luis Silva	3:52
9.	"Llévate Todo"	Javier Aguirre	3:32
10.	"Open Arms"	Steve Perry; Jonathan Cain	3:52
Total length:			37:03

== Personnel ==
- Jimmy González – lead vocals, producer, mixing, mastering
- Xavier Padilla – keyboards
- Johnny Rodriguez – keyboards
- Michael González – drums
- Albert Flores – percussion
- Frankie Caballero – accordion
- Rebecca Valadez – vocals
- Joe Borrego – vocals
- Art Ramirez – bass
- Homero Esquivel – accordion
- Danny Sanchez – bajo sexto
- Felix Salinas – bass
- Jerry de la Rosa – keyboards
- Chente Barrera – drums on "Quiero Ser Tu Amor"
- Lupe Degollado – bajo sexto
- Henry Gómez – Mariachi Aguila
- David Villarreal – trumpet
- Juan Santillan – güiro, timbales
- Freddie Martínez Jr. – executive producer
- Jesse Cavazos – mixing, mastering, recording
- Gilbert Velásquez – recording
- Jorge Flores – graphic design
- Freeze Frame Studio – photography

== Awards ==
3rd Annual Latin Grammy Awards
Year	Title	Category	Result
2002	Siempre Humilde	Best Tejano Album	Won
2002	"Ahora Que Hago Sin Ti"	Best Regional Mexican Song	Nominated
