= Mazz Fuerte Que Nunca =

Studio album by Joe López y la Nueva Imagen Mazz
- Released: March 27, 2001
- Studios: V-Music, San Antonio, Texas
- Genres: Tejano; ranchera; cumbia; ballad
- Language: Spanish
- Label: EMI Latin
- Producer: Gilbert Velasquez

Joe López chronology
Mazz Fuerte Que Nunca (2001)	A Mi Manera (2003)

Singles from Mazz Fuerte Que Nunca
- 1. "Infiel" Released: 2001; 2. "Mala Mujer" Released: 2001

Mazz Fuerte Que Nunca (English: Stronger Than Ever (Note: The translated title is likely not "Mazz Stronger Than Ever". The name "Mazz" originates from "más". The album title is thus probably a play on "Más Fuerte Que Nunca", which would translate simply to "Stronger Than Ever". Also, there is no separator between "Mazz" and "Fuerte Que Nunca", supporting that "Mazz" is to be read as though it were "Más".)) is the only studio album by Joe López y la Nueva Imagen Mazz and was released March 27, 2001. It contains the hits "Infiel" and "Perdona Cariño."

== Production ==
In an interview for The Monitor López told that he was motivated to record "Infiel" for love of Rocío Dúrcal's version as used in the opening sequence of the telenovela Mujeres Engañadas, and which was released on her album Caricias a year prior: "I love novelas and the way Rocio Durcal sings 'Infiel,' then I added the old style of Mazz". He also stated that he "recorded 17 songs from which I picked 10 for the CD, which took me three years to finish", and that "[t]he difference on this CD is that I brought back the synthesizer, which replaces the accordion, congas and all kinds of instruments, and this makes the CD 100 percent Tejano".

For Abilene Reporter-News López expressed satisfaction at the success of Mazz Fuerte Que Nunca: "In three days, I have sold close to 210,000 copies and in two weeks 430,000 CDs. Never in my career have I done this [...] I guess people were waiting for the CD", going on to say, "I'm doing it all my style, the style I started In 1978. There was no other Tejano style with the synthesizer, orchestra and keyboards."

Interviewed by Tejano reporter Ramiro Burr, López stated: "[The] album was a real challenge (for me) as a singer. I tried to sing in the higher keys. I added more heart to it. I even cried on . . . Perdona Cariño. That's how much feeling I put into them."

== Track listing ==
No.	Title	Writer(s)	Length
1.	"Perdona Cariño"	J. Ramos	4:19
2.	"Soy Yo"	Armando Manzanero	4:00
3.	"Mala Mujer"	Joe López	3:34
4.	"Atrápalo"	Jessie Rodriguez; Brando Mireles	4:04
5.	"Fuimos Capaz"	Rodriguez; Mireles	4:17
6.	"Infiel"	Victor Yunés Castillo	3:38
7.	"Dices Que Te Vas"	López	3:29
8.	"Ojitos Azules"	López	3:35
9.	"Ay, Ay, Ay"	Mireles	4:26
10.	"Todo Sigue Igual"	Jorge Luis Borrego	3:59
Total length:			39:21

Notes

- "Mala Mujer" was released on a promotional disc with "Dime (Que Tú Eres)" by once Mazz backup singer Margarita and "Dos Corazones" by Texas Latino.
- López recorded a music video for "Infiel," which may be viewed on YouTube. The middle name of the song's writer as spelled in the CD credits, "Yunez," is incorrect.

== Personnel ==
- Joe López – lead vocals
- Brando Mireles – arrangements; musical direction; keyboards
- Richard Barron – drums; percussion (track 7)
- Danny Rodriguez – bass guitar
- Tony Cisneros – guitar
- Gilbert Velasquez – producer; arrangements; electric guitar; acoustic guitar (track 4)
- Roy Paniagua – bass guitar (tracks 1, 3, 6, 7, 8, 9); backing vocals (track 9)
- Jorge Alejandro – bass guitar (tracks 2, 5)
- Chente Barrera – drums (tracks 2, 3, 4, 6, 8, 9); backing vocals (tracks 4, 5, 7, 9, 10)
- Henry Brun – percussion (tracks 2, 5, 10)
- Frankie Caballero and Ray de Leon – accordion (tracks 3, 8)
- Monica Rodriguez – backing vocals (tracks 4, 5)
- Judi de Leon – backing vocals (track 9)
- Nelson Gonzales – art direction
