= Quién Iba a Pensar =

Studio album by Jimmy González y Grupo Mazz
- Released: June 18, 2000
- Studios: Blue Cat Recording Studios, San Antonio, Texas; Padre Sound Recording, Brownsville, Texas; Pro-Sound Studios, McAllen, Texas
- Genre: Tejano
- Length: 39:19
- Label: Freddie Records

Jimmy González y Grupo Mazz chronology
Quién Iba a Pensar (2000)	Siempre Humilde (2001)

Singles from Quién Iba a Pensar
- 1. "Quién Iba a Pensar"

Quién Iba a Pensar (English: Who Would Have Thought) is the first album by Jimmy González y Grupo Mazz and was released on June 18, 2000 with Freddie Records. Its title has also appeared as "Quien Iva a Pensar" in press and on the demo tape González submitted to Freddie Records. The album won González y Grupo Mazz their first Latin Grammy.

== Track listing ==
No.	Title	Writer(s)	Length
1.	"Quién Iba a Pensar"	Jimmy González	3:58
2.	"Amor"	González	4:31
3.	"El Guarare"		3:15
4.	"Se Fué"	Humberto Ramón	3:36
5.	"Por Amarte Asi"	Eduardo Reyes; Alejandro Montalban	4:25
6.	"A Pesar de Todo"	Richard Allen	3:43
7.	"Doña Juana"		3:21
8.	"Por Que Te Quiero"	Ramón	3:23
9.	"No Te la Lleves"	Ramón	3:40
10.	"Corazón Espinado"	Fher Olvera	5:27
Total length:			39:19

== Personnel ==
- Jimmy González – lead vocals, guitars, executive producer, arrangements
- Joe B. – backing vocals
- Michael González – drums, percussion
- Frankie Caballero – accordion
- Adolfo García – drums, percussion
- Xavier Padilla – keyboards
- Johnny Rod – keyboards
- Carlos González – bass
- Jerry de la Rosa – keyboards
- Mario González – bass
- Max Baca – bajo sexto
- Homero Esquivel – accordion
- Rebecca Valadez – backing vocals
- Angela Mezquite – backing vocals
- Adolfo García Jr. – percussion
- Doug Shannon – album biography
- Leticia Garza – album biography
- Jorge Flores – graphic design
- Freeze Frame Studio – photography

== Awards ==
Tejano Music Awards
Year	Category
2001	Album of the Year (Group)

2nd Annual Latin Grammy Awards
Year	Category	Result
2002	Best Tejano Album	Won
