= Gracias Por Estar Aquí =

Studio album by Marco Antonio Solís
- Released: October 22, 2013
- Recorded: 2012–2013
- Studios: EastWest Studios (Hollywood, California); Puntorec Studios (Turin, Italy); The Cavern Studios (Westlake Village, California)
- Genre: Latin pop
- Length: 34:50
- Labels: Habari Inc; Universal Music Latino
- Producer: Marco Antonio Solís

Marco Antonio Solís chronology
En Total Plenitud (2010)	Gracias Por Estar Aquí (2013)

Singles from Gracias Por Estar Aquí
- 1. "Tres Semanas" Released: July 15, 2013; 2. "De Mil Amores" Released: January 6, 2014; 3. "Lo Mejor Para los Dos" Released: July 7, 2014; 4. "Renuncio a Estar Contigo" Released: December 1, 2014; 5. "Gracias Por Estar Aquí" Released: April 13, 2015; 6. "Todo Vuelve a Su Ritmo" Released: July 20, 2015

Gracias Por Estar Aquí (Eng.: "Thank You For Being Here") is the tenth studio album by Mexican singer-songwriter Marco Antonio Solís. It was released by Universal Music Latino on October 22, 2013 (see 2013 in music).

Gracias Por Estar Aquí reached number one on the Billboard Top Latin Albums chart in the United States. Two singles were released from the album: "Tres Semanas" and "De Mil Amores". The album earned a Grammy nomination for Best Latin Pop Album at the 57th Annual Grammy Awards, a Latin Grammy nomination for Best Traditional Pop Vocal Album, and a Premio Lo Nuestro nomination for Pop Album of the Year at Premio Lo Nuestro 2015.

"Tres Semanas" was nominated for Pop Song of the Year at Premio Lo Nuestro 2015, while "De Mil Amores" was awarded a Latin Grammy Award for Best Regional Mexican Song. In Mexico, the album achieved Gold status.

== Background and release ==
The first single, "Tres Semanas" was released on July 15, 2013. The song became a number-one hit on the Mexican Monitor Latino chart. The official video for "Tres Semanas" premiered July 26, 2013. The album was made available for preorder on September 26, 2013. The official video for the second single "De Mil Amores" premiered on February 28, 2014.

== Reception ==
On August 3, 2014, Renuncio a Estar Contigo became a number-one hit on the Mexican Monitor Latino chart for four consecutive weeks. The album was nominated for Best Traditional Pop Vocal Album and "De Mil Amores" won a Latin Grammy Award for Best Regional Mexican Song at the Latin Grammy Awards of 2014. It was nominated for Best Latin Pop Album at the 57th Annual Grammy Awards. It was also nominated for Pop Album of the Year and "Tres Semanas" was nominated for Pop Song of the Year at Premio Lo Nuestro 2015.

== Track listing ==
All tracks are written by Marco Antonio Solís.

No.	Title	Length
1.	"Gracias Por Estar Aquí"	3:42
2.	"Lo Mejor Para los Dos"	3:08
3.	"Tres Semanas"	3:39
4.	"Todo Vuelve a Su Ritmo"	3:28
5.	"En Tu Propio Vuelo"	3:52
6.	"Tu Mirada En La Mia"	3:06
7.	"Lo Que Me Queda Por Vivir Sin Ti"	3:25
8.	"Renuncio a Estar Contigo"	3:53
9.	"Linda Noche Buena"	3:24
10.	"De Mil Amores"	3:03

A Deluxe Edition was released on April 29, 2014.

All songs written and composed by Marco Antonio Solís except "El Perdedor" by Enrique Iglesias and Descemer Bueno, and "Historia de un Amor" by Carlos Eleta Almarán

Deluxe Edition
No.	Title	Length
1.	"Gracias Por Estar Aquí"	3:42
2.	"Tres Semanas"	3:39
3.	"Lo Mejor Para los Dos"	3:08
4.	"Lo Que Me Queda Por Vivir Sin Ti"	3:25
5.	"De Mil Amores"	3:03
6.	"Linda Noche Buena"	3:24
7.	"Renuncio a Estar Contigo"	3:53
8.	"En Tu Propio Vuelo"	3:52
9.	"Tu Mirada En La Mia"	3:06
10.	"Todo Vuelve a Su Ritmo"	3:28
11.	"De Mil Amores" (Pop Version)	3:05
12.	"Renuncio a Estar Contigo" (Ranchera Version)	3:57
13.	"El Perdedor" (featuring Enrique Iglesias)	3:11
14.	"Historia de un Amor" (featuring David Bisbal)	3:36
15.	"Tu Carcel" (featuring Wisin & Yandel, David Bisbal, and Alejandra Guzmán)	2:51

Deluxe Edition DVD
No.	Title	Length
1.	"Gracias Por Estar Aquí" (EPK)
2.	"Tres Semanas"
3.	"De Mil Amores"
4.	"De Mil Amores" (Behind The Scenes)
5.	"El Perdedor"
6.	"Historia de un Amor"
7.	"Tu Carcel"

== Charts ==
=== Weekly charts ===
Chart (2013)	Peak position
US Top Latin Albums (Billboard)	1
US Latin Pop Albums (Billboard)	1

=== Year-end charts ===
Chart (2013)	Position
Argentinian Albums (CAPIF)	12
Chart (2014)	Position
US Latin Albums	9
US Latin Pop Albums	3

== Certifications ==
Region	Certification	Certified units/sales
Argentina (CAPIF)	Platinum	40,000^{^}
Mexico (AMPROFON)	Gold	30,000^{^}
^{^} Shipments figures based on certification alone.

== Personnel ==
The following credits are from AllMusic

- Pablo Aguirre Arreglos – Piano
- Paulina Aguirre – Coros
- Sergio Alonso Arpa
- Bartolomeo Angelillo – Violin
- Tamara Bairo – Viola
- Massimo Barbierato – Violin
- Donata Beggiora – Violin
- Silvia Colli – Violin
- Raúl Cuellar – Violin
- Claudio Curri – Violin
- Benny Faccone – Mezcla
- Roberto Giglio – Viola
- Eriola Gripshi – Viola
- Gianandrea Guerra – Violin
- Giovanna Guli – Violin
- Jesus "Chuy" Guzman – Violin
- Livia Hagiu – Violin
- Ismael Hernández – Violin
- Ian Holmes – Coros
- Fation Hoxolli – Violin
- Leyla Hoyle – Coros
- Marcelo Iacometti – Violin
- Juan Jiménez – Guitarron
- Héctor Kron – Creative Director
- German Lopez – Vihuela
- Roberto Lucano – Violin
- Hasani Luviona – Violin
- Simona Mana – Violin
- Michelangelo Cagnetta – Violin
- Federica Michelon – Viola
- Liliana Mitulescu – Viola
- Carlos Murguía – Coros
- Anna Paraschiv – Violin
- Juan Rodríguez – Violin
- Walter Rodriguez –Bateria
- Aba Rubolino – Viola
- Emanuelle Russo – Violin
- Marco Antonio Solís – Composer, Primary Artist
- Diana Subashi – Violin
- Serafino Tedesi – Violin

== See also ==
- List of number-one Billboard Latin Albums from the 2010s
- List of number-one Billboard Latin Pop Albums from the 2010s
