= Tres Semanas =

Single by Marco Antonio Solís

from the album Gracias Por Estar Aquí
- Released: 15 July 2013
- Genre: Latin pop • Regional Mexican • Latin ballad
- Length: 3:39
- Label: Habari Inc
- Songwriter: Marco Antonio Solís

Marco Antonio Solís singles chronology
"Él Nunca Te Olvida" (2011)	"Tres Semanas" (2013)	"De Mil Amores" (2014)

"Tres Semanas" (Three Weeks) is the first single of the album Gracias Por Estar Aquí. Its English translation is "three weeks". The song was written and performed by Mexican singer-songwriter Marco Antonio Solís. The song was nominated for a Lo Nuestro Award for Pop Song of the Year at the 27th Lo Nuestro Awards.

== Charts ==
=== Weekly charts ===
Chart (2013–2014)	Peak position
Mexico (Monitor Latino)	1
US Hot Latin Songs (Billboard)	12
US Latin Airplay (Billboard)	11
US Regional Mexican Airplay (Billboard)	8

=== Year-end charts ===
Chart (2013)	Position
US Hot Latin Songs (Billboard)	62
