= Latin Grammy Award for Best Regional Mexican Song =

Latin Grammy Award for Best Regional Song
- Awarded for: quality regional Mexican songs
- Country: United States
- Presented by: The Latin Recording Academy
- First award: 2000
- Currently held by: Edgar Barrera , Iván Gámez, Fabio Iván Gutiérrez Ramírez, Joshua Xavier Gutierrez, Luis Mexia & Adelaido "Payo" Solís III for "No Capea" (2026)

Highlights
- Most awards: Edgar Barrera (7)
- Most nominations: Edgar Barrera (18)
- Website: latingrammy.com

The Latin Grammy Award for Best Regional Mexican Song is an honor presented annually at the Latin Grammy Awards, a ceremony that recognizes excellence and creates a wider awareness of cultural diversity and contributions of Latin recording artists in the United States and internationally. The award is reserved to the songwriters of a new song containing at least 51% of the lyrics in Spanish. Instrumental recordings or cover songs are not eligible. Since its inception, the award category has had one name change. From 2000 to 2012 the award was known as Best Regional Mexican Song. In 2013, the category name was changed to Best Regional Song. In 2016, the award was changed back to Best Regional Mexican Song.

The award was first presented to Colombian songwriter Kike Santander for the track "Mi Verdad", performed by Mexican singer Alejandro Fernández. Edgar Barrera is the most awarded songwriter with seven wins; in 2011 Marco Antonio Solís' song "¿A Dónde Vamos a Parar?" became the first regional song to be nominated for Song of the Year.

The award has only been presented to songwriters originating from Colombia, Mexico and the United States.

== Winners and nominees ==
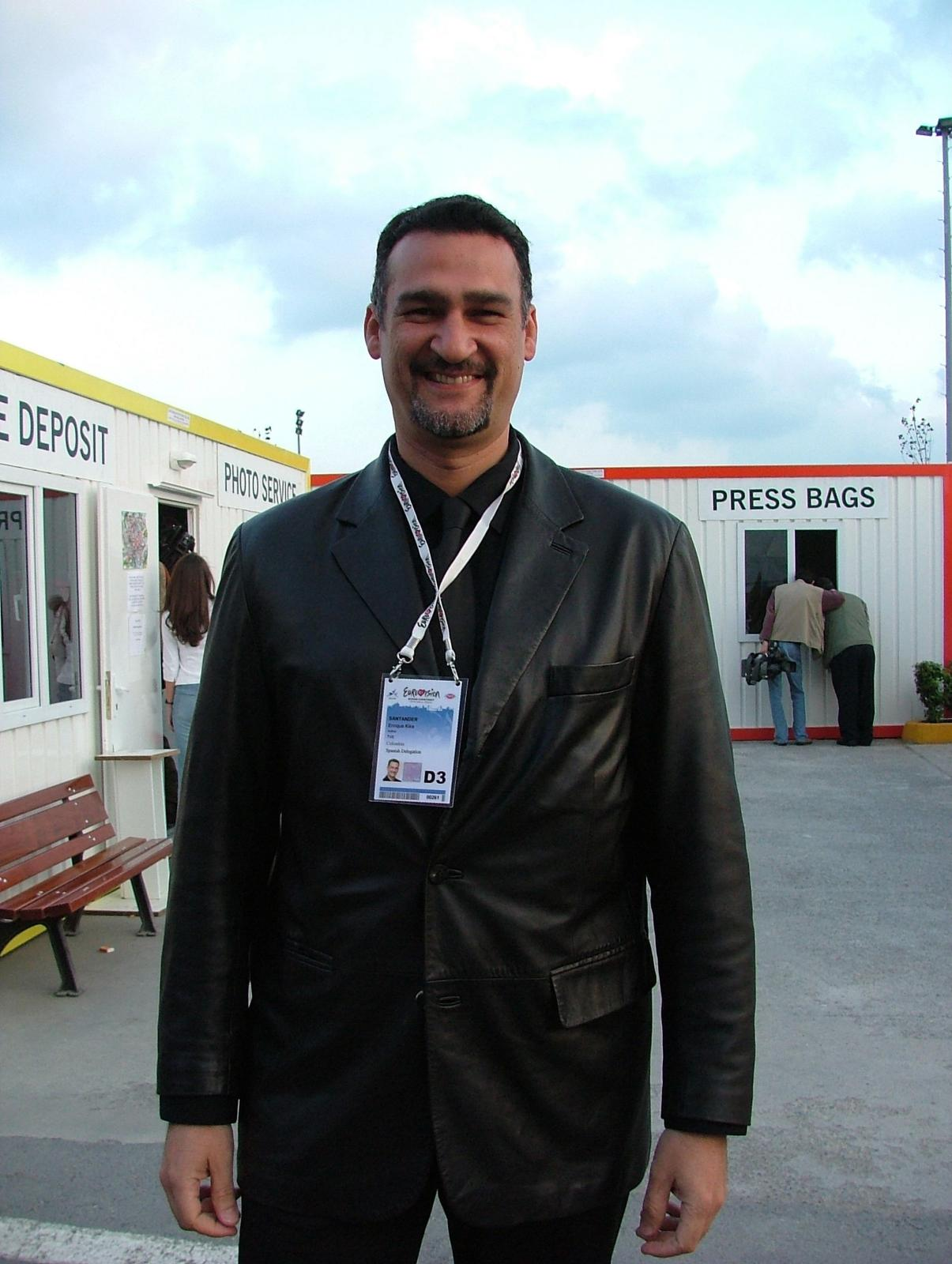
Kike Santander was the inaugural winner of the award.

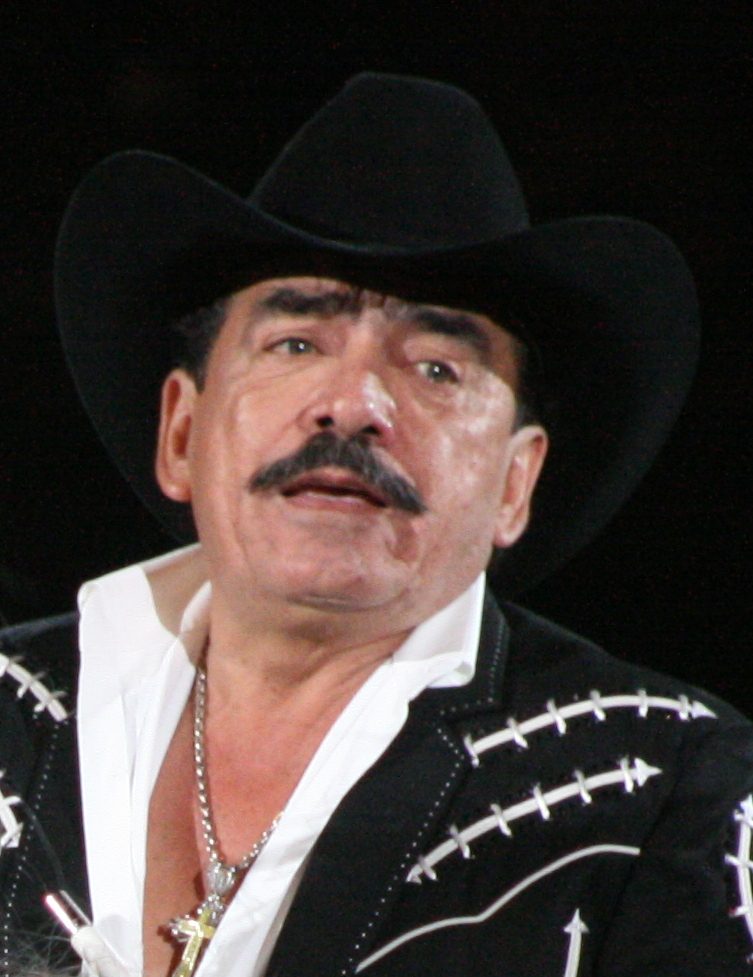
Two-time winner Joan Sebastian.

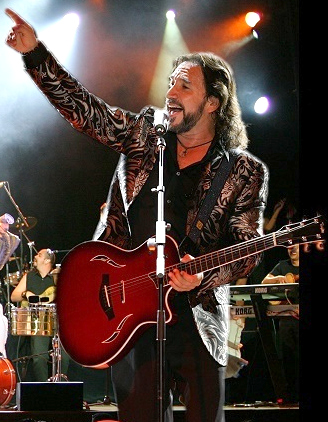
Four-time winner Marco Antonio Solís.

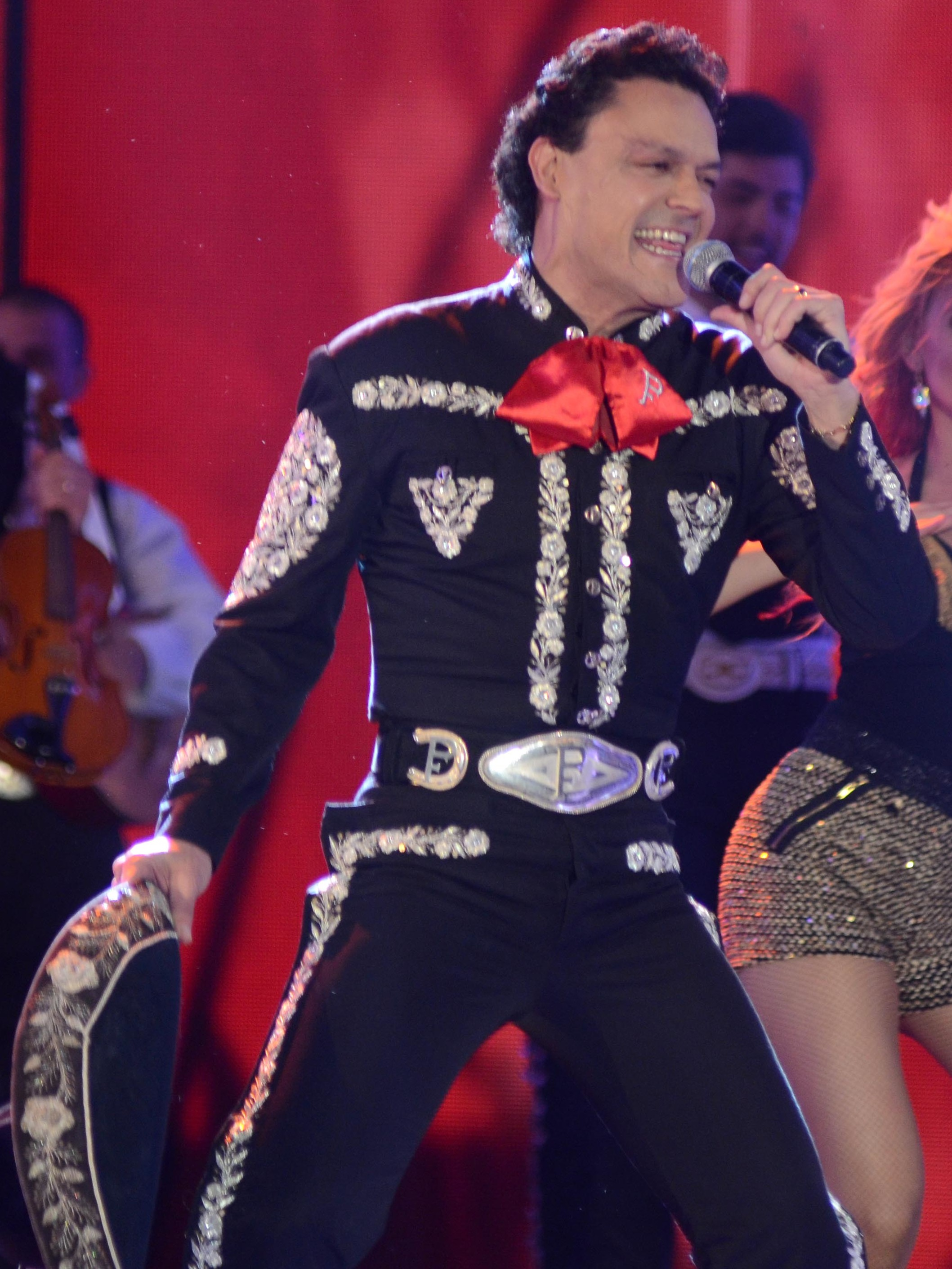
2013 winner Pedro Fernández.

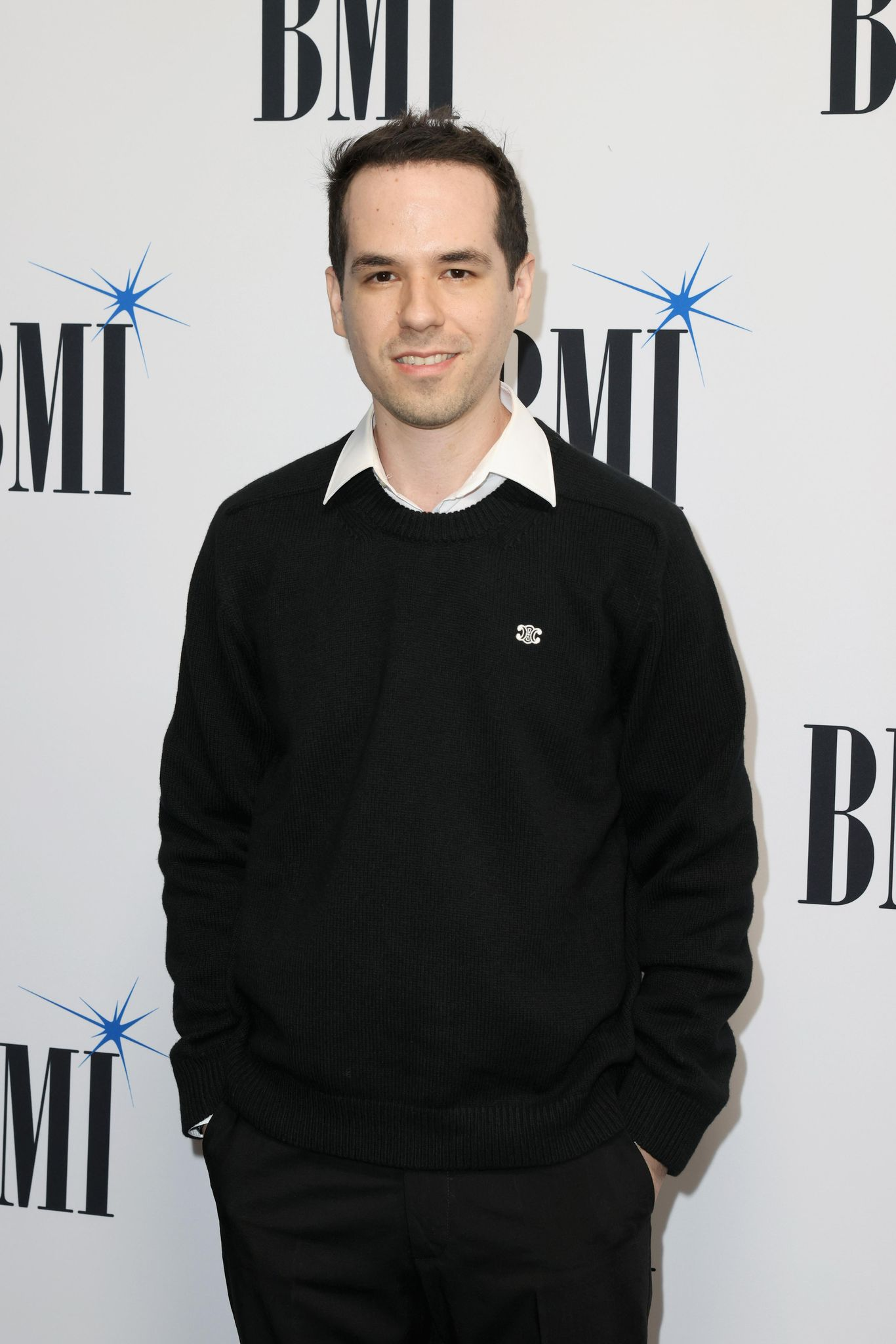
Six-time winner Édgar Barrera.

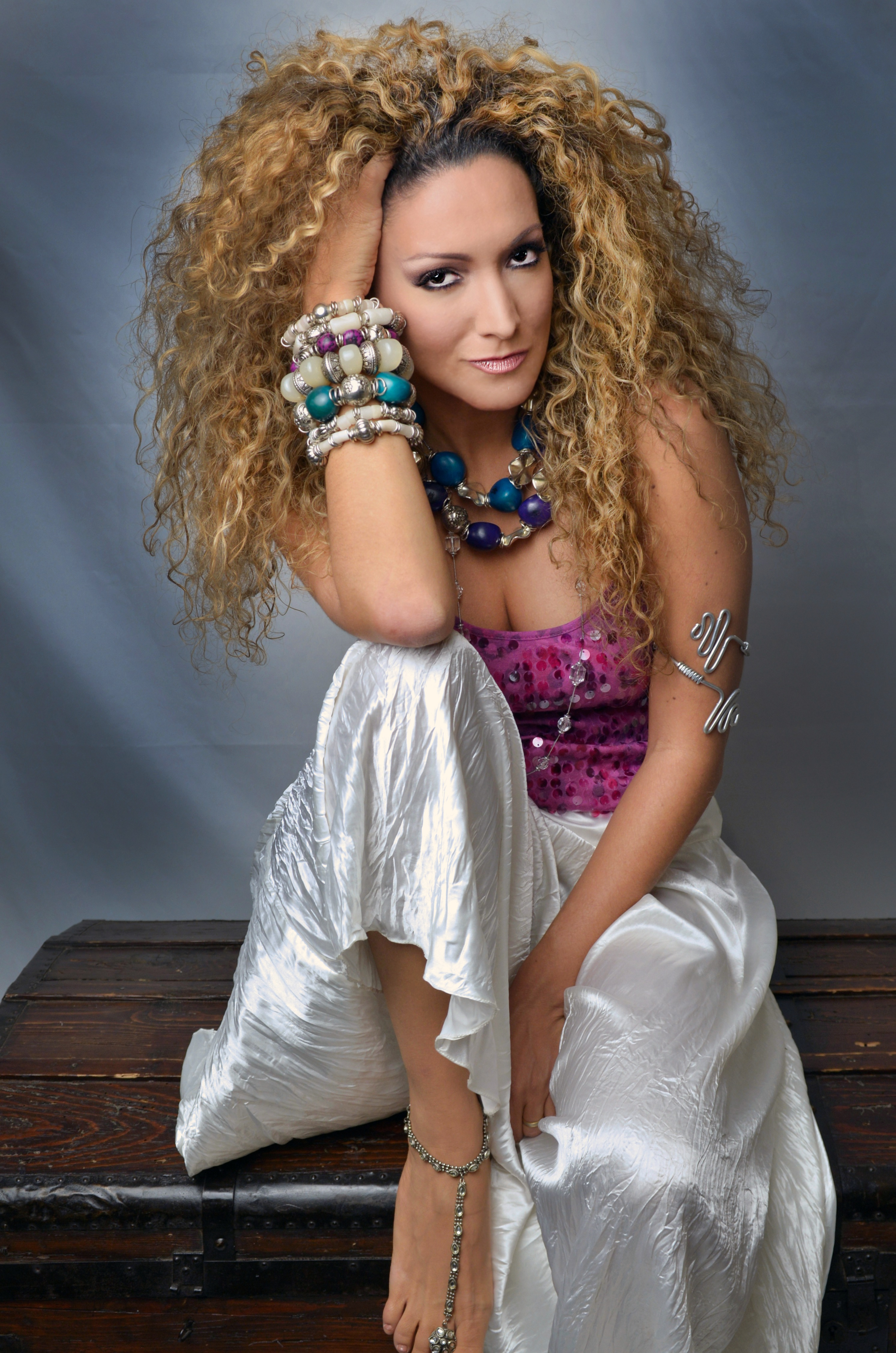
2016 winner Erika Ender.

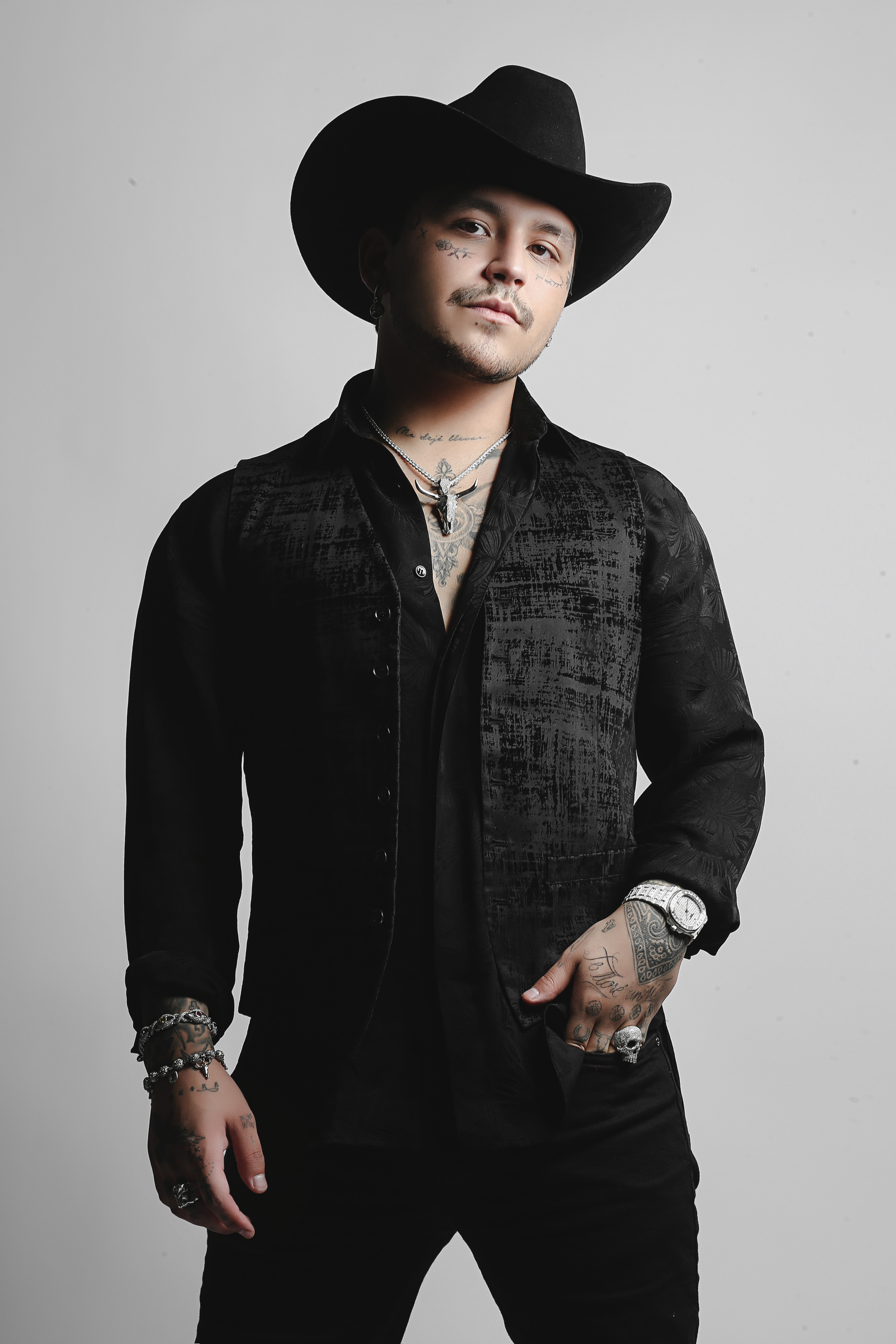
Three-time winner Christian Nodal.

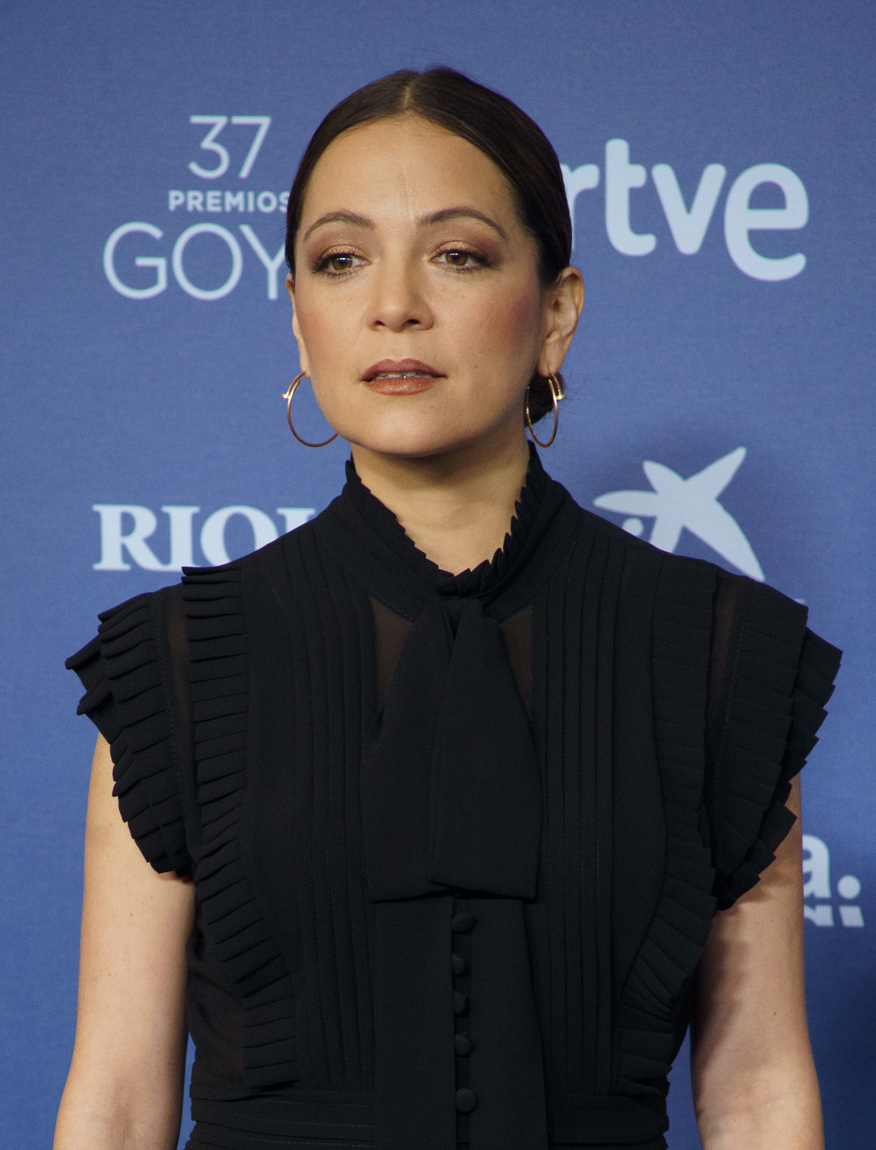
2020 winner Natalia Lafourcade.

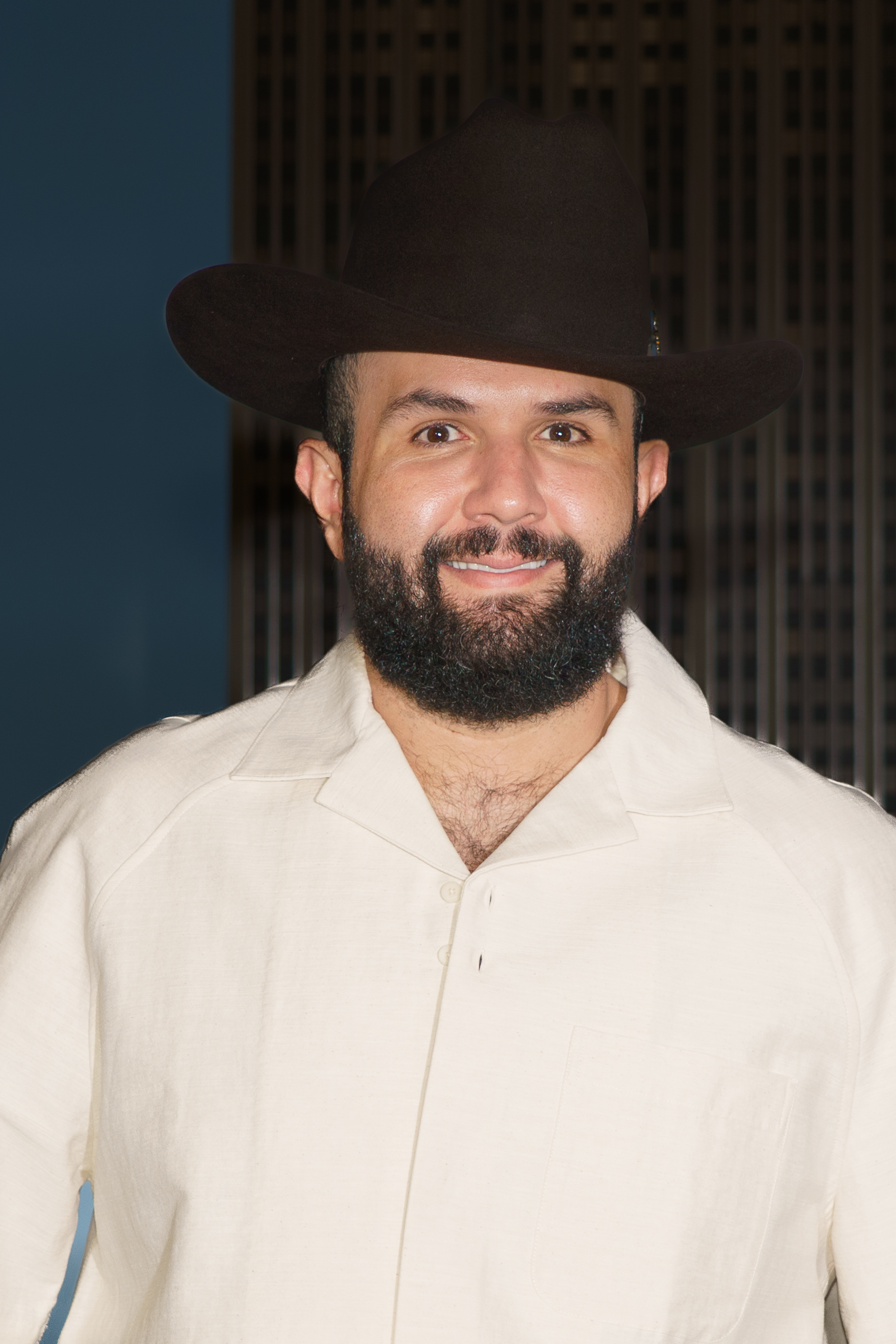
2022 winner Carín León.

Year^{[I]}	Songwriter(s)	Work	Performing artist(s)^{[II]}	Nominees	Ref.
2000	Kike Santander	"Mi Verdad"	Alejandro Fernández	Ricardo Ceratto – "Me Estoy Acostumbrando a Tí" (Pepe Aguilar); Massias – "Loco" (Alejandro Fernández); Juan Carlos Medrano – "El Carretonero" (Los Rieleros del Norte); Edel Ramírez – "No Debes Llorar" (Los Cosmos)	
2001	José Vaca Flores	"Borracho Te Recuerdo"	Vicente Fernández	Enrique Valencia – "De Paisano A Paisano" (Los Tigres del Norte); Francisco de Jesus Martínez – "Disculpe Usted" (Los Humildes); Oscar L. Treviño – "Mi Obsesión" (Los Palominos); Toscano – "Piérdeme El Respeto" (Paquita la del Barrio)	
2002	Freddie Martínez	"Del Otro Lado Del Porton"	Ramón Ayala y Sus Bravos del Norte	Jimmy González – "Ahora Que Hago Sin Ti" (Jimmy González y el Grupo Mazz); Joan Sebastian – "Apuesto" (Pepe Aguilar); Joan Sebastian – "Manantial De Llanto" (Joan Sebastián); Sylvia Ivañez and Bebu Silvetti – "Siempre Te Amaré" (Aida Cuevas)	
2003	Joan Sebastian	"Afortunado"	Joan Sebastian	A.B. Quintanilla and Alicia Villarreal – "Ay! Papacito" (Límite); Jimmy González – "Dame Un Minuto" (Jimmy González y el Grupo Mazz); Noe Hernández, Alfonso Lizárraga and Joel Lizárraga – "Las Vías Del Amor" (Banda el Recodo); Ramón González Mora – "Perdóname Mi Amor" (Conjunto Primavera)	
2004	Marco Antonio Solís	"Tu Amor O Tu Desprecio"	Marco Antonio Solís	Roberto Martínez – "¿A Donde Estabas?" (Intocable); Mario Quintero Lara – "Imperio" (Los Tucanes de Tijuana); José Cantoral – "José Pérez León" (Los Tigres del Norte); Freddie Martinez – "Titere en Tus Manos" (Ramón Ayala y Sus Bravos del Norte)	
2005	Josué Contreras & Johnny Lee Rosas	"Aire"	Intocable	Freddie Martínez – "Corazón Dormido" (Jimmy González y Grupo Mazz); Edel Ramírez – "Me Vuelvo Loco" (Los Palominos); Luigi Giraldo, Cruz "CK" Martínez and A.B. Quintanilla – "Na Na Na (Dulce Niña)" (Kumbia Kings)	
2006	Edgar Cortazar, Ernesto Cortazar & Tony Meléndez	"Aún Sigues Siendo Mia"	Conjunto Primavera	Mauricio L. Arriaga and J. E. Murgia – "Contra Viento y Marea" (Intocable); Freddie Martínez – "Corazón De Fierro" (Jimmy González y Grupo Mazz); Joan Sebastian – "Más Allá Del Sol" (Joan Sebastian); Ana Gabriel – "Sin Tu Amor" (Ana Gabriel)	
2007	Freddie Martinez	"A Las Escondidas"	Joe Lopez and Jimmy González y Grupo Mazz	Edgar Cortazar and Mark Portmann – "¿Cómo Quieres Que Te Olvide?" (Pedro Fernández); Carlos Alberto Agundiz – "Él No Eres Tú" (Los Horóscopos de Durango); Teodoro Bello – "La Tragedia del Vaquero" (Vicente Fernández); Edgar Cortazar, Adrián Pieragostino and José Luis Terrazas – "Me Duele Escuchar Tu Nombre" (Grupo Montéz de Durango); Mauricio L. Arriaga and Eduardo Murguia – "Por Amarte" (Pepe Aguilar); Luis "Louie" Padilla – "Por Ella (Poco a Poco)" (Intocable)	.
2008	Joan Sebastian	"Estos Celos"	Vicente Fernández	Freddie Martínez – "Búscame En El Cielo" (Jimmy González y Grupo Mazz); Charlie Corona and Jesse Turner – "Decirte Te Quiero" (Siggno); Adolfo Angel – "Si Tú Te Vas" (Los Temerarios)	
2009	Marco Antonio Solís	"No Molestar"	Marco Antonio Solís	Santa Benith and Ediregia – "Almas Gemelas" (El Trono de México); Espinoza Paz – "Espero" (Grupo Montéz de Durango); Los Tucanes de Tijuana – "Se Fue Mi Amor" (Mario Quintero Lara); Joan Sebastian – "Voy A Conquistarte" (Diego Verdaguer)	
2010	Yoel Henriquez & Paco Lugo	"Amarte a La Antigua"	Pedro Fernández	Freddie Martinez – "Atrapada En Un Amor" (Elida Reyna y Avante); Pepe Aguilar – "Chaparrita" (Pepe Aguilar); Joan Sebastian – "Estuve" (Alejandro Fernández); Josué Contreras and Johnny Lee Rosas – "No Puedo Volver" (Intocable)	
2011	Marco Antonio Solís	"Tú Me Vuelves Loco"	Marco Antonio Solís	Marco Antonio Solís – "¿A Dónde Vamos a Parar?" (Marco Antonio Solís); Mario Quintero Lara – "El Jefe de la Sierra" (Los Tucanes de Tijuana); Joan Sebastián – "El Padrino" (Joan Sebastián); Joan Sebastián – "Huevos Rancheros" (Joan Sebastián)	
2012	Luis Carlos Monroy & Adrián Pieragostino	"El Mejor Perfume"	La Original Banda El Limón De Salvador Lizárraga	Ismael Gallegos and Alberto Jimenez Maeda – "Ay Mi Mexico" (Mariachi Divas de Cindy Shea); Charlie Corona and Jesse Turner – "Como Me Acuerdo De Ti" (Siggno); Luis Carlos Monroy and Adrian Pieragostino – "El Dia Que Me Fui" (Shaila Durcal); Manuel Eduardo Toscano – "Vivo Contenta" (Paquita la del Barrio)	
2013	Pedro Fernández	"Cachito De Cielo"	Pedro Fernández	Horacio Palencia – "Mi Razón De Ser" (Banda Sinaloense Ms De Sergio Lizárraga); Manuel Eduardo Toscano – "Romeo Y Su Nieta" (Paquita la del Barrio); Luis Carlos Monroy, Adrián Pieragostino, and Alex Rodríguez – "Todo y Nada" (Los Canarios De Michoacán); Adalberto Gallegos – "Tu Última Canción" (Jay Perez)	
2014	Marco Antonio Solís	"De Mil Amores"	Marco Antonio Solís	José Luis Roma – "Amor Amor" (Conjunto Primavera); Mario Alberto Zapata – "Cuando Estás De Buenas" (Pesado); Paulina Aguirre and Alberto Jiménez Maeda – "Mirando Hacia Arriba" (Mariachi Divas de Cindy Shea); Afid Ferrer – "Tonto Corazón" (Siggno)	
2015	Mauricio Arriaga, Edgar Barrera & Eduardo Murguía	"Todo Tuyo"	Banda El Recodo De Cruz Lizárraga	Julio Bahumea – "El Amor De Su Vida" (Julión Álvarez y Su Norteño Banda); José Alberto Inzunza and Luciano Luna – "Me Sobrabas Tú" (Banda Los Recoditos); Raúl Jiménez E. and Chucho Rincón – "Para Que Nunca Llores" (Diego Verdaguer); Espinoza Paz, – "Perdí La Pose" (Espinoza Paz)	
2016	Erika Ender, Manu Moreno & Mónica Vélez	"Ataúd"	Los Tigres Del Norte	Javier Manriquez – "Amor De Los Pobres" (La Original Banda El Limón De Salvador Lizáarraga); Salvador Aponte, Dany Pérez, and César Valdivia – "Me Está Gustando" (Banda Los Recoditos); Espinoza Paz – "Te Dirán" (La Adicitva Banda San José De Mesillas); Joan Sebastian – "Volví Pa'l Pueblo" (Joan Sebastian)	
2017	Juan Treviño	"Siempre Es Así"	Juan Treviño feat. AJ Castillo	Espinoza Paz - "Compromiso Descartado" (Leonardo Aguilar); Horacio Palencia - "Ganas De Volver" (Horacio Palencia); Raúl Jiménez E. & Chucho Rincón - "Sentimiento Emborrachado" (Santiago Arroyo); Edgar Barrera, Martín Castro Ortega & Alfonso Lizárraga - "Vale La Pena" (Banda El Recodo De Cruz Lizárraga)	
2018	Christian Nodal	"Probablemente"	Christian Nodal	Domingo Leiva Delgado - "Arránquense Muchachos" (Pedro Fernández); Gabriel Flores & Yoel Henríquez - "Ayúdame A Olvidarte" (La Explosiva Banda De Maza); Edén Muñoz - "Corrido De Juanito" (Calibre 50); Salvador Hurtado - "El Sueño Americano" (La Energía Norteña)	
2019	Edgar Barrera, Gussy Lau & Christian Nodal	"No Te Contaron Mal"	Christian Nodal	José Luis Roma - "Alguien Mejor Que Yo" (Bronco); Shae Fiol, Camilo Lara & Mireya Ramos - "Besos de Mezcal" (Flor de Toloache); Edgar Barrera, José Esparza, Gussy Lau & Christian Nodal - "De los Besos Que Te Di" (Christian Nodal); Manuel Monterrosas - "Te Amaré" (Álex Fernández)	
2020	Natalia Lafourcade	"Mi Religión"	Natalia Lafourcade	Christian Nodal - "Ayayay!" (Christian Nodal); José Luis Roma - "Caballero" (Alejandro Fernández); Lupita Infante & Luciano Luna - "Dejaré" (Lupita Infante); Gabriel Flores, Wences Romo & Jesse Turner - "#Hashtag" (Siggno)	
2021	Edgar Barrera, René Humberto Lau Ibarra & Christian Nodal	"Aquí Abajo"	Christian Nodal	Pepe Portilla - "Cicatrices" (Nora González with Lupita Infante); Erika Vidrio - "40 y 21" (Beto Zapata); El David Aguilar & Mon Laferte - "Que Se Sepa Nuestro Amor" (Mon Laferte & Alejandro Fernández); Edgar Barrera, Camilo & Alfonso de Jesús Quezada Mancha - "Tuyo y Mío" – (Camilo & Los Dos Carnales)	
2022	Edgar Barrera, Carín León & Matisse	"Como lo Hice Yo"	Matisse & Carin León	Gussy Lau – "Ahi Donde Me Ven" (Ángela Aguilar); Edgar Barrera, Eduin Caz, Nathan Galante, Maluma & Horacio Palencia – "Cada Quien" (Grupo Firme and Maluma); Edén Muñoz – "Chale" (Edén Muñoz); Christina Aguilera, Rafael Arcaute, Jorge Luis Chacín, Kat Dahlia, Yoel Henríquez, Yasmil Marrufo & Federico Vindver – "Cuando Me Dé la Gana" (Christina Aguilera & Christian Nodal); Mireya & Roman Rojas – "Nunca te Voy a Olvidar" (Mireya featuring Flor de Toloache, Roman Rojas & Jorge Glem); Edgar Barrera, Edén Muñoz & Christian Nodal – "Vivo en el 6" (Christian Nodal)	
2023	Bad Bunny, Edgar Barrera, Andrés Jael Correa Rios & Mag	"Un x100to"	Grupo Frontera featuring Bad Bunny	Joss Favela – "Aclarando la Mente" (Joss Favela); Edgar Barrera & Camilo – "Alaska" (Camilo & Grupo Firme); Pedro Julian Tovar Oceguera – "Ella Baila Sola" (Eslabon Armado & Peso Pluma); Edgar Barrera, Kany García, Richi López & Christian Nodal – "La Siguiente" (Kany García featuring Christian Nodal)	
2024	Edgar Barrera & Kevyn Mauricio Cruz	"El Amor de Su Vida"	Grupo Frontera & Grupo Firme	Héctor Guerrero – "Aquí Mando Yo" (Los Tigres del Norte); Mango, Nabález, Chris Zadley & Nicole Zignago – "Canción Para Olvidarte" (Majo Aguilar); Edgar Barrera, Becky G, Kevyn Mauricio Cruz & Elena Rose – "Por el Contrario" (Becky G featuring Angela Aguilar & Leonardo Aguilar); Salvador Aponte & Yoel Henríquez – "Tienes Que Ser Tú" (La Energía Norteña)	
2025	Luciano Luna	"La Lotería"	Los Tigres del Norte	Edgar Barrera, Iván Gamez, Alex Hernández & Adelaido Solís – "Hecha Pa' Mí" (Grupo Frontera); Miguel Armenta, Edgar Barrera & Jesús Ortiz Paz – "Me Jalo" (Fuerza Regida & Grupo Frontera); Fernanda Diaz, Daniela García Rosso, Lupita Infante & Mauro Muñoz – "¿Seguimos o No?" (Lupita Infante); Edgar Barrera, Kevyn Mauricio Cruz Moreno, Carín León & Maluma – "Si Tú Me Vieras" (Carín León, Maluma); César Gonzales & Kakalo – "Tierra Trágame" (Kakalo & Carín León)	
2026	Edgar Barrera , Iván Gámez, Fabio Iván Gutiérrez Ramírez, Joshua Xavier Gutierrez, Luis Mexia & Adelaido "Payo" Solís III	"No Capea"	Xavi & Grupo Frontera	Edgar Barrera, Andrés Jael Correa Ríos & Karol G – "Ese Hombre Es Malo" (Karol G); Johnny Lee Rosas, Ricardo Javier Muñoz & Pablo Preciado Rojas – "Estamos Todos" (Intocable); Miguel Armenta, Edgar Barrera, Iván Gámez & Alex Hernández – "Ojitos Bellos" (Grupo Frontera); Edén Muñoz – "Osadía" (Edén Muñoz & Christian Castro)	

- ^{^[I]} Each year is linked to the article about the Latin Grammy Awards held that year.
- ^{^[II]} The performing artist is only listed but does not receive the award.
- ^{^[III]} Showing the name of the songwriter(s), the nominated song and in parentheses the performer's name(s).

== See also ==
- Latin Grammy Award for Song of the Year
- Lo Nuestro Award for Regional Mexican Song of the Year
