= Sunny Sauceda =

American Tejano musician (born 1977)

- Born: 1977 (age 48–49)
- Origin: San Antonio, Texas, U.S.
- Genres: Tejano; Texas country
- Occupations: Musician; singer
- Instrument: Accordion
- Website: https://sunnysauceda.net/

Sunny Sauceda (born 1977) is an American Tejano music and Texas country musician from San Antonio, Texas. Sauceda plays the accordion and sings. He has been nominated for four Grammy Awards, winning Best Tejano Album in 2005.

== Early life and career ==
Sauceda grew up in San Antonio, Texas, and began playing music at age five. He started out playing conjunto music before moving to the Tejano for which he became known. He attended Harlandale High School and decided to pursue a music career when he found out he "wasn't good at welding". In the 1990s, he came to regional prominence as the accordionist for Eddie Gonzalez y Grupo Vida. In 2000, he taught Emily Robison of the Dixie Chicks to play accordion before touring with Grupo Vida as the opening act for the Chicks' national Fly tour.

In February 2005, Sauceda won a Grammy Award for Best Tejano Album for his part in Polkas, Gritos y Acordeones with David Lee Garza and Joel Guzman. Shortly thereafter he signed with Tejas Records, and released a self-titled debut album in November 2005. He later started his own label, Solstice Records, in 2009. Between 2008 and 2011, he had three solo albums—Vagar Libremente, Radiación Musical, and Homenaje A Mi Padre—nominated for Grammy Awards.

== Personal life ==
Sauceda lives in San Marcos, Texas. He married his wife, Vickie, in 2002. They have two children.

== Discography ==
Year	Album title
2005	Polkas, Gritos y Acordeones (with David Lee Garza and Joel Guzman)
2005	Sunny
2007	Vagar Libremente
2008	Radiacion Musical
2010	Homenaje A Mi Padre
2011	Camaleon
2013	Implacable
2016	DFM(Dios, Familia, Musica)
2021	After Party
