= Jimmy González y Grupo Mazz =

American Tejano band

- Also known as: Jimmy González y el Grupo Mazz
- Genres: Tejano
- Years active: 1999–2018
- Label: Freddie Records
- Spinoff of: Mazz

Jimmy González y Grupo Mazz was an American Tejano band founded by vocalist and guitarist Jimmy González after the 1998 disbanding of Mazz, his preceding group which he co-founded. González signed a recording contract with Freddie Records in 1999.

González y Grupo Mazz won the Latin Grammy Award for Best Tejano Album in 2001, 2002, 2003, 2004, 2009, and 2014, and hold the record of most wins.

The group was disbanded after González died on June 6, 2018, from complications of diabetes, shortly after their last release, Porque Todavía Te Quiero, which was nominated for Best Tejano Album at the 19th Annual Latin Grammy Awards.

== Legacy ==
After Jimmy González's death, his son Mike González formed a new group, Mike González and the Iconiczz. In 2022 they debuted with Te Llevo En Mi Alma, from which three singles were also produced. In 2025 the Iconiczz signed with Freddie Records, the same record label with which Jimmy González y Grupo Mazz was signed. Mike González commented: "My hope is to produce and release an amazing album just like Jimmy G would do [...] I’ve been waiting to return to Freddie Records — the same studio where my father and I created so many unforgettable hits. Now, I’m here to continue what we started and build something lasting with The Iconiczz. The legacy continues." The group is currently working on their next album.

On September 6, 2025, the Jimmy G. Music Fest was held at the Los Fresnos Rodeo Grounds, celebrating the life, legacy, and music of Jimmy González. Performers included Mike González and the Iconiczz, The Delta Boyz, Rustic Rose, La Lexxion, Horizonte Norteño, Alicat Crash, with a guest appearance by Margarita, who was once a backup singer for Mazz, and for whom Jimmy González had produced a debut album.

== Members ==
- Jimmy González – lead vocals, guitar (1998–2018)
- Lee Michael González – drums, band leader (1998–2018)
- Adolfo García – drums (1998–2005)
- Juan "Johnny Rod" Rodriguez – keyboards (1998–2007)
- Carlos González – bass (2000–?)
- Frankie Caballero – accordion (2000–?)
- Joe B. – vocals (2000–?)
- Xavier Padilla – keyboards (2000–?)
- Rebecca Valadez – vocals (2001–2002)
- Albert Rock Flores – percussion (2002–?)
- Art Ramirez – electric guitar (2002–?)
- Jay Alaniz – bass (2005–2018)
- Cacy Savala – backing vocals (as of 2013)
- Chris Perales – keyboards (as of 2013)
- Joseph González – percussion (as of 2013)
- Roger Peña – accordion (as of 2013)
- J. R. Gomez – accordion
- Tommy González – saxophone
- Danny Ortiz – vocals

== Discography ==
All albums with Freddie Records

- Quién Iba a Pensar (2000)
- Siempre Humilde (2001)
- Si Me Faltas Tu (2002)
- Live en el Valle (2003)
- Para Mi Gente (2004)
- Mejor Que Nunca (2005)
- It's Christmazz (2006)
- Mazz Live Reunion: The Last Dance (2006) – with Joe López
- Incomparable (2007)
- Live at Fiesta Market Square (2007)
- The Legend Continues (2008)
- Eternamente (2009)
- Mi Vida Sin Tu Amor (2010)
- The Return of the Bad Boys 2011 (2011)
- Forever Mazz (2013)
- Iconic (2014)
- Que Cante el Mundo (2016)
- Porque Todavía Te Quiero (2018)

== Awards ==
Latin Grammy Awards
Year	Composition	Category	Result
2001	Quién Iba a Pensar	Best Tejano Album	Won
2002	Siempre Humilde	Best Tejano Album	Won
2002	"Ahora Que Hago Sin Ti"	Best Regional Mexican Song	Nominated
2003	Si Me Faltas Tu	Best Tejano Album	Won
2003	"Dame Un Minuto"	Best Regional Mexican Song	Nominated
2004	Live en el Valle	Best Tejano Album	Won
2005	Para Mi Gente	Best Tejano Album	Nominated
2006	Mejor Que Nunca	Best Tejano Album	Nominated
2007	Mazz Live Reunion	Best Tejano Album	Nominated
2008	Incomparable	Best Tejano Album	Nominated
2009	The Legend Continues	Best Tejano Album	Won
2014	Forever Mazz	Best Tejano Album	Won
2018	Porque Todavía Te Quiero	Best Tejano Album	Nominated

Grammy Awards
Year	Composition	Category	Result
2003	Si Me Faltas Tu	Best Tejano Album	Won

Lo Nuestro Awards
Year	Category	Result
2003	Best Tejano Performance	Nominated

Tejano Music Awards
Year	Composition	Category
2001	Quién Iba a Pensar	Album of the Year (Group)
2002	"Ahora Que Hago Sin Ti"	Song of the Year
2003	Si Me Faltas Tu	Album of the Year (Group)
2003	"Yo Te Voy a Amar"	Song of the Year
2003	"Ahora Que Hago Sin Ti"	Crossover Song of the Year
2004	Live en el Valle	Album of the Year (Group)
2004	"Te Llevo en Mi Alma"	Song of the Year
2005	Para Mi Gente	Album of the Year (Tejano)
2006	Mejor Que Nunca	Album of the Year (Tejano)
2006	"Corazón de Fierro"	Song of the Year
2008	"His House"	Crossover Song of the Year
2009	The Legend Continues	Album of the Year (Group)
2009	"Retrato Quebrado"	Song of the Year
2009	"Aunque Se Burlen de Mi"	Crossover Song of the Year
2010		Entertainer of the Year
