= ¿Qué Te Hice? =

Studio album by Joe López
- Released: January 25, 2005
- Genre: Tejano
- Language: Spanish
- Label: Freddie Records

Joe López chronology
A.B. Quintanilla Presents Joe López (2004)	¿Qué Te Hice? (2005)	Aquí Estaré (2005)

¿Qué Te Hice? (English: What Did I Do To You?) is a studio album by Joe López released January 25, 2005.

== Production ==
¿Qué Te Hice? is López's first album with Freddie Records. At a December 7, 2004 conference he stated, "I want to be closer to the studios so I can be here day and night [...] I'm going to give 150 percent." He also told that he hoped to work with Freddie Records for a "thousand" years, but this was obstructed by his 2006 incarceration.

== Reception ==
The title track was also released to radio December 7, called "hot" and "one of the most requested songs" by KLHB Club 98.3 program director A.C. Cruz. During the week of January 24, 2005, it was #7 in K-99's Top 10 songs.

== Track listing ==
No.	Title	Writer(s)	Length
1.	"¿Qué Te Hice?"	Richard Rosales	3:11
2.	"Bianca Adriana"	Joe Revelez	3:10
3.	"Dios, Qué Iré Hacer"	Joe Revelez	3:09
4.	"Todo De Ti"	Freddie Martinez Sr.	3:17
5.	"Te Perdono"	Freddie Martinez Sr.	3:16
6.	"Todavía Pienso en Ti"	Richard Rosales	3:05
7.	"Se Me Lloran los Ojos"	Freddie Martinez Sr.	3:28
8.	"Si Pudiera Verte Una Vez Más"	Freddie Martinez Sr.	3:23
9.	"Tu Manera de Amar"	Humberto Ramón	3:03
10.	"No Estás Conmigo"	Joe Revelez	3:30
11.	"Hoy Vivo Muy Feliz"	Joe Revelez	3:33
12.	"Tú Tienes Que Vivir Conmigo"	Joe Mejia	2:54

=== Notes ===
- A music video was recorded for "¿Qué Te Hice?"
- "Tú Tienes Que Vivir Conmigo" was rerecorded for Mazz's 2006 reunion album Mazz Live Reunion: The Last Dance.
