= De Mil Amores =

Single by Marco Antonio Solís

from the album Gracias Por Estar Aquí
- Released: 2014
- Length: 3:03
- Label: Habari Inc
- Songwriter: Marco Antonio Solís

Marco Antonio Solís singles chronology
"Tres Semanas" (2013)	"De Mil Amores" (2014)	"Lo Mejor Para los Dos" (2014)

"De Mil Amores" (Of a Thousand Loves) is the second single of the album Gracias Por Estar Aquí. The song was written and performed by Mexican singer-songwriter Marco Antonio Solís. The song won a Latin Grammy Award for Best Regional Mexican Song at the Latin Grammy Awards of 2014.

== Chart performance ==
Chart (2013)	Peak position
US Hot Latin Songs (Billboard)	39
US Latin Airplay (Billboard)	33
US Regional Mexican Airplay (Billboard)	23
