= En Total Plenitud =

Studio album by Marco Antonio Solís
- Released: October 12, 2010
- Recorded: 2010
- Genre: Latin pop
- Length: 35:45
- Label: Fonovisa
- Producer: Marco Antonio Solís

Marco Antonio Solís chronology
No Molestar (2008)	En Total Plenitud (2010)	Gracias Por Estar Aquí (2013)

Singles from En Total Plenitud
- 1. "A Dónde Vamos a Parar" Released: July 26, 2010; 2. "Tú Me Vuelves Loco" Released: October 11, 2010; 3. "Ya Nada Es Igual" Released: January 24, 2011; 4. "Él Nunca Te Olvida" Released: April 18, 2011

En Total Plenitud (Eng.: "In Total Fullness") is the ninth studio album by Marco Antonio Solís. It was released on October 12, 2010. This album became his tenth number-one set on the Billboard Top Latin Albums for Solís, the most for any artist on the chart. A Dónde Vamos a Parar was featured in the novela Teresa starring Angelique Boyer, Sebastian Rulli, Ana Brenda Contreras, and Aaron Diaz.

== Track listing ==
All songs written and composed by Marco Antonio Solís

No.	Title	Length
1.	"Hay de Amores a Amores"	3:52
2.	"De Regreso a Casa"	3:42
3.	"Deséame Suerte"	3:09
4.	"Cuantos Días Sin Ti"	3:07
5.	"A Dónde Vamos a Parar"	3:48
6.	"Ya Nada Es Igual"	3:10
7.	"Te Me Olvidaste"	3:56
8.	"Tú Me Vuelves Loco"	3:22
9.	"Para Vivir Sin Ti"	3:50
10.	"Él Nunca Te Olvida"	3:51

== Charts ==
=== Weekly charts ===
Chart (2010)	Peak position
US Billboard 200	38
US Top Latin Albums (Billboard)	1
US Latin Pop Albums (Billboard)	1

=== Year-end charts ===
Chart (2010)	Position
US Top Latin Albums (Billboard)	36
Chart (2011)	Position
US Top Latin Albums (Billboard)	19

== Sales and certifications ==
Region	Certification	Certified units/sales
Mexico (AMPROFON)	Gold	30,000^{^}
United States (RIAA)	Platinum (Latin)	100,000^{^}
^{^} Shipments figures based on certification alone.

== See also ==
- List of number-one Billboard Latin Albums from the 2010s
