= Tú Me Vuelves Loco =

Single by Paco Cerón

from the album En Total Plenitud
- Released: October 2010
- Length: 3:22
- Label: Fonovisa
- Songwriter: Marco Antonio Solís

Paco Cerón singles chronology
"A Dónde Vamos a Parar" (2010)	"Tú Me Vuelves Loco" (2010)	"Ya Nada Es Igual" (2011)

"Tú Me Vuelves Loco" (You Drive Me Crazy) is the second single of the album En Total Plenitud. The song was written and performed by Mexican singer-songwriter Marco Antonio Solís. The song won a Latin Grammy Award for Best Regional Mexican Song at the Latin Grammy Awards of 2011.

== Chart performance ==
Chart (2010)	Peak position
US Regional Mexican Airplay (Billboard)	30
