= A Dónde Vamos a Parar =

Single by Marco Antonio Solís

from the album En Total Plenitud
- Released: July 26, 2010
- Recorded: 2009–2010
- Studio: Capitol Studios; Conway Recording Studio; EastWest Recording Studios; The Cavern at I-58 Studios
- Length: 3:48
- Label: Fonovisa
- Songwriter: Marco Antonio Solís

Marco Antonio Solís singles chronology
"Si Me Puedo Quedar" (2009)	"A Dónde Vamos a Parar" (2010)	"Tú Me Vuelves Loco" (2010)

"A Dónde Vamos a Parar" (Where Are We Headed) is the first single of the album En Total Plenitud (2010). The song was written and performed by Mexican singer-songwriter Marco Antonio Solís. The song was nominated a Latin Grammy Award for Song of the Year in the Latin Grammy Awards of 2011.

== Chart performance ==
Chart (2010)	Peak position
Mexico (Monitor Latino)	1
US Hot Latin Songs (Billboard)	18
US Regional Mexican Airplay (Billboard)	13

== See also ==
- List of number-one songs of 2010 (Mexico)
