= Mazz Live Reunion: The Last Dance =

Live album by Joe López and Jimmy González y Grupo Mazz
- Released: February 27, 2007
- Recorded: October 13, 2006
- Venues: The New West, Dallas, Texas
- Genre: Tejano
- Length: 75:29
- Label: Freddie Records

Joe López chronology
Aquí Estaré (2006)	Mazz Live Reunion: The Last Dance (2007)

Jimmy González y Grupo Mazz chronology
It's Christmazz (2006)	Mazz Live Reunion: The Last Dance (2007)	Incomparable (2007)

Mazz Live Reunion: The Last Dance is a live album by Joe López and Jimmy González y Grupo Mazz recorded on October 13, 2006 at The New West in Dallas, Texas and released February 27, 2007 with Freddie Records.

== Production ==
The recorded performance was the last in López and González's first tour together since Mazz's 1998 disbanding. It was also literally their last performance together as later in 2006, López was convicted of sexual assault and imprisoned, and was released in 2018, only very shortly before González died.

The performance was also video recorded and thus was released on both CD and DVD, with the CD including four studio-recorded bonus tracks and the DVD a "behind the scenes" interview with López and González, a discography, and photo gallery.

== Track listing ==
No.	Title	Writer(s)	Length
1.	"Introduction"		0:42
2.	"Que Me Lleven Canciones"	Humberto Ramón	4:06
3.	"Calla"	Adolfo García; Jimmy González	3:13
4.	"¿Porque Dios Mio?"	Matias Peña	4:15
5.	"Amor con Amor"	Macias	4:41
6.	"Ayer y Hoy"	Bilma Marques; Luis Silva	4:08
7.	"¿Que Sera?"		3:38
8.	"La Diferencia"		3:35
9.	"Just My Imagination"		4:47
10.	"Vuelvo"	Ricky Vela	3:51
11.	"Borrare Tu Nombre"	Enrique Navarro	4:25
12.	"Estúpido Romántico"	Pete Astudillo; Vela	3:05
13.	"Cuántas Veces"	Ramón	3:42
14.	"Qué Esperabas"	Fernando Riba; Kika Campos	2:05
15.	"Laura"	Ramón	2:45
16.	"Acaso No Soy"	Astudillo	1:25
17.	"No Te Olvidaré"	Joe López	5:42
18.	"Marcame Tonto" (studio track)	Richard Rosales	3:59
19.	"Tú Tienes Que Vivir Conmigo" (studio track)	Joe Meija	3:22
20.	"A las Escondidas" (studio track)	Freddie Martinez	4:15
21.	"Todo Vas Aprender" (studio track)	Joe Revelez	3:48
Total length:			75:29

Notes

- "Tu Tienes Que Vivir Conmigo" first appeared in López's 2006 album ¿Qué Te Hice?, and "Marcame Tonto" and "Todo Vas Aprender" first appeared in his other 2006 album Aquí Estaré. All three songs are likely not completely new recordings but rather have López's vocal track from his earlier recordings adapted to a new instrumental track. "A las Escondidas", however, is a completely new recording.

== Awards ==
- Nominated for Best Tejano Album at the 8th Annual Latin Grammy Awards on November 8, 2007
