= Joe López =

American Tejano vocalist and songwriter

- Born: José Manuel López; August 28, 1950 (age 76); Brownsville, Texas, US
- Genres: Tejano
- Occupations: Vocalist; songwriter
- Instrument: Vocals
- Years active: 1970s–2006, 2018–present
- Labels: EMI Latin; Freddie Records; Monterrey Music
- Member of: Joe López y Grupo Mazz
- Formerly of: Joe López y la Nueva Imagen Mazz; Mazz
- Website: joelopezmazz.com

José Manuel López, known publicly as Joe López (born August 28, 1950), is an American Tejano vocalist and songwriter who co-founded the group Mazz with his friend Jimmy González in 1978. He was the lead vocalist for Mazz until 1998, when he left to form a new group and lead a solo career. In 2006, López was convicted of sexually assaulting his niece and his career was halted until 2018 when he was released from incarceration and formed a new group, Joe López y Grupo Mazz. López and his group continue to produce music.

== Post-Mazz ==
=== Solo at EMI Latin ===
López went on to form the group Joe López y la Nueva Imagen Mazz sometime between 1998 and 1999. One of their earliest performances was on January 9, 1999, at Villa Real Entertainment Center in McAllen, Texas, in which they played "Duele," "No Te Olvidare," "Estupido Romantico," and the original Mazz group's then-recent song "Cuantas Veces." On March 27, 2001, López released his first and only album with the group, Mazz Fuerte Que Nunca, on which they had worked for three years. It is currently unknown what became of La Nueva Imagen Mazz after this.

On June 10, 2003, López released A Mi Manera, a bolero album. On March 9, 2004 came A.B. Quintanilla III Presents Joe López, produced by Selena's brother. Many reviewers labeled it as "progressive."

=== Freddie Records ===
Joe López signed with Freddie Records after his contract with EMI Latin ended. With that label he released ¿Qué Te Hice? on January 25, 2005, and then planned for a second album, Aquí Estaré, released later that year sometime before November.

== Conviction and incarceration ==
López's arraignment was scheduled for October 19, but he did not appear. (His attorney Robert Lerma claimed that he was not evading arrest but rather spent much time traveling and had not received the notice.) Presiding judge Leonel Alejandro issued an arrest warrant, which was fulfilled November 7 when López surrendered at the 357th state District Court in Cameron County. He posted a $25,000 cash bond and then was booked at and released from Carrizales-Rucker Detention Center in Olmito.

On October 20, 2006, López was convicted of two counts of aggravated sexual assault of a child and one count of indecency with a child after his niece Krystal López testified that in April 2004, when she was 13 years old, he had raped her at his condominium in Rancho Viejo, Texas (which is about ten miles away from his hometown of Brownsville).

López's Mazz bandmate Jimmy González was not in town at the time.

In January 2017, the Texas Board of Pardons and Paroles voted to parole López after his having served 10 years. In preparation for the parole hearing, López's lawyer Bill Habern sent him for two polygraph exams, both of which he passed, and to sex therapist Dr. Shelley Graham, who found him to be "a very low risk threat." Krystal López, by then 26 years old and employed as a biotechnician, commented that his release was "basically like a slap in my face [...] Why would you give him 32 years and he serves 10?" She stated on January 25 that the board had failed their promise to notify her of plans to vote on López's parole and that they had denied her the opportunity to appeal against his release, but on February 2 she was allowed to do so. The board determined that López would complete a "nine-month Sex Offender Treatment Program" beginning May 1, 2017. After said program, López was granted parole January 26, 2018.

López was released March 15, 2018. He is required to register as a sex offender for life and can be found on the Texas Public Sex Offender Database.

== Joe López y Grupo Mazz ==
After his incarceration, López formed a new band, Joe López y Grupo Mazz, and signed with Mexican label Monterrey Music.

He began his "Freedom Tour" on December 13, 2019, at El Rodeo Disco in Houston, Texas, after the Texas Board of Pardons and Parole ruled to allow him into Harris County, the home of Krystal López. Andy Kahan of Crime Stoppers Houston, and a supporter of Krystal López, criticized the decision, stating that "To pick Harris County as your first choice when you could’ve gone anywhere in the state from our perspective sends a sinister and subliminal message." The Freedom Tour album was released May 29, 2020.

On May 20, 2022, López released his second album with Monterrey Music, Love From the Heart, from which the tracks "Igual Que Ayer" and "Llegaste Tú" were released as singles.

López was scheduled to win a Lifetime Achievement Award at the 43rd Tejano Music Awards on October 21, 2023, but that honor was rescinded on October 18 because of, according to the Awards' vice president Frank Salazar, public outcry (likely about López's conviction). López's performance was canceled and he did not attend the event. Jimmy González's son, James "Junebug," agreed with the decision, commenting that it was ''the right thing to do," as did many other Tejano artists and fans. López was still however eligible to win other awards for which he was nominated, including male vocalist of the year and Tejano album of the year for Love From the Heart.

Despite that controversy, López was set to receive a Lifetime Achievement award as the 5th annual Guadalupe Awards some weeks later.

On September 23, 2023, López released a reprisal of "Que Me Lleven Canciones" with Mexican band El Poder del Norte and its accordionist Arturo Buenrostro.

== Personal life ==
In 2004, López experienced a hip injury which paused his career for some weeks.

== Discography ==
Mazz

- See Mazz § Discography

Joe López y la Nueva Imagen Mazz

- Mazz Fuerte Que Nunca (EMI Latin, 2001)

Joe López

- A Mi Manera (EMI Latin, 2003)
- A.B. Quintanilla Presents Joe López (EMI Latin, 2004)
- ¿Qué Te Hice? (Freddie Records, 2005)
- Aquí Estaré (Freddie Records, 2005)
- Siempre Mazz: Preparense (Freddie Records, 2006) – compilation with Jimmy González y Grupo Mazz
- Mazz Live Reunion: The Last Dance (Freddie Records, 2006) – with Jimmy González y Grupo Mazz
- Una Vez Mazz (Freddie Records, 2008) – compilation with Jimmy González y Grupo Mazz
- Top Ten: The Very Best of Joe López y Grupo Mazz (Freddie Records, 2010) – compilation including live tracks performed with Jimmy González y Grupo Mazz

Joe López y Grupo Mazz

- Freedom Tour (Monterrey Music, 2020)
- Love From the Heart (Monterrey Music, 2022)

== Awards ==
For awards to Mazz as a group, see Mazz § Awards

Tejano Music Awards
Year	Category
1983	Male Vocalist of the Year
1986	Vocal Duo of the Year (with Jimmy González)
1988	Vocal Duo of the Year (with Jimmy González)
1989	Vocal Duo of the Year (with Jimmy González)
1990	Vocal Duo of the Year (with Jimmy González)
1990	Songwriter of the Year
1991	Male Vocalist of the Year
1991	Vocal Duo of the Year (with Jimmy González)
1991	Male Entertainer of the Year
1991	Songwriter of the Year
1992	Male Vocalist of the Year
1992	Vocal Duo of the Year (with Jimmy González)
1992	Male Entertainer of the Year
1992	Songwriter of the Year
1994	Vocal Duo of the Year (with Jimmy González)
2010	Decade Ballot Winner: Male Vocalist 1980s
