= 3rd Annual Latin Grammy Awards =

Music awards presented Sept 2002

3rd Latin Grammy Awards
- Official poster
- Date: September 18, 2002
- Venue: Kodak Theatre, Los Angeles, California
- Hosted by: Gloria Estefan and Jimmy Smits

Highlights
- Person of the Year: Vicente Fernández

Television/radio coverage
- Network: CBS

The 3rd Annual Latin Grammy Awards were held in Los Angeles at the Kodak Theatre on Wednesday, September 18, 2002. Alejandro Sanz was the night's big winner, winning a total of three awards including Album of the Year. The ceremony returned in style after the 2001 ceremony was cancelled because of the September 11, 2001 terrorist attacks across America.

== Presenters & performers ==
- Marc Anthony
- Bossacucanova & Roberto Menescal
- Cabas
- Nick Carter
- Celia Cruz
- Hector Elizondo
- Alejandro Fernandez
- Vicente Fernandez
- Daisy Fuentes
- Nelly Furtado
- Jennifer Love Hewitt
- Juanes
- La Ley
- Ali Landry
- Ivan Lins
- George Lopez
- Cheech Marin
- Alex Meneses
- Esai Morales
- Enrique Murciano
- Jacqueline Obradors
- P.O.D.
- Laura Pausini
- Leah Remini
- Freddy Rodriguez
- Paul Rodriguez
- Roselyn Sanchez
- Santana
- Alejandro Sanz
- Jon Secada
- Shakira
- Thalia
- Justin Timberlake
- Wilmer Valderrama
- Carlos Vives

== Awards ==
Winners are in bold text.

=== General ===
Record of the Year

Alejandro Sanz — "Y Sólo Se Me Ocurre Amarte"

- Celia Cruz — "La Negra Tiene Tumbao"
- La Ley — "Mentira"
- Gian Marco — "Se Me Olvidó"
- Carlos Vives — "Déjame Entrar"

Album of the Year

Alejandro Sanz — MTV Unplugged

- Miguel Bosé — Sereno
- Celia Cruz — La Negra Tiene Tumbao
- Ivan Lins — Jobiniando
- Carlos Vives — Déjame Entrar

Song of the Year

Alejandro Sanz — "Y Sólo Se Me Ocurre Amarte"

- Juanes — "A Dios le Pido"
- Andres Castro, Martín Madera and Carlos Vives — "Déjame Entrar" (Carlos Vives)
- Sergio George and Fernando Osorio — "La Negra Tiene Tumbao" (Celia Cruz)
- Miguel Bosé, Lanfranco Ferrario and Massimo Grilli — "Morenamia" (Miguel Bosé)

Best New Artist

Jorge Moreno

- Cabas
- Circo
- Gian Marco
- Sin Bandera

=== Pop ===
Best Female Pop Vocal Album

Rosario — Muchas Flores

- Ana Belén — Peces de Ciudad
- Cecilia Echenique — Secreta Intimidad
- Mónica Molina — Vuela
- Nicole — Viaje infinito

Best Male Pop Vocal Album

Miguel Bosé — Sereno

- Jorge Drexler — Sea
- Alejandro Lerner — Lerner Vivo
- Gian Marco — A Tiempo
- Marco Antonio Solís — Más de Mi Alma

Best Pop Album by a Duo/Group with Vocals

Sin Bandera — Sin Bandera

- Amaral — Estrella de mar
- Mamma Soul — Fe
- Presuntos Implicados — Gente
- Supernova — Retráctate

Best Pop Instrumental Album

Chucho Valdés — Canciones Inéditas

- Gustavo Cerati — +Bien
- Rey Guerra — De Sindo A Silvio
- José Padilla — Navigator
- Roberto Perera — Sensual

=== Rap/Hip-Hop ===
Best Rap/Hip-Hop Album

Vico C — Vivo

- Camorra — Vírus
- Nilo MC — Guajiro Del Asfalto
- Nocaute — CD Pirata
- X-Alfonso — X - Moré

=== Rock ===
Best Rock Solo Vocal Album

Alejandra Guzmán — Soy

- Celeste Carballo — Celeste Acústica
- León Gieco — Bandidos Rurales
- Miguel Ríos — Miguel Ríos y las estrellas del rock latino
- Luis Alberto Spinetta — Silver Sorgo

Best Rock Album by a Duo/Group with Vocals

La Ley — MTV Unplugged

- Babasónicos — Jessico
- Circo — No Todo Lo Que Es Pop Es Bueno
- Elefante — El Que Busca Encuentra
- Kinky — Kinky

Best Rock Song

Juanes — "A Dios le Pido"

- Reyli Barba and Rafael López — "Así Es La Vida" (Elefante)
- Luis Alberto Spinetta — "El Enemigo"
- León Gieco and Luis Gurevich — "Idolo De Los Quemados" (León Gieco)
- Beto Cuevas — "Mentira" (La Ley)

=== Tropical ===
Best Salsa Album

Celia Cruz — La Negra Tiene Tumbao

- Marc Anthony — Libre
- El Gran Combo de Puerto Rico — Nuevo Milenio~El Mismo Sabor
- Giro — Mi Nostalgia
- Tito Rojas — Quiero Llegar A Casa

Best Merengue Album

Olga Tañón — Yo Por Ti

- Eddy Herrera — Atrevido
- Los Toros Band — Pa' La Calle
- Kinito Méndez — A Palo Limpio
- Fernando Villalona — Mal Acostumbrado

Best Contemporary Tropical Album

Carlos Vives — Déjame Entrar

- Felix D'Oleo — Frutos
- Celso Piña — Barrio Bravo
- Síntesis — Habana A Flor De Piel
- Vocal Sampling — Cambio De Tiempo

Best Traditional Tropical Album

Bebo Valdés Trio with Israel López "Cachao" and Carlos "Patato" Valdés — El Arte del Sabor

- Nelson González — Pa' Los Treseros
- Totó la Momposina — Pacantó
- Various Artists — Cuban Masters - Los Originales
- Charlie Zaa — De Un Solo Sentimiento

Best Tropical Song

Andrés Castro, Martín Madera and Carlos Vives — "Déjame Entrar" (Carlos Vives)

- Gustavo Arenas and Jorge Luis Piloto — "Como Olvidar" (Olga Tañón)
- Jandy Feliz — "La Pasión"
- Julio Castro — "Me Liberé" (El Gran Combo de Puerto Rico)
- Omar Alfanno — "Pueden Decir" (Gilberto Santa Rosa)

=== Regional Mexican ===
Best Ranchero Album

Vicente Fernández — Más Con El Número Uno

- Pepe Aguilar — Lo Mejor De Nosotros
- Ana Bárbara — Te Regalo La Lluvia
- Aida Cuevas — Enhorabuena
- Alejandro Fernández — Orígenes

Best Banda Album

Cuisillos de Arturo Macias — Puras Rancheras Con Cuisillos

- Banda Machos — A Prueba De Balas
- Banda Pachuco — Quedate Conmigo
- Jenni Rivera — Se las Voy a Dar a Otro
- Thalía — Thalía con banda: Grandes éxitos

Best Grupero Album

Joan Sebastian — Lo Dijo El Corazon

- Grupo Bryndis — En El Idioma Del Amor
- Guardianes Del Amor — Muriendo De Frio
- Los Mismos — Perdón Por Extrañarte
- Priscila & Sus Balas De Plata — Para Mi Amor

Best Tejano Album

Jimmy González y Grupo Mazz — Siempre Humilde

- David Lee Garza & Los Musicales — Estamos Unidos
- Ram Herrera — Ingrata
- La Mafia — Inconfundible
- Los Desperadoz — Desde El Corazón

Best Norteño Album

Ramón Ayala y Sus Bravos del Norte — El Número Cien

- Atrapado — Muevete Muevete Mas
- Intocable — Sueños
- Los Huracanes del Norte — Mensaje De Oro
- Los Palominos — Un Poco Más

Best Regional Mexican Song

Freddie Martínez — "Del Otro Lado Del Porton" (Ramón Ayala y Sus Bravos del Norte)

- Jimmy González — "Ahora Que Hago Sin Ti" (Jimmy González y Grupo Mazz)
- Joan Sebastian — "Apuesto" (Pepe Aguilar)
- Joan Sebastian — "Manantial De Llanto"
- Sylvia Ivañez and Bebu Silvetti — "Siempre Te Amaré" (Aida Cuevas)

=== Traditional ===
Best Folk Album

Susana Baca — Lamento Negro

- Berrogüetto — Hepta
- Kepa Junkera — Maren
- Petrona Martínez — Bonito Que Canta
- Lázaro Ros — Orisha Ayé. Shangó

Best Tango Album

Sérgio & Odair Assad — Sérgio & Odair Assad Play Piazzolla

- Adrián Iaies — Tango Reflections
- Raul Jaurena — Tango Bar
- Néstor Marconi — Sobre Imágenes
- Julia Zenko — Tango Por Vos

Best Flamenco Album

Antonio Núñez — Mis 70 Años Con El Cante

- Remedios Amaya — Sonsonete
- Arcángel — Arcángel
- Diego El Cigala — Corren Tiempos De Alegría
- Martirio — Mucho Corazón

=== Jazz ===
Best Latin Jazz Album

Gonzalo Rubalcaba Trio — Supernova

- Richie Beirach, Gregor Huebner and George Mraz — Round About Federico Mompou
- William Cepeda — Expandiendo Raices/Branching Out
- Charlie Haden — Nocturne
- Omar Sosa — Sentir

=== Christian ===
Best Christian Album

Padre Marcelo Rossi — Paz - Ao Vivo

- Ileana Garcés — El Amor Tiene Un Valor
- Roberto Orellana — Mi Nuevo Amor
- Rabito — Viva La Vida
- 33 DC — Ven, Es Tiempo de Adorarle

=== Brazilian ===
Best Brazilian Contemporary Pop Album

Lenine — Falange Canibal

- Bossacucanova and Roberto Menescal — Brasilidade
- Zélia Duncan — Sortimento
- Otto — Condom Black
- Ivete Sangalo — Festa

Best Brazilian Rock Album

Cássia Eller — Acústico MTV

- Arnaldo Antunes — Paradeiro
- CPM 22 — CPM 22
- Roberto Frejat — Amor Pra Recomeçar
- Los Hermanos — Bloco do Eu Sozinho

Best Samba/Pagode Album

Zeca Pagodinho — Deixa a Vida Me Levar

- Martinho da Vila — Da Roca e da Cidade
- Claudio Jorge — Coisa de Chefe
- Riachão — Humanenochum
- Nelson Sargento — Flores em Vida

Best MPB Album

Chico Buarque and Edu Lobo — Cambaio

- Dori Caymmi — Influencias
- Celso Fonseca and Ronaldo Bastos — Juventude/Slow Motion Bossa Nova
- Guinga — Cine Baronesa
- Ed Motta — Dwitza

Best Sertaneja Music Album

Bruno & Marrone — Acústico – Ao Vivo

- Zezé di Camargo & Luciano — Zezé di Camargo e Luciano
- Marlon & Maicon — Marlon e Maicon
- Rio Negro and Solimões — So Alegria
- Trio Parada Dura — Brilhante

Best Brazilian Roots/Regional Album

Gilberto Gil — São João Vivo

- As Galvão — Nois e a Viola
- Caju & Castanha — Andando de Coletivo
- Heraldo do Monte — Viola Nordestina
- Dominguinhos — Lembrando Voce

Best Brazilian Song

Dori Caymmi and Paulo César Pinheiro — "Saudade de Amar" (Nana Caymmi)

- Celso Fonseca and Ronaldo Bastos — "A Voz do Coração"
- Arnaldo Antunes and Pepeu Gomes — "Alma" (Zélia Duncan)
- Eri do Cais and Serginho Meriti — "Deixa a Vida Me Levar" (Zeca Pagodinho)
- Riachão — "Va Morar com o Diabo" (Cássia Eller)

=== Children's ===
Best Latin Children's Album

Xuxa — Só Para Baixinhos 2

- Belinda — Cómplices al Rescate
- Chiquititas — Chiquititas Vol. 7
- Melody — De Pata Negra
- Miliki — Navidades Animadas

=== Classical ===
Best Classical Album

Quarteto Amazonia — Adiós Nonino - Quarteto Amazônia Toca Astor Piazzolla

- Pablo Roberto Diemecke and Jorge Federico Osorio — Chávez: Conciertos Para Violin y Piano
- María Guinand — Golijov: La Pasión Según San Marcos
- Luiz De Moura Castro and María José Montiel — Modinha - Brazilian Songs
- Cuarteto Latinoamericano — Villa-Lobos: String Quartets, Vol. 6

=== Production ===
Best Engineered Album

Andrés Bermúdez, Joel Numa and Silvio Richetto — Alexandre Pires (Alexandre Pires)

- Jon Fausty — Cambio De Tiempo (Vocal Sampling)
- Jorge "Mosquito" Garrido, Facundo Rodríguez, Ricardo Troilo and Alvaro Villagra — Lerner Vivo (Alejandro Lerner)
- Moogie Canazio — Sandy & Junior (Sandy & Junior)
- Gerónimo Labrada, Jr. and X-Alfonso — X-Moré (X-Alfonso)

Producer of the Year

Kike Santander

- Humberto Gatica
- Sebastian Krys
- Gerónimo Labrada, Jr. and X-Alfonso
- Ana Lourdes Martínez Nodarse

=== Music video ===
Best Music Video

Shakira — "Suerte"

- Celia Cruz — "La Negra Tiene Tumbao"
- Juanes — "A Dios le Pido"
- Paulina Rubio — "Yo No Soy Esa Mujer"
- Carlos Vives — "Déjame Entrar"
