= Rebecca Valadez =

American vocalist and actress

- Genres: Tejano
- Instrument: Vocals
- Labels: AMI Records Latin
- Formerly of: Mazz, Jimmy González y Grupo Mazz

Rebecca Valadez is an American vocalist, actress, and former member of the Tejano groups Mazz and Jimmy González y Grupo Mazz. She performed on the latter group's 2002 Latin Grammy Award-winning album, Siempre Humilde. Her solo album Rebecca Valadez (2005) under AMI Records Latin was nominated for "Best Tejano Album" at the 2006 Grammy Awards. Valadez was a backup singer in Janet Jackson's 1998–99 Velvet Rope Tour and played the lead role in matinée performances of the 2000 musical Selena Forever.

== Discography ==
- Rebecca Valadez (AMI Records, 2005)
- "My Christmas Wish" (AV Records, 2019) – single
- "That's All I've Got to Say" (self-published, 2022) – single with Ram Herrera
- "No Te Voy a Perder" (Versatus Productions, 2022) – single
- "Joy of Christmas" (Shellshock Records, 2024) – single
