= David Lee Garza =

American Tejano musician and bandleader (born 1957)

- Born: February 15, 1957 (age 69); Poteet, Texas, US
- Genres: Tejano
- Instrument: Accordion
- Member of: David Lee Garza y los Musicales
- Website: davidleegarzaylosmusicales.net

David Lee Garza (born February 15, 1957) is an American Tejano musician and bandleader. Garza was born and raised in Poteet, Texas.

Garza and his band have been responsible for jumpstarting the careers of numerous Tejano vocalists by way of collaboration, including Ramiro “Ram” Herrera, Emilio Navaira, Oscar G., Jay Perez, Marcos Orozco, Mark Ledesma, and Ben Ozuna. The current vocalist for the group is Cezar Martinez.

Garza's album Just Friends won the 2013 Latin Grammy for Best Tejano Album.

In March 2022, Garza announced a collaboration with Tejano guitarist Chris Pérez. The two shared images from the recording studio, teasing the upcoming release.

Garza's song "No Me Queda Claro", a collaboration with Pio Treviño y Majic, was nominated for the Collaboration of the Year Award at the 2025 Tejano Music Awards.

On March 30, 2026, Garza's son, David Lee Garza Jr., died unexpectedly at the age of 44.

== Discography ==
=== Albums ===
- Cuatro Caminos (with Los Musicales) (1981)
1. Diosito Me La Mando (Honorio Herrero, Luis Gómez-Escolar)
2. Ay Que Sentimiento Traigo (Honorio Herrero, Luis Gómez-Escolar)
3. Polvo En El Viento (Dust in the Wind) (Kerry Livgren, Luis Gómez-Escolar)
4. Popurrí Maríachi (Cornelio Reyna, Joe Mejía, Joaquina Ridings)
5. Pero Ay Que Triste (Honorio Herrero, Luis Gómez-Escolar)
6. La Llama Del Amor (Julio Seijas, Francisco Dondiego)
7. Cuatro Caminos (Honorio Herrero, Luis Gómez-Escolar)
8. Se Me Va De Las Manos (Julio Seijas, Luis Gómez-Escolar)
9. Los Caballitos (Julio Seijas, Luis Gómez-Escolar, Amado Jaén)
10. Amor A Trocitos (Lolita de la Colina)
11. Born To Lose (Julio Seijas, Honorio Herrero, Luis Gómez-Escolar)
12. My Heart Belongs To You (Honorio Herrero, Luis Gómez-Escolar)
- Todavía No Me Muero (with Los Musicales) (1982)
1. Amando En Silencio (Honorio Herrero, Luis Gómez-Escolar)
2. Necesito Tu Amor (Honorio Herrero, Luis Gómez-Escolar)
3. No Puedo Sonríe Sin Ti (Can't Smile Without You) (Chris Arnold, Geoff Morrow, David Martín, Luis Gómez-Escolar)
4. Tú y Las Nubes (José Alfredo Jiménez)
5. Mujer De La Calle (Honorio Herrero, Luis Gómez-Escolar)
6. La De Los Ojitos Negros (Honorio Herrero, Luis Gómez-Escolar)
7. Voy Perdiendo (Julio Seijas, Luis Gómez-Escolar)
8. Todavía No Me Muero (Julio Seijas, Francisco Dondiego)
9. Anhelo (Lolita de la Colina)
10. No Tengo Corazón (Julio Seijas, Luis Gómez-Escolar, David Lee Garza)
11. Con Tus Desprecios (Julio Seijas, Honorio Herrero, Luis Gómez-Escolar)
12. Un Viejo Querer (Honorio Herrero, Luis Gómez-Escolar)
- Especialmente Para Ti (with Los Musicales) (1983)
1. Especialmente Para Ti (Honorio Herrero, Luis Gómez-Escolar)
2. No Te Hagas Para Atrás (Honorio Herrero, Luis Gómez-Escolar)
3. A Flor De Piel (Julio Iglesias, Rafael Ferro)
4. Yo Vivo Mí Vida (Julio Seijas, Francisco Dondiego)
5. Cuando Me Vaya De Aquí (Honorio Herrero, Luis Gómez-Escolar)
6. Tormenta Tras Tormenta (Julio Seijas, Luis Gómez-Escolar)
7. El Tejano Enamorado (Ramón Farrán Sánchez)
8. De Pena Muero (Lolita de la Colina)
9. Emma's Polka (Honorio Herrero, Luis Gómez-Escolar)
10. Mentiras, Mentiras, Mentiras (Honorio Herrero, Luis Gómez-Escolar)
11. Tu Nuevo Querer (Julio Seijas, Honorio Herrero, Luis Gómez-Escolar)
12. Just One Time (Honorio Herrero, Luis Gómez-Escolar)
- Las Canciones Que Te Cantó (with Los Musicales) (1984)
1. Un Tropiezo (Honorio Herrero, Luis Gómez-Escolar)
2. Por Confiar En Tú Cariño (Honorio Herrero, Luis Gómez-Escolar)
3. Es Difícil Decir Lo Siento (Hard to Say I'm Sorry) (Peter Cetera, Luis Gómez-Escolar)
4. Perfidia (Alberto Domínguez)
5. Ya Me Lo Contaron (Honorio Herrero, Luis Gómez-Escolar)
6. El Arbolito (Julio Seijas, Luis Gómez-Escolar)
7. Por Bien De Los Dos (Julio Seijas, Luis Gómez-Escolar, David Lee Garza)
8. Las Canciones Que Te Cantó (Julio Seijas, Honorio Herrero, Luis Gómez-Escolar)
9. Ya No Te Acuerdes (Julio Seijas, Francisco Dondiego)
10. Que Voy Hacer (Lolita de la Colina)
11. A Mí Pobre Corazón (Honorio Herrero, Luis Gómez-Escolar)
12. Tres Días Sin Verte (Honorio Herrero, Luis Gómez-Escolar)
- The Award Winning (with Los Musicales) (1984)
1. Corazón (Honorio Herrero, Luis Gómez-Escolar)
2. Angel Baby (Honorio Herrero, Luis Gómez-Escolar)
3. Palabras (Words) (Robert Fitoussi, Luis Gómez-Escolar)
4. Sin Ti (Pepe Guízar)
5. Te Vi Por Primera Vez (Julio Seijas, Luis Gómez-Escolar)
6. Porque Eres Mía (Honorio Herrero, Luis Gómez-Escolar)
7. Pregúntale A Quien Tú Quieras (Julio Seijas, Francisco Dondiego)
8. Para Que Mentir (Honorio Herrero, Luis Gómez-Escolar)
9. Cuando Escuches Este Vals (Julio Seijas, Honorio Herrero, Luis Gómez-Escolar)
10. Sonámbulo (Ramón Farrán Sánchez)
11. La Palmera (Lolita de la Colina)
12. Te Vas (Honorio Herrero, Luis Gómez-Escolar)
- Totally Yours "Bullet-Proff" (with Los Musicales) (1985)
1. Ya Verás (Honorio Herrero, Luis Gómez-Escolar)
2. La Bamba (Traditional, Julio Seijas, Luis Gómez-Escolar)
3. Todo Es Imposible (Maniac) (Dennis Matkosky, Michael Sembello, Luis Gómez-Escolar)
4. Amapola (Joseph LaCalle)
5. Que Piensas (Pau Piqué)
6. Pégame Tres Balazos (Honorio Herrero, Luis Gómez-Escolar)
7. Tú Me Dabas (Honorio Herrero, Luis Gómez-Escolar)
8. Te Vas, Te Vas (Julio Seijas, Francisco Dondiego)
9. Dios Te Puso En Mí Camino (Julio Seijas, Honorio Herrero, Luis Gómez-Escolar)
10. Te Quiero Tanto (Lolita de la Colina)
11. Avísame (Honorio Herrero, Luis Gómez-Escolar)
12. Hazlo Conmigo (Honorio Herrero, Luis Gómez-Escolar)
- Cuantas Veces (with Los Musicales) (1986)
1. Cuantas Veces (Honorio Herrero, Luis Gómez-Escolar)
2. Dame El Derecho (Julio Seijas, Francisco Dondiego)
3. Sí Es Que Tu Me Recuerdas (Like a Fool) (Barry Gibb, Luis Gómez-Escolar, Maurice Gibb, Robin Gibb)
4. Contigo en la Distancia (Cesar Portillo de la Luz)
5. Sí Un Día Me Faltaras (Honorio Herrero, Luis Gómez-Escolar)
6. Ven Por Mí Amor (Honorio Herrero, Luis Gómez-Escolar)
7. A La Luz De La Luna (Honorio Herrero, Luis Gómez-Escolar)
8. De Nuevo Otra Vez (Julio Seijas, Luis Gómez-Escolar, David Lee Garza)
9. Tu Amor Se Me Va (Julio Seijas, Honorio Herrero, Luis Gómez-Escolar)
10. Otra En Mí Lugar (Lolita de la Colina)
11. Y No Hay Nadie (Honorio Herrero, Luis Gómez-Escolar)
12. Popurrí Poteet (Traditional, Julio Seijas, Luis Gómez-Escolar)
- Dejame Conocerte (with Los Musicales)
1. Hoy Que Ya Estamos Aquí (Juan Carlos Calderón)
2. La Que Se Quede (Juan Carlos Calderón)
3. Devuelveme El Corazón (José María Cano)
4. Pobrecita (Nacho Cano)
5. Esperare Por Un Heroe (Holding Out for a Hero) (Jim Steinman, Dean Pitchford, Juan Carlos Calderón)
6. Popurrí José Alfredo Jiménez (José Alfredo Jiménez)
7. Que Mala Sangre Tienes (Juan Carlos Calderón)
8. Dos Corazónes (Juan Carlos Calderón)
9. Al Pie De Tú Balcón (Nacho Cano)
10. Siempre Vivirás En Mí (José María Cano)
11. Dejame Conocerte (Juan Carlos Calderón)
12. Amor Seguro (Juan Carlos Calderón)
