= Chente Barrera =

American musician

- Born: Vicente Barrera; San Antonio, Texas, US
- Genre: Tejano
- Occupation: Musician
- Labels: Capitol/EMI Latin; Q-Vo; Arimo; VMB Music Group
- Website: chentebarrera.com

Vicente Barrera, better known as Chente Barrera, is a Tejano musician from San Antonio, Texas. He and his band Taconazo won the 2007 Grammy Award in the Best Tejano Album category and a Latin Grammy nomination for their album Sigue El Taconazo.

== Discography ==
=== Studio albums ===
- Puro Taconazo (Capitol/EMI Latin, 1998)
- Mi Inspiración (Animo Records, 2002)
- Pedazo De Mi Corazón (Q-Vo Records, 2004)
- Sigue El Taconazo (Q-Vo, 2006)
- Music Lessons (Q-Vo, 2008)
- El No. 7 (Q-Vo, 2011)
- ¡Viva Tejano! (Q-Vo, 2015)
- Un Nuevo Amor (VMB Music Group, 2015)
- Para El Primo: A Tribute to Roberto Pulido y Los Clasicos
- 25th Anniversary

=== Compilations ===
- Ten Years (Q-Vo, 2008)
