= Los Palominos =

Tejano group from Uvalde, Texas

Los Palominos are a Tejano group from Uvalde, Texas.

== History ==
Los Palominos were formed in 1986 by four brothers under the name Los Tremendos Pequeños. Their repertoire includes polka, rancheras, boleros, ballads, and cumbias. They signed with Sony Discos in 1992 after meeting with Armando Lichtenberger and Oscar de la Rosa of La Mafia. Their 1994 release Corazon de Cristal was a hit in the United States and Mexico, and they have released a steady stream of hit records well into the 2000s.

In 2000 the group changed to Fonovisa Records followed by a change to Urbana Records in 2003.

In early 2016, the group signed a new deal with M Music & Entertainment Group, a subsidiary of Latin indie powerhouse Freddie Records, and released their first new album under the label titled Piénsalo. The album debuted at #1 on the iTunes Latin Albums chart.

== Members ==
=== Current members ===
- James Arreola - bajo sexto, vocals
- Jorge Arreola - bass
- Julio Arreola - accordion, vocals
- Daniel Martínez - drums

=== Past members ===
- Jesse Arreola - drums (died on February 4, 2001, in Port Lavaca, TX. Jesse was in a tour bus accident.)
- Johnny Arreola - accordion, vocals

== Discography ==
- Flashback (1990) 1st official album
- Entre La Espada Y La Pared (1991) 1st album on Sony Discos
- Del Norte Al Sur (1992)
- Corazón de cristal (1994)
- El ganador (1995)
- Duele el amor (1996)
- Arco iris de papel (1997)
- Te seguire (1998)
- Por eso te amo (1999)
- Para ti (2000) (Last album on Sony Discos)
- Obsesión (2000) (First album on Fonovisa)
- Un poco más (2002)
- Tócame (2003) (Last album on Fonovisa)
- Canciones de la Rockola (2003) (First album on Urbana Records)
- Atrevete (2005)
- Evoluciones (2006) (Album return to Fonovisa/Universal)
- Me Enamoré de un Angel (2008) (Album return to Urbana Records)
- Rockola 2 (2009)
- Siente El Amor (2013)
- Strait Tejano (2014)
- Piénsalo (2016) (First album on M Music & Entertainment Group/Freddie Records)
- Con la fuerza de un huracán (2019)

== Awards ==
The group won both a Grammy Award and a Latin Grammy for best Tejano album, for 1999's Por Eso Te Amo, and a Latin Grammy for best Tejano album for 2006's Evoluciones.
