= 2026 Tejano Music Awards =

American award ceremony

46th Annual Tejano Music Awards
- Date: November 13, 2026
- Location: Texas Rodeo Saloon, Katy, Texas
- Hosted by: Efrain "Happy the Entertainer" Guerrero

Highlights
- Most awards: Stefani Montiel (2); Jay Perez (2)
- Most nominations: Jay Perez (5)
- Website: tejanomusicawards.com

The 46th Annual Tejano Music Awards ceremony was held on November 13, 2026, at the Texas Rodeo Saloon in Katy, Texas. Known as "the biggest night in Tejano music", it was the second consecutive ceremony to be held at the Texas Rodeo Saloon. Hugo Guerrero received the Lifetime Achievement Award. Performances at the ceremony included Stefani Montiel, Jay Perez, Ram Herrera, Avizo, Savannah V, Jesse Turner, and Irany. Jenny B, who won Best New Female Artist at the 45th awards, opened the ceremony.

The Tejano Music Awards Fan Fair, typically held before the awards ceremony, was announced on January 27, 2026, to take place March 12–15, 2026. The four-day festival was held at the Hemisfair Park. On May 26, the Texas Talent Musicians Association began allowing artists, record labels, and representatives to submit their works for the 2026 Tejano Music Awards until June 21. On September 4, fan voting closed, while industry voting continued through September 27. On October 26, the nominations for the 46th Tejano Music Awards were announced as well as comedian Efrain "Happy the Entertainer" Guerrero selected to host the ceremony.

Joey Guerra of the Houston Chronicle, noting the prevailing notion that Tejano music needs new artists, found the 46th Tejano Music Awards full of veteran musicians. This was echoed by Rhyma Castillo of the San Antonio Express-News, who wrote that several Tejano favorites earned accolades that night. Guerra wrote that Happy the Entertainer opened the show by informing the crowd that "it was a night to celebrate legends." Montiel missed the announcements for her wins for Female Vocalist of the Year and Entertainer of the Year due to changing outfits for her performance at the event. Perez, who won Male Vocalist of the Year, dedicated the award to fellow nominee Ricardo Castillon, who never received the award.

== Awards ==
Winners are listed first, highlighted in boldface, and indicated with a double dagger (‡).

**Male Vocalist of the Year**: **Jay Perez** ‡; Gary Hobbs; Lucky Joe; Ram Herrera; Ricardo Castillon	**Female Vocalist of the Year**: **Stefani Montiel** ‡; Fer Villarreal; Patsy Torres; Roxanne "Roxy P." Perez
**Best New Artist – Male**: **John "Chris" Martinez"** ‡; Danny Noyola; JR Renya; El Vidal; Gilbert Zamora	**Best New Artist – Female**: **Aisa** ‡; Gigi "La Sheekano" Guerrero; Amber Martinez; Amanda Solis; Kamila Urbina
**Best New Artist – Group**: **Grupo Entrego** ‡; Domingo Elias 3Zero; El Vidal; JR Reyna Y Elegido; Kamila Y Bella Divas; Leo Y Temptacion	**Entertainer of the Year**: **Stefani Montiel** ‡
**Album of the Year – Tejano**: **Le Seguiremos** – **Jay Perez** ‡; 3225 – David Lee Garza Y Los Musicales; 45th Anniversary EP, Volume 1 – Ram Herrera & The Outlaw Band; Canciones del Corazon – Lucky Joe; Seguire – Stefani Montiel	**Album of the Year – Conjunto**: **A Otro Nivel** – **Da Krazy Pimpz** ‡; Borracho Y Perdido – Jonny Martinez Y Grupo Bravo; Para Nuestra Gente – Los Estrellas De Oro
**Song of the Year**: **"Vuela Madrecita"** – **Siggno** ‡; "Buena Suerte Corazon" – Los Arcos Hermanos Peña; "Delante De Ti" – David Lee Garza Y Los Musicales; "Le Seguiremos" – Jay Perez; "Nada" – Stefani Montiel; "Puede Ser" – Ram Herrera	**Collaboration of the Year**: **"Haces Falta Tu"** – **David Lee Garza Y Los Musicales featuring Pete Astudillo** ‡; "El Cisne" – Adalberto Gallegos, Bobby G, and Jay Perez; "La Cervecita" – Lucky Joe featuring Chingo Bling; "Amarillo By Morning" – Siggno featuring Aaron Watson; "No Vale La Pena" – Texas Latino featuring Cezar Omar
**Country Song of the Year**: **"Just One Time"** – **Ram Herrera** ‡; "Amarillo By Morning" – Siggno featuring Aaron Watson; "All The Stars In Texas" – Tejano Highway 281; "La Misma Cama" – Stefani Montiel; "Someday" – Jay Perez	**Video of the Year**: **"Soy Libre"** – **Gary Hobbs** ‡
**Lifetime Achievement Award**: **Hugo Guerrero** ‡
