= Tejano Music Award for Entertainer of the Year =

US annual music award

- Current: 2025 Tejano Music Awards
- Awarded for: Entertainer of the Year
- Country: United States
- Presented by: Local television and radio stations
- First award: 2007
- Currently held by: Ricardo Castillon (2025)

Highlights
- Most awards: Elida Reyna (4)
- Website: Tejano Music Awards

The Tejano Music Award for Entertainer of the Year is an honor presented annually by the Texas Talent Musicians Association (TTMA). The honor was presented to Tejano music musicians beginning at the 27th Tejano Music Awards after merging the Female Entertainer of the Year and Male Entertainer of the Year categories. The most awarded female musician is Elida Reyna who received four wins, while Jay Perez and Jesse Turner have tied with most wins by a male musician (at two wins each).

== Winners and nominees ==
Listed below are the winners of the award for each year, as well as the other nominees.

Key	Meaning
‡	Indicates the winner

Year	Performer	Ref
2007 (27th)	Jay Perez‡	
2008 (28th)	Jay Perez‡	
2009 (29th)	Ruben Ramos‡	
2009 (29th)	Eddie Gonzalez	
2009 (29th)	Jay Perez	
2009 (29th)	Jimmy Gonzalez	
2009 (29th)	Sunny Sauceda	
2010 (30th)	Jimmy Gonzalez‡	
2010 (30th)	Art Tigerina	
2010 (30th)	Elida Reyna	
2010 (30th)	Ruben Ramos	
2011 (31st)	Elida Reyna‡	
2011 (31st)	Bobby Pulido	
2011 (31st)	Jay Perez	
2011 (31st)	Jesse Turner	
2011 (31st)	Shelly Lares	
2012 (32nd)	Elida Reyna‡	
2012 (32nd)	Michael Salgado	
2012 (32nd)	Jay Perez	
2012 (32nd)	Jimmy Gonzalez	
2012 (32nd)	Shelly Lares	
2013 (33rd)	Jesse Turner‡	
2013 (33rd)	AJ Castillo	
2013 (33rd)	Elida Reyna	
2013 (33rd)	Shelly Lares	
2013 (33rd)	Stefani Montiel	
2014 (34th)	Elida Reyna‡	
2014 (34th)	Albert Zamora	
2014 (34th)	David Lee Garza	
2014 (34th)	Jimmy Gonzalez	
2014 (34th)	Shelly Lares	
2015 (35th)	Jesse Turner‡	
2015 (35th)	AJ Castillo	
2015 (35th)	Elida Reyna	
2015 (35th)	Jimmy Gonzalez	
2015 (35th)	Michael Salgado	
2016 (36th)	Elida Reyna‡	
2016 (36th)	Jaime De Anda, of Jaime Y Los Chamacos	
2016 (36th)	Michael Salgado	
2016 (36th)	Ram Herrera	
2016 (36th)	Ruben Ramos	
2017 (37th)	Stefani Montiel‡	
2018 (38th)	Da Krazy Pimpz‡	
2019 (39th)	Sunny Sauceda‡	
2020 (40th)	Gary Hobbs‡	
2021 (41st)	Eddie Gonzalez‡	
2022 (42nd)	Sunny Sauceda‡	
2023 (43rd)	Ricardo Castillon y La Diferenzia‡	
2024 (44th)	Stefani Montiel‡	
2025 (45th)	Ricardo Castillon‡	
