= Tejano Music Award for Album of the Year – Tejano =

American music award

- Current: 2025 Tejano Music Awards
- Awarded for: Tejano Album of the Year
- Country: United States
- Presented by: Local television and radio stations
- First award: 2003
- Currently held by: Texas Latino (2025)

Highlights
- Most awards: Elida Reyna (6)
- Website: Tejano Music Awards

The Tejano Music Award for Tejano Album of the Year (formerly the Tejano Music Award for Best Tejano/Norteño Album) is an honor presented annually by the Texas Talent Musicians Association (TTMA). The award was first presented at the 23rd Tejano Music Awards (TMA) and was not given out at the 24th and 29th awards ceremony. Previously, musicians who predominantly record Tejano recordings were nominated for either the Tejano Music Award for Best Conjunto Album, Orchestra Album of the Year, Album of the Year – Traditional, or Album of the Year – Progressive, depending on their style of music: conjunto, cumbia, pop ballads, or polka music. Since the genre's popularity faded after the mid-1990s, the TMAs either merged or retired the over-categorization of their album-of-the-year categories through the 2000s decade. The record and current holder of the award is Elida Reyna, who won four non-consecutive times. The Tejano Music Award for Tejano Urban Album of the Year was a subcategory of the award and included nominations from musicians who recorded urbanized Tejano recordings; this was awarded to musicians at the 25th and 26th awards ceremony. No artist won twice, though DJ Kane remains the only musician to have been nominated twice for the award.

== Recipients ==
Year	Performing artist(s)	Work	Nominees	Ref.
2003	Intocable	Sueños	Bobby Pulido – Bobby; Duelo – El Amor No Acaba; Ramón Ayala – El Numero Cien; Siggno – Por Amor	
2004	Not awarded			
2005	Jimmy González y Grupo Mazz	Para Mi Gente	Bob Gallarza – Pride & Passion; David Marez – Bringin' It Back; Delia Gonzales – Ahora Me Toca a Mi; Gary Hobbs – Ayer y Hoy; Jessy Serrata – Better Than Ever; La Fiebre – Reunidos; Linna Y Estilo – Corazoncito; Más Ambición – Muevanse; Megan Leyva – Cara de Angel; Grupo Vida – Vivo; Shelly Lares – Sigue Mi Camino	
2006	Jimmy González y Grupo Mazz	Mejor Que Nunca	AT Boyz – Fuego Amor; Jay Perez – Jay Live in Concert; Las 3 Divas – Las 3 Divas; Avizo – Power of Friends	
2007	Jay Perez	All of Me		
2008	Ruben Ramos	35th Anniversary		
2009	Not awarded			
2010	David Lee Garza	Aqui Estate	Elida Reyna – Live; Jimmy González y Grupo Mazz – Eternamente; Ruben Ramos – Revolutionized; Stefani Montiel – Divinia	
2011	Elida Reyna	Fantasia	AJ Castillo – On My Way; Gary Hobbs – Aprendi A Volar; Jimmy González y Grupo Mazz – Mi Vida Sin Tu Amor; Shelly Lares – Mirando Adelante	
2012	Siggno	Lo Que Me Dejaste	Jay Perez – The Voice of Authority	
2013	Elida Reyna y Avante	Contigo Descubri	Ricardo Castillon y La Diferenzia – All For You; Jay Perez – New Horizons; David Marez – Voz de Oro; David Lee Garza y Los Musicales – Y Ahora Aqui	
2014	Elida Reyna	EYA Nation	Shelly Lares – De Mi Corazon; Ricky Valenz – El Tiempo Ha Llegado; Jimmy González y Grupo Mazz – Forever Mazz; David Lee Garza – Just Friends	
2015	Elida Reyna	Al Fin Completa	La Tropa F – No Regrets; La Fiebre – Nueva Era; Jimmy González y Grupo Mazz – Iconic; AJ Castillo – Sin Limites	
2016	Elida Reyna y Avante	Adicta	David Lee Garza y Los Musicales – 2715; Ruben Ramos – El Idolo de Tejas; Ram Herrera – Mucho Mas Que Amor; Tejano Highway 281 – Te Amo Como Me Amas	
2017	Jay Perez	Un Amigo Tendras	Stefani Montiel – La Dueña; La Sombra – Look Who’s Back; Jimmy González y Grupo Mazz – Que Cante El Mundo; David Lee Garza Y Los Musicales – Una Noche A Tu Lado	
2018	Elida Reyna Y Avante	Mi Epoca	Raulito Navaira Y Remedio – Alivia Tu Corazon; Eddie Gonzalez – Kickin’ It Again; Tejano Highway 281 – Mirame A Los Ojos; Isabel Marie – Sigueme	
2019	Lucky Joe	Tu Principe	Stefani Montiel – Amor Supernatural; Elida Reyna Y Avante – Colores; Michael Salgado – La Vida En Un Hilo; Jimmy Gonzalez Y Grupo Mazz – Porque Todavia Te Quiero	
2020	Jay Perez	25th Anniversary Contigo	Los Palominos – Con La Fuerza De Un Huracan; Isabel Marie – IV; Ernestine Romero – Mi Tesoro; Shelly Lares – Obra De Amor	
2021	Patsy Torres	Dame Tu Corazon	Jimmy Lee & Friends – Familia (Jessy Serrata Tribute); Stevie D & The All Star Cast – Estamos Unidos; Destiny Navaira – La Prefereida; Severo Y Grupo Fuego – Pura Vida	
2022	Jay Perez	El Maestro	Texas Latino – Fe; La Fiebre – Historico; Shelly Lares – LMD82; Monica Saldivar – Soy Mas Fuerte	
2023	Siggno	Sobrevivir	Destiny Navaira – Dime Como Se Siente; Joe Lopez – Love From The Heart; Gary Hobbs – Sin Fin; Monica Saldivar – Soy Mas Fuerte (Deluxe)	
2024	Jay Perez	El Patron	Texas Latino – 30th Anniversary, Vol. 1; Los Palominos – El Orgullo de Uvalde; Elida Reyna Y Avante – Herencia De Una Reyna; Stefani Montiel – Mis Favoritas, Vol. 1	
2025	Texas Latino	Texas Latino Volumen II	Monica Saldivar – III; David Lee Rodriquez y Cuatro11 – Mi Vida; Stefani Montiel – Mis Favoritas Vol. II; Pio Treviño – Simplemente Mejor	

=== Urban Tejano ===
Year	Performing artist(s)	Work	Nominees	Ref.
2005	DJ Kane	DJ Kane	ATM – Union Revolucion; K1 – Nuestro Turno; Más Ambición – Muevanse; Stefani Montiel – Takin' on the World	
2006	Grupo Vida	Prisoner of the Honky Tonk	DJ Kane – Capitulo II: Brinca; La Conquista – La Conquista; Roel y La Fe Morena – Conquistando Fronteras; Volumen X – Sigo Pensando en Ti	
