= 2023 Tejano Music Awards =

43rd Annual Tejano Music Awards
- Date: October 21, 2023
- Location: Boeing Center at Tech Port; San Antonio, Texas

Highlights
- Most awards: Jesse Turner (2); Mike Gonzalez & The Iconiczz (2)
- Most nominations: Monica Saldivar (5)
- Website: tejanomusicawards.com

The 43rd Annual Tejano Music Awards ceremony was held on October 21, 2023, at the Boeing Center at Tech Port in San Antonio, Texas. Those who performed at the ceremony were Siggno, Ricardo Castillon, Isabel Marie, Angelica y Moneda, Grupo Asalto, Suenatron, and Paula DeAnda.

On September 28, 2023, it was announced that Mazz co-founder and vocalist Joe López and songwriter Humberto Ramón would receive Lifetime Achievement Awards, but this honor was rescinded for López on October 18 after public outcry about his 2006–2018 incarceration for sexual assault. The 2023 Tejano Music Awards Fan Fair that preceded the awards ceremony, drew 125,000 people during the four-day event. More than 100 musicians performed during the event.

The biggest winners were Jesse Turner of Siggno (Male Vocalist of the Year and Tejano Album of the Year), and Mike González and the Iconiczz (Best New Group and Best New Female Artist for Di Marie). With five nominations, Monica Saldivar was the most nominated artist. Destiny Navaira earned her second Tejano Music Award for Female Vocalist of the Year, her last time was at the 41st Tejano Music Awards in 2021.

== Awards ==
Winners are listed first, highlighted in boldface, and indicated with a double dagger (‡).

**Entertainer of the Year**: **Ricardo Castillon y La Diferenzia**‡	**Male Vocalist of the Year**: **Jesse Turner**‡; Elias Arredondo; Emanuel J; Joe López; Ricardo Castillon
**Female Vocalist of the Year**: **Destiny Navaria**‡; Isabel Marie; Monica Saldivar	**Best New Artist Group**: **Mike Gonzalez & The Iconiczz**‡; Joe Lara Y Grupo Xprezzion; Jr Reyna Y Elegido; Laura Denisse Y Los Brillantes
**Best New Artist Male**: **Leeroy Camarillo**‡; Hernan Hernandez Jr; Javier Soliz; Joe Lara; Rocky Beltran	**Best New Artist Female**: **Di Marie**‡; Hilda Llamas; Laura Denisse; Madison Pulido
**Album of the Year – Tejano**: **Sobrevivir – Siggno**‡; Dime Como Se Siente – Destiny Navaria; Love From the Heart – Joe López y Grupo Mazz; Sin Fin – Gary Hobbs; Soy Mas Fuerte (Deluxe) – Monica Saldivar	**Album of the Year – Conjunto**: **Oddz – The Homeboyz**‡; Alza Los Ojos – Los Hermanos Sanchez; Una Promesa – South TX Homies
**Song of the Year**: **"Necesito Odiarte" – Jay Perez**‡; "Ahora Que Ya Eres Feliz" – Isabel Marie; "Infraganti" – Monica Saldivar; "Mi Guerita" – Lucky Joe; "Quedate Con El" – Stefani Montiel	**Collaboration of the Year**: **"No Me Olvides " – Monica Saldivar and Shelly Lares**‡; "A Mi Lado" – Emanuel J and Monica Saldivar; "Corazon Corazoncito" – Tony Barragan and Ruben Ramos; "Llorar Quedito" – Ismael Gutierrerz and Luis Adrian Gutierrez; "Yo Te Daba Todo" – Destiny Navaira and Jose Adan Esparza
**Video of the Year**: **"Nino" – Sunny Sauceda Y Todo Eso**‡

== Controversy ==
In announcing that Mazz co-founder Joe López would be receiving the Lifetime Achievement Award, the Texas Talent Musicians Association (TTMA), the producers of the Tejano Music Awards, sent to their followers and media outlets a misinforming email that attributed the 2001–2004, 2009, and 2014 Latin Grammy Awards won by Jimmy González and his solo group to López. In response, the "Forever Jimmy G." organization took to social media to request that the TTMA retract the statement, stressing that the 2009 and 2014 awards were won while López was incarcerated and would certainly be unable to win or produce music. The organization urged Gonzalez's fans, family, friends, and musicians to protest the TTMA.

On September 30, 2023, the TTMA sent another email that corrected López's biography. The revised version eliminated the inaccurate claims, gave more credit to González, and included an apology for any confusion or offense caused by the original. The TTMA's email explained that they had obtained the biography information from "in-the-know sources" but recognized that certain crucial details may have been misleading or incorrect.

Tejano fans and industry professionals also expressed anger and disappointment at the decision to award López because of his 2006–2018 incarceration for sexually assaulting his niece. On October 18, the TTMA decided to not give López the Lifetime Achievement Award, but kept in awarding him Male Vocalist of the Year and Album of the Year. López did not attend the ceremony.
