= 2024 Tejano Music Awards =

44th Annual Tejano Music Awards
- Date: November 22, 2024
- Location: Boeing Center at Tech Port; San Antonio, Texas

Highlights
- Most awards: Jay Perez (3)
- Most nominations: Jay Perez (4); Stefani Montiel (4)
- Website: tejanomusicawards.com

The 44th Annual Tejano Music Awards ceremony was held on November 22, 2024, at the Boeing Center at Tech Port in San Antonio, Texas. The event was hosted by comedians Chona E and John Perez. Chona E became the first female comedian to host the Tejano Music Awards. A live tribute performance by Powerhouse Avizo honored Jimmy Edward, Joe Bravo, Jimmy Gonzalez, Steve Jordan, Jessy Serrata, Alfonso Ramos, and Emilio Navaira. The night's performers included Da Krazy Pimpz, David Marez, Jay Perez, La Calma, Lucky Joe, Solido, Stefani Montiel, Sunny Sauceda, and The Homeboyz. Actor Valente Rodriguez was the special guest in attendance.

Singer David Marez and singer-songwriter Placido Salazar were honored with the Lifetime Achievement Award. Gabriella Martinez won Best New Female Artist. Her album Siempre Gabriella, was nominated for Best Tejano Album at the 2024 Grammy Awards. Jay Perez received the most awards and tied with Stefani Montiel for the most nominations, with four each.

On December 28, the show was broadcast on 13 Sinclair Broadcast Group TV stations across the United States.

== Pre-show ==
On September 8, it was announced that Powerhouse Avizo was to perform a tribute to Jimmy Edward, Joe Bravo, Jimmy Gonzalez, Steve Jordan, Jessy Serrata, Alfonso Ramos, and Emilio Navaira. It was also revealed that Da Krazy Pimpz, David Marez, Jay Perez, La Calma, Lucky Joe, Solido, Stefani Montiel, Sunny Sauceda, and The Homeboyz were to perform at the event.

A red-carpet ceremony preceded the awards and it was hosted by Bo Corona, of Fierro HD and Klub Tejano.

On November 15, it was revealed that comedians from San Antonio, Chona E and John Perez, were to host the event. Chona E became the first female comedian to host the Tejano Music Awards. KSAT-TV believed the additions of the comedians "will bring a fresh, energetic vibe to the evening, making this year's awards show one to remember."

== Awards ==
Winners are listed first, highlighted in boldface, and indicated with a double dagger (‡).

**Entertainer of the Year**: **Stefani Montiel**‡	**Male Vocalist of the Year**: **Jay Perez**‡; Gabe Rivera; Gary Hobbs; James Arreola; Lucky Joe
**Female Vocalist of the Year**: **Elida Reyna**‡; Laura Linda; Patsy Torres; Savannah V; Stefani Montiel	**Best New Artist – Group**: **Joey Martinez Y Miradas**‡; JR Reyna Y Elegido; Los Estrellas de Oro; Revo Live Band; Tejano Bluesman Y La Nueva Onda
**Best New Artist – Male**: **Joey Martinez**‡; Joe Villanueva; George Salazar; JR Reyna; Sergio "Chex" Lozano	**Best New Artist – Female**: **Gabriella Martinez**‡; Joanna Rae; Lorena Mejia; Martiza Gomez; Steffanie Martinez
**Album of the Year – Tejano**: **El Patron – Jay Perez**‡; 30th Anniversary, Vol. I – Texas Latino; El Orgullo de Uvalde – Los Palominos; Herencia De Una Reyna – Elida Reyna Y Avante; Mis Favoritas, Vol. I – Stefani Montiel	**Album of the Year – Conjunto**: **Pa'Que No Te Cuenten – Lucky Joe**‡; Entre Copas Y Canciones – Los Caporales de Flaco Jimenez y Fred Ojeda; Sangre Nueva – Da Krazy Pimpz; Tanto Tanto – Los Cucuys de Rodney Rodriguez
**Song of the Year**: **"Vino Maldito" – Jay Perez featuring David Lee Garza**‡; "La Soledad" – Bobby Pulido, MC Davo, Monica Saldivar; "Piedeme La Lunda" – La Calma; "Ven Devorname Otra Vez" – Stefani Montiel; "Vive Con Ganas" – Patsy Torres	**Collaboration of the Year**: **"Es Contigo" – Elida Reyna and James Arreola**‡; "Borron Y Cuenta Nueva" – Gary Hobbs and Freddie Martinez; "Vino Maldito" – Jay Perez and David Lee Garza; "Cuando Me De La Gana" – Stefani Montiel and Cezar Omar; "No Puedo Olivdarte" – Yeisi and Ram Herrera
**Video of the Year**: **"Con La Mirada" – Gabriella Martinez**‡	**Lifetime Achievement Award**: **David Marez**‡; **Placido Salazar**‡
