= Tejano Music Award for Lifetime Achievement Award =

American music award

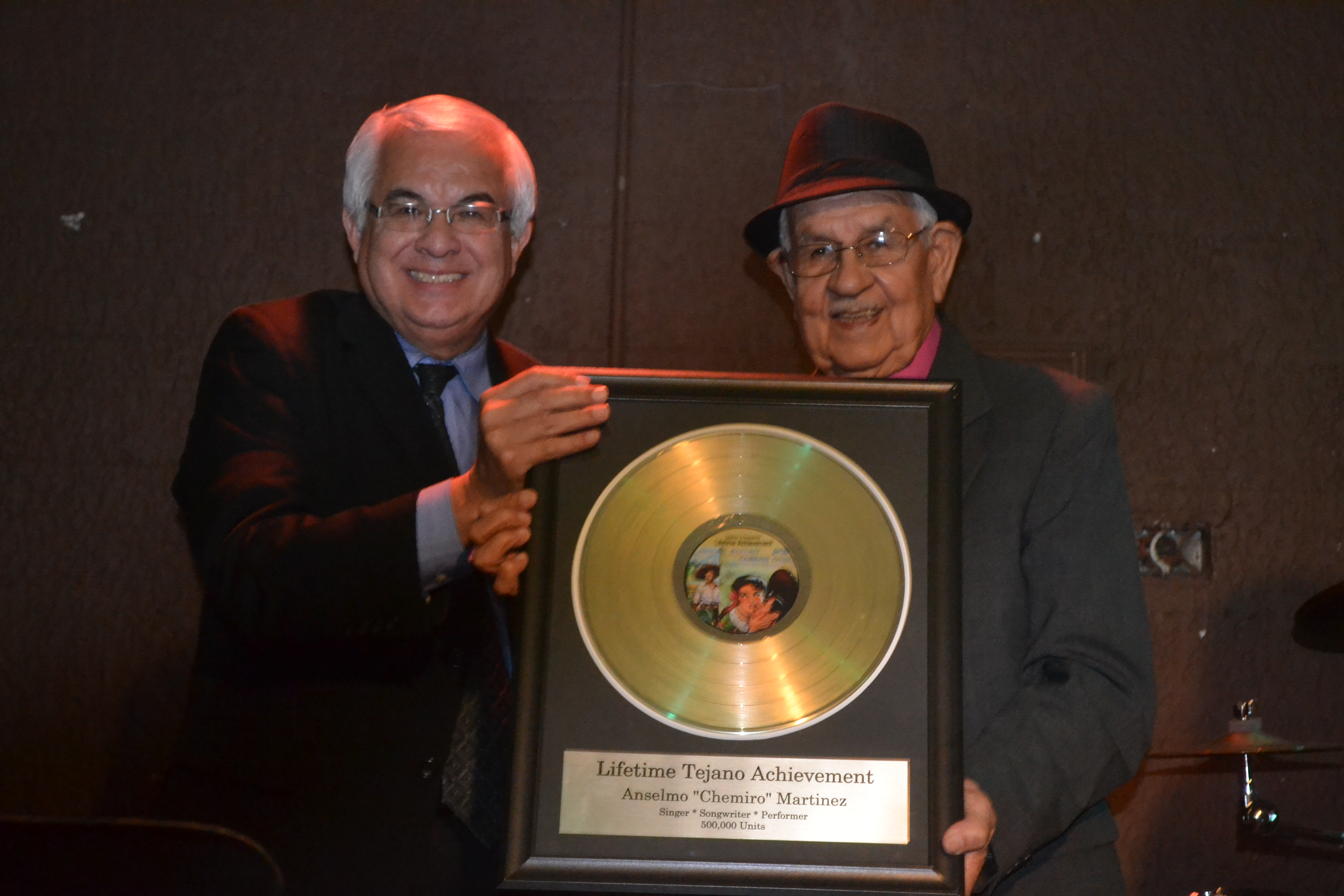
- Lifetime Achievement Award to Anselmo Martinez
- Country: United States
- Presented by: Texas Talent Musician Association
- First award: 1993
- Currently held by: Johnny Hernandez; Ram Herrera
- Website: Tejanomusicawards.com

The Tejano Music Award for Lifetime Achievement Award is an honor presented annually at the Tejano Music Awards. It is presented to individuals who have made significant contributions to Tejano music over the course of their entire careers. While the Texas Talent Musician Association has given out "special lifetime" honors since 1993, the first recipients of the Lifetime Achievement Award were La Mafia when it was established at the 1999 Tejano Music Awards. The current holders of the award are Johnny Hernandez and Ram Herrera, who received the award at the 2025 Tejano Music Awards.

== Recipients ==
=== Pre-1999 ===
Prior to the establishment of the Lifetime Achievement Award in 1999, the Tejano Music Awards gave out "Special (Lifetime) Achievement" recognitions These honors were presented sporadically at the annual Tejano Music Awards and, by the late 1990s, at the Tejano Roots Hall of Fame ceremony preceding the awards show. At the 1993 Tejano Music Awards, Bob Gallarza received the Special Achievement Award, while Marcelo Tafoya received a Lifetime Achievement Award (the first ever given). At the 1997 Tejano Music Awards, radio announcer Luciano Duarte and Manuel Davila, Sr. were both honored with a Lifetime Achievement. In 1999, radio and television personality Rogelio Botello Rios received a Lifetime Achievement accolade, while a "special achievement award" was given to music promoter Arnaldo "Nano" Ramirez, Jr. at the 1999 Tejano Roots Hall of Fame ceremony.

=== Lifetime Achievement Award ===
The following individuals have received Lifetime Achievement Awards, listed by year.

| Year | Recipient | Ref. |
|---|---|---|
| 2025 | Johnny Hernandez, Ram Herrera | |
| 2024 | David Marez, Placido Salazar | |
| 2023 | Humberto "Beto" Ramon | |
| 2022 | Gilbert Gonzalez, Roman Martinez | |
| 2021 | —N/a | |
| 2020 | —N/a | |
| 2019 | Linda Escobar, Gilbert Rodriguez | |
| 2018 | Emilio Navaira, Jimmy Gonzalez | |
| 2017 | Laura Canales | |
| 2016 | Bob Grever | |
| 2015 | Ruben "El Gato Negro" Ramos, Roberto Pulido | |
| 2014 | Bobby "El Charro Negro" Butler, Jimmy Edward | |
| 2013 | Carlos Guzman, Paulino Bernal | |
| 2012 | Elsa Garcia, Mingo Saldivar, Johnny Canales | |
| 2011 | Janie Esparza, Flaco Jiménez | |
| 2010 | —N/a | |
| 2009 | Joe Bravo, Augustin Ramirez | |
| 2008 | Joey Lopez, Arturo Villareal, Freddie Martinez | |
| 2007 | —N/a | |
| 2006 | The Royal Jesters (Oscar Lawson, Henry Hernandez) | |
| 2005 | Rudy Trevino, Gibby Escobedo | |
| 2004 | —N/a | |
| 2003 | Tony Garza | |
| 2002 | Isidro López | |
| 2001 | Selena | |
| 2000 | Sunny Ozuna | |
| 1999 | La Mafia | |

== Controversy ==
Following the announcement that Joe Lopez, a former musician for Grupo Mazz, would be receiving the Lifetime Achievement Award at the 2023 Tejano Music Awards, the Forever Jimmy G Organization had taken to social media to express their apprehensions and request that the Texas Talent Musicians Association (TTMA), the producers of the Tejano Music Awards, to rectify misinformation propagated in an email sent to their followers and the media. According to the organization, the email wrongly attributed Grammy Awards won by Jimmy Gonzalez, lead singer of Grupo Mazz, during his solo career from 1999 to 2018 to Joe Lopez, in a biography falsely crediting him as the recipient. The statement argues that this enables Lopez to impersonate Gonzalez and his career achievements, including the claim that Lopez is the founder of Group Mazz and thus entitled to Gonzalez's awards. The statement contends that Gonzalez effectively carried on with Grupo Mazz after Lopez's departure in 1997, leading to Grammy and Latin Grammy Awards for Best Tejano Album between 2001 and 2004, 2009, and 2014. Public records confirm Gonzalez registered the name Mazz in 2000, maintaining it until his death in 2018. The organization stresses that Lopez was incarcerated from 2006 to 2017, during which time he was neither actively nor publicly receiving awards. Allowing Lopez to claim these honors, they argue, is misleading and undermines Gonzalez's contributions to Tejano music. The organization urged Gonzalez's fans, family, friends, and musicians to protest the TTMA.

On September 30, 2023, the TTMA updated its biography for Lopez through an email to its followers and media outlets. The revised version eliminated the inaccurate claims and gave more credit to Gonzalez. The email also included an apology for any confusion or offense caused by the original biography. The TTMA explained in the email that they had obtained the biography information from "in-the-know sources" but recognized that certain crucial details may have been misleading or incorrect. The website, Tejano Nation, commented that the TTMA did not address another contentious issue related to Lopez's recognition as it relates to his status as a paroled sex offender. Fans of Tejano music and industry professionals have expressed their anger and disappointment at the TTMA's decision to give a Lifetime Achievement Award to Lopez, given his criminal history. According to Tejano Nation, the TTMA has not issued a statement on this matter and believes that TTMA has not "indicated any plans to rescind or reconsider Lopez's award". During the award ceremony, Humberto "Beto" Ramon was the sole honoree for the Lifetime Achievement Award after the organization decided to rescind Joe Lopez following widespread public outcry.

== Works cited ==
- Medina, John Henry (17 October 2024). "David Marez to Receive Lifetime Achievement Award at 44th Annual Tejano Music Awards". Tejano Nation. Archived from the original on 2026-03-13.
- Medina, John Henry (2024-10-30). "Tejano Music Awards to Honor Placido Salazar with Lifetime Achievement Award". Tejano Nation. Archived from the original on 2024-11-01.
- Medina, John Henry; Rodriguez, Lexie (30 September 2023). "Controversy Surrounding Joe Lopez's Lifetime Achievement Award at the 43rd Tejano Music Awards". Tejano Nation.
- Medina, John Henry (1 October 2023). "TTMA corrects Joe Lopez bio for Lifetime Achievement Award after controversy". Tejano Nation.
- Medina, John Henry (18 October 2023). "Tejano Music Awards withdraws Lifetime Achievement honor for Joe Lopez". Tejano Nation.
- "Past Tejano Music Awards Winners 1981 to Present". Tejano Music Awards. Archived from the original on 27 June 2015.
- Suarez, Carmen (March 21, 1993). "Award Show Honors Tejano Musicians". Abilene Reporter-News – via Newspapers.com.
- Cabrera, Rene (March 7, 1997). "Award Winner Moreno to play in Alice". Corpus Christi Caller-Times – via Newspapers.com.
- Maldonado, Vilma (March 12, 1999). "South Texas Talent Recognized Statewide in Hall of Fame". The Monitor – via Newspapers.com.
- Medina, John Henry (18 October 2023). "Tejano Music Awards withdraws Lifetime Achievement honor for Joe Lopez". Tejano Nation.
- Medina, John Henry (28 November 2022). "Jay Perez and Shelly Lares take top honors at 42nd Tejano Music Awards – Full Winners List". Tejano Nation.
- Medina, John Henry (2025-11-22). "45th Tejano Music Awards Shine Spotlight on Next-Generation Stars at New Katy Venue". Tejano Nation. Archived from the original on 2025-11-22.
