= 2022 Tejano Music Awards =

42nd Annual Tejano Music Awards
- Official poster
- Date: November 26, 2022
- Location: Tech Port Center + Arena; San Antonio, Texas
- Website: tejanomusicawards.com

The 42nd Annual Tejano Music Awards ceremony was held on November 26, 2022. It recognized the best recordings, compositions, and artists of Tejano music during the eligibility year, running from January 1, 2021, to December 31, 2021.

The 42nd Annual Tejano Music Awards was held at the Tech Port Center + Arena in San Antonio, Texas. It was the first ceremony to have a live show and in-person audience since the 2019 Tejano Music Awards.

Jay Perez and Shelly Lares received the most nominations. The Lifetime Achievement Awards were presented to Gilbert Velasquez and Roman Martinez, who founded The Hometown Boys. The show featured performances by Lares, Perez, Isabel Marie, Sunny Sauceda, Stefani Montiel, The Homeboyz, Monica Saldivar, and included a showcase of new artists in Tejano music. On December 8, 2022, the show was broadcast on WOAI-TV.

== Pre-show and voting ==
Unlike the previous ceremonies, singles released in 2020 or a single released in 2021 on an album released in 2022, are eligible for submission for the Tejano Music Award for Song of the Year category. Nominations and applications began on June 20, 2022. The Texas Talent Association requested that any musician, manager, record label, or artist representative could submit a nomination on their website and had to submit two CDs or two USB thumb drives for verification and eligibility. Nominations were being accepted until July 31, 2022. During preliminaries, industry voting commenced on August 21, 2022, through September 18, 2022. Industry voting submitted through mail had to be postmarked by September 16, 2022, to be accepted. The top 12 nominations for each category were announced on the Tejano Music Award website on October 3, 2022, and was open to public voting until November 6, 2022.

It was announced on July 6, 2022, that the 42nd annual Tejano Music Awards (TMAs) would be held at the 3,200-seat Tech Port Center + Arena in San Antonio, Texas. The venue opened in May 2022 and is the first time that the TMAs were held there.

As customary, the Tejano Music Awards Fan Fair took place before the awards ceremony. Spanning the weekend of March 17, the fan fair was hosted at San Antonio's Market Square. More than 150 musicians and bands performed at the event, while it received sponsorship from Modelo and Hermes Music.

== Awards ==
Winners are listed first, highlighted in boldface, and indicated with a double dagger (‡).

**Entertainer of the Year**: **Sunny Sauceda**‡	**Male Vocalist of the Year**: **Jay Perez**‡; David Farias; Gabe Rivera (of Texas Latino); J Angle Cantu (of La Fiebre); Lucky Joe
**Female Vocalist of the Year**: **Shelly Lares**‡; Anjelique; Betty Barajas (of Conjunto Baraja de Oro); Magali Delarosa; Monica Saldivar	**Best New Artist Group**: **The Homeboyz**‡; Asalto; Lydia Castillo and The Band; Magnifico 7; Zenzio
**Best New Artist Male**: **Elias Arredondo (of The Homeboyz)**‡; Bobby “Cricket” Aguilera; JC Hernandez; Joe Villanueva; Jordan Rodriguez (of Asalto)	**Best New Artist Female**: **Angelica Alcoser**‡; Celestina Robles; Cynthia Bustamante; Gabriella Salazar; Lydia Castillo
**Album of the Year – Tejano**: **El Mastro – Jay Perez**‡; Fe – Texas Latino; Historico – La Fiebre; LMD82 – Shelly Lares; Soy Mas Fuerte – Monica Saldivar	**Album of the Year – Conjunto**: **Norteno y Poderoso (Tributo a Mis Idolos) – Lucky Joe**‡; De Enero a Diciembre – Joe Lara Y Grupo Xprezzion; La Proclamacion – Lazaro Perez; No Te Olvidare – Conjunto Baraja de Oro
**Song of the Year**: **"Eres" – Jay Perez**‡; **"Cuidala"** – La Fiebre; **"Fe"** – Texas Latino; **"Nada De Ti"** – Shelly Lares, Monica Saldivar, Sonja De La Paz, Demmi Garcia; **"Quedate Con El"** – Stefani Montiel	**Collaboration of the Year**: **"Nada De Ti" – Shelly Lares, Monica Saldivar, Sonja De La Paz, Demmi Garcia**‡; **"Amor Ingrato"** – Chente Barrera with Roberto Pulido; **"Ella Solo Es Mi"** – Ricky Guzman and Lazaro Perez; **"Salvaje Pero Amable"** – Anjelique, Esteven Cerda, and Toonz; **"Tu Y Yo"** – Jay Perez and Roxane Perez
**Video of the Year**: **"Amor del Otro Lado" – Roger Velasquez & The Latin Legendz**‡

== Works cited ==
- Karlis, Michael (July 6, 2022). "Tejano Music Awards will make in-person return this fall at San Antonio's Tech Port Arena". San Antonio Current.
- "Guidelines for the 2022 Tejano Music Awards" (PDF). TMAs.com.
- Medina, John Henry (6 July 2022). "42nd annual Tejano Music Awards returns with a live show at San Antonio's new state-of-the-art Tech Port Center + Arena". Tejano Nation.
- Medina, John Henry (28 November 2022). "Jay Perez and Shelly Lares take top honors at 42nd Tejano Music Awards – Full Winners List". Tejano Nation.
- Medina, John Henry (8 December 2022). "42nd Tejano Music Awards to air on San Antonio television station on Dec. 10". Tejano Nation.
- Medina, John Henry (20 June 2022). "Nominations open for the 42nd annual Tejano Music Awards". Tejano Nation.
- "Tejano Music Awards Fan Fair 2022 takes over historic Market Square in downtown SA this week". Tejano Nation. 15 March 2022.
