= Tejano Music Award for Female Entertainer of the Year =

Former American music award

- Current: 2006 Tejano Music Awards
- Awarded for: Female Entertainer of the Year
- Country: United States
- Presented by: Local television and radio stations
- First award: 1981
- Currently held by: Shelly Lares (2006)

Highlights
- Most awards: Selena (9)
- Website: Tejano Music Awards

The Tejano Music Award for Female Entertainer of the Year is an honor presented annually by the Texas Talent Musicians Association (TTMA). The Tejano Music Awards were first awarded in 1981 and was established to recognize the most talented performers of Tejano music—a subgenre of regional Mexican music. The nominees were originally selected by a voting poll conducted among program directors and disc jockeys of Spanish-language radio stations in Texas. Originally, winners were chosen by Tejano radio station KIWW listeners, and later by fans of Tejano musicians in the Southwest of the United States. Winners are selected through a survey of 50,000 Texas households with Hispanic surnames. By 1987, the award ceremony was broadcast through 32 radio stations and 25 local television channels in Texas, New Mexico, Arkansas, Oklahoma and Louisiana. The awards ceremony were originally held at the Henry B. Gonzalez Convention Center, then to the San Antonio Convention Center until 1994, and the Alamodome until 1999. As of 2015, the ceremony is held annually at the Tobin Center for the Performing Arts in San Antonio, Texas.

The award was first presented to Lisa Lopez for two consecutive years. Lopez was credited to have become the first female Tejano singer to have a number one single on the Regional Mexican Airplay chart in 1982. Tejano music's "first leading lady", Laura Canales won the award for four consecutive times. The "Queen of Tejano Music" Selena, dominated the awards for nine consecutive years and dominated the Tejano Music Award for Female Vocalist of the Year for much of the 1990s decade. In 1997, Jennifer Peña won the award, the first time since 1988 that a new recipient won. Pena dominated the award until Elida Reyna won in 2000; she became the second participant to only win the award once, behind Patsy Torres' win in 1987. In 2002, Shelly Lares won for the first time since she was nominated in 1990. Lares won the award three more times until the honor was disestablished following the 2006 Tejano Music Awards along with the Tejano Music Award for Male Entertainer of the Year and were merged into the Tejano Music Award for Entertainer of the Year beginning at the 2007 awards ceremony.

== Winners and nominees ==
Listed below are the winners of the award for each year, as well as the other nominees.

Key	Meaning
‡	Indicates the winner

Year	Performer	Ref
1981 (1st)	Lisa Lopez‡	
1982 (2nd)	Lisa Lopez‡	
1983 (3rd)	Laura Canales‡	
1984 (4th)	Laura Canales‡	
1984 (4th)	Janie Ramirez	
1984 (4th)	Patsy Torres	
1985 (5th)	Laura Canales‡	
1986 (6th)	Laura Canales‡	
1987 (7th)	Patsy Torres‡	
1988 (8th)	Selena‡	
1989 (9th)	Selena‡	
1990 (10th)	Selena‡	
1990 (10th)	Shelly Lares	
1990 (10th)	Cathy Chavez	
1990 (10th)	Patsy Torres	
1990 (10th)	Laura Canales	
1990 (10th)	Agnes Torres	
1990 (10th)	Elsa Garcia	
1990 (10th)	Jean Le Grand	
1991 (11th)	Selena‡	
1991 (11th)	Laura Canales	
1991 (11th)	Shelly Lares	
1992 (12th)	Selena‡	
1992 (12th)	Laura Canales	
1992 (12th)	Shelly Lares	
1993 (13th)	Selena‡	
1993 (13th)	Shelly Lares	
1993 (13th)	Esmeralda	
1994 (14th)	Selena‡	
1994 (14th)	Shelly Lares	
1994 (14th)	Elsa Garcia	
1995 (15th)	Selena‡	
1995 (15th)	Shelly Lares	
1995 (15th)	Stephanie Lynn	
1996 (16th)	Selena‡	
1996 (16th)	Stephanie Lynn	
1996 (16th)	Stefani Montiel	
1996 (16th)	Shelly Lares	
1996 (16th)	Rhonda Lee	
1996 (16th)	Letty Guval	
1996 (16th)	Elsa Garcia	
1996 (16th)	Elida Reyna	
1996 (16th)	Delia Gonzales	
1996 (16th)	Davette Esparza	
1996 (16th)	Annette Arrendondo	
1996 (16th)	Agnes Torres	
1997 (17th)	Jennifer Peña‡	
1997 (17th)	Shelly Lares	
1997 (17th)	Elsa Garcia	
1998 (18th)	Jennifer Peña‡	
1999 (19th)	Jennifer Peña‡	
1999 (19th)	Shelly Lares	
1999 (19th)	Elida Reyna	
2000 (20th)	Elida Reyna‡	
2000 (20th)	Shelly Lares	
2000 (20th)	Jennifer Peña	
2001 (21st)	Jennifer Peña‡	
2001 (21st)	Shelly Lares	
2001 (21st)	Elida Reyna	
2002 (22nd)	Shelly Lares‡	
2002 (22nd)	Jennifer Peña	
2002 (22nd)	Elida Reyna	
2003 (23rd)	Jennifer Peña‡	
2003 (23rd)	Shelly Lares	
2003 (23rd)	Elida Reyna	
2003 (23rd)	Laura Canales	
2003 (23rd)	Margarita	
2004 (24th)	Shelly Lares‡	
2005 (25th)	Shelly Lares‡	
2005 (25th)	Yvette	
2005 (25th)	Stefani Montiel	
2005 (25th)	Megan Leyva	
2005 (25th)	Machy De La Garza	
2005 (25th)	Linna Martinez	
2005 (25th)	Kacy Zavala	
2005 (25th)	Julia Pizano	
2005 (25th)	Elida Reyna	
2005 (25th)	Delia Gonzales	
2006 (26th)	Shelly Lares‡	
2006 (26th)	Elida Reyna	
2006 (26th)	Jessica and Vanessa Maito (Las Florecitas)	
2006 (26th)	Stefani Montiel	
2006 (26th)	Tracy Perez	

== See also ==
- List of music awards honoring women

== Notes ==
- San Miguel, Guadalupe (2002). Tejano Proud: Tex-Mex Music in the Twentieth Century. Texas A&M University Press. ISBN 1585441880. - Read online
- Burr, Ramiro (1999a). The Billboard Guide to Tejano and Regional Mexican Music. Billboard books. ISBN 0823076911.
