= Tejano Music Award for Male Vocalist of the Year =

US annual music award

- Current: 2025 Tejano Music Awards
- Awarded for: Male Vocalist of the Year
- Country: United States
- Presented by: Texas Talent Musicians Association
- First award: 1981
- Currently held by: Gabe Rivera of Texas Latino (2025)

Highlights
- Most awards: Jay Pérez (14)
- Website: Tejano Music Awards

The Tejano Music Award for Male Vocalist of the Year is an honor presented annually by the Texas Talent Musicians Association (TTMA). The Tejano Music Awards were first awarded in 1981 and were established to recognize the most talented performers of Tejano music—a subgenre of regional Mexican music. The nominees were originally selected by a voting poll conducted among program directors and disc jockeys of Spanish-language radio stations in Texas. Originally, winners were chosen by Tejano radio station KIWW listeners and later by fans of Tejano musicians in the Southwest of the United States. Winners are selected through a survey of 50,000 Texas households with Hispanic surnames. By 1987, the award ceremony was being broadcast on 32 radio stations and 25 local television channels across Texas, New Mexico, Arkansas, Oklahoma, and Louisiana. The awards ceremony was originally held at the Henry B. Gonzalez Convention Center, then at the San Antonio Convention Center until 1994, and the Alamodome until 1999. As of 2015, the ceremony is held annually at the Tobin Center for the Performing Arts in San Antonio, Texas.

== Winners and nominees ==
Listed below are the winners of the award for each year, as well as the other nominees.

Key	Meaning
‡	Indicates the winner

Year	Performer	Ref
1981 (1st)	Roberto Pulido‡	
1982 (2nd)	Jimmy Edwards‡	
1983 (3rd)	Joe Lopez‡	
1984 (4th)	Little Joe Hernandez‡	
1984 (4th)	Robert Pulido	
1984 (4th)	Joe Lopez	
1985 (5th)	Roberto Pulido‡	
1986 (6th)	Oscar Gonzalez‡	
1987 (7th)	Ram Herrera‡	
1988 (8th)	Ram Herrera‡	
1989 (9th)	Joe Lopez‡	
1990 (10th)	David Marez‡	
1990 (10th)	Joe Lopez	
1990 (10th)	Ram Herrera	
1990 (10th)	Emilio Navaira	
1990 (10th)	Oscar Gonzales	
1990 (10th)	Ruben Ramos	
1990 (10th)	Adalberto	
1990 (10th)	Joe Pasado	
1990 (10th)	Tony Guerrero	
1990 (10th)	Roberto Pulido	
1990 (10th)	Oskar S. Gonzalez	
1991 (11th)	Joe Lopez‡	
1991 (11th)	Oscar Gonzales	
1991 (11th)	Emilio Navaira	
1992 (12th)	Joe Lopez‡	
1992 (12th)	Oscar Gonzales	
1992 (12th)	Emilio Navaira	
1993 (13th)	David Marez‡	
1993 (13th)	Joe Lopez	
1993 (13th)	Emilio Navaira	
1993 (13th)	David Lee Garza	
1993 (13th)	Jay Perez	
1994 (14th)	Emilio Navaira‡	
1994 (14th)	Garry Hobbs	
1994 (14th)	Joe Lopez	
1995 (15th)	Emilio Navaira‡	
1995 (15th)	Jay Perez	
1995 (15th)	Joe Lopez	
1996 (16th)	Emilio Navaira‡	
1996 (16th)	Adalberto	
1996 (16th)	Gary Hobbs	
1996 (16th)	Gavino	
1996 (16th)	Hugo Guerrero	
1996 (16th)	Jay Perez	
1996 (16th)	Joe Lopez	
1996 (16th)	Michael Salgado	
1996 (16th)	Pete Astudillo	
1996 (16th)	Ram Herrera	
1996 (16th)	Ricardo Castillon	
1996 (16th)	Ricky Martinez	
1997 (17th)	Michael Salgado‡	
1997 (17th)	Jay Perez	
1997 (17th)	Pete Astudillo	
1998 (18th)	Bobby Pulido‡	
1998 (18th)	Pete Astudillo	
1998 (18th)	Emilio Navaira	
1999 (19th)	Michael Salgado‡	
1999 (19th)	Jay Perez	
1999 (19th)	Bobby Pulido	
2000 (20th)	Jay Perez‡	
2000 (20th)	Michael Salgado	
2000 (20th)	Ricky Munoz	
2001 (21st)	Jay Perez‡	
2002 (22nd)	Jimmy Gonzalez‡	
2002 (22nd)	Jay Perez	
2002 (22nd)	Bobby Pulido	
2003 (23rd)	Jay Perez‡	
2003 (23rd)	Bobby Pulido	
2003 (23rd)	Jimmy Gonzalez	
2003 (23rd)	Ram Herrera	
2003 (23rd)	Ruben Ramos	
2004 (24th)	Jay Perez‡	
2005 (25th)	Jay Perez‡	
2005 (25th)	Art Tijerina	
2005 (25th)	Ben De León	
2005 (25th)	Carlos Maldonado	
2005 (25th)	Chente Barrera	
2005 (25th)	David Márez	
2005 (25th)	DJ Kane	
2005 (25th)	Felipe Muñoz	
2005 (25th)	Jesse Marroquin	
2005 (25th)	Jonny Martinez	
2005 (25th)	Mark Ledesma	
2005 (25th)	Ram Herrera	
2006 (26th)	Jay Perez‡	
2006 (26th)	Adalberto Gallegos	
2006 (26th)	Gary Hobbs	
2006 (26th)	Jimmy Gonzalez	
2006 (26th)	Michael Salgado	
2007 (27th)	Jay Perez‡	
2007 (27th)	Gary Hobbs	
2007 (27th)	Jimmy Gonzalez	
2007 (27th)	John Hernandez	
2007 (27th)	Ram Herrera	
2007 (27th)	David Mares	
2008 (28th)	Jay Perez‡	
2009 (29th)	Jay Perez‡	
2009 (29th)	Emilio Navaira	
2009 (29th)	Javier Galvan	
2009 (29th)	Jimmy Gonzalez	
2009 (29th)	Ruben Ramos	
2010 (30th)	Jay Perez‡	
2010 (30th)	Jimmy Gonzalez	
2010 (30th)	Michael Salgado	
2010 (30th)	Ruben Ramos	
2010 (30th)	Sunny Sauceda	
2011 (31st)	Jesse Turner‡	
2011 (31st)	Bobby Pulido	
2011 (31st)	Elias Arredondo	
2011 (31st)	Gary Hobbs	
2011 (31st)	Jay Perez	
2012 (32nd)	Jesse Turner‡	
2012 (32nd)	Michael Salgado	
2012 (32nd)	Jimmy González	
2012 (32nd)	Jay Perez	
2013 (33rd)	Ricky Valenz‡	
2013 (33rd)	Jay Perez	
2013 (33rd)	Jesse Turner	
2013 (33rd)	Ram Herrera	
2013 (33rd)	Ricardo Castillon	
2014 (34th)	Jimmy Gonzalez‡	
2014 (34th)	Bobby Pulido	
2014 (34th)	Gary Hobbs	
2014 (34th)	Ricky Valenz	
2014 (34th)	Ruben Ramos	
2015 (35th)	Jesse Turner‡	
2015 (35th)	AJ Castillo	
2015 (35th)	Jimmy Gonzalez	
2015 (35th)	Lucky Joe	
2015 (35th)	Michael Salgado	
2016 (36th)	Michael Salgado‡	
2016 (36th)	Jaime De Anda	
2016 (36th)	Ram Herrera	
2016 (36th)	Ricky Valenz	
2016 (36th)	Ruben Ramos	
2017 (37th)	Jay Perez‡	
2017 (37th)	David Farias	
2017 (37th)	Gary Hobbs	
2017 (37th)	Jimmy Gonzalez	
2017 (37th)	Tony Guerrero	
2018 (38th)	Art Tigerina‡	
2018 (38th)	Jesse Villarreal	
2018 (38th)	Rodrigo Navaira	
2018 (38th)	Ruben Naranjo III	
2018 (38th)	Sunny Sauceda	
2019 (39th)	Lucky Joe‡	
2019 (39th)	Carlos Rodriquez	
2019 (39th)	J Angel Cantu	
2019 (39th)	Jimmy Gonzalez	
2019 (39th)	Michael Salgado	
2020 (40th)	Jay Perez‡	
2020 (40th)	Gary Hobbs	
2020 (40th)	James Arreola	
2020 (40th)	Leonel Correa, Jr.	
2020 (40th)	Stevie D	
2021 (41st)	Stevie D‡	
2021 (41st)	Eddie Jimenez of Da Krazy Pimpz	
2021 (41st)	Ismael Gutierrez	
2021 (41st)	Jimmy Lee	
2021 (41st)	Jonny Martinez	
2022 (42nd)	Jay Perez‡	
2022 (42nd)	David Farias	
2022 (42nd)	Gabe Rivera of Texas Latino	
2022 (42nd)	J Angle Cantu of La Fiebre	
2022 (42nd)	Lucky Joe	
2023 (43rd)	Jesse Turner ‡ of Siggno	
2023 (43rd)	Elias Arredondo of The Homeboyz	
2023 (43rd)	Emanuel J	
2023 (43rd)	Joe Lopez	
2023 (43rd)	Ricardo Castillon	
2024 (44th)	Jay Perez ‡	
2024 (44th)	Gabe Rivera of Texas Latino	
2024 (44th)	Gary Hobbs	
2024 (44th)	James Arreola of Los Palominos	
2024 (44th)	Lucky Joe	
2025 (45th)	Gabe Rivera‡ of Texas Latino	
2025 (45th)	David Lee Rodriquez	
2025 (45th)	Lucky Joe	
2025 (45th)	Leonel Correa Jr. of La Calma	
2025 (45th)	Pio Treviño	

== Notes ==
- San Miguel, Guadalupe (2002). Tejano Proud: Tex-Mex Music in the Twentieth Century. Texas A&M University Press. ISBN 1585441880. - Read online, registration required
- Burr, Ramiro (1999a). The Billboard Guide to Tejano and Regional Mexican Music. Billboard books. ISBN 0823076911.
