= 1997 Tejano Music Awards =

17th Tejano Music Awards
- Date: March 1, 1997
- Location: Alamodome, San Antonio, Texas
- Hosted by: Paul Rodríguez
- Website: tejanomusicawards.com

Television/radio coverage
- Produced by: Texas Talent Musicians Association

The 17th Tejano Music Awards were held on March 1, 1997, and aired on television on April 30, 1997. They recognized accomplishments by musicians from the previous year. The Tejano Music Awards is an annual awards ceremony recognizing Tejano musicians.

The Hometown Boys entered the awards ceremony with five nominations. Juan P. Moreno had ten nominations.

The awards ceremony took place at the Alamodome with performances from Emilio; Ruben and Alfonso Ramos; Jay Pérez; Elida Reyna; Nydia Rojas; Ricardo Castillon; Michael Salgado; Elsa Garcia; Gary Hobbs; Jennifer y Los Jetz; and Patsy Torres. Paul Rodriguez hosted the show. An audience of more than 30,000 people viewed the awards live, with awards presented by Rudy R. Treviño, Oscar G., Miss San Antonio, and Ram Herrera.

== Awards ==
There were 29 categories included in the 1997 awards ceremony.

=== Artists ===
Male Entertainer of the Year: Emilio	Male Vocalist of the Year: Michael Salgado
Female Entertainer of the Year: Jennifer Peña	Female Vocalist of the Year: Selena Quintanilla-Pérez
Most Promising Band of the Year: Bobby Pulido	Showband of the Year: La Tropa F
Vocal Duo of the Year: Emilio and Raúl Navaira	Best Tejano Musician (Bass) - tie: Noe Hernández (Elida y Avante); Roy Ramos (Ruben Ramos)
Best Tejano Musician (Drums): Enrique "Rick" Reyes (Ruben Ramos)	Best Tejano Musician (Guitar): Jimmy González (Mazz)
Best Tejano Musician (Keyboards): Brando Mireles (Brando)	Best Tejano Musician (Horn): Jonas Quintanilla (Brando)
Best Tejano Musician (Accordian): David Lee Garza	Best Tejano Musician (Bajo sexto): Juan P. Moreno
New Artist Rising Star, Male - tie: Bobby Pulido; Eddie Gonzales	New Artist Rising Star, Female: Elida Reyna
New Artist Rising Star, Group: Eddie Gonzales y Grupo Vida	Songwriter of the Year: Humberto Ramón
Tejano International: Selena Quintanilla-Pérez

=== Albums ===
Album of the Year – Orchestra: Como Te Extraño – Pete Astudillo	Album of the Year – Progressive: A Un Nuevo Nivel – La Tropa F
Album of the Year – Traditional: En Concierto – Michael Salgado	Album of the Year – Overall: Como Te Extraño – Pete Astudillo
Record Producer of the Year: A.B. Quintanilla III

=== Songs and Videos ===
Song of the Year: "Siempre Hace Frio" – Selena Quintanilla-Pérez	Tejano Country Song of the Year: "Mi Vida Eres Tu" – Rick Treviño
Instrumental of the Year: "Joe's Special #10" – Hometown Boys	Best Tejano Crossover Song: "No Quiero Saber" – Selena y Los Dinos
Video of the Year – tie: "Hay Unos Ojos" – Nydia Rojas and Ricardo Castillon (duet) (produced by Emilliano Chaparro and Benny Corral); "Paloma Negra" – Ruben Ramos (produced by Ray Valadez)
