= Hometown Boys =

Hometown Boys may refer to:

- Hometown Boys, band formed by Clayton McMichen in 1918
- Hometown Boys (Tejano band)
