= 2025 Tejano Music Awards =

American award ceremony

45th Annual Tejano Music Awards
- Date: November 21, 2025
- Location: Texas Rodeo Saloon, Katy, Texas
- Country: United States
- Hosted by: Alex Reymundo

Highlights
- Most awards: Monica Saldivar (3)
- Most nominations: Stefani Montiel (4); Monica Saldivar (4)
- Website: tejanomusicawards.com

The 45th Annual Tejano Music Awards ceremony was held on November 21, 2025 at the Texas Rodeo Saloon in Katy, Texas. Bino Gaona, the organizer for the program, said that staying in San Antonio wasn't viable if the show were to continue, saying it might have caused them to fall into bankruptcy, thus the move to the Houston area. The venue has a seating capacity around 2,200, and table space sold out within 72 hours, before a lineup of performers had even been announced.

The Texas Talent Musicians Association signed Alex Reymundo to host the event. Performers were announced in stages, beginning on October 7, 2025 through November 4, 2025, and included Lucky Joe, Da Krazy Pimpz, David Olivarez, The Homeboyz, El Plan, Ram Herrera, Monica Saldivar, Avizo, Johnny Hernandez, Grupo Solido, Ricardo Castillon y La Diferenzia, and Max Baca & Los Texmaniacs. A fan zone was held outside the venue beginning at 4:00 PM, a red carpet event was held from 5:00 PM to 6:30 PM, with the awards ceremony and performances beginning at 7:00 PM. Avizo was scheduled as the opening act. Best New Female Artist nominee Veronica La Consentida gave a performance on the red carpet.

Max Baca & Los Texmaniacs gave a tribute performance for Flaco Jiménez, with Chingo Bling and Art Tigerina listed as special guests. Both a party and a dance were held after the ceremony.

A new category was announced for the 2025 awards: Country Song of the Year. Stefani Montiel and Monica Saldivar led the nominations with four each. Both Johnny Hernandez and Ram Herrera were honored with Lifetime Achievement Awards.

== Awards ==
Winners are listed first, highlighted in boldface, and indicated with a double dagger (‡).

**Male Vocalist of the Year**: **Gabe Rivera** ‡ of Texas Latino; David Lee Rodriquez; Lucky Joe; Leonel Correa Jr. of La Calma; Pio Treviño	**Female Vocalist of the Year**: **Monica Saldivar** ‡; Angelica Alcoser; Stefani Montiel
**Best New Artist – Male**: **Luis AG** ‡; Gilbert Zamora; Jr. Reyna, Jr. Reyna Y Elegido	**Best New Artist – Female**: **Jenny B** ‡; Devin Banda; Veronica La Consentida
**Best New Artist – Group**: **Luis AG & Oros Band** ‡; Jr. Reyna Y Elegido	**Entertainer of the Year**: **Ricardo Castillon** ‡
**Album of the Year – Tejano**: **Texas Latino Volumen II** – **Texas Latino** ‡; III – Monica Saldivar; Mi Vida – David Lee Rodriquez y Cuatro11; Mis Favoritas Vol. II –Stefani Montiel; Simplemente Mejor – Pio Treviño	**Album of the Year – Conjunto**: **Showtime** – **Da Krazy Pimpz** ‡; Capitulo IV – Michael Longoria y Conjunto Jamm; La Colección de la Serie Roja – Grupo Vidal; La Nueva Etapa – Los Hermanos Peña; Míranos Ahora – The Tejano Boys
**Song of the Year**: **"Tumba Falsa"** – **Teodoro Bello Jaimes**, **Lucky Joe** ‡; "Amor Eterno" – JR Moreno, Angélica y Grupo Moneda; "Incompetente En El Amor" – Oscar Antonio Rosas Rodríguez and Leopoldo Zúñiga Cano, Jay Pérez; "Nada" – Gabriel Zavala, Joel Rosario, Stefani Montiel; "Ya Lo Sé Que Tú Te Vas" – Alberto Aguilera Valadez, Monica Saldivar	**Collaboration of the Year**: **"Pienso En Ti"** – **Texas Latino and Monica Saldivar** ‡; "Aquí Estoy Yo" – Los Hermanos Peña and Mike Aguilar Jr.; "Como Vivir Sin Ti" – David Lee Rodriquez and Shelly Lares; "No Me Queda Claro" – Pio Treviño y Majic and David Lee Garza; "Si Quieres Ver Mi Llora" – Stefani Montiel and BenitO°
**Country Song of the Year**: **"He Stopped Loving Her Today"** – **Jukebox Preachers, featuring Art Tigerina** ‡; "My Lonely Days Are Gone (’Cause I Started Drinkin’)" – David Lee Rodriquez y Cuatro11; "One More Day (Spanish)" – Grupo Vidal; "Para Toda La Vida" – Joey Martinez y Miradas; "Whiskey Texas" – Bobby Aguilera	**Video of the Year**: **"Ya Lo Sé Que Tú Te Vas"** – **Monica Saldivar** ‡
**Lifetime Achievement Award**: **Johnny Hernandez** ‡; **Ram Herrera** ‡
