= Las 3 Divas =

Studio album by Las 3 Divas
- Released: September 27, 2005
- Recorded: 2005 - Melody Ranch, San Antonio, TX
- Genre: Tejano
- Length: 35:00
- Label: Tejas Records
- Producers: Shelly Lares, Elida Reyna, Chris Lieck, Brad Green, Gabriel Zavala, Chris Lieck, John Whipple, Rogelio Zavala Jr

Las 3 Divas (English: The 3 Divas) is the debut and sole studio album by American Tejano trio Las 3 Divas. The album was released in September 2005 by Tejas Records. Las 3 Divas is a commercial collaboration between female Tejano stars Elida Reyna, Shelly Lares, and Stefani Montiel. This album earned rave reviews, plenty of radio airtime and critical acclaim even winning "Show Band of The Year". This album spawned the hit "La Cumbia Del Oeste". This album is the only time these three performers have collaborated because each has successful solo careers. It was nominated for a Grammy Award for Best Mexican/Mexican-American Album.

== Background ==
Elida Reyna, Shelly Lares, and Stefani Montiel all had successful solo careers prior to forming Las 3 Divas. They were asked to perform a tribute piece together to honor the late Tejano powerhouse Laura Canales at the Tejano National Convention in August 2005. Their performance was such a success, that they decided it was time to officially join forces and record an album together. On Sep 27, 2005, Las 3 Divas released their self-titled album. It is their first and only album, it featured both single and trio performances by the artists. The first single from their album “La Cumbia Del Oeste” became a number one hit on Texas Latin radio stations. Later that year, Las 3 Divas went on a 21-day tour overseas to entertain the troops. The "Armed Forces Entertainment Tour" began on September 27, 2005 and ended on October 17, 2005.

== Track listing ==
1. "Hey Boy"
2. "La Vida Es un Carnaval"
3. "Al Ver Que Te Vas"
4. "Es La Cumbia"
5. "Ese Hombre"
6. "Bad Girl"
7. "Slip-N-Slide"
8. "Agua Dulce"
9. "Closer"
10. "La Cumbia del Oeste"

== Personnel ==
Main Performers

- Elida Reyna- Vocals
- Shelly Lares- Vocals
- Stefani Montiel - Vocals

Additional personnel

- Joe Reyes - guitar
- Adrian Rodriguez - electric guitar, bajo sexto
- Julián Rodríguez - accordion
- José Macias - accordion
- GabeReal - accordion, keyboards, bass
- J.J. Reyes - keyboards, sequencer
- Casey Palma - drums
- Armando Aussenac - drums
- Lauro Torres - percussion

Production

- Producers: Shelly Lares, Elida Reyna, Chris Lieck, Brad Green, Gabriel Zavala, Chris Lieck, John Whipple
- Engineer: Brad Green
- Audio Mixers: Chris Lieck, Brad Green, Gabriel Zavala.
- Arrangers: Chris Lieck, Elida Reyna, Gabriel Zavala
