= Tejano Music Award for Best New Artist =

American music award

- Awarded for: Emerging vocalists and groups in Tejano music
- Country: United States
- Presented by: Texas Talent Musician Association
- First award: 2009
- Currently held by: Luis AG (Male 2025); Jenny B (Female 2025); Luis AG & Oros Band (Group 2025)
- Website: Tejanomusicawards.com

The Tejano Music Award for Best New Artist is an honor presented annually at the Tejano Music Awards, a ceremony that recognizes emerging vocalists and groups in the Tejano music industry. The award is given out in three subcategories: Male, Female, and Group.

Tristan Ramos, who won Best New Male Artist in 2019 at the age of 13, became one of the youngest recipients of a Tejano Music Award since its inception in 1981. Mia, who won Best New Female Artist in 2018 at the age of 11, is the youngest recipient of any Tejano Music Award. Mia had broken the record for the youngest winner one year after Isabel Marie Sanchez held the title in 2017.

== Recipients ==
=== Best New Artist — Male ===
Year	Winner	Nominees
2009	Eddie Guerrero	Juaquin Cura (of Los Curita's)
2010	AJ Castillo	Benny Rodriguez (of Grupo XS)
2011	Javier Hinojosa (of Texas Legend)	Lonnie Gonzalez (of Los Badd Boyzz del Valle); Carlos Gonzalez (of Los Badd Boyzz del Valle)
2012	Ricky Valenz	Smiley Cuellar
2013	Gabriel Zavala	
2014	Lucky Joe	Angel Gonzalez; Dwayne Verheyden; Frankie Caballero Jr.; Rey Reyna
2015	Juan Jose Rodriguez (of Bajo Zero)	Mario Barajas (of Baraje de Oro); Roel Nava; Severo Martinez (of Severo y Grupo Fuego); Teddy Martinez (of Teddy Martinez y Grupo Oro)
2016	Rigo Navaira (of Remedio)	J.R. Reyna (of J.R. Reyna y Grupo Eligido); Navor "Fonzie" Romo (of Grupo Romo); Roy Garcia; Sergio "Chex" Lozano (of Revo Live Band)
2017	Ben Ozuna	Kid Zapper; Jess Lopez; Mario Macias; Ricky Lopez (of Dezigual); Ruben Garza (of La Nueva Era)
2018	Stevie D. (of Stevie D & The All-Star Cast)	Oscar Nino (of Vizion); Rick Fuentes; Ruben Vela Jr.; Tony "Tigre" Saenz
2019	Tristan Ramos	Daniel Lopez (of Daniel Lopez y Grupo Aventura); Isamel Gutierrez (of Ismael Gutierrez y Su Pasion del Norte); Ray Ray (of Ray Ray de Los Agues); Ricky Guzman III (of Ricky Guzman and the All Stars)
2020	J.R. Gomez	David Lee Rodriguez; Ismael Gutierrez; Javi Guerra; Vidal Gomez
2021	Emanuel J	Juan Carlos Pena; Marcus Daniels; Ray Ray; Rene Rodriguez
2022	Elias Arredondo of The Homeboyz	Bobby “Cricket” Aguilera; JC Hernandez; Joe Villanueva; Jordan Rodriguez of Asalto
2023	Leeroy Camarillo of Magnifico 7	Hernan Hernandez, Jr of Suenatron; Javier Soliz; Joe Lara; Rocky Beltran of Mike Gonzalez & The Iconiczz
2024	Joey Martinez	George Salazar; Joe Villanueva of Tejano Bluesman Y La Nueva Onda; JR Reyna of JR Reyna y Elegido; Sergio “Chex” Lozano of Revo Live Band
2025	Luis AG	Gilbert Zamora; Jr. Reyna, Jr. Reyna Y Elegido

=== Best New Artist — Female ===
Year	Winner	Nominees
2009	Monica Castro	
2010	Veronica Sustaita (of Veronica Sustaita y Avance)	
2011	Betty Barajas (of Baraja de Oro)	
2012	Jessica Sanchez	
2013	Cacy Zavala	
2014	Crystal Torres	Laura McGill; Lisa Mar; Savannah; Silvia Navarro; Veronique Medrano
2015	Yvone Ramos (of Yvone Ramos y Grupo Fuego)	Angelique (of Angelique & the Sweet City Band); Di Marie; Elena Betancourt (of Elena 7 Los Tejano Ryderz); Silvia Navarro (of Grupo Imagen)
2016	Destiny Navaira (of Remedio)	Erika Santana; La Peligrosa; Megan Chapa; Tanya Griego
2017	Isabel Marie Sanchez	Bree Jimenez; Cindy Ramos; Madalyn Hernandez; Veronique Medrano
2018	Mia	Annie Lomeli; Devin Banda; Di Marie; Sarah Monique
2019	Angelique (of Angelique & the Sweet City Band)	Aisha; Liz Garcia; Sarah Monique; Veronique Medrano
2020	Monica Saldivar	Brenda Martinez; Cindy Ramos; Magali Delarosa
2021	Liz Garcia	Shevie Love
2022	Angelica Alcoser	Celestina Robles; Cynthia Bustamante; Gabriella Salazar; Lydia Castillo
2023	Di Marie (of Mike Gonzalez & The Iconiczz)	Hilda Lamas; Laura Denisse; Madison Pulido
2024	Gabriella Martinez	Joanna Rae; Lorena Mejia; Maritza Gomez; Steffanie Martinez
2025	Jenny B	Devin Banda; Veronica La Consentida

=== Best New Artist — Group ===
Year	Winner	Nominees
2009	Grupo Sueno	
2010	Veronica Sustaita y Avance	
2011	Badd Boyz del Valle	
2012	Tejano Highway 281	
2013	La Calma	
2014	Dwayne & The Tex Mexplosion	Grupo Imagen; Grupo Vidal; Marcos G. Orosco y Extremo; Zamorales
2015	Grupo Imagen	Bajo Zero; Evolucion; Vision; Yvonne y Grupo Fuego
2016	Remedio	J.R. Reyna y Grupo Elegido; Los R.V. Boys; Revo Live Band; Sabor Latino Legacy
2017	Dezigual	Magnifico 7; Ruben Garza Y La Nueva Era; Veronique Medrand & The Puro Party Band; Xplosion
2018	Rick Fuentes and the Brown Express	Devin Banda & The Band; La Soledad; Stevie D & The All-Star Cast; The Monterrey Project
2019	Angelique & the Sweet City Band	Daniel Lopez Y Grupo Aventura; Ricky Guzman and The Allstars; Tristan Ramos and The Band; Veronique and The Puro Party Band
2020	J.R. Gomez y Los Conjunto Bandits	Ismael Gutierrez Y Su Pasion Del Norte; Kompleto; Monica Saldivar and The Band
2021	South Texas Homies	El Dorado Band; La 45; Los D Boyz; Marcus Daniels Y Algo Suave
2022	The Homeboyz	Asalto; Lydia Castillo and The Band; Magnifico 7; Zenzio
2023	Mike Gonzalez & The Iconiczz	Joe Lara Y Grupo Xprezzion; Jr Reyna Y Elegido; Laura Denisse Y Los Brillantes
2024	Joey Martinez Y Miradas	JR Reyna Y Elegido; Los Estrellas de Oro; Revo Live Band; Tejano Bluesman Y La Nueva Onda
2025	Luis AG & Oros Band	Jr. Reyna Y Elegido

== See also ==
- Music of Texas

== Works cited ==
- "Perez, Reyna Win Tejano Vocal Awards". The Brownsville Herald. July 13, 2010 – via Newspapers.com.
- Nick, Stacy (April 30, 2009). "Teen Idols". Fort Collins Coloradoan – via Newspapers.com.
- Kramer, Ariana (July 19, 2012). "Carino y Sabor". The Taos News – via Newspapers.com.
- Silva, Julie (August 18, 2012). "Refugio Tejano Musician Gets Award Nomination". Corpus Christi Caller-Times – via Newspapers.com.
- Martinez, Eduardo (July 26, 2013). "Regional Ramblings". The Monitor – via Newspapers.com.
- Martinez, Eduardo (January 23, 2015). "Regional Ramblings". The Monitor – via Newspapers.com.
- "Los Badd Boyz del Valle And the Kikker Daddy Legacy to Perform at Texas Cook'em: High Steaks in Edinburg". The Monitor. June 15, 2014 – via Newspapers.com.
- Timmons, Eric (September 20, 2015). "Dozens Volunteered to Help Raise Funds for Scholarships". The Rock Island Argus – via Newspapers.com.
- Garcia, Raul (September 28, 2017). "Local Music Benefit to Help With Harvey Relief". The Brownsville Herald – via Newspapers.com.
- "Brownsville Native Stevie D to be Featured at San Antonio's Fan Fair". The Monitor. March 15, 2019 – via Newspapers.com.
- Wilson, Matt (November 4, 2021). "McAllen Music Teacher Finalist for Tejano Music Award". The Monitor – via Newspapers.com.
- Medina, John Henry. "41st Tejano Music Awards filled with past performances, music videos, while announcing winners during virtual event". Tejano Nation.
- Medina, John Henry. "Shelly Lares, Jay Perez, Stevie D, and JR Gomez top winners at 40th annual Tejano Music Awards featuring virtual performances". Tejano Nation.
- Carrizales, Sylvia M. "39th annual Tejano Music Awards filled with memorable performances". Tejano Nation.
- Carrizales, Sylvia M. "Anjelique, Tristan Ramos win Best New Artists at 2019 TMAs". Tejano Nation.
- Medina, John Henry. "Elida Reyna adds to record-setting total, Mia becomes youngest winner at 38th TMAs". Tejano Nation.
- Medina, John Henry. "Jay Perez, Stefani Montiel take top honors at 37th Tejano Music Awards". Tejano Nation.
- "Elida Reyna, Michael Salgado & Remedio win big at 2016 Tejano Music Awards". Tejano Nation.
- "2015 Tejano Music Awards Winners – Full List". Tejano Nation.
- Medina, John Henry (November 28, 2022). "Jay Perez and Shelly Lares take top honors at 42nd Tejano Music Awards – Full Winners List". Tejano Nation. Archived from the original on November 28, 2022.
- Medina, John Henry (October 21, 2023). "43rd Tejano Music Awards: Siggno, Mike Gonzalez & The Iconiczz among big winners". Tejano Nation. Archived from the original on October 30, 2023.
- Medina, John Henry (November 22, 2024). "44th Annual Tejano Music Awards Winners — Full List". Tejano Nation. Archived from the original on January 14, 2025.
- Medina, John Henry (November 22, 2025). "45th Tejano Music Awards Shine Spotlight on Next-Generation Stars at New Katy Venue". Tejano Nation. Archived from the original on November 24, 2025.
- Saldana, Hector (September 9, 2014). "Who will win this year's Tejano Music Awards?". My San Antonio. Archived from the original on September 11, 2014.
