= Tejano Music Award for Album of the Year – Conjunto =

Annual music award

- Current: 2016 Tejano Music Awards
- Awarded for: Conjunto Album of the Year
- Country: United States
- Presented by: Local television and radio stations
- First award: 1981
- Currently held by: Hometown Boys (2015)

Highlights
- Most awards: Hometown Boys and David Lee Garza (tie at 5)
- Website: Tejano Music Awards

The Tejano Music Award for Album of the Year – Conjunto (formerly the Tejano Music Award for Album of the Year – Conjunto/Traditional from the 11th and 12th awards ceremony) is an honor presented annually by the Texas Talent Musicians Association (TTMA). Musicians nominated for this category are performers of the conjunto style of Tejano music.

Current holder, the Hometown Boys are tied with David Lee Garza for most wins at five. While Elida Reyna remains the only female musician to have won the award, Linda Escobar has been the most nominated female singer with three nominations.

== Recipients ==
| Year | Performing artist(s) | Work | Nominees | Ref. |
|---|---|---|---|---|
| 1981 | Los Dos Gilbertos | Por Una Mala Mujer | | |
| 1982 | Los Dos Gilbertos | Querida Reynosa | | |
| 1983 | Ramón Ayala | Mi Golondrina | | |
| 1984 | David Lee Garza | Especialmente Para Ti | Ramon Ayala – Una Carta; Direccion – Sha Na Na | |
| 1985 | David Lee Garza | David Lee Garza y Los Musicales | | |
| 1986 | Ramon Ayala | Un Rinconcito En El Cielo | | |
| 1987 | David Lee Garza | Cuantas Veces | | |
| 1988 | David Lee Garza | Dejame Quererte | | |
| 1989 | David Lee Garza | Tour 88 | | |
| 1990 | Emilio Navaira | Emilio | | |
| 1991 | Emilio Navaira | Sensaciones | David Lee Garza – El Que Mas Te Ha Querido; Roberto Pulido – Nuevos Caminos; Adalberto – Menace; Texas Tornados – Texas Tornados; Los Chamacos – Mi Munequita; Esteban Jordan – Temblor de San Francisco | |
| 1992 | Emilio Navaira | Shoot It | Ramon Ayala – Mi Acordion y Yo; Los Dos Gilbertos – Viva La Paz Tengo Nuevo Amor; Los Aguilares – Los Aguilares | |
| 1993–1999 | Not awarded | | | |
| 2000 | Intocable | Contigo | Michael Salgado – Otra Vez a La Cantina; Los Palominos – Por Eso Te Amo | |
| 2001 | Los Garcia Bros | Los Garcia Bros | | |
| 2002 | Los Garcia Bros | La Rayita | Ramon Ayala – Live; Hometown Boys – Señora Tentacion | |
| 2003 | Hometown Boys | A Mi La Cula | Los Chamacos – Conjunto Power; Los Garcia Bros – Electric Pachuco; Tejano Boys – No Seas Mala; Ricky Naranjo – V | |
| 2004–2006 | Not awarded | | | |
| 2007 | Elida Reyna | Mis Raizes | | |
| 2008 | Los Garcia Bros | Chuco's | | |
| 2009 | Los Garcia Bros | Hombre De Ti | Bronco Norteno – Bronco Norteno; Carlos y Los Cachorros – Me Duele; Da Krazy Pimpz – Pimpin' It; Linda Escobar – La Diva de Conjunto | |
| 2010 | Hometown Boys | Cargando la Bandera | No Boundaries – Conjunto Inizzio; Linda Escobar – 25 Greatest Hits; Los Texmaniacs – Borders y Bailes; Michael Salgado – Hombre Peligroso | |
| 2011 | Hometown Boys | Simplemente El Jefe | Carlos y Los Cachorros – 180; Da Krazy Pimpz – Los Reyes del Conjunto; David Farias – Seguire Mi Camino; Juan P. Moreno – Sabes Bien | |
| 2012 | Hometown Boys | Manteniendo La Promesa | Michael Salgado – No Vengo a Ver Si Puedo...Si Por Que Puedo Vengo | |
| 2013 | Los Hermanos Farias | Back on Track | Los Fantasmas del Valle – 2012; Boni Mauricio y Los Maximos – Ando Que Me Lleva; Los Garcia Brothers – Cuando Yo Te Conoci; Los Texmaniacs – Texas Sounds & Tex-Mex Sounds | |
| 2014 | Albert Zamora | Ayer y Hoy | Los Garcia Bros – La Pura Verdad; Boni Mauricio – Mis Polkas Favoritas; Los Dos Gilbertos – Puro Conjunto Carnal; La Tropa F – Reedifica Su Musica | |
| 2015 | Hometown Boys | El Siguiente Capítulo | Linda Escobar – 50th Anniversary; Los Garcia Bros – Aferrado Mi Loco; Flaco Jiménez & Max Baca – Legends & Legacies; Da Krazy Pimpz – Nadie Nos Podra Bajar | |

=== Album of the Year – Overall ===
| Year | Performing artist(s) | Work | Nominees | Ref. |
|---|---|---|---|---|
| 1996 | Selena | Dreaming of You | | |
| 1997 | Pete Astudillo | Como Te Extrano | Jennifer Pena – Dulzura; La Tropa F – A Un Nuevo Nievel | |
