= La Diferenzia =

- Origin: San Antonio, Texas, US
- Genres: Tejano music; Tejano cumbia; merengue
- Years active: 1989–1991, 1993-1999, 2010-present
- Labels: Manny Music; Arista Records; Q-Productions
- Past members: Ricardo Castillon; Miguel Spindola; Raul Arnold; Omar Cardenas; Simon Arausa; Jesse Moya; Jose Luis Benavides

La Diferenzia is an American Tejano music septet group based in San Antonio, Texas. Led by Mexican singer-songwriter Ricardo Castillon, its members included Mexican songwriter Miguel Spindola, saxophonist and keyboardist Raul Arnold, bajo sexto player Omar Cardenas, accordionist Simon Arausa, guitarist Jesse Moya, and Jose Luis Benavides on the drums. The group chose "Diferenzia" to stand out from other Tejano bands and wanted to offer a variety of musical styles. Castillon wanted to provide listeners with Tejano, mariachi, merengue, cumbia, and ballads. Ricardo and his brother, Ramiro Castillon, started La Diferenzia, recording under Manny Guerra's label in the late 1980s. Following Ramiro's death during a car accident in 1991, the group disbanded.

Ricardo returned to music and signed with Arista Records with La Diferenzia. The group released their debut self-titled album on September 13, 1994, following Artista's opening of a Texas division catering to Tejano music, becoming the first recording released under Arista Texas. La Diferenzia peaked at number six on the US Billboard Top Latin Albums chart, and number two on the Billboard Regional Mexican Albums chart. Its lead single, "Si Lo Quieres", peaked at number one on the US Radio y Musica's Tejano Singles chart, staying atop the chart for four consecutive weeks. The album contained ballads and cumbia music. La Diferenzia ranked among the most popular Latin albums in the United States in 1994, and garnered the nomination for the Grammy Award for Best Mexican/Mexican-American Album at the 37th Grammy Awards. Two of its singles, "Si Lo Quieres" and "Linda Chaparrita" peaked at number one on the Billboard Regional Mexican Songs chart and the album received a gold certification for selling 500,000 units in the United States. La Diferenzia received the award for Most Promising Band while Castillon received the Tejano Music Award for Best New Artist - Male at the 1995 Tejano Music Awards.

La Diferenzia released their second album, Fue Mucho Mas Que Amor (1996), which contained a more diverse collection of genres, ranging from cumbia to flamenco, merengue, ranchera, and R&B. The album debuted at number nine on the Top Latin Albums chart. Its single, "Tu No Tienes Corazon" peaked at number one on Radio y Musica Tejano Singles chart, while the remix of "Antonieta" reached number two on Billboard's Dance Singles Sales. Their performance at the Houston Astrodome in 1996 ganered 61,000 attendees. "Mundo Sin Guitarras" won Song of the Year at the 1998 Tejano Music Awards. By 2000, the group disbanded and Ricardo went solo, later signing to Q-Productions in 2022.

== See also ==
- List of Hispanic and Latino Americans
- Music of Texas

== Works cited ==
- Maldonado, Vilma (September 11, 1994). "Grupo Nuevo La Diferenzia Estrenara Primer Album". Corpus Christi Caller-Times.
- Weitz, Matt (October 19, 1994). "Sounds". The Chapel Hill Herald.
- Tarradell, Mario (December 29, 1994). "Some of the Most Popular Albums on the Latin Charts". Hartford Courant.
- "The 37th Grammy Nominations". Los Angeles Times. January 6, 1995.
- Jaklewicz, Greg (February 24, 1995). "Tejano Band's Success of a Diferenzia Nature". Abilene Reporter-News.
- Cortes Gonzalez, Maria (March 29, 1996). "La Diferenzia Brings Latin Music to El Paso". El Paso Times.
- "Latin Beat". San Angelo Standard-Times. November 22, 1996.
- Hurlbut, D. (March 8, 1998). "New Stars Win Tejano Music Awards". Austin American-Statesman.
- Hernandez, Anissa R. (January 18, 1999). "La Diferenzia". Corpus Christi Caller-Times.
- "Top Latin Albums > January 21, 1995". Billboard. Vol. 107, no. 3. January 21, 1995.
- San Miguel, Guadalupe (2002). Tejano proud: Tex-Mex music in the twentieth century (1st ed.). Texas A&M University Press. ISBN 9781585441884.
- Burr, Ramiro (1999). The Billboard Guide to Tejano and Regional Mexican Music (1st ed.). Billboard Books. ISBN 9780823076918.
- "Ricardo Castillon shares details on new project produced by Abraham Quintanilla". Tejano Nation. May 31, 2022.
