= Bob Grever =

American music executive

- Born: Bob Grever; 1936
- Died: August 23, 2016 (aged 79); San Antonio, Texas
- Occupation: Music Executive
- Known for: Cara Records, spearheading the 1990s Tejano music explosion

Bob Grever (1936 – August 23, 2016) was an American music executive who once owned San Antonio independent record label Cara Records. He became the "most powerful record company owner" in the state of Texas in the 1980s. Grever sold the record company and its roster of recordings as well as its Tejano music musicians to EMI Latin, spearheading the 1990s Tejano music golden age. His most notable artists include Emilio Navaira and Selena. Other musicians Grever signed were Joe Posada, David Lee Garza, Bobby Naranjo, Mazz, and La Mafia. Songwriter Luis Silva became head of promotions while working for Cara Records. Grever came from a musician family, his grandmother Maria Grever, became one of the most successful female composers. Music critic Ramiro Burr of the San Antonio Express-News called Grever "one of the two most important people in the Tejano music explosion of the 80's and 90's." After Grever sold Cara Records, he worked with the Backstreet Boys and NSYNC. He also became president of Zomba Group's Latin music division. Grever died on August 23, 2016, due to complications brought on by cancer on August 23, 2016; he was 79 years old. He was posthumously awarded at the 2016 Tejano Music Awards for Special Lifetime Achievement.
