= Siggno =

American band

- Origin: Santa Rosa, Texas, United States
- Genres: Tejano; Norteño
- Years active: 2000–present
- Labels: Crown; Sony Discos; Freddie Records; Remex Music; Martzcom Music
- Members: Jesse Turner; Joey Flores; Joseph Charles Scott; David Rosas; Jorge Torres Jr.
- Past members: Joel Castañeda; Jacob Castañeda; Julio Cesar Torres
- Website: www.gruposiggno.net

Siggno (also known as Grupo Siggno) is an American norteño/tejano band formed in Santa Rosa, in 2000. The group released their debut album Al Principio in 2001 under Crown Records. The album's release followed Tejano music's post-golden age era, where artist's music were indistinguishable from their counterparts, while album sales flattened. Music critics praised Siggno's progressive sounds and entertaining performances during their concerts. Their second album, Por Amor (2002) received a BMI Music Award and Latin Grammy Award nomination. The group's album Six Pack (2008) marked Siggno's first entry on a music chart. Their album Que Harias (2010) provided Siggno their first top 10 album on the US Billboard Regional Mexican Albums chart.

In 2013 Siggno broke a contract to perform at the quinceanera in Texas, their manager took off with all the money. The new management nor Jessie Turner refunded the money or performed. A lawsuit was filed against them and they also failed to appear in the hearing.

In 2014, En Vivo debuted and peaked at number one on the Regional Mexican Albums chart, their first number one album. In 2015, Zodiacal provided Siggno their second number one album. In February 2016, lead vocalist Jesse Turner's son Jacob was involved in a car accident that left him in a coma for four months. Following his recovery, Siggno's Yo Te Esperare (2016) debuted at number one on the Top Latin Albums chart and entered the Billboard 200. The group managed to break audience records at the Go Tejano Day annual event in 2017. They honored their performance to Jacob who continued to receive therapy. In 2018, Siggno became a spokesperson for Bud Light in the state of Texas.

== History ==
Jesse Turner attended a local church in Texas and met his future bandmates. When Turner was 10 years old his father had died and Turner spent his teenage years writing songs as a coping mechanism. Turner founded Siggno in 2000 and released their debut album Al Principio in late 2001. Al Principio failed to impact any music chart during its run. The album was released during Tejano music's post-golden age era under Crown Records. Music promoters found it challenging to shift consumers in buying regional Mexican music albums in big box retail stores as sales in Tejano music had flattened. Music journalists criticized Tejano music artists for their lack of variety in their music as well as recycling the same sound in each track. Billboard called Siggno's "Pero Hablame" as a "sentimental cumbia". The group's second album, Por Amor was released in 2002. The album helped Siggno to receive a nomination for a BMI Music Award in 2003, and a Latin Grammy Award for Best Tejano Album. Ramiro Burr of Billboard noted a sense of vulnerability and romantic themes in Siggno's repertoire which distinguished them from regional Mexican boy bands who would rather "raise hell" with their partners. Music promoters found Siggno's sound to be more progressive, but found that groups like Siggno to be more entertainers on stage than an actual performer. Another critic saw the group as a neo-norteño band that was being embraced by music fans. The group was nominated for Most Promising Band and Album of the Year at the 2003 Tejano Music Awards. Siggno released their third album Caminando under Serca Music. The following year, the band signed with Freddie Records and released Amor y Dolor which spawned their hit single "Mejor Dimelo".

Siggno's next two studio efforts Capitulo 5 (2007) and Six Pack (2008) were nominated for a Latin Grammy Award. Six Pack became the group's first recording to enter a music chart. The album peaked at number 44 on the US Billboard Top Latin Albums on the week ending July 5, 2008. The group's next recording En La Radio (2009) marked Siggno's first entry on the Billboard Regional Mexican Albums chart when it peaked at number 19. Elsewhere, En La Radio debuted and peaked at number 33 on the Top Latin Albums chart. Siggno's follow-up Que Harias (2010) peaked at number 27 on the Top Latin Albums chart and gave the group their first top 10 album on the Regional Mexican Albums chart. In 2012, Siggno released Lo Que Me Dejaste which provided the group their first top five on the Regional Mexican Albums chart when the album peaked at number four. The band's first greatest hits album Nuestra Historia (2012) and Lo Que Me Dejaste helped grow the group's touring revenues. Their concert venues began selling out as well as a number of festivals they attended throughout the United States and Mexico as their songs began receiving strong airplay. 2013's El Mundo Se Acabo became Siggno's highest-peaking album, at the time of its release, when it peaked at number four on the Top Latin Albums chart. Their live album En Vivo (2014) broke their record when it debuted and peaked at number three and debuted atop the Regional Mexican Albums chart. Siggno's following recording Zodiacal (2015) provided the band's second number one album.

In February 2016, Turner's son Jacob, was involved in a car accident that left him in a coma. Jacob suffered severe brain damage which left him in a coma for four months. A few months later, the group's album Yo Te Esperare debuted and peaked atop the Top Latin Albums (their first number one) and Regional Mexican Albums (their third number one). Turner told Billboard that the album was dedicated to his son following his recovery from the hospital. Yo Te Esperare debuted with 5,000 copies sold in its first week, debuting at number 123 on the Billboard 200 chart, their first entry. The album featured a cover of Nicky Jam and Enrique Iglesias' "El Perdon", which debuted at number eight on the Regional Mexican Digital Song Sales chart. Siggno became the ninth best-selling regional Mexican artists in 2016, while Yo Te Esperare finished as the 12th best-selling regional Mexican album of 2016.

During RodeoHouston 2017, Siggno and Banda El Recodo broke the all-time paid attendance record at Go Tejano Day when 75,557 people attended. The record was later broken by Calibre 50 the following year. At the event, Joey Guerra of Houston Chronicle found Siggno's performance to be "emotional". Turner often referenced his son Jacob during the performance. Bud Light expanded their Texas campaign and signed Siggno as their spokesperson in the state and sponsored their 100-city tour in 2018. In April 2018, Siggno visited a 5-year old fan who was diagnosed with a congenital heart defect as an infant, as part of Make-A-Wish. They invited him to their concert and performed the fan's favorite songs. The following month, Nixon High School competed to have perfect attendance to meet Siggno. The band had an open Q&A and lunch with the students who won.

== Members ==
- Jesse Turner – vocals, accordion
- Ricardo (Richard) Rosales – vocals, bajo sexto
- Ruben Robles Jr – electric bass
- Cesar (Chato) Sanchez - drums
- Jorge (George) Torres - congas, percussion
- Sergio(Checo)Tabares – MC

== Discography ==
- Al Principio (2001)
- Por Amor (2002)
- Caminando (2005)
- Amor y Dolor (2006)
- Capítulo 5 (2007)
- Six Pack (2008)
- En La Radio (2009)
- Que Harias (2010)
- Te Va a Doler (2010)
- Lo Que Me Dejaste (2011)
- El Mundo Se Acabo (2012)
- Zodiacal (2014)
- En Vivo (2014)
- Siggno de los Tiempos (2015)
- Yo Te Esperare (2016)
- Rockteño (2016)
- Monstruo (2018)
- Pelicula Vol. 1 (2020)
- su legado 1938 (2026)
