= Tejano Music Award for Male Entertainer of the Year =

History of the Tejano Annual male musical award held in Texas

- Current: 2006 Tejano Music Awards
- Awarded for: Male Entertainer of the Year
- Country: United States
- Presented by: Local television and radio stations
- First award: 1981
- Currently held by: Jay Perez (2006)

Highlights
- Most awards: Emilio Navaira (5)
- Website: Tejano Music Awards

The Tejano Music Award for Male Entertainer of the Year is an honor presented annually by the Texas Talent Musicians Association (TTMA). The Tejano Music Awards were first awarded in 1981 and was established to recognize the most talented performers of Tejano music—a subgenre of regional Mexican music. The nominees were originally selected by a voting poll conducted among program directors and disc jockeys of Spanish-language radio stations in Texas. Originally, winners were chosen by Tejano radio station KIWW listeners, and later by fans of Tejano musicians in the Southwest of the United States. Winners are selected through a survey of 50,000 Texas households with Hispanic surnames. By 1987, the award ceremony was broadcast through 32 radio stations and 25 local television channels in Texas, New Mexico, Arkansas, Oklahoma and Louisiana. The awards ceremony were originally held at the Henry B. Gonzalez Convention Center, then to the San Antonio Convention Center until 1994, and the Alamodome until 1999. As of 2015, the ceremony is held annually at the Tobin Center for the Performing Arts in San Antonio, Texas.

The award was first presented to Roberto Pulido, who introduced country music and ballads to the traditional polka and ranchera music of Tejano. Beginning in 1982, Little Joe Hernandez dominated the award for three consecutive years until La Mafia's Oscar Gonzalez won for two consecutive years in 1985. Emilio Navaira, who is called the "King of Tejano music", holds the record for most wins at five. The award was disestablished following the 2006 Tejano Music Awards along with the Tejano Music Award for Female Entertainer of the Year and were merged into Tejano Music Award for Entertainer of the Year for the 2007 awards ceremony.

== Winners and nominees ==
Listed below are the winners of the award for each year, as well as the other nominees.

Key	Meaning
‡	Indicates the winner

Year	Performer	Ref
1981 (1st)	Roberto Pulido‡	
1982 (2nd)	Little Joe Hernandez‡	
1983 (3rd)	Little Joe Hernandez‡	
1984 (4th)	Little Joe Hernandez‡	
1984 (4th)	Roberto Pulido	
1984 (4th)	Oscar Gonzalez	
1985 (5th)	Oscar Gonzalez‡	
1986 (6th)	Oscar Gonzalez‡	
1987 (7th)	Little Joe Hernandez‡	
1988 (8th)	Ramiro "Ram" Herrera‡	
1989 (9th)	Ramiro "Ram" Herrera‡	
1990 (10th)	Emilio Navaira‡	
1990 (10th)	Joe Lopez	
1990 (10th)	Ramiro "Ram" Herrera	
1990 (10th)	David Marez	
1990 (10th)	Tony Guerrero	
1990 (10th)	Roberto Pulido	
1990 (10th)	Arturo Montez	
1990 (10th)	Oscar Gonzalez	
1990 (10th)	Joe Posada	
1990 (10th)	Adalberto	
1990 (10th)	Ruben Ramos	
1990 (10th)	Oskar S. Gonzalez	
1991 (11th)	Joe Lopez‡	
1991 (11th)	Ramiro "Ram" Herrera	
1991 (11th)	Emilio Navaira	
1992 (12th)	Joe Lopez‡	
1992 (12th)	Ramiro "Ram" Herrera	
1992 (12th)	Emilio Navaira	
1993 (13th)	Emilio Navaira‡	
1993 (13th)	Dee Burleson	
1993 (13th)	Joe Lopez	
1994 (14th)	Emilio Navaira‡	
1994 (14th)	Ramiro "Ram" Herrera	
1994 (14th)	Jay Perez	
1995 (15th)	Emilio Navaira‡	
1995 (15th)	Gary Hobbs	
1995 (15th)	Jay Perez	
1996 (16th)	Emilio Navaira‡	
1996 (16th)	Roberto Pulido	
1996 (16th)	Ricky Martinez	
1996 (16th)	Ramiro "Ram" Herrera	
1996 (16th)	Pete Astudillo	
1996 (16th)	Juan P. Moreno	
1996 (16th)	Joe Lopez	
1996 (16th)	Jay Perez	
1996 (16th)	Jaime de Anda	
1996 (16th)	Gavino	
1996 (16th)	Gary Hobbs	
1996 (16th)	Dee Burleson	
1997 (17th)	Michael Salgado‡	
1997 (17th)	Emilio Navaira	
1997 (17th)	Bobby Pulido	
1998 (18th)	Bobby Pulido‡	
1999 (19th)	Bobby Pulido‡	
1999 (19th)	Michael Salgado	
1999 (19th)	Eddie Gonzalez	
2000 (20th)	Bobby Pulido‡	
2000 (20th)	Michael Salgado	
2000 (20th)	Jay Perez	
2001 (21st)	Jay Perez‡	
2002 (22nd)	Jimmy Gonzalez‡	
2002 (22nd)	Jay Perez	
2002 (22nd)	DJ Kane	
2003 (23rd)	A.B. Quintanilla‡	
2003 (23rd)	Jay Perez	
2003 (23rd)	Jimmy Garcia	
2003 (23rd)	Jimmy Gonzalez	
2003 (23rd)	Ruben Ramos	
2004 (24th)	Jay Perez‡	
2005 (25th)	Jay Perez‡	
2005 (25th)	Adalberto	
2005 (25th)	Art Tigerina	
2005 (25th)	Ben De León	
2005 (25th)	Bob Gallarza	
2005 (25th)	Chente Barrera	
2005 (25th)	DJ Kane	
2005 (25th)	Felipe Muñoz	
2005 (25th)	Jay Perez	
2005 (25th)	Jessy Serrata	
2005 (25th)	Jimmy Gonzalez	
2005 (25th)	Marcos Orozco	
2005 (25th)	Michael Salgado	
2006 (26th)	Jay Perez‡	
2006 (26th)	Art Tijerina	
2006 (26th)	DJ Kane	
2006 (26th)	Jimmy Gonzalez	
2006 (26th)	Sunny Sauceda	

== Notes ==
- San Miguel, Guadalupe (2002). Tejano Proud: Tex-Mex Music in the Twentieth Century. Texas A&M University Press. ISBN 1585441880. - Read online, registration required
- Burr, Ramiro (1999a). The Billboard Guide to Tejano and Regional Mexican Music. Billboard books. ISBN 0823076911.
