= 2015 Tejano Music Awards =

35th Tejano Music Awards
- Date: October 24, 2015
- Location: Tobin Center for the Performing Arts, San Antonio, Texas, U.S.
- Hosted by: Efrain "Happy" Guerrero

The 35th Annual Tejano Music Awards was held on October 24, 2015, at the Tobin Center for the Performing Arts in San Antonio, Texas.

The awards ceremony will be hosted by Efrain "Happy" Guerrero with performances from Tejano musicians Shelly Lares, Ruben Ramos, Hometown Boys, Isabel Marie, Emilio Navaira, Raulito Navaira, Xelencia, Las Fenix, Ricky Valenz, La Fiebre, Texadoz, Massore, David Farias, Da Krazy Pimpz, Pasty Torres, David Lee Garza, Oscar G, Aldaberto Gallegos, and Pete Astudillo. The event is expected to pay tribute to Selena, who was killed back in March 1995.

== Nominees ==
On September 5, it was announced that merengue group Grupo Fuego have been nominated for two awards. On September 23, Eagle Pass Business Journal announced several nominations for the 35th Tejano Music Awards.

Male Vocalist of the Year	Male Entertainer of the Year
La Fiebre; Grupo Fuego	La Fiebre; Grupo Fuego
Song of the Year	Vocal Duo of the Year
Oscar G featuring Aldaberto Gallegos — "Eternamente"	Oscar G featuring Aldaberto Gallegos — "Eternamente"; Da Krazy Pimpz featuring the Jimenez Brothers and Jessica Sanchez — "Nada los Podra Bajar"; Elida Reyna featuring Jay Perez — "Siempre Seras Para Mi"
Conjunto Album of the Year
Da Krazy Pimpz — Nada Los Podra Bajar; Oscar G — Back N Better; Los Garcia Brothers — Aferrado Mi Loco; Hometown Boys — El Siguiente Capitulo; Flaco Jimenez and Max Baca — Legends and Legacies
