= Stefani Montiel =

Tejano singer

- Born: December 23, 1972 (age 53); Albuquerque, New Mexico
- Genres: Tejano
- Years active: 1983–present
- Labels: EMI Latin; Sony Discos
- Spouse: Gabriel Zavala
- Website: stefanimontiel.com

Stefani Melissa Sullivan (born December 23, 1972), professionally known as Stefani Montiel is a Tejano music singer. In the early 1990s, she emerged as one of the new acts in Tejano who reinvigorated the genre. Montiel is known for her fusion of various genres into her Tejano sound.

The singer has been inducted into the Tejano Roots Hall of Fame and New Mexico Music Hall of Fame, and has been nominated for a Latin Grammy Award for Best Tejano Album. In 2006, as part of Las 3 Divas with Shelly Lares and Elida Reyna, Montiel received a nomination for a Grammy Award.

Her husband and musician, Gabriel Zavala, produces her music. Montiel released her first album at the age of nine before signing with EMI Latin and then with Sony Discos.

She is considered to be one of the most popular Tejano singers. Montiel performed at the inaugural Fiesta de la Flor in 2015. She received the Tejano Music Award for Female Vocalist of the Year, Female Entertainer of the Year, while her album, La Dueña, received the Tejano Music Award for Tejano Album of the Year at the 2017 Tejano Music Awards. Montiel has been nominated for the Tejano Music Award for Female Vocalist of the Year, Album of the Year for Amor Supernatural, Song of the Year for "La Comadre", while her collaboration with DJ Kane and Zavala on "Sol, Arena, Ron Y Mar", was nominated for Vocal Duo of the Year at the 2019 Tejano Music Awards.

Her collaboration with La Calma on "Echame La Culpa", peaked at number one on the Tejano Gold Top 20 chart. In 2020, Montiel partnered with Música Ford to bring awareness to Tejano music and its culture, becoming the first Tejano woman to partner with Ford. Her song, "Quedate Con El", received the nomination for Song of the Year at the 2022 Tejano Music Awards.

Montiel received four nominations for the 2025 Tejano Music Awards: Female Vocalist of the Year, Tejano Album of the Year for Mis Favoritas Vol. II, Song off the Year for "Nada" (with Gabriel Zavala and Joel Rosario), and Collaboration of the Year for "Si Quieres Ver Mi Llora" (with BenitO°).

== See also ==
- List of Hispanic and Latino Americans
- Music of Texas

== Works cited ==
- Medina, John Henry (February 8, 2023). "Stefani Montiel will celebrate 30 years in Tejano music with Lone Star Nights Tour 2023". Tejano Nation.
- Medrano, Veronique (May 6, 2023). "Versatility of Stefani Montiel featured on Women of Tejano Spotify Playlist". Tejano Nation.
- Medina, John Henry (September 29, 2022). "Stefani Montiel to be inducted into New Mexico Music Hall of Fame Class of 2022". Tejano Nation.
- Medina, John Henry (March 11, 2021). "Stefani Montiel showcases different style with new single 'Ya Lo Ves'". Tejano Nation.
- Medina, John Henry (September 18, 2020). "Stefani Montiel partners with Música Ford to celebrate Tejano roots". Tejano Nation.
- Medina, John Henry (October 21, 2019). "La Calma, Stefani Montiel top Tejano Gold Countdown as ladies dominate Top 10 again". Tejano Nation.
- Medina, John Henry (November 6, 2019). "Elida Reyna, Lucky Joe, Stefani Montiel lead nominations for 39th TMAs". Tejano Nation.
- Medina, John Henry (March 21, 2018). "Stefani Montiel heading back to studio for next album, new projects". Tejano Nation.
- Medina, John Henry (November 12, 2022). "Shelly Lares, Jay Perez, and Monica Saldivar lead nominations for 42nd annual Tejano Music Awards". Tejano Nation.
- Burr, Ramiro (1999). The Billboard Guide to Tejano and Regional Mexican Music (1st ed.). Billboard Books. ISBN 9780823076918.
- Guerra, Joey (January 28, 2015). "Tejano star Selena to be honored at Fiesta de la Flor". Houston Chronicle.
- Saldana, Hector (September 24, 2014). "Latin Grammy nominations over the years". San Antonio Express-News.
- Guerra, Joey (November 22, 2025). "Tejano Music Awards winners: Monica Saldívar, Luis AG and Texas Latino lead the pack in Houston". Houston Chronicle.
- Medina, John Henry (November 22, 2025). "45th Tejano Music Awards Shine Spotlight on Next-Generation Stars at New Katy Venue". Tejano Nation. Archived from the original on November 22, 2025.
