= La Tropa F =

La Tropa F is a Tejano music group from San Antonio, Texas. Originally named Los Hermanos Farias, the group changed its name to La Tropa F in the 1990s. In 1993, the group won the Tejano Music Award for Best Album of the Year with Right On Track.

== Members ==
- Jesse Farias, Jr.: lead vocals
- Jaime Farias: Keyboards, accordion
- Joe Farias: bajo sexto
- Jesse Farias: bass guitar
- Anthony Farias: percussion, keyboards
- Santos Aguilar: Drums
