= Port San Antonio =

Business park in Texas, USA

Coordinates: 29°23′3.22″N 98°34′52.2″W

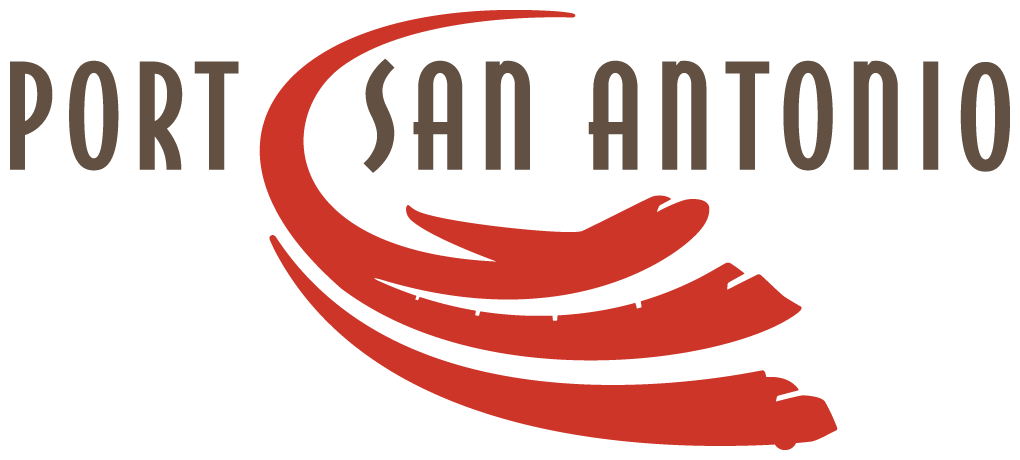

The Port Authority of San Antonio (doing business as Port San Antonio) is a public entity created to redevelop some of the land formerly occupied by Kelly Air Force Base in San Antonio, Texas.

Over 80 tenant customers lease facilities on the 1,900-acre campus and employ nearly 16,000 people, generating approximately $5.6 billion in annual economic activity for the region. Aerospace, logistics and manufacturing are longstanding industries on the site. In the last decade, several cybersecurity, robotics, space-based manufacturing, automotive and other advanced technology entities have launched operations at the site. As the home for the San Antonio Museum of Science and Technology (SAMSAT), the Port is also a hub for several STEM/STEAM-based educational programs serving schools throughout the region.

== History ==
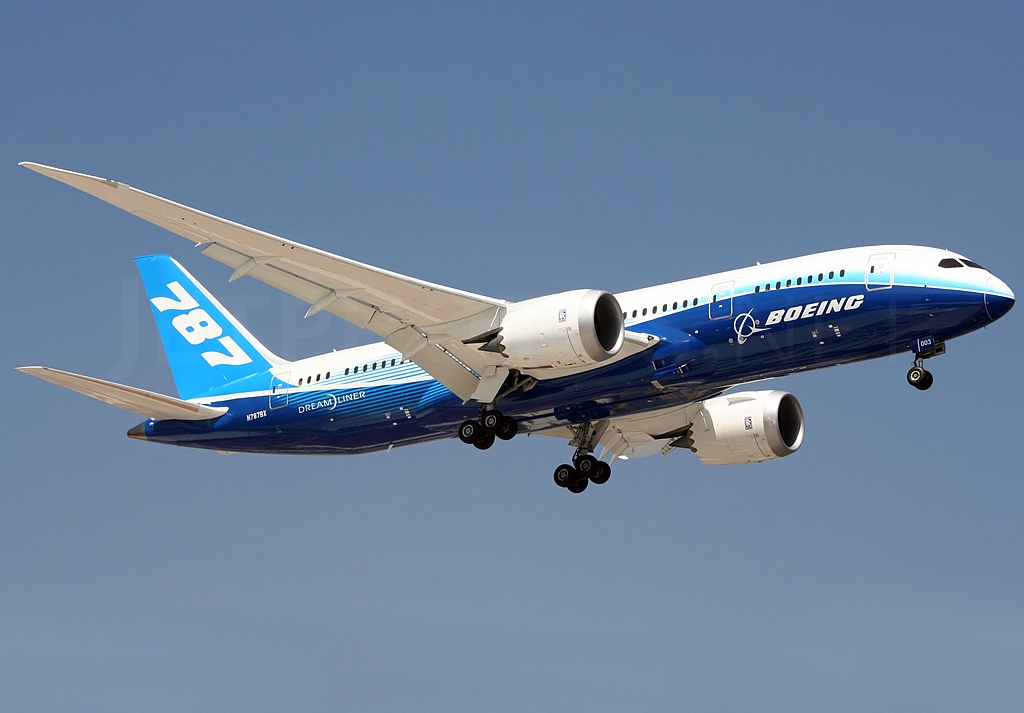
Boeing 787 Dreamliner

The closure of Kelly AFB resulted from the U.S. Department of Defense’s 1995 Base Closure and Realignment (BRAC) initiative. The base, which was first established in 1917 as Kelly Field, formally closed in August 2001.

As realignment and closure of the Kelly assets began to occur between 1995 and 2001, the Greater Kelly Development Authority (GKDA) was created as a base development authority in accordance with Chapter 379B of the Texas Local Government Code.

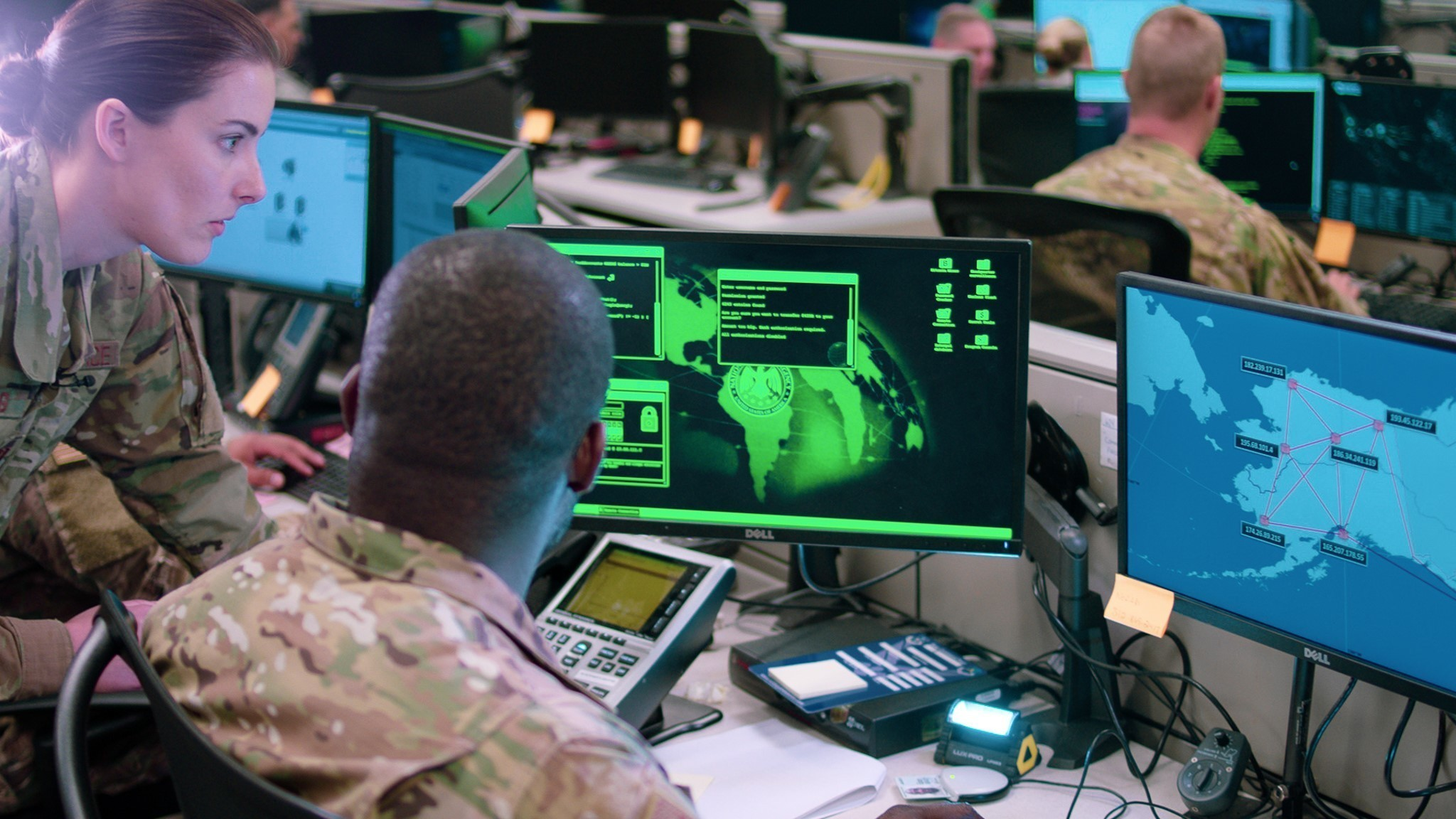
Cybersecurity operations at Port San Antonio

Rebranded as Port San Antonio in 2007, it is a political subdivision of the state of Texas. Its 11-member of board directors is appointed by each member of the San Antonio City Council. Jim Perschbach, Port San Antonio's President and CEO since 2018, oversees day-to-day activities. Margaret Wilson-Anaglia currently serves as the Board Chair and has been a member of the Board of Directors since 2018.

Although it is a public entity, the Port operates independently. It lacks taxing authority and does not receive operational funds from any governmental entity. Its annual income is derived from diverse real estate activities, such as leasing, property management, and construction management within its jurisdiction. The annual profits are reinvested to support additional redevelopment projects and associated economic development endeavors.

== Industries ==
=== Aerospace ===
Port San Antonio is home to large operations by The Boeing Company, StandardAero, Chromalloy and Knight Aerospace. These firms and others employ technicians who specialize in engine testing, aircraft maintenance, repair and overhaul (MRO), the development of air transport modules and high-tech aircraft painting and de-painting, among other services.

=== Cybersecurity ===
San Antonio's cybersecurity hub is largely concentrated on the Port campus, where private-sector firms Lockheed Martin, CACI, CNF Technologies, Northrop Grumman, IPSecure, Novetta Solutions and Technica Corporation support Department of Defense and private-sector clients.

=== Manufacturing, Robotics and Applied Technology ===
Port San Antonio's industrial platform features manufacturing operations for industries such as aerospace and automotive, among others. In recent years, a number of applied technology firms—such as India-based Indo-MIM, Plus One Robotics, Netherlands-based XYREC and space-based manufacturing venture Astroport Space Technologies—have established a presence at the Port.

In 2022, DeLorean Motor Company established its headquarters at the Port, where it will grow research and engineering operations.

=== Education ===
The campus is home to the San Antonio Museum of Science and Technology (SAMSAT), a non-profit organization that delivers educational programs, camps, demonstrations and other activities to area students.

Compass Rose Ingenuity, a K-12 STEM-based charter school that opened during the 2020-21 school year, is also based at the Port.

=== Defense ===
Over 6,000 workers on the Port campus consist of Department of Defense personnel in various capacities.

In addition to the 16th Air Force, the Port is also where national headquarters for other defense agencies are based, including the Air Force Installation Mission Support Center (AFIMSC) and the Air Force Civil Engineer Center (AFCEC).

=== Global Logistics ===
Port San Antonio's property is accessible by air at its industrial airport at Kelly Field (SKF). The campus includes a 350-acre railport (East Kelly Railport) and is within proximity of three interstate highways: IH-10, IH-35 and IH-37.

On-site tenants can also activate foreign-trade zone capabilities.

Logistics service providers at the Port include GXO Logistics, CIG Logistics, Forward Air Solutions, Fiesta Warehousing and Distribution and Watco Companies, who handles railcar switching.

== Key Facilities ==
=== Boeing Center at Tech Port ===
Boeing Center at Tech Port
- Interactive map of Boeing Center at Tech Port
- Former names: Tech Port Center + Arena (2022-2023)
- Address: 3331 General Hudnell Drive
- Location: San Antonio, Texas, U.S.
- Owner: Port San Antonio
- Operator: ASM Global
- Capacity: 3,100

Construction
- Opened: May 2, 2022
- Cost: $70 million

Website
- boeingcentertechport.com

Inaugurated in May 2022, the Tech Port Center + Arena is a 130,000-square-foot innovation center that hosts concerts, conventions, educational activities and esports competitions, among other events. The venue features of a state-of-the-art arena with a capacity to host 3,100 guests, an R&D tech collaboration space, a technology museum/showroom, LAN gaming center, meeting space and a full-scale food hall. It will also provide expansion space for SAMSAT beginning in the fall of 2022. In January 2023, the facility was renamed the Boeing Center at Tech Port following a $2.3 million investment and seven-year naming rights deal with Boeing.

=== Project Tech Buildings ===
Completed in 2018, Project Tech Building 1 is a 90,000-square-foot facility that provides secure facilities for cybersecurity CACI, CNF Technologies, Northrop Grumman, Novetta Solutions and Lockheed Martin.

Completed in 2020, Project Tech Building 2 provides office space for government operations.

=== Force-Protected Complex ===
Port San Antonio is home to a 70-acre site consisting of five buildings within a fenced perimeter. Informally known as Lackland Annex, the office facilities totaling 690,000 square feet serve as national headquarters for several Air Force and other Department of Defense operations.

=== Mixed-Use Properties ===
Approximately 400 acres at the Port are occupied by former Air Force office, residential and other mixed-use facilities. Among them are various historic buildings, including a bungalow colony that served as officer housing in the 1920s, several duplex residences that are significant examples of 1930-40’s art deco revival and the former base’s original headquarters building, which was originally erected during World War II.

The Port has repurposed former Air Force buildings and engaged in new construction to accommodate various office and residential functions.

In 1999 the Roberson Building—a three-story, 80,000-square foot facility—was constructed to serve as office space for incoming private-sector employers. Today, that facility accommodates several Department of Defense contractors who support clients at Lackland Annex and elsewhere in the region.

=== Gateway Residences ===
Port San Antonio's mixed-use properties also include the Gateway Residences at Port San Antonio (formerly Billy Mitchell Village Apartments)—374 townhome-style units that once served as military housing.

In 2010 the Port began redeveloping the property and upgrading units to serve as housing for the general public.

=== Upcoming Facilities ===
In June, 2022, the upcoming development of three new projects on the main campus was announced: a multi-story office tower to accommodate expansions by the DeLorean Company, a vertiport, and a research complex that will include a simulated lunar habitat facility. The new construction will break ground beginning in 2023.
