= 2016 Tejano Music Awards =

36th Tejano Music Awards
- Date: November 12, 2016
- Location: Tobin Center for the Performing Arts, San Antonio, Texas, U.S.

The 2016 Tejano Music Awards was held on November 12, 2016, at the Tobin Center for the Performing Arts in San Antonio, Texas. The deadline for nominations for the various Tejano Music Awards categories by the artists' representative are due by June 19, 2016. Nominations will then be announced at a later date for public voting. The annual 2016 Tejano Fan Fair (which precedes every Tejano Music Awards) was held at the Historic Market Square in San Antonio from March 17–20, 2016.

== Winners ==
- Song of Year/Artist/Group - "Adicta" – Elida Reyna y Avante
- Male Vocalist of the Year - Michael Salgado
- Female Vocalist of the Year - Elida Reyna
- Entertainer of the Year - Elida Reyna
- Album of the Year – Tejano - Adicta – Elida Reyna y Avante
- Album of the Year – Conjunto - Born to be Bad – Jaime y Los Chamacos
- Album of the Year – Norteño - Por Cielo Y Tierra – Michael Salgado
- Album of the Year – Gospel - Grand Symphony – Ricardo Sanchez
- Vocal Duo of the Year - Lucky Joe & Jose Zamora – "Sin Dolor No Hay Olvido"
- Best New Artist – Male - Rigo Navaira – Remedio
- Best New Artist – Female - Destiny Navaira – Remedio
- Best New Artist – Group - Remedio
- Lifetime Achievement Award - Bob Grever
