= Ram Herrera =

American tejano musician (born c. 1960)

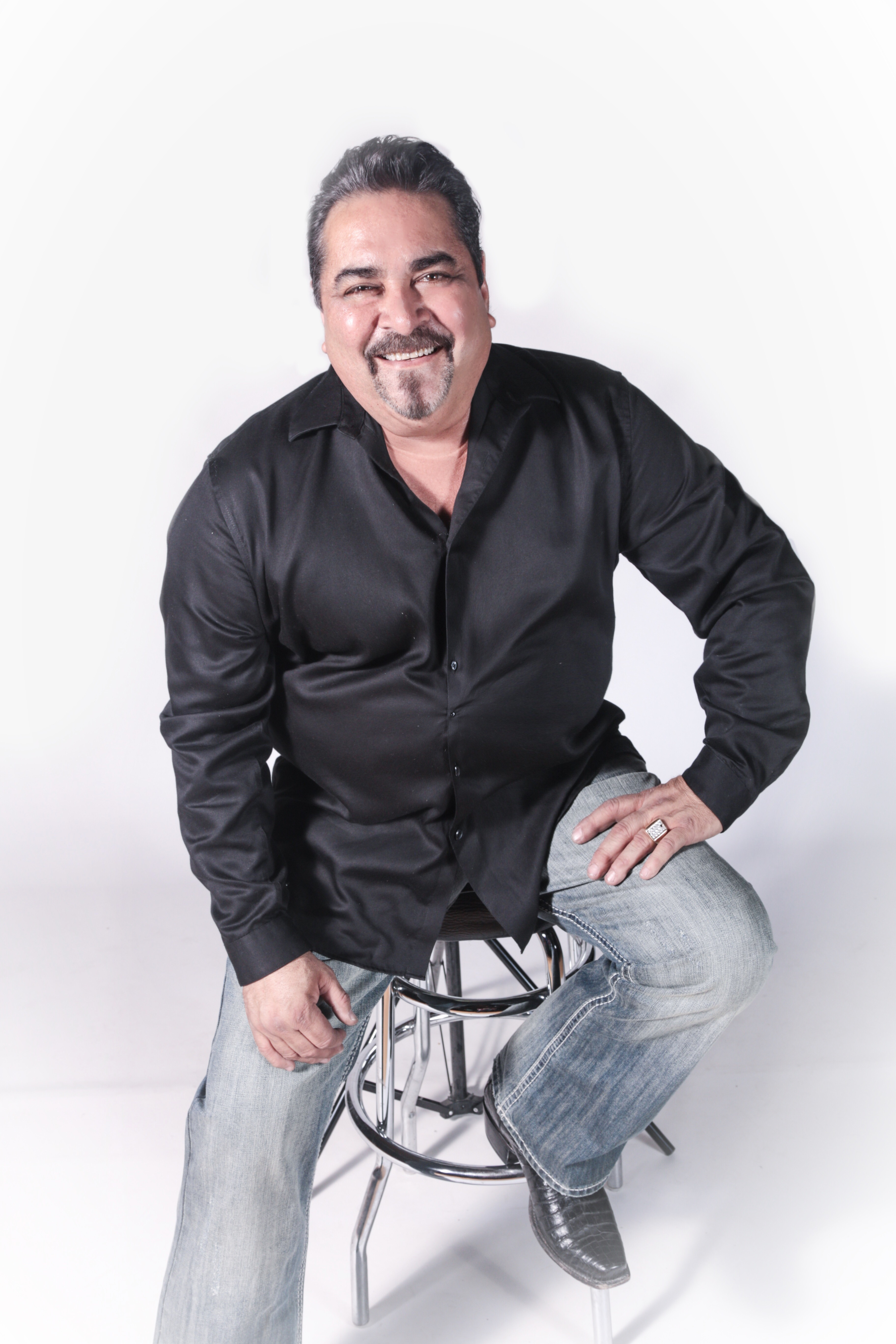
- Herrera in 2017

Background information
- Born: Ramiro Herrera; January 9, 1960 (age 66); San Antonio, Texas, US
- Genres: Tejano, regional Mexican, Latin pop
- Instrument: Vocals
- Years active: 1980s–present
- Formerly of: David Lee Garza y los Musicales
- Spouse: Liz Estrada (m. 2025)

Ramiro "Ram" Herrera (born in San Antonio, Texas. January 9, 1960) is an American Tejano musician.

== Career ==
Ram Herrera was raised in the Victoria Courts in San Antonio, Texas. Herrera gained popularity in the early 1980s for his role in the David Lee Garza y Los Musicales band, later starting his own band, Ramiro Herrera y Montana. Also in the early 1980s, he signed to Sony Music Entertainment and released Most Wanted Man in 1986. The album was his first to be recorded in English, as well as becoming certified gold.

At the 50th Annual Grammy Awards in 2007, Herrera was nominated for an award for his album Ram Herrera and the Outlaw Band. At the 3rd Annual Latin Grammy Awards, he was nominated for Best Tejano Album, for Ingrata, and was nominated for the same award at the 17th and 22nd Annual Latin Grammy Awards, for Mucho Mas Que Amor and Back On Track, respectively.

Herrera received a Lifetime Achievement Award at the 2025 Tejano Music Awards.

== Personal life ==
On July 7, 2017, Herrera was hospitalized for a collapsed lung.

On February 15, 2025, Herrera became engaged to Liz Estrada. They married on June 20.

In September 2025, Herrera announced that he had been diagnosed with Stage 4 prostate cancer, but expects to recover.

== Discography ==
- Most Wanted Man (1986)
- Pensamientos (1992)
- Insuperable (1993)
- Ven Mi Amor (1995)
- Cuenta Conmigo (1997)
- Con el Mismo Amor (1998)
- 30 Exitos Insuperables (2003)
- Soul Searching (2004)
- Ingrata (2005)
- Puro Tejano Gold (2008)
- Latin Classics (2009)
- En El Amor (2012)
- 12 Favoritas (2014)
- Mucho Mas Que Amor (2015)
- Back on Track (2021)
- Cariño Mío (2022)
