= Tobin Center for the Performing Arts =

Auditorium in San Antonio, Texas, U.S.

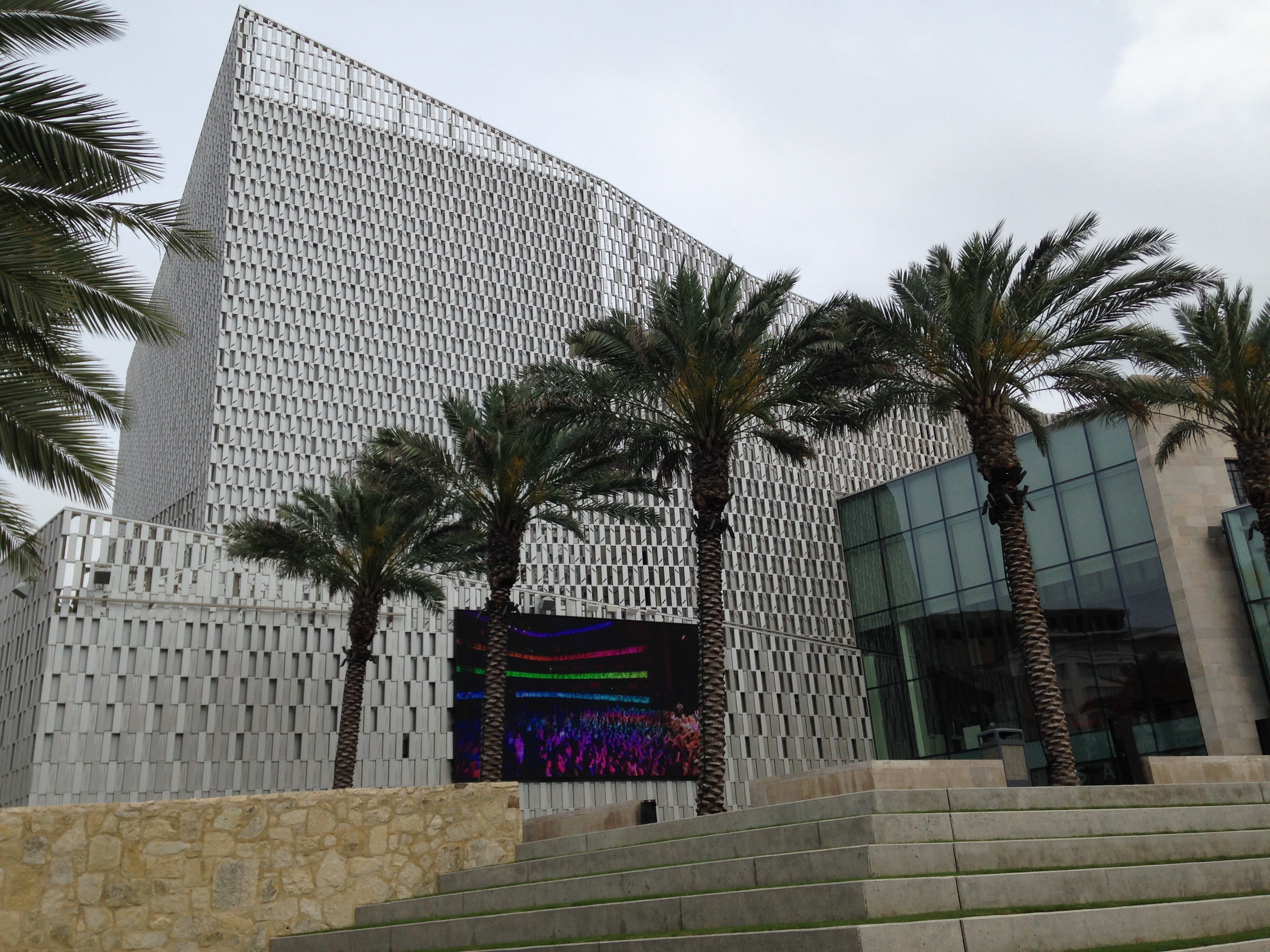
- Interactive map of Tobin Center for the Performing Arts
- Address: 115 Auditorium Circle; San Antonio, Texas 78205; United States
- Coordinates: 29.430698°N 98.488659°W
- Capacity: H-E-B Performance Hall: 1,760; Carlos Alvarez Studio Theater: 300; Riverwalk Plaza: 600

Construction
- Built: 1926 (opened as San Antonio Municipal Auditorium)
- Reopened: Sept 4, 2014

Website
- www.tobincenter.org

The Tobin Center for the Performing Arts is a performing arts center in San Antonio. Located next to the San Antonio Riverwalk, it is named for Robert L. B. Tobin, one of the city's most prominent residents.

== History ==
See also San Antonio Municipal Auditorium.

The Tobin Center was constructed on the site of the former San Antonio Municipal Auditorium, which had been built in 1926 and razed in 2009. Portions of the exterior of the Municipal Auditorium were preserved to be incorporated into the new facility. The renovation, by the Seattle-based LMN Architects and the local firm Marmon Mok Architecture, was completed, and the new facility opened, in 2014.

On October 2, 2014, Sir Paul McCartney performed a special benefit concert for the Tobin Center.

== Performance and other venues ==
=== H-E-B Performance Hall ===
This 1738-seat theater at the core of the center was designed to accommodate both acoustic and amplified performances with the specific intent of being the home to the (now-defunct) San Antonio Symphony, Opera San Antonio, and Ballet San Antonio. Seating is on four levels: orchestra, grand tier boxes, mezzanine, and balcony.

=== Carlos Alvarez Studio Theater ===
Built as a "black box theater," the 259-seat hexagon-shaped space is customizable for a variety of events.
