= Hometown Boys (Tejano band) =

The Hometown Boys are an American Tejano band based in Lubbock, Texas, formed in 1995.

The group recorded several albums for EMI Records from 1991 to 1995 before moving to Fonovisa.

The band won the 1997 Tejano Music Awards Best Instrumental Award for "Joe's Special 10", 2003 – 23rd Tejano Music Awards for Echame A Mi La Culpa which was Album of the Year, 2010 – 30th Anniversary Tejano Music Awards, 2011 – 31st Tejano Music Awards for Simplemente El Jefe, and 2012 – 32nd Tejano Music Awards, for Manteniendo La Promesa.

== Discography ==
- Tres Ramitas, 1994, with single "El Pintor" written by Johnny Degollado, album won Best Traditional Album at 1995 Tejano Music Awards and single "El Pintor" was reissued on EMI compilation 1995 Tejano Music Award Winners
