= Elida Reyna =

American singer (born 1972)

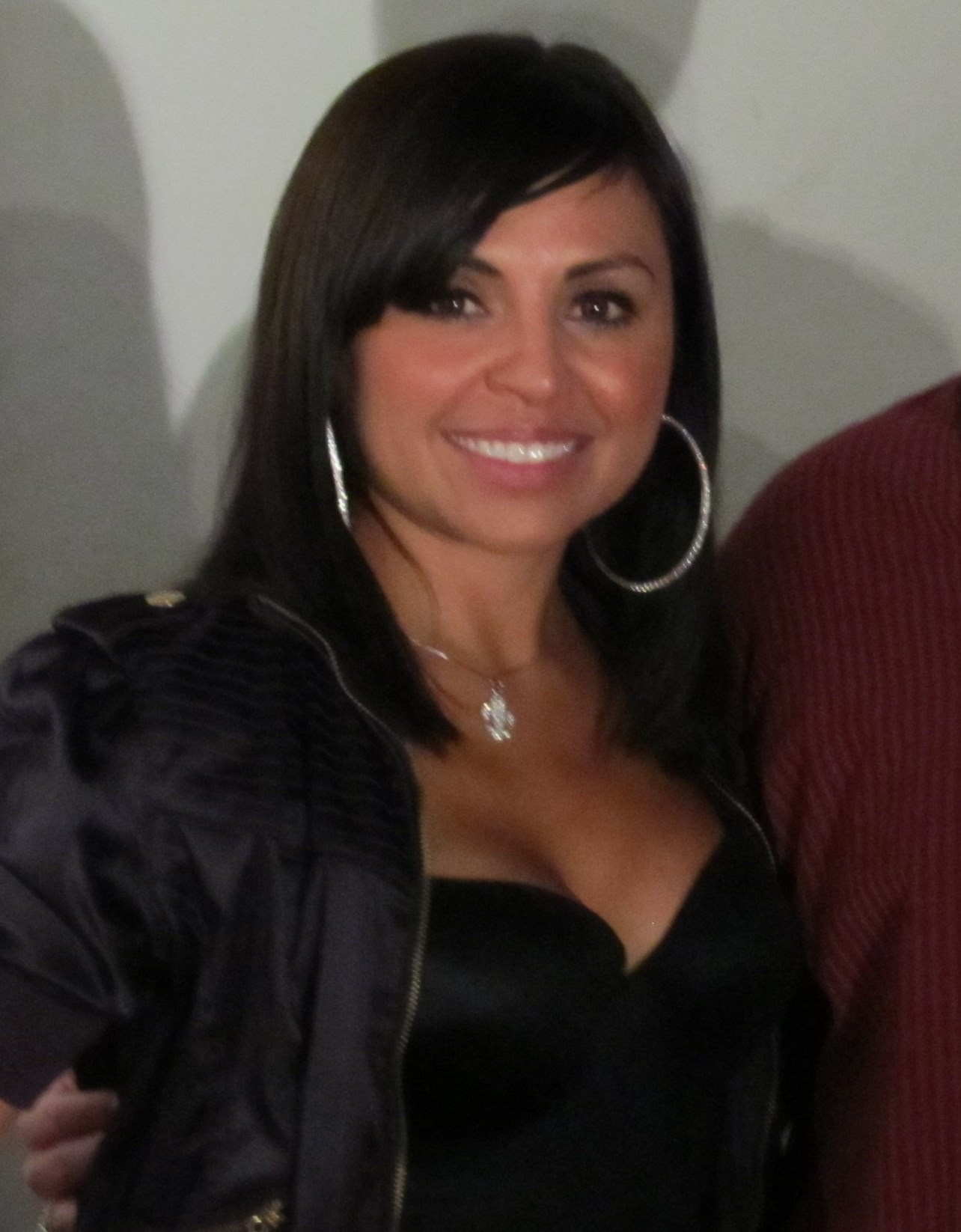
- November 11, 2010 – Elida Reyna won a LATIN Grammy Award.
- Born: Elida Reyna; August 17, 1972 (age 53); San Antonio, Texas, U.S.
- Other name: Elida La Reina De Mágico Valle
- Height: 5 ft 2 in (157 cm)
- Musical career
- Genres: Tejano; Ranchera
- Occupation: Singer-songwriter
- Instrument: Vocals
- Years active: 1992–2025
- Labels: Voltage Entertainment; Tejas Records; South Central Music; Freddie Records

Elida Reyna (born August 17, 1972), also known as Elida, is a Mexican American Tejano music singer.

Her band Elida Reyna Y Avante, also known as Elida Y Avante (EYA), is a Latin Grammy Award winning Tejano band formed in the Rio Grande Valley in 1992. Their first two albums "Atrevete" (1994) and "Algo Entero" (1996) were qualified for gold status and produced the popular singles "Luna Llena"and "Lagrimas De Amor". They were awarded "Billboard" Magazines "Revelacion Del Año" award, and were named "Rising Group of the Year" at the TTMA Industry Awards in 1995. Their 2010 album, "Fantasia", earned them a Latin Grammy Award. Lead singer Elida Reyna was given a place in the "Tejano Roots Hall of Fame".

== Biography ==
Elida Reyna was born in San Antonio, Texas. She first lived in Dallas, Texas, but she lived in a disinvested neighborhood, and her grandmother had been ill, so her family decided to move to Mercedes, Texas when she was 8 years old. She was then raised in Mercedes. Growing up she listened to Tejano Music legends like Roberto Pulido, La Mafia, Grupo Mazz and Laura Canales. Canales and her music had a big influence on Elida. Canales showed Elida that Tejano music wasn't just for guys. Reyna is known as "La Reina Del Valle Mágico" ("The Queen of Magic Valley") Reyna began singing at quinceañeras and weddings in 1988. In 1991, while studying at Pan American University in Edinburg, Texas, she met arranger Noel Hernandez. Hernandez later became the bass player for the band. In 1992, Reyna abandoned her studies to pursue music full-time.

=== Elida y Avante ===
Elida Reyna y Avante

Background information
- Also known as: Elida Y Avante, EYA
- Origin: Rio Grande Valley, Texas, U.S.
- Genres: Tejano; Ranchera
- Years active: 1992–2025
- Labels: Voltage Entertainment; Tejas Records; South Central Music; Freddie Records
- Members: Elida Reyna; Lalo Reyna, III; Victor Trevino; Lorenzo "Papo" Banda; Jacob DeLeon; Nicolas Rodriguez
- Past members: Roberto Longoria; Danny Bazan; Dusty Reyes; Cande Aguilar Jr.; Noel Hernandez; Larry Villanueva; Juan Martinez; Randy Villarreal; Epifanio Martinez; Casey Palma; Pete "Tiny" Gutiérrez; Robby Esparza; Leroy Esparza; Michael Molini; Crystal Martinez; Crissy Guerrero; Diane Herrera; Jose Macias

She formed Elida Y Avante in 1992 in the Rio Grande Valley of Texas. They released their first album Atrevete in 1994 under La Mafia's label at the time, Voltage Entertainment. This album spawned the hit "Luna Llena" They received TTMA Industry Awards for "Rising Group of the Year" and "Rising Female Vocalist of the Year" in 1995. It went gold (denoting sales of at least 50,000 units), propelled by the hit single "Luna Llena" and Hernandez's use of a stand-up bass to create a unique sound. Before they could enjoy their success, however, they were feuding with Voltage. Groups rarely leave a powerhouse like Voltage (with its major-label distribution) unless they've already lined up another company with comparable juice, so Elida y Avante shocked the industry by going out on its own. The group self-released one single and then did something nearly as shocking by signing in 1996 with unknown Tejas Records in San Antonio, which had released just one album—and a blues album at that. In 1996, Reyna won the TTMA Award for "Rising Female Star" and in 1997, she hosted the Pura Vida Awards. At the 1999 Tejano Music Awards, Elida Y Avante won "Most Promising Band of the Year". In 2000 Reyna scored big with a Ranchera song entitled, "Duele". At that years Tejano Music Awards, Reyna won "Female Vocalist of the Year", "Female Entertainer of the Year", & "Song of the Year", with "Duele". Reyna has since traveled the world, performing in Asia and Europe.

=== Las 3 Divas ===
In 2005, Reyna and fellow Tejano singers Shelly Lares, and Stefani Montiel, formed the girl group "Las 3 Divas". Their debut album Las 3 Divas earned rave reviews, plenty of radio airtime and critical acclaim even winning "Show Band of The Year". This album spawned the hits "La Cumbia Del Oeste" and "Hey Boy". Later that year, Las 3 Divas went on a 21-day tour overseas to entertain the troops. The "Armed Forces Entertainment Tour" began on September 27, 2005, and ended on October 17, 2005.

In 2007, Reyna signed with record label Freddie Records, and released her first album with them Domingo. Reyna has been featured in numerous magazines and other Latin publications. At the 2010 – 30th Anniversary Tejano Music Awards, Reyna won two Decade Ballots for "Female Vocalist of the 2000s" & "Best Song of the 2000s" with Duele. Reyna has also performed for President Barack Obama at the Latino Inaugural Ball, where she performed a duet "Quedemos Como Amigos" with fellow Tejano singer Michael Salgado. Reyna appeared in the Motion Picture "Harvest Of Redemption" directed by Javier Chapa. In the movie, she performed her hit "Duele". In 2010 Elida Reyna Y Avante released the album Fantasia. This album helped them win a Latin Grammy. Reyna and her band mostly performs at Tejano nightclubs, dances, and music festivals. Some of the bands popular songs include: "Luna Llena", "Te Sigo Amando", "Lagrimas De Amor", "Ya Basta", "Duele", "No Eres Para Mi", "Me Gustas", "Te Voy A Olvidar", "Muevete", "Tu Llegaste", "Cumbia Sabrosa", "Por Dios", "Por Ti", "El Tiki Tac", "Fantasia", "Prefiero Morir", and "Juntos Hasta Morir".

== Personal life ==
Elida is married to Lalo Reyna, III. She has three children: Natalia, Justin, and Leylah.

== Discography ==
=== Studio albums ===
Year	Discography	Album
1991	Mestizo Records	Sola
1994	Sony Records	Atrévete
1996	Tejas Records	Algo Entero
1998	Tejas Records	EYA 1998
1999	Tejas Records	Mágico
2001	Tejas Records	No Eres Para Mí
2003	Tejas Records	Muévete
2005	Tejas Records	Si Me Quieres
2006	Tejas Records	Mis Raíces
2008	Freddie Records	Domingo
2010	Freddie Records	Fantasía
2012	Freddie Records	Contigo Descubrí
2013	Freddie Records	EYA NATION
2014	Freddie Records	Al Fin Completa
2015	Freddie Records	Adicta
2017	Freddie Records	Mi Época
2018	Freddie Records	Colores

=== Compilations ===
Year	Discography	Album
2004	Tejas Records	Duele: Greatest Hits, Vol. 1
2004	Tejas Records	Luna Llena
2008	Tejas Records	Greatest Hits, Vol. 2
2012	Freddie Records	Lo Mejor
2014	Freddie Records	Club Mix
2017	Freddie Records	40 Éxitos

=== Live albums ===
Year	Discography	Album
2009	Freddie Records	Live
2011	Freddie Records	Simplemente Eya

== Awards ==
Tejano Music Awards

1999 – 19th Tejano Music Awards – Most Promising Band of the Year – Elida Y Avante

2000 – 20th Tejano Music Awards - Female Vocalist of the Year, Female Entertainer of the Year, Mexican Regional Song – Duele, Song of the Year – Duele.

2003 – 23rd Tejano Music Awards – Vocal Duo Shelly Lares & Elida Reyna – Amiga

2006 – 26th Tejano Music Awards - Crossover Song of the Year – Hey Boy – Las 3 Divas (Reyna, Montiel & Lares)

2007 – 27th Tejano Music Awards – Female Vocalist of the Year, Album of the Year – Conjunto – Mis Raizes, Crossover Song of the Year – Las 3 Divas – Slip ‘N’ Slide, Showband of the Year – Las 3 Divas

2008 – 28th Tejano Music Awards – Song of the Year (Elida's Medley), Female Vocalist of the Year.

2009 – 29th Tejano Music Awards - Female Vocalist of the Year.

2010 – 30th Anniversary Tejano Music Awards – Female Vocalist of the Year, DECADE BALLOT WINNERS – Female Vocalist 2000s, Best Song 2000s (Duele)

2011 – 31st Tejano Music Awards – Song of the Year (Prefiero Morir), Female Vocalist of the Year, Entertainer of the Year, Album of the Year – Tejano – Fantasia, Vocal Duo of the Year Elida Reyna & Michael Salgado – Amor O Costumbre

2012 – 32nd Tejano Music Awards – Song of the Year – Juntos Hasta Morir – Elida Reyna and Jesse Turner, Female Vocalist of the Year, Entertainer of the Year.

Latin Grammy Awards 2010

Best Tejano Album

Elida Reyna Y Avante – Fantasia

Latin Grammy Awards 2019

Best Tejano Album

Colores
