= Shelly Lares =

American singer-songwriter

- Born: Michelle Yvette Lares; November 13, 1971 (age 54); San Antonio, Texas, United States
- Origin: San Antonio, Texas, United States
- Genres: Tejano, Country
- Occupations: Guitarist, vocalist, songwriter
- Instruments: Guitar, percussion, vocals
- Years active: 1986–present
- Label: Shell Shock Records 3
- Website: http://www.shellylaresmusic.com/

Michelle Yvette Lares (born November 13, 1971), best known as Shelly Lares, is an American singer-songwriter, guitarist and percussionist. Starting in 1984, Lares was nominated for Female Vocalist of the Year for thirteen consecutive years and won several other awards at the Tejano Music Awards throughout her career. She signed a recording contract with Manny Records in 1986. She left the label in 1996, and signed with Sony Music Latin until the late 1990s. In 2006, she signed a recording contract with Tejas Records.

Lares is known for her "talent and charismatic stage presence and strong voice." according to AllMusic. Lares also writes all her songs that are featured on her albums. In 1988, Chris Perez joined her band and subsequently left the following year in favor of Selena y Los Dinos. Her 1994 album, Quiero Ser Tu Amante (1994), peaked at number 39 on the US Billboard Top Latin Albums chart. Her self-titled album, Shelly (1996), peaked at number 35 on the Top Latin Albums chart. The lead single from her album, "Siempre Lo Esperare", peaked at number 30 on the Hot Latin Tracks chart and number 18 on the Regional Mexican Songs chart. Her other single, "No Me Olvides", peaked at number 40 on the Hot Latin Tracks chart in 2000.

== Career ==
Shelly Lares was born on November 13, 1971, in San Antonio, Texas. Shelly and her cousin Tony Lares, formed the group "The New Generation Band" in 1985. The following year, Tony asked Chris Perez to join their group as their lead guitarist. Tony left in 1987, and Perez and Shelly renamed their band the "Shelly Lares Band". The following year, Perez left the band in favor of playing with Selena y Los Dinos. Lares was nominated for a Tejano Music Award for Best Female Vocalist of the Year. In 1996, Lares signed a recording contract with Sony Music Latin in hopes of a crossover into country music.

In 1996, Shelly released her self-titled album which included duets with country singer Vince Gill. By 2000, Shelly Lares became the most popular female Tejano singer. In 2005, Shelly Lares won Female Vocalist of the Year and Entertainer of the Year at the Tejano Music Awards.

Her single, "Siempre Lo Esperare", peaked at number 30 on the US Billboard Hot Latin Tracks chart. Her other single, "No Me Olvides", peaked at number 40 on the Regional Mexican Songs chart. Her album, Quiero Ser Tu Amante, peaked at number 39 on the Top Latin Albums chart.

In 2022, she provided vocals on the single "Break Through", along with rapper Squishy, Tejano pop singer Eric Lee, Anjelique, and ISXK. Lares began operating her own record label, Shellshock Records 3, and has signed TikToker El Gallo Dez, and 12-year-old Allie. Lares has produced recordings for Alicia C., and New Mexico singer Keana Huerta.

Lares' song with David Lee Rodriquez, "Como Vivir Sin Ti", was nominated for the Collaboration of the Year at the 2025 Tejano Music Awards.

== Personal life ==
In 2008, Lares came out as a member of the LGBT community. Lares moved to West Texas from San Antonio to be with a woman she was dating at that time. In 2018, Lares began dating Mia Gutierrez.

== Discography ==
- Tu Solo Tu (1989)
- Dynamite (1990)
- Sabes Que Si (1991)
- Tejano Star (1992)
- Apaga La Luz (1993)
- Quiero Ser Tu Amante (1994)
- Shelly (1996)
- Aqui Me Encuentro (1997)
- Donde Hay Fuego (1998)
- Mil Besos (2000)
- 3 Veces (2002)
- Encore (2003)
- Sigue Mi Camino (2004)
- Reflejo (2007)
- Mirando Adelante (2010)
- Renacer (2012)
- De Mi Corazon (2013)
- Obra De Amor (2019)
- LMD82 (2021)
