= Tejano Music Award for Song of the Year =

American music award

- Current: 2020 Tejano Music Awards
- Awarded for: Song of the Year
- Country: United States
- Presented by: Texas Talent Musicians Association
- First award: 1981
- Currently held by: Stevie D (2020)

Highlights
- Most awards: Mazz (9)
- Website: Tejano Music Awards

The Tejano Music Award for Song of the Year is an honor presented annually at the Tejano Music Awards, whose mission is to recognize the most talented performers of the genre. Songs nominated for the category are also eligible to be nominated for Single of the Year, and genre-specific categories Tejano Crossover, Mexican Regional Song, and Tejano Country Song of the Year. The only English-language recording to have won the award (and to be nominated) was "Oh Girl" by La Mafia in 1983, which was included on Honey, which also won Album of the Year.

Mazz is the most awarded group with nine wins, while Elida Reyna is the most awarded female singer with seven wins.

== Recipients ==
| Year | Songwriter(s) | Work | Performing artist(s) | Nominees | Ref. |
|---|---|---|---|---|---|
| 1981 | Luévano Marentes | "Senorita Cantinera" | Roberto Pulido | | |
| 1982 | Johnny Herrera | "Si Quieres Verme Llorar" | Lisa Lopez | | |
| 1983 | Eugene Booker | "Oh Girl" | La Mafia | | |
| 1984 | Joe Hernandez | "Ella" | Little Joe Y La Familia | "Tu, Tu Y Solo Tu" (Luis Silva); "Besos Y Copas" (Johnny Hernandez) | |
| 1985 | Benjamin Sánchez Mota | "Mi Loca Pasion" | La Mafia | | |
| 1986 | Joe Hernandez | "Las Isabeles" | Little Joe Y La Familia | | |
| 1987 | Cornelio Reyna | "Si Tu Supieras" | La Mafia | | |
| 1988 | Luis Silva | "Amor Querido" | Ramiro "Ram" Herrera | | |
| 1989 | Homero Aguilar | "Fijate" | David Marez | | |
| 1990 | Luis Silva | "Ahora Quiero Que Me Quieras" | Mazz | "Estando Yo Contigo" (Roberto Pulido); "El Aguacero" (Adalberto); "Contigo Quiero Estar" (Selena); "Como Tu Mujer" (New Variety Band); "Porque Tu Eres Mi Carino" (Shelly Lares); "Sensaciones" (Emilio Navaira); "Cuatro Caminos" (Laura Canales); "Querido Amigo" (Ruben Ramos and Little Joe Y La Familia); "Prieta Linda" (Grupo Presidente) | |
| 1991 | Joe Lopez | "No Te Olvidare" | Mazz | "Borracho de Besos" (La Fiebre); "El Sapo" (La Sombra) | |
| 1992 | Humberto Ramon | "Que Me Lleven Canciones" | Mazz | | |
| 1993 | Joe Lopez | "Lo Voy Hacer Por Ti" | Mazz | "Como la Hare" (Emilio Navaira); "Hasta Cuando" (David Lee Garza) | |
| 1994 | Calixto Ochoa | "La Charanga" | Fandango USA | "No Debes Jugar" (Selena); "Ya No Pones Atencion" (Emilio Navaira) | |
| 1995 | Selena / Pete Astudillo / A.B. Quintanilla | "Bidi Bidi Bom Bom" | Selena | | |
| 1996 | F. Valdes Leal | "Tu Solo Tu" | Selena | "Cómo Te Llamas" (Albert Lopez); "Estupido Romantico" (Mazz); "Me Esta Doliendo" (Inocencia); "Mire Amigo" (The Hometown Boys); "Para Que" (Joel Nava & The Border); "Por Favor Corazon" (Gary Hobbs); "Tonta" (David Lee Garza); "Ya No Voy a Detenerte" (Letty Guval) | |
| 1997 | Cuco Sánchez | "Siempre Hace Frio" | Selena | "Como Te Extrano" (Pete Astudillo); "El Coco Rayado" (Ruben Vela) | |
| 1998 | Humberto Ramon | "Mundo Sin Guitarras" | La Diferenzia | | |
| 1999 | A.B. Quintanilla | "Te Quiero Te Amo" | David Lee Garza | "Cowboy Cumbia" (Javier Molina); "Eres Mi Droga" (Intocable) | |
| 2000 | Elida Reyna / Marco Antonio Pérez | "Duele" | Elida Reyna | "El Amigo Que Se Fue" (Intocable); "Fuiste Mala" (Kumbia Kings) | |
| 2001 | Michael Salgado | "Ya No Voy Aguantar" | Michael Salgado | | |
| 2002 | Jimmy Gonzalez | "Ahora Que Hago Sin Ti" | Mazz | "Que Metida De Pata" (Jay Perez); "Shhh!" (Kumbia Kings) | |
| 2003 | Jimmy Gonzalez | "Yo Te Voy A Amar" | Mazz | "El Dolor de tu Presencia" (Jennifer Pena); "Quiero Ser Viejo" (Jay Perez); "Suena" (Intocable); "Vanidosa" (Bobby Pulido) | |
| 2004 | Jimmy Gonzalez | "Te Llevo En Mi Alma" | Mazz | | |
| 2005 | Pete Bustamante, Jr. / Mark Ledesma | "No Puedo Estar Sin Ti" | David Lee Garza | "Hello Baby Doll" (Carlos Maldonado and Grupo Fuerte); "Cómo Lo Voy Hacer" (Chente Barrera); "Admisión" (David Marez); "Si Me Dejas No Vale" (Felipe Muñoz); "Cuando El Destino" (Hometown Boys); "Corazon Dormido" (Jimmy González and Mazz); "Mi Ultimo Romance" (Jimmy Lee and Tentazion); "A Que Te Pongo" (K1); "Mi Cumbia, Mi Salsa" (Ram Herrera); "Contigo" (Solido); "Tomas Tomas" (Vida) | |
| 2006 | Joe Lopez | "Corazon De Fierro" | Mazz | "Brinca" (DJ Kane); "Sin Sangre en Mis Venas" (Sunny Sauceda); "Todo Una Mujer" (Adalberto); "Vida Mia" (La Fuerza) | |
| 2007 | Joe Lopez | "Paloma, Piquito De Oro" | Chente Barrera Y Taconazo | | |
| 2008 | Elida Reyna | "Elida's Medley" | Elida Reyna | | |
| 2009 | Humberto Ramon | "Retrato Quebrado" | Mazz | "La Llorona Loca" (Chente Barrera); "Domingo" (Elida Reyna); "Quiero Ese Amor" (Jay Perez); "Acariciame" (Ruben Ramos and The Mexican Revolution) | |
| 2010 | Raulito Navaira | "Bajo De Tu Sombra" | Raulito Navaira | "Playa del Sol" (Elida Reyna); "Estoy Convencido" (Jay Perez); "No Me Digas Que No" (Jimmy Gonzalez and Mazz); "Sigo Enamorada" (Stefani Montiel) | |
| 2011 | Elida Reyna / Eulalio Reyna | "Prefiero Morir" | Elida Reyna Y Avante | "Vuelve a Mi" (AJ Castillo); "Dias de Ayer" (Bobby Pulido); "Y Lo Nuestro Que" (Shelly Lares); La Botella" (Hometown Boys) | |
| 2012 | Bobby Garza | "Juntos Hasta Morir" | Elida Reyna and Jesse Turner | "Honky Tonks and Cantinas" (Michael Salgado); "Invencible" (Jay Perez); "Baila" (Shelly Lares) | |
| 2013 | Jesse Turner / Wences Romo | "Mi Mundo Se Acabo" | Siggno | "Bailamos y Platicamos" (Jimmy Gonzalez y Mazz); "Como Amar" (Ricky Valenz); "Dejate Amar" (Elida Reyna); "No Vale La Pena" (Ricardo Castillon y La Diferenzia) | |
| 2014 | Elida Reyna | "Muevelo Asi" | Elida Reyna Y Avante and Yeyo | "Acurrucate" (Johnny Hernandez); "Ella Sabe" (David Lee Garza); "Perdoname" (Mazz); "Que Te Vas de Mi" (Ricky Valenz) | |
| 2015 | Arturo Leyva / Wences Romo | "Te Llevare" | Siggno | "Atrévete Amarme" (Elida Reyna); "Cinco Tumbas" (Hometown Boys); "Ni El Tiempo Podrá" (La Fiebre); "Quisiera Ser Como Tu" (Mazz); "Toma Mi Corazoncito" (David Lee Garza and Juaquin Cura) | |
| 2016 | Lalo Reyna III | "Adicta" | Elida Reyna Y Avante | "Dime Si Estoy Loco" (Ram Herrera); "Mírala" (Ruben Ramos); "Todo Para Mí" (Jaime Y Los Chamacos); "Una Reflexión" (Michael Salgado) | |
| 2017 | Jay Perez / Juan Trevino | "Un Amigo Tendrás" | Jay Perez and the Band | "Agua De Papaya" (Jimmy Gonzalez Y Mazz); "Amor Eterno" (Gary Hobbs); "Mí Cumbia" (La Sombra); "Quien Quiere Shots" (Stefani Montiel) | |
| 2018 | Tirzah Joy Huerta Uecke / Jesse Eduardo Huerta Uecke / Tommy Torres | "¡Corre!" | Elida Reyna Y Avante | "Aguita De Melón" (Tejano Highway 281); "Basta De Tu Amor" (Jay Perez); "El Embrujo" (Jaime Y Los Chamacos); "Porque Tú No Estás" (Isabel Marie Sanchez) | |
| 2019 | Shelly Lares | "Devuélveme El Corazón" | Shelly Lares | "La Comadre" (Stefani Montiel); "Porque Todavía Te Quiero" (Jimmy Gonzalez Y Mazz); "Suavecito" (Elida Reyna Y Avante); "Tu Principe" (Lucky Joe) | |
| 2020 | Humberto Ramon | "Ahora Sigo Yo" | Stevie D and the All-Star Cast | "Ayer" (Shelly Lares with JR Gomez); "Basta De Tu Amor" (Jay Perez and the Band); "Echame La Culpa" (La Calma with Stefani Montiel); "Inquebrantable" (Elida Reyna Y Avante) | |

== See also ==
- Music of Texas
