= Tejano Music Award for Single of the Year =

Former American music award

- Awarded for: Single of the Year
- Country: United States
- Presented by: Local television and radio stations
- First award: 1981
- Currently held by: Selena (1995)

Highlights
- Most awards: Mazz (4)
- Website: Tejano Music Awards

The Tejano Music Award for Single of the Year was an honor presented annually at the Tejano Music Awards from 1981 to 1995. The category was retired, while eligible entries were nominated for the Tejano Music Award for Song of the Year and the genre-specific categories Tejano Crossover, Mexican Regional Song, and Tejano Country Song of the Year. The only English-language recording to have won the award (and to be nominated) was "Oh Girl" by La Mafia in 1983, which was included on Honey, which also won Album of the Year. The most awarded artist is Mazz, who holds four wins, while Luis Silva remains the most awarded songwriter.

== Recipients ==
Year	Songwriter(s)	Work	Performing artist(s)	Nominees	Ref.
1981	Luévano Marentes	"Senorita Cantinera"	Roberto Pulido		
1982	Johnny Herrera	"Si Querida Verme Llorar"	Lisa Lopez		
1983	Bobby Russell	"Honey"	La Mafia		
1984	Luis Silva	"Tu, Tu y Solo Tu"	La Mafia	"Ella" (Joe Hernandez); "Mentiras, Mentiras" (David Lee Garza)	
1985	Benjamin Sánchez Mota	"Mi Loca Pasion"	La Mafia		
1986	Carlos Cárdenas	"Un Rinconcito En El Cielo"	Ramón Ayala		
1987	Luis Silva	"Entre Mas Lejos Me Vaya"	David Marez		
1988	Luis Silva	"Amor Querido"	Ramiro "Ram" Herrera		
1989	Juan Solis	"Ay Mujer"	Latin Breed		
1990	Juan Manuel Barco	"Ahora Quiero Que Me Quieras"	Mazz	"Borracho de Besos" (La Fiebre); "Amor Con Amor" (Mazz); "Sensaciones" (Emilio Navaira); "El Sapo" (La Sombra); "La Mancha" (Ram Herrera); "El Ojo de Vidrio" (David Lee Garza)	
1991	Unknown	"Amor Con Amor"	Mazz	"A Donde Vas" (La Sombra); "El Sapo" (La Sombra)	
1992	Lalo Rodríguez	"Ven Devorame Otra Vez"	Mazz		
1993	Joe Lopez	"Lo Voy Hacer Por Ti"	Mazz	"Como la Hare" (Emilio Navaira); "Hasta Cuando" (David Lee Garza)	
1994	Calixto Ochoa	"La Charanga"	Fandango USA	"No Debes Jugar" (Selena); "Ya No Pones Atencion" (Emilio Navaira)	
1995	A.B. Quintanilla	"Amor Prohibido"	Selena	"Si Lo Quieres" (La Diferencia); "Entre Verde Y Azul" (Gary Hobbs)	

== See also ==
- Music of Texas
