= Gary Hobbs =

- Born: January 5, 1960 (age 66); Amarillo, Texas
- Occupations: Singer-songwriter, record producer, actor
- Years active: 1976–present
- Spouse: Diana (m. 1980)
- Children: Gary Lee Hobbs III; Kimberlee Diane
- Parents: Gary Lee Hobbs; Anita Hobbs
- Musical career
- Genres: Tejano, Tejano cumbia, ranchera
- Labels: Hacienda; RCA; CBS Discos; EMI Latin; Sony Discos; AMMX; Freddie Records
- Website: www.garyhobbs.com

Gary Lee Hobbs (born January 5, 1960) is an American singer-songwriter, record producer, and actor. Called "Tejano music's Vince Gill", he has been widely recognized for his resonant baritone vocals, characterized by their emotive quality, and is considered a pioneer within the genre. Hobbs played a significant role in the expansion of Tejano music during the 1990s and became one of the most popular Tejano singers of the 1980s and 1990s.

Hobbs started playing piano and guitar at seven or eight and played the trumpet in high school. He played with local groups before forming the Hot Sauce band with Brando Mireles, recording songs for Hacienda Records, and taking the role of lead vocalist in 1983. At the 1984 Mike Chavez Music Awards, Hobbs received the award for Most Promising Vocalist. His songs, "Mentiras" and "Las Miradas", achieved commercial success and critical acclaim. By the late 1980s, Hobbs became one of the most popular Tejano singers following "La Miradas" ascending to number one on the Tejano Singles chart in 1991 and signed with EMI Latin. Ta Vas a Acordar (1993), was certified gold for reaching sales of 50,000 units, and its titular track peaked at number one on Radio y Musica's Tejano Singles chart for nine weeks, the second-most weeks a song spent atop the chart in 1995. In a strategic endeavor to promote Hobbs in Mexico, EMI Latin rebranded his band from Hot Sauce to Grupo Mezquite in August 1994. Te Vas a Acordar ended 1994 as the 13th best-selling Regional Mexican Album in the United States.

Hobbs released Soy el Mismo in 1995, while it received a mixed response from music critics, it peaked at number seven on the US Billboard Top Latin Albums chart and number three on the US Billboard Regional Mexican Albums chart. "Por Favor Corazon" peaked at number 18 on the Hot Latin Songs chart and number 15 on the Regional Mexican Songs chart, and ended 1995 as the second-best Tejano single on Radio y Musica, while "Tu Me Haces Sentir" ended the year as the 13th-best Tejano single of 1995. Following the release of Corazon Ardiente (1996), Hobbs became a spokesperson for Coca-Cola. During a period of decline in the popularity of Tejano music and decreasing sales within the genre, Hobbs created his own record label and studio, Faith Digital Recording Studio and AMMX. After his contract expired with EMI Latin in 1998, Hobbs signed with Sony Discos. The singer received the BMI Songwriters Award in 1998 for "Buscando Un Amor" and "Corazon Ardiente" and in 1999 for "Comprendeme".

By 2001, Hobbs became independent and released subsequent albums through his AMMX label. At the 2020 Tejano Music Awards, Hobbs won Male Entertainer of the Year, after years of being nominated. On August 31, 2021, Hobbs launched his podcast Hanging With Gary, with co-host Johnny Davila. On April 20, 2022, Hobbs signed with Freddie Records, citing the label's ability to secure radio airplay for their artists as his reason, and released Sin Fin that December. In 2019, Hobbs received recognition from the Texas State Legislature, represented by Poncho Nevarez, for his contributions to Tejano music. In recognition of his humanitarian contributions, Hobbs was awarded the Humanitarian Award by the Tejano Entertainers and Musicians Association Awards (TEMA) in 1999.

== Career ==
=== 1960–1982: Early life and career beginnings ===
Gary Lee Hobbs, Jr. was born two months prematurely on January 5, 1960, at the Amarillo Air Force Base in Amarillo, Texas. He grew up in Eagle Pass, Texas, the son of Gary Lee Hobbs, who served in the Air Force, and his mother, Anita Hobbs (née McLemore Sanchez), who was a música trío and mariachi singer of Mexican Scottish and Irish descent. Hobbs' maternal grandmother, Lucia, lived on a ranch in Monclova, Coahuila, while his maternal grandfather played the trumpet. During his youth, Hobbs often watched his mother perform as a singer, and was exposed to classical music.

At the age of seven or eight, (Note: Age seven, age eight.) Hobbs started playing the piano and later learned to play the guitar. He also played the trumpet in his high school choir and was a soloist for his church's choir in 1971. Before performing with Brando Mireles, a former keyboardist from Mazz, between 1977 and 1980, (Note: 1977, 1980.) Hobbs played with local groups such as Chicano Breed and Starlight. Together, they formed the Hot Sauce Band and began recording songs for Hacienda Records in May 1983. Hobbs took on the role of lead singer and later learned to play the keyboards. The name "Hot Sauce" came about when Mireless suggested it while adding hot sauce to his food, realizing that the group did not have a name for an upcoming show. Initially, Hobbs didn't like the name and considered it "the stupidest name I ever heard in my life".

=== 1983–1990: Early success with Hacienda Records ===
Promoters referred to Hobbs as "the lady killer" of Tejano music. At the 1983 Tejano Music Awards, Hobbs won Most Promising Vocalist, and was nominated for Male Vocalist of the Year, and Male Entertainer of the Year. At the 10th Mike Chavez Music Awards in 1984, Hobbs was awarded the Most Promising Male Vocalist, while his Hot Sauce group was nominated for Most Promising Band, and his single "Se Acabo" received a nomination for Best New Song by A New Group. At the 1984 Tejano Music Awards, Hobbs received a nomination for Male Vocalist of the Year, while his song, "Confidencias de Amor", was nominated for Song of the Year. In 1985, Hobbs released Mentiras, with its eponymous track initially overlooked, it gradually amassed recognition over the course of two years. Eventually, the titular song gained substantial commercial and critical acclaim. Corpus Christi Caller-Times's Rene Cabrera, hailed "Mentiras" as an "expertly crafted" sentimental ballad, showcasing Hobb's adeptness. The song was recorded under a licensing agreement with RCA Records and subsequently featured on EMI Latin's compilation, Five Branding Irons (1992). The track was intended for inclusion on Hobbs' Solo Estas Noche (1992), though was omitted from the final tracklist, a lucrative misstep according to Cabrera. Hobbs recorded the song after listening to Lupita D'Alessio's rendition.

Hobbs was nominated for Best Male Vocalist at the 1988 Mike Chavez Music Awards. At the 1989 Tejano Music Awards, Hobbs amassed nominations for Single of the Year with "Quiero Ser Tu Amor", Song of the Year for "Ensenar a Querer", Male Entertainer of the Year, and Un Momento was nominated for Album of the Year – Orchestra. By 1988, Hobbs became one of the most popular Tejano singers.

At the 1990 Tejano Music Awards, Hobbs was nominated for Male Entertainer of the Year and Male Vocalist of the Year. By 1990, promoters dubbed him "the blue-eyed sensation". On the week ending December 13, 1990, "Vas a Pagar" made its entry into the Tejano Singles chart at number ten, as did "Las Miradas" the following week. "Las Miradas" reached number two for seven nonconsecutive weeks beginning in the week of January 24, 1991, (Note: Week of January 24, January 31, February 7, March 14, March 21, May 16, and June 13, 1991.) before peaking at number one on the week ending June 20.

=== 1991–1998: Commercial success with EMI Latin ===
In 1991, Hobbs signed a six-figure contract with EMI Latin. At the 1992 Tejano Music Awards, "Las Miradas" was nominated for both Song of the Year and Single of the Year. The singer's eponymous album received a nomination for Album of the Year, while Hobbs was a contender for Male Entertainer of the Year. In May 1992, Hobbs released Solo Esta Noche, which featured "Amame y Besame", which peaked at number one on the Tejano Singles chart on the week ending August 20, 1992. It garnered the nomination for Song of the Year, while Hobbs received the nomination for Male Entertainer of the Year, and Solo Esta Noche received the nomination for Album of the Year. Hobbs recorded "Recordemos" and "Paz Esta Navidad" for the Christmas compilation, Christmas in Texas (1992). Suzy Banks of Texas Monthly, noted that comprehending the emotional pleas conveyed in "Paz Esta Navidad" does not necessitate an understanding of the Spanish language, as listeners can apprehend Hobbs sentiments through his vocal delivery. In April 1993, Gary Hobbs Live was released.

In March 1994, Hobbs recorded a pilot episode of Camino de Lagrimas, a Tejano telenovela that producers aspired to pitch to Spanish networks. Ta Vas a Acordar (1993) reached sales of 50,000 units and receive a gold certification in June 1994. Its singles, "Voy a Amarte" reached the third position, while "Te Vas a Acordar" peaked at number one on the Tejano Singles chart. In an effort to promote Hobbs in Mexico, EMI Latin endeavored to alter the singer's band name from Hot Sauce to Grupo Mezquite in August 1994, believing that Hot Sauce would not resonate with Mexican audiences. Hobbs perceived the name change as the second "dumbest thing I ever heard in my life", second only to Hot Sauce. According to Hobbs, Mezquite, the Spanish term for the mesquite tree, flourishes in his hometown and symbolizes his heritage. The singer commenced negotiations with Apodcada Promotions to secure management and booking arrangements in Mexico. As a jest, Hobbs would refer to his band as "the usual suspects", a phrase from the film Casablanca (1942), which reminded him of the constant turnover of its members.

"Te Vas a Acordar" (1993)
"Te Vas a Acordar" garnered the nominations for the Tejano Music Award for Song of the Year and Single of the Year at the 1995 Tejano Music Awards, and spent nine weeks at number one on Radio y Musica's Tejano Singles chart.

At the 1995 Tejano Music Awards, "Te Vas a Acordar" garnered nominations for Song of the Year and Single of the Year, while Hobbs received a nomination for Male Entertainer of the Year, and Te Vas a Acordar was nominated for Album of the Year. By May 1995, Te Vas a Acordar had sold 90,000 units, and its titular track spent nine weeks at number one on Radio y Musica's Tejano Singles chart, securing the second-longest song that year, behind Selena's "Bidi Bidi Bom Bom" (1994), which spent 13 weeks at the top spot. Within the album, "La Miradas", features a lyrical narrative that depicts the captivating gaze a woman employs to ensnare a man's affection, while the title track delves into the intricacies of lost love. Te Vas a Acordar ended 1994 as the 13th best-selling regional Mexican album and the 34th best-selling Latin album in the United States. "Tu Me Haces Sentir" made its debut at number 49 on the US Billboard Hot Latin Songs chart, the week ending September 16, 1995, and became known as one of the most popular Tejano singers.

Hobbs released Sol el Mismo on March 7, 1995, and by May 1995 it sold 35,000 units. At the 1996 Tejano Music Awards, Soy el Mismo was nominated for Album of the Year. Hobbs, along with composer Carmen Ravenna, received the BMI Latin Songwriter award for their work on "Chiquitita, Chiquitita". In the music video for "Por Favor Corazon", Hobbs portrayed an outlaw from the 19th century, captured at the 64,000-acre Tinkler Ranch located in Fort Stockton. Hobbs revealed that the horseback riding scene proved physically challenging, resulting in some bruises, as it had been some time since he last mounted a horse when he was in high school. "Por Favor Corazon" debuted and peaked at number 18 on the US Billboard Hot Latin Songs chart and number 15 on the US Billboard Regional Mexican Songs chart, on the week ending May 20, 1995. "Chiquitita" peaked at number 34 on the Hot Latin Songs chart, on the week ending February 11, 1995. "Por Favor Corazon" ended 1995 as the second-best Tejano single on Radio y Musica, while "Tu Me Haces Sentir" was the 13th-best Tejano single of 1995. "Por Favor Corazon" was nominated for Song of the Year while Hobbs was nominated for Male Entertainer of the Year at the 1996 Tejano Music Awards.

Writing for Fort Worth Star-Telegram, Ramiro Burr expressed his disappointment with Soy el Mismo, labeling it as a disheartening letdown due to its tedious nature, largely attributed to the monotonous keyboard-synthesizer melodies. In contrast, Cabrera acknowledges Hobbs as an artist who crafts songs that leave a lasting impression on Soy el Mismo. Tracks such as the cumbias "Por Favor Corazon" and "Tu Me Haces Sentir" and the rancheras "Quiero Que Vuelvas" and "Esperando Tu Amor", showcase Hobbs' ability to deliver captivating melodies infused with heartfelt emotions, as noted by Cabrera. Paul Verna of Billboard, recognizing the comparatively lesser media coverage received by Hobbs in comparison to his contemporaries, noted that Soy el Mismo made "a strong debut" at number 20 on the US Billboard Top Latin Albums chart. Soy el Mismo rose to number seven and debuted at number three on the US Billboard Regional Mexican Albums chart, taking the greatest gain in sales for the week ending April 1, 1995. Chito de la Torre of La Prensa, found the album's title ironic, considering the singer's transformation in image and the renaming of his band as part of his pursuit to establish a presence in Mexico. According to de la Torre, this transition became apparent when the singer donned Western attire at the 1995 Tejano Music Awards.

Following the release of Hobbs' album, Corazon Ardiente (1996), Cabrera perceived a departure from the customary style that Hobbs typically imbues into his musical offerings, finding Corazon Ardiente to surpass Soy el Mismo in terms of its impact. The lead single, "Buscando Un Amor", was released on June 27, 1996. Cabrera characterizes Hobbs' signature style throughout the album as melodic, polished, and engaging, exemplifying his artistry. At the 1997 Tejano Music Awards, Hobbs was nominated for Song of the Year for "Buscando Un Amor", while its album received the nomination for Album of the Year, and Hobbs was nominated for Male Vocalist and Male Entertainer of the Year. In 1996, Hobbs signed a contract with Coca-Cola, who subsequently became sponsors for his tours. "Buscando Un Amor" peaked at number 24 on the Hot Latin Songs chart and number 11 on the Regional Mexican Songs chart, in the week ending September 7, 1996. "Corazon Ardiente" peaked at number 41 on the Hot Latin Songs chart, in the week ending August 3, 1996. In 1997, Hobbs secured a role in the film Lost Cowboy, and in April 1998, he released Solo Es Un Sueno.

=== 1998–2000: Label change to Sony Discos ===
The popularity of Tejano music witnessed a decline in the aftermath of Selena's shooting death in March 1995, prompting major record labels to adopt a cautious approach in their dealings with Tejano singers, given the declining sales within the genre. In response, Hobbs established his own record label and studio, Faith Digital Recording Studio, circumventing the conservative strategies employed by major labels in response to the diminishing sales of Tejano music.

In September 1998, Hobbs's contract with EMI Latin expired, leading him to sign with Sony Discos. Hobbs expressed his belief that Sony would offer him the professional support he needed as an artist, facilitating the realization of his personal aspirations. Hobbs received the BMI Songwriters Award in 1998 for "Buscando Un Amor" and "Corazon Ardiente", while he and Carlos Javier Castillon were awarded the 1999 BMI Songwriters award for "Comprendeme". Hobbs released Mirame a Mi, his debut with Sony, featuring songs penned by Humberto Ramon with arrangement handled by Mireles. The singer was garnered sponsorship from Churches Fried Chicken and Sears.

At the 2000 Tejano Music Awards, Hobbs was nominated for Male Entertainer of the Year and Male Vocalist of the Year. Tejano music continued to experience a decline in popularity, Hobbs, along with other Tejano singers, encountered reduced airplay opportunities by 2000. "Mirame a Mi" reached number ten on the Radio y Musica Tejano chart. In 2000, the singer secured a role in Paul Mitchell's hair product ads. Hobbs released Sueno de Mi Corazon, in September 2000. Hobbs expressed in the Abilene Reporter-News that he anxiously monitored its chart progression on Radio y Musica's Tejano music chart as closely as the 2000 United States Presidential Election. The album's commercial impact instilled a sense of restlessness and was the first album to elicit concern from him. Sueno de Mi Corazon featured additions of the saxophone, accordion, and digitally altered vocals. While expressing a desire to explore Latin Christian music, Hobbs lamented Sony's reluctance to allow the release of both a Tejano and Christian album simultaneously, citing the need to avoid overlapping ventures.

"Sueno De Mi Corazon" garnered a nomination for Song of the Year at the 2001 Tejano Music Awards. "Simplemente Amigos" entered the top 20 on the Tejano Singles chart, while "Sueno de Mi Corazon" reached the top ten. "Dime Que Soy Tuyo" reached number four on the Tejano Singles chart, before peaking at number two in the week ending September 7, 2001.

=== 2001–2022: Independent with AMMX ===
By 2001, Hobbs became independent and released subsequent albums through his AMMX label (abbreviated for Americano Mexicano). Hobbs signed Laura Aguiree to his label, where he produced her debut album, Mi Corazon (2002), which was released through Wal-Mart and other department stores. Aguiree remained under Hobbs's management for two to three years. Recognizing Hobbs' 19-year tenure as a Tejano Music Award nominee without a win, Nicole Brambila of San Angelo Standard-Times, hailed him as "one of the most versatile singers" in the Tejano market. Hobbs expressed to Brambila that the absence of a Tejano Music Award was "one thing that eluded me". Seeking to break new ground, the singer released Cosas del Destino on October 8, 2002, showcasing a fusion of norteño, grupo, and Tejano styles. This approach was inspired by Hobbs's admiration of these fusions he witnessed during performances on Univision and Telemundo.

By October 2003, Hobbs expanded his business by taking on managerial roles for Tokante, a norteño and Tejano group. Amidst the production of Ayer y Hoy, Hobbs shared with Rose Ybarra of The Monitor, his sense of optimism and excitement, asserting that he felt "really good about it" and eagerly anticipated its completion. The album was released in February 2004, and was nominated for Album of the Year at the 2005 Tejano Music Awards. Hobbs's subsequent release, Esperando Tu Llamada (2005), presented a collection of ballad-infused tracks, while Por Ti released in August 2006, showcased a return to a more traditional Tejano sound infused with "old-school influence". In 2007, Hobbs extended his label's roster by signing Da Krazy Pimps, solidifying a four-year contract.

Hobbs garnered recognition in September 2011 at the Mike Chavez Music Awards, which returned after a 14-year hiatus, for his contributions to Tejano music. Hobbs released A Very Gary Christmas in December 2015. He recorded Christmas music standards "Frosty the Snowman", "Rudolph the Red-Nosed Reindeer", "I'll Be Home for Christmas", "Jingle Bells", and "Here Comes Santa Claus". While Eduardo Martinez of The Monitor regarded the album as somewhat ordinary, he praised Hobbs' exceptional vocal abilities on the album. In 2013, Hobbs lent his voice to "La Barca" as part of David Lee Garza's Just Friends album, which won a Grammy Award for Best Tejano Album. The singer released Recuerdo...De Mi Madre in 2016, featuring recordings that his mother would often perform, dedicating the album to her. At the 2017 Tejano Music Awards, Hobbs was nominated for Song of the Year for "Amor Enterno" while he received a nomination for Male Vocalist of the Year. On September 23, 2019, Hobbs released "Lo Que Amo", the lead single from the album of the same name. In 2019, he collaborated with Rick Fuentes on "Toda Una Vida" for Fuentes' Tribute (2019) album.

On April 17, 2020, Hobbs released "Tu Eres Mi Reina", John Henry Medina of Tejano Nation, praised it as an "upbeat [and] uplifting ranchera". Hobbs won Male Entertainer of the Year at the 2020 Tejano Music Awards, calling it a remarkable milestone that he checked off his bucket list. On August 31, 2021, Hobbs launched his podcast Hanging With Gary, with co-host Johnny Davila, through his website.

=== 2022–present: Tenure under Freddie Records ===
On April 20, 2022, Hobbs signed with Freddie Records, despite having his own label, he recognized the track record of Freddie Records in securing radio airplay for their artists. In September 2022, Hobbs collaborated with Kary Karina on the recording "Que Lastima". Hobbs released Sin Fin on December 30, 2022, his first album with Freddie Records and his first recording in three years. The lead single, "Que Daria", a mid-tempo Tejano cumbia track, was released in December 2022. "Que Daria" garnered acclaim for its catchy sing-along chorus, Hobbs' vocal performance, and the production value that featured layered brass, keyboards, and accordion fills. The music video was released on April 20, 2023. Hobbs and Kary Karina received a Collaboration of the Year nomination for "Que Lastima" at the third Premios Tejano Mundial in 2023.

At the 2023 Tejano Music Awards, Sin Fin was nominated for Album of the Year.

== Personal life ==
In 1980, Hobbs married Diana, and together they had a son named Gary Lee Hobbs III, born in October 1983, as well as a daughter Kimberlee Diane, born in October 1985. Hobb's son started playing the congas and other percussions for him in 2003. The singer was often sporting cowboy boots and blue jeans, but when his son gifted him a black western hat in 1995, he received negative reactions from fans who assumed he was emulating Emilio Navaira for amusement. Hobbs runs a ranch in his hometown where he enjoys raising horses and beefmaster cattle.

Hobbs drew inspiration from Latin Breed, the Royal Jesters, Jimmy Edward, Adalberto Gallegos, and David Marez. Apart from music, he also has a passion for playing baseball. Called "Tejano's Vince Gill", Hobbs is recognized for his baritone vocal range, expressive, and resonant vocals, and is considered to possess the "smoothest voice" in the genre. He is regarded as a pioneer in Tejano music, contributing to the genre's growth throughout the 1990s, and one of the most popular Tejano singers of the 1980s and 1990s. His songs often feature compelling romantic narratives, characterized by a smooth, nightclub ambiance featuring relaxed yet rhythmic and enticing melodies. Hobbs frequently performs cumbia, ranchera, and old rock songs transitioning between swooning love songs and lively cumbias. Known for his versatile role as a producer, composer, musician, and vocalist, he is known for enticing fans with his Tex-Mex rhythms and pop arrangements. His band is known for delivering captivating performances on stage.

== Philanthropy ==
Hobbs participated in the charitable event held at the Red Bluff Studios in September 1989, contributing to the fundraising efforts dedicated to supporting youth programs and scholarships for Mexican Americans. Hobbs and Elsa García, performed at the 1989 Houston Gay Pride Parade, aiming to generate funds for organizations fighting AIDS and scholarships benefiting LGBT Hispanics. In July 1991, Hobbs performed for the Southwest Voter Registration Education Project (SVREP), engaging in a statewide campaign to promote citizen registration and encourage voting. In April 1994, Hobbs took part in a benefit dance organized for The Head Start P.T.O. In October 1995, Hobbs performed for The United Students Club fundraiser at Austin Junior High and advocated for a drug-free lifestyle. In recognition of his humanitarian endeavors, Hobbs was awarded the Humanitarian Award by the Tejano Entertainers and Musicians Association Awards (TEMA) in 1999. Since 1999, Hobbs has consistently performed at H-E-B's annual Feast of Sharing on Christmas Eve, an event based in Corpus Christi, Texas, where they provide meals for 10,000 people each year.

Hobbs collaborated with other Tejano artists for a free concert aimed at senior citizens held at the Bayfront Plaza Convention Center on February 20, 2000. In 2006, Joe Lopez (of Mazz) received a prison sentence of 20 years for multiple counts of sexual assault of a minor. He became eligible for parole on October 26, 2016. In June 2016, Hobbs took part in a fundraising dance event to assist Lopez's parole appeal. In 2019, Hobbs received recognition from the Texas State Legislature, represented by Poncho Nevarez, for his contributions to Tejano music. In 2021, Hobbs appeared as a guest artist on Tejano America, a program sponsored by AARP. In April 2023, Hobbs delivered a live performance at the Baile Del Sol, a free concert held in Brownsville, Texas.

== Discography ==
- Muy Caliente (1983)
- Maniac (1984)
- Mentiras (1985)
- Salvame (1986)
- Miradas (1990)
- Solo Esta Noche (1992)
- Te Vas A Acordar (1993)
- Soy el Mismo (1995)
- Ardiente (1996)
- Sólo Es Un Sueño (1997)
- Mirame A Mi (1998)
- Después De Ti (1999)
- XVII Sueno (2000)
- Ayer y Hoy (2004)
- Esperando Tu Llamada (2005)
- Por Ti (2006)
- Recuerdo...De Mi Madre (2016)
- Lo Que Amo (2019)
- Sin Fin (2022)

== See also ==
- List of Hispanic and Latino Americans
- Music of Texas

== Works cited ==
- Patoski, Joe Nick (May 1995). "The Queen is Dead". Texas Monthly. 23 (5). Gale A16947798 – via Gale Research.
- Lannert, John (June 10, 1995). "Latin highs and lows: label execs agree business is good, differ on areas for improvement". Billboard. Vol. 107, no. 23. Gale A17157530 – via Gale Research.
- Burr, Ramiro (March 20, 1999). "Tejano Stars Reyna And Pulido Shine At First TEMA Awards". Billboard. Vol. 111, no. 12. Gale A54141706 – via Gale Research.
- Lannert, John (July 3, 1999). "BMI Honors Latin Writers, Pub. Cos". Billboard. Vol. 111, no. 27. Gale A55116842 – via Gale Research.
- "Tejano America, Tex-Mex Music and Culture Lifestyle Web Series, Returns for Season 2". Business Wire. May 27, 2021. Gale A663266075 – via Gale Research.
- Ragland, Cathy (February 27, 1996). "Tejano tips hat to conjunto; Award nominations for accordion-led bands". Austin American-Statesman. Gale A72921644 – via Gale Research.
- Ragland, Cathy (April 30, 1996). "Top Tejano songwriters win awards". Austin American-Statesman. Gale A67394256 – via Gale Research.
- Point, Michael (July 30, 1996). "La Diferenzia kicks crowd into frenzy". Austin American-Statesman. Gale A67364070 – via Gale Research.
- Riemenschneider, Chris (March 3, 1997). "Selena still shines, Late star's music, family dominate Tejano Music Awards". Austin American-Statesman. Gale A67258815 – via Gale Research.
- "Texas House Resolution 1937 Honoring Gary Hobbs for his contributions to Tejano music Filed". US Official News. May 23, 2019. Gale A586589482 – via Gale Research.
- "Victoria Advocate Ad Space". Victoria Advocate. June 3, 1983.
- "1983 Tejano Music Award Nominees". The Monitor. November 30, 1983.
- "Tejano Awards Winners". The Monitor. December 4, 1983.
- "La Mafia Wins Top Awards". Corpus Christi Caller-Times. March 27, 1984.
- "Chicano Music Awards Monday". Corpus Christi Caller-Times. March 25, 1984.
- "1984 Tejano Music Award Nominees". The Monitor. March 25, 1984.
- Peterson, Nita (February 26, 1988). "Music Awards Show Set". Corpus Christi Caller-Times.
- "1989 Tejano Music Awards Nominations". San Angelo Standard-Times. January 20, 1989.
- Palomares, Hortensia (September 1, 1989). "Studio Founder Hopes to Forge Artistic Bonds". Austin American-Statesmen.
- Jaklewicz, Greg (December 29, 1989). "Nominations Announced for Tejano Music Awards". Abilene Reporter News.
- "Victoria Advocate Ad Space". Victoria Advocate. January 18, 1990.
- Kestler, Lisa (April 27, 1990). "Red Hot Bands at Cinco de Mayo". Fort Worth Star-Telegram.
- "Tejano Singles > December 13, 1990". Austin American Statesman. December 13, 1990.
- "Tejano Singles > December 20, 1990". Austin American Statesman. December 20, 1990.
- "Tejano Singles > January 24, 1991". Austin American Statesman. January 24, 1991.
- "Tejano Singles > January 31, 1991". Austin American Statesman. January 31, 1991.
- "Tejano Singles > February 7, 1991". Austin American Statesman. February 7, 1991.
- "Tejano Singles > March 14, 1991". Austin American Statesman. March 14, 1991.
- "Tejano Singles > March 21, 1991". Austin American Statesman. March 21, 1991.
- "Tejano Singles > May 16, 1991". Austin American Statesman. May 16, 1991.
- "Tejano Singles > June 13, 1991". Austin American Statesman. June 13, 1991.
- "Tejano Singles > June 20, 1991". Austin American Statesman. June 20, 1991.
- "On Tap". The Monitor. July 26, 1991.
- "Nominees for 1992 Tejano Music Awards". Times Record News. January 12, 1992.
- "Tejano Singles > August 20, 1992". Austin American Statesman. August 20, 1992.
- Cabrera, Rene (August 21, 1992). "La Mafia's Getting Plenty of Airplay With Album, Single 'Alas de Papel'". Corpus Christi Caller-Times.
- "Nominees for 1993 Tejano Music Awards". El Paso Times. December 11, 1992.
- Cabrera, Rene (December 11, 1992). "Traditional Christmas Music, Tejano Style". Corpus Christi Caller-Times.
- Burr, Ramiro (April 9, 1993). "Indie Record Label Out to Compete With the Big Boys". El Paso Times.
- "Tejano Singles > April 1, 1993". Austin American Statesman. April 1, 1993.
- "Tejano Singles > February 3, 1994". Austin American Statesman. February 3, 1994.
- Maldonado, Vilma (March 21, 1994). "A Novela Approach". The Monitor.
- Faidley, Rosa L. (April 17, 1994). "Group Appreciate Help". Victoria Advocate.
- Burr, Ramiro (June 16, 1994). "Santana Clan Strings Together". Austin American Statesman.
- Cabrera, Rene (August 5, 1994). "TV Show Targets Tejanos". Corpus Christi Caller-Times.
- Maldonado, Vilma (August 5, 1994). "Lucia Mendez Returns to TV in 'Senora Tentacion'". The Monitor.
- Cabrera, Rene (January 27, 1995). "Selena, Zamora Among Music Awards Finalists". Corpus Christi Caller-Times.
- Tarradell, Mario (February 4, 1995). "Selena Expected to Win Big in Tejano Music Awards". The Monitor.
- Maldonado, Vilma (March 10, 1995). "Pura Vida Hispanic Music Awards Set for June 6". The Monitor.
- Maldonado, Vilma (May 26, 1995). "Gary Hobbs Dons New Look With 'Soy el Mismo'". The Monitor.
- Burr, Ramiro (June 23, 1995). "2 New Tejano Releases Sure to Impress". Fort Worth Star-Telegram.
- "Short Cuts". The Monitor. October 3, 1995.
- Jaklewicz, Greg (December 29, 1995). "New Year's Eve Has a Live Music Tone". Abilene Reporter News.
- Burr, Ramiro (January 26, 1996). "Vina Del Mar Music Festival To Air Today". Fort Worth Star-Telegram.
- Cabrera, Rene (February 16, 1996). "Emilio Brings His Tejano Side to Coastal Bend". Corpus Christi Caller-Times.
- Cabrera, Rene (July 19, 1996). "Hobbs Back Up to Standard in 'Corazon Ardiente'". Corpus Christi Caller-Times.
- Cabrera, Rene (December 20, 1996). "Tejano Music Awards Nominees". Corpus Christi Caller-Times.
- Cabrera, Rene (May 16, 1997). "La Diferenzia in Kingsville Tonight". Corpus Christi Caller-Times.
- Cabrera, Rene (November 14, 1997). "Gary Hobbs at Yellow Rose Saturday". Corpus Christi Caller-Times.
- Maldonado, Vilma (December 8, 1997). "Changing Trends Undermine Music Promoter's Empire". The Monitor.
- Garcia, Gus (February 25, 1998). "Gary Hobbs Slated for Doc Holidays This Friday". Del Rio News Herald.
- Maldonado, Vilma (April 3, 1998). "The 'Return' of Ricky Martin; Gary Hobbs, Others Release New Albums". The Monitor.
- Jaklewicz, Greg (September 25, 1998). "Chinese Acrobats Here in January". Abilene Reporter-News.
- Cabrera, Rene (December 18, 1998). "Accordion Fever". Corpus Christi Caller-Times.
- Cabrera, Rene (March 19, 1999). "Tejano". Corpus Christi Caller-Times.
- Cabrera, Rene (January 7, 2000). "Tonka Velasquez Group Emphasizes Harmony". Corpus Christi Caller-Times.
- Cabrera, Rene (February 18, 2000). "Conjunto Action Fills Naranjo Memorial Fest". Corpus Christi Caller-Times.
- "Music Charts > March 17, 2000". Abilene Reporter-News. March 17, 2000.
- Murphy, Brien (August 4, 2000). "Even Sans Depot, There's Plenty Going On". Abilene Reporter-News.
- Rodriguez, Helena (August 4, 2000). "Who Has The Best Wheels? Find Out At the Back to School Car Show Sunday". Abilene Reporter-News.
- Rodriguez, Helena (November 19, 2000). "Ruben Ramos, Gary Hobbs to Give Pre-Thanksgiving Concert". Abilene Reporter-News.
- Santos-Garza, Vanessa (December 25, 2000). "Feast of Sharing Serves About 9,500". Corpus Christi-Caller Times.
- Murphy, Brien (February 9, 2001). "A Feast For the Ears This Weekend, Wherever You Go". Abilene Reporter-News.
- Murphy, Brien (May 18, 2001). "Hobbs Headlines Live Music Lineup". Abilene Reporter-News.
- Murphy, Brien (August 3, 2001). "Undiscovered Country Singers Shoot for Stardom in Stephenville". Abilene Reporter-News.
- "Music Charts > September 7, 2001". Abilene Reporter-News. September 7, 2001.
- Rodriguez, Helena (April 26, 2002). "Hispanic Guide Plans Anniversary Dance". Abilene Reporter-News.
- Brambila, Nicole C. (September 19, 2002). "Gary Hobbs To Release Next CD in SA". San Angelo Standard-Times.
- Ybarra, Rose (October 10, 2003). "Tejano Artist Gary Hobbs to Perform at Graham". The Monitor.
- Ybarra, Rose (March 19, 2005). "25th Silver Anniversary Tejano Music Awards Nominees". The Monitor.
- Leo, Barbi; Pena, Dan (July 7, 2006). "Hobbs Flavors New Release With His Signature Sound". Corpus Christi Caller-Times.
- Acosta, Sarah (September 23, 2011). "Honoring Tejano Giants". Corpus Christi Caller-Times.
- Martinez, Eduardo (December 11, 2015). "Three Christmas Albums to Look Out for this Season". The Monitor.
- "Charro Days Were a Success". The Brownsville Herald. June 4, 2023.
- Medina, Rudy (February 23, 1997). "Rudy Medina interviewing Gary Hobbs". La Prensa. ProQuest 368599028.
- "Gary Hobbs firma con Sony Discos". La Prensa. December 21, 1997. ProQuest 368597503.
- Banks, Suzy (December 2000). "50 gifts yule love". Texas Monthly. 28 (12). ProQuest 226960176.
- "Gary Hobbs to appear at Eastside Cantina, May 5". La Prensa. May 5, 2023t. ProQuest 2812789662.
- de la Torre, Chito (March 3, 1995). "Chito's Spotlights". La Prensa. ProQuest 368637400.
- Candelaria, Cordelia (2004). Encyclopedia of Latino popular culture. 1: A–L (1st ed.). Greenwood Press. ISBN 9780313332104.
- Quesada, Uriel; Gomez, Letitia; Vidal-Ortiz, Salvador (2015). Queer brown voices: personal narratives of Latina-o LGBT activism (1st ed.). University of Texas Press. ISBN 9781477302347.
- Burr, Ramiro (1999). The Billboard Guide to Tejano and Regional Mexican Music (1st ed.). Billboard Books. ISBN 0823076911.
- "The Year in Music". Billboard. Vol. 106, no. 52. December 24, 1994.
- Verna, Paul (April 1, 1995). "Album Reviews". Billboard. Vol. 107, no. 13.
- "Hot Latin Songs > May 20, 1995". Billboard. Vol. 107, no. 20. May 20, 1995.
- "Hot Latin Songs > September 16, 1995". Billboard. Vol. 107, no. 37. September 16, 1995.
- "Hot Latin Songs > February 11, 1995". Billboard. Vol. 107, no. 6. February 11, 1995.
- "1998 BMI Songwriter Awards". Billboard. Vol. 110, no. 36. September 16, 1998.
- Medina, John Henry (June 13, 2016). "Benefit for Joe Lopez planned at Far West San Antonio on June 16". Tejano Nation.
- Peaches, Dj (May 6, 2017). "Gary Hobbs talks upcoming projects, musical influences [VIDEO]". Tejano Nation.
- Gurl, Fanny (May 6, 2017). "Gary Hobbs talks latest album, upcoming single + more [VIDEO]". Tejano Nation.
- Peaches, Dj (September 29, 2017). "Da Krazy Pimpz bring conjunto fusion to Arizona [VIDEO]". Tejano Nation.
- Medina, John Henry (October 5, 2017). "Top 5 Nominees Announced for 37th Tejano Music Awards". Tejano Nation.
- Cruz, A. C. (September 24, 2019). "Gary Hobbs shares details on new album 'Eres Lo Que Amo', legendary career and more [PODCAST]". Tejano Nation.
- Medina, John Henry (August 7, 2019). "Gary Hobbs says 'new music coming soon' in social media photo". Tejano Nation.
- Medina, John Henry (September 24, 2019). "Gary Hobbs drops highly-anticipated new single 'Lo Que Amo' from upcoming album [AUDIO]". Tejano Nation.
- Medina, John Henry (July 19, 2019). "Rick Fuentes releases duet with Arturo Montes as lead single from 'Tribute' album". Tejano Nation.
- Medina, John Henry (April 17, 2020). "Gary Hobbs releases uplifting ranchera 'Tu Eres Mi Reina' [AUDIO]". Tejano Nation.
- Medina, John Henry (December 23, 2020). "Shelly Lares, Jay Perez, Stevie D, and JR Gomez top winners at 40th annual Tejano Music Awards featuring virtual performances". Tejano Nation.
- Medina, John Henry (August 26, 2021). "Gary Hobbs to launch 'Hanging with Gary' podcast on Aug. 31". Tejano Nation.
- Medina, John Henry (April 20, 2022). "Gary Hobbs signs with Freddie Records". Tejano Nation.
- Medina, John Henry (December 21, 2022). "Gary Hobbs shares details on 'Sin Fin,' highly-anticipated debut album with Freddie Records". Tejano Nation.
- Medina, John Henry (September 8, 2022). "Kary Karina and Gary Hobbs share personal connection on 'Que Lastima' collaboration". Tejano Nation.
- Medina, John Henry (April 21, 2023). "Gary Hobbs premieres 'Que Daría' music video". Tejano Nation.
- Medina, John Henry (February 10, 2023). "Top 5 Nominees Announced for Third Annual Premios Tejano Mundial in San Antonio on March 5". Tejano Nation.
- Medina, John Henry (October 21, 2023). "43rd Tejano Music Awards: Siggno, Mike Gonzalez & The Iconiczz among big winners". Tejano Nation.
