= Tejano Music Award for Songwriter of the Year =

Tejano music industry achievement award

- Awarded for: Songwriter of the Year
- Country: United States
- Presented by: Texas Talent Association
- First award: 1981
- Final award: 1992

Highlights
- Most awards: Luis Silva (7)
- Website: Tejano Music Awards

The Tejano Music Award for Songwriter of the Year is an honor presented to songwriters within the Tejano music market. The Tejano Music Awards, first bestowed in 1981, was established to recognize the most talented performers of the genre—a subcategory of regional Mexican music, with roots in the music of early European settlers in Texas. The awards are presented by the Texas Talent Musicians Association (TTMA), to "promote excellence in the Tejano music industry" using the popular vote method to select the winner of best songwriter of the year. The award was established by Rick Trevino, a Tejano performer, who founded the Awards in 1981.

The award was first presented to Carlos Cadenas in 1981 and last awarded to Joe Lopez in 1992. Luis Silva is the most awarded songwriter, winning the award for seven consecutive years starting in 1983. The award was removed following a dispute between Sony Discos, Freddie Records, Fonovisa, and TH-Rodven, with the Tejano Music Awards, who noticed EMI Latin's artists winning most of the categories at the 1990 and 1991 Tejano Music Awards. The record labels prevented La Mafia and Joe Lopez from attending and receiving their awards at the 1992 Tejano Music Awards despite the association's overhaul of the awards months prior to the event.

== Recipients ==
Year	Songwriter	Nominees	Ref.
1981	Carlos Cadenas	Luévano Marentes, Johnny Herrera	
1982	Johnny Herrera	Luis Silva	
1983	Luis Silva	Johnny Herrera, Salome Gutierrez	
1984	Luis Silva		
1985	Luis Silva	Juan H. Barron, Javier Canales	
1986	Luis Silva	Juan H. Barron, Homer Hernandez	
1987	Luis Silva	Joe Lopez, Rene Serrata	
1988	Luis Silva	Ruly Aguiree	
1989	Luis Silva	Romero Aguilar, Joe B. "King" Carrasco, Roger Contreras, Homer Hernandez, Joe Lopez, A.B. Quintanilla, Joe Revelez, Rosbel Ruiz, Rene Serrata, Ruly Aguiree, Juan Solis	
1990	Joe Lopez	Luis Silva, Joe Revelez	
1991	Joe Lopez	Luis Silva, Joe Revelez	
1992	Joe Lopez	Luis Silva, Johnny Perez, Raul Navaira, Humberto Ramon, Geraldo Olvera, Ello Quintanilla, Maria Luisa G. Ramirez, Roger Contreras, A.B. Quintanilla, Richard Allen, David Reveles	

== See also ==
- Music of Texas
