= Sólo para Ti =

Studio album by Mazz
- Released: September 12, 1995
- Studio: Zaz Recording Complex, San Antonio, Texas; Blue Cat Recording, San Antonio, Texas
- Genre: Tejano; cumbia; ranchera; conjunto; mariachi; polka
- Language: Spanish, English
- Label: EMI Latin
- Producer: Jimmy González

Mazz chronology
Regalo de Navidad (1994)	Sólo para Ti (1995)	Mazz Mariachi y Tradición (1996)

Singles from Sólo para Ti
- 1. "Estúpido Romántico" Released: 1995

Sólo para Ti (English: Only for You) is the twenty-fifth studio album by Mazz and was released on September 12, 1995 with EMI Latin. The album was named Hot Shot Debut at #4 on the Billboard Latin 50 chart. It contains the cumbia hit "Estúpido Romántico", which peaked at #6 on Billboard Hot Latin Tracks, and other popular Mazz songs "Amigo Mio", "Vuelve Conmigo", and "Más y Más".

== Production ==
"Vuelve Conmigo" is backed up by Tejano singer Rebecca Valadez, who later also worked with Mazz co-founder Jimmy González and his iteration of Mazz after the original group's 1998 disbanding. Music videos were recorded for "Estúpido Romántico" and "Más y Más". Sólo para Ti also contains a reinterpretation of the then especially popular dance song "Macarena" and a "remixed" (or potentially re-recorded) version of "Traicionera", a ranchera Mazz previously recorded for their 1993 album Mazz Románticos Que Nunca, in a sort of hip-hop style.

The EMI Times commented that Sólo para Ti "represents the group's natural style and maturity", with Mazz lead singer Joe López adding that it "has more arrangements, more percussion and [...] is more thought out".

== Track listing ==
No.	Title	Writer(s)	Length
1.	"Estúpido Romántico"	Pete Astudillo; Ricky Vela	4:35
2.	"Vuelve Conmigo"	Humberto Ramón	4:29
3.	"Más y Más"	Joe López	3:53
4.	"Quisiera"	Ramón	3:30
5.	"Amigo Mio"	Horacio Lanzi	4:13
6.	"Sentimientos Medley: Para Que/Inocente Pobre Amigo/La Farsante"	Juan Gabriel	7:37
7.	"Tu"	López	4:19
8.	"Macarena"	Rafael Ruiz	3:32
9.	"Killer G's Medley: Lo Que Quisiera/Por una Mala Mujer/Cruz de Madera"	Marco Antonio Solís/Los Dos Gilbertos/Ramiro Aguilar	6:00
10.	"Sin Tu Amor"	Ramón	3:41
11.	"Love of My Life"	Ramón	3:25
12.	"Traicionera (Remix)"	López; Kenneth Saldaña	4:04

== Personnel ==
- Jimmy González – producer, arrangements, guitar, backing vocals, mixing assistant
- Joe López – lead vocals
- Brando Mireles – keyboards
- Jerry de la Rosa – keyboards
- Mario González – bass
- Speedy Villanueva – bass
- Adolfo García – drums
- Chente Barrera – drums
- Richard Barrón – percussion
- Homero Esquivel – accordion
- Frankie Caballero – accordion
- Tommy González – saxophone
- Rebecca Valadez – backing vocals
- Betty – backing vocals
- Mike Pesina – voice-over intro
- Master "Mixin'" Mando – remixing and production of "Traicionera (Remix)"
- Kenneth Saldaña – rap lyrics and rap for "Traicionera (Remix)"
- Gilbert Velasquez – recording engineer, mixing, guitar
- Chuy Cavazos – additional engineering
- Jorge Infante Jr. – additional engineering
- Jerry Tubb – mastering
- Ruben S. Cubillos – art direction
- Creative Solutions – design
- Robert López – photography
- John McBurney – makeup
- Ms. Emily – hairstyles

== Awards ==
Tejano Music Awards
Year	Category
1996	Album of the Year (Orchestra)

BMI Award-Winning Songs
Estúpido Romántico
Amigo Mio

== Chart performance ==
Sólo para Ti
Week of	Chart	Peak
September 30, 1995	Billboard Top Latin Albums	4
September 30, 1995	Billboard Regional Mexican Albums	2

"Estúpido Romántico"
Week of	Chart	Peak
September 30, 1995	Billboard Hot Latin Tracks	6
October 28, 1995	Billboard Regional Mexican Airplay	4

== Release history ==
Region	Date	Label	Format	Catalog
United States	September 12, 1995	EMI Latin	CD	H2 7243 8 30913 2 4
United States	September 12, 1995	EMI Latin	cassette	H4 7243 8 30913 4 8
United States	1995	EMI Latin	club CD	H2 530913
United States	2011	Capitol Latin	reissued CD	509999 47601 2 5
