= Luis Silva (songwriter) =

American singer-songwriter (1943–2008)

Luis Silva (November 5, 1943 – October 22, 2008) was a Tejano music songwriter, considered by music critics to have been one of the "most well-known and prolific songwriters in the history of Tejano music" and "one of the most influential and prolific songwriters and record label promoters in Tejano music history". Silva wrote two winning Tejano Music Awards for Song of the Year, won three consecutive times for Songwriter of the Year, and remains the most awarded songwriter for the Tejano Music Award for Single of the Year category. He is part of the American Society of Composers, Authors and Publishers (ASCAP), and his songwriting career spanned three decades and included a roster from Ram Herrera, Mazz, La Mafia, David Marez, among others.

== Career ==
Recordings written by Silva include "Boulevard de Suenos" (Fama), "Te Voy a ensenar a Querer" (Gary Hobbs), "Entre mas Lejos me Vaya," (David Marez), "Borracho de Besos," (La Fiebre); "Laura Ya No Vive Aquí," "Ahora Quiero que me Quieras", "Ayer y Hoy", and "No quiero Olvidarte Otra Vez" (Mazz). In 1985, Silva wrote "Somos Hermanos" for the Hunger Aid campaign.

Silva also helped kickstart the careers of La Mafia and Mazz. He is considered to have also begin the Tejano renaissance era in the 1990s, during which the genre entered the mainstream market. In 2007, Silva was inducted into the Premis a La Musica Latina Hall of Fame. Silva previously worked at Freddie Records.

== Death ==
Silva died of a heart attack after having dinner with his daughter on October 22, 2008, in Dallas, Texas. According to his daughter, Silva had visited her to see her new house and that after going out for dinner Silva's condition began to deteriorate. Silva laughed it off and continued to tour his daughter's house, when Silva entered one of the bedrooms, he sat down and his daughter noticed his eyes rolled up, she tried to hold him but couldn't because of his weight, she subsequently called the emergency responders; but said he immediately died after the responders arrived.

== Popular culture ==
In Netflix's Selena: The Series, Silva is portrayed by Joe Lorenzo.

== Notes ==
- San Miguel, Guadalupe (2002). Tejano Proud: Tex-Mex Music in the Twentieth Century. Texas A&M University Press. ISBN 1585441880. - Read online, registration required
