= La Sombra (band) =

American Tejano band

- Also known as: La Sombra de Tony Guerrero La Sombra de Chicago
- Origin: Aurora, Illinois, United States
- Genres: Tejano/Tex-Mex, cumbia, hip hop, rock, soul
- Years active: 1970s–1990s, 2008, Present
- Labels: International Recording Company/IRC (1977-1981), Freddie Records (1984-1990), Fonovisa Records (1991-1994), EMI Latin (1995-1997)

La Sombra, also known as La Sombra de Tony Guerrero and previously known as La Sombra de Chicago, is a Tejano band founded by Antonio "Tony" Guerrero Jr. Originally from the Chicago suburb of Aurora, Illinois, the group gained national acclaim and success after moving to Corpus Christi, Texas and signing with Freddie Records.

La Sombra released over twenty full-length studio albums featuring songs in both Spanish and English. Following numerous line-up changes, the group disbanded in 1995, briefly reuniting in 2008 for a number of live shows.

La Sombra has been credited with influencing the Tejano music fields in terms of musical style, dress, and concert performances as well as a generation of newer artists.

== Select discography ==
=== Studio albums ===
- Mi Guerita Coca-Cola (1982)
- Where's the Beef? (1983)
- No Hay Derecho (1984)
- Eres Tu Muchachita (1984)
- Sombra Love (1985)
- Botoncito De Cariño (1985)
- All I Could Do Was Cry (1986)
- From the Streets of Chicago (1987)
- La Sombra Introduces La Rebeldia (1987)
- Strikes Again (1988)
- Chicago's Wild Side (1988)
- One of a Kind (1989)
- The Chi-Town Boys R Back (1989)
- Good Boys Wear White (1990)
- Porque Te Quiero (1991)
- Intocable (1992)
- Ilusiones (1993)
- Caliente Dulce Amor (1994)
- Mas Que Todo (1995)
- Alborotados (1997)
- Todo Me Recuerda A Ti (1999)

=== Compilations ===
- Come Together (1985)
- Double Shot (1988)
- Greatest Hits Vol. 1 (1990)
- Greatest Hits Vol. 2 (1991)
- Awesome (1991)
- The Greatest Show On Earth (1991)
- Lo Mejor (1993)
- 10th Anniversary (1994)
- Our Very Best (1995)
- Las Mejores Cumbias (1995)
- 30 Greatest Hits (1997)
- 30 Greatest Hits Vol. 2 (2000)
- In Concert (2001)
- 30 Greatest Hits Vol. 3 (2002)
- The Original Recordings (2004)
- Mano A Mano (2004)
- 20 Exitos De Recuerdo (2005)
- The Original Recordings 2 (2005)
- Anthology (2007)
- Battle of The 80s (2008)

== Band members ==
- Antonio "Tony" Guerrero Jr. - lead vocals, background vocals, accordion
- Cruz Guerrero - keyboards, background vocals
- Lorenzo "Chencho" Benavides - lead vocals (1977- 1981)
- Jesse Huerta - drums, background vocals (1977-1995)
- Jose "Pepper" Gonzales - guitar (1978-1993)
- Harvey Gonzales - bass guitar, background vocals (1978-1995)
- Gavino Guerrero - lead vocals, background vocals, trumpet (1979-1994)
- Rene Limas - keyboards (1984-1987)
- Frankie Treviño - guitar (1985-1987)
- Albert "Tiger" Diaz - trumpet, saxophone, background vocals (1985-1989)
- Alex "Chuco" Gutierrez - keyboards, vocals
- Ceaser Mojica - keyboards, vocals (1988)
- Alex "Pretty Boy" Ramirez - keyboards, accordion (1989-1995)
- Jesse Colon - trumpet (1981-1984)
- Cruz Martínez - keyboard (1989-1996)
- Joel Garza - drums (1994-1995)
- Bobby Rios - bass guitar and vocals (1996-)
- Joe Eric Griego - drums (1997)
- Rene Ximenez - drums (1999, 2000, 2009, 2010)
- Ray Talamantez Jr. - trumpet, saxophone, vocals
- Rogelio Zavala Jr. - Keyboards, vocals
- Adam Vargas - guitar
- Andrew Maes - background vocals
- Roland Gutierrez - keyboards

== Awards and nominations ==
Year	Award	Category	Work	Result	Ref.
1985	Tejano Music Awards	Most Promising Band of the Year	La Sombra	Won	
1990	Tejano Music Awards	Single of the Year	"El Sapo"	Nominated	
1991	Tejano Music Awards	Album of the Year – Orchestra	Good Boys	Nominated	
1991	Tejano Music Awards	Song of the Year	"El Sapo"	Nominated	
1991	Tejano Music Awards	Single of the Year	"A Donde Vas" "El Sapo"	Nominated	
1992	Grammy Awards	Best Mexican-American Album	Porque Te Quiero	Nominated	
1992	Premio Lo Nuestro	Regional Mexican Group of the Year	La Sombra	Nominated	
2017	Tejano Roots Hall of Fame		Tony Guerrero	Inducted	
2017	Tejano Music Awards	Male Vocalist of the Year	Tony Guerrero	Nominated	
2017	Tejano Music Awards	Song of the Year	"Mi Cumbia"	Nominated	
2017	Tejano Music Awards	Album of the Year – Tejano	Look Who's Back	Nominated	
