= Una Noche Juntos: Live =

Live album by Mazz
- Released: October 5, 1991
- Recorded: June 23, 1991
- Venues: Rosedale Park, San Antonio, Texas
- Studios: Reel Sound, Austin, Texas; Pro Sound Studio, McAllen, Texas
- Genres: Tejano; cumbia; ranchera; polka
- Language: Spanish
- Label: Capitol/EMI Latin
- Producers: Jimmy González; Gilbert Velásquez

Mazz chronology
Para Nuestra Gente (1990)	Una Noche Juntos: Live (1991)	Lo Haré Por Ti (1992)

Una Noche Juntos: Live (English: One Night Together: Live; released in Mexico as En vivo... contigo en un baile) is the first and only live album by the American Tejano band Mazz, released on October 5, 1991, by Capitol/EMI Latin. It was recorded on June 23, 1991 at Rosedale Park in San Antonio, Texas before a sold-out attendance of 9000.

Una Noche Juntos was released in America on dual–vinyl record, dual–compact disc, and cassette tape. All editions in the American market were marked on their covers as "Collector's Editions," though there were not any editions that were not that in that market. Una Noche Juntos was the last album by Mazz that was released on vinyl in the United States.

The album also included two studio-recorded tracks, "Demasiado Herido" and "Que Me Lleven Canciones," which for the vinyl and compact disc editions, appeared as the last tracks on the dual-mediums. "Que Me Lleven Canciones" won Mazz Song of the Year at the 1992 Tejano Music Awards.

== Track listing ==
No.	Title	Writer(s)	Length
1.	"Ven Devorame Otra Vez"	Palmer Hernández
2.	"Vamos a Olvidarnos"	Joe López
3.	"Soy Como Soy"	López
4.	"Pero No"	López
5.	"¿Por Qué Dios Mio?"	M. Flores
6.	"Amor con Amor"	Macias
7.	"Mazz Polkitas"
8.	"No Te Olvidaré"	López
9.	"Demasiado Herido"	M. A. Valenzuela; A. Martino
10.	"Canciones del Corazon"	J. A. Jimenez; F. Mendez; G. Parra; F. Z. Maldonado
11.	"Gabino Barrera"	Victor Cordero
12.	"¿Qué Ganas?"	López
13.	"Mazz Cumbias"
14.	"Laura"	Humberto Ramón
15.	"Reprise"	Palmer Hernández
16.	"Mazz: Jam Show Closer"	Mazz
17.	"Que Me Lleven Canciones"	Ramón

The Mexican release En vivo... contigo en un baile differed in the following ways:

- Tracks 5, 9, 10, 13, and 16 were not included (probably because in Mexico the album was released in a single instead of dual format, e.g. one cassette and not a dual set)
- Track 7 was titled "Polkitas del Tigre", the medley's original title when released in No Te Olvidaré (1990)
- Track 15 is simply called "Ven Devorame Otra Vez"

== Personnel ==
- Brando Mireles – keyboards
- Jimmy González – electric guitar, acoustic guitar, vocals
- Adolfo García – drums
- Alfonso González – accordion
- Tommy González – saxophone, congas
- Mario González – bass guitar
- Joe López – lead vocals
- Gilbert Velásquez – mixing engineer
- Mariachi Campanas de America – "Canciones del Corazon"
- Agnes Torres – backing vocals for "No Te Olvidaré"
- Abel "A. C." Chavarria – Master of Ceremony
- Ruben S. Cubillos – art direction
- Al Rendon – photography
- Creative Solutions – design, typography
