= 1993 Tejano Music Awards =

13th Tejano Music Awards
- March 12th, 1993
- Sponsored by: Budweiser
- Location: HemisFair Arena - San Antonio, Texas
- Country: United States
- First award: 1980

Television/radio coverage
- Network: KSAT 12

The 13th Tejano Music Awards were held on March 12th, 1993 at the HemisFair Arena in San Antonio Texas. They recognized accomplishments by musicians from the previous year in the Tejano genre. The Tejano Music Awards is an annual awards ceremony recognizing Tejano music musicians.

== Award winners ==
=== Vocalists of The Year ===
- Male Vocalist of The Year
  - David Marez
- Female Vocalist of The Year
  - Selena

=== Vocal Duo Of the Year ===
- Emilio Navaira and Raul Navaira

=== Albums of the Year ===
- Orchestra (Entre a Mi Mundo by Selena)
- Progressive (Unsung Highways by Emilio Navaira)
- Traditional (Right on Track by La Tropa F)

=== Songs of The Year ===
- Song of The Year
  - Lo Voy Hacer Por Ti by Mazz
- Single of The Year
  - Lo Voy Hacer Por Ti by Mazz
- Tejano Country Song of The Year
  - She's Not Alone by David Lee Garza y Los Musicales

=== Entertainers of the Year ===
- Male Entertainer of The Year
  - Emilio Navaira
- Female Entertainer of The Year
  - Selena

=== Most Promising Band of The Year ===
- Culturas

=== Showband of The Year ===
- David Lee Garza y Los Musicales

== See also ==
- Tejano Music Awards
