= Qué Esperabas =

Studio album by Mazz
- Released: 1993
- Studio: ZAZ Studio Complex (San Antonio, Texas); Pro Sound Studio (McAllen, Texas)
- Genre: Tejano; ranchera; ballad
- Length: 36:47
- Language: Spanish, English
- Label: EMI Latin
- Producer: Jimmy González

Mazz chronology
Mazz Románticos Que Nunca (1993)	Qué Esperabas (1993)	Regalo de Navidad (1994)

Alternative cover
- 2011 Capitol Records rerelease

Singles from Qué Esperabas
- 1. "El Juego Es Tuyo" Released: 1994

Qué Esperabas is the twenty-third studio album by American Tejano band Mazz. It was released in 1993 by EMI Latin, shortly after Mazz's "banda-laced LP, Mazz Romanticos Que Nunca, failed to ignite Texas fans." It contains the hits "Qué Esperabas", "Acaso No Soy", "Ya Te Olvide", and "Mi Corazon y Yo".

== Track listing ==
No.	Title	Writer(s)	Length
1.	"Qué Esperabas"	Fernando Riba; Kika Campos	3:17
2.	"Que Mal Herida"	Chavez Salinas	3:16
3.	"El Juego Es Tuyo"	Humberto Ramón	3:48
4.	"Asi Es Mi Vida"	Joe López	3:51
5.	"Ya Te Olvide"	Joe Revelez	3:51
6.	"Mi Corazon y Yo"	López	3:58
7.	"Acaso No Soy"	Pete Astudillo	3:33
8.	"Nadie Como Tu"	Lupe Esparza	3:07
9.	"Have I Told You Lately That I Love You?"	Van Morrison	3:50
10.	"Dentro de Tu Corazon"	Jorge Luis Borrego	4:16
Total length:			36:47

== Personnel ==
- Joe López – vocals
- Jimmy González – guitar, vocals, producer, arrangements, mixing assistant
- Brando Mireles – keyboards
- Tommy González – saxophone
- Mario González – bass
- Adolfo García – drums
- Richard Barron – drums, percussion
- Homero Esquivel – accordion
- Jerry de la Rosa – keyboards
- Stephanie Lynn – backing vocals
- Gilbert Velásquez – recording engineer, mixing engineer, acoustic guitar
- Chuy Cavazos – second engineer
- Ruben S. Cubillos – art direction
- Al Rendón – photography
- Creative Solutions – design
- Creative Link – production
- John McBurney – makeup
- Ms. Emily – hair

== Chart position ==
Year	Chart	Peak
1994	Billboard Latin 50	10
1994	Billboard Regional Mexican	4

== Release history ==
Region	Date	Label	Format	Catalog
United States	1993	EMI Latin	CD	H2 7243 8 27738 2 5
United States	1993	EMI Latin	club CD	H2 527738
United States	1993	EMI Latin	cassette	H2 7243 8 27738 4 9
Mexico	1993	EMI	CD	216 7243 8 27738 2 5
United States	2011	Capitol Latin	remastered CD	509999 48559 2 0
