= 1996 Tejano Music Awards =

16th Tejano Music Awards
- Location: San Antonio, Texas
- First award: 1996

The 16th Tejano Music Awards were held in 1996. They recognized accomplishments by musicians from the previous year. The Tejano Music Awards is an annual awards ceremony recognizing Tejano music musicians.

== Award winners ==
=== Vocalists of The Year ===
- Male Vocalist of The Year
  - Emilio Navaira
- Female Vocalist of The Year
  - Selena

=== Vocal Duo Of the Year ===
- Emilio & Raul Navaira

=== Albums of the Year ===
- Orchestra (Solo Para Ti by Mazz)
- Progressive (Sound Life by Emilio Navaira)
- Traditional (Cruz De Madera by Michael Salgado)
- Overall (Dreaming of You by Selena)

=== Songs of The Year ===
- Song of The Year
  - Tu Solo Tu by Selena
- Tejano Crossover
  - I Could Fall in Love by Selena
- Tejano Country Song of The Year
  - It's Not the End of the World by Emilio Navaira
- Instrumental of the Year
  - David Lee's Favorites by David Lee Garza y Los Musicales

=== Entertainers of the Year ===
- Male Entertainer of The Year
  - Emilio Navaira
- Female Entertainer of The Year
  - Selena

=== Most Promising Band of The Year ===
- Pete Astudillo

== See also ==
- Tejano Music Awards
