= 1994 Tejano Music Awards =

14th Annual Tejano Music Awards
- Date: March 13, 1994
- Location: San Antonio, Texas, U.S.

The 14th Annual Tejano Music Awards were held on March 13, 1994, at the Alamodome in San Antonio, Texas. The Tejano Music Awards is an annual awards ceremony recognizing the accomplishments of Tejano music musicians from the prior year.

== Award winners ==
  - Selena Quintanilla

=== Vocalists of The Year ===
- Male Vocalist of The Year
  - Emilio Navaira
- Female Vocalist of The Year
  - Selena

=== Vocal Duo Of the Year ===
- Joe Lopez, Jimmy Gonzalez, Mazz

=== Albums of the Year ===
- Orchestra: Selena Live! by Selena
- Progressive: Southern Exposure by Emilio Navaira
- Traditional: Unrivaled by Los Chamacos

=== Songs of The Year ===
- Song of The Year
  - "La Charanga" by Fandango USA
- Single of The Year
  - "La Charanga" by Fandango USA
- Tejano Country Song of The Year
  - "I've Got A Never Ending Love" by Ram Herrera
- Instrumental of the Year
  - "Posse Polkas" by David Lee Garza Y Los Musicales
- Tejano Music Video of the Year
  - "Lucero De Mi Alma" by Emilio Navaira

=== Entertainers of the Year ===
- Male Entertainer of The Year
  - Emilio Navaira
- Female Entertainer of The Year
  - Selena

=== Most Promising Band of The Year ===
- Estrella

=== Showband of The Year ===
- David Lee Garza y Los Musicales

== See also ==
- Tejano Music Awards
