= 1991 Tejano Music Awards =

11th Tejano Music Awards
- Location: San Antonio, Texas
- First award: 1991

The 11th Tejano Music Awards were held in 1991. They recognized accomplishments by musicians from the previous year. The Tejano Music Awards is an annual awards ceremony recognizing Tejano music musicians.

== Award winners ==
=== Vocalists of The Year ===
- Male Vocalist of The Year
  - Joe Lopez
- Female Vocalist of The Year
  - Selena

=== Vocal Duo Of the Year ===
- Joe Lopez, Jimmy Gonzalez and Mazz

=== Albums of the Year ===
- Orchestra (No Te Olvidare)
- Conjunto (Sensaciones)
- Traditional (Mi Accordeon Y Yo by Ramón Ayala)

=== Songs of The Year ===
- Song of The Year
  - No Te Olvidare by Mazz
- Single of The Year
  - Amor Con Amor by Mazz
- Tejano Country Song of The Year
  - She's Not Alone by David Lee Garza y Los Musicales

=== Entertainers of the Year ===
- Male Entertainer of The Year
  - Emilio Navaira
- Female Entertainer of The Year
  - Selena

=== Most Promising Band of The Year ===
- Joe Lopez

=== Song-writer of The Year ===
- La Fiebre

== See also ==
- Tejano Music Awards
