= Los Barón de Apodaca =

- Origin: Apodaca, Nuevo León, Mexico
- Genres: Mexican cumbia, Ranchera, Bolero, Latin ballad
- Years active: 1978–1995, 1999–present
- Members: Javier Cantú; Efrain Flores; Solomon Guajardo; Juan Francisco Martinez; Ubaldo Suárez; Arturo Valadez
- Website: www.barondeapodaca.com

Los Barón de Apodaca are a six-man Mexican cumbia band formed in 1978 in Apodaca, Nuevo León, Mexico. They have a long recording history with several compilations issued by EMI Latin America, and a 30 Aniversario album (2008).

== Members ==
- Javier Cantu – Guitar
- Efrain Flores – Bass
- Solomon Guajardo – Keyboard
- Juan Francisco Martinez – Drums
- Ubaldo Suárez – Lead vocals
- Arturo Valadez – Backing vocals
- Daniel Hernandez (La Cobra) - Audio y Sonido
