= AJ Castillo =

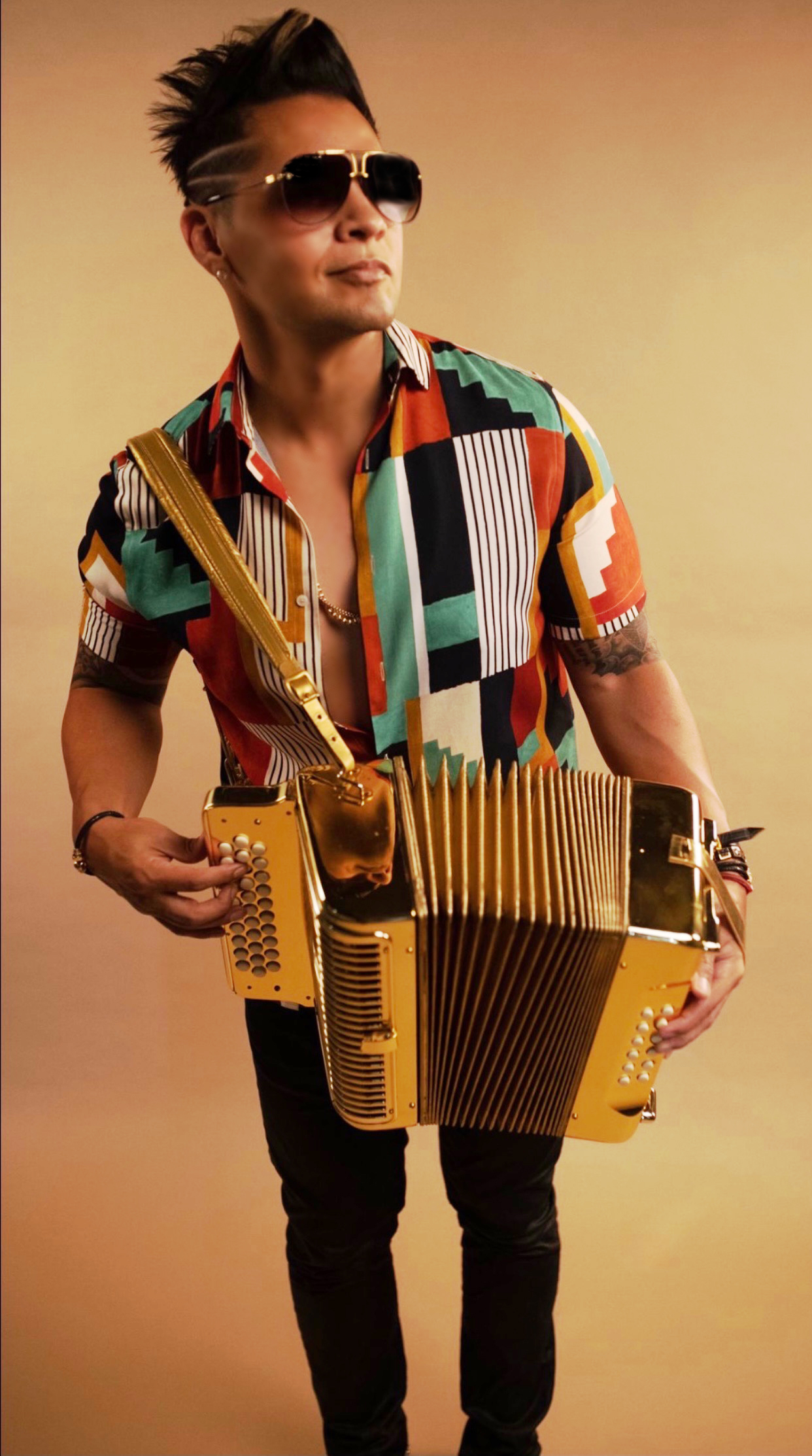
- AJ Castillo in 2021

Background information
- Born: Arturo Castillo, Jr. October 16, 1986 (age 39); Austin, Texas, United States
- Genres: cumbia, Tejano
- Occupations: Musician, Singer, Producer
- Instruments: Accordion, Vocals
- Label: Yungstar Records (independent)
- Website: www.ajcastillo.com/

Arturo Castillo, Jr. (born October 16, 1986, in Austin, Texas), better known as AJ Castillo, is an American singer of Mexican descent. He is a cumbia, and Tejano music recording artist, accordionist, singer, performer, and producer. His debut album, "Who I Am", was released in 2009. His second album, On My Way, was released in 2010. Castillo won Best New Artist – Male at the 2010 Tejano Music Awards.

== Personal life ==
Castillo is a native of Austin, Texas, and is a graduate of the University of Texas at San Antonio, where he was a member of Kappa Sigma fraternity. He was introduced to the accordion by his grandfather and started playing at around the age of 10, and began his professional music career at 13 with his family band.

== Career ==
Castillo spent several years as a studio musician. Once referred to as a "rising star" in the Tejano industry, he has recorded and performed with many of the top Tejano artists in the industry. Castillo is known for his accordion sound and style, and his visually customized accordions. Castillo entered the Tejano scene as a solo artist in 2009 and has brought a "fresh new attitude to Tejano Music". Castillo introduced a fresh new urban/fusion sound (combining influences from Tejano, Cumbias, Jazz, Cajun, and R&B) that expands the boundaries of accordion music and has helped to energize the Tejano scene.

Castillo has released five albums. Castillo performed at the 2009 Tejano Music Awards, and in 2010 accepted his first Tejano Music Awards in 2010, winning Best New Male Artist, Best Accordion Player, and Best Emerging Artist. in 2016, the City of Austin proclaimed September 1 as AJ Castillo Day.

Castillo was featured on Juan Treviño's “Siempre Es Así”, which won the 2017 Latin Grammy Award for Best Regional Song.

== Band members ==
- AJ Castillo - Accordion and Lead Vocals
- Sergio Castillo - Background Vocals
- Jon Everett - Guitar and Bajo Sexto
- Josh Woods - Bass
- Daniel Sandoval Jr - Drums and Percussion
- Arturo Castillo - Alto Sax
- Alex Pulido - Trumpet and Keyboards

== Discography and videography ==
- Who I Am (2009) - features a special guest appearance by Tejano artist Ram Herrera.
- On My Way (2010) introduced Castillo's younger brother, Sergio Castillo, and features special guest appearances by Tejano artists David Lee Garza and Mark Ledesma.
- The MixTape (2011)
- Up Close and Personal DVD (2012)
- The New Movement (2012)
- Sin Límites (2014)
- AJ Castillo LIVE from Tucson, AZ DVD/Blu-Ray (2016)
- AJ Castillo (2018)
- Live From Lubbock Texas (2020)
- An Accordion Christmas EP (2020) - features a special appearance by Grammy Award Winning Contemporary Jazz/R&B artist Norman Brown.

== Awards and recognition ==
- 2010 - Tejano Music Awards Best New Male Artist
- 2010 - Tejano Academy's Best Overall Accordion Player
- 2010 - Tejano Academy's Best Emerging Artist/Group
- 2017 - Latin Grammy Award winning Best Regional Song “Siempre Es Así”
- 2021 Premios Tejano Mundial Entertainer of the Year
- 2021 Tejano All Star Music Awards Male Entertainer of the Year
