= Life Is Good (Emilio album) =

Studio album by Emilio Navaira
- Released: September 26, 1995
- Genre: Country
- Length: 41:06
- Label: Capitol Nashville
- Producer: Barry Beckett

Emilio Navaira chronology
Sound Life (1994)	Life Is Good (1995)	Quédate (1996)

Life Is Good is the first country music album by American Tejano music artist Emilio Navaira. It was released by Capitol Nashville on September 26, 1995. Its first single, "It's Not the End of the World," reached the Top 30 on the Billboard Hot Country Singles & Tracks chart. The album peaked at #13 on the Top Country Albums chart and #82 on the Billboard 200.

== Track listing ==
No.	Title	Writer(s)	Length
1.	"Even If I Tried"	Chris Faulk, Nettie Musick, Bob Regan	2:56
2.	"I Think We're On to Something"	Jeff Pennig, Regan	3:21
3.	"It's Not the End of the World"	Larry Boone, Earl Clark, Paul Nelson	3:29
4.	"Long as I Got You"	Skip Ewing, Don Sampson	2:30
5.	"Any Little Lie"	Ray Methvin, Will Rambeaux	3:51
6.	"Life Is Good"	Bruce Bouton, Rick Orozco	3:11
7.	"Honky Tonk Habit"	Mack Vickery	3:25
8.	"There'll Be No Crying"	Jess Brown	4:10
9.	"I Was There"	Bob DiPiero, Tom Shapiro	3:21
10.	"Have I Told You Lately"	Van Morrison	3:43
11.	"Hace Quanto He Dicho Que Te Amo (Have I Told You Lately)"	Morrison^{A}	3:40
12.	"No Es El Fin Del Mundo (It's Not the End of the World)"	Boone, Clark, Nelson^{A}	3:29

- ^{A}Spanish adaptation by Marco Flores.

== Personnel ==
- Eddie Bayers - drums
- Barry Beckett - keyboards
- Bruce Bouton - steel guitar
- Larry Byrom - acoustic guitar
- Paul Franklin - steel guitar
- Terry McMillan - percussion
- Phil Naish - keyboards
- Louis Nunley - backing vocals
- Bobby Ogdin - keyboards
- Don Potter - acoustic guitar
- Michael Rhodes - bass
- Brent Rowan - electric guitar
- John Wesley Ryles - backing vocals
- Joe Spivey - fiddle
- Dennis Wilson - backing vocals
- Pete Ybarra - accordion
- Curtis Young - backing vocals

== Chart performance ==
Chart (1995)	Peak position
U.S. Billboard Top Country Albums	13
U.S. Billboard 200	82
