= 1992 Tejano Music Awards =

12th Tejano Music Awards
- Location: San Antonio, Texas
- First award: 1992

The 12th Tejano Music Awards were held in 1992. They recognized accomplishments by musicians from the previous year. The Tejano Music Awards is an annual awards ceremony recognizing Tejano music musicians.

== Award winners ==
=== Vocalists of The Year ===
- Male Vocalist of The Year
  - Joe Lopez
- Female Vocalist of The Year
  - Selena

=== Vocal Duo Of the Year ===
- Joe Lopez, Jimmy Gonzalez and Mazz

=== Albums of the Year ===
- Orchestra (Para Nuestra Gente by Mazz)
- Conjunto (Shoot It by Emilio Navaira)
- Traditional (Si Todas Fueran Como Tu by Roberto Pulido)

=== Songs of The Year ===
- Song of The Year
  - Que Me Lleven Canciones by Mazz
- Single of The Year
  - Ven Devorame Otra Vez by Mazz
- Tejano Country Song of The Year
  - She's Not Alone by David Lee Garza y Los Musicales

=== Entertainers of the Year ===
- Male Entertainer of The Year
  - Joe Lopez
- Female Entertainer of The Year
  - Selena

=== Most Promising Band of The Year ===
- Joe Lopez

=== Song-writer of The Year ===
- David Lee Garza y Los Musicales

== See also ==
- Tejano Music Awards
