= Jhonny Pérez =

Jhonny Pérez may refer to:

- Jhonny Pérez (athlete) (born 1953), Bolivian runner
- Jhonny Pérez (swimmer) (1997), Dominican swimmer
- Johnny Perez, member of the Sir Douglas Quintet
