= 1995 Tejano Music Awards =

15th Annual Tejano Music Awards
- Date: February 11, 1995
- Location: San Antonio, Texas, U.S.

The 15th Annual Tejano Music Awards were held on February 11, 1995, at the Alamodome in San Antonio, Texas. The Tejano Music Awards is an annual awards ceremony recognizing the accomplishments of Tejano musicians from the previous year.

== Award winners ==
=== Vocalists of The Year ===
- Male Vocalist of The Year
  - Emilio
- Female Vocalist of The Year
  - Selena

=== Vocal Duo Of the Year ===
- Roberto Pulido and Emilio Navaira

=== Albums of the Year ===
- Orchestra: Amor Prohibido by Selena
- Progressive: Ya Me Canse by David Lee Garza y Los Musicales
- Traditional: Tres Ramitas by Hometown Boys

=== Songs of The Year ===
- Song of The Year
  - "Bidi Bidi Bom Bom" by Selena
- Single of The Year
  - "Amor Prohibido" by Selena
- Tejano Country Song of The Year
  - "She Can't Say I Didn't Cry" by Rick Trevino
- Instrumental of the Year
  - "El Tren" by Los Chamacos
- Tejano Music Video of the Year
  - "Lucero De Mi Alma" by Emilio Navaira
- Best Crossover Song
- ”Techno Cumbia” by Selena

=== Entertainers of the Year ===
- Male Entertainer of The Year
  - Emilio Navaira
- Female Entertainer of The Year
  - Selena

=== Most Promising Band of The Year ===
- La Diferenzia

=== Showband of The Year ===
- Culturas

== See also ==
- Tejano Music Awards
