= David Marez =

Tejano singer

- Born: August 18, 1949 (age 76); Mathis, Texas
- Genres: Tejano
- Years active: 1970–present
- Labels: Sony Discos; Manny Records; EMI Latin; Baby Dude Records

David Marez (born August 18, 1949), known as "La Voz de Oro", is an American singer. He began with gospel performances at his church. In the early 1970s, Marez rose to prominence as the lead vocalist for the Royal Jesters. In 1977, he parted ways with the group to establish his band, People. Under this moniker, he released one album before transitioning the ensemble into his official backing band. By 1983, Marez had signed with Bob Grever's Cara Records.

During the 1980s, he briefly fronted the Hot Tamales Band but departed before a scheduled wedding performance. This exit led to the discovery of Shelly Lares—the groom's sister-in-law—who credits Marez's departure as a pivotal moment in her entry into the Tejano music scene. By the mid-1980s, Marez established himself as a dominant performer in the Tejano music market. Music journalist Ramiro Burr, in his book The Billboard Guide to Tejano and Regional Mexican Music (1999), lauded Marez as one of Tejano's most soulful vocalists.

Marez's recording of "Entre Mas Lejos Me Vaya" earned the Song of the Year award at the 1987 Tejano Music Awards, while "Fijate" secured the same honor at the 1989 Tejano Music Awards. That same year, he received the Male Vocalist of the Year award and Album of the Year for Sold Out (1988). His streak continued at the 1990 Tejano Music Awards, when he was recognized as Male Vocalist of the Year.

By 1990, Marez had embarked on a solo career, signing with CBS Records by 1990. His album, El Musicano (1990), reached number nine on the US Billboard Regional Mexican Albums chart, marking his first top-ten entry. Later, he reunited with the Royal Jesters, releasing the reunion albums We Go Together (2004) and Odyssey: The Journey (2005). The latter, along with Corazón de Oro (2007), received Grammy nominations for Best Tejano Album. His album, Bringin' It Back (2004) was nominated for Album of the Year at the 2005 Tejano Music Awards.

In recognition of their contributions to Tejano music, Marez and Placido Salazar were honored with the Lifetime Achievement Award at the 2024 Tejano Music Awards.

== Discography ==
- David Marez (1980)
- David Marez, Vol. 2 (1981)
- Fue Nuestra Suerte (1983)
- The Voice is Back (1986)
- Revival (1987)
- Sold Out (1988)
- On the Move (1989)
- El Musicano (1990)
- Fresh Tracks (1991)
- Wildfire (1991)
- Enlightened (1992)
- Si Acaso Quieres (1993)
- Todo Por Amor (1994)
- Captivating (1994)
- Soy Tuyo (1995)
- Que Sentimientos (1995)
- Back to Basics (1997)
- Yo Soy Tejano (1999)
- Bringin' It Back (2004)
- Corazón de Oro (2007)
- Eclipse Total (2009)
- Voz De Oro (2012)
- Groovin' (2015)
- Chicano Rhythm Soul (2024)

== See also ==
- List of Hispanic and Latino Americans
- Music of Texas

== Works cited ==
- Carrizales, Sylvia M. (21 April 2021). "Shelly Lares discusses new album, LMD legacy, retirement and nursing career". Tejano Nation. Archived from the original on January 6, 2025.
- Medina, John Henry (17 October 2024). "David Marez to Receive Lifetime Achievement Award at 44th Annual Tejano Music Awards". Tejano Nation. Archived from the original on January 6, 2025.
- Birchmeier, Jason (n.d.). "David Marez Biography". AllMusic.com. Archived from the original on January 6, 2025.
- Burr, Ramiro (1999). The Billboard Guide to Tejano and Regional Mexican Music. Billboard Books. ISBN 9780823076918.
- Anon. (2015). San Antonio: our story of 150 years in the Alamo City. San Antonio, Texas: Trinity University Press. ISBN 9781595347565.
- Anon. (September 22, 1990). "Regional Mexican Albums > September 22, 1990". Billboard.com. Archived from the original on January 6, 2025.
