= Tejano Music Award for Female Vocalist of the Year =

Tejano music industry achievement award

- Current: 2025 Tejano Music Awards
- Awarded for: Female Vocalist of the Year
- Country: United States
- Presented by: Local television and radio stations
- First award: 1981
- Currently held by: Monica Saldivar (2025)

Highlights
- Most awards: Elida Reyna (13)
- Website: Tejano Music Awards

The Tejano Music Award for Female Vocalist of the Year is an honor presented to female Tejano music recording artists. The Tejano Music Awards, first bestowed in 1981, was established to recognize the most talented performers of the genre—a subcategory of regional Mexican music, with roots in the music of early European settlers in Texas. The awards are presented by the Texas Talent Musicians Association (TTMA), to "promote excellence in the Tejano music industry" using the popular vote method to select the winner of the female vocalist of the year. Historically, female musicians fared less favorably in the male-dominated genre and were seen as inferior to their male counterparts. The award was established by Rick Trevino, a male Tejano performer, who founded the Awards in 1981.

The award was first presented to American singer Lisa Lopez. Laura Canales won the award five nonconsecutive times and is considered Tejano music's first leading lady before the genre's golden age in the 1990s. Selena holds the record for most wins, winning 11 of her 12 nominations. The singer has been called the Queen of Tejano Music and is credited with catapulting the genre into the mainstream market. Following her death in March 1995, the genre suffered and its popularity waned. In 1998 Shelly Lares won for the first time since she was initially nominated in 1986. She holds the record for most nominations at 28. The following year Jennifer Peña won the award; the first time the award was won by two different participants since 1982. The current award holder is Elida Reyna who has the record for most consecutive wins - ten.

== Background and nomination process ==
Tejano music is a blend of polka, jazz, rhythm and blues, and country music, with influences of American pop music. Early European settlers introduced the accordion and bajo sexto, one of the major musical components used in the genre, to the state of Texas. Tejano music has since been urbanized with the introduction of keyboards and synthesizers. Historically, female musicians were seen as inferior and less successful commercially than their male counterparts, and were often turned down by music concert organizers who wanted sellouts. The female vocalist category was introduced at the first awards ceremony which was pioneered by Rick Trevino, a male Tejano musician, in 1981.

Nominees were originally selected by a voting poll conducted by program directors and disc jockeys at Spanish-language radio stations in Texas. Winners were previously chosen by Tejano radio station KIWW listeners in the 1980s, and later by fans of Tejano musicians in the Southwest of the United States. Currently, winners are selected through a survey of 50,000 Texas households with Hispanic surnames, though anyone with Internet access is eligible to vote on the official website page.

By 1987, the awards ceremony was broadcast by 32 radio stations and 25 local television channels in Texas, New Mexico, Arkansas, Oklahoma, and Louisiana. The awards ceremony was originally held at the Henry B. Gonzalez Convention Center, then at the San Antonio Convention Center until 1994, and the Alamodome until 1999. As of 2015, the ceremony is held annually at the Tobin Center for the Performing Arts in San Antonio, Texas.

== Recipients ==
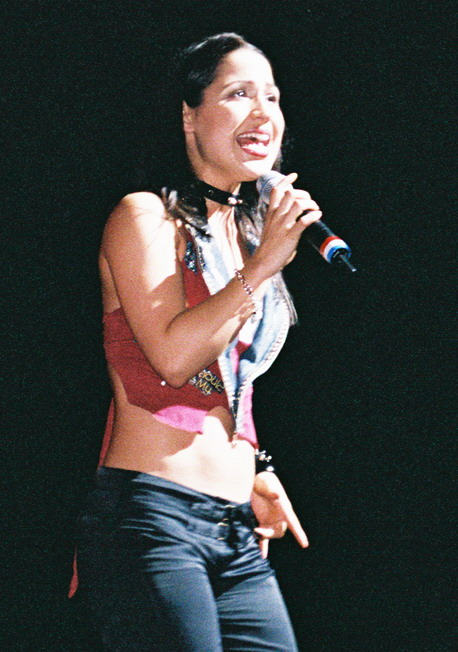
Tejano singer Jennifer Peña, winner in 1999, 2001, and 2003.

The award was first presented to American singer Lisa Lopez, who had a US Billboard Regional Mexican Airplay number one single with "Si Quieres Verme Llorar" (1982). Lopez' core audience was Mexicans, and she became the first female Tejano singer to appear on the Billboard Top Latin Albums chart in October 1986. Laura Canales, who popularized grupos in the 1970s, won the award five nonconsecutive times. She was considered Tejano music's first leading lady before the genre's golden age in the 1990s. At the sixth Tejano Music Awards (1986), Female Vocalist of the Year nominees included newcomers Shelly Lares and Selena who were up against veteran winner Canales. Selena won the award and won again at the seventh Tejano Music Awards in 1987; Canales won the honor in 1988. Beginning in 1989, Selena won the award for seven consecutive years.

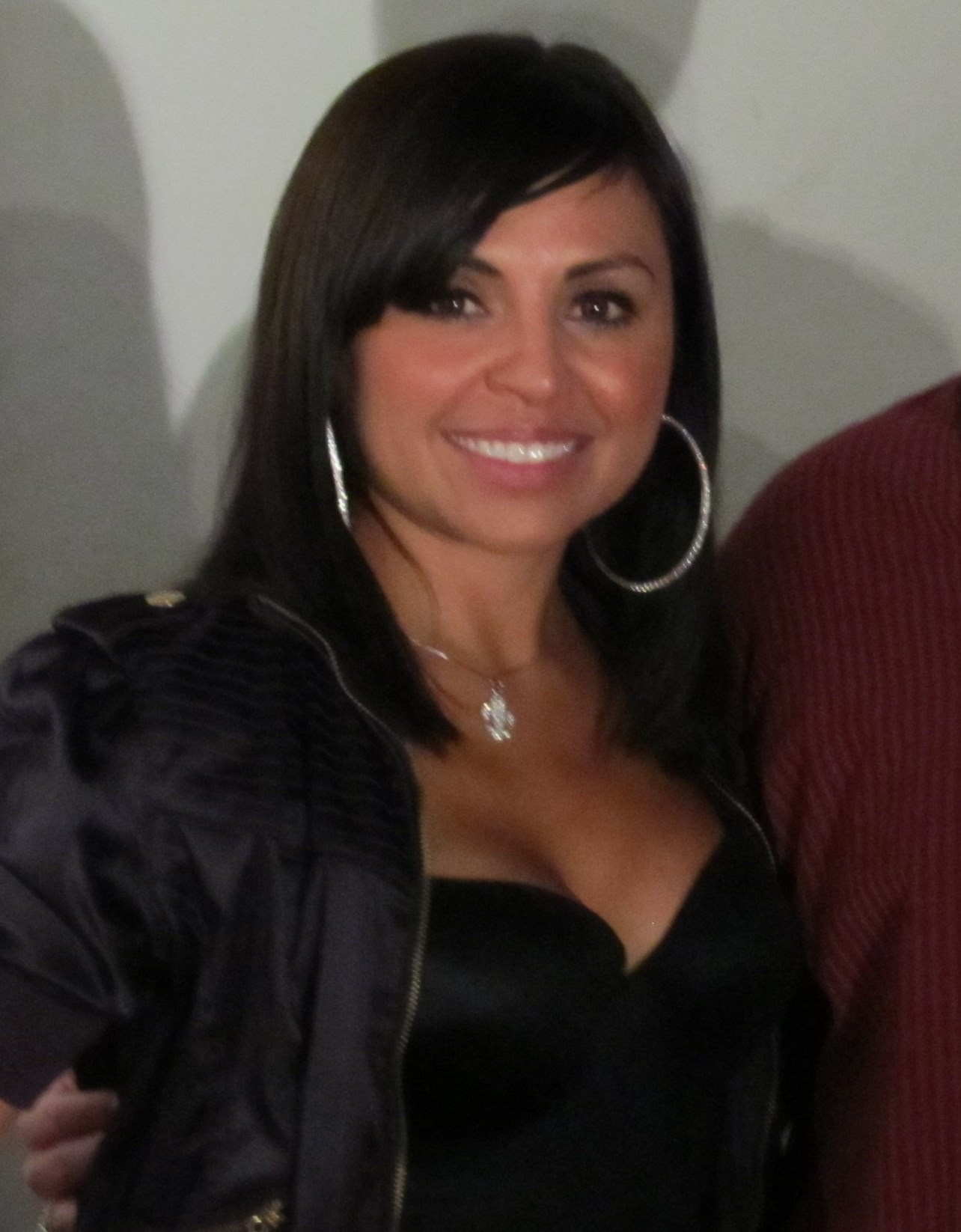
Elida Reyna currently holds the title of Female Vocalist of the Year as of 2015.

At the 10th Tejano Music Awards (1990), the nomination pool increased to include newcomers Cathy Chavez, Jean Le Grand, Agnes Torres, and veteran performers Selena, Lares, Elsa García, and Canales. From the 11th (1991) and 12th Tejano Music Awards (1992), the nominees remained the same with Selena, Lares, and Canales. The 13th Tejano Music Awards nominees included newcomer Esmeralda along with Selena and Lares. At the 14th Tejano Music Awards, Elsa Garcia was nominated for the first time in four years. Selena twice won the award posthumously after her shooting death in March 1995. She was called the Queen of Tejano Music and was credited with catapulting the genre into the mainstream U.S. market. Following the singer's death, Tejano music's popularity faded and has never recovered. At the 16th Tejano Music Awards (1998), Shelly Lares won the honor for the first time since she was nominated in 1986. Among the nominees for the 16th annual ceremony was newcomer Jennifer Peña, who was pegged as "the next Selena", and Elida Reyna who was first nominated in 1996. Peña was awarded the honor in 1999, 2001, and 2003 before retiring from the music industry.

In 2000, Elida Reyna took home the award. At the 22nd Tejano Music Awards, Lares won out over Reyna and Peña. For the 24th Tejano Music Awards nominees Kacy Zavala and Megan Leyva were up against veterans Reyna and Lares, with the former winning the title. The nomination pool increased for the 25th Tejano Music Awards with nominees including newcomers Delia Gonzáles, Julia Pizano, Linna Martínez, Machy De La Garza, Michelle, Stefani Montiel, and Yvette, while Kacy Zavala and Megan Leyva were up against veterans Reyna and Lares who won the award. Lares continued to win the award with her last win at the 26th Tejano Music Awards, when she was up against Montiel, Reyna, and newcomers Tracy Perez and Rebecca Valadez. Beginning in 2007, Reyna dominated the award through 2019. The title, as of 2025, is held by Monica Saldivar.

== See also ==
- List of music awards honoring women
- Music of Texas

== Notes ==
- San Miguel, Guadalupe (2002). Tejano Proud: Tex-Mex Music in the Twentieth Century. Texas A&M University Press. ISBN 1585441880. - Read online, registration required
- Burr, Ramiro (1999). The Billboard Guide to Tejano and Regional Mexican Music. Billboard books. ISBN 0823076911.
- Campbell, Michael (2012). Popular Music in America:The Beat Goes On. Cengage Learning. ISBN 978-0840029768.
