= Record club =

Mail-order music subscription service

- Industry: Recorded music
- Products: records; tapes; compact discs
- Owners: Concert Hall Society; Greystone Press; Book-of-the-Month Club; Crowell-Collier Publishing Co.; Columbia Records; RCA Victor Records; Capitol Records

A record club was a mail-order music subscription service. It was adopted and implemented by the major record labels in the 1950s for selling phonograph records and prerecorded reel-to-reel tapes. The labels later expanded their offerings to 8-track tapes, cassette tapes, and compact discs. The clubs dwindled to a close by 2010.

== Early clubs ==
Subscription record selling first appeared in the early 1930s during the Depression, but the practice was renewed with heightened interest in the post-World War II years of the mid- and late-1940s. Early record mail-order clubs were limited to esoteric repertoire or children's records. The Concert Hall Society was founded in 1946 by Samuel and David Josefowitz to produce classical music records, distributing them through a mail-order club.

In 1951 Greystone Press inaugurated the American Recording Society, a classical music record club based on the company's book club model.

In early 1952, the advent of the Musical Masterpiece Society by the Josefowitz brothers reflected a movement to promote record clubs as a mass sales tool. Two years later, the Greystone Press, which had premiered its Children's Record Club and Young People's Record Club, began testing Music Treasures of The World. Within that time frame, Book-of-the-Month Club launched Music Appreciation Records, and by 1956, additionally offered the Metropolitan Opera Club. Subsidiary clubs of the Concert Hall Society included the Opera, Handel, Chamber Music, Musical Masterpiece, and Jazztone Societies.

Crowell-Collier Publishing Company announced in February 1956 its intention to enter the record club arena, using its 10,500,000-subscriber base for solicitation. Six months later, the company acquired the Concert Hall Society and its five clubs. In January 1957, the company launched the Crowell-Collier Record Guild, focused on classical recordings.

== Early efforts of the major labels ==
Columbia Records launched an experimental record club in 1953, limited to solicitations in three Midwestern states. Due to the retail dealer furor it created, the club was shut down a year later, in November 1954. Dealers were upset by club benefits which included a free dividend record for every three purchased, and feared loss of direct sales as a result. Columbia revamped the membership plan and benefits, and allowed for dealer participation in the enrollment and purchase process, in a revised club that was announced in August 1955.

That same month, RCA Victor announced that it had no plans to start its own record club. Instead, in March 1956, RCA initiated its Save-on-Records coupon booklet plan, entitling the holder to discounts and bonus records through retail dealers. By November 1957, RCA had decided to join the record club ranks, and announced a partnership with Book-of-the-Month Club for classical discs to be offered through "The RCA Victor Society of Great Music – Presented by The Book of the Month Club." The club was set to begin operation in early 1958. In March 1958, RCA and Book-of-the-Month Club began operation of a Popular Album Club.

Capitol Records launched its record club with an initial test mailing in November 1957. The enthusiastic response prompted Capitol to announce a full-scale drive to establish its record club. A second, nationwide, mailing went out in January 1958.

== How it worked ==
Under Columbia's original club plan, upon enrolling in the club, the record buyer received a free LP from a group of the label's artists. Thereafter, eight selections were offered monthly, in four categories: classical; listening and dancing; Broadway, movies, television and musical comedies; and jazz. Columbia published a monthly club magazine describing current selections. Membership required the customer to purchase four LPs per year. For every two disks purchased, the customer would receive a bonus disk.

Over time, plans varied in the number of disks at sign-up, whether free or at a reduced price; the number of LPs required to be purchased in order to maintain membership; and the time period within which the minimum number of LPs were to be purchased. For example, in 1966, the Capitol sign-up allowed the customer to choose seven LPs for $1.87, with a commitment to purchase seven more LPs in one year. In 1976, the Columbia sign-up allowed the customer to choose 11 LPs for $1.00, with a commitment to purchase eight more LPs in a three-year period.

== Expansion ==
The clubs expanded their appeal by taking on other record labels' albums. In 1955, Book-of-the-Month Club's Music Appreciation Records struck deals with Angel, Westminster, and Vox Records to offer some of their catalog offerings.

In 1960, RCA Victor committed to handle two Warner Bros. Records releases. By 1965, RCA added releases from Decca and its subsidiary labels Coral and Brunswick.

Mercury Records went with Columbia, as did Argo, Kapp, Liberty, Verve, and United Artists.

ABC-Paramount Records signed with the Capitol Record Club in 1965, bringing along its subsidiary labels Impulse, Command, and Westminster (which it had acquired in the early 1960s).

After the Federal Trade Commission cleared Columbia's practice of licensing outside record labels, the clubs picked up additional labels. RCA added Deutsche Grammophon and London Records; MGM Records linked up with the Capitol Record Club, which included its Verve and Folkways affiliates.

In the U.K., mail-order subscription services were offered by the Britannia Music Club and the World Record Club.

== Mergers and acquisitions ==
Proliferation of record clubs inevitably led to mergers and acquisitions. Crowell-Collier announced the sale of its clubs in September 1957, a year after it got into the business. The company had planned to market the club to subscribers of its magazines, The American Magazine, Collier's, and Woman's Home Companion, which by December 1956, had discontinued publication.

In December 1968, Capitol announced the sale of its Direct Marketing subsidiary to Longines-Wittnauer Co., and the Capitol Record Club came under the wing of the Longines Symphonette Society (which operated a club of its own).

The RCA Victor Record Club evolved into RCA Direct Marketing, was acquired by Bertelsmann Music Group in 1986, and its name was changed to BMG Direct Marketing. In 2008, the enterprise was acquired by an investment firm, and became Direct Brands. It ceased music mail-order operations in 2010.

The Columbia Record Club began to be marketed as Columbia House in the early 1970s, an umbrella brand for its various mail order offerings. In 1987, Sony acquired Columbia House from its parent, CBS. In 1991, Sony partnered with Time-Warner in a joint venture that enabled Columbia House to market both companies' music and video offerings. In 2002 the enterprise was sold to an investment group, and three years later was acquired by BMG Direct Marketing (an outgrowth of RCA Direct Marketing, successor to the RCA Victor Record Club), and was renamed BMG Columbia House. In 2008, the enterprise was acquired by an investment firm, and its name changed to Direct Brands. It ceased music mail-order operations in 2010.

== Assessment ==
Over time, a significant number of members would not pay for records they ordered. Record companies saw lower royalties from sales through record clubs than from sales through stores and other means. In addition, that the clubs could give away up to one free record for every record sold resulted in about half as much revenue for record companies as they might get through other distribution channels. As a general assessment, record clubs were deemed not a complete commercial success.
