= 1990 Tejano Music Awards =

10th Tejano Music Awards
- Location: San Antonio, Texas
- First award: 1990

The 10th Tejano Music Awards were held in 1990. They recognized accomplishments by musicians from the previous year. The Tejano Music Awards is an annual awards ceremony recognizing Tejano music musicians.

== Award winners ==
=== Vocalists of The Year ===
- Male Vocalist of The Year
  - David Marez
- Female Vocalist of The Year
  - Selena

=== Vocal Duo Of the Year ===
- Joe Lopez, Jimmy Gonzalez and Mazz

=== Albums of the Year ===
- Orchestra (Breaking the Rules by Latin Breed)
- Conjunto (Emilio by Emilio Navaira)

=== Songs of The Year ===
- Song of The Year
  - Ahora Quiero Que Me Quieras by Mazz
- Single of The Year
  - Ay Mujer by Latin Breed

=== Entertainers of the Year ===
- Male Entertainer of The Year
  - Emilio Navaira
- Female Entertainer of The Year
  - Selena

=== Most Promising Band of The Year ===
- Emilio Navaira

=== Song-writer of The Year ===
- Joe Lopez

=== Tejano Gospel Music Artist ===
- Paulino Bernal

== See also ==
- Tejano Music Awards
