= Mexican cumbia =

National subgenre of dance music

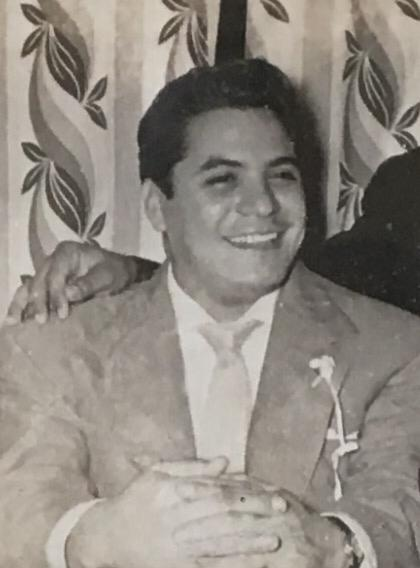
Tony Camargo, considered one of the icons of this type of music

Mexican cumbia is a subgenre of cumbia, a type of music which originated in Colombia but was later reinvented and adapted in Mexico.

== Origins ==
The cumbia has its origins in Colombia going back at least as far as the early 1800s, with elements from indigenous and black music traditions. In the 1940s, Colombian singer Luis Carlos Meyer emigrated to Mexico, where he worked with Mexican orchestra director Rafael de Paz. In the 1950s, he recorded what many believe to be the first cumbia recorded outside of Colombia, "El gallo Tuerto y La Cumbia Cienaguera". He recorded other hits like "La historia". Thus Cumbia gained popularity in Mexico.

In the 1970s Aniceto Molina also emigrated to Mexico, where he joined the group from Guerrero, La Luz Roja de San Marcos, and recorded many popular tropical cumbia songs like "El Gallo Mojado", "El Peluquero", and "La Mariscada". In the 1970s, Rigo Tovar enjoyed success with his fusion of cumbia music with ballads and rock.

== Definitions and variations ==
Mexican cumbia is similar to other adaptations of Colombian music such as Salvadorian cumbia, Peruvian cumbia or Argentinian cumbia, among others. It is not a unification of a single genre, but a mix of styles that are very diverse and wide ranging, from province to province and era to era. The styles, once assimilated by the public and the musicians of Colombian cumbia, gave birth to new subgenres, such as northern cumbia, southern cumbia, mariachi cumbia or Sonidera cumbia. These national variations are a fusion of adapted Colombian folk stories with the national styles like northern music, mariachi, band music, romantic music, huapango, Son Huasteco, and also with ancient and modern rhythms from abroad like Cuban Son, salsa, merengue, reggae, and ska among the Afro-Caribbean rhythms, as well as the Bolivian, Ecuadorian, Vals and Peruvian folk styles, in addition to later influences from rock & roll, hip-hop, rap, disco, dance, and electronica. These trends have varied according to the popularity of every one of the rhythms and era with what has merged. Mexican cumbia has diffused throughout Central America.

== Subgenres and variations ==
The Mexican cumbia has adapted versions of Colombian music like Peruvian cumbia or Argentine cumbia, among others. This diversity has appeared in different ways. For example, originally the northern cumbia (cumbia norteña) was usually played with accordion and consists of tunes with few chords and slower speed than original cumbia. This musical subset of cumbia includes artists such as Ramón Ayala, Acapulco Tropical, Bronco, Límite, and Los Barón de Apodaca. In southern cumbia, however, the accordion is replaced by piano or organ, and the pace is faster and more elaborated both harmonically and instrumentally than in the original cumbia. Notable artists of this style include Los Sonnors, Socios del Ritmo, and Chico Che.

Other subgenres of Mexican cumbia include Cumbia Mariachi, Cumbia Andina Mexicana, and Cumbia Sonidera. Orchestral Cumbia is another variant represented by big orchestras like Pablo Beltrán Ruiz, Orquesta Tampico, Orquesta Coatzacoalcos, Roy Luis among others, who popularized many cumbia songs accompanied by a full big band sound.

== 1940s-1960s ==
From the 1940s until the mid-1960s, Colombia experienced what was called the “Golden Age of Cumbia'' which characterized the country's musical identity for decades with hits such as the well-known cumbia song, La Pollera Colorá (“the red skirt”). Due to various social factors, cumbia receded in popularity as rhythms and music from abroad - mainly from the north - gained in popularity. Mexican music in all of its variants, Afro-Caribbean rhythms like salsa and merengue, and the rise in popularity of Vallenato folk music seemed to displace cumbia in Colombia. In Colombia, cumbia ceded ground to Vallenato as a centerpiece of Colombian national music, relegating cumbia only to national events and association with the historical past.

In its era of magnificence in the 1940s and 1950s, Colombian cumbia spread to several Latin American countries and was especially popular in Peru, Mexico, and Argentina.

The circumstances around the adoption of the Colombian cumbia rhythm has varied. For example, in Argentina the rhythm was adopted transparently because tango music utilized the accordion. The same happened with Mexico: the accordion plays a central role in northern music, so the fusion with the Colombian rhythm occurred naturally. Later, cumbia saw the adoption of the “accompaniment” of the bajo sexto from northern music, that in turn was taken from the accompaniment of Carmen Rivero’s conga drum, which would be replaced by the guitar and in orchestrated cumbia songs, would be replaced by keyboards, mainly by Venezuelan orchestras such as Nelson Henríquez and his Combo.

In the mid-1950s in Mexico, the group called “Los Cometas”, enjoyed success with various rhythms of bolero music, Cuban tropical music, among other Cuban rhythms and the foxtrot in their songs. This group recorded for the company CBS (today Sony Music) various classic hits.

Their particularity lies in using the accordion in all of their songs as the basis of its rhythm. Thus they remain in the memory of the Mexican people of the time. The hits that mix bolero and tropical music with an accordion like “Jugando poker,” “Chupando caña,” “¿En dónde está mi saxofón?”, “Que se mueran los feos,” among others. The assimilation of cumbia with its accordions made its adoption easier.

The first Colombian musician to venture to the north was Luis Carlos Meyer who decided after having a huge success in Colombia, to take a tour of different neighboring countries including Mexico. He was one of the first musicians who introduced of cumbia to the country, leaving a sample of the new “tropical” music in Mexico. This continued with the orchestras of Rafael de Paz and Tony Camargo, and in turn Lucho Bermúdez contributing other Colombian rhythms like the porro style. Other musicians a few years later would assimilate to the new Colombian rhythm. Meyer continued spreading his influence to the United States, where he would ultimately reside.

== The origins of Mexican cumbia dance and instrument composition ==
The emergence of the original Mexican ensemble for performing cumbia emerged in the early 1940s in the orchestras of Rafael de Paz and Tony Camargo. Rafael de Paz and Tony Camargo added the metallic sounds from Cuban music into cumbia music when Luis Carlos Meyer (native of Colombia) migrated to Mexico carrying the cumbia songs and dances and porros (folk dances) of his country. Cumbia originated in Colombia, and variations have been made in various countries based on the original Colombian style. There have been various writers who have analyzed the cross-country spread of Cumbia and both its effects on listeners. Both styles of ensembles were merged due to Meyers not having the traditional Colombian instrumentation. This is shown in the recordings of RCA Víctor Mexico by 1945 when they were already popular.

The traditional Bolero music in Mexico of Cuban and Puerto Rican trios included maracas, and the predominant Cuban music of the time as shown in films of the time, giving an account of the adoption of these instruments.

In Colombia, Lucho Bermúdez already was playing cumbia songs starting in 1940. He used an orchestra with a greater number of instruments that differed with the ones used in Mexico, being based mainly on saxophones and clarinets that are used to play the melody, along with an orchestral base. His music appeared in national films, but in the Mexican style. One reason why Lucho Bermúdez decided to leave Colombia was because there were not many quality recording studios, so he was invited to Argentina to record in studios of superior quality (such as RCA Víctor). It was not until 1963 that his works were truly dispersed at the inauguration of Inravisión. Carmen Rivero in 1962, integrated not only these instruments but also the timpani (drum), marking the stops, starts, and exits of the orchestra within the same musical theme. This was a style not seen in the Colombian recordings. This conductor is supported by the musical arrangements of the renowned and international Mexican author Fernando Z. Maldonado who accentuated the use of trumpets as well as the musical stops of the Cuban dances derived from the Danzón.
