= La Fiebre =

- Origin: Pasadena, Texas
- Genres: Tejano
- Years active: 1986–present
- Labels: L.F. Records; EMI Latin; Freddie Records

La Fiebre (English: The Fever) is a Tejano music band from Pasadena, Texas.

== History ==
The band formed in 1986. They have said that they chose their name after suffering from several fevers due to trying to develop a name for themselves. The original band members were Ricardo Garza Jr., Pete Espinoza, Rudy Rocha, Joe Angel Reynosa, Luis Ayala, Juan Manuel "Johnny" Tristan, and Eric Jiménez. In 1987, the group recorded their first album, Contagious, under their own label. This album gave them their first two charted songs, "Vestida de Color de Rosa" and "Por Tu Culpa".

Their 1991 album On The Rise produced the single "Borracho de Besos" and sold over 100,000 copies in the United States, staying on the Billboard magazine chart for several weeks. Their album No Cure also sold over 100,000 copies within a few weeks after its release. It contained several of their hits including "El Amor Se Acaba", "Eres Mi Primer Amor", "Aquel Carino" and "Labios de Cereza". In 1996, the group began to part ways. Eric Jiménez was the first to leave the group, to write and produce for other artists. In February 1997, La Fiebre left the EMI Latin label and signed with Freddie Records. Shortly after the release of their album Fenomenal, Luis Ayala left the group for personal reasons, but returned to the group to record the album Reunidos and reestablish the trumpet sound La Fiebre had been known for. In 1998, La Fiebre received a Grammy nomination in the category of Best Tejano Album for their album Fiebre Live En Concierto. The album was recorded at the Freddy Fest that took place in Corpus Christi, Texas and at a concert held in San Antonio, Texas.

In 2013, founding member Pete Espinoza departed the band because of health concerns and was succeeded by new lead vocalist Angel Cantu.

In 2017, La Fiebre released a new album, Fiesta, under Freddie Records. It was preceded by two singles, "La Fiesta" and "Soy Tejano".

In 2021, the band released a new album, Historico, which was nominated for Best Tejano Album of the Year.

In 2025, La Fiebre signed a new contract with Freddie Records. By the end of the year, it became known that Joe Reynosa and Rudy Rocha were involved in ongoing litigation with Luis Ayala. In early 2026, La Fiebre had split into two factions: The Ones You Know and The Pride of Pasadena. The first group included Angel Cantu, Luis Ayala, Julian González, Jonas Flores, Joe Lara, Gene Luna, Junior Cantu, and Henry Luna. The second consisted of Rudy Rocha, Joe Angel Reynosa, Rick Patino, Rey Talamantez, Raymond Anthony Garza, Daniel Sandoval, and Wero Falcon, with Abel Talamantez as the new lead singer.

== Band members ==
=== The Ones You Know ===
- Angel Cantu — vocals
- Luis Ayala — trumpet, saxophone, keyboards, backing vocals
- Julian Gonzalez — accordion, keyboards, backing vocals
- Jonas Flores — trumpet, saxophone, backing vocals
- Joe Lara — percussion
- Gene Luna — drums
- Junior Cantu — bass
- Dave Hernandez — guitar

=== The Pride of Pasadena ===
- Abel Talamantez — vocals
- Rudy Rocha — guitar, backing vocals
- Joe Angel Reynosa — bass
- Rick Patino — trumpet, saxophone
- Rey Talamantez — trumpet, saxophone
- Raymond Anthony Garza — keyboards
- Daniel Sandoval — drums
- Wero Falcon — accordion

== Discography ==
- Catch It! It's Contagious (1988)
- On The Rise (1989)
- Out of Control (1990)
- Contagious (1991)
- No Cure (1991)
- 911 (1993)
- Fiebre (1994)
- La Fiebre Presents Luis Ayala (1995)
- Hasta El Final (1996)
- Fenomenal (1997)
- Live En Concierto (1998)
- La Navidad (1998)
- Evolución (2000)
- Reunidos (2004)
- Anthology (2006)
- Nueva Era (2014)
- Fiesta (2017)
- Histórico (2021)
