= Mazz =

American Tejano band

- Mazz c. 1990

Background information
- Origin: Brownsville, Texas, United States
- Genres: Tejano; ranchera; cumbia; ballad; conjunto; disco, funk (in early years)
- Years active: 1977–1998
- Labels: Santos Records; Cara; Capitol/EMI Latin; EMI Latin
- Spinoffs: The Force; Jimmy González y Grupo Mazz; Joe López y la Nueva Imagen Mazz
- Past members: Joe López; Jimmy González; Juan Murillo; Noé García; Carlos J. Canul; Héctor Augusto Flores; Adolfo García; Danny López; Tommie González; Brando Mireles; Richard Barrón; Robert Chávez; Frankie Caballero; Mario González; Alfonso González; Homero Esquivel; Joel Guzmán; Rebecca Valadez; César Mojica
- Logo from 1983–1986
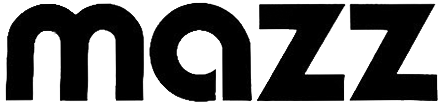

Mazz (/ˈmɑːz/ MAHz) was an American Tejano band formed in Brownsville, Texas in 1977. It was founded by its foremost members, singer Joe López and guitarist and arranger Jimmy González. The band became known for its unique and innovative style of rancheras and cumbia. After signing with and moving to the then-upcoming record label Capitol/EMI Latin in 1989, they would become one of the Tejano genre's most popular bands during its 1990s golden age.

Mazz disbanded in 1998, with frontmen López and González going on to form, respectively, Joe López y la Nueva Imagen Mazz in 1998 and Jimmy González y Grupo Mazz in 1999.

In 2006, López was convicted of and imprisoned for sexually assaulting his niece. After his release in 2018, he formed another group, Joe López y Grupo Mazz and continues to write, record, and perform.

== Before Mazz ==
Joe López and Jimmy González were born 30 minutes apart on August 28, 1950 in Brownsville, Texas and became friends at the age of 7. In June 1977 González persuaded Noe Garcia keyboardist to make a group with him and Joe. They waited a year for Noe because he was a senior in college and was about to graduate in May of 1978 which would be the official launch of the band. After Noe agreed to join we worked on getting Adolfo Garcia into the group. Juan Murillo was the person that convinced Adolfo because they were friends. Nobody knew Adolfo. Adolfo agreed to replace Daniel López on the drums when the Brownsville band Something Easy would disband at the end of the year (1977). In November 1977, the band would assume a new name. According to González: "The name Mazz came from the fact that a lot of people spell 'Gonzalez' with an 's' instead of a 'z.' Plus, we were both really into the rock group KISS at the time and we liked the way a short name looked. So we took the Spanish word for 'more,' which is 'mas,' and spelled it our way."

== Mazz (1978–1998) ==
Mazz is often credited with introducing or at least advancing the synthesizer into the Tejano music sound, though they were one of many bands to do so in the 1980s. Credit should be given when it is due and Mazz and Noe G. were using synths before 1977. In the mid-1980s, Mazz entered a marketing contract with Coors that provided the band with exposure. The marketing success of Coors enabled the band to tour in Florida, California, and much of the southwest and Pacific coast states of the United States. The band's repertoire included many songs by award-winning songwriter Luis Silva. Several of those became the band's earliest successes, such as "Laura Ya No Vive Aquí" (1980), "Borraré Tu Nombre" (1982), and "Otra Vez" (1984). The band's first live show was held in 1983 at Rosedale Park in San Antonio, Texas. González was surprised that the "[p]eople were all singing [their] songs." Mazz began receiving many honors at the Tejano Music Awards, including Single of the Year, Best Tejano Album, Male Vocalist of the Year, and Showband of the Year. By 1986, Mazz began selling 50,000 units and became one of the top-selling Tejano acts. The group, known to party and arrive late to performances, was dubbed the "Bad Boys of Brownsville". González commented that "The bad boy image was really cool [...] We were bad in our music. But it got turned into bad, like mean. For example, when bands fight over who goes on stage first. It was known that we were no pushovers." However, he said that he was okay with the label. The single "Laura Ya No Vive Aqui" peaked atop Billboard's Latin music charts in March 1987. The band's 1987 album Beyond took Album of the Year honors at the 1988 Tejano Music Awards, while Lopez and Gonzalez won Vocal Duo of the Year.

In 1988, Mazz signed with CBS Records and released Straight from the Heart (1989), and the following year they signed with EMI Latin. At the 1990 Tejano Music Awards, Grupo Mazz took Songwriter of the Year (Lopez), Vocal Duo of the Year, and Song of the Year (for "Now I Want You to Love Me") honors. The band's album No Te Olvidare (1990) reached atop the Billboard Regional Mexican Albums chart in July 1990. It spent five consecutive months at number two behind Bronco. In March 1990, the album received a gold award from EMI Latin, signifying 50,000 units sold. That July, the company announced that No Te Olvidare sold 75,000 units in the United States. Mazz performed at RodeoHouston for 14 consecutive years, starting in 1991 as part of Go Tejano Day.

In 1990, EMI Latin purchased Cara Records and thereby inherited Mazz.

In April 1994, Mazz's bus driver was found with 49 pounds of marijuana at the Falfurrias checkpoint. The band, however, was in Chicago at the time. Rumors of marijuana use among the band members thus began to circulate, but these were eventually cleared. This vindication was desired especially by González, who was in fact strongly opposed to drug use.

Mazz released Al Frente de Todos in 1997 and again received mixed reviews. EMI Latin has not released the album to streaming services. The Corpus Christi Caller-Times headlined its release, "New Mazz album is good enough, but not great," and commented in sum, "In all, the 12 cuts in this album show Mazz in a favorable light, but there's no cutting edge here. The group seems to be in a complacent groove. That spark of independence, of musical ingenuity that showed itself in past arrangements is missing." The album did nevertheless contain "Pa' Que Sepas," a ranchera that received "heavy radio play" and was released as a single. It also held a live cumbia reprisal of "Micaela", a song recorded as mariachi just the previous year for Mazz Mariachi y Tradición. The Caller-Times commented that it made "the earlier recording sound bland."

At the September 1997 Tejano Thunder concert at Rosedale Park in San Antonio, Mazz would apparently enter in five stretch limousines escorted by three police motorcycles, but ironically, López, González, and most of the band were already backstage.

March 1998 marked the release of Margarita, the debut album of Tejano musician Freddy Fender's niece Margarita Huerta, produced by Jimmy González and Gilbert Velásquez. Huerta had begun her career a year prior opening and singing backing vocals for Mazz. Mazz also released their final album Cuántas Veces later that year, which received slightly better reaction compared to their previous two albums. Ramiro Burr commented that it was "not quite up to Mazz standards," but that it had "a few bright spots," including the title track and "Ojos Querendones" (both of which were selected for reprisal when López and González reunited in 2006).

Mazz's albums No Te Olvidaré, Para Nuestra Gente, Una Noche Juntos, and Mazz Románticos Que Nunca, sold 100,000 units each by June 2018.

=== Separation ===
López and González separated in summer 1998 and pursued solo careers with their own bands.

== "Mazz" trademark ==
The ownership of the "Mazz" trademark was disputed between López and González. López claimed that he had always owned the trademark and allowed González to keep using it. López's incarceration presumably made him more permitting with the trademark; legal action for its ownership he would be unable to take while in prison. After his release from prison and González's death, López did pursue the trademark from González's widow.

On September 29, 2023, the "Forever Jimmy G." Facebook page publicly admonished the Texas Talent Musicians Association to retract a email sent to its followers about Joe López's nomination for the Lifetime Achievement Award at the 5th Annual Tejano Music Awards that falsely claimed him as the recipient of the 2001–2004, 2009, and 2014 Grammy awards to Jimmy González y Grupo Mazz. Contradictorily, the last two awards were won while López was incarcerated.

As of September 1, 2025 the Joe Lopez y Grupo Mazz Instagram profile biography continues to misleadingly claim them to be "Winners of the Latin Grammy Award for Best Tejano Album 2001-2004, 2009."

== Members ==
Principal members

- Joe López – lead vocals (1977–1998)
- Jimmy González – guitar, backing vocals, arrangements (1977–1998; died 2018)

Early members

- Juan Murillo – bass, backing vocals (1977–1984; died 2011)
- Noé García – keyboards (1977–1979)
- Carlos J. Canul – percussion (1978)
- Héctor Augusto Flores – keyboards (1979–1984)
- Adolfo García – drums (1979–1982, 1985–1998)
- Danny López – drums (1979)

Later members

- Tommie González – congas, saxophone, percussion (1983–1998)
- Brando Mireles – keyboards (1984–1998)
- Richard Barrón – percussion (1984–1997 or 1998)
- Robert Chávez – bass (1984–1990)
- Frankie Caballero – accordion (1988, 1989, 1995)
- Mario González – bass (1990–1997 or 1998; died 2012)
- Alfonso González – accordion (1990–1992)
- Homero Esquivel – accordion (1993–1997 or 1998)
- Joel Guzmán – keyboards (July–October 1994)
- Rebecca Valadez – backing vocals (1995–1997 or 1998)
- César Mojica – keyboards (1997–1997 or 1998)

== Discography ==
- Mazz (Santos Records, 1978)
- Más Mazz (Santos Records, 1978)
- "El" (Cara, 1979)
- 1980 (Cara, 1980)
- Class (Cara, 1980)
- The Look of Mazz (Cara, 1981)
- Command Performance (Cara, 1982)
- Pesado (Cara, 1982)
- The Force (Cara, 1983)
- It's Bad! (Cara, 1984)
- Standing Ovation (It's A Killer) (Cara, 1984)
- The Bad Boys (Cara, 1985)
- Number 16 (Cara, 1985)
- La Continuación: Number 16 Part II (CBS/Discos CBS International/Cara, 1986)
- Dance Your Mazz Off (CBS/Discos CBS International, 1987)
- Beyond (CBS/Discos CBS International, 1987)
- Straight From the Heart (CBS/Discos CBS International, 1988)
- No Te Olvidaré (Capitol/EMI Latin, 1989)
- Para Nuestra Gente (Capitol/EMI Latin, 1990)
- Una Noche Juntos: Live (Capitol/EMI Latin, 1991)
- Lo Haré por Ti (Capitol/EMI Latin, 1992)
- Mazz Románticos Que Nunca (EMI Latin, 1993)
- Qué Esperabas (EMI Latin, 1993)
- Regalo de Navidad (EMI Latin, 1994)
- Sólo para Ti (EMI Latin, 1995)
- Mazz Mariachi y Tradición (EMI Latin, 1996)
- Al Frente de Todos (EMI Latin, 1997)
- Cuántas Veces (EMI Latin, 1998)

== Awards ==
For awards to López and González as individuals, see Joe López § Awards, Jimmy González § Awards

Tejano Music Awards
Year	Composition	Category
1981		Most Promising Band of the Year
1986	Number 16	Album of the Year (Orchestra)
1988	Beyond	Album of the Year (Orchestra)
1990	"Ahora Quiero Que Me Quieras"	Song of the Year
1991	No Te Olvidaré	Album of the Year
1991	"Amor con Amor"	Single of the Year
1991	"No Te Olvidaré"	Song of the Year
1993	"Lo Voy Hacer Por Ti"	Single of the Year
1993	"Lo Voy Hacer Por Ti"	Song of the Year
1996	Sólo para Ti	Album of the Year (Orchestra)
1999	Cuántas Veces	Album of the Year (Group)

Grammy Awards
Year	Composition	Category	Result
1991	"Amor con Amor"	Best Mexican-American Performance	Nominated
1992	Para Nuestra Gente	Best Mexican-American Album	Nominated

Lo Nuestro Awards
Year	Composition	Category	Result
1991		Regional Mexican Group of the Year	Nominated
1991	No Te Olvidaré	Regional Mexican Album of the Year	Nominated
1992		Regional Mexican Group of the Year	Nominated
1992	Para Nuestra Gente	Regional Mexican Album of the Year	Nominated
1993		Regional Mexican Group of the Year	Nominated
1994		Regional Mexican Group of the Year	Nominated
1994	Lo Haré Por Ti	Regional Mexican Album of the Year	Nominated
