= Jimmy González =

American Tejano musician

- González with his 2001 and 2002 Latin Grammy Awards for Best Tejano Album

Background information
- Born: James González; August 28, 1950; Brownsville, Texas, US
- Died: June 6, 2018 (aged 67) Methodist Hospital, San Antonio, Texas, US
- Genres: Tejano
- Instruments: Vocals; guitar
- Formerly of: Jimmy González y Grupo Mazz; Mazz
- Spouses: Anna Lisa (m. 1999) Yolanda Solís (m. 1968–1985)

James González, better known as Jimmy González (August 28, 1950 – June 6, 2018), was an American Tejano vocalist, guitarist, and songwriter known for co-founding the group Mazz in 1977 with his friend Joe López; and later after that group's 1998 separation, for his succeeding group Jimmy González y Grupo Mazz, which while operating won six Latin Grammy Awards for Best Tejano Album.

== Jimmy González y Grupo Mazz ==
González signed a recording contract with Freddie Records in 1999. His group won the Latin Grammy Award for Best Tejano Album in 2001, 2002, 2003, 2004, 2009, and 2014, and holds the record of most wins.

== Health and death ==
González was acutely overweight for most of his life. He was once reported to weigh 450 pounds, which "in various interviews" he attributed to a glandular disorder; thus he was diabetic, and would sit during most performances, especially as he aged.

González was scheduled to play November 2, 2008 at Reliant Arena in Houston before being awarded a Latin Grammy for his album Incomparable, but did not attend because of weakness and low blood pressure, for which on November 4 he was admitted to a Harlingen hospital and later transferred to a Corpus Christi hospital for tests. González was released November 10 and determined by doctors to have experienced "uncontrolled sugar and blood pressure problems."

In February 2018, González was hospitalized after difficulties breathing during a show. Following a show on June 5, González planned on returning to Brownsville. He decided to visit relatives in San Antonio and was hospitalized on June 5 following a drop in blood sugar. González experienced cardiac arrest and was momentarily revived, but died on Wednesday, June 6, 2018, of complications from diabetes. Within hours of the announcement of his death, Tejano musicians including Shelly Lares, David Lee Garza, and Raulito Navaira shared tributes on social media, and Tejano music stations in San Antonio began a constant play of Mazz music.

His group was scheduled to perform at the Shrimporee in Aransas Pass on June 9, and during the Puro Tejano Texas Showdown on June 23 and June 24, 2018, as part of the Puro Tejano 101.7 launch party. The June 24 event was dedicated a tribute to González.

== Discography ==
See Mazz § Discography and Jimmy González y Grupo Mazz § Discography

== Awards ==
See also Mazz § Awards and Jimmy González y Grupo Mazz § Awards

Tejano Music Awards
Year	Category
1986	Vocal Duo of the Year (with Joe López)
1988	Vocal Duo of the Year (with Joe López)
1989	Vocal Duo of the Year (with Joe López)
1990	Vocal Duo of the Year (with Joe López)
1991	Vocal Duo of the Year (with Joe López)
1992	Vocal Duo of the Year (with Joe López)
1995	Vocal Duo of the Year (with Joe López)
2002	Male Vocalist of the Year
2002	Male Entertainer of the Year
2006	Vocal Duo of the Year (with K. C. Zavala)
2007	Vocal Duo of the Year (for "Old School Memories" with Freddie Martinez)
2014	Male Vocalist of the Year
2014	Vocal Duo of the Year (for "Canciones de Amor" with Elida Reyna)
2018	Lifetime Achievement Award
