= Emilio Navaira =

American singer-songwriter

Background information
- Born: Emilio H. Navaira III; August 23, 1962; San Antonio, Texas, U.S.
- Died: May 16, 2016 (aged 53) New Braunfels, Texas, U.S.
- Genres: Tejano; country; Norteño
- Occupation: Singer-songwriter
- Instruments: Vocals; guitar
- Years active: 1983–2016
- Labels: Cara; Discos CBS International; Capitol/EMI Latin; Capitol Nashville; RCA/BMG Latin; RCA/Ariola
- Website: www.emilioyrio.net

Emilio H. Navaira III (August 23, 1962 – May 16, 2016) was an American singer-songwriter of Tejano and country music. He is the winner of one Grammy Award and one Latin Grammy Award.

Known to most by the mononym Emilio, he charted more than ten singles on the Billboard Hot Latin Tracks charts, in addition to six singles on the Billboard Hot Country Singles & Tracks charts. Emilio was also one of the few Tejano artists to have significant success in both the United States and Mexico, and was called the "Garth Brooks of Tejano". His biggest country hit was the No. 27 "It's Not the End of the World" in late 1995, and his highest-charting single on any chart is "Por Siempre Unidos," which peaked at No. 7 on Latin Pop Airplay in 1996. Along with Selena, Emilio was one of the most prominent artists that helped popularize Tejano music.

== Early life ==
Emilio H. Navaira III was born on August 23, 1962, in San Antonio, Texas, to Mexican-American parents, Emilio Navaira, Jr. and Maria Hernandez. Growing up on the south side of San Antonio, Navaira found each influence in not only Tejano legends such as Little Joe y la Familia, but also Lone Star country music heroes such as Willie Nelson, Bob Wills, and George Strait. As a student, Navaira graduated from McCollum High School in 1980, received a music scholarship to Texas State University, and majored in music with plans to become a teacher before ultimately deciding to pursue a career as an artist.

== Musical career ==
In 1983 at age 21, Emilio began his performing career by singing lead vocals for David Lee Garza y Los Musicales. In 1987, Cuantas Veces by David Lee Garza Y Los Musicales beat out Alpha by Tejano music group Selena y Los Dinos. for Album of the Year at the Tejano Music Awards. In 1989, Navaira formed his own band, Emilio y Grupo Rio. That same year Emilio signed with Columbia Records (then known as CBS Records). This relationship resulted in Emilio recording more than fifteen studio albums to date, including several with his Rio Band.

By the mid 1990s, Emilio began crediting himself solely as Emilio, eventually switching his focus to country music. Between 1989 and 1996, Emilio had released seven Spanish albums with cumulative sales of about 2 million. This success lead to mainstream commercial exposure, with companies such as Coca-Cola and Wrangler Jeans using his songs in their advertisements in the 1990s. Emilio had also gained a sponsorship with Miller Lite beer, who had persuaded him to use their slogan at the time, "Life is good," as the title of his first country album.

Emilio signed with Capitol Records and released his first country music single called "It's Not the End of the World" which reached the Top 30 on the country charts in 1995. His album was a surprise success as well reaching No. 13 on the country charts and also a high placing on the Top 200. Several more singles including a Spanish version of "It's Not the End of the World" followed but none of these singles came close to the Top 40 except "Even If I Tried" which reached No. 41 in 1996. In 1997, he released a second country album, "It's on the House" but it was not as successful as his first country album. Two more minor country singles followed and gradually Emilio faded from country music and increasingly came back to Tejano music.

His 2002 album Acuérdate won the Grammy Award for Best Tejano Album and his 2007 album De Nuevo won the Latin Grammy Award for Best Tejano Album.

== Personal life ==
Navaira has five children. His three children from his first marriage to Cynthia Navaira also perform for Grupo Rio. Emilio Navaira IV plays drums, and Diego Navaira plays guitar and daughter Emely. Emilio IV and Diego also had a band named Ready Revolution; in 2014 they formed The Last Bandoleros, a Tex-Mex-foursome that toured with Sting in 2017. Diego is mainly known for vocals and credited with being on The Voice, which he did not win. He also has two children from his second marriage to Maru Navaira,

Navaira has two siblings: Raul "Raulito" Navaira, who performs back-up vocals for Grupo Rio; and Yvette Navaira. Navaira was a Republican.

=== Driving accidents ===
Navaira was hospitalized in critical condition after his tour bus crashed early in the morning on March 23, 2008, in Bellaire (a small municipality partially surrounded by Houston, Texas). Navaira had performed the previous night at Hallabaloos, a Houston nightclub and he was at the wheel of the tour bus as it traveled north along west 610 Loop near the Southwest Freeway when it crashed into a set of freeway barrels shortly before 4 am. Emilio was taken by Life Flight to Memorial Hermann Hospital where a blood clot in his head was removed; Emilio's initial treatment included being kept in a medically induced coma and induced hypothermia to minimize brain swelling. Doctors cautioned that he might not survive. Emilio later pleaded guilty to driving while intoxicated.

On September 24, 2008, Emilio was involved in another car accident in San Antonio as a passenger while his wife was driving. According to a witness, the Navairas were stopped in a turn lane when a truck crossed at least two lanes of traffic and struck their vehicle. Both Emilio and his wife Maria were released from the hospital the following day. Emilio's agent, Joe Casias, stated that Emilio and his wife were headed home from a rehabilitation therapy appointment stemming from the March tour bus accident.

=== Death ===
Emilio was found dead by his wife in his New Braunfels home on May 16, 2016, at 53 Emilio performed his last known concert in Monterrey, Nuevo León, Mexico, on May 11, 2016, as part of a concert celebrating Mother's Day in that city. Reports indicated he suffered a massive heart attack. Authorities said their investigation into the death of Navaira showed that he died of natural causes because of cardiovascular disease, and found no sign of foul play.

== Discography ==
=== Studio albums ===
Year	Title	Chart Positions			
Year	Title	US Latin	Regional Mexican	US Country	US
1989	Emilio Navaira y Rio Band		8		
1990	Sensaciones				
1991	Shoot It		14		
1992	Unsung Highways	32	11		
1992	Shuffle Time				
1993	Southern Exposure^{A}	4	2		
1994	Sound Life	5	2		
1995	Life Is Good			13	82
1996	Quédate	9	2		
1997	It's on the House			50	
1997	A Mi Gente	46	15		
2000	El Rey del Rodeo				
2001	Lo Dice Tu Mirada				
2002	Acuérdate				
2003	Entre Amigos				
2007	De Nuevo				

- ^{A}Southern Exposure also peaked at No. 39 on US Heatseekers.

=== Singles ===
Year	Title	Chart Positions				Album
Year	Title	US Hot Latin	Latin Regional Mexican	US Country	CAN Country	Album
1995	"¿Dónde andará?"	25	—	—	—	Soundlife
1995	"Ya"	18	13	—	—	Soundlife
1995	"It's Not the End of the World"	—	—	27	—	Life Is Good
1995	"No es el fin del mundo"^{B}	18	12	—	—	Life Is Good
1996	"Even If I Tried"	—	—	41	—	Life Is Good
1996	"I Think We're On to Something"	—	—	56	80	Life Is Good
1996	"Have I Told You Lately"	—	—	62	80	Life Is Good
1996	"Por siempre unidos" (w/ Ednita Nazario and Graciela Beltrán)^{C}	17	—	—	—	single only
1996	"Quédate"	32	17	—	—	Quédate
1997	"Hoy me siento feliz"	39	—	—	—	Quédate
1997	"I'd Love You to Love Me"	—	—	56	77	It's on the House
1997	"She Gives"	—	—	73	—	It's on the House
2000	"Esperando su llamada"	—	40	—	—	El Rey del Rodeo
2002	"Lo dice tu mirada"^{A}	—	35	—	—	Lo Dice Tu Mirada

- ^{A}Credited to Emilio Navaira.
- ^{B}"No Es El Fin del Mundo" is a Spanish-language version of "It's Not the End of the World".
- ^{C}"Por Siempre Unidos" also peaked at No. 7 on Latin Pop Airplay.

=== Guest singles ===
Year	Title	Artist	Chart Positions	Album
Year	Title	Artist	US Hot Latin	Album
1993	Tú Robaste Mi Corazón	Selena	5	Selena Live!
1995	"Ya ahora es tarde"	Roberto Pulido	17	Te vi partir

=== Music videos ===
Year	Video	Director
1992	"Como Le Hare"	
1993	"Ya No Me Pones Atención"	
1995	"Lucero De Mi Alma"	
1995	"Ya"	
1995	"It's Not the End of the World"	Steven Goldmann
1995	"Di Que Si"	
1996	"Even If I Tried"	Michael Merriman
1996	"I Think We're On to Something"	
1996	"Have I Told You Lately"	
1996	"Quedate"	
1997	"I'd Love You to Love Me"	
1997	"She Gives"	
2007	"De"	
2012	"La Persona de mi vida"	
