= Tejano Music Awards =

American music award

- Current: 2024 Tejano Music Awards
- Promotional poster for the Tejano Music Awards
- Awarded for: Recognizing outstanding performers of Tejano music
- Venue: Alamodome, Lila Cockrell Theatre (San Antonio Convention Center)
- Country: United States
- Presented by: Texas Talent Music Association (TTMA)
- First award: 1981
- Website: tejanomusicawards.com

The Tejano Music Awards (TMA) is an accolade created by former arts teacher and musician Rudy Trevino in 1980. The accolade recognizes outstanding performers of Tejano music, a German polka-based Latin music genre recorded in Spanish or English-language. The annual presentation ceremony features performances by Tejano artists and bands and the presentation of all awards. The Tejano Music Awards are annually presented in San Antonio, Texas, although the ceremony has been presented in other cities such as Eagle Pass, Texas in the past.

The first Tejano Music Awards was held in 1981 and recognized Tejano musicians and recordings of 1980. The ceremony awarded Tejano musicians in 11 categories: Male Vocalist of the Year, Female Vocalist of the Year, Vocal Duo of the Year, Album of the Year – Orchestra, Album of the Year – Conjunto, Single of the Year, Male Entertainer of the Year, Female Entertainer of the Year, Song of the Year, Songwriter of the Year, and Most Promising Band of the Year. Tejano music enjoyed wider success in the 1990s as it entered its first renaissance and marketable era. This was due to the popularity of American singer Selena, who was called the "Queen of Tejano Music". Selena dominated the female-only awards, while American singer Emilio Navaira was called the "King of Tejano music". The Tejano Music Awards celebrated their "quinceañera" year in 1995 and awarded Tejano musicians in 14 categories.

By the 20th annual Tejano Music Awards, the genre suffered and its popularity waned after Selena was shot and killed in 1995. The Lifetime Achievement Award was erected in 1999 and was awarded to Tejano artists who had a major impact on the genre. At the 2005 Tejano Music Awards, the ceremony celebrated their "silver anniversary" and awarded Tejano artists in 14 categories, the most categories since 1995. The 30th annual Tejano Music Awards was celebrated in 2010 with a decade-ballot category, awarding artists in specific categories that they reign in the 1980s, 1990s, and the 2000s. The 2024 Tejano Music Awards is the 44th annual upcoming event. Aside from the awards ceremony, the annual Fan Fair is celebrated weeks in advance from the Tejano Music Awards.

== 2008 winners ==
- Song of the Year: "Elida's Medley" by Elida Reyna
- Male Vocalist of the Year: Jay Perez
- Female Vocalist of the Year: Elida Reyna
- Entertainer of the Year: Jay Perez
- Album of the Year (Tejano): 35th Anniversary by Ruben Ramos and the Mexican Revolution
- Album of the Year (Conjunto): Chuco's by Los Garcia Brothers
- Crossover Song of the Year: "His House" by Jimmy González y Grupo Mazz
- Vocal Duo of the Year: Shelly Lares and Sunny Sauceda
- Most Promising Band: Tex-Mex Kadillaks
- Showband of the Year: Jay Perez
- Lifetime Achievement Awards: Joey Lopez (producer), Arturo Villarreal (promoter), Freddie Martinez (record label)

== 2012 winners ==
- Song of the Year: "Juntos Hasta Morir" by Elida Reyna and Jesse Turner
- Male Vocalist of the Year: Jesse Turner of Grupo Siggno
- Female Vocalist of the Year: Elida Reyna
- Entertainer of the Year: Elida Reyna
- Album of the Year (Tejano): Lo Que Me Dejaste by Grupo Siggno
- Album of the Year (Conjunto): Manteniendo La Promesa by The Hometown Boys
- Vocal Duo of the Year: Elida Reyna and Jesse Turner for "Juntos Hasta Morir"
- Best New Male of the Year: Ricky Valenz
- Best New Female of the Year: Jessica Sanchez
- Best New Group of the Year: Tejano Highway 281
- Lifetime Achievement Awards: Elsa Garcia, Mingo Saldivar, Johnny Canales
