= Pete Astudillo =

American singer (born 1963)

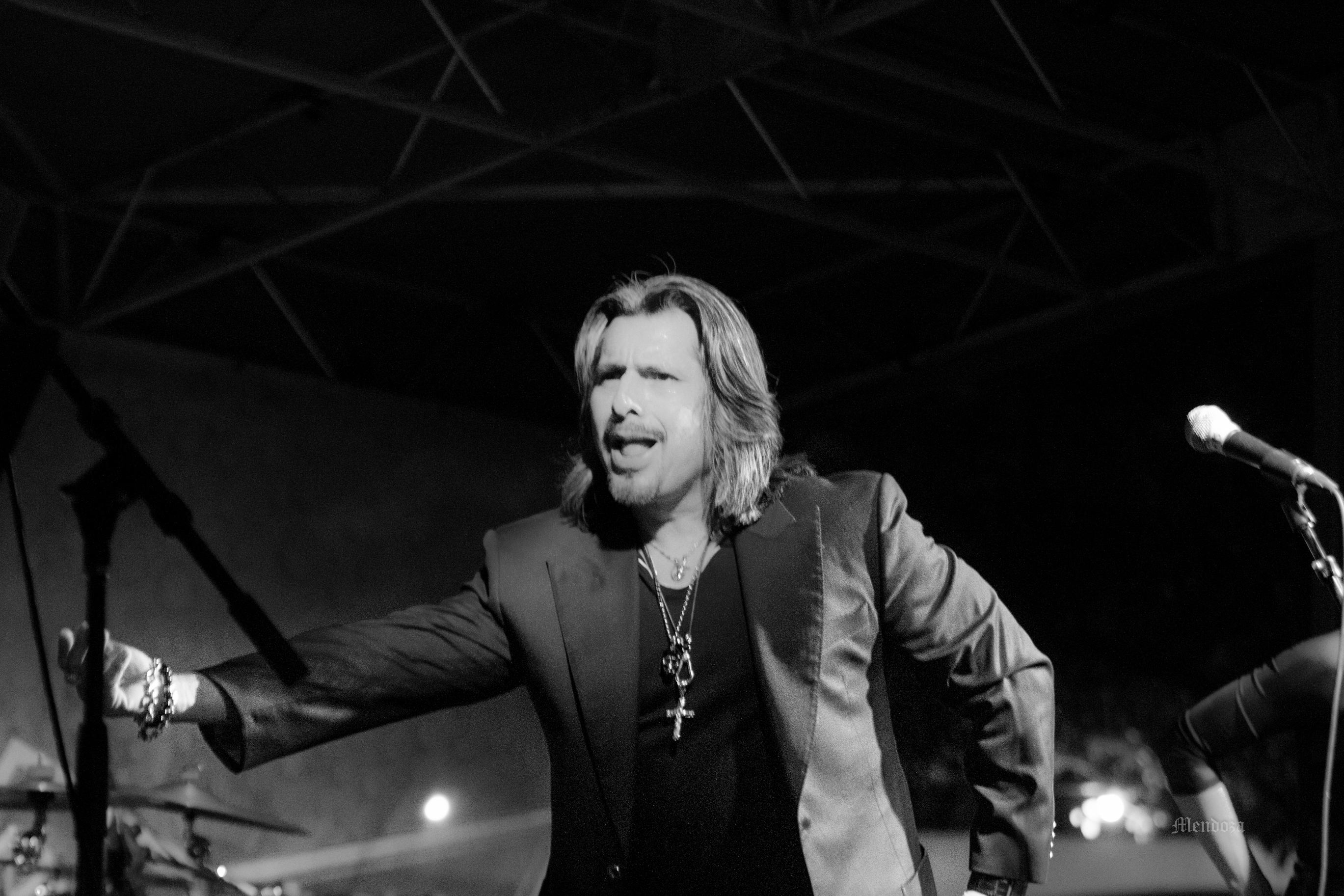
- Pete Astudillo during a concert in Laredo, Texas in 2016.
- Born: Pedro Astudillo; December 1, 1963 (age 62); Laredo, Texas, US
- Other names: Peter Astudillo
- Education: Laredo Nixon High School (1982); Laredo College
- Occupations: Singer; songwriter; dancer; producer
- Parents: Pedro Astudillo (father); Paz Astudillo (mother)
- Musical career
- Genres: Tejano; Tejano cumbia; Latin pop; Conjunto
- Years active: 1985–present
- Labels: EMI Latin; Q-Productions; Peace Rock Records
- Formerly of: Los Bad Boyz; Selena y Los Dinos; Oxygeno; Ruido Anejo
- Website: peteastudillo.com

Pedro Astudillo (born on December 1, 1963), is an American singer-songwriter, record producer, and dancer. Referred to as "the Latino Babyface" by The Daily Journal, he is credited as a key figure behind Selena's signature music style. Astudillo wrote or collaborated on some of the most popular Tejano music songs of the 1990s and was inducted into the Tejano Roots Hall of Fame in 2019. His impact on the United States Latin music scene lies in his role as a songwriter collaborator, according to Billboard magazine.

After high school, he pursued music education, forming Los Bad Boyz with Joe Ojeda. Discovered by a local DJ, they joined Selena y Los Dinos, integrating in December 1988. Astudillo's addition involved harmonizing with Selena and performing various roles within the band. Astudillo's contribution to songwriting for the group began with "Besitos" (1989), co-written with the group's producer-songwriter A. B. Quintanilla, leading Selena y Los Dinos to explore the cumbia genre. His compositions for Ven Conmigo (1990) contributed to its commercial success, ranking among the longest-running albums on the US Billboard Regional Mexican Albums chart. Supported by Los Dinos and signed to Q-Productions, Astudillo released his debut solo album, Entregate a Mi, in January 1992.

Astudillo remained dedicated to Selena y Los Dinos, contributing to songwriting while on tour. He and A. B. co-wrote "Como la Flor" (1992), which became one of the most popular songs recorded by an artist of Mexican descent in the US. At the 1994 BMI Latin Music Awards, Astudillo received Songwriter of the Year honors. He co-wrote "Amor Prohibido" and "Bidi Bidi Bom Bom" for Selena's Amor Prohibido (1994), both becoming chart-toppers on Billboard's Hot Latin Songs chart, while the latter became the most successful US Latin single of 1994. On March 31, 1995, Selena was shot and killed and Astudillo resumed performing during the opening of Sea World Texas, while still recovering from his mother's death the year prior.

Astudillo released Como Te Extrano (1995), with the title track serving as a tribute to Selena and Astudillo's mother, Paz. The titular track peaked at number one on the Regional Mexican Songs chart, remaining for ten consecutive weeks. Astudillo received Most Promising Band honors at the 1996 Tejano Music Awards and began to be hailed as the "next big thing" in the Tejano market. At the 1996 BMI Latin Music Awards, Astudillo tied with Juan Luis Guerra for Songwriter of the Year. Si Tu No Estas (1997) failed to replicate the commercial success achieved by its predecessor, as well as ¿Dónde Estás Amor? (1999). Astudillo left Q-Productions in 2001 to forge his label, Peace Rock Records, and released his albums independently. After a stint as a rocker with Ruido Añejo in the early 2010s, Astudillo returned to Tejano music with his band, Pete Astudillo y Tekno-Mex. His collaboration with A. B., on "Pelón" for Boyz of Kumbia, peaked at number 38 on Billboard's Regional Mexican Songs chart in April 2021.

== Life and career ==
=== 1981–1988: Early life and career beginnings ===
Pedro Astudillo was born on December 1, 1963, at the Las Palmas ranch in Laredo, Texas. His parents, Pedro and Paz Astudillo, were Mexican immigrants from Guerrero, and arrived in the United States in 1962. Until he was 13 years old, Astudillo worked alongside his family on farms thinning beets and potatoes. He described working in the fields as demanding but rewarding. Astudillo worked as a dishwasher and later a cook at his family's restaurant. Singing in his church choir gave Astudillo an outlet, although he initially felt shy about it. Astudillo found himself drawn to music class. At the age of nine or ten, Astudillo began writing love poems and songs to express himself. Astudillo acknowledged that it was never a planned endeavor to become a singer, but rather a surprise discovery. He initially began singing on a whim, without any preconceived notions of pursuing it as a career. As he continued writing, Astudillo found himself enamored with singing and composing lyrics. Astudillo remained hopeful of a music career despite his lack of funds.

Astudillo graduated from Laredo Nixon High School in 1982. In 1984, after spending a few years at Laredo College, he quit college to open a restaurant with his brother in Loveland, Colorado. He later reapplied to college after moving back to Laredo. Astudillo met Joe Ojeda through a mutual friend, who was seeking a lead singer. They formed Los Bad Boyz, making their debut at the catering business of Astudillo's brother, Rogelio. Rogelio often recommended Los Bad Boyz to patrons who were unable to afford live music. Los Bad Boyz faced challenges securing larger gigs and rejection from promoters, even after offering to perform for free. Astudillo attributed this to their relative obscurity and the skepticism surrounding a two-person band.

Feeling overwhelmed by its challenges, Astudillo and Ojeda considered quitting music. During one of their performances at a flea market, they were discovered by local DJ, The Bird El Locutor #2. Astudillo described it as a stroke of luck, feeling they were in the right place at the right time. In August 1988, The Bird extended Los Bad Boyz a regular slot at Rox-Z's in Laredo, though they performed unpaid. Despite their performances, Los Bad Boyz went unnoticed as they were relatively unknown. The club's owners and workers appreciated their music, prompting The Bird to propose to management that whenever a popular band or performance was scheduled, Los Bad Boyz could open for them. The following month, Los Bad Boyz opened for Selena y Los Dinos. The group consisted of lead singer Selena, A. B. Quintanilla as the band's producer-songwriter, and bassist, Suzette Quintanilla on drums, keyboardist-songwriter Ricky Vela, and Jesse Ybarra on guitar. Selena y Los Dinos was managed by the Quintanilla's father Abraham Quintanilla. By 1988, Selena y Los Dinos was ranked the most requested band in ten out of fifteen Tejano music radio stations in Texas. Astudillo remarked that he knew who Selena was, but noted that he was not too into Tejano music at the time.

Abraham was initially skeptical of Los Bad Boyz opening for Selena y Los Dinos because they were a two-person group. However, Los Bad Boyz's performance made a positive impression on Selena y Los Dinos and Abraham. After the show, Abraham approached Los Bad Boyz and inquired about their management and booking, offering his business card, and requested them to call him to discuss potential future collaborations. Abraham asked Los Bad Boyz if they would go on the road with them as their opening act, which they did for the next two months. They opened for Selena y Los Dinos in various cities, as a strong friendship between Astudillo and A. B. began to develop. Astudillo stated how he and Ojeda "were happy just to be on the same stage with [Selena y Los Dinos]", and thought that the group was "just being polite" when they were asked to continue to support the group as opening acts. Astudillo likened Selena y Los Dinos to the "Latino Brady Bunch" and described Selena as "goofy, crazy and loud".

A. B. gradually persuaded Abraham, though initially reluctant due to financial concerns, to incorporate Los Bad Boyz into the group. Ultimately, A. B. convinced Abraham, allowing Astudillo and Ojeda to integrate into Selena y Los Dinos. Astudillo and Ojeda joined the group on December 25, 1988, following a show in Midland, Texas. Astudillo experienced a profound sense of fulfillment when he was invited to join Selena y Los Dinos, feeling as though his aspirations had finally materialized. Astudillo's addition to Selena y Los Dinos involved harmonizing with Selena and performing duets with the singer, as well as being a hype man, dancer, and roadie. Astudillo often performed duets with Selena on tour, while Ojeda joined as the second keyboardist. Astudillo brought complex lyrics and melodies with lots of chords to his songwriting assistance for the group.

=== 1989–1991: Selena y Los Dinos ===
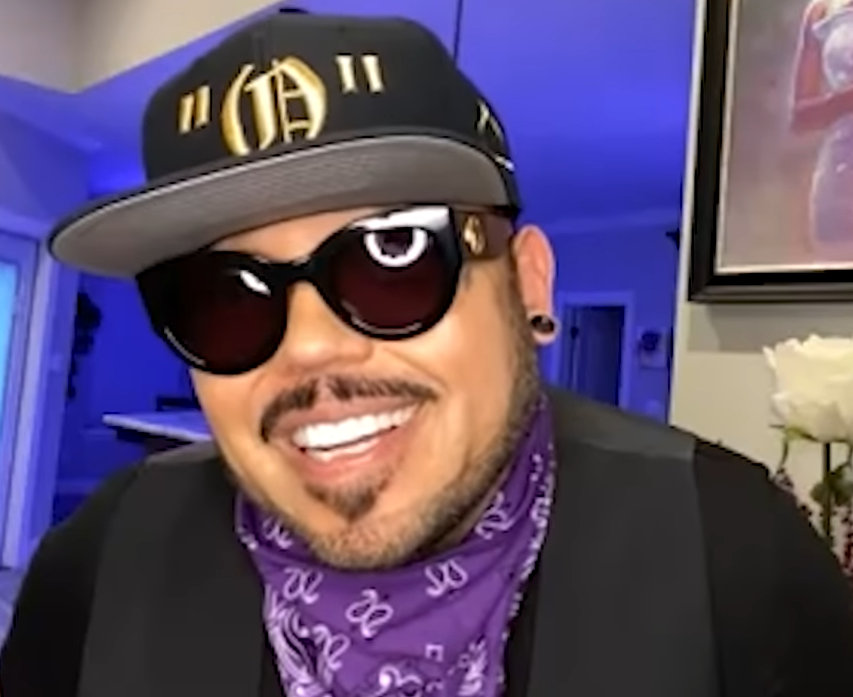
Astudillo began composing music with A. B. Quintanilla (pictured in 2020) when he was integrated into Selena y Los Dinos.

During the 1989 Tejano Music Awards, Rick Trevino invited Selena y Los Dinos to be the opening act for the awards ceremony after La Sombra declined the offer. Representatives from CBS Records and newly formed EMI Latin attended the awards event to scout for new acts. EMI Latin's president, Jose Behar, wanted to sign Selena y Los Dinos to his label, while CBS was offering twice EMI's offer. Abraham found EMI Latin's proposal appealing due to the potential for a crossover deal, and he intended for his children to be the first musicians to sign with the company.

The production of the group's debut album began in June 1989. The goal of Selena was to be an introduction to the international Latin music market, with future sights into an English-language crossover. The band became "a bit more trendier and a little bit cutting-edge" on Selena with experimental production and songwriting. It was the first album with any production and songwriting assistance from Astudillo and Ojeda. Astudillo discovered his ability to write songs when he started collaborating with A. B. It wasn't until their initial songwriting session that Astudillo thought he could "do that." Vela and Astudillo began elaborating the arrangements in their music production. The track "Besitos", Astudillo's first contribution to songwriting for the group, marked a significant turning point for the band. The track inspired the group to experiment with cumbia music in subsequent releases. Astudillo's collaboration with A. B. guided the band towards a more danceable style infused with cumbia influences. This fusion, according to Pamela Colloff of Texas Monthly, drew elements of funk and hip-hop, creating a distinctive and vibrant sound.

During the recording sessions for the duet "Amame, Quiereme", Astudillo felt overwhelmed by the professionalism of Los Dinos in the studio, as the group had high expectations for him to match their level. It was Astudillo's first recording session in a studio, and Suzette remarked that Astudillo was noticeably nervous during the sessions. Astudillo was removed from the studio after an unsuccessful session; he expressed his disappointment at not meeting the desired range. After a friend of his successfully hit the required range and with encouragement, Astudillo retried and met the required demands for the track. Astudillo said his aspirations of recording in a professional studio inspired him not to give up. Writing for the El Paso Times, Maria Cortes Gonzalez called Astudillo's vocals on the track as being "sexy", and "seductive". "Amame, Quiereme" was nominated for Vocal Duo of the Year at the 1990 Tejano Music Awards.

Astudillo and Abraham wrote "Sukiyaki"–originally a 1960s Japanese song by Kyu Sakamoto–into a Spanish-language song. Vela, who intended to be involved in the writing process, acknowledged Astudillo's songwriting skills and Spanish fluency, ultimately preferring Astudillo's approach for "Sukiyaki". Astudillo assisted with the arrangements for "My Love" on Selena, to which Selena's biographer, Joe Nick Patoksi, interpreted the track as an homage to Madonna. Astudillo recorded the duet with Selena on "Yo Te Amo" for Ven Conmigo (1990), which was nominated for Vocal Duo of the Year at the 1992 Tejano Music Awards. The band opted for a bridge-interlude structure for "Yo Te Amo", instead of their usual recycled chord progression, reflecting their growth and evolution. Patoski found that the song's form wasn't distinctly Texan or Mexican but represented international Spanish music that was masked within a slow cumbia framework. Other tracks Astudillo wrote for Ven Conmigo includes, "Baila Esta Cumbia", "Enamorada de Ti", and "No Quiero Saber". "Baila Esta Cumbia" was certified 6× platinum (Latin) by the Recording Industry Association of America (RIAA), denoting 360,000 units consisting of sales and on-demand streaming in the United States. The compositions Astudillo wrote or co-wrote were largely responsible for Ven Conmigo's continued commercial success on the US Billboard Regional Mexican Albums chart, which by March 1992, ranked as the second-most weeks an album has remained on the chart behind Ana Gabriel by two weeks. The album was selected by the Library of Congress for preservation in the United States National Recording Registry for being "culturally, historically, or aesthetically significant" in 2021.

=== 1992: Solo career with Oxygeno and Entre a Mi Mundo ===
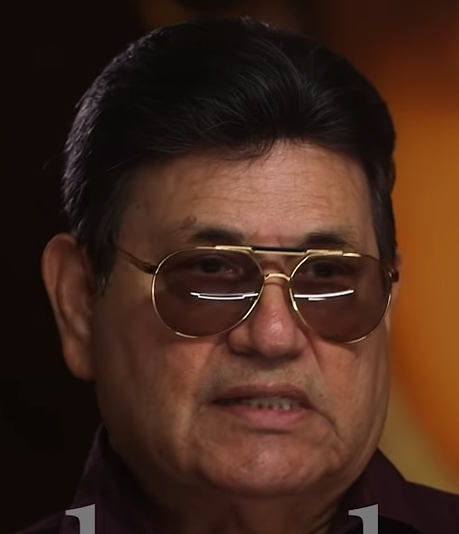
Abraham Quintanilla (pictured in 2020) signed Astudillo to his Q-Productions label and began managing him during his solo career.

Los Dinos supported Astudillo's desire to go solo. With A. B.'s support, they began work on his debut album during their spare time amidst Selena y Los Dinos' busy schedule. EMI Latin and Abraham believed Astudillo had potential as a solo artist. Los Dinos contributed instrumentally to his album, with A. B. co-writing six tracks and producing the record. Music critic for the Corpus Christi Caller-Times, Rene Cabrera, proclaimed Astudillo as possessing the requisite attributes to succeed as a soloist, noting his vocal abilities harmonized with a polished and commanding stage demeanor.

Astudillo and his band Oxygeno began as opening acts to Selena y Los Dinos. Abraham became Astudillo's manager and signed him to his Q-Productions label with distribution through EMI Latin. Astudillo released his debut album, Entregate a Mi, in January 1992. By March, Entregate a Mi was performing well in local markets. The singles, "Un Hombre Busca Una Mujer", a cover of Luis Miguel, "Porque Le Gusta Bailar Cumbia", "Nada Nada", and the title track, were receiving heavy airplay in various cities. "Porque Le Gusta Bailar Cumbia" was often the most requested song by fans.

Astudillo remained dedicated to Selena y Los Dinos, emphasizing his loyalty to the band. He continued to contribute to songwriting while touring. When asked if he would depart Los Dinos to continue his solo career, Astudillo responded that he would not leave the band, saying, "I'm a Dino, part of the family. This group is solid and I like it here." The band's album, Entre a Mi Mundo aimed to propel them into the Mexican and Latin American markets. One of the tracks, "Como la Flor", penned by Astudillo and A. B., emerged from genuine emotions, despite initial disagreements over its theme. "Como la Flor" became one of the most popular songs recorded by an artist of Mexican descent in the US. Ilan Stavans credits the rise of Latin pop in the US during the 1990s to the widespread appeal of "Como la Flor". Widely considered to be Selena's signature song and her "trademark", "Como la Flor" has become a posthumous epithet and swan song, as well as her most popular recording. It is one of her "most celebrated" songs and has become part of the Texas musical canon. The RIAA certified "Como la Flor" 9× platinum (Latin).

Other songs Astudillo wrote or co-wrote for Entre a Mi Mundo, include the Juan Gabriel-inspired "¿Qué Creías?", "Vuelve a Mí", and the comical "La Carcacha", drew inspirations from everyday life. "¿Qué Creías?" was certified gold (Latin), while "La Carcacha" was certified 3× platinum (Latin) by the RIAA. According to guitarist Chris Pérez, Astudillo was supportive of his and Selena's relationship, despite her family and the other member's cautions about how Abraham would take it. Astudillo mentioned that although the band wasn't entirely certain, they had sensed that something was developing between Selena and Pérez. Pérez began dating Selena in secret. In reaction to her emotions for Pérez and their concealed relationship, Selena composed "Ámame" (1992) and sought lyrical assistance from Astudillo.

=== 1993–94: Separation from Selena y Los Dinos, Como Nadie, and Amor Prohibido ===
Astudillo received the nomination for Single of the Year for "Un Hombre Busca Una Mujer" as well as Male Vocalist of the Year at the 1993 Tejano Music Awards. Astudillo and Selena were nominated for Vocal Duo of the Year for "Siempre Estoy Pensando en Ti". Cabrera found Astudillo's rendition of "Un Hombre Busca Una Mujer" at the awards ceremony commendable. He noted that Astudillo demonstrated his readiness to embrace challenges, finding the track demanding.

Astudillo made his debut appearance on television with his band on the Johnny Canales Show on November 19, 1993. The following week, his single "Ganar O Perder" debuted at number nine on the indie Tejano Singles music chart in Texas. Music critic for the El Paso Times, Ramiro Burr named "Ganar O Perder" as one of the "hot cuts on Tejano radio". The single peaked at number three on the music chart on the week ending December 23, 1993. Astudillo began working on this third studio album in January 1994. He was nominated for Male Vocalist of the Year and Vocal Duo of the Year with Selena at the 1994 Tejano Music Awards.

In February 1994, Abraham advocated for Astudillo to leave Selena y Los Dinos to focus on his solo career. Despite claims mentioned in the Del Rio News-Herald about relying on Selena's fame, Astudillo felt proud of his journey with her, asserting his ability to stand on his own merit as a solo artist. Maldonado remarked that witnessing Astudillo's departure from Selena y Los Dinos was difficult, as their onstage chemistry and mutual support had become integral to their performances. Astudillo separated from Oxygeno and embarked on a new name for his band. Former Los Dinos member Jesse Jesus Ybarra joined Astudillo as his guitarist, while Danny Hernandez and Mike Hererra joined as keyboardist, Sernando Orosco joined as his bassist, and Ricky Landeros joined the group as its drummer.

At the 1994 BMI Latin Music Awards, Astudillo won Songwriter of the Year. At the Tejano Music Awards, Astudillo and A.B. continued to be snubbed from Songwriter of the Year honors, which was criticized by Cabrera, who credited them as key contributors to Selena's works. Astudillo co-wrote "Amor Prohibido" and "Bidi Bidi Bom Bom" for Selena's Amor Prohibido (1994), which became the two most popular tracks off the album. Astudillo remarked that co-writing "Bidi Bidi Bom Bom", was one of the best memories he shared with Selena. "Amor Prohibido" peaked at number one on the Billboard Hot Latin Songs chart the week ending June 11, 1994, and remained atop the chart for nine consecutive weeks, becoming the most successful US Latin single of 1994. "Amor Prohibido" was certified 7× platinum (Latin) by the RIAA. "Bidi Bidi Bom Bom" peaked at number one on October 29, 1994, and was certified 9× platinum (Latin) by the RIAA. Other tracks Astudillo wrote or co-wrote for Amor Prohibido include "Techno Cumbia", which was certified platinum (Latin), and "Si Una Vez" which was certified 3× platinum (Latin).

To promote his album Como Nadie (1993), Astudillo embarked on a tour in West Texas through eastern New Mexico. The single, "Piquito de Oro", made its debut at number six on the indie Tejano Singles music chart in Texas on the week ending April 7, 1994. The following tracking week, it peaked at number two. Astudillo's mother, Paz Astudillo, died on April 11, 1994. "Piquito de Oro", as well as the album's other singles; "Vas a Llorar", "Ganar O Perder", and "Acaso No Soy", were receiving considerable airplay in Texas. Maldonado wrote how the track, "Vas a Llorar", utilizes the backdrop of raindrops as a symbol of someone crying. The track debuted at number nine on the indie Tejano Singles music chart on the week ending June 2, 1994, it peaked at number two behind "Amor Prohibido" on the week ending July 3. "Vas a Llorar" reached the top 15 of the US Radio y Musica magazine's top Latin songs in Florida. Cortes Gonzalez felt that "Vas a Llorar" is a testament to Astudillo's talent as a songwriter and performer.

Astudillo's music videos began airing regularly on Univision. In August 1994, Astudillo began searching for an accordion player to join his band. Astudillo made his second appearance on the Johnny Canales Show on July 3, 1994. He also appeared on the music TV program Padrisimo on December 17, 1994. While Astudillo's initial albums, Entregate a Mi (1992) and Como Nadie (1993), did not secure positions on national music charts, The Odessa American expressed confidence in Astudillo's trajectory, foreseeing his ascent to prominence as one of the top Tejano artists in the industry. The newspaper praised Astudillo for his vocal abilities and songwriting skill, attributing these talents as providing him with a distinct advantage and positioning him as a competitive contender in the Tejano market. The singles off Como Nadie continued to receive extensive airplay through 1995.

=== 1995: Death of Selena and Como Te Extrano ===
By 1995, Tejano became the fastest-growing Latin genre, with annual revenues topping $100 million. Astudillo collaborated with A. B. on the comical cumbia track "Asi Te Quiero" (1995) for Imagen Latina. On March 31, 1995, Selena was shot and killed. Astudillo spoke to KBNA-FM following the news, talking about Selena as he wept on air, as he was still recovering from his mother's death the year prior. He attended her funeral on April 3. Astudillo resumed performing during the all-star Cinco de Mayo celebration and Selena tribute during the opening of Sea World Texas. He performed several Selena songs during his tour. Astudillo expressed that he managed her death similarly to others who deal with a loss. Astudillo expressed gratitude for the lessons gleaned from Selena, which facilitated his coping mechanisms.

In June 1995, "Amor Prohibido" became the first Spanish-language song to receive the BMI Pop Music Award. In July, Astudillo opened for Willie Nelson and received a commemorative plaque, along with Selena's family, which was hung at the Texas State Aquarium's Conservation Cove. Astudillo collaborated with Vela on "Estupido Romantico", which was recorded by Mazz. The track peaked within the top ten of the Hot Latin Songs chart in September 1995. Astudillo released his third studio album, Como Te Extrano, on December 1, 1995. Como Te Extrano marked Astudillo's first album in two years, an unusual lapse by Tejano artists of the time. The album climbed the music charts of Radio y Musica.

The compositions on Como Te Extrano contain a mixture of pop cumbias and rancheras, typical of Tejano albums, with production by A. B. Mario Taradell of The Dallas Morning News, ranked it as one of the best Latin albums of 1995, praising Astudillo as the top composer in the market. Como Te Extrano sold 50,000 units within its first month, 100,000 units in seven weeks, and reached 200,000 units by January 1997. The sales achievement of Como Te Extrano solidified Astudillo's presence in the industry. The title track, written by Astudillo, Ojeda, and A. B., was recorded as a tribute to Selena and Astudillo's mother, Paz. The song emanated from Astudillo's emotions and heartfelt sentiments. Astudillo emphasized that the songwriting process was deeply personal, allowing him to express his feelings without pretense. It made its debut at number 15 on the Billboard Hot Latin Songs chart and number nine on the Regional Mexican Songs chart, in the week ending October 21, 1995. It peaked at number one on the Regional Mexican Songs chart, on the week ending November 18, 1995, where it remained atop the chart for ten consecutive weeks. "Como Te Extrano" peaked at number two on the Hot Latin Songs chart, on the week ending January 13, 1996.

Astudillo aimed to capture universal sentiments of longing and ache in "Como Te Extrano", purposefully omitting Selena and his mother's names to allow listeners to personalize the song. It became Astudillo's signature song. Driven by the emotive titular track, Como Te Extrano debuted at number eight on the Billboard Top Latin Albums chart and at number two on the Regional Mexican Albums chart, behind Selena's Amor Prohibido, on the week ending November 25, 1995. The album maintained its position in the top ten of the Latin music charts for nearly four months. Como Te Extrano peaked at number six on the Top Latin Albums chart, on the week ending December 16, 1995. Paul Verna from Billboard magazine, hailed the album for its innovative blend of pop, cumbia, and ranchera styles that pushed the boundaries of Tejano music. Tracks like the rancheras "Si Me Vas a Dejar", "Cayo Una Lagrima", "Cree en Mi", and the pop cumbia "Completamente Enamorado", also received airplay. Despite "Yo Estare a Tu Lado" not gaining recognition, Cabrera praised it as an ode to true love, showcasing Astudillo and Vela's skillful writing and Jesse Garza's emotive performance on the requinto, which heightened the song's emotional impact.

=== 1996: Pete Astudillo y Grupo Futuro ===
In January 1996, Astudillo opted for a new appearance. He cut his long locks, going against EMI Latin and his label's manager, Lee Garza's advice. Astudillo jokingly cited piojos (head lice) as the reason for the change. Astudillo was inundated with requests from various musicians seeking material, among them were Liberación, Fugitivos, and Ramón Ayala. Astudillo debuted his band's new name, Grupo Futuro, during his concert at the Pure Country nightclub in Abilene, Texas. The band lineup remained mostly unchanged, with the addition of accordionist John Saenz. Astudillo co-headlined a sold-out concert in Odessa, Texas with Jennifer Peña, drawing a crowd of 18,000.

At the 1996 Tejano Music Awards, Astudillo received the nomination for Most Promising Band, Male Vocalist of the Year, Male Entertainer of the Year, and Song of the Year, along with Vela, for composing "Estupido Romantico". Cabrera anticipated Astudillo to win Most Promising Band, attributing it to the success of "Como Te Extrano", while Burr shared a similar expectation, foreseeing Astudillo's potential to secure several accolades owing to "Como Te Extrano"'s chart accomplishments. Astudillo won Most Promising Band, and began to be hailed as the "next big thing" in the Tejano market. By March 1996, Como Te Extrano was certified platinum (Latin) by the RIAA for shipments of 100,000 units in the U.S., while former percussionist for Los Dinos, Arturo Meza joined Astudillo's band.

At the 1996 Premio Lo Nuestro, Astudillo received the nomination for Male Regional Mexican Artist of the Year, New Regional Mexican Artist, as well as Song of the Year for "Como Te Extrano". Astudillo performed at the Six Flags' Music Mill Amphitheatre, becoming the third Tejano act to perform at the theme park, following Emilio Navaira and Selena. Astudillo recorded "Tu Robaste Mi Corazón", originally performed by Selena and Navaira, for the Siempre Selena (1996) album. Cabrera perceived the new rendition's inclusion on the album as "sort of for old times sake", while Chris Riemenshneider of the Austin American-Statesman characterized it as an energetic Tejano track.

At the 1996 BMI Latin Music Awards, "Bidi Bidi Bom Bom", "Si Una Vez", and "Amor Prohibido" received Song of the Year honors. Astudillo tied with Juan Luis Guerra for Songwriter of the Year. Astudillo expressed that being acknowledged as a songwriter held special significance for him, as he viewed writing as equally crucial to his artistry as performing. On March 9, 1996, Astudillo narrated a pay-per-view unaired 1991 Market Square concert of Selena y Los Dinos. For the first anniversary of Selena's death, Astudillo scheduled a tribute concert for the singer in Galveston, Texas along with Michael Salgado and Arnfulo Gonzales. "Si No Fui Yo", the second single released from Como Te Extrano, continued the band's success.

During Billboard's mid-year recap, Astudillo ranked as the sixth most-popular Regional Mexican Songs chart artist. "Como Te Extrano" ranked as the second-most popular song on the Regional Mexican Songs chart, and the album ranked at number two on the Regional Mexican Albums list, which enabled him to rank as the third-most-popular Regional Mexican Albums artist. Astudillo, along with other artists signed to EMI Latin, was acknowledged for contributing to the label's sustained dominance of the Latin music charts in 1996. "Como Te Extrano" ended 1996 as the fifth most-popular US Latin song as well as the second-most-popular US Regional Mexican Song, Como Te Extrano was the fourth best-selling Regional Mexican Album, while Astudillo ranked as the sixth most-successful regional Mexican artist of 1996 and the 22nd most-successful Latin songwriter of the year.

=== 1997–2000: Selena, Si Tu No Estas, and ¿Dónde Estás Amor? ===
Astudillo joined the cast of Selena (1997), a biographical film directed by Gregory Nava, portraying himself as a dancer and backup vocalist to Jennifer Lopez's portrayal of Selena. He considered it important to contribute to the film's success, drawing from his personal experiences with Selena to assist his co-stars. Astudillo struggled to contain his emotions during the film's premiere, finding it challenging to watch recreated moments he described as "the happiest moments of my life". Despite inconveniences such as early morning filming schedules as a result of cutting his hair, Astudillo actively promoted the film during a special edition of El Show de Cristina, and provided live performances to entertain extras during filming. His inclusion in the film's Houston Astrodome scene was seen as a recognition of his significance within Los Dinos by the producers.

For the Selena soundtrack, Astudillo recorded the tribute track, "Vivirás Selena" along with Graciela Beltrán, Bobby Pulido, the Barrio Boyzz, Navaira, and Peña. While Riemenschneider found "Vivirás Selena" to have lacked the distinctive Tejano flavor, he still regarded it as a pleasant tribute to Selena. Conversely, Mary Christina Vera, also from the Austin American-Statesman, disagreed with Riemenschneider's critique. She found the track to be one of the best recordings on the soundtrack, despite its departure from traditional Tejano beats. Vera felt the song was intended to be a slower, toned-down track.

At the 1997 BMI Latin Music Awards, Astudillo was awarded Songwriter of the Year. At the 1997 Tejano Music Awards, Astudillo received Song of the Year for "Como Te Extrano", Male Vocalist of the Year, and won Orchestra/Group Album of the Year for Como Te Extrano, and Overall Album of the Year nominations. In March 1997, Astudillo released his lead single, "Si Tu No Estas". The track debuted and peaked at number 37 on the Hot Latin Songs chart, on the week ending June 14, 1997. The album, Si Tu No Estas debuted and peaked at number 37 on the Top Latin Albums chart, on the week ending June 14, 1997.

At the 1997 Pura Vida Awards, Astudillo faced logistical issues that delayed the show's commencement as he was slated to co-host alongside George Rivas. Due to last-minute agreement forms presented by producers, Astudillo and other musicians, including A. B., declined to sign due to excessively restrictive terms. The terms granted rights to the musicians' vocal performances from that night for commercial purposes, without additional compensation to the artists or their labels, violating their label agreement. Tensions escalated backstage as producers issued ultimatums, warning that musicians who refused would not perform that night, resulting in an 11-hour standoff. Eventually, producers relented, allowing musicians to sign only the standard release forms. As a result of the delay, only a few artists could perform that evening.

To support Si Tu No Estas, Astudillo embarked on a tour. The majority of his concerts were done in Texas, while he ventured into Georgia, Florida, Michigan, and Arizona. Astudillo expressed satisfaction with the reception he had received during his tour, noting invitations to return to Georgia and Florida. Devoting eleven months of the year to touring, Astudillo confessed that he finds fulfillment in performance and would feel despondent without it. Si Tu No Estas failed to replicate the commercial success achieved by its predecessor, Como Te Extrano. Astudillo believed that Si Tu No Estas contained material of equal or superior quality, though acknowledged its success did not measure up to that of Como Te Extrano. He co-wrote with A. B. on "La Chica Sabrosura" (1997) for Lobo IV.

Astudillo was nominated for Song of the Year for "Si Tu No Estas", Male Entertainer of the Year, Male Vocalist of the Year, and Tejano Crossover Song of the Year for "No Lo Niego" at the 1998 Tejano Music Awards. Astudillo was featured on Puro Tejano en Vivo along with La Tropa F on March 25, 1998, and released a promotional jingle for the Laredo National Bank. He participated in VH1's Behind the Music episode that highlighted Selena on March 29.

In September 1998, Astudillo released his lead single, "¿Dónde Estás Amor?". Describing it as a romantic cumbia infused with accordion melodies, Astudillo highlighted the album's diverse offerings. Alongside norteño-style tracks reimagined in his distinctive manner, the album features mariachi compositions and a cumbia mariachi number. Astudillo aimed to cater to a broad audience, believing the album's varied content would resonate with younger and older listeners. He expressed his desire to write songs that defy industry standards, prioritizing songs that did well with fans over commercial material the label preferred.

On April 20, 1999, ¿Dónde Estás Amor? was released, and at the 1999 Tejano Music Awards, Astudillo received the nomination for Best Mariachi Song by a Tejano Artist for "No Lo Niego". Astudillo performed during the 41st annual Feria de Las Flores pageant on August 12, 2000, held at the Selena Auditorium within the Bayfront Convention Center. Astudillo became troubled by the lackluster sales of ¿Dónde Estás Amor?, despite his belief in its quality. He acknowledged that sales were disappointing, leading to concerns about future sales, his performance, and overall direction.

=== 2001–2002: Departure from Q-Productions, founding of Peace Rock Records ===
Astudillo decided to part ways with Q-Productions in 2001 due to "creative differences" regarding his career trajectory. He revealed that discussions with EMI Latin indicated a softening Tejano market, and the label suggested that he had already passed his professional peak. Negotiations with EMI Latin and Q-Productions failed to yield agreeable terms. Astudillo founded Peace Rock Records, an extension of Peace Rock Publishing. Astudillo remained active, remarking, "I'm a hands-on kind of guy", preferring not to await opportunities idly. Astudillo brainstormed ideas but failed to garner financial support from record executives who noted Tejano's decline. Astudillo lamented the genre's perceived stagnation, deeming it "not where it's at".

Astudillo ranked among the most appealing musicians in the Tejano market following his first independently released album, El Rey del Ritmo, in August 2001. Astudillo characterized the album as a fusion of diverse rhythms rooted in Tejano influences. The Corpus Christi Caller-Times and Cabrera described the album's material as having a musically varied sound. The title track climbed the Radio y Musica charts and received considerable airplay on Latin music stations across the country. Cabrera described the title track as a vibrant dance offering with robust percussion, complemented by an accordion melody and Astudillo's signature vocals. Astudillo began experimenting with vallenato-influenced tracks in his Tejano recordings, following the footsteps of other Tejano artists.

By 2002, Astudillo took a hiatus from music to care for his aging father. Additionally, he noticed a decline in bookings for his performances, which prompted him to reassess his career direction. He produced singer Sesi's Chiquita Pero Picosa (2001) album. Astudillo and A. B. wrote, "Yo No Fui" (2002), a song that revolves around a womanizer who habitually makes excuses for his actions, for Big Circo. The song merges norteño cumbia rhythms with the rock-infused vocals of accordionist and vocalist Big Boy. Writing for The Monitor, Joe Zepeda believed that the track would seamlessly blend in with the songs during Tejano's golden age in the early 1990s. Astudillo recorded "Eclipse", a duet with Denisse, on her debut album in 2002.

=== 2003–2009: Enfoque Musical and Selena ¡Vive! ===
On July 9, 2003, Astudillo announced plans to release his first album in over two years, emphasizing quality over frequency and aiming to reconnect with the Mexican music market. Astudillo remarked that the project had blended romantic cumbias, pop, Colombian influences, and rock elements. He wanted the album to showcase his diverse musical passions and wanted to target a younger audience. Astudillo initiated negotiations with Universal Music Group, Univision, and Sony for a distribution deal for his album.

In 2005, Astudillo became a co-host for Enfoque Musical, an entertainment TV program broadcast in South Texas. Astudillo took part in the all-star televised Selena ¡Vive!, a benefit concert commemorating the 10th anniversary of Selena's death, where he performed "Como Te Extrano". Juan Martin Ovalle of the Fort Worth Star-Telegram observed that Astudillo performed the track with full intensity. Olivia Ruiz of The Fresno Bee and Rogelio Olivas of the Tucson Citizen, regarded Astudillo's performance of "Como Te Extrano" as one of the most emotionally charged moments of the concert. Ruiz noted that Astudillo's rendition moved those in attendance to tears, including Selena's mother, Marcela. Astudillo was the master of ceremonies for the 2006 Little Miss Fitness held in McAllen.

=== 2010–present: Ruido Añejo and Pete Astudillo y Tekno-Mex ===
By 2010, Astudillo was the lead singer for his rock en español band Ruido Añejo. The group consisted of Astudillo, Ojeda, bassist Adriel Ramirez, guitar-producer Manuel "Meatt" Riojas, guitarist Ruben Rea, and drummer Frankie Diaz de Leon. The group's debut album, Salvación, was released in 2013. It took influences from Guns N' Roses, Matchbox Twenty, Train, Bon Jovi, and the Chris Perez Band. The album featured a revamped version of "Como Te Extrano" as well as a 1980s power ballad rendition of "Como la Flor", and the ballad "Quiero Llorar". Ruido Añejo strategically decided to debut their softer material at the 2013 Tejano Music Awards as a means to appeal to the traditional audience. They were concerned that performing the heavier songs might deter them.

Astudillo participated as one of the judges for TeleFutura's Buscando a la Doble de Selena (2010) competition show. He performed during the first annual Fiesta de la Flor in May 2016, and in March 2017. Astudillo collaborated on the Christmas music song "Que Empiece La Fiesta" (2015) with Stefani Montiel, Ricky Valenz, and Raul Sanchez. Astudillo recorded "Se Que Pensabas" with Grupo Quemado for their album, A Tribute to Joe "Wajo" Carmona (2017). Astudillo introduced his new band, Pete Astudillo and Tekno-Mex, during the October 2017 annual Bootfest in Victoria, Texas. The group consisted of Ojeda, Ricky Landeros, Juan Garza, Sonja de la Paz Garcia, and Diego Garcia. Sunny Sauceda recorded "Por La Madrugada" (2018) featuring Astudillo. In 2019, Astudillo released "El Rey del Ritmo" which featured Erick Sanchez. Astudillo recorded a duet with Isabel Marie on "Camina Conmigo" for her Sigueme (2019) album.

Due to the COVID-19 pandemic, Tekno Mex canceled their March 2020 show at San Antonio's Aztec Theatre and indefinitely suspended touring. Astudillo was slated to perform at Selena XXV, a live tribute concert that was scheduled to be held at the Alamodome and broadcast on Univision in April 2020. The concert was canceled due to the COVID-19 pandemic. In December 2018, Netflix green-lit Selena: The Series (2020-21), a two-part limited drama series based on Selena's life. In March 2020, Julio Macias was cast to portray Astudillo in the series. Following the release of Selena: The Series, which spotlighted Astudillo and Ojeda's origins, the Laredo Morning Times asserted that Astudillo "helped put Laredo on the map".

"Pelón", written by Astudillo and A. B. for Boyz of Kumbia, peaked at number 38 on Billboard's Regional Mexican Songs chart in April 2021. By May 2021, Astudillo had written over 100 songs. In 2021, he released "Separaditos", which was inspired by the COVID-19 pandemic. According to Astudillo, who promoted the track through a TikTok dance challenge, the song contained a positive message of hope. The track features cumbia rhythms with reggaeton and electric guitar by Garcia. In 2024, Astudillo released the corrido "Esta Es Pa' Mi Raza", after realizing he had yet to release a song about his family and upbringing. The track discusses the struggles of the American Dream and the sacrifices Astudillo's parents had made for him. On July 11, 2025, Pena released "Wakala", co-written with Astudillo.

== Artistic style ==
Astudillo's compositions exhibit a rhythmic cadence reminiscent of Selena's signature style. According to A. B., Astudillo contributed significantly to Selena y Los Dinos' repertoire. He noted that he would conceive the thematic concept, while Astudillo would collaborate in crafting the lyrical content. Their collaborative efforts frequently centered on personal narratives and vicarious experiences. Despite being indefinitely linked with Selena, Astudillo remains unperturbed by the persistent inquiries about his time with her, remaining proud of his origins. Tarradell credits Astudillo as the mastermind behind Selena's sound. He coauthored Selena's top-selling and most popular songs, cemented him into music history.

While often melancholic, Astudillo asserts that not all of his repertoire is depressing and finds authenticity to be paramount. Astudillo considers himself a meticulous songwriter who is open to unconventional ideas, such as in "Estupido Romantico". He prioritizes originality, pushing creative limits for impactful recordings and eschewing haste for distinction. Cabrera wrote that Astudillo infuses his musical arrangements with a blend of international influence and pop music. Astudillo emphasized delivering the best material he could write to avoid being regarded as substantive talent or a novelty act. The San Angelo Standard-Times praised Astudillo's albums for showcasing his "charismatic voice" through "well-written cumbias and ballads." Santiago Esparza of The Daily Journal hailed Astudillo as "the Latino Babyface".

Astudillo's musical style is characterized by his vocal croons and emotive songwriting. According to Cabrera, Astudillo possessed a distinctive voice and a recognizable appearance. His trademark long hair garnered admiration from fans who emulated his style. Astudillo's decision to cut his hair was driven by a desire for change. His compositions often blend traditional polka elements with a contemporary pop influence, a fusion influenced by his upbringing in Laredo. Astudillo was exposed to rock and roll as a child and listened to AC/DC, Iron Maiden, and Judas Priest, to new wave music and international Spanish musicians such as Jose Jose and Raphael, before ultimately embracing Tejano music. He also enjoys the works of Van Halen and Rush. Astudillo's fusion of Latin music with Afro-Caribbean rhythms garnered him acclaim with audiences, transcending Texas borders with a sophisticated sound, according to Marty Racine of the Houston Chronicle.

Cabrera found Astudillo to seamlessly combine his artistic flair with his vocal abilities, delivering an engaging and captivating live performance. Astudillo is known for his engaging stage presence and penchant for interaction with his audience. His performance style is characterized by its dynamic energy and infectious rhythms, often involving the crowd. He attributes his approach to concert performances to Selena, whose stage persona left a mark on Astudillo's performance style. During one of his performances, music critic John Leland of Newsweek, found Astudillo's performance as being a quintessential Tejano moment: a first-generation Mexican American blending the traditional roots of the cantina with contemporary vibes of video culture from northern America. Leland enjoyed Astudillo's fusion of his Tex-Mex music and the vernacular typically used in rap music and the music scene in the South Bronx. Elizabeth Campbell of the Fort Worth Star-Telegram discerned Astudillo's vocals as opulent and refined, amidst his tenure alongside Los Dinos on tour.

Astudillo has authored or collaborated on some of the most popular Tejano songs of the 1990s, including most of Selena's repertoire and "Estupido Romantico". John Lannert of Billboard magazine observed that Astudillo's impact on the US Latin music scene lies in his role as a songwriter collaborator. Astudillo was inducted into the Tejano Roots Hall of Fame by 2019. Astudillo expressed that while he may not be able to sing indefinitely, his ability to write will endure while he's alive.

== Philanthropy ==
Astudillo performed at the 1995 Texas Tours Tejano Super Car Show, and part of the proceeds were donated to benefit D.A.R.E. and Moms Demand Action. On November 27, 1996, Astudillo visited Miller High School in Corpus Christi, Texas, aiming to educate students about the perils associated with drugs and alcohol. Astudillo performed several songs during his visit, which was sponsored by the Coastal Bend AIDS Foundation, as part of the school district's Red Ribbon Week initiative. During a 1998 visit to Michigan, Mi Gente magazine spotlighted Astudillo's involvement in a series of visits to local schools. He conducted free mini-concerts and engaged with students, delivering talks on the dangers of substance abuse and gang involvement.

In April 1997, Astudillo participated in a fundraising autograph session with Little Joe, Eddie Gonzalez, Lisa Jimenez, and Gary Hobbs. For Labor Day 1997, Astudillo participated alongside other Q-Productions artists in a benefit concert to support the Corpus Christi Food Bank by raising food supplies and funds for the cause. Astudillo dressed as Santa Claus to fulfill a child's Christmas wish during the Cristina show. He brought gifts for the child and performed Christmas carols and "Feliz Navidad" after gifting the family a Christmas tree.

In October 1999, Astudillo participated in a free festival held at Robstown-Nueces County Park, sponsored by the Robstown Area Development Commission. The festival featured a variety of activities tailored to foster a family-oriented atmosphere, aimed at bringing the community together. He performed for a free concert sponsored by local sponsors at the 2000 Cinco de Mayo celebration in Corpus Christi. In 2017, Astudillo provided support for singer Devin Banda after she tearfully released a video on being cyberbullied.

== Personal life ==
In 1998, Astudillo and Eva Longoria shared a private room to bond before shooting the music video for "No Lo Niego". While Astudillo expressed there was chemistry between them, he refused to acknowledge if anything happened between them, telling El Norte to ask Longoria. During the filming of the video, Astudillo and Longoria shot kissing scenes, though it was removed during post-production. After filming, Astudillo and Longoria remained in contact until she departed to Los Angeles to pursue an acting career in 2000. Astudillo shares a home with his girlfriend, with whom he has been for 17 years. Although they are not married, he regards her as his wife. He has a 26-year-old stepdaughter, whom Astudillo considers his daughter.

On August 1, 2005, Astudillo received a driving under the influence citation after he registered three times over the legal blood alcohol limit. His Chevy Suburban crashed into barriers along a freeway loop in San Antonio. Astudillo called the event "minor" and denied being drunk behind the wheel and asked fans to not judge him, saying "We all make mistakes". In April 2015, Astudillo, in response to an interview about royalties, stated that he has continued to be paid well as a result of people continuing to purchase Selena albums and songs as well as requesting material from Selena on the radio. When asked what he has done with the royalties in the last two decades since Selena's death, Astudillo responded that it has fed him and his family and allowed him to live a comfortable life, though he is not very exuberant. He answered that he had lived a normal, quiet life, and thanked God that he could provide for his family, calling it "an incredible blessing".

== Discography ==
- Entregate a Mi (1992)
- Como Nadie (1993)
- Como Te Extrano (1995)
- Si Tu No Estas (1997)
- ¿Dónde Estás Amor? (1999)
- El Rey del Ritmo (2001)
- Salvación (2013)

== Works cited ==
- Anon. (2017a). "RIAA Certification > Baila Esta Cumbia (1990)". Recording Industry Association of America.
- Anon. (2017b). "RIAA Certification > Como la Flor (1992)". The Recording Industry Association of America.
- Anon. (2017c). "RIAA Certification > "Que Creias" (1992)". RIAA.com.
- Anon. (2017d). "RIAA Certification > "La Carcacha" (1992)". Recording Industry Association of America.
- Anon. (2017e). "RIAA Certification > "Amor Prohibido" (1994)". Recording Industry Association of America.
- Anon. (2017f). "RIAA Certification > "Bidi Bidi Bom Bom" (1994)". Recording Industry Association of America.
- Anon. (2017g). "RIAA Certification > "Techno Cumbia" (1994)". Recording Industry Association of America.
- Anon. (2017h). "RIAA Certification > "Si Una Vez" (1994)". Recording Industry Association of America.
- Anon. (January 15, 1992a). "1992 Tejano Music Awards Nominations". The Monitor – via Newspapers.com.
- Anon. (December 11, 1992b). "1993 Tejano Music Awards Nominations". El Paso Times – via Newspapers.com.
- Anon. (January 10, 1993a). "Fill Out, Mail Tejano Music Ballot by Friday To Make it Count". Corpus Christi Caller-Times – via Newspapers.com.
- Anon. (November 25, 1993b). "Tejano Singles > November 25, 1993". Austin American-Statesman – via Newspapers.com.
- Anon. (December 23, 1993c). "Tejano Singles > December 23, 1993". Austin American-Statesman – via Newspapers.com.
- Anon. (April 7, 1994a). "Tejano Singles > April 7, 1994". Austin American-Statesman – via Newspapers.com.
- Anon. (April 14, 1994b). "Tejano Singles > April 14, 1994". Austin American-Statesman – via Newspapers.com.
- Anon. (June 2, 1994c). "Tejano Singles > June 2, 1994". Austin American-Statesman – via Newspapers.com.
- Anon. (July 3, 1994d). "Tejano Singles > July 3, 1994". The Monitor – via Newspapers.com.
- Anon. (July 3, 1994e). "TV Listings > July 3, 1994". York Sunday – via Newspapers.com.
- Anon. (December 17, 1994f). "TV Listings > December 17, 1994". Albuquerque Journal – via Newspapers.com.
- Anon. (December 24, 1994g). "1994: The Year in Music". Billboard. Vol. 106, no. 52. p. 60. ISSN 0006-2510.
- Anon. (April 3, 1995a). "Family, Fans Bid Farewell to Slain Tejano Music Queen". Chicago Tribune – via Newspapers.com.
- Anon. (April 3, 1995b). "Tejano Stars to Perform on Saturday". The Odessa American – via Newspapers.com.
- Anon. (November 12, 1995c). "Pete Astudillo To Perform Live". The Odessa American – via Newspapers.com.
- Anon. (November 29, 1995d). "Ad Space". Victoria Advocate – via Newspapers.com.
- Anon. (December 12, 1995e). "Top Latin Albums > December 12, 1995". Billboard.com.
- Anon. (November 18, 1995f). "Pete Astudillo > Artist History > Regional Mexican Airplay". Billboard.com.
- Anon. (March 27, 1996a). "Univision Announces the Nominees for Spanish-Language Music's Highest Honors: Premio Lo Nuestro A La Musica Latina". PR Newswire. Gale A18135281 – via Gale Research.
- Anon. (September 15, 1996b). "Arranca filmacion de la cinta 'Selena'". El Norte (in Spanish). Gale A128393619 – via Gale Research.
- Anon. (September 5, 1996c). "Luces, camara... iSelena!". El Norte (in Spanish). Gale A128391717 – via Gale Research.
- Anon. (March 9, 1996d). "Unseen Selena Footage to be Broadcast on TV". The Monitor – via Newspapers.com.
- Anon. (March 24, 1996e). "Tejano Awards Honor Songs of Selena". El Paso Times – via Newspapers.com.
- Anon. (May 17, 1996f). "Astudillo, Other Upcoming Tejano Shows". Abilene Reporter-News – via Newspapers.com.
- Anon. (August 18, 1996g). "Jennifer y Los Jetz To Perform Here". The Seguin Gazette-Enterprise – via Newspapers.com.
- Anon. (December 28, 1996h). "The Year in Music, 1996". Billboard. Vol. 108, no. 52. p. 176.
- Anon. (January 13, 1996i). "Hot Latin Songs > January 13, 1996". Billboard. Vol. 108, no. 2. p. 80.
- Anon. (January 15, 1997). "Tiene Selena disco 'de pelicula'". Reforma (in Spanish). Gale A130019250 – via Gale Research.
- Anon. (June 21, 1997b). "Hot Latin Songs > June 21, 1997". Billboard. Vol. 109, no. 25. p. 96.
- Anon. (June 14, 1997c). "Top Latin Albums > June 14, 1997". Billboard.com.
- Anon. (January 26, 1998). "TTMA Announces Nominations for 18th Annual Show". Corpus Christi Caller-Times – via Newspapers.com.
- Anon. (March 23, 1998b). "Taping of 'Puro Tejano En Vivo' to Feature La Tropa F, Pete Astudillo". The Monitor – via Newspapers.com.
- Anon. (September 25, 1998c). "Tejano Singer Releasing New Single". New Braunfels Herald-Zeitung – via Newspapers.com.
- Anon. (September 25, 1998d). "Tejano Singer Astudillo Set to Release His First Single". Victoria Advocate – via Newspapers.com.
- Anon. (November 28, 1998e). "Topping The Charts Year By Year". Billboard. Vol. 110, no. 48.
- Anon. (September 7, 2000). "Homies, Astudillo to Perform at Jo's". San Angelo Standard-Times – via Newspapers.com.
- Anon. (August 23, 2001). "Tejano Fusion". Corpus Christi Caller-Times – via Newspapers.com.
- Anon. (August 1, 2005). "Tejano musician wrecks car, cited for DUI". UPI NewsTrack. Gale A134703284 – via Gale Research.
- Anon. (October 29, 2006). "9-Year-Old McAllen Girl Wins Title of Little Miss Fitness 2006". The Monitor – via Newspapers.com.
- Anon. (December 12, 2015). "Pete Astudillo, Stefani Montiel, Ricky Valenz & Raul Sanchez release Christmas collaboration [VIDEO]". Tejano Nation.
- Anon. (October 5, 2017). "Tejano group celebrates Selena's music". Victoria Advocate. Gale A508087728 – via Gale Research.
- Anon. (September 16, 2021). "From the National Recording Registry: 'Ven Conmigo' -- Selena (1990)". States News Service. Gale A675770204 – via Gale Research.
- Anon. (November 26, 2008). "Selena: Biography". Biography. 60 minutes in. A&E.
- Arrillaga, Pauline (March 31, 1996). "One Year Hasn't Diminished Sense of Loss". The Monitor – via Newspapers.com.
- Aguilar, Elvia (March 15, 2010). "Longtime Fan Captures Title As Selena Double". Corpus Christi Caller-Times – via Newspapers.com.
- Beltrán López, Luis Gerardo (January 14, 2021). "Los Bad Boyz, el grupo que abría para Selena Quintanilla y Los Dinos, ¿quiénes fueron?". El Debate (in Spanish). ProQuest 2478238289.
- Blanco-Cano, Rosana; Urquijo-Ruiz, Rita E. (2011). Global Mexican cultural productions (1st ed.). Palgrave Macmillan. ISBN 978-0-230-37039-5.
- Bolaños, César (December 7, 2020). "El Laredense que fue pieza clave en el éxito Selena". El Manana de Nuevo Laredo (in Spanish). ProQuest 2469038804.
- Burr, Ramiro (December 2, 1993). "Latin Notes". El Paso Times – via Newspapers.com.
- Burr, Ramiro (August 5, 1994). "Los Temerarios On the Rise". Fort Worth Star-Telegram – via Newspapers.com.
- Burr, Ramiro (November 3, 1995). "El Mundo De La Farandula, Tejano's Perez Branching Out". Fort Worth Star-Telegram – via Newspapers.com.
- Burr, Ramiro (March 22, 1996b). "Tejano Music Awards Still Need Fine Tuning". Fort Worth Star-Telegram – via Newspapers.com.
- Burr, Ramiro (May 18, 1996d). "Pete Astudillo Leads BMI Latin Music Awards". Billboard. Vol. 108, no. 20. p. 124.
- Burr, Ramiro (July 30, 1997b). "Pura Vida Imitates Worst of the TMA". Fort Worth Star-Telegram – via Newspapers.com.
- Burr, Ramiro (1999). The Billboard Guide to Tejano and Regional Mexican Music (1st ed.). Billboard Books. ISBN 0823076911.
- Burr, Ramiro (October 6, 2001). "Emergence of Indies". Billboard. Vol. 113, no. 40. Gale A78902170 – via Gale Research.
- Burr, Ramiro (March 6, 2003). "Moreno Gets Regular Airplay on MTV". San Angelo Standard-Times – via Newspapers.com.
- Cabrera, Rene (March 27, 1992). "Quintanilla Accompanist Releases Solo LP". Corpus Christi Caller-Times – via Newspapers.com.
- Cabrera, Rene (July 24, 1992b). "Selena, Mazz Plan Concerts Here". Corpus Christi Caller-Times – via Newspapers.com.
- Cabrera, Rene (March 26, 1993). "Pura Vida Music Awards Are Wednesday in SA". Corpus Christi Caller-Times – via Newspapers.com.
- Cabrera, Rene (November 19, 1993b). "Bands to Tape Canales Show; Selena, Mafia Will Visit Area". Corpus Christi Caller-Times – via Newspapers.com.
- Cabrera, Rene (January 7, 1994a). "Fans Will Pick Tejano Music Winners". Corpus Christi Caller-Times – via Newspapers.com.
- Cabrera, Rene (January 14, 1994b). "Most Promising Award Often Spells Tejano Fame". Corpus Christi Caller-Times – via Newspapers.com.
- Cabrera, Rene (March 18, 1994c). "TMAs Were Another Sweep for Selena, Emilio Navaira". Corpus Christi Caller-Times – via Newspapers.com.
- Cabrera, Rene (May 27, 1994d). "Selena Ex-Sideman Striking Out on His Own". Corpus Christi Caller-Times – via Newspapers.com.
- Cabrera, Rene (July 22, 1994e). "Heavyweights In the Ring This Weekend". Corpus Christi Caller-Times – via Newspapers.com.
- Cabrera, Rene (June 16, 1995a). "Upcoming Selena Album Mixes Old, New". Corpus Christi Caller-Times – via Newspapers.com.
- Cabrera, Rene (September 29, 1995b). "Follow Mazz's New Release All Over the Place". Corpus Christi Caller-Times – via Newspapers.com.
- Cabrera, Cloe (January 1, 1996a). "Hispanic Notables Reveal Resolutions". The Tampa Tribune – via Newspapers.com.
- Cabrera, Cloe (January 19, 1996b). "There's A Reason 'Como Te Extrano' Is At Top". Corpus Christi Caller-Times – via Newspapers.com.
- Cabrera, Rene (March 22, 1996c). "Tejano Takes a Bow". Corpus Christi Caller-Times – via Newspapers.com.
- Cabrera, Rene (October 18, 1996d). "Another Smash Selena CD Due Out". Corpus Christi Caller-Times – via Newspapers.com.
- Cabrera, Rene (May 2, 1997a). "Fortune Eluded Mike Salgado". Corpus Christi Caller-Times – via Newspapers.com.
- Cabrera, Rene (August 29, 1997b). "Music, Food, Friends at Ben Bolt Festival". Corpus Christi Caller-Times – via Newspapers.com.
- Cabrera, Rene (December 19, 1997c). "Tradition With a Twist". Corpus Christi Caller-Times – via Newspapers.com.
- Cabrera, Rene (January 22, 1999). "Ellos Features Seasoned Veterans". Corpus Christi Caller-Times – via Newspapers.com.
- Cabrera, Rene (October 22, 1999b). "Leonel Pulido Teaches What He Knows Best". Corpus Christi Caller-Times – via Newspapers.com.
- Cabrera, Rene (April 28, 2000). "Rattlesnake Round Up Ropes in Tejano Acts". Corpus Christi Caller-Times – via Newspapers.com.
- Cabrera, Rene (August 24, 2001). "Rhythm King Finds Muscle". Corpus Christi Caller-Times – via Newspapers.com.
- Campbell, Elizabeth (June 29, 1993). "Selena y Los Dinos Infect Tejano Rodeo With Dance Fever". Fort Worth Star-Telegram – via Newspapers.com.
- Castañeda, Eduardo (January 11, 2002). "Para tus Oidos". El Norte (in Spanish). Gale A126970227 – via Gale Research.
- Caicedo, Harry (June 4, 1989). "First Album in the Works". The Monitor – via Newspapers.com.
- Carrizales, Sylvia M. (June 3, 2020). "Tekno Mex singer Sonja De La Paz drops impressive solo debut 'Contigo'". Tejano Nation.
- Carrizales, Sylvia M. (March 1, 2024). "Pete Astudillo Discusses His Journey from Stardom with Selena to Solo Success and New Music". Tejano Nation.
- Cobo, Leila (August 24, 2002). "Latin Notas". Billboard. Vol. 114, no. 34. p. 95.
- Colloff, Pamela (April 2010). "Dreaming at of Her". Texas Monthly. Vol. 38, no. 4. Gale A222555398 – via Gale Research.
- Cordova, Randy (April 30, 1998). "Singer Feels Blessed By Connection to Selena". Arizona Republic – via Newspapers.com.
- Corcoran, Michael (April 3, 2005). "Dreaming of Selena". Austin American-Statesman – via Newspapers.com.
- Cortes Gonzalez, Maria (August 5, 1994). "Rising Star To Open Concert". El Paso Times – via Newspapers.com.
- Cortes Gonzalez, Maria (September 1, 1995). "Selena Songwriter Returns for El Paso Concert". El Paso Times – via Newspapers.com.
- Cortes Gonzalez, Maria (October 30, 2019). "Symphony Orchestra to Celebrate Selena and her Musical Legacy". El Paso Times – via Newspapers.com.
- Corpus, Lorena (September 20, 1996). "Ellos son la familia de 'Selena'". El Norte (in Spanish). Gale A128388317 – via Gale Research.
- Corpus, Lorena (April 4, 2005). "Presume Pete ser padrino de Eva". El Norte. ProQuest 311753048.
- Corpus, Lorena (April 1, 2015). "Sigue Pete viviendo de Selena". El Norte (in Spanish). Gale A407802890 – via Gale Research.
- de la Torre, Chito (June 16, 1996). "In his own words: Pete Astudillo's songs". La Prensa. ProQuest 368591129.
- Delgado, Rosa (July 17, 1994). "Meet: Pete Astudillo". Del Rio News-Herald – via NewspaperArchive.com.
- Esparza, Santiago (April 5, 1997). "Astudillo's Songwriting in Spotlight". The Daily Journal – via Newspapers.com.
- Falcon, Meagen (March 14, 2020). "Selena XXV Concert in SA to be Rescheduled". Corpus Christi Caller-Times – via Newspapers.com.
- Flores, Christy (August 15, 1997). "Dance Under the Stars with Astudillo, Tejano Singers". El Paso Times – via Newspapers.com.
- Flores, Daniel A. (March 29, 2015). "Singer Selena's Legacy Alive 20 Years After Death". The Monitor – via Newspapers.com.
- Garcia, Gus (January 29, 1997). "Pete Astudillo Here Friday Night". Del Rio News Herald – via Newspapers.com.
- Garcia, Julie (May 7, 2016). "Fans of La Flor Celebrate". Corpus Christi Caller-Times – via Newspapers.com.
- Gomez, Adrian (March 27, 2020). "'Absolutely Surreal' Julio Macias 'Incredible Grateful' for Promotion to Regular Role in 'On My Block'". Albuquerque Journal – via Newspapers.com.
- Gonzalez, James (March 2, 1997). "Salena's influence felt at music awards". Austin American-Statesman. Gale A128476849 – via Gale Research.
- Gonzalez, Fernando (March 11, 1994). "Secada, Estefan Among Awards Winners". The Monitor – via Newspapers.com.
- Grieser, Andy (April 26, 1996). "Fun In the Sun, A Little Early". Fort Worth Star-Telegram – via Newspapers.com.
- Guerra, Joey (November 1, 2017). "The stories behind Selena's legacy and biggest hits". Houston Chronicle.
- Hernández, Mary (July 6, 2003). "Vuelve a la carga". El Norte (in Spanish). Gale A125586620 – via Gale Research.
- Hackleman, Esther M. (January 27, 2017). "Festival to Feature Wax Figure of Singer". Corpus Christi Caller-Times – via Newspapers.com.
- Hunt, Robert (November 16, 1995). "The Arts". The Odessa American – via Newspapers.com.
- Rock n Roll James (March 27, 2024). "Pete Astudillo". YouTube (Podcast). Event occurs at 2:13:02.
- Lannert, John (October 21, 1995). "Hot Latin Songs > October 21, 1995". Billboard. Vol. 107, no. 42. p. 104.
- Lannert, John (November 11, 1995b). "Hot Latin Songs > November 11, 1995". Billboard. Vol. 107, no. 46. p. 124.
- Lannert, John (November 25, 1995c). "Hot Latin Songs > November 25, 1995". Billboard. Vol. 107, no. 47. p. 112.
- Lannert, John (May 4, 1996). "Billboard's Latin Awards Show Becomes Mas Grande, Mas Bueno". Billboard. Vol. 108, no. 18. p. 122.
- Lannert, John; Burr, Ramiro (August 17, 1996). "Ready and Willing Labels Scramble to Get Slices of Regional Mexican Pie". Billboard. Vol. 108, no. 33. p. 100.
- Lannert, John (October 11, 1997). "Int'l acts come back to Mexico City". Billboard. Vol. 109, no. 41. Gale A20058837 – via Gale Research.
- Lemieux, Josh (April 1, 1995). "Singing Star Selena Shot to Death". Stevens Point Journal – via Newspapers.com.
- Leland, John (October 23, 1995). "Born on the Border". Newsweek. Gale A17647095 – via Gale Research.
- Maldonado, Vilma (August 13, 1993). "Selena's Brother Pens Lyrics, backs up Tejano Star". The Monitor – via Newspapers.com.
- Maldonado, Vilma (January 7, 1994). "New Music Magazine Highlights Groups in Mexico". The Monitor – via Newspapers.com.
- Maldonado, Vilma (February 11, 1994b). "Preview / Pete Astudillo". The Monitor – via Newspapers.com.
- Maldonado, Vilma (July 8, 1994c). "La Sombra Produce Nuevo Video en Valle". Fort Worth Star-Telegram (in Spanish) – via Newspapers.com.
- Maldonado, Vilma (July 22, 1994d). "Artists Busy Touring, Releasing New Tejano Music". The Monitor – via Newspapers.com.
- Maldonado, Vilma (February 3, 1995a). "Lead Singer for Imagen Latina in Town Promoting Latest Release". The Monitor – via Newspapers.com.
- Maldonado, Vilma (January 19, 1997b). "La Onda". The Brownsville Herald – via NewspaperArchive.com.
- Maldonado, Vilma (March 20, 1997). "Movie Saddens, Inspires Tejano Artists". The Monitor – via Newspapers.com.
- Maldonado, Vilma (December 25, 1998). "A 'Cristina' Christmas". The Monitor – via Newspapers.com.
- Maldonado, Vilma (January 15, 1999). "Former Mazz Lead Singer Debuts New Era". The Monitor – via Newspapers.com.
- Martin, Annie (February 18, 2020). "Selena Quintanilla to be honored at tribute concert". UPI Entertainment News. Gale A614108788 – via Gale Research.
- Medina, John Henry (June 29, 2017). "Sesi offers free album download, readies for upcoming project". Tejano Nation.
- Medina, John Henry (September 11, 2017b). "Grupo Quemado releases 'Ay Como Cambian Las Cosas' ft. Jessy Serrata & David Lee Garza [AUDIO]". Tejano Nation.
- Medina, John Henry (October 31, 2017c). "Rising Tejano star Devin Banda stands up to cyberbully in emotional video". Tejano Nation.
- Medina, John Henry (December 20, 2018a). "Sunny Sauceda drops teaser of 'Por La Madrugada' video ft. Pete Astudillo". Tejano Nation.
- Medina, John Henry (January 16, 2019a). "Pete Astudillo speaks on upcoming collaborations, new album in 2019 [PODCAST]". Tejano Nation.
- Medina, John Henry (June 3, 2021). "Pete Astudillo blends Latin sounds for 'Separaditos' cumbia featuring positive message". Tejano Nation.
- Medina, John Henry (July 11, 2025). "Jennifer Peña Premieres Fiery Music Video for 'Wakala'". Tejano Nation.
- Molina, Rafael (June 9, 2001). "La industria Tex-Mex". Reforma (in Spanish). Gale A129109456 – via Gale Research.
- Mortensen, Eleanor (June 18, 1995). "Willie Nelson to Serenade the Fishes at Aquarium's Birthday Party". Corpus Christi Caller-Times – via Newspapers.com.
- Mottola, Tommy (2016). A New America: How and Music Reshaped the Culture and Future of a Nation and Redefined My Life. Penguin Books. ISBN 978-0451467782.
- Navarro, Juan Manuel (March 27, 1997). "'Pudo haber sido la numero uno'". El Norte (in Spanish). Gale A128278694 – via Gale Research.
- Ovalle, Juan Martin (April 9, 2005). "Y El Espirtu de Selena Reino". Fort Worth Star-Telegram (in Spanish) – via Newspapers.com.
- Olivas, Rogelio (April 14, 2005). "Decade After Selena's Death, Pals Shine In a Touching Concert". Tucson Citizen – via Newspapers.com.
- Oliva, John (May 12, 2021). "Meet the Real People Behind Neftlix's 'Selena: The Series'". Corpus Christi Caller-Times – via Newspapers.com.
- Parédez, Deborah (2009). Selenidad: Selena, Latinos, and the Performance of Memory. Duke University Press. ISBN 978-0-8223-9089-3.
- Patoski, Joe Nick (1996). Selena: Como La Flor. Little Brown and Company. ISBN 0-316-69378-2.
- Pérez, Chris (2012). To Selena, with Love. Penguin Books. ISBN 978-1-101-58026-4.
- Perez, Isamel (October 5, 2017b). "Tejano Group Celebrates Selena's Music". Victoria Advocate – via Newspapers.com.
- Edward James Olmos (narrator), Jose Behar (executive producer), Abraham Quintanilla (executive producer), Claribel Cuevas (associate producer), Randal J. Edwards (associate producer), Ila von Hasperg (editor), Jeffrey Coulter (producer), Cecelia Miniucchi (director) (April 1, 1997). Selena Remembered (Documentary). Corpus Christi, Texas: EMI Latin Productions, Q-Productions.
- Quintanilla, Selena (2002). Selena. EMI Latin (Media notes). A. B. Quintanilla (producer), Suzette Quintanilla (spoken liner notes producer). 724354099403.
- Quintanilla, Selena (2002a). Entre a Mi Mundo (Media notes). A. B. Quintanilla (producer), Suzette Quintanilla (spoken liner notes producer). EMI Latin.
- Quintanilla, Selena (2002b). Ven Conmigo (Media notes). A. B. Quintanilla (producer), Suzette Quintanilla (spoken liner notes producer). EMI Latin.
- Racine, Marty (April 24, 2001). "Cultures are there for the listening". Houston Chronicle. ProQuest 395774358.
- Ragland, Cathy (February 27, 1996a). "Tejano tips hat to conjunto; Award nominations for accordion-led bands". Austin American-Statesman. Gale A72921644 – via Gale Research.
- Ragland, Cathy (April 30, 1996b). "Top Tejano songwriters win awards". Austin American-Statesman. Gale A67394256 – via Gale Research.
- Riemenschneider, Chris (November 9, 1996). "Siempre Selena' proves singer's range of talent". Austin American-Statesman. Gale A67352739 – via Gale Research.
- Riemenschneider, Chris (November 9, 1996b). "'Siempre Selena' Proves Singer's Range of Talent". Austin American-Statesman – via Newspapers.com.
- Riemenschneider, Chris (March 22, 1997a). "'Selena' movie CD lacks her talent, Tejano flavor". Austin American-Statesman. Gale A67259618 – via Gale Research.
- Riemenschneider, Chris (February 28, 1997b). "Tejano Music Awards to be handed out Saturday". Austin American-Statesman. Gale A67262348 – via Gale Research.
- Riemenschneider, Chris (April 19, 1997c). "Best Bets". Austin American-Statesman. Gale A67255727 – via Gale Research.
- Riemenschneider, Chris (January 30, 1998). "Street Soundz". Austin American-Statesman. Gale A67201626 – via Gale Research.
- Rivas, Jorge (March 31, 2011). "Remembering Selena's Trailblazing Music". ColorLines. Archived from the original on July 1, 2017.
- Rivera, Anissa (November 28, 1996). "Taking a Stand". Corpus Christi Caller-Times – via Newspapers.com.
- Rodriguez, Estella (April 16, 1995). "Friends Remember Selena". Laredo Morning Times. "Pete met Selena in September 1988 when he and another Laredoan, Joe Ojeda, keyboard player with Los Dinos, opened up for her band when they played at Rox-Z's nightclub. Pete and Joe opened up for Selena y Los Dinos for the next two months and in December 1988, they became part of Selena's band."
- Rodriguez, Lois M. (March 29, 1996). "Weekend Picks". Galveston Daily News – via NewspaperArchive.com.
- Ross, Paige (August 11, 2000). "Feria Queen Will Be Crowned Saturday at 41st Annual Event". Corpus Christi Caller-Times – via Newspapers.com.
- Ruiz, Paula; Navarro, Juan Manuel (July 4, 1996). "Yolanda si estara con 'Selena'". El Norte (in Spanish). Gale A128408287 – via Gale Research.
- Ruiz, Olivia (April 13, 2005). "Selena Vive Tribute". The Fresno Bee – via Newspapers.com.
- Salas, Maria (March 31, 2020). "Selena's impact on Laredo remembered 25 years after her death". Laredo Morning Times.
- Saldana, Hector (October 15, 2013). "Tejano artists take rock stage". Mysa.
- Stavans, Ilan (2014). Latin music : musicians, genres, and themes. Greenwood. ISBN 978-0-313-34395-7.
- Smith, Nathan (December 29, 2020). "Selena is Forever". Texas Music Magazine.
- Soriano, Ashley (May 6, 2021). "Former Selena band member looks back on a legacy". KGNS.TV.
- Tarradell, Mario (December 31, 1995). "Selena's Murder Skewed the Tejano Music Scene for 1995". The Monitor – via Newspapers.com.
- Tarradell, Mario (July 14, 1996). "Heir Apparent Astudillo is royalty on his own merits". The Dallas Morning News. ProQuest 283271658.
- Tarradell, Mario (March 4, 1997). "Youth Named Tejano's Top Female Entertainer". The Park City Daily News – via Newspapers.com.
- Tamayo, Martin (June 23, 2020). "Conoce las canciones mexicanas más famosas de la de la historia en los EU". El Sol de Sinaloa.
- Vera, Mary Christina (April 3, 1997). "We get letters the price isn't right 'Selena' soundtrack excels". Austin American-Statesman. Gale A67254489 – via Gale Research.
- Verna, Paul (January 6, 1996). "Album Reviews" (PDF). Billboard. Vol. 108, no. 1. p. 105.
- Verhovek, Sam Howe (April 1, 1995). "Grammy-Winning Singer Selena Killed in Shooting at Texas Motel". The New York Times. p. 1. Archived from the original on July 20, 2016.
- Wener, Ben (April 15, 1999). "CD Spins". Arizona Republic – via Newspapers.com.
- Zepeda, Joe (August 30, 2002). "Behind the Mask of Big Circo Lies a Tejano Band". The Monitor – via Newspapers.com.
