= Joe Ojeda =

Tejano keyboardist (born 1968)

- Born: Jose Ojeda; 1968 (age 57–58); Laredo, Texas
- Genres: Tejano, cumbia, Rock en español
- Occupations: Keyboardist; songwriter; arranger; record engineer
- Instrument: keyboards
- Years active: 1985–present
- Labels: EMI Latin, Hollywood Records, Q-Productions, Peace Rock Records, Factoria Sounds, Joe Ojeda Music
- Formerly of: Los Bad Boyz; Selena y Los Dinos; The Chris Pérez Band; Ruido Añejo; Pete Astudillo y Tekno-Mex
- Spouse: Raquel (m. 1996)
- Website: Official website

Jose "Joe" Ojeda (born in 1968) is an American keyboardist and songwriter. Demonstrating a proclivity for music from an early age, Ojeda began assembling a band and eventually partnered with Pete Astudillo to form Los Bad Boyz. The duo performed locally until a Laredo-based DJ secured them a regular slot at a local nightclub. Their performances gained the favor of the club's staff and management, who recommended them as an opening act for Selena y Los Dinos. Impressed by their stage presence and musicality, the group's manager, Abraham Quintanilla, and the members of Los Dinos invited Los Bad Boyz to serve as regular openers. In December 1988, Ojeda and Astudillo integrated into Selena y Los Dinos, with Ojeda taking on the role of second keyboardist alongside Ricky Vela.

Ojeda and Astudillo's influence was featured in Selena (1989), their first studio album to feature compositional and production input. A.B. Quintanilla, the group's bassist and producer-songwriter, was particularly drawn to Ojeda and Astudillo's integration of cumbia music. He encouraged the adoption of this stylistic blend, recognizing its potential to broaden the group's appeal and infuse an "international flavor" into their sound. Their collaborative influence helped diversify the band's sonic identity beyond its earlier repertoire. Ojeda co-developed the foundational arrangement for "Baila Esta Cumbia" (1990), a track that marked a significant commercial breakthrough for the group in Mexico.

Following Selena's death in March 1995, Ojeda took a hiatus from music. In 1996, he co-founded The Chris Pérez Band with Los Dinos guitarist Chris Pérez. Ojeda co-wrote much of Resurrection (1999), which won the Grammy Award for Best Latin Rock or Alternative Album in 2000. After the release of their second album, Una Noche Más (2002), Ojeda withdrew from music to focus on his family. In the early 2010s, Ojeda briefly explored rock music with Ruido Añejo before returning to Tejano music with Astudillo in the group Pete Astudillo y Tekno-Mex. Touring ceased indefinitely following the COVID-19 pandemic. The release of Selena: The Series (2020-21) on Netflix reignited Ojeda's interest in performance, prompting him to pursue a solo career.

== Life and career ==
=== 1968–1988: Early career and Los Bad Boyz ===
Jose "Joe" Ojeda was born in 1968 in Laredo, Texas. From a young age, Ojeda displayed an inclination toward music, often choosing to listen and watch his uncles play guitar rather than playing with his cousins. In 1978, after persistent requests, his mother bought him a used partially broken organ. Ojeda would turn on the radio to play along, developing his skills through informal practice.

In 1985, Ojeda began searching for a vocalist for his band. A mutual friend introduced him to Pete Astudillo. Ojeda and Astudillo bonded over their shared musical tastes. Together, they formed Los Bad Boyz and debuted at the reception hall of Astudillo's brother, Rogelio, who owned a catering business. Rogelio frequently recommended them to customers who could not afford live music. Los Bad Boyz struggled to book bigger gigs, often facing rejection from promoters, even when offering to perform for free. Astudillo believed their lack of recognition and the skepticism surrounding a two-person band contributed to these setbacks.

Frustrated by these challenges, Ojeda and Astudillo considered quitting music. However, local DJ The Bird Locutor #2 discovered them during a flea market performance. In August 1988, The Bird gave them a regular Tuesday night slot at Rox-Z in Laredo during Tejano nights, albeit unpaid. Although largely unnoticed by the audience, their music resonated with the club's staff and owners. Recognizing their potential The Bird suggested that Los Bad Boyz open for bigger acts. In September 1988, they opened for Selena y Los Dinos, a band featuring lead singer Selena, A.B. Quintanilla as producer-songwriter and bassist, Suzette Quintanilla on drums, Ricky Vela on keyboards, and Jesse Ybarra on guitar. Managed by the Quintanilla siblings' father, Abraham Quintanilla, the band had already become one of Texas's most requested Tejano groups on radio stations.

Initially skeptical of a two-person act, Abraham was impressed by Los Bad Boyz's performance. After the show, he approached them, inquiring about their management and offering his business card. Soon after, Abraham asked them to join Selena y Los Dinos on tour as an opening act, which they accepted. At the time, Ojeda was working at Auto Shack and found Abraham's offer appealing, as he disliked his job. Los Bad Boyz's first gig opening for Selena y Los Dinos was in Robstown, Texas. En route, Ojeda and Astudillo were pulled over in Agua Dulce, Texas, where police discovered Ojeda had unpaid tickets and arrested him.

Astudillo contacted Abraham, who persuaded the police chief to release Ojeda. During sound check, Astudillo asked Ojeda to extend their intro, but in doing so, Ojeda accidentally blew out one of Los Dinos' tweeters. Abraham stormed on-stage and told Ojeda he would not be paid. Nevertheless, Ojeda held Abraham in high regard, seeing him as fair and driven to push both bands to their best. He often heard Abraham tell his son A.B. to "sound good", viewing him as a coach-like figure with high standards for performance. Although Abraham was hesitant to officially bring Los Bad Boyz into the group due to financial concerns and the band's early success, A.B. gradually convinced him. On December 25, 1988, after a performance in Midland, Texas, Ojeda and Astudillo officially joined Selena y Los Dinos, with Ojeda as the second keyboardist and arranger and Astudillo taking on multiple roles in the band.

=== 1989–1995: Selena y Los Dinos ===
During the 1989 Tejano Music Awards, Rick Trevino invited Selena y Los Dinos to be the opening act for the awards ceremony after La Sombra declined the offer. Representatives from CBS Records and newly formed EMI Latin attended the awards event to scout for new musical acts. EMI Latin's president, Jose Behar, wanted to sign Selena y Los Dinos to his label, while CBS was offering twice EMI's offer. Abraham found EMI Latin's proposal appealing due to the potential for a crossover deal, and he intended for his children to be the first musicians to sign with the company.

The production of the group's debut album began in June 1989. The goal of Selena was to be an introduction into the international Latin music market, with future sights into an English-language crossover. The band became "a bit more trendier and a little bit cutting-edge" on Selena with experimental production and songwriting. It was the first album with any production and songwriting assistance from Astudillo and Ojeda. Rock 'n' Roll James, host of Puro Tejano, a TV segment that aired in South Texas in the 1990s, observed that following the addition of Ojeda and Astudillo to Selena y Los Dinos, the group's repertoire became markedly more diverse in musical styles compared to their earlier recordings. He believed that A.B. recognized in them an "international flavor" capable of propelling the band to greater prominence.

A.B. was particularly fascinated by Ojeda and Astudillo's incorporation of cumbia music when they were a duo and insisted that Vela and he incorporate their style in future recordings. Ojeda and Vela learned how to complement each other as keyboardists. Ojeda believed he was the raw talent and saw Vela, who held a music degree, as being "school talent" who was a professional and an expert. Ojeda enjoyed recording "Amame, Quiereme" for Selena due to its lush, synth and keyboard-driven soundscape. The track was nominated for Vocal Duo of the Year at the 1990 Tejano Music Awards.

Selena y Los Dinos frequently incorporated cover songs into their live repertoire, with "Juana la Cubana" being a recurring selection. During one performance, Astudillo prompted Ojeda to open the song with a solo keyboard introduction. Ojeda improvised a syncopated riff with rhythmic embellishments that captured Astudillo's attention. Astudillo urged him to retrain the motif. After the concert, he requested that Ojeda reproduce the passage; however, Ojeda, having improvised the figure spontaneously, struggled to recall the precise voicing and articulation. Surrounded by the band, Ojeda eventually reconstructed the phrase, enhancing it with additional harmonic layers and rhythmic complexity. A.B. responded favorably to the arrangement, which ultimately served as the foundational groove and melodic framework for "Baila Esta Cumbia" (1990).

The band engaged in pre-production sessions at A.B.'s house, where Abraham would regularly drop by to observe their progress. Both Ojeda and Abraham championed the idea of including Selena's cover "La Tracalera" for their second studio album, Ven Conmigo (1990), arguing that it could serve as their breakout hit. In contrast, "Baila Esta Cumbia" was initially dismissed as unlikely to achieve commercial success. "Baila Esta Cumbia" ultimately launched Selena y Los Dinos' popularity in Mexico, a market traditionally resistant to Tejano acts. The song was later certified 6× platinum by the Recording Industry Association of America (RIAA).

For Entre a Mi Mundo (1992), the group diversified their sound, Ojeda brought traditional "street music" from Laredo. He helped A.B. with choosing the title for "La Carcacha". The album became the group's "breakthrough album", and ranked second in Billboard magazine's Regional Mexican Albums all-time best-sellers chart in 1994. In March 1994, Selena released Amor Prohibido, critics called it the group's "crowning achievement" and the singer's best work. As of March 2024, Amor Prohibido has been certified 41× platinum (Latin), denoting 2.46 million album-equivalent units sold. Amor Prohibido is the second-highest certified Latin album in the United States trailing only her posthumous album Dreaming of You (1995). Amor Prohibido is the fourth best-selling Latin album of all-time in the US with over 1.246 million copies sold as of October 2017. The recording has been ranked as the best-selling Tejano album of the 1990s, and the best-selling Tejano album of all time. On March 31, 1995, Selena was shot and killed. Ojeda was the last Los Dinos member to be informed, as he slept through constant phone calls from the band. He rushed to the hospital, where he was met with a weeping Abraham who embraced him and told him the news.

=== 1996–2002: The Chris Pérez Band ===
Ojeda struggled to cope with Selena's death, avoiding her music for an extended period. He credited his wife and daughters with providing the emotional support that helped him navigate the grief and begin to heal. Ojeda co-wrote tracks on Astudillo's Como Te Extrano (1995). Rene Cabrera of the Corpus Christi Caller-Times, noted his contribution on the album alongside former Los Dinos members, saying few know how to craft recordings like they do. By March 1996, Ojeda begun training as a recording engineer at Q-Productions.

In early 1996, Pérez and John Garza met at an Extreme concert. Believing music could serve as a cathartic outlet for Pérez, A.B. facilitated an impromptu jam session that included Ojeda. The trio's chemistry inspired them to continue collaborating, ultimately forming The Chris Pérez Band, focusing on being a bilingual rock band. Initially, they considered Cinco Souls but quickly abandoned it, reasoning that Pérez's name would inevitably identify the band. Garza later remarked, "We're a band where everyone gets their moment to shine on stage, and that's what truly matters—to me and to Chris." Ojeda found his time with the band helpful for his grieving process. Although all three members had roots in Tejano music, their passion leaned heavily toward rock. The lineup expanded to include bassist Adreil Ramirez and drummer Jorge Palacios. Despite their enthusiasm, the band faced skepticism and hostility due to their Tejano origins. Vice president of A&R Julian Raymond and Arista Records executive Cameron Randle saw the group's potential for crossover success. Among their supporters was Carlos Santana, who became a friend and advocate. Randle described the band as standing at the crossroads of American pop music, seeing them as emblematic of cultural fusion.

In 1997, Ruben Gonzales portrayed Ojeda in Selena (1997), a Warner Bros. biographical film directed by Gregory Nava. Ojeda, who joined The Chris Pérez Band as a keyboardist, played a pivotal role in co-writing much of their debut album, Resurrection (1999). The album's lead single, "Best I Can", offered a poignant reflection on Pérez's life following Selena's death. Ojeda believed Selena would have supported Pérez's foray into rock, noting her unwavering encouragement of his passions. Resurrection became the first rock album released under Hollywood Records, with USA Today naming The Chris Pérez Band among the top 10 acts poised for crossover success. The album became a critically praised recording, and the group began opening for Maná.

The track, "Best I Can", received promotion on mainstream rock and Top 40 radio, while "Por Que Te Fuiste?" was targeted at Latin and Tejano stations. Among Latino audiences, Pérez's name initially overshadowed the music itself. Conversely, in mainstream markets where his fame was less known, listeners focused on the music. It was a dynamic that the band fully embraced, as it aligned with their artistic aspirations. Ojeda wrote "Solo Tu" as a sentimental ballad but Pérez insisted on turning it into a rock song for the album. Pérez introduced The Chris Pérez Band at the 1998 Tejano Music Awards. Their debut album, Resurrection was released in May 1999.

In August 1999, The Chris Pérez Band participated in the month-long Watcha Tour, a traveling showcase of American and Latin American bands specializing in Rock en Español. The writer from The Los Angeles Times described Ojeda as a pivotal force within the band, having co-written much of the album's tracks. While some critics dismissed the group as overly formulaic, the band defended their artistic choices, asserting that their pursuit of a classic rock sound was an intentional reflection of their identity as Mexican Americans from South Texas. Writing for the Rolling Stone magazine, Ed Morales felt that Resurrection is anchored by Ojeda's "jazzy Tejano" vibes. Resurrection won the Grammy Award for Best Latin Rock or Alternative Album at the 2000 Grammy Awards, following the group's performance at Woodstock '99, and headlining a tour with The John Popper Project.

The Chris Pérez Band decided to take a hiatus between recording their second album, while Pérez helped A.B. with his Kumbia Kings band. From September to December 2001, The Chris Pérez Band began recording their second studio album, Una Noche Mas (2002) under Q-Productions. The group decided to release a full-length Spanish-language Tejano album mixed with guitar-led cumbia and pop tracks. Their lead single, "Dime Por Qué Te Fuiste", was released in April 2002. Ojeda also provided production and songwriting assistance for Q-Production artists Veronica Castro and Jennifer Peña.

=== 2003–2016: Break and return to music ===
Ojeda took a break from music and decided to help his sister sell computer software and payment terminals, while also handling customer service for her business. Though he missed performing, he valued the time spent with his family. Ojeda said he felt grateful to have witnessed his daughters grow up and been present in their lives during his hiatus. Ojeda felt it would have been an experience he would have missed had he continued touring. In 2004, he participated in a press conference for Selena ¡Vive! (2005), reuniting with Los Dinos. In 2006, Ojeda joined the Latin alternative rock band Sonido Azul as their keyboardist for a single concert. The lineup included former Chris Pérez Band vocalist John Garza, Adriel Ramirez, drummer-percussionist John Gomez, and David Galvan. The band was formed in response to Gomez's hope of improving the quality of life for his infant daughter, who had been diagnosed with Aicardi Syndrome.

By 2010, Ojeda joined as a keyboardist for the rock en español band Ruido Añejo. The group consisted of Astudillo, bassist Ramirez, guitar-producer Manuel "Meatt" Riojas, guitarist Ruben Rea, and drummer Frankie Diaz de Leon. The group's debut album, Salvación, was released in 2013. It took influences from Guns N' Roses, Matchbox Twenty, Train, Bon Jovi, and the Chris Pérez Band. The album featured a revamped version of "Como Te Extrano" as well as a 1980s power ballad rendition of "Como la Flor", and the ballad "Quiero Llorar". Ruido Añejo strategically decided to debut their softer material at the 2013 Tejano Music Awards as means to appeal to the traditional audience. They were concerned that performing the heavier songs might deter them.

Ojeda reunited with A.B. for his mariachi recording "Nací para Sufrir" on his La Vida de un Genio (2010), providing keyboard assistance. Ojeda and Astudillo performed at the 2015 Tejano Music Awards, the event held a tribute to Selena.

=== 2017–present: Pete Astudillo y Tekno-Mex, and solo career ===
During the October 2017 annual Bootfest in Victoria, Texas, Astudillo introduced his new band, Pete Astudillo and Tekno-Mex. The group consisted of Ojeda, Ricky Landeros, Juan Garza, Sonja de la Paz Garcia, and Diego Garcia. Due to the COVID-19 pandemic, Tekno Mex canceled their March 2020 show at San Antonio's Aztec Theatre and indefinitely suspended touring.

In December 2018, Netflix greenlit Selena: The Series (2020-21), a two-part limited drama series based on Selena's life. In March 2020, Carlos Alfredo Jr. was cast to portray Ojeda in the series. Alfredo contacted Ojeda after he got the role. Following the show's release, which explored the origins of Astudillo and Ojeda in the band, Angelica Perez of UWIRE, admitted she had not known about them until watching the show. She noted that her mother recognized them, having attended a Selena concert. Critics and fans felt that Selena: The Series sidelined its titular character, focusing instead on the patriarchs in the Quintanilla family. Ojeda expressed disappointment with how he was portrayed in the series, though he was involved with the show, arguing that the series failed to reflect his contributions to Selena's music. He claimed to have initiated or helped shape the melodies of several of her songs but was not credited accordingly in the show. One example he cited was "Baila Esta Cumbia", a track for which he received no formal recognition, despite his assertion that he had helped craft its melody. Although Ojeda described Abraham, who supported the series, as a businessman, he noted that during his time with Los Dinos, Abraham treated him well and ensured he was "taken care of".

After the series premiered, Ojeda decided to pursue a solo career and release his music. In April 2020, Perez and Ojeda released "Just Say Goodbye", using the Chris Pérez Band name. Ojeda released his debut solo single "Dueña de tu Cama" in collaboration with Victoria La Mala, Yorch, and Pérez. Jessica Roiz of Billboard called it an "edgy hip-hop-infused cumbia track" that blends traditional cumbia melodies with elements of urban pop and rock. The track follows the artists' collaboration on the corrido "Nuestra Tierra", featured on Victoria La Mala's Soy Mala (2021). In March 2022, Ojeda released "Bombear La Sangre" with Victoria La Mala, Yorch, and Pérez. Ojeda released "Maldito Castigo" featuring lead vocals by Lorena Gomez in October 2024, and announced his tribute band for Selena, Tributo A La Reina. On New Year's Eve 2024, Ojeda's band Tributo A La Reina, headlined a tribute performance in Laredo, Texas, performing Selena songs to patrons.

In 2024, Ojeda spoke about his plans to write a book about his life and career.

== Personal life ==
Ojeda married Raquel in 1996. His first daughter was born in 1998, and his younger daughter, Mia, assists with his social media accounts. Ojeda has been diagnosed with ADHD, and spoke out about never reading any music sheets. Ojeda is a fan of the Dallas Cowboys, and his musical influences are Los Angeles Azules, Ricky Martin, Maná, Intocable, Post Malone, and Bad Bunny.

In March 2025, Ojeda visited and read to students at Christopher Macdonell Elementary School as part of the annual Family Reading Night for Read Across America Week. While at the event, Ojeda stressed the importance of putting children's needs first when it comes to education and literacy.

== Works cited ==
- Anon. (n.d.a). "RIAA Gold & Platinum > Amor Prohibido". RIAA.com. Archived from the original on August 21, 2016.
- Anon. (n.d.b). "RIAA Diamaente Awards". RIAA.com.
- Anon. (November 26, 2008). "Selena: Biography". Biography. A&E.
- Anon. (November 17, 2017b). "Gold & Platinum". RIAA.
- Anon. (October 5, 2017). "Tejano group celebrates Selena's music". Victoria Advocate. Gale A508087728 – via Gale Research.
- Anon. (April 15, 2010). "Revivira a Los Dinos". Mural. Gale A223890685 – via Gale Research.
- Anon. (December 30, 2024). "Joe Ojeda, Former Member of Selena y Los Dinos, Brings Selena Tribute to Laredo for New Year's Eve". Tejano Nation.
- Ali, Lorraine (December 2, 2020). "Netflix's disappointing 'Selena: The Series' fails to give the singer a voice". Los Angeles Times.
- Armstrong, Gene (August 13, 1999). "Lopez, Perez also fly the flag of Latino pop". Arizona Daily Star. Gale A131336784 – via Gale Research.
- Beltrán López, Luis Gerardo (January 14, 2021). "Los Bad Boyz, el grupo que abría para Selena Quintanilla y Los Dinos, ¿quiénes fueron?". El Debate (in Spanish). ProQuest 2478238289.
- Berman, Judy (December 2, 2020). "Who Was Selena? Netflix's New Series Doesn't Have a Clue". Time.
- Bolaños, César (December 7, 2020). "El Laredense que fue pieza clave en el éxito Selena". El Manana de Nuevo Laredo (in Spanish). ProQuest 2469038804.
- Burr, Ramiro (May 8, 1999). "Perez lows Bilingual Set". Billboard. Gale A54591271 – via Gale Research.
- Burr, Ramiro (April 16, 2002). "'Mas' Tejano for Perez ; Latino rocker, Selena's widower, returns to familiar ground with his new album". San Antonio Express-News. ProQuest 262121458.
- Cabrera, Rene (March 27, 1992). "Quintanilla Accompanist Releases Solo LP". Corpus Christi Caller-Times – via Newspapers.com.
- Cabrera, Rene (January 19, 1996). "There's A Reason 'Como Te Extrano' Is At Top". Corpus Christi Caller-Times – via Newspapers.com.
- Caicedo, Harry (June 4, 1989). "First Album in the Works". The Monitor – via Newspapers.com.
- Carrizales, Sylvia M. (June 3, 2020). "Tekno Mex singer Sonja De La Paz drops impressive solo debut 'Contigo'". Tejano Nation.
- Carrizales, Sylvia M. (March 1, 2024). "Pete Astudillo Discusses His Journey from Stardom with Selena to Solo Success and New Music". Tejano Nation.
- Carlos, Marjon (September 29, 2016). "The Enduring Style Influence of Selena". Vogue. Archived from the original on April 5, 2018.
- Claudio, Vanessa; Gomez, Karla (May 21, 2021). "Selena Quintanilla: Su viudo rompe el silencio". Suelta la Sopa (in Spanish). Telemundo.
- Cobo, Leila (October 19, 2002). "Singles Review". Billboard. Vol. 114, no. 42. p. 20.
- Cordero, Rosy (December 6, 2020). "'Selena: The Series' creator answers burning questions, teases part 2 is 'rise of Selena the superstar'". Entertainment Weekly.
- Corpus, Lorena (April 1, 2004). "Regresaran Los Dinos para honrar a Selena". El Norte (in Spanish). Gale A114853367 – via Gale Research.
- Colloff, Pamela (April 2010). "Dreaming at of Her". Texas Monthly. Vol. 38, no. 4. Gale A222555398 – via Gale Research.
- Estevez, Marjua (October 17, 2017). "The Top 25 Biggest Selling Latin Albums of the Last 25 Years: Selena, Shakira & More". Billboard. Archived from the original on October 17, 2017.
- Gomez, Adrian (March 27, 2020). "'Absolutely Surreal' Julio Macias 'Incredible Grateful' for Promotion to Regular Role in 'On My Block'". Albuquerque Journal – via Newspapers.com.
- Bumber Gomez (May 29, 2025). "Bumper's Wacky Wednesday 'Joe Ojeda'". YouTube (Podcast).
- Guerra, Joey (May 10, 2021). "Selena keyboardist Joe Ojeda releases debut single 'Dueña De Tu Cama'". Houston Chronicle.
- Hanrahan, Laura (December 4, 2020). "'Selena: The Series': Here's What Selena's Dad, Abraham Quintanilla, Is Up to Now". Cosmopolitan.
- Hernandez, Jeanette (March 24, 2022). "Selena y Los Dinos' Joe Ojeda Releases 'Bombear La Sangre' With Victoria La Mala & Yorch". Remezcla.
- Hinojosa, Cassandra (May 25, 2006). "Jammin' For Jordyn". Corpus Christi Caller-Times – via Newspapers.com.
- Rock n Roll James (February 5, 2025). "Joe Ojeda: His Musical Resurrection". YouTube (Podcast).
- Lannert, John; Bronson, Fred; Mayfield, Geoff (April 15, 1995). "Selena's Tragedy Echoed in Charts". Billboard. Vol. 107, no. 15.
- Maldonado, Vilma (March 31, 1996). "Selena The Legend Lives". The Monitor – via Newspapers.com.
- Medina, John Henry (October 22, 2015). "2015 Tejano Music Awards to stream live on KXTN.com". Tejano Nation.
- Medina, John Henry (October 4, 2024). "Joe Ojeda Returns with New Single 'Maldito Castigo' Featuring Lorena Gomez". Tejano Nation.
- Morales, Ed (August 5, 1999). "Rescurrection". Rolling Stone. ProQuest 220162413.
- Novas, Himilce (1995). Remembering Selena (1st ed.). Sagebrush Education Resources. ISBN 0-613-92637-4.
- Patoski, Joe Nick (1996). Selena: Como La Flor. Little Brown and Company. ISBN 0-316-69378-2.
- Pérez, Chris (2012). To Selena, with Love. Penguin Books. ISBN 978-1-101-58026-4.
- Perez, Isamel (October 5, 2017b). "Tejano Group Celebrates Selena's Music". Victoria Advocate – via Newspapers.com.
- Perez, Angelica (December 7, 2020). "Review: 'Selena: The Series' portrays Selena Quintanilla as a side character in her own story". UWIRE. Gale A644126683.
- Quintanilla, Selena (2002). Selena (Media notes). A.B. Quintanilla (producer), Suzette Quintanilla (spoken liner notes producer). EMI Latin. 724354099403.
- Quintanilla, Selena (1990). Ven Conmigo (Media notes). A.B. Quintanilla (producer), Suzette Quintanilla (spoken liner notes producer). EMI Latin.
- Quintanilla, Selena (2002a). Entre a Mi Mundo (Media notes). A.B. Quintanilla (producer), Suzette Quintanilla (spoken liner notes producer). EMI Latin.
- Edward James Olmos (narrator), Jose Behar (executive producer), Abraham Quintanilla (executive producer), Claribel Cuevas (associate producer), Randal J. Edwards (associate producer), Ila von Hasperg (editor), Jeffrey Coulter (producer), Cecelia Miniucchi (director) (April 1, 1997). Selena Remembered (Documentary). Corpus Christi, Texas: EMI Latin Productions, Q-Productions.
- Riemenschneider, Chris (May 27, 1999). "Rebuilding on a foundation of Rock // Four years after his wife's tragic death, Chris Perez has a new baby and a revolutionary band that's spawning his musical rebirth". Austin American-Statesman. Gale A67147078 – via Gale Research.
- Richmond, Clint (1995). Selena! : The Phenomenal Life and Tragic Death of the Tejano Music Queen (1st ed.). Pocket Books. ISBN 0-671-54522-1.
- Rindner, Grant (December 9, 2020). "Los Bad Boys From Netflix's Selena Was Inspired by This Real Band". Oprah Daily.
- Rivera, Anissa (February 28, 1997). "100 Bucks, A Little Bit of Luck Will Get You Into 'Selena' Party". Corpus Christi Caller-Times – via Newspapers.com.
- Rodriguez, Estella (April 16, 1995). "Friends Remember Selena". Laredo Morning Times. "Pete met Selena in September 1988 when he and another Laredoan, Joe Ojeda, keyboard player with Los Dinos, opened up for her band when they played at Rox-Z's nightclub. Pete and Joe opened up for Selena y Los Dinos for the next two months and in December 1988, they became part of Selena's band."
- Roiz, Jessica (June 1, 2021). "Life After Selena y Los Dinos: Joe Ojeda Kicks Off Solo Career With 'Dueña De Tu Cama'". Billboard.
- Ross, Paige (September 29, 2000). "Top-Quality Acts Abount At Bayfest". Corpus Christi Caller-Times – via Newspapers.com.
- Ross, Paige (November 25, 1999). "Chris Perez At Forefront Of New Musical Era". Corpus Christi Caller-Times – via Newspapers.com.
- Ruiz, Maria (March 15, 2025). "Selena y Los Dinos' Joe Ojeda inspires young Laredo readers". Laredo Morning Times.
- Saldana, Hector (October 15, 2013). "Tejano artists take rock stage". Mysa.
- Salas, Maria (March 31, 2020). "Selena's impact on Laredo remembered 25 years after her death". Laredo Morning Times.
- Soriano, Ashley (May 6, 2021). "Former Selena band member looks back on a legacy". KGNS.TV.
- Stavans, Ilan; Augenbraum, Harold (2005). Encyclopedia Latina: History, Culture, And Society In The United States (4th ed.). Grolier Academic Reference. ISBN 0-7172-5815-7.
- Valdes-Rodriguez, Alisa (April 9, 1999a). "The Resonance of Selena; Pop Music: Four years after the tejano singer's murder, her shattered family is still coping with its grief as it tries to carry on her legacy". Los Angeles Times. ProQuest 421378557.
- Valdes-Rodriguez, Alisa (May 9, 1999b). "He's Fine. Trust Us". The Los Angeles Times – via Newspapers.com.
- Valdes-Rodriguez, Alisa (May 23, 1999). "Selena's Widower Turns To Rock, His Musical Love". Fresno Bee. Gale A68255500 – via Gale Research.
- Verhovek, Sam Howe (April 1, 1995). "Grammy-Winning Singer Selena Killed in Shooting at Texas Motel". The New York Times. p. 1. Archived from the original on July 20, 2016.
- Villa, Lucas (May 12, 2021). "Exclusive: Joe Ojeda Talks New Single "Dueña De Tu Cama," Selena Memories And Los Dinos' Legacy". Mitu.com.
