= Besitos =

Song by Selena

from the album Selena
- Recorded: 1989
- Studio: AMEN Studios
- Genre: Tejano cumbia
- Length: 2:22
- Label: EMI Latin
- Songwriters: A. B. Quintanilla; Pete Astudillo
- Producer: A. B. Quintanilla

Audio video
- "Besitos" on YouTube

"Besitos" ("Little Kisses") is a song recorded by American singer Selena on her eponymous debut album with EMI Latin. It was composed by A. B. Quintanilla and Pete Astudillo. Upon signing a recording contract with EMI Latin, A. B. was cautioned that failure to produce a successful album would result in his replacement by a company-approved candidate. The group Los Bad Boyz, composed of Astudillo and keyboardist Joe Ojeda, initially opened for Selena y Los Dinos before integrating themselves into the band's lineup. Astudillo's songwriting debut came in the form of "Besitos", a composition in which the lyrics convey a longing for the protagonist's lover's kisses and a desire to be their source of happiness.

Critics praised the song for serving as a template for the group's incorporation of cumbia music into their sound in subsequent recordings. The two-part limited drama Selena: The Series (2020–21), distributed on Netflix, depicts the creation of "Besitos" with Christian Serratos portraying Selena opposite Gabriel Chavarria as A. B. Following the show's release, "Besitos" ascended to number 19 on the United States Billboard Latin Digital Song Sales chart. Mexican singer Mary Boquitas recorded a rendition of the song for the all-star tribute album Mexico Recuerda a Selena (2005).

== Background and production ==
Following the early 1980s recession in the United States, former musician Abraham Quintanilla, sought to promote his children's band Selena y Los Dinos as a way to make ends meet after being evicted from their home in 1981. During the 1989 Tejano Music Awards, Rick Trevino invited the lead vocalist, Selena, to be the opening act for the awards ceremony after La Sombra declined the offer. Representatives from CBS Records and newly formed EMI Latin attended the awards event to scout for new musical talent. EMI Latin's proposal appealed to Abraham due to the potential for a crossover, and he intended for his children to be the premier musicians to sign with the company. EMI Latin hesitated to let A. B. Quintanilla maintain his role as the group's producer. However, given the uncertainty of the genre's future, the company acquiesced, allowing A. B. to stay on as producer but cautioning that failure would result in his replacement by a company-approved candidate.

In September 1988, Los Bad Boyz, consisting of vocalist Pete Astudillo and keyboardist Joe Ojeda, opened for Selena y Los Dinos at Rox-Z's nightclub in Laredo, Texas. Following their initial meeting, Astudillo conceived the concept and lyrics for the song "Besitos" on the same night of their performance. Selena y Los Dinos subsequently invited Los Bad Boyz to continue to open for them at their concerts for the next two months. Astudillo and Ojeda joined their group that December. Astudillo's addition to the group involved harmonizing with Selena and performing duets while Ojeda joined as the second keyboardist. "Besitos" was the first instance in which Astudillo provided production and songwriting assistance. In a later interview, keyboardist Ricky Vela discussed how he and Astudillo worked together to elaborate on the arrangements in their music production. Astudillo's input on songwriting initially occurred with "Besitos", which he co-wrote with A. B. who regarded as a turning point for the band as it steered them towards exploring the cumbia genre in future releases.

== Music, lyrics, and reception ==
"Besitos" (1989)
According to music critics, the cumbia sounds explored in "Besitos" would later influence Selena's distinctive sound in subsequent releases.

The song "Besitos", a two-minute and 22-second recording, features lyrics in which Selena recounts how each kiss from her beloved intensifies her affection and forms indelible memories. She expresses a yearning for her partner's kisses day and night, seeking reassurance that she is the source of his joy and has won his heart. With its up-tempo chorus and primarily cumbia style, "Besitos" has been called as Selena's "strongest early cumbias." According to scholars Gaetano Prampolini and Annamaria Pinazzi, Selena's cumbias evoke a distinct register of emotion and encompass a broader range of meanings than Celso Pina's. They describe Selena's "Besitos" as a "kissing pleasure" cumbia.

"Besitos" served as a defining moment for Selena y Los Dinos, as it marked their distinctive cumbia sound. Prior to that, the band had undergone extensive experimentation, traversing a range of musical genres, including freestyle, techno, Tejano, and ranchera, in an effort to identify their signature sound. "Besitos" marked a pivotal shift in the band's musical trajectory, providing a transformative impetus that allowed them to craft some of their most popular cumbia recordings. This was echoed by Armando Barraza in La Prensa, who concurred with the notion that A. B. and Astudillo had played a significant role in molding the cumbia sound that would come to characterize Selena's future recordings. The song played a crucial role in Selena's artistic development and ultimately influenced the fusion of sounds and rhythms that came to define her signature style. In a survey conducted by Norteña Musical in December 1992, "Besitos" was the seventh most-played song on radio stations in the towns of Allende and Zaragoza in Coahuila, Mexico. "Besitos" was among the songs Selena performed on Veronica Castro's Y Vero América ¡Va! in December 1992, which was shown throughout Latin America through Televisa. Writing for Vogue México y Latinoamérica, Esteban Villaseñor felt that Selena displayed "charisma, brilliance and talent" during her appearance on Castro's show. Mexican singer Mary Boquitas recorded a rendition of "Besitos" for the all-star tribute album Mexico Recuerda a Selena (2005). However, Luz Pena of The Fresno Bee, regarded Boquitas' version of "Besitos" as one of the album's lowlights after observing her erratic delivery, marked by abrupt pauses in the middle of verses.

The Netflix's two-part limited drama Selena: The Series (2020–21), portrayed the creation of "Besitos", with Christian Serratos depicting Selena opposite Gabriel Chavarria as A. B. In the sixth episode of the first part of the series, A. B. was facing intense pressure from the record label to produce a commercially successful album, threatening his position as the band's producer. When Selena failed to show up for a recording session, A. B. became upset and confronted her about it. Selena explained that she had been working tirelessly to develop the band's aesthetic for the album, hoping that it would attract attention from prospective buyers. This led to a disagreement between the two regarding their respective priorities. Selena made amends by reassuring A. B. that she would quickly record "Besitos" to make time to visit a fabric store before it closed. She achieved this by rapidly singing the song from its original downtempo version. A. B. appreciated this new approach and instructed keyboardist Vela (Hunter Reese Peña) to develop a faster tempo inspired by Selena's interpretation of the song. In an interview with Chic, Serratos admitted to being unaware of the song "Besitos". Nonetheless, following the completion of filming, she informed Mural that "Besitos" had rapidly become one of her favorite Selena songs. Serratos expressed eagerness for viewers to experience the performances of both "Besitos" and "¿Qué Creías?" (1992) on the show. Following the release of the show, "Besitos" entered the US Billboard Latin Digital Song Sales chart at number 19, on the tracking week of December 16, 2020, where it stayed for one week.

== Credits and personnel ==
Credits are adapted from the liner notes of Selena.

- Selena – lead vocals
- Pete Astudillo – composer, background vocals
- Manny Guerra – producer, engineer, mix engineer
- A. B. Quintanilla – composer, producer, arranger, mixing
- Ricky Vela – keyboards
- Jesse Ibarra – electric guitar
- Suzette Quintanilla – drums

== Chart performance ==
Weekly chart performance for "Besitos"
Chart (2020)	Peak position
US Latin Digital Song Sales (Billboard)	19

== Works cited ==
- "Selena". Latin Style (45–51). 2002.
- Prampolini, Gaetano; Pinazzi, Annamaria (2013). Shade of the saguaro : essays on the literary cultures of the American Southwest = La sombra del saguaro : ensayos sobre las culturas literarias del suroeste norteamericano. Firenze University Press. ISBN 9788866553939.
- "Recuerda Mexico a Selena Con Tributo". Arizona Daily Star (in Spanish). March 23, 2005 – via Newspapers.com.
- "Veronica Castro Selena Quintanilla y el Inolvidable Momento Que vivieron juntas en television" (in Spanish). November 11, 2022.
- Arce, Arturo Magaña (April 12, 2020). "Selena: La serie – La leyenda musical renace en la televisión". Cinepremiere.mx.
- Burr, Ramiro (February 23, 1993). "Selena Poised for Pop Success". Austin American-Statesman – via Newspapers.com.
- Barraza, Armando (March 30, 2008). "Selena Inolvidable". La Prensa. ProQuest 368670024.
- Garcia, Juan Carlos (May 6, 2021). "Lo que Christian Serratos gozó y sufrió como Selena". Grupo Reforma (in Spanish).
- Garza, Aracely (November 27, 2020). "Christian Serratos y los retos de interpretar a Selena Quintanilla". Chic (in Spanish).
- Guerra, Joey (March 27, 2005). "Her complete works / Collective recordings of Selena span a number of genres". Houston Chronicle. ProQuest 396118842.
- Guerra, Joey (August 28, 2022). "11 Selena Deep Cuts You Should Be Listening To". Corpus Christi Caller-Times – via Newspapers.com.
- Patoski, Joe Nick (1996). Selena: Como La Flor. Boston: Little Brown and Company. ISBN 0-316-69378-2.
- Pena, Luz (May 4, 2005). "Selena's Tribute CD Falls Short". The Fresno Bee – via Newspapers.com.
- Rodriguez, Estella (April 16, 1995). "Friends Remember Selena". Laredo Morning Times. "Pete met Selena in September 1988 when he and another Laredoan, Joe Ojeda, keyboard player with Los Dinos, opened up for her band when they played at Rox-Z's nightclub. Pete and Joe opened up for Selena y Los Dinos for the next two months and in December 1988, they became part of Selena's band."
- Hewitt, Bill; Harmes, Joseph; Stewart, Bob (April 17, 1995). "Before Her Time". People Weekly. 43 (15): 138.
- San-Juan, Rocio (December 1992). "Selena y Los Dinos: La Revelacion del '92". Norteña Musical (23).
- Soriano, Ashley (May 5, 2021). "Former Selena band member looks back on a legacy". KGNS-TV.
- Quintanilla, Selena (2002). Selena. EMI Latin (Media notes). A. B. Quintanilla (producer), Suzette Quintanilla (spoken liner notes producer). 724354099403.
- Huston-Crespo, Marysabel E. (March 31, 2022). "¿Cuál es la magia de Selena Quintanilla? El legado de la cantante tejana sigue intacto a más de un cuarto de siglo de su muerte". CNN en Español (in Spanish). Gale A698927110 – via Gale Research.
- Bustios, Pamela (December 16, 2020). "Selena Returns to Latin Pop Albums Chart With 'Selena: The Series Soundtrack'". Billboard.
- Serna, Aaron (December 4, 2020). "My Love". Selena: The Series. Season 1. Episode 6. 30 minutes in. Netflix.
- Edward James Olmos (narrator), Jose Behar (executive producer), Abraham Quintanilla (executive producer), Claribel Cuevas (associate producer), Randal J. Edwards (associate producer), Ila von Hasperg (editor), Jeffrey Coulter (producer), Cecelia Miniucchi (director) (April 1, 1997). Selena Remembered (Documentary). Corpus Christi, Texas: EMI Latin Productions, Q-Productions.
- Villaseñor, Esteban (May 4, 2021). "La historia de una memorable entrevista de Selena Quintanilla en México". Vogue México y Latinoamérica (in Spanish).
