= Selena (album) =

Studio album by Selena
- Released: October 17, 1989
- Recorded: 1988–89
- Studio: AMEN (San Antonio, Texas)
- Genre: Tejano; Latin pop
- Length: 28:59
- Language: Spanish; English
- Label: EMI Latin
- Producer: A.B. Quintanilla III

Selena chronology
| Dulce Amor (1988) | Selena (1989) | 16 Super Éxitos Originales (1990) |

Singles from Selena
- 1. "Contigo Quiero Estar" Released: February 1989; 2. "Mentiras" Released: 1989; 3. "Sukiyaki" Released: 1990

Selena is the debut studio album by American Tejano singer Selena, released on October 17, 1989, by Capitol/EMI Latin. Its music incorporates a range of contemporary genres with a mix of cumbia and regional styles of Mexican music. The album was released following company president Jose Behar's failed crossover request for the singer. The project was denied by the heads of EMI Records' pop division, believing the singer should first strengthen her fanbase. Selena's brother and principal record producer and songwriter, A.B. Quintanilla fought to remain the singer's producer. The band introduced Pete Astudillo and Joe Ojeda, who contributed to the album's experimental production and songwriting. Aside from A.B., Selena worked with two Mexican songwriters, Alejandro Montealegre and Reinaldo Ornelas.

Because Selena was the singer's first work on a major label, the album was expected to draw and lure large audiences to Selena. The goal of the album was to be introductory into the international Latin music market, with future sights into an English-language crossover. Selena peaked at number seven on the US Billboard Regional Mexican Albums, Selena's first entry in a national music chart. Selena performed better than other recordings from other contemporaneous female Tejano singers. The recording led Selena to win Female Vocalist of the Year and Female Entertainer of the Year at the 1990 Tejano Music Awards. Songs from the album, "Contigo Quiero Estar" was nominated for Song of the Year, while "Amame, Quiereme" was nominated for Vocal Duo of the Year.

Selena increased the singer's popularity; she became a sex icon after the album's release. Critics called the recording a moderate success that eventually "opened the doors" for the group. Beginning with Selena, the singer and her band began experimenting with various genres that led to the introduction of cumbia music. The genre was heavily used in subsequent releases, which became her trademark. The album spawned three singles, "Contigo Quiero Estar", "Mentiras", and a Spanish-language version of a Japanese song called "Sukiyaki".

In April 2025, the Recording Industry Association of America (RIAA) certified the album gold, denoting 30,000 album-equivalent units sold in the United States.

== Background and production ==
After starting a band with his children, Abraham Quintanilla, Jr. became the group's manager and began promoting it. The group recorded an album with Freddie Records in 1984, though it was never released. Abraham provided two demos to Charlie Grever, father of Bob Grever owner of Cara Records, who signed then-thirteen year old Selena to the recording label. Manny Guerra, who separated from Cara Records, started his own record label. Guerra wanted to sign Selena to his recording label in 1985. Guerra dissolved the agreement between Cara Records and Selena when it was brought to his attention. Selena recorded five LP records for Manny's GP Productions by 1988, without a contract. Abraham expressed in an interview how he forgot to sign it, and noticed how Guerra stopped asking him about the contract after Selena became more popular. At the 1989 Tejano Music Awards, Selena was approached by Rick Trevino to be the opening act after La Sombra declined the offer. Jose Behar of newly formed Capitol/EMI Latin and the heads of Sony Music attended the awards ceremony and were scouting for new acts. Behar wanted to sign Selena to his label, while Sony Music was offering twice EMI's offer. Behar believed he had discovered "the next Gloria Estefan", which his superior called him illogical since he had only been in Texas for a week. Abraham chose Capitol/EMI Latin's offer because of the potential for a crossover, and he wanted his children to be the first musicians to sign with the company. Before Selena began recording her debut album, Behar and Stephen Finfer requested a crossover album for her. The singer recorded three English-language songs for the heads of EMI's pop division. Behar and Finfer's request for a crossover album was denied and Selena was told she needed a bigger fan base to sell such an album. Behar thought EMI Records and the public did not believe that a Mexican-American woman could have "crossover potential" after Charles Koppelman denied the project. The company believed Selena had potential in Mexico and South American markets when they signed the singer in 1989.

Initially, Capitol/EMI Latin wanted a Grammy Award-winning producer to work with Selena on her album. Her brother and bass guitarist, A.B. Quintanilla became the singer's principal record producer and songwriter prior to signing with Capitol/EMI Latin in 1989. Capitol/EMI Latin felt that they were "gambling" when they opened a Latin division. Abraham went into an agreement that if A.B. failed to produce a successful album, then they would approve of a Grammy Award producer for her next recording. Under pressure, A.B. expressed how the band "couldn't take a failure" and worried that if they did, the band would be "at the bottom of the totem pole". The production of the album began on June 4, 1989, Selena expressed her excitement about the album; in an interview, she said: "I am really happy, all the hard work paid off." The goal of Selena was to be an introductory into the international Latin music market, with future sights into an English-language crossover. The band became "a bit more trendier and a little bit cutting-edge" on Selena with experimental production and songwriting. It was the first album with any production and songwriting assistance from Pete Astudillo and Joe Ojeda; Astudillo was brought in to harmonize and sing duets with Selena, while Ojeda acted as a second keyboardist. Ojeda bought a Roland D-50 synthesizer; at the time of one of the most popular keyboards, which contributed to the overall "flashy" sounds in the album. Keyboardist, Ricky Vela said in an interview how he and Astudillo began elaborating the arrangements in their music production.

== Recording and composition ==
"Sukiyaki" (1989)
"Sukiyaki" was a 1960s Japanese pop song translated into Spanish from an English-language version written by Janice Marie Johnson.

Selena was recorded in its entirety, with the exception of "Sukiyaki" and "My Love", at Manny Guerra's AMEN Studios in San Antonio, Texas and was engineered by house engineer Brian "Red" Moore. "Sukiyaki" and "My Love" were recorded at Sunrise Studios in Houston, Texas. Selena wanted the album to concentrate on Tejano music and Latin pop. A.B. found the genres in Selena to be pop and R&B. Selena incorporates a range of contemporary genres with a mix of cumbia and regional styles of Mexican music. Boleros and polka music were other genres explored on Selena. Astudillo had written a concept and gave it to A.B. after the band's concert in Laredo, Texas. The resulting song was called "Besitos", it was the first recording A.B. and Astudillo collaborated, and the first song Astudillo wrote for the group. A.B. found "Besitos" as the "pivotal point [in Selena's career]" because of the introduction of cumbia music, a genre the band used heavily in subsequent releases. "Besitos" became a platform for the group in producing more cumbia-flavored tracks in Selena's second studio release, Ven Conmigo (1990).

Abraham suggested the idea of writing "Sukiyaki"—a 1960s Japanese song by Kyu Sakamoto—into a Spanish-language song. He expressed his interest after an English-language version by A Taste of Honey was released. Abraham worked with Astudillo to write the recording. The lyrics used were a Spanish version of an English version of the song by Janice Marie Johnson. Vela confirmed that he was supposed to help with the writing process of "Sukiyaki" but did not contribute. Vela expressed how Astudillo's songwriting skills and Spanish were more advanced and overall preferred Astudillo in writing "Sukiyaki". Joe Nick Patoski wrote in Texas Monthly that "Sukiyaki" is a "sentimental" track.

Astudillo was due to record backing vocals on "Amame, Quiereme", his first recording sessions in a studio, Suzette noticed how nervous he was at recording. He was removed from the recording studio after an unsuccessful session, he expressed his disappointment at not meeting the desired range in an interview. After his friend successfully recorded the track, Astudillo retried and met the required demands. Astudillo said how his aspirations of recording in a studio inspired him to not give up. Selena wrote "My Love", an English-language track that A.B. believed echoed works by Exposé and Sweet Sensation. He helped with the arrangements along with Astudillo. It was Selena's first attempt at songwriting. Biographer Joe Nick Patoski, believed "My Love" was paean to Madonna. Vela was chosen to record the accordion on "Mentiras", though he expressed how his instrument was not up to par and had faulty sounds that sounded "un-accordion". The group decided to hire professional studio accordions after Vela's "cringy" sounding instrument was brought to the band's attention. A.B. desperately needed more materials to record for Selena, Vela wrote some parts for a song called "Tengo Ganas de Llorar". In retrospect, Vela said how his part was not satisfactory even though A.B. liked it, for which Vela said he was "just being polite, so he let it pass because we needed another song". Though A.B. remained the singer's principle record producer and songwriter, he did not compose "Sukiyaki" (Abraham/Astudillo), "Contigo Quiero Estar" (Alejandro Montealegre), and "No Te Vayas" (Reinaldo Ornelas).

== Critical reception ==
Professional ratings
Review scores
| Source | Rating |
|---|---|
| AllMusic | 3/5 stars |

Selena was initially scheduled for a summer 1989 release, but was pushed back to October 17, 1989. Unimpressed with the image Guerra presented, creative director Rubén Cubillos decided to express an image of "natural beauty" for Selena on this album's cover. The singer chose an outfit that her mother believed would upset her conservative father, and Cubillos had to distract Selena from looking at Abraham Quintanilla throughout the photoshoot. Selena's father was visibly uncomfortable with her clothing and makeup. Abraham came in and out during the shoot and complained to Cubillos that Selena loathed her makeup during their conversations. Capitol/EMI Latin detested the album cover and called it "the worst they'd ever gotten." Cubillos believed the company "didn't understand it" and said he liked the cover because of "the warmth of her skin." He claimed in retrospect that he regretted Selena's makeup and wished he had washed it off because "she's not a model, she's not anything but a nice, fresh young woman with talent." Patoski argued that the cover unveiled a tall and sultry Selena, but expressionless, as if her mind was wandering. He noted that the band and Abraham Quintanilla were also unimpressed with the cover. Abraham later complained to Ramon Hernandez about Selena's nose "looking too flat."

Selena's popularity increased following the album's success and her provocative image made her a musical sex icon. According to Latin Style magazine, the tracks "Sukiyaki", "Contigo Quiero Estar", and "Besitos", were "pivotal" recordings that showcased Selena's "mixed rhythm and sound" which the magazine attributed to being her "trademark". At the 1990 Tejano Music Awards, Selena won Female Vocalist of the Year and Female Entertainer of the Year. A.B. was nominated for Songwriter of the Year. Songs from the album, "Contigo Quiero Estar" were nominated for Song of the Year, and "Amame, Quiereme" was nominated for Vocal Duo of the Year.

== Commercial performance ==
Because the album was released on a major record label, Selena expected presentation to a larger, global audience. Capitol/EMI Latin's marketing team "worked the radio stations as no independent producer had before" to deliver Selena "more chart action than she'd ever enjoyed." An April 1989 survey found "Contigo Quiero Estar" as the most-played song on Tejano radio stations in the Corpus Christi area for two weeks. The album debuted at number 17 on the US Billboard Regional Mexican Albums chart for the week ending December 2, 1989. It was the highest debut for an album that week, beating out La Fiebre's On the Right, and was Selena's first album to chart on a national music chart. It promptly slipped off the charts the following week but returned to number 15 after the holiday season. Selena rose to number 12 for the week ending January 27, 1990. The album peaked at number seven in its seventh week on March 24, 1990. It was Selena's highest peaking album, until Ven Conmigo surpassed it a year later. During the twenty-year celebration of Selena-released music, Selena was repackaged and re-made available for physical and digital purchase on September 22, 2002. This limited-edition version included Selena's top 20 single "La Bamba" from (1987), as well as spoken liner notes with commentary and recollections of each track provided by the singer's family, friends, and band.

The album performed better than other recordings from other contemporary female Tejano singers. Selena became the "dominant female vocalist in a predominately-male industry." The album's tour sent Selena to Arizona, New Mexico, Indiana, Illinois, Washington state, and Florida, areas where she had not been in prior demand. Selena was responsible "for bringing a certain charm, innovative spirit, and new perspective [to Tejano music]." Other critics attested that it was a "door-opener" for the group in the Tejano market. This was echoed by Billboard magazine, who believed Selena's recordings were not successful until she signed with Capitol/EMI Latin and released Selena in 1989. Author Lee Stacy wrote that Selena "achieved reasonable success."

== Track listing ==
| No. | Title | Writer(s) | Length |
|---|---|---|---|
| 1. | "Tú Eres" | A.B. Quintanilla III; Pete Astudillo | 3:04 |
| 2. | "Sukiyaki" | Rokusuke Ei; Hachidai Nakamura; Janice-Marie Johnson; Abraham Quintanilla Jr.; Astudillo | 3:12 |
| 3. | "Contigo Quiero Estar" | Alejandro Montealegre | 3:13 |
| 4. | "Besitos" | Quintanilla III | 3:00 |
| 5. | "Amame, Quiéreme" | Quintanilla III | 3:42 |
| 6. | "Tengo Ganas De Llorar" | Quintanilla III; Ricky Vela | 3:32 |
| 7. | "My Love" | Selena | 3:16 |
| 8. | "Quiero Ser" | Quintanilla III; Astudillo | 2:34 |
| 9. | "Mentiras" | Quintanilla III; Astudillo | 2:54 |
| 10. | "No Te Vayas" | Reinaldo Ornelas | 2:23 |

2002 re-release bonus tracks
| No. | Title | Writer(s) | Length |
|---|---|---|---|
| 11. | "La Bamba" (Anthology remix; originally from And the Winner Is..., 1987) | Traditional | 3:54 |
| 12. | "Spoken Liner Notes: Intro" | | 2:53 |
| 13. | "Spoken Liner Notes: Sukiyaki" | | 1:27 |
| 14. | "Spoken Liner Notes: Contigo Quiero Estar" | | 0:35 |
| 15. | "Spoken Liner Notes: Besitos" | | 1:22 |
| 16. | "Spoken Liner Notes: Amame, Quiereme" | | 2:05 |
| 17. | "Spoken Liner Notes: Tengo Ganas De Llorar" | | 0:25 |
| 18. | "Spoken Liner Notes: My Love" | | 0:41 |
| 19. | "Spoken Liner Notes: Mentiras" | | 0:36 |
| 20. | "Spoken Liner Notes: No Te Vayas" | | 0:27 |
| 21. | "Spoken Liner Notes: Outro" | | 0:22 |

== Personnel ==
Credits are taken from the album's liner notes.

- Selena – vocals
- Pete Astudillo – backing vocals
- Ricky Vela – keyboards, composer
- Jose "Joe" C. Ojeda – keyboards
- Suzette Quintanilla – drums
- Roger Garcia – guitars
- A.B. Quintanilla – bass guitar, backing vocals, producer, composer, arranger
- Abraham Quintanilla Jr. – executive producer, composer
- Manny Guerra – recording engineer
- Brian "Red" Moore – audio mixer, co-engineer

2012 re-issue

- Jorge A. Pino L. – executive producer
- Guillhermo J. Page – producer
- Suzette Quintanilla – liner notes producer
- Lisette Lorenzo – art direction
- Brian "Red" Moore – liner notes recorder

== Charts ==
=== Weekly charts ===
| Chart (1989) | Peak position |
|---|---|
| US Regional Mexican Albums (Billboard) | 7 |

=== Year-end charts ===
| Chart (1990) | Peak position |
|---|---|
| US Regional Mexican Albums (Billboard) | 19 |

== Certifications and sales ==
| Region | Certification | Certified units/sales |
|---|---|---|
| United States (RIAA) | Gold (Latin) | 30,000^{‡} |
^{‡} Sales+streaming figures based on certification alone.

== See also ==
- Selena albums discography
- Latin American music in the United States

== Bibliography ==
- "Regional Mexican Albums > December 2, 1989". Billboard. Vol. 96, no. 45. Prometheus Global Media. December 2, 1989.
- "Hispanic Musician Climbing the Charts". The Tyler Courier-Time. April 6, 1989. p. 13.
- "Regional Mexican Albums > January 13, 1990". Billboard. Vol. 97, no. 2. January 13, 1990.
- "Regional Mexican Albums > January 27, 1990". Billboard. Vol. 97, no. 4. January 27, 1990.
- "Regional Mexican Albums > March 24, 1990". Billboard. Vol. 97, no. 12. March 24, 1990.
- "1990 in Music". Billboard. Vol. 97, no. 52. December 22, 1990. p. YE-50.
- "Selena". Latin Style (45). 2002. "The song "My Love," was written by Selena and samples from contemporary pop influences. Other songs like "Sukiyaki" (a cover of Kyu Sakamoto's 1963 hit), "Amame, Quiéreme" (her first duet with Pete Astudillo), and the cumbia "Besitos", played a pivotal role on how Selena mixed rhythm and sound, which became her trademark."
- Anon. (November 26, 2008). "Selena: Biography". Biography. 60 minutes in. A&E.
- Lopetegui, Enrique (April 8, 1995). "A Crossover Dream Halted Prematurely, Tragically Some Ambitious Plans Were Under Way to Bring Selena to Mainstream U.S. Audience". Los Angeles Times. Archived from the original on November 7, 2012.
- Minnick, Doug (September 24, 2010). "Jose Behar, interview". Taxi A&R. Archived from the original on January 30, 2015.
- Howe Verhovek, Sam (April 1, 1995). "Grammy Winning Singer Selena Killed in Shooting at Texas Motel". The New York Times. p. 1.
- Burr, Ramiro (February 12, 1995). "Selena takes 6 honors to dominate Tejano Music Awards". San Antonio Express-News. Archived from the original on October 25, 2012.
- Adolfo, Flores (December 9, 1990). "Tejano Music Celebrates in Awards Show". Del Rio News Herald – via Newspapers.com.
- "Tejano Music Past Award Winners". Texas Talent Association. Archived from the original on September 30, 2000.
- Erlewine, Stephen Thomas. "Selena > Album Review". Allmusic.
- Erlewine, Stephen Thomas. "Selena > List of releases". Allmusic.
- Pérez, Chris (2012). To Selena, with Love. Penguin Books. ISBN 978-1-101-58026-4.
- Ramirez, Rauly (March 31, 2015). "Celebrating Selena on her 20th anniversary". Billboard. Archived from the original on April 8, 2018.
- Rivas, Robert. "Abraham Quintanilla, Jr. Interview". YouTube.
- Peña, Manuel (2002). Música Tejana. Texas A&M University. ISBN 978-0-89096-888-8.
- Lannert, John (April 5, 1997). "Notas". Billboard. Vol. 109, no. 14.
- Stacy, Lee (2002). Mexico and the United States. New York: Marshall Cavendish. ISBN 0-7614-7402-1.
- Caicedo, Harry (June 4, 1989). "First Album in the Works". The Monitor – via Newspapers.com.
- Morales, Ed (2003). The Latin Beat (1st ed.). Cambridge, MA: Da Capo Press. ISBN 0-306-81018-2.
- Maldonado, Vilma (April 24, 1989). "Selena". The Monitor – via Newspapers.com.
- Mitchell, Rick (May 21, 1995). "Selena". Houston Chronicle. Archived from the original on July 9, 2007.
- Gershman, Rick (March 18, 1997). "Selena's legacy". St. Petersburg Times. Times Publishing Company.
- Clark, Michael (March 25, 2005). "Ten years after her murder, Selena lives on". Corpus Christi Caller-Times.
- Quintanilla, Selena (1989). Selena (Media notes). A.B. Quintanilla (producer), Suzette Quintanilla (spoken liner notes producer). EMI Latin. 724354099403.
- Patoski, Joe Nick (2010). Texas Monthly on Texas Women. University of Texas Press. ISBN 978-0-292-77360-8.
- Joseph, Harriet Denise (2018). From Santa Anna to Selena: Notable Mexicanos and Tejanos in Texas History since 1821. University of North Texas Press. ISBN 978-1574417234.
- Patoski, Joe Nick (1996). Selena: Como La Flor. Boston: Little Brown and Company. ISBN 0-316-69378-2.
