= Zapata Times =

Local newspaper

Zapata Times
- Type: Weekly newspaper
- Format: Broadsheet
- Owner(s): Laredo Morning Times; Hearst Corporation
- Publisher: William B. Green
- Founded: August 16, 2008
- Headquarters: Laredo, Webb County, Texas, USA
- Website: thezapatatimes.com

The Zapata Times is a weekly newspaper publication in Zapata, Texas, USA. It is produced by the Laredo Morning Times which is owned by the Hearst Corporation. The Zapata Times was first published on August 16, 2008 and is delivered every Saturday to 4,000 homes in Zapata County free of charge.
