= The Daily Journal (New Jersey) =

New Jersey newspaper

Coordinates: 39.499573°N 75.008374°W

- Type: Daily newspaper
- Owner: USA Today Co.
- Founded: June 7, 1875; 151 years ago
- Headquarters: 891 East Oak Road; Vineland, New Jersey 08360
- City: Vineland, New Jersey
- Country: United States
- Circulation: 1,113 (as of 2024)
- OCLC number: 11378844
- Website: thedailyjournal.com

The Daily Journal is a newspaper printed in Vineland, New Jersey, from Monday to Saturday. It is distributed throughout most of Cumberland County in Southern New Jersey. Its main competitors are The Philadelphia Inquirer, the Courier Post and The Press of Atlantic City. The main focus is on communities in and around Vineland and Millville.

== History ==
The first daily paper published in Vineland, New Jersey, The Daily Journal was established on June 7, 1875, by W.E. Cansdell, 14 years after Vineland's founding. A part of local history almost from the beginning, the original paper consisted of four pages with a yearly subscription rate of $2.

During the same year of The Daily Journal's birth, the death of an editor at another local paper, The Vineland Independent, made headlines all over the northeast.

Max Leuchter and his wife, Cecelia Bass Leuchter founded The Vineland Times and merged it with The Vineland Journal in 1942. The Leuchter family sold the paper to The Evening News Association in Detroit in 1973. The Millville Daily was acquired at the same time. Gannett bought The Evening News Association in 1985.

The Daily Journal took its current name in 1988 with the merger of the Millville Daily into Vineland Times-Journal.

== Prices ==
The Journal's price is $0.75 Monday through Saturday.
