= José Behar =

Mexican-American movie producer

- Born: José Behar; Havana, Cuba
- Occupation: Music Executive
- Known for: Signing Selena

José Behar is a Cuban-American music executive known for his work in the Latin music industry. He has held leadership roles at EMI Latin and Univision Music Group. In the late 1980s, Behar was appointed to head EMI’s newly created Latin division, where he played a role in signing several Latin artists, including Selena Quintanilla. His involvement with Selena contributed to her rise as a significant figure in Latin music. In 2001, Behar became part of the Univision Music Group, continuing his work in promoting Latin artists and helping to expand the genre’s presence in the mainstream music market.

He watched Selena perform at the 1989 Tejano Music Awards. Behar was searching for new Latin acts and wanted to sign Selena to EMI's label. Behar thought he had discovered the "next Gloria Estefan." Selena chose EMI Latin's offer because of the potential for a crossover album, and becoming the first artist to sign to the label. Before Selena began recording for her debut album, Selena, Behar and Stephen Finfer requested a crossover album for her. In 1995, Selena was murdered. In July 1995, Selena's 'Dreaming of You' Album premiered in No. 1 Spot.
