= Stephen Finfer =

US musical businessman

Stephen Finfer is an American entertainment attorney and music industry executive. He has worked in music publishing, artist management, and music catalog transactions, and is associated with ArtHouse Entertainment.

== Career ==
In the 1990s, Finfer worked as an entertainment attorney in the recording industry. In 1995, the Los Angeles Times described Finfer as the attorney who negotiated Selena’s 1989 recording agreement with EMI Latin Records and her subsequent English-language contract with EMI’s SBK Records.

In 2001, while serving as general manager of TVT Music Publishing, Finfer signed songwriter and producer Scott Storch to an exclusive worldwide publishing agreement, as reported by HITS magazine.

Finfer later became associated with ArtHouse Entertainment, a music publishing and management company co-founded with songwriter Kara DioGuardi. In a 2005 profile, the Los Angeles Times identified Finfer as DioGuardi’s manager and business partner in ArtHouse Entertainment Group.

In 2012, Reuters reported that Round Hill Music acquired a 150-song catalog from ArtHouse Entertainment that included works recorded by artists such as Bruno Mars and CeeLo Green.

In 2020, Music Business Worldwide quoted Finfer regarding Spirit Music Group’s acquisition of a substantial portion of DioGuardi’s music publishing catalog.

In 2023, Music Business Worldwide reported that Seeker Music acquired a share of Jon Bellion’s publishing catalog that had been held by ArtHouse Entertainment.

ArtHouse Entertainment’s publishing catalog has included commercially successful recordings such as GAYLE’s 2021 single “abcdefu.”

== Television ==
In 2011, BroadwayWorld reported that DioGuardi and Finfer served as executive producers through ArtHouse Entertainment on the Bravo docu-series Kara.
