= El Debate (Mexico) =

Mexican newspaper

El Debate de Culiacán is a Mexican newspaper published by El Debate S.A. de C.V. of Culiacán, Sinaloa.

Fernando Brito, a photographic editor of El Debate, gave a speech at the "Crónicas: Seven Contemporary Mexican Artists Confront the Drug War" exhibit in Houston, Texas.
