= Laredo Morning Times =

Newspaper in Laredo, Texas

- Type: Daily newspaper
- Format: Broadsheet
- Owner(s): Hearst Communications
- Publisher: William B. Green
- Editor: Zach Davis
- Founded: June 14, 1892
- Headquarters: Laredo, Webb County, Texas, USA
- Circulation: 5,034 (as of 2023)
- Website: www.lmtonline.com

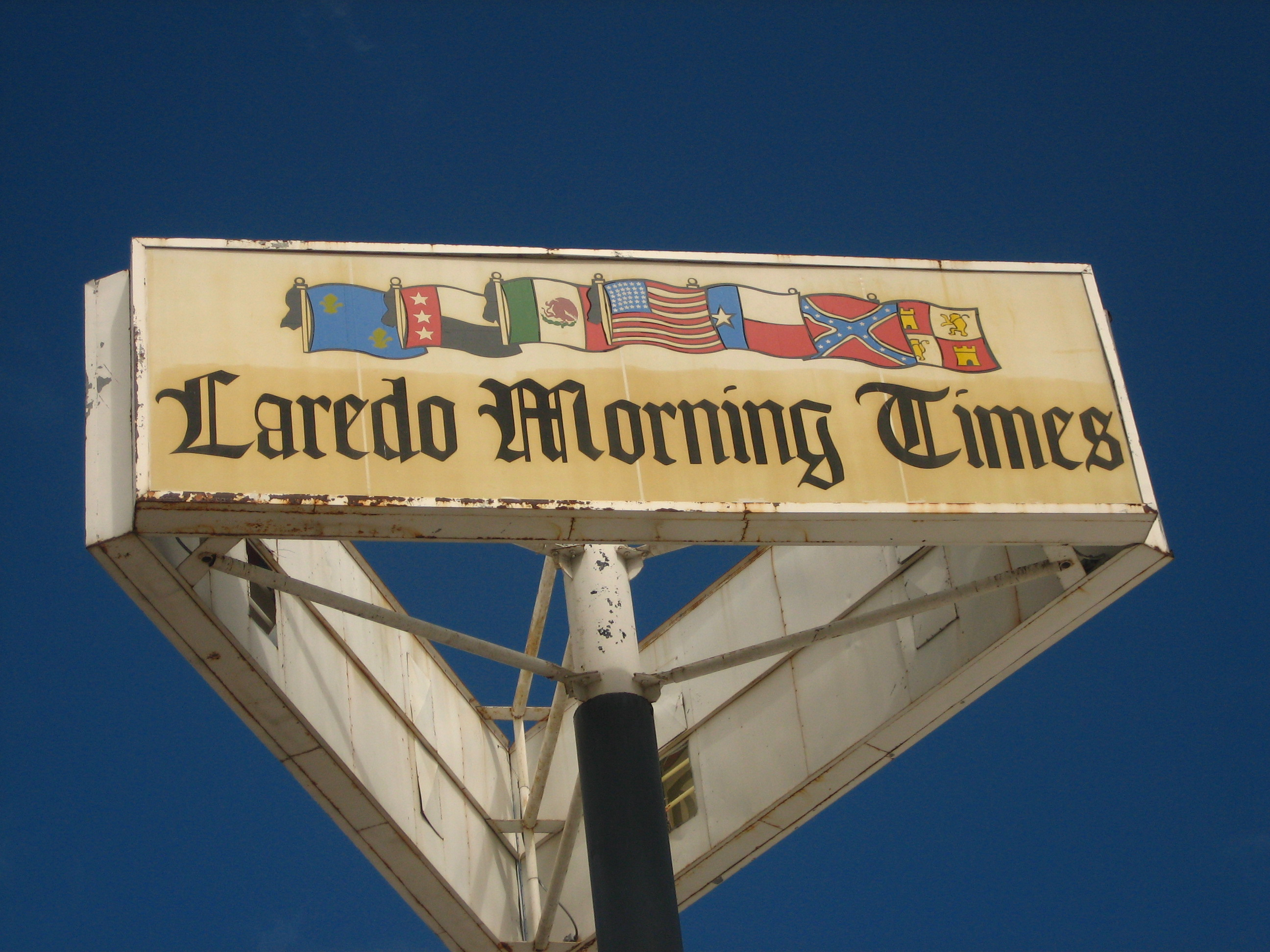
The Laredo Morning Times displays seven flags which have flown over the Laredo area during its history.

The Laredo Morning Times is a daily newspaper publication based in Laredo, Texas, USA. It is owned by the Hearst Corporation.
