= Freddie Records =

American independent record label

- Type: Private
- Industry: Music; Entertainment
- Genre: Tejano music, Norteño
- Predecessor: Studio B Recording
- Founded: November 1, 1969; 56 years ago
- Founder: Freddie Martinez, Sr.
- Headquarters: Corpus Christi, Texas
- Area served: Worldwide
- Key people: Freddie Martinez, Sr. (CEO); Freddie Martinez, Jr. (president/general manager); John Martinez (project manager); Lee Martinez (SVP)
- Products: Music; Entertainment
- Revenue: ▲US$2 million (FY 1994)
- Total assets: ▼US$1,200 (2011)
- Number of employees: 25 (1999)
- Website: freddiestore.com

Freddie Records is an American independent record label founded in Corpus Christi, Texas on November 1, 1969, by musician Freddie Martinez. Originally functioning as a recording studio and distributor for Martinez, the label expanded its roster to include other Tejano musicians to avoid financial failure. The label commenced producing albums for an array of artists, including Ramón Ayala, Agustin Ramirez, Oscar Martinez, and Joe Bravo. Ayala became the best-selling act of the label, sustaining the financial stability of Freddie Records throughout the 1970s and 1980s. The label sponsored a Little Joe concert in 1978 and recorded it for their Live for Schlitz album. It led to a ban on future events in the area, though the album remained a lucrative live recording for Freddie Records for two decades. As Tejano music's popularity surged, Freddie Records augmented its foundation by incorporating an additional 6,000 square feet for a second studio and production facility replete with updated MCI equipment capable of accommodating cassette tape and 8-track formats and instigated a release schedule of two albums per month on average.

By 1985, Freddie Records had attained the status of one of the most prosperous independent music labels in the United States. The label awarded gold and platinum certifications to Mazz for Straight from the Heart (1989) and La Sombra for Good Boys Wear White (1990), respectively, and attracted interest from major record companies due to its large catalog. Music analysts maintained that indie music labels were inadequate for rivaling major labels, designating this epoch as the culmination of independent music labels. In March 1992, Freddie Records, Sony, and Fonovisa embarked on a boycott of the Tejano Music Awards following their observation that EMI Latin's artists dominated the 1992 awards event. In July 1994, Martinez unveiled Freddie Records' 2.38-acre headquarters, outfitted with a recording studio, which aided in making Freddie Records the largest indie music label in the state of Texas, reporting $2 million in sales. Its staff could undertake most tasks in-house, including designing artwork, producing tapes, packaging, and distributing merchandise across the United States and Mexico, while CD manufacturing had to be contracted out. At the 1995 Grammy Awards, Ayala and Los Terribles del Norte were both nominated for Best Mexican-American Album, marking the first time Freddie Records' artists had received such recognition.

By 1996, Freddie Records had experienced thirty years of being the foremost purveyor of the most significant names in regional Mexican music. Despite the genre's descent, Freddie Records exhibited a 14% sales growth during the first quarter of 1997 in comparison to the same period in 1996. Tejano music journalist, Rene Cabrera, writing for the Corpus Christi Caller-Times, attributed Freddie Records' commercial triumphs and its endurance under Martinez's stewardship, which helped it to establish itself as the "premier independent Latin record label". While Billboard deemed Martinez as being conservative when seeking out new talent, the label remained vigilant in searching for musicians who can appeal to both norteño and Tejano enthusiasts. Following the establishment of the Grammy Award for Best Tejano Album in 1998, five albums created under Freddie Records were shortlisted for the inaugural 1999 ceremony. Dave Ferman of the Corpus Christi Caller-Times extolled Freddie Records as Tejano music's "most successful independent label ever", upon the Recording Academy's announcement.

In 2000, Martinez Sr., his son Martinez .Jr, and Martinez Sr's brother, Lee Martinez, faced charges of tax fraud. All three defendants denied the allegations of conspiring to defraud the Internal Revenue Service (IRS) of unpaid income tax. In June 2000, the charges were dismissed after prosecutors reviewed the evidence against the accused trio. On June 5, 2002, Martinez, Sr. inaugurated the recently renovated three-story headquarters building of Freddie Records. The construction of the building, designed by Russ Berger, incurred a cost of $4.5 million. The opening ceremony was followed by a night-long celebration featuring the label's roster and the unveiling of the company's Walk of Fame for its artists. In June 2006, Billboard ranked Freddie Records as the leading regional Mexican album imprint, outpacing Sony BMG Norte, EMI Televisa, and Fonovisa. On February 14, 2011, Freddie Records filed for bankruptcy, citing $700,000 in debt with $1,200 in assets. In October 2019, the city council of Corpus Christi released a proclamation announcing a month-long celebration commemorating the 50th anniversary of Freddie Records.

== History ==
=== 1969—1979: Creating Freddie Records and first signed acts ===
In November 1969, Freddie Martinez founded Freddie Records after he surmised that many of the independent labels he collaborated with did not promote his band, the Freddie Martinez Orchestra, adequately. Despite recording several albums with indie music labels, his band struggled to achieve significant success. Martinez believed that establishing his own enterprise was the sole means of achieving triumph. Prior to founding Freddie Records, Martinez had selected Studio B Recording to record a Tejano song and paid under $200 to utilize the studio's equipment. When Martinez recorded his song, Jim West was the resident engineer for the studio. West had previously departed from another recording studio after they rejected his and music engineer Mike Taylor's Tejano sound production, citing the studio's lack of comprehension of Tejano music. Martinez approached Studio B Recording, which was situated near the Corpus Christi Bay, with $400 (1970 USD), and the company accepted his offer in March 1970. Martinez allowed West to continue working as a music engineer, renaming the recording studio to Freddie Records. After purchasing the company, he installed a new MCI board and upgraded the technology already installed by Studio B Recording. Martinez invested $15,000 in renovating the studio and carpeted the building to prevent external sounds from interfering with recordings while adding a singer's booth to avoid the override of instruments. The renovation of the studio persisted until the autumn of 1972. Despite the initial intention of using the studio solely for his own music, music journalist Charlie Brite that the acquisition of Studio B Recording could open doors for entertainers in South Texas and reinvigorate the music market in the region. The acquisition was lauded as the first bank loan granted for a music venture in South Texas. Freddie Records withstood Hurricane Celia in August 1970, which had a bleak outlook for businesses in the area at the time.

Martinez's first recording as the proprietor of Freddie Records was "Necesito Tu Amor" which became a regional success, followed by "Botancito de Carino". Martinez partnered with distributors he knew before founding Freddie Records and enforced a cash-on-delivery policy on distributors known to delay payments. Due to his policy, Martinez was dubbed the "golden haired boy" among his contemporaries. Martinez's wife, Joann, also contributed to the company's success by accepting orders from distributors and shipping them across the country. Freddie Records' first album, Te Traiga Estas Flores, achieved a rare feat for a Tejano recording, as it ranked on the Latin albums chart for New York compiled by Billboard. The album also went gold, which was an infrequent occurrence in the Tejano music industry at that time. Eventually, it sold one million copies in the United States and Mexico. By 1974, it was commonplace for albums produced by Freddie Records to rank on the Billboard Latin albums chart for the state of Texas. Albums produced by the company also attained spots on Billboard's Latin album charts in Chicago, Los Angeles, and Miami. Country music artists Sam Neely and Don Williams utilized Freddie Records for their albums. In an article for Texas Monthly, Joe Nick Patoski observed that most Tejano musicians who ventured into business had failed. Patoski listed Martinez among the select few who had succeeded. To avoid his company's failure if he were no longer commercially viable as a musician, Martinez signed a few acts to Freddie Records, including Agustin Ramirez, Oscar Martinez, and Joe Bravo. Ramirez's album was titled Numero Uno Orta Vez so that Martinez's contemporaries took him seriously. A 1974 Billboard report found Freddie Records to be "highly profitable" during a music report on the growth of Tejano music. Martinez's original intentions for Freddie Records were to become the most prosperous studio in South Texas, rival Los Angeles studios, and revitalize the stagnant music business in Corpus Christi.

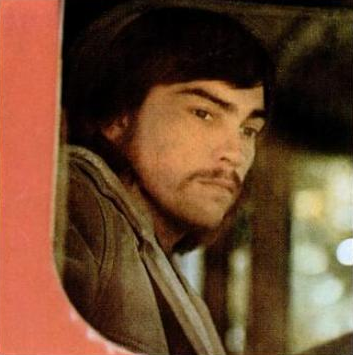
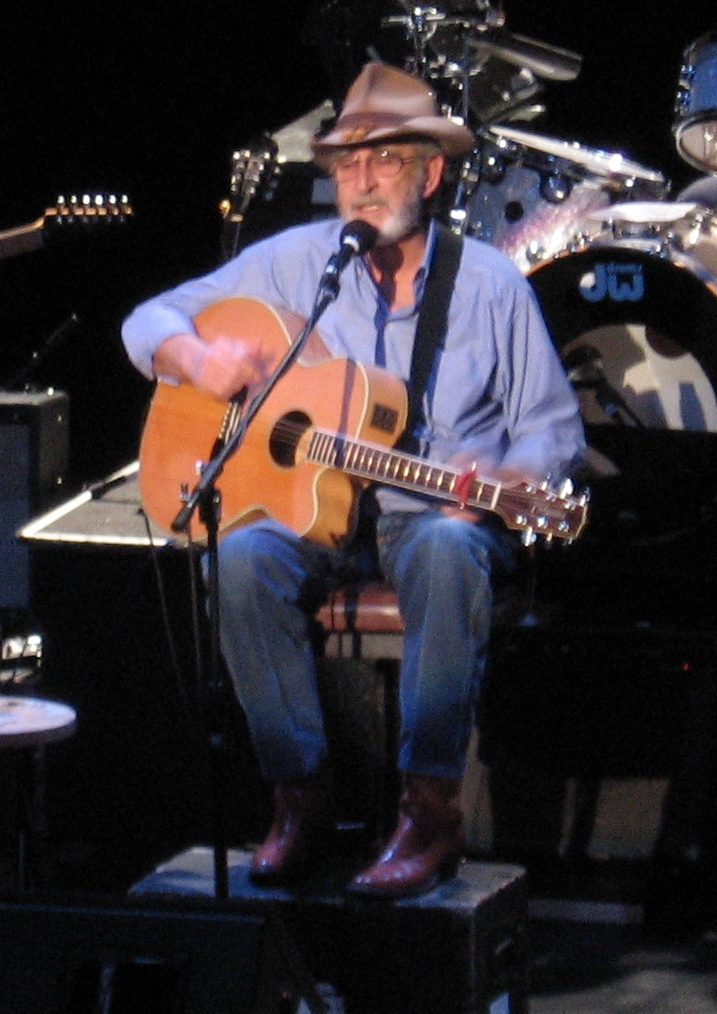
Sam Neely (pictured in 1977) and Don Williams have utilized Freddie Records in the mid-1970s.

Freddie Records, like most independent music labels in Texas, did not rely on contracts with recording artists. Instead, they negotiated a price with musicians based on their popularity. The label would sell albums to flea market vendors and mom and pop shops, and artists could purchase their own albums at a reduced price and resell them at concerts. This was standard practice for Tejano musicians before major department stores started selling Tejano albums. The exception to this practice was the label's first artist, Ramon Ayala, who became the first artist to sign an exclusive contract with Freddie Records in 1973. Ayala became the company's top-selling act, allowing Freddie Records to remain commercially viable throughout the 1970s and 1980s. The label expected their artists to excel in the company's return exchange formula, requiring them to be self-promoting and put on exceptional concerts to secure bookings for future events. Martinez had to delay plans for further developments in the company, such as a crossover into English-language music, entering the film production market, and expanding Freddie's Studio B with a 16-track acquisition, following a recession in the United States in the mid-1970s. These plans were being handled by his brother and promotions manager.

In 1976, songwriter Johnny Herrera sued Martinez for $1 million in royalties (1976 USD) alleging that he was not compensated for his works that he provided for the company. On May 1, 1978, Freddie Records sponsored a concert at Cole Park in Corpus Christi, which was initially expected to attract 1,000 people but swelled to 10,000 after Martinez promised free records to attendees and expanded the roster of bands. The park's permit was issued to the Johnny Rodriguez Cerebral Palsy Organization that was co-sponsored by KCCT. The city manager, Marvin Townsend, believed the event was instead turned into "a birthday party" for Freddie Records. The concert was recorded by Freddie Records for their artist Little Joe and marketed as the first live album to be recorded at a local park, titled Live for Schlitz, for the Schlitz beer company. The album was released on June 18, 1979, and continued to be a lucrative recording for Freddie Records for two decades. The concert faced opposition from residents who complained of noise violations to the city council, which banned future events in the area. In the same year, Martinez began providing music contracts to his artists, with a standard three-year contract exclusively with the label and two one-year contracts with an average return in royalties. Martinez's house engineer West, had departed to make competitor Hacienda Records. The two labels were the two most influential record labels in the Tejano music market during the 1970s and 1980s. Freddie Records, along with Hacienda, recorded most of the music from major Tejano recording artists who helped shaped the genre during the 20th century. The label was receiving 10-20 demo tapes every week from Tejano music hopefuls, and Martinez would press 1,500 singles for a musician he was interested in, with 400-450 sent out to radio stations and the remainder sold to stores. Martinez considered a successful recording in the Tejano music market to be 20,000 units sold.

=== 1980—1999: Golden age and decline of Tejano music ===
In the 1980s, Freddie Records had great sales in Texas and reported sales in other states like Arizona, New Mexico, Colorado, Florida, Hawaii, California, and Nevada, and even in Germany, mostly due to the US Army personnel stationed there. They had a distribution facility that was capable of making 30,000 cassette tapes a month, near their recording studio and office in Corpus Christi. The Tejano music market in Corpus Christi was "booming with popularity". Freddie Records expanded its base with an additional 6,000 square feet for a second studio and production facility with updated MCI equipment capable of handling cassette tape and 8-track formats, and began averaging two releases per month. However, by 1986, the Tejano music market began to slow down and suffer, with underperforming sales for Freddie Records. The label began suing small record stores that were knowingly selling counterfeited albums and imports from Mexican artists in the area. Latin music in Texas was a decade behind the American music industry in terms of development, marketing, and production capabilities. In 1989, Jesus Guterrez wrote for Billboard, stating that the Tejano music genre still had a long way to go before it could attain any significant gains, despite its steady climb in popularity in Texas.

Freddie Records was known for having employees who were also musicians themselves, with Lee Martinez revealing that 99% of their staff belonged to the music industry. The label also discovered talent from within their own company, such as Zandra, who worked as a secretary for Freddie Records from 1978 to 1981 and was later discovered by Lee Martinez for her singing talent. Lee was searching for a female backing vocalist for the Spanish-language cover of Johnny Lee's "Lookin' for Love" (1980). The company was planning on releasing an album featuring Texan musicians singing country music songs in Spanish. In 1985, Freddie Records had become one of the most successful indie music labels in the US. However, major record labels started entering the Tejano music market in 1985 and by 1989, EMI Latin, WEA Latina, Sony, and Fonovisa, had signed Tejano acts. On January 10, 1990, EMI Latin bought Bob Grever's Cara Records, beginning the golden age of Tejano music. Martinez reflected on the era in an interview that he believed the major labels saw the rise of the Tejano music market and wanted to do what the indie music labels were already doing saying that the major labels were "expecting too much too soon".

Despite the increased competition, Freddie Records continued to achieve commercial success and awarded gold and platinum plaques to their artists for their album sales; Mazz was awarded a gold certification for their album Straight from the Heart (1989), and La Sombra was awarded a platinum and gold plaque for their album Good Boys Wear White (1990). Martinez Sr., began running the company with his son, Freddie Martinez, Jr., who had previously worked in the warehouse of the company as a child, after graduating from Corpus Christi State University. Martinez Jr. Together, they produced or co-produced albums for their artists, signed new acts, and oversaw the company's publishing business. Martinez Sr. also brought on his other son, John Martinez, to help run the business. Despite major record companies offering to buy Freddie Records, citing the company's catalog, music critics speculated that this marked the end of the era of indie music labels, with the future of the genre appearing to be with major labels. In November 1991, the label opened its subsidiary Freddie Discos Mexico in León, Guanajuato, and the following year, Freddie Records, along with Sony and Fonovisa, boycotted the Tejano Music Awards due to concerns over the voting process. A fourth label, TH-Rodven, joined the company's boycott of the awards by December 1992. Executive director for the program, Rudy Trevino, revealed that the 1992 TMA ballots followed a special survey it conducted in 1991 for possible recommendations on the program's voting process which president of Sony Discos Frank Welzer participated in, as did radio programmers, distributors, and other industry experts.

Freddie Records granted Fandango USA album Class Act (1993) a platinum award, and in July 1994, Martinez unveiled the newly built multimillion-dollar headquarters of Freddie Records, which made the company the largest indie music label in Texas. Martinez expanded his label's reach with a promotional office in Hollywood and expanded his staff to over 30 employees. The newly built headquarters opened its doors in November 1994. The headquarters had an in-house recording studio, and most operations such as creating artwork, tape manufacturing, packaging, and shipment throughout the United States and Mexico were performed in-house, with CD manufacturing being the only operation done off-site. The company reported $2 million (1995 USD) in sales for 1994, and emphasized new and young talent. Ayala and Los Terribles del Norte, artists from Freddie Records, received a nomination for Best Mexican-American Album at the 1995 Grammy Awards, marking the first time Freddie Records' artists made the shortlist. Jaime y Loos Chamacos also received a gold award for Se Cansaron?... Otra and Como Te Llamas Paloma? in May 1995.

By 1996, Freddie Records had been the leading supplier of top regional Mexican music for three decades, with Ayala as its best-selling artist. Although the company had limited video production due to the high cost, it purchased a plot of land to unite its office, warehouse, duplication, and studios. In an interview with Billboard in 1997, Martinez found that radio stations were predominantly dominated by veteran Tejano musicians, and emphasized the importance of new Tejano musicians as the lifeblood and future of the genre. Despite the decline of Tejano music, Freddie Records posted a 14% sales gain in the first quarter of 1997. The label's top-selling artists that year were Ayala, Jaime y Los Chamacos, and Fandango USA. In September 1997, Martinez planned to build a 32-channel "state-of-the-art studio" in South Corpus Christi, and that year he was inducted into the Tejano Roots Hall of Fame. Tejano music journalist Rene Cabrera of the Corpus Christi Caller-Times, praised Freddie Records' commercial success and longevity under Martinez's leadership, which helped it to become the "premier independent Latin record label". In 1998, Freddie Records had "a prosperous year" due to Ayala's tribute album to Cornelio Reyna, En Las Alas de Un Angel, which sold 100,000 units, and Los Terribles del Norte's album El Ultimo Paso, which sold 80,000 units. Billboard found Martinez to be conservative when scouting for new acts, but the label actively searched for musicians who could appeal to both norteno music and Tejano audiences. In 1999, five albums produced by Freddie Records were nominated for the inaugural Grammy Award for Best Tejano Album. Among the nominees was Martinez's Leyendas y Raices, La Fiebre's Live...En Concierto!, Jaime y Los Chamacos's Fanaticos, Ayala's Casas de Madera, and Los Terribles del Norte Colgado de un Arbol. Dave Ferman of the Corpus Christi Caller-Times hailed Freddie Records as Tejano music's "most successful independent label ever" following the Recording Academy's announcement. By 1999, Ayala continued to be the label's best-selling act, with an average of 100,000 units sold per studio album, while Los Terribles del Norte sold 75,000 units per album.

=== 2000—present: Continued success and lawsuits ===
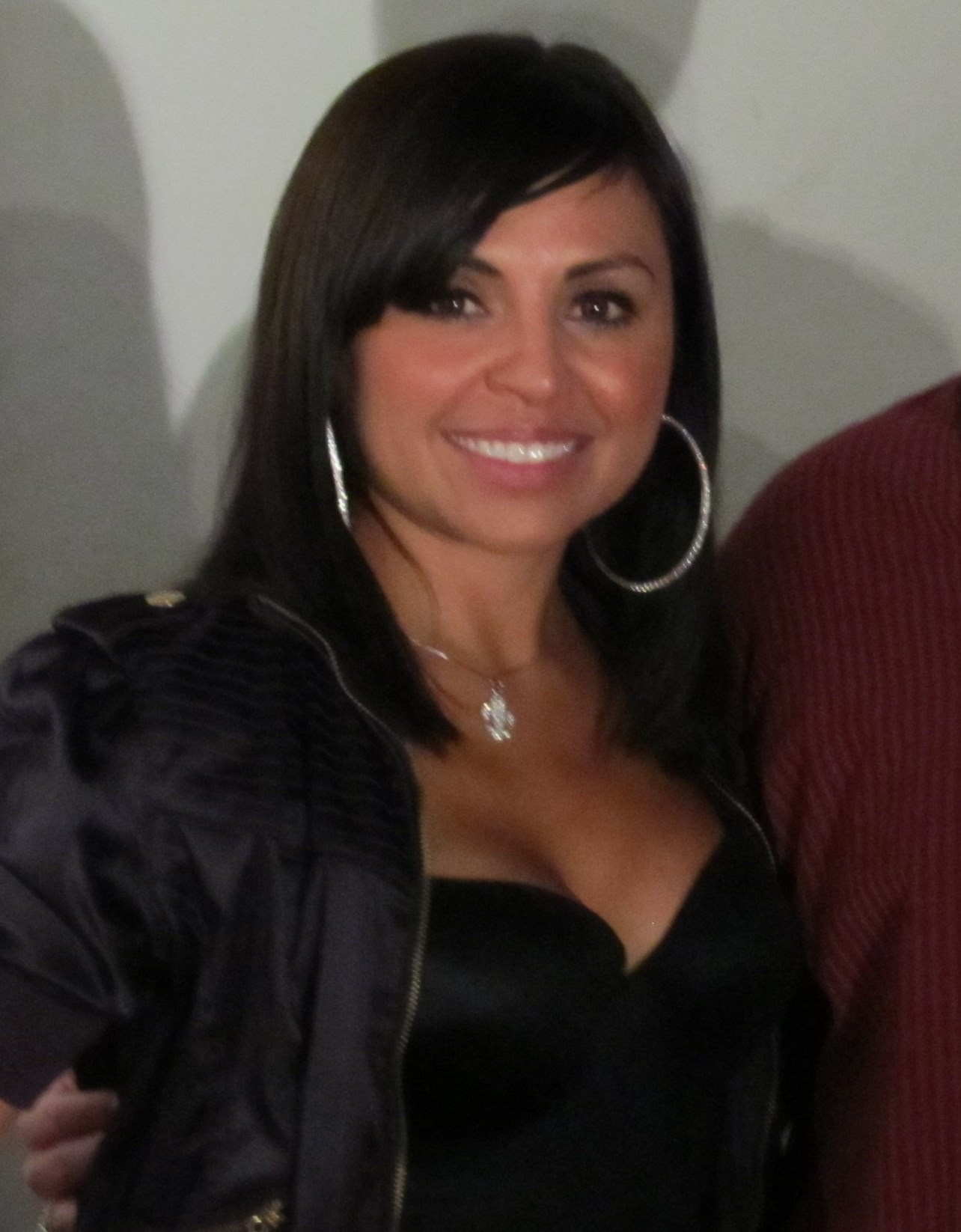
Elida Reyna signed with Freddie Records in the 2000s.

In December 1999, Martinez was indicted by a federal grand jury for allegedly failing to report the label's sales revenues. On January 4, 2000, federal judge Hayden Wilson Head Jr., postponed the trial of Martinez Sr, Martinez Jr, and Lee on tax fraud charges to June 12, after the defense attorney requested one with no objections. All pleaded not guilty to the charges of conspiring to defraud the Internal Revenue Service (IRS) of $99,637 of unpaid income tax from June 1991 to February 1995. The indictment also alleges that the three understated their sales receipts and revenues of $389,446. However, the charges were later dismissed in June of the following year after prosecutors reviewed the evidence against them. Martinez recognized the potential of the internet as a tool for promoting new artists and included audio and video archives, music news, and message boards on the label's website.

In 2002, Freddie Records entered a joint venture with WEA Latina for Ayala's tribute album for Pedro Infante. WEA Latina owns Infante's catalog, after the label's acquisition of Mexico's Peerless Records. Both labels financed the project and marketed the album through a direct-TV campaign. The labels shipped 100,000 units throughout the United States in its initial production run. Ayala released his 100th album with Freddie Records, El Numero Cien in 2002. On June 5, 2002, Martinez unveiled the newly renovated three-story headquarters building of Freddie Records. The building was designed by Russ Berger and cost $4.5 million to build. The opening ceremony was followed by an all-night celebration from the label's roster as well as the introduction of the company's Walk of Fame for its artists. Luis Silva, who became the company's marketing director, announced that the label began singing banda music musicians.

In 2004, Martinez believed that Freddie Records had the most impressive roster in its history after signing several renowned artists who were previously signed to major labels. At the 2004 Tejano Music Awards, Freddie Records dominated with 12 artist nominations across several categories. In 2006, Antologia, a double-disc retrospective 30-track budget series for Freddie Records' artists was released. The label released the Antologia series, a double-disc 30-track retrospective budget series in 2006, which initially had slow sales. However, after a promotional campaign by the company, sales skyrocketed, reaching nearly 400,000 units sold by the end of the year. Martinez wanted to capitalize on the catalog music market, following Sony's success with their La Historia series. In June 2006, Billboard named Freddie Records as the top regional Mexican album imprint, surpassing Sony BMG Norte, EMI Televisa, and Fonovisa.

In October 2019, the Corpus Christi city council proclaimed a month-long celebration of Freddie Records' 50th anniversary. In December 2019, the company commemorated its 50th anniversary in the Anchor Ballroom at Texas A&M University-Corpus Christi.

== Roster ==
=== Current ===
This is a list of artists currently signed to Freddie Records.

- Freddie Martinez, Sr.
- Ramón Ayala
- Gary Hobbs
- Stevie D
- Pio Treviño y Majic
- David Farias
- Lucky Joe
- La Fiebre
- Alazzan
- Los Palominos
- Grupo Vidal
- David Farias
- Grupo Solido
- Michael Salgado
- Elida Reyna
- Grupo Zamorales
- Siggno
- Grupo Masizzo

=== Former ===
- Agapito Zuniga y su Conjunto
- Agustin Ramirez
- Arturo Montes y Ternura
- Alfredo Zuniga
- Atrapado
- Alma Tejana
- Cecilio Garza y Los Kasinos
- Cha Cha Jiminez (Los Chachos)
- Cornelio Reyna
- Cindy Garza y Grupo Huracan
- Carlos y Jose
- Cana Verde
- Conjunto Madrigal de Salmone Gonzales
- City View
- Cadena
- Delia y Culturas
- Delores y Esperanza
- Eddie Olivares
- Fandango USA
- Grupo Estrella
- Grupo Centenario
- Gavino
- Grupo Huracan
- Grupo Sierra
- Jaime y Los Chamacos
- Jesse Marroquin y Calidad
- Jimmy Gonzalez y Grupo Mazz
- Joe Bravo
- Joe López
- Jody Farias y Increible
- Karloz
- Los Huracanes del Norte
- La Sombra
- Little Joe
- Los Bandidos
- Los Cachorros de Juan Villarreal
- Lennie Salinas
- Los Donnenos
- Los Terribles del Norte
- Los Fabulosos
- Latin Breed
- Los Invasores de Nuevo Leon
- Los Hermanos Barron
- Los Baron de Apodaca
- Los Rancheritos de Topochico
- Los Playboys
- Los Sultanes de Nuevo Leon
- Leticia y Xperiencia
- Leonard Gonzales y Los Magnificos
- La Tropa F
- Oscar Martinez
- Ojinaga
- Pantera del Norte
- Potente
- Patsy Torres
- Rene Zapata y Grupo Presidente
- Roberto Pulido
- Ram y Henry
- Selena y Los Dinos
- Sunny and the Sunliners
- Tony de la Rosa
- Xplosivo (or Explosivo)
- Zavala
- Zandra

== See also ==
- List of record labels

== Works cited ==
- Cobo, Leila (December 7, 2002). "Warner Music Latina, Freddie Records Join for Infante Tribute". Billboard. Vol. 114, no. 49.
- Guterrez, Jesus; Wilson, Bill (December 28, 1989). "Billboard Spotlight: Texas Music". Billboard. Vol. 93, no. 47.
- San Miguel, Guadalupe (2002). Tejano proud : Tex-Mex music in the twentieth century. Texas A & M University Press. p. 192. ISBN 1585441880.
- Ragland, Cathy (2009). Música norteña : Mexican migrants creating a nation between nations. Temple Univ. Press. p. 268. ISBN 978-1592137480.
- Forrest, Ricardo (October 24, 1981). "Latin Potential: The Next Great Growth Market". Billboard. Vol. 93, no. 42.
- Sippel, John (September 7, 1974). "Texas Racks Competitive". Billboard. Vol. Billboard, no. 86. p. 36.
- Zuniga, Joe (July 20, 1974). "Freddie in Chicago". Billboard. Vol. 86, no. 29.
- Burr, Ramiro (May 8, 2004). "State of Independents DIY Texas Acts, Labels Thrive". Billboard. Vol. 116, no. 19.
- Burr, Ramiro (July 19, 1997). "Regional Mexican Music Dances Through a Changing Landscape". Billboard. Vol. 109, no. 29.
- Patoski, Joe Nick (May 1978). "Little Joe". Texas Monthly. 6 (6).
- Silva, Lupe; Brite, Charlie (July 27, 1974). "Due Long Paid: Texas Chicano Scene on Verge of Major Growth". Billboard. Vol. 86, no. 30.
- Agudelo, Carlos (December 14, 1985). "Widening Latino Influence". Billboard. Vol. 97, no. 50.
- Peña, Manuel H. (1999). Música tejana : the cultural economy of artistic transformation. Texas A & M University Press. p. 239. ISBN 0890968888.
- Burr, Ramiro (July 25, 1998). "Mexican Music Market is Booming Due to Diverse Talent and a Loyal Immigrant Audience". Billboard. Vol. 110, no. 30.
- Lannert, John (August 28, 1999). "Latin Music 6 Pack". Billboard. Vol. 111, no. 35.
- Lannert, John; Burr, Ramiro (August 17, 1996). "Ready and Willing Labels Scramble to Get Slices of Regional Mexican Pie". Billboard. Vol. 108, no. 33.
- Burr, Ramiro (August 26, 2000). "Viva Los Dot-Coms". Billboard. Vol. 112, no. 35.
- Lannert, John (January 8, 2000). "Latin Notas". Billboard. Vol. 112, no. 2.
- Cobo, Leila (June 8, 2002). "Latin Notas". Billboard. Vol. 114, no. 23.
- Cobo, Leila (November 18, 2006). "Norteno Iconos Los Tigres del Norte". Billboard. Vol. 118, no. 46.
- Brite, Charlie (September 30, 1972). "Brite Ideds". Corpus Christi Caller-Times – via Newspapers.com.
- Brite, Charlie (November 25, 1972). "Brite Ideds". Corpus Christi Caller-Times – via Newspapers.com.
- Gonzalez, Guile (October 24, 1976). "Chicano Beat: Composer Hits the Top Without Much Money". Corpus Christi Caller-Times – via Newspapers.com.
- Mortensen, Eleanor (May 3, 1978). "Council Silences Cole Concerts". Corpus Christi Caller-Times – via Newspapers.com.
- Gilpin, Linda (September 16, 1979). "Hacienda: Home-Cooked Recordings". Corpus Christi Caller-Times – via Newspapers.com.
- Spies, Michael (December 2, 1979). "For the Record". Corpus Christi Caller-Times – via Newspapers.com.
- Mortensen, Eleanor (December 6, 1979). "Around the City". Corpus Christi Caller-Times – via Newspapers.com.
- Burr, Ramiro (March 1, 1987). "Hispanic Music". Corpus Christi Caller-Times – via Newspapers.com.
- Patoski, Joe Nick (1996). Selena: Como La Flor. Boston: Little Brown and Company. ISBN 0-316-69378-2.
- Burr, Ramiro (1999). The Billboard Guide to Tejano and Regional Mexican Music. Billboard books. ISBN 0-8230-7691-1.
- Suarez, Carmen (March 16, 1990). "Tejanos Not Just Another Awards Show". Abilene Reporter-News – via Newspapers.com.
- "Freddie Records Notice". Corpus Christi Caller-Times. November 18, 1990 – via Newspapers.com.
- "Tejano Singer Makes Corpus Texas' 'Nashville By the Sea'". Corpus Christi Caller-Times. April 19, 1991 – via Newspapers.com.
- Cabrera, Rene (August 9, 1991). "La Mafia Steals into Alice Saturday". Corpus Christi Caller-Times – via Newspapers.com.
- Maldonado, Vilma (March 29, 1992). "Trevino: Tejano Awards Situation Not Hopeless". The Monitor – via Newspapers.com.
- Burr, Ramiro (December 17, 1992). "Label Boycott Mars Awards". Austin American-Statesman – via Newspapers.com.
- Cabrera, Rene (February 5, 1993). "Selena Tapes New Album at Coliseum". Corpus Christi Caller-Times – via Newspapers.com.
- Cabrera, Rene (July 2, 1993). "Bands to Perform at Local, Area Nightspots". Corpus Christi Caller-Times – via Newspapers.com.
- Stein, Steve (July 10, 1994). "Businesses Flock to Southside". Corpus Christi Caller-Times – via Newspapers.com.
- Burr, Ramiro (September 2, 1994). "Freddie Records Puts Emphasis On Young Talent". Fort Worth Star-Telegram – via Newspapers.com.
- Cabrera, Rene (January 13, 1995). "Grammy Award Nominees Have Links to Corpus Christi". Corpus Christi Caller-Times – via Newspapers.com.
- Galindo-Mendez, Mary (February 11, 1995). "Tejano Awards Celebrate Success of Hispanic Music". Corpus Christi Caller-Times – via Newspapers.com.
- Maldonado, Vilma (May 26, 1995). "Happening Jaime de Anda Thrills Nightclub Crowd". The Monitor – via Newspapers.com.
- Cabrera, Rene (January 24, 1997). "Martinez Sr., Being Honored at Reception Tonight". Corpus Christi Caller-Times – via Newspapers.com.
- Maldonado, Vilma (March 20, 1998). "Legendary Singers Defined Music for a Generation of Mexican-Americans Across the state and, Eventually Beyond". The Monitor – via Newspapers.com.
- "Freddie Records Get 5 Shot at Grammy". Corpus Christi Caller-Times. January 6, 1999 – via Newspapers.com.
- Ferman, Dave (January 17, 1999). "All in the Family". Fort Worth Star-Telegram – via Newspapers.com.
- Parker, Dan (January 5, 2000). "Freddie Records Tax Trial is Delayed". Corpus Christi Caller-Times – via Newspapers.com.
- "Federal Charges Against Record Execs Dismissed". Corpus Christi Caller-Times. June 15, 2000 – via Newspapers.com.
- Foley, Sara (May 5, 2011). "Freddie Records Says It's Broke". Corpus Christi Caller-Times – via Newspapers.com.
- Hendricks, Dave (December 14, 2014). "New Lawsuit Filed Against Record Firm". Corpus Christi Caller-Times – via Newspapers.com.
- Hinojosa, Cassandra (December 14, 2014). "Freddie Records Leads Tejano Nominations". Corpus Christi Caller-Times – via Newspapers.com.
- Hinojosa, Cassandra (July 6, 2006). "Freddie Records Music Label Magazines Honored in Billboard". Corpus Christi Caller-Times – via Newspapers.com.
- "Freddie Records earns city proclamation for 50th anniversary". KRIS 6 News. October 29, 2019.
- "Freddie Records celebrates 50th anniversary with free event". KRIS 6 News. December 10, 2019.
- Medina, John Henry (April 20, 2022). "Gary Hobbs signs with Freddie Records". Tejano Nation.
- Medina, John Henry (April 20, 2022). "Stevie D signs with Freddie Records". Tejano Nation.
- Medina, John Henry (September 13, 2019). "Pio Treviño Y Magic sign with Freddie Records, new album slated for fall release". Tejano Nation.
- Medina, John Henry (July 15, 2019). "David Farias working on new album with Freddie Records". Tejano Nation.
- "Freddie Records to release '40 Éxitos' from Elida Reyna Y Avante on November 17". Tejano Nation. October 19, 2017.
- Medina, John Henry (August 3, 2017). "Lucky Joe extends contract with Freddie Records, buys RV for touring". Tejano Nation.
- "Los Palominos release long-awaited new album 'Con La Fuerza De Un Huracan' [AUDIO]". Tejano Nation. October 4, 2019.
- "Freddie Records Artists Nominated for 16th Annual Latin Grammy Awards". Tejano Nation. September 24, 2015.
- Torres, Vanessa (September 24, 2019). "Freddie Records dominates 2019 Latin Grammy nominees for Best Tejano Album". Tejano Nation.
- Carrizales, Sylvia M. (May 23, 2022). "David Farias discusses upcoming new music, family, and more". Tejano Nation.
- Jaimez, Eladio (April 14, 2011). "Progreso's Fab 4 Shine at District 32-3A Gold Tournament". The Monitor – via Newspapers.com.
- Pena, Dan; Leo, Barbi (May 5, 2006). "Siggno Signs Record Contract". Corpus Christi Caller-Times – via Newspapers.com.
- Hinojosa, Cassandra (September 14, 2006). "Freddie Records Signs Dilley's Masizzo". Corpus Christi Caller-Times – via Newspapers.com.
- "Sister, Sister". The Seguin Gazette-Enterprise. March 7, 1997 – via Newspapers.com.
- Gonzalez, Guille (August 14, 1977). "Chicano Music, Big Changes in the Music Scene". Corpus Christi Caller-Times – via Newspapers.com.
- Cabrera, Rene (September 20, 1991). "La Sombra Fever Heats Up Yellow Rose". Corpus Christi Caller-Times – via Newspapers.com.
- Cabrera, Rene (October 3, 1997). "Garza Headlines Ingleside Festival". Corpus Christi Caller-Times – via Newspapers.com.
- Gonzalez, Guille (July 31, 1977). "Concert to Ring at Noon". Corpus Christi Caller-Times – via Newspapers.com.
- Maldonado, Vilma (March 18, 1994). "New York City's Hard Rock Cafe to Host Estrella". The Monitor – via Newspapers.com.
- "Top Tejano Singles". Austin American-Statesman. November 8, 1990 – via Newspapers.com.
- Cabrera, Rene (November 20, 1998). "Los Palominos and Hot Newcomer Grupo Huracan Play Alice". Corpus Christi Caller-Times – via Newspapers.com.
- Romero, Linda (August 11, 2000). "Grupo Sierra Basks in Glory of Recent Recognition". The Monitor – via Newspapers.com.
- Maria Cortes, Gonzalez (September 16, 1994). "For Singer Patsy Torres, No Regrets to Remember". El Paso Times – via Newspapers.com.
