= Juanita García =

American singer

- Born: Juanita García; February 14, 1943; McAllen, Texas
- Died: January 26, 2014 (aged 70) McAllen, Texas
- Occupation: Singer
- Years active: 1948-1970's

Juanita García (February 14, 1943 — McAllen, Texas January 26, 2014) was a Tejano singer.

== Career ==
Juanita García began her career at the age of eighteen in 1948, despite her parents disapproval of her career choice. In 1951, she won first place at a singing contest which landed her a recording contract with Falcon Records and became known for her bolero song "Llorarás". Garcia continued touring during the 1960s singing with accordionist Beto Villa, Mexican actors Piporro and Ángel Infante, as well as with norteño music singers Los Alegres de Terán and Los Donneños. Historically, female musicians were seen as inferior to their male counterparts, were commercially less successful than male performers, and were often turned down by music organizers who wanted sellouts. Garcia achieved modicum success in the tejano music market during the 1960s along with other female singers Rosita Fernandez, Ventura Alonzo "Queen of the Accordion", Delia Gutiérrez, and Beatriz Llamaz.

Garcia suffered from a medical condition in her throat, which ended her singing career in the early 1970s. She decided to work in the family grocery store business and became the subject of the University of Texas at Austin's Texas Music Museum who documented her career and was the subject of a documentary that featured female tejano singers entitled Musica Tejana: The History and Development of Tejano Music. She was inducted into the tejano music hall of fame in 2005.
