= Los Hermanos Ayala =

- Origin: American
- Genres: Conjunto
- Instruments: conjunto music
- Years active: 1956 - present
- Labels: Falcon Records, Bego Records, Bronco Records, Cometa Records, Ideal Records, Ayala Records, Bernal Records, National Records, R y N Records

Los Hermanos Ayala was an American conjunto group from South Texas. Sons to Pedro Ayala El Monarca del Accordion, Los Hermanos Ayala consisted of Pedro Ayala Jr., Ramon Ayala, and Emilio Ayala.
