= The Billboard Guide to Tejano and Regional Mexican Music =

- Author: Ramiro Burr
- Language: English
- Series: The Billboard Guide to...
- Subject: Tejano music, regional Mexican music
- Genre: Non-fiction; Encyclopedic; Reference
- Publisher: Billboard Books
- Publication date: 1999
- Publication place: United States
- Media type: paperback
- Pages: 260
- ISBN: 0-8230-7691-1

The Billboard Guide To Tejano and Regional Mexican Music is a music reference and encyclopedia on Tejano and Regional Mexican music. Written by San Antonio Express-News music editor Ramiro Burr, the music guide was published in 1999 by Billboard Books. It was published during the 1990s "Latin music explosion", a period when Latin music entered the popular market and during the end of the golden age of Tejano music.

== Content ==
The book's back cover touts that it contains the "never-before-told history of this innovative and influential musical genre". The book includes the musical biographies and discographies of 300 musicians in the Tejano, norteño, grupero, mariachi, banda, and technobanda fields, as well as some artists from other genres outside regional Mexican such as cumbia, vallenato, romantic trio and Latin pop. The artists are listed alphabetically. The music guide also includes a glossary and Burr's "top 10" albums and singles of various regional Mexican music genres.

The guide also includes an essay on the evolution of Tejano and regional Mexican music.

== Reception ==
The music guide was published in 1999, a period when Latin music entered the popular market and during the end of the 1990s Tejano music renaissance era. In the 1990s, Tejano music became one of the fastest-growing musical genres in the United States and began to decline in popularity after the shooting death of American tejano singer Selena in March 1995.

Music critics and musicians in the genre have since praised the book's release, calling it "overdue" and one of the best music guides for Latin music fans. Mario Tarradell of The Dallas Morning News, called the book "complete and comprehensive" and recommended it to music journalist. Joe Nick Patoski, editor of Texas Monthly, called it "an extensive examination". Director of Texas Music Office, Casey Monahan called the music guide "an important and timely contribution". Michael Greene, president of the National Academy of Recording Arts and Sciences believed the book "comes not a minute too soon" during a time "when the whole world seems to be discovering and rediscovering the exciting Latin music forms" and called the book "valuable and culturally important".

== See also ==
- Billboard magazine
- Billboard Top Latin Albums
- Billboard Latin Pop Albums
- Billboard Regional Mexican Albums
- Encyclopedia of Popular Music

== Sources ==
- Burr, Ramiro (1999). The Billboard Guide to Tejano and Regional Mexican Music. Billboard books. ISBN 0-8230-7691-1.
