= Relámpago (disambiguation) =

Relámpago is the Spanish word for lightning.

Relámpago, El Relámpago or Relampago may refer to:

== Fiction ==
- Relampago, a comic book character created by Margarito C. Garza and the title of the comic book that introduced him
- Relámpago Vivo, the Spanish translation and alias of the comic book superhero, Living Lightning

== Other uses ==
- Relámpago (wrestler) (born 1981), Mexican professional wrestler
- El Relampago, a pseudonym of Cuban wrestler Konnan (born 1964)
- Los Relámpagos del Norte, a Mexican norteño band
- Relampago, Texas, United States
