= Placido Salazar =

Tejano singer and war veteran

Plácido Salazar
- Born: 1939 (age 85–86); Edcouch, Texas
- Genres: Tejano
- Occupations: Singer-songwriter, DJ, promoter
- Instrument: guitar
- Years active: 1948–present
- Spouse: Maria

Plácido Salazar (born in 1939) is an American singer-songwriter, radio personality, and a retired United States Air Force airman and a recipient of the Purple Heart and the Bronze Star with Valor for his actions during the Vietnam War. Salazar began performing at talent shows across the Rio Grande Valley as a young child and released his debut single around 1947 backed by Pedro Ayala on Discos Del Valle. Enlisting in the Air Force in 1956, Salazar volunteered for deployment to Vietnam from August to November 1965, serving with the 4080th Strategic Reconnaissance Wing. Amid intense combat, he rescued two wounded officers, secured classified materials, and was deeply affected after discovering the remains of two children during the attack. He later battled post-traumatic stress disorder (PTSD) and retired from military service in 1976.

Salazar turned to Tejano music and performed in local venues with his conjunto band, working as a disc jockey, and composing songs for Tejano artists such as La Mafia and Flaco Jimenez. Salazar produced his television program, The Placido Salazar Show on QVC for 15 years. He became a veterans' rights activist and was caught on live TV confronting then-presidential candidate Barack Obama on the need to build a veterans hospital in the Rio Grande Valley. Salazar was inducted into the Tejano Roots Hall of Fame and the San Antonio Radio Hall of Fame for his contributions to music and broadcasting. He was awarded the Tejano Music Award for Lifetime Achievement, along with David Marez, at the 2024 Tejano Music Awards.

== Life and career ==
At seven years old, Plácido Salazar's father taught him how to play the guitar. Salazar began singing at talent shows across the Rio Grande Valley and won first place at each occurrence, winning $10 (1939 USD) as a prize. During a singing competition held at El Capitan Theater in San Benito, Texas, a kid approached Salazar and informed him that San Benito is his town and he intends to win the competition. Salazar won that night and the child who confronted Salazar later became known as Freddy Fender. A year later, Salazar recorded his first single backed by Pedro Ayala on Discos Del Valle.

In 1956, Salazar joined the Air Force and was stationed at the Randolph Air Force Base from 1966 to 1974. Salazar volunteered for deployment to Vietnam and served at Bien Hoa Air Base from August to November 1965. He served as an Airman First Class and was part of the 4080th Strategic Reconnaissance Wing, based out of Davis-Monthan Air Force Base in Arizona.

In August 1965, Salazar responded to an intense mortar and artillery attack. Amid the bombardment, he discovered the command post gate unguarded and found two injured officers beyond it. He successfully evacuated his commander to a bunker but was thrown to the tarmac by a mortar explosion while attempting to rescue the second officer. Regaining consciousness, he completed the rescue and secured classified materials before encountering a silhouetted figure wearing a traditional Vietnamese nón lá. Preparing to engage, he hesitated upon recognizing the figure as a young boy. A subsequent flare revealed that the boy had disappeared.

Following the battle, Salazar came upon the remains of the same boy and another child in a damaged building, an experience that profoundly affected him. He later struggled with post-traumatic stress disorder (PTSD) and retired from the Air Force in 1976. Salazar faced challenges in obtaining veterans' benefits for his combat-related injuries. During his time in the Air Force, Salazar suffered from severe back and neck pain and mysterious skin patterns appeared on his hands, arms, and shoulders. Military doctors treated him, found nothing wrong, and assigned him light duty. Later, Salazar discovered he had fractured his spine. Despite the pain, he juggled three jobs to support his wife, Maria, and their six children. He worked as a military administrative assistant, a furniture salesman, and a maintenance worker at officers' clubs.

Salazar later turned to Tejano music and performed in local clubs with his conjunto band. He was later scouted by KUKA to be their disc jockey. The station became the top-rated radio station in San Antonio, Texas. Salazar was eventually fired around Christmas Day and was later hired at KEDA. While working at KEDA, Salazar released his debut album, Para Usted, Canta Placido Salazar, which sold modestly according to the San Antonio Express-News, and produced his television show, The Placido Salazar Show on QVC which ran for 15 years. Salazar began writing songs, composing over 300 recordings, some of which were recorded by La Mafia, Los Dos Gilbertos, and Flaco Jimenez, among others.

Salazar reapplied for veteran benefits in 2005, ultimately receiving support for PTSD. In March 2008, Salazar was caught on live TV confronting then-presidential candidate Barack Obama on the need to build a veterans' hospital in the Rio Grande Valley. The hospital would ensure that the region's more than 120,000 veterans would not have to travel 500 miles to San Antonio for medical care. In 2013, he was awarded the Purple Heart and the Bronze Star with Valor for his heroism. During the awards ceremony, retired Col. Colin Chauret, Salazar's former commander at Randolph, pinned the medals onto his uniform and told Salazar "they don't come for free; people have to make sacrifices. I am honored to pin the medals."

Salazar has since dedicated himself to supporting fellow veterans, citing the camaraderie of military service and the values he instilled during his upbringing in La Villa, Texas. His son Eddie Salazar entered law enforcement while his other son Eduardo Salazar joined the Bexar County Sheriff's Department. Salazar was inducted into the Tejano Roots Hall of Fame and the San Antonio Radio Hall of Fame. He was awarded the Tejano Music Award for Lifetime Achievement at the 2024 Tejano Music Awards. Salazar currently works as an announcer for KLMO-FM.

== Works cited ==
- Medina, John Henry (October 30, 2024). "Tejano Music Awards to Honor Placido Salazar with Lifetime Achievement Award". Tejano Nation. Archived from the original on January 7, 2025.
- Salinas, Alex (February 26, 2013). "Vietnam War vet receives Bronze Star". AF.mil. Archived from the original on January 7, 2025.
- Wilson, Mark D. (October 26, 2015). "SAPD spokesman eyeing run for Bexar County Sheriff". San Antonio Express-News. Archived from the original on January 7, 2025.
- Littles, Wanda Thomas (May 7, 2013). "Salazar receives Bronze Star 48 years after Vietnam tour". San Antonio Express-News. Archived from the original on January 7, 2025.
- Davis, Vincent T. (November 11, 2014). "Vietnam veteran recounts struggles to get help". San Antonio Express-News. Archived from the original on January 7, 2025.
