= Consuelo Silva =

Chelo (Consuelo Silva; 25 August 1922 – 2 April 1988) was a popular singer of Mexican bolero music who had a long career, spanning from the 1930s to the 1980s. She belongs to the Golden Age of Mexican cinema.

== Early life ==
She was born in Brownsville, Texas, on August 25, 1922, the eldest of seven children. As a teenager, Silva performed with her school and church, eventually performing locally with a local group, Tito Crixell Orchestra.

== Career ==
Silva became popular in Brownsville and was invited to perform on Americo Paredes' radio show. She continued to perform on the radio, as well as at the Continental Club in Corpus Christi, Texas, gaining popularity quickly through her spin on the romantic song style. She signed to Falcon Records in 1952, and her popularity rose throughout the Southwest. Peerless Records began to distribute her recordings in Mexico and her fame became international. She signed to Columbia Records in 1955. Usually accompanied by a guitar trio, she became known as "La Reina de Los Boleros". She toured the United States, Mexico and South America until the 1980s.

She performed with some of the great stars of her time, including José Alfredo Jiménez, Javier Solís and Lola Beltrán.

== Personal life ==
Silva and Paredes were married in 1939, shortly after they had met on his radio show. They were divorced after being married for a few years and had a son, Americo Paredes Jr., during their marriage. Silva later married Leopoldo Morales Perez, with whom she had a daughter, Garnette Perez, and two sons, Rene and Les Perez.

Silva was inducted the Tejano R.O.O.T.S. Hall of Fame in 2004. She was also inducted into the South Texas Music Walk of Fame.

Silva died of cancer on April 2, 1988, in Corpus Christi, Texas.

== Hits ==
Among her most popular hits are "Está Sellado", "Sabes de Qué Tengo Ganas" "Amor Aventurero" and "Soy Bohemia".
