= Música Norteña: Mexican Migrants Creating a Nation Between Nations =

2009 book by Cathy Ragland

Música Norteña: Mexican Migrants Creating a Nation Between Nations is a 2009 book by Cathy Ragland, published by Temple University Press. It discusses norteña music as practiced in the United States. The author stated that the music contributed to a newly formed Mexico-based identity of mexicanidad.

According to Hazel Marsh of University of East Anglia, it is an "ethnomusicological analysis", and was the first book to examine in detail the musical genre.

== Background ==
Ragland had talked to various norteña-related figures and had been involved in the study of that field for a period. She conducted research in the United States and Mexico, with such research taking ten years. In Mexico she did research in Nuevo Leon and Tamaulipas. In the United States she did her research in New York, Texas, and Washington.

== Contents ==
The book is arranged in a "roughly chronological" order, according to Ruth Hellier-Tinoco of the University of California, Santa Barbara. There is an introduction before the five chapters.

Corridos and their continuity with norteña are discussed in chapter 1, along with how norteña differs from tejano music and conjunto. The history of norteña is in Chapter 2. The 1940s–1960s arrival of Mexicans into the United States and how that influenced the course of norteña is in Chapter 3. How post-1964 illegal immigration contributed to norteña and Ramón Ayala's role in the genre are documented in Chapter 4. Los Tigres del Norte is in Chapter 5. There is a conclusion at the end.

It also includes transcribed versions of music, lyrics, and photographs of musicians.

== Reception ==
Hellier-Tinoco gave the book a positive review, calling it a "significant addition" to its field.

Maria Herrera-Sobek of University of California, Santa Barbara stated that overall "the book is well done and is an excellent contribution" to its field.

Reviewer Alejandro Madrid stated the author did a "wonderful job".

Marsh described the book as "a rich and fascinating study" of its subject.

Brenda M. Romero of the University of Colorado at Boulder stated it "is a valuable new resource".

Guadalupe San Miguel of the University of Houston stated that this book "is an interesting book with some fascinating insights." However, he criticized the author's understanding of norteño music as being "too limited" and her definition of it as being "too broad and non-inclusive of border developments". San Miguel stated that the author "conflates regions, experiences, and musical styles" and did not sufficiently differentiate between the various genres of music along the U.S. Mexican border.
