= Falcon Records (Texas) =

Record company from Texas between the 1940s and 1990s

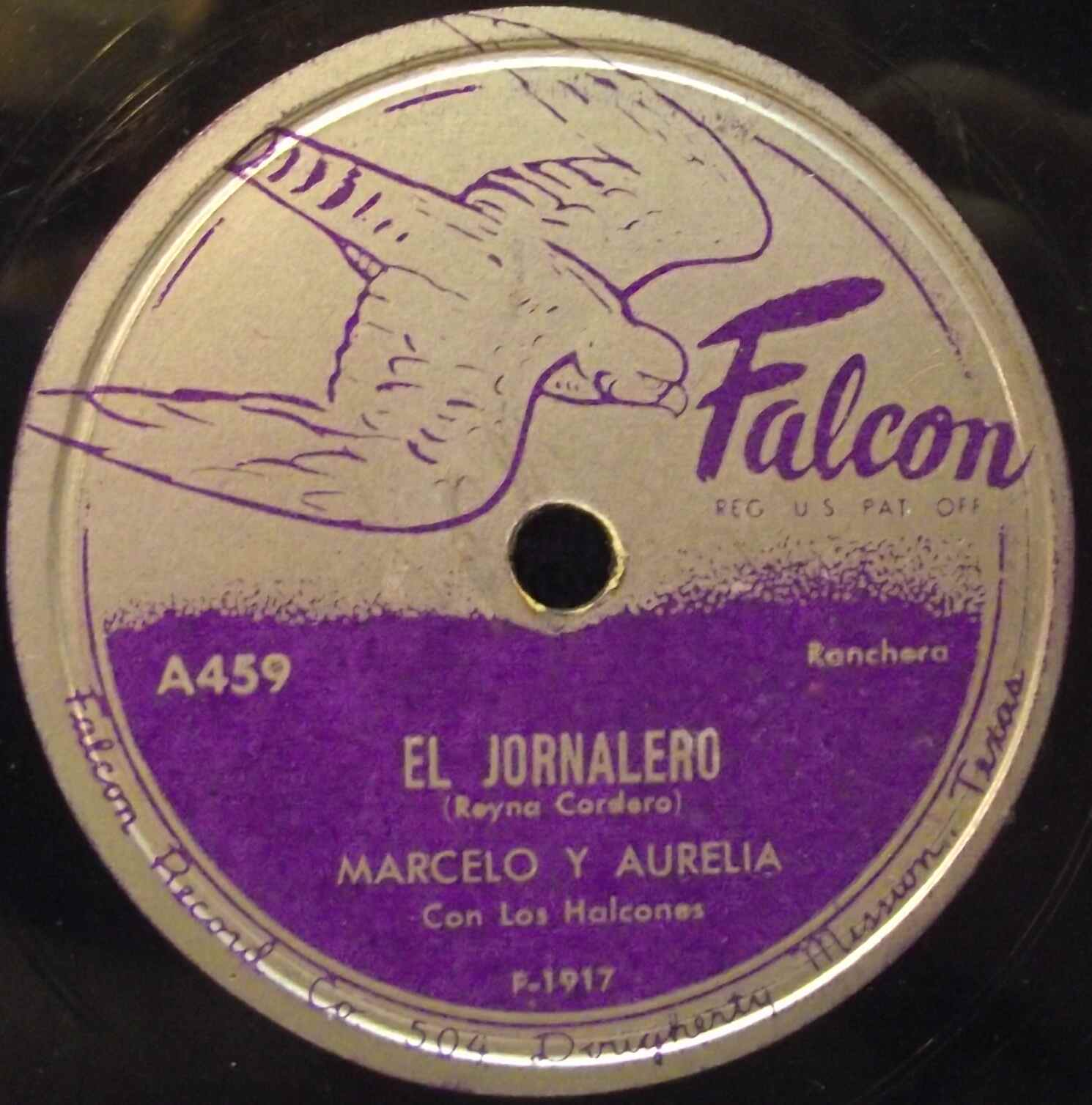
- Falcon 78rpm A459, "El Jornalero" by Marcelo y Aurelia
- Founded: 1948
- Founder: Arnaldo Ramirez
- Status: Defunct
- Genre: Tejano
- Country of origin: United States
- Location: McAllen, Texas, United States

Falcon Records was a record label from McAllen, Texas, that was instrumental in the establishment of tejano as a widespread musical style. Founded in 1948 by Arnaldo Ramirez, the label specialized in the rural norteño music which had been abandoned by the major labels. By the early 1960s it was clearly the leading tejano music label. Falcon was responsible for numerous recordings by Los Alegres de Terán, Chelo Silva, René y René, Roberto Pulido, and many other tejano and norteño artists of significance. Falcon's product gained international exposure through the syndicated television program Fanfarria Falcon. The label's activities wound down around 1990, and the recordings were purchased by EMI. The company's historical artifacts are held at the Jernigan Library at Texas A&M University–Kingsville.

== History ==
Falcon's founder Arnaldo Ramirez (1918–1993) became interested in the entertainment industry at an early age. He learned to become a master of ceremonies, and was a radio DJ in Harlingen, Texas, by the early 1940s. He concentrated on Spanish music, buying radio hours on stations in such towns as McAllen, Texas, and Reynosa, Mexico. He then subcontracted some of his radio time to other disc jockeys, and eventually acquired funds enough to open his own recording studio.

When his main station, XWAW, ceased operations as a border blaster, Ramirez came to realize there was a sizable audience for the music he was promoting. He set up a recording studio in McAllen, Texas, which was just a few miles from the Mexican border. Early recordings were often interrupted by traffic noise. Ramirez found this necessary as major labels such as RCA Victor, who had previously released numerous recording catering to the Chicano audience, left the genre as a result of World War II shellac rationing and did not resume recording regional music, concentrating instead on larger Hispanic markets in major metropolitan areas such as Mexico City. Ramirez's first record label was Mira, started in 1947 which specialized in Afro-Cuban music. The label started a "Mexican Series" featuring Pedro Ayala. The next year, 1948, Ramirez started Falcon records which featured Tejano culture.

Falcon was dedicated to producing Spanish music, and in particular conjunto Tex-Mex music. Falcon concentrated artists from the local area, including from both sides of the United States-Mexican border, and many of them were undocumented migrants who moved back and forth across. These artists would often pick cotton by day, and make music at night. After signing Los Alegres de Terán, Ramirez recognized conjunto as a powerful cultural development, and actively sought to find other artists in that genre. Falcon was one of the few local record labels catering to Spanish-speaking audiences that expanded beyond local distribution. Ramirez returned to Afro-Cuban music in 1952 when Orquesta Falcon was formed, a unit which eventually toured Cuba. In the 1950s the label was flourishing financially, but Ramirez's knowledge of copyright was insufficient and he found himself in some legal trouble.

In 1954 the label signed Chelo Silva, a bolero singer whose style was a departure from the accordion-based groups for which Falcon was most known. Her Falcon recordings were distributed by Peerless Records in Mexico.

In the early 1960s Ideal Records became moribund, and Falcon became the undisputed leader of tejano music labels. He started a Spanish-language musical television program named Fanfarria Falcon which was created to promote Falcon artists, but consequently gave Tejano artists heretofore unknown national and international exposure. This syndicated program aired from 1964 to 1981 on 214 stations within the United States including the major Chicago and Los Angeles markets, and was also available in much of Latin America. Despite this, the Falcon experienced diminishing profitability and Ramirez sold Falcon to California-based CENTRON in the 1960s. CENTRON was unsuccessful with the venture, and subsequently returned Falcon to the Ramirez family. Arnaldo Ramirez's son Arnaldo Jr. became an executive of the company. The operation grew to include offices and facilities in Austin, Chicago, Denver, Los Angeles, and San Antonio.

Falcon recorded René y René after their 1964 hit "Angelito". Two unsuccessful singles released, and the remaining recordings were shelved. Recently returned from military duty, Arnaldo Jr. listened to the tape of the unreleased song "Lo Mucho Que Te Quiero" and decided to release it. The recording was Falcon's most successful recording selling more than four million copies. However, the record was released nationally on the White Whale label as Falcon's distribution did not reach English-speaking audiences.

Falcon signed Roberto Pulido y Los Clásicos in 1976, a move which proved highly beneficial to both parties. It became Falcon's best selling group in the 1980s, to the point that Ramirez called them his "bread and butter". The 1982 devaluation of the Mexican peso affected sales.

Falcon's recordings were sold to the Mexican branch of EMI sometime around 1990.

== Name ==
Ramirez named his company Falcon because he liked the action, aggression, appearance, speed and strength represented by that genus of bird. He also thought that the name sounded similar in both English and Spanish.

== Legacy ==
Falcon's studio location was an optimal spot to record rural norteño music, which appealed to both the working class Hispanic population, as well as to more affluent members of the ethnicity who were seeking nostalgia. This was in contrast to their main competitor Ideal Records, who recorded a more urban, "sophisticated" brand of tejano music called conjunto that appealed to the bilingual and the educated.

One of the first artists to sign to Falcon was Los Alegres de Terán, who continued to record for Falcon for more than 30 years. The group's recordings played a crucial role for norteña music, as their music became popular throughout Mexico. Lydia Mendoza and her family made numerous recordings for Falcon between August 1950 until at least 1968.

The exposure that resulted from Falcon's publicity enabled several Texas orquestras to not only survive but flourish, and a vibrant orquestra ballroom scene arose as a result, not only in Texas but across the Midwest. For many of its artists, Falcon provided an entry point towards recording with much larger record companies.

In 1974 Falcon released Tortilla Factory's self-titled LP. This album was noted for fusing traditional polka-rancheras with jazz phrasing and improvisation, an important innovation within the la Onda movement.

Ramirez disparaged some of his own product as una porqueria because of its origins among the very poorest classes. However, he also valued his product a culturally important to the working class, and as a tool to channel ideological currents.

In 1994 numerous historical artifacts from the Falcon operation were acquired by the South Texas Archives of the Jernigan Library at Texas A&M University–Kingsville. An exhibit featuring these artifacts was on display at the library in April and May 1996.

== Production details ==
Falcon's records were pressed by Tanner and Texas from inception for twenty five years. When the Tanner pressing plant shut down in 1974, Falcon acquired its own pressing equipment and planned to print and manufacture record jackets in-house. Royalco International Corporation was formed to be the distribution channel for Falcon. Falcon Recording Company was a directly related but separate company that did the actual recording. This studio was also open for public use. Falcon's recordings were distributed throughout Latin and South America, but usually did not appear there on the Falcon label per se as governments required products manufactured by local industry. Instead, Falcons recordings would appear on local labels and Falcon would receive royalties and production credit. It was typical that Falcon would send out around 40 promotional records to radio stations for a release.

== Artists ==
- Alonzo y Sus Rancheros
- Pedro Ayala
- Los Alegres de Terán
- Kris Bravo
- Ray Camacho and the Teardrops
- Country Roland
- Los Cuatitos Cantu
- Hermanas Degollado
- Los Dinos
- Los Donneños
- Las Dos Marías
- Dueto Estrella
- Freddy Fender
- Juanita García
- Las Hermanas Gongora
- Freddie Gomez
- Wally Gonzales
- Manuel Guerrero
- Delia Gutiérrez
- Eugenio Gutiérrez
- Carlos Guzmán
- Manuel Hernandez and his orchestra
- Esteban Jordan
- Josue
- Narciso Martínez
- Hermanas Mendoza
- Lydia Mendoza
- Carlos Miranda
- Las Norteñitas
- Mike Ornelas
- Orquesta Falcon
- Gilberto Perez
- Roberto Pulido
- René y René
- Narciso Reyes
- Cornelio Reyna
- Rigoberto Rosales
- Rosita y Aurelia
- Hermanas Segovia
- Chelo Silva
- Pedro y Malena Valdez, Dueto Falcon
- Ruben Vela
- Victor y Lolita
- Beto Villa

== Subsidiaries ==
By the 1980s, Falcon was running several subsidiary labels, which included:

- ARV International
- Bego Records (purchased)
- CR Records
- El Pato
- Impacto
- Bronco (Falcon's budget label)

At its peak, there were nine subsidiary labels of Falcon.
