= Cornelio Reyna =

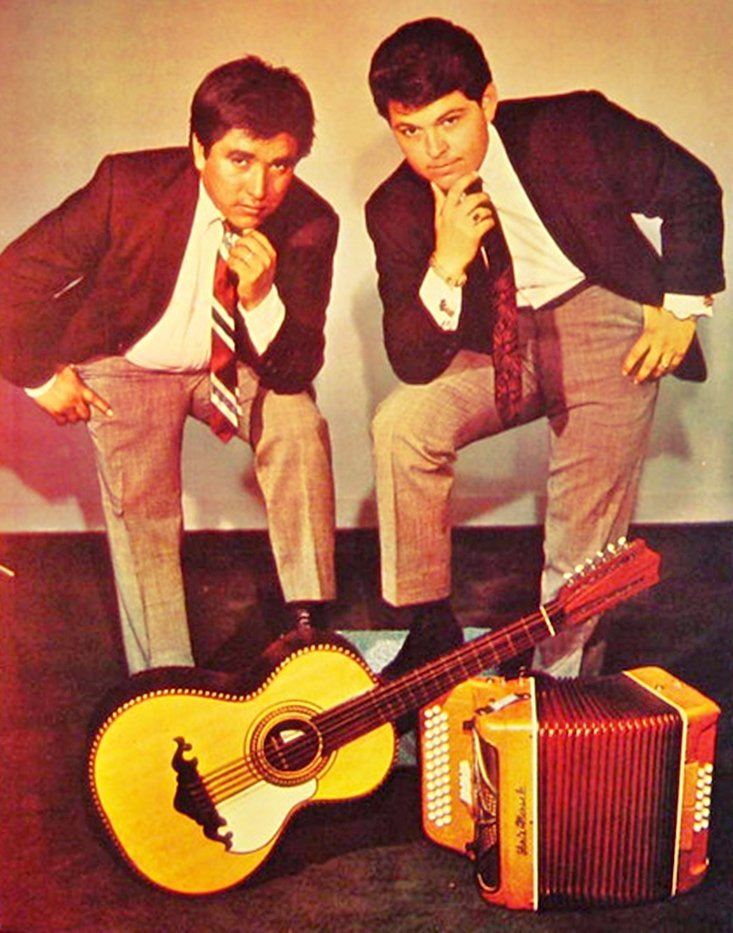
- Cornelio Reyna (left) and Ramón Ayala from the musical duo, Los Relámpagos del Norte
- Born: Cornelio Reyna Cisneros; September 15, 1940; Parras De La Fuente, Coahuila, Mexico
- Died: January 22, 1997 (aged 56); Mexico City, Mexico
- Occupations: Singer; songwriter; record producer; actor
- Years active: 1961–1997
- Spouses: Mercedes Castro (m. ?–?); Marita (m. ?–?)
- Musical career
- Genres: Norteño; Mariachi; Ranchera
- Instruments: Vocals; Bajo sexto
- Labels: Bego; Trebol
- Formerly of: Los Relámpagos del Norte

Cornelio Reyna Cisneros (September 16, 1940 – January 22, 1997) was a Mexican singer, composer, bajo sextist and actor. He made over 60 recordings of Norteño and Mariachi music. He was the lead vocalist for the group "Los Relámpagos del Norte" (The Lightning Bolts of The North). Reyna was considered a native of the city of Reynosa, Tamaulipas due to his great affection for the city and that his career grew there. As an actor, Reyna appeared in some 30 films about Mexican popular culture.

== Life and career ==
Reyna was born in Notillas Coahuila, Mexico. His parents were María Martínez Cisneros and Román Medellín Reyna. As a teenager, Reyna lived in the city of Monterrey, Nuevo León, and shortly thereafter, moved to Houston, Texas, where he worked as a bricklayer. Later, in Saltillo, Coahuila, Reyna began his musical career by writing songs, singing, and playing the bajo sexto (very similar to a twelve-string guitar)..

In 1957, along with Juan Peña, Cornelio formed the duet Dueto Carta Blanca, frequenting the Cadillac Bar, where many musicians from the region of northern Tamaulipas and southern Texas met. From there, they went out to play at different nightclubs in Reynosa, but Cornelio's goal was to do it professionally, taking advantage of his great ability to perform the bajo sexto.

In 1961, into the same Cadillac Bar walked in a young man named Ramón Covarrubias, who would become famous as Ramón Ayala. He had arrived seeking work as a shoe shiner, but his real skills were elsewhere. Over time, Ramón demonstrated his masterful talent as an accordionist. One day, when Juan Peña decided to take leave from the Dueto Carta Blanca, they invited Ramón to join and present himself as the new companion to Cornelio.

Cornelio and Ramón changed their name to Los Relámpagos del Norte ("The Lightning Bolts of the North" in Spanish), Ramón excelling with his accordion and Cornelio with his Bajo Sexto. In addition, Cornelio gained recognition as the fine songwriter-composer of many of the songs they played.

The new duet toured the bars of Reynosa, until in 1963, a representative of Bego Records offered to record their first album, which produced what would be their first big hit: "Ya No Llores" ("Don't Cry Any More"). From there, their new-found fame slowly spread over northern Mexico and southern Texas with songs like: "Mil Noches", "Tu Traición", "Me Caí de la Nube", "Lágrimas de mi Barrio", "Mil Besos", "Si Tu Supieras", among many others.

The peculiar vocal quality of Cornelio's delivery and the speed with which Ramón played the accordion marked a new style in Norteña music, where to this day groups and soloists continue to emerge, utilizing as a musical foundation the particular rhythms and style initiated by "Los Relámpagos"...The Lightning Bolts from The North.

In 1971, Cornelio and Ramón decided to go their separate ways. Cornelio moved to Mexico City, recording an LP with mariachi, which at that point represented one of his most ambitious projects. Later, he began to parlay his prosperous musical career with the cinema, where he performed as an actor and frequently interpreted the songs he created, such as: "Lágrimas de mi barrio", "Me Sacaron del Tenampa", "Me Caíste del Cielo", among others. Cornelio recorded 60 albums and appeared in some 30 films, many of which included his songs, under the production and direction of Rubén Galindo. He a good measure of success in his recordings with mariachi, but his affection by the Norteña music never waned and he alternated his recordings between these two styles.

Throughout his life he maintained contact with his former musical partner, Ramón Ayala, who had formed the group Los Bravos del Norte. There were many occasions when Cornelio appeared on stage to once again perform with Ramón the well-known hits of their Lightning Bolts From the North years.

The last tour he made was in 1996, appearing in several cities in the United States from June to December 24, 1996. He died less than a month later.

Cornelio Reyna died on January 22, 1997, in Mexico City, due to complications from a stomach ulcer. His body was moved to the Plaza Garibaldi, where he was paid tribute. Later, his remains were transported to Reynosa, Tamaulipas, where a large and profoundly sad crowd awaited his arrival. Cornelio was still relatively young, and although his fame was no longer the same as it had been a few years prior, in the southern region of Texas and northeast of Mexico he continued to have a large and faithful following.

Although Reyna died at a young age, he was able to produce many lasting, now iconic hits. All this success had begun with Los Relámpagos del Norte in 1963, with their eponymous hit song, "Ya No Llores". More recently, Ramon Ayala included it in his latest CD, also titled "Ya No Llores".

== Discography ==
- El Bohemio De La Cancion Ranchera (1971)
- Echale Sentimento... Cornelio (1971)
- Cornelio Reyna (1972)
- Voz Y Temperamento (1973)
- Regresa Cornelio Y Su Conjunto (1974)
- Con El Mariachi Oro y Plata De José Chavez (1975)
- Cornelio Reyna (1975)
- Al Calor De Las Copas (1977)
- El Gallero Del Pueblo (1980)
- Cornelio Reyna (1984)
- Eres Igual Que El Dinero (1986)
- Cornelio Reyna Con Tambora (1988)
- Cornelio Reyna (1990)

== Filmography ==
- El ojo de vidrio (1969)
- Valente Quintero (1973)
- La yegua colorada (1973)
- Lágrimas de mi barrio (1973)
- Me caí de la nube (1974)
- El hijo de los pobres (1975)
- El andariego (1978)
- El llanto de los pobres (1978)
- De Cocula es el mariachi (1978)
- El norteño enamorado (1979)
- Contrabando por amor (1980)
- El ladrón fenomeno (1980)
- Maldita miseria (1983)
- La esperanza de los pobres (1983)
