= Los Alegres de Terán =

Mexican norteño music duo

- Origin: General Terán, Nuevo Leon, Mexico
- Genres: Norteño
- Years active: 1948-1988
- Labels: Falcon, Del Valle, Orfeo, CBS, Harmony

Los Alegres de Terán were a Mexican norteño band. They were formed in Nuevo León when Eugenio Abrego and Tomas Ortiz met in a club in the mid-1940s focusing their activities around the area of Monterrey, Reynosa, and finally settling in McAllen, Texas. Ortiz was the lead singer and played the bajo sexto, while Abrego was second voice and played the accordion.

Beginning with their first record in 1948, "Corrido de Pepito", Los Alegres de Terán were pioneers of norteño style duets singing corridos, rancheras and norteño songs. Their first record was for Falcon Records. Soon they recorded for Orfeo Records of Mexico, which brought them wider recognition as that label heavily promoted them in Mexico City and Monterrey. They recorded more albums and had hits with many songs, including "Carta Jugada", "Alma Enamorada", and "Entre Copa y Copa". Later they would record for the Mexican branch of Columbia Records and for Del Valle Records. The duo also took part in cross-marketing moves, including a spot on the bill in the first Polka Festival which was held in Chicago in the mid-1960s. The group also had an appearance in several films, including Pueblito, a 1961 melodrama directed by Emilio Fernandez.

Before becoming Los Alegres de Terán, Tomás Ortiz and Eugenio Abrego performed separately with Ramiro Cavazos from Los Donneños, and recorded with Cavazos on several 78s for the Orfeo label, billing themselves as 'Ortiz y Cavazos con el Dueto Abrego'.

Los Alegres de Terán were inducted into the Tejano Conjunto Hall of Fame in 1983. Abrego died five years later.

When Abrego died, Tomas Ortiz was in search for a new singing partner. He met the Delgadillo brothers. Francisco Delgadillo and Samuel Delgadillo were not only brothers they played together for many years under a different group name known as Los Hermanos Delgadillo de Zacatecas. The Brothers joined Tomas and they worked as a group as Los Alegres De Terán. Francisco Delgadillo sang songs with Tomas and Samuel played the accordion. Together they traveled in the US and Mexico to hold concerts and benefit concerts, recorded songs as Los Alegres de Terán such as the CD by the name of "Que Chulada de Mujer." They were successful as a group. Tomas Ortiz died in November 2007. Francisco Delgadillo died in July 2013.

== See also ==
- Norteño (music)
- Los Donneños
