= Pedro Ayala =

Mexican-American musician and songwriter (1911-1990)

- Born: Pedro Ayala; June 29, 1911; General Terán, Nuevo León, Mexico
- Died: December 1, 1990 (aged 79) South Texas
- Genres: Conjunto
- Instrument: accordion
- Years active: 1935–1989
- Labels: Arhoolie Records, Bego Records, DiscOlando Records, Eco Records, El Pato Records, Falcon Records, Folklyric Records, Ideal Record, Oro Records, RyN Records

Pedro Ayala (June 29, 1911 – December 1, 1990), called "El Monarca del Acordeón", was a Mexican accordionist and songwriter from General Terán, Nuevo León, Mexico. Pedro Ayala was a pioneer of conjunto music with his distinctive accordion playing, receiving a National Heritage Fellowship from the National Endowment for the Arts for his contribution to conjunto and folk music.

== Early life ==
Ayala, the son of musician Emilio Ayala, began playing the accordion when he was 5 years old. His family migrated to the United States when Pedro was about eight years old, settling in the town of Donna, Texas in the Rio Grande Valley and working as farm laborers. At age ten, he began to accompany his father on gigs for local dances, playing the tambora (drum). By age fourteen, Pedro had learned the two-row button accordion, guitar and was playing with one of his favorite accordionists, Chon Alaniz.

== Career ==
Ayala began his professional career in 1935, and decided to concentrate on the accordion as his primary instrument. He played music while continuing to work on farms. In the 1940s and 1950s, Ayala was a well-respected performer among working-class Mexican Americans living in Texas, earning the title "El Monarca del Acordeon" (Monarch of the Accordion). In 1947, he recorded with a new record label named Mira in McAllen, Texas. Mira later became Falcon Records, a very successful Chicano recording company. Over the course of his career, Ayala made 10 albums and numerous 78- and 45-rpm recordings that included polkas, chotes, valses, and redovas.

Throughout his career, Ayala remained true to the stylistic core of conjunto music, but also added innovations such as incorporating the toloche (stand-up bass) to the ensemble. He was also regarded as a songwriter with a distinctive style of composition.

In 1957 his sons Ramon Ayala, and Pedro Ayala Jr. (Quito) joined his group Pedro Ayala y su Conjunto. By 1963 Pedro Ayala's youngest son Emilio joined the group renaming the group to Pedro Ayala El Monarca del Acordeón y Los Hermanos Ayala touring the entire United States for the next several years.

== Personal life ==
Pedro Ayala married Esperanza Benitez in 1935. They had a total of nine children three of which also played instruments. Hector Ayala, Elia Ayala, Pedro Ayala Jr., Anita Ayala, Ramon Ayala, Pedro Ayala Jr. (Quito), Olga Ayala, Magdalena Ayala, and Emilio Ayala.

== Awards and honors ==
- Ayala was a recipient of a 1988 National Heritage Fellowship awarded by the National Endowment for the Arts, which is the United States government's highest honor in the folk and traditional arts.
- He was given a Texas flag that flew over the state capitol in Austin, Texas by Governor Ann Richards.
- Pedro Ayala y Los Hermanos Ayala were invited to perform at the White House in Washington, D.C. by the Smithsonian Institution. The entire event was documented on video.
- Ayala was inducted into the Tejano R.O.O.T.S. Hall of Fame in 2004.
