= Ventura Alonzo =

American musician

Ventura Martínez Alonzo (December 30, 1904 – December 14, 2000) was a Mexican-born American musician. She was known as the "Queen of the Accordion".

She was born Ventura Martínez in Matamoros and moved to Brownsville, Texas with her family in 1909. Her father taught her to play the piano. The family lived in Kingsville for several years before moving to Houston in 1917. Alonzo married a man named Gallegos. Together, they had 3 sons. The couple later divorced and she married Frank Alonzo in 1931. The couple formed a group known as Alonzo y Sus Rancheros; she played accordion and piano and was lead vocalist. They recorded for Falcon Records and a number of other record labels. After World War II, the group changed its name to Alonzo y su Orquesta; they performed throughout Texas. In 1956, the couple opened the La Terraza ballroom in Houston, catering to customers of Mexican descent. They retired from performing in 1969.

In 2002, she was inducted into the Tejano R.O.O.T.S. Hall of Fame.

== Professional accomplishments ==
As an accomplished accordionist, Alonzo has been identified as one of the few instrumentalists in commercial orquestas, and one of the few women in a leadership position in her band Alonzo y Sus Rancheros.

== Legacy ==
According to historian Deborah Vargas, Alonzo has often been noted as Houston's first lady of accordion.
