= Los Relámpagos del Norte =

Mexican musical duo

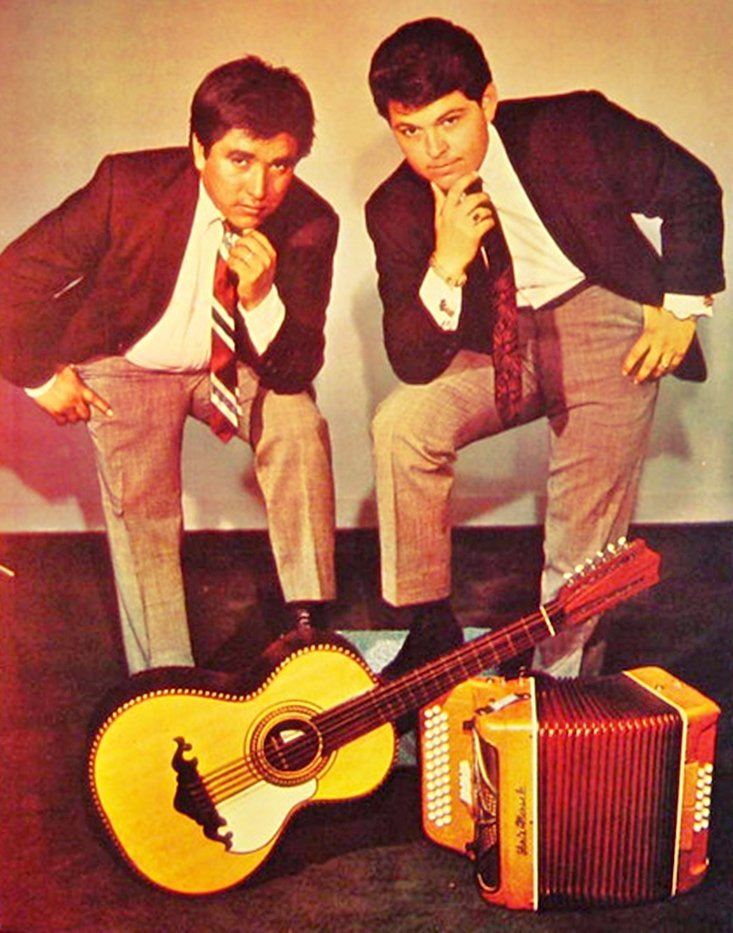
- Los Relámpagos del Norte in the 1960s

Background information
- Origin: Reynosa, Tamaulipas, Mexico
- Genres: Norteño
- Years active: 1963–1971; 1995–1997
- Labels: Bego Records; Orfeón
- Past members: Ramón Ayala; Cornelio Reyna

Los Relámpagos del Norte were a Mexican norteño duo formed in the early 1960s by Cornelio Reyna and Ramón Ayala. Cornelio Reyna was the lead singer and bajo sexto player, while Ramon Ayala was the background vocalist and the accordion player. After successful careers together, Cornelio and Ramon parted ways in the early 1970s. They later reunited in 1995 to record a live album which was successful among their core audience.

This band is respected in the norteño music world and is one of the founding bands for the genre. Servando Cano, the representative of Los Relampagos Del Norte currently represents various bands of similar style. The duo had plans to record a new album, but plans were cut short when Cornelio Reyna died.

== History ==
=== Early years ===
In the early 1960s, Ramón Ayala met Cornelio Reyna and after seeing Ayala's skills at playing the accordion, Cornelio decided to form the duo known as Los Relámpagos del Norte. In 1963, they recorded their first hit, "Ya No Llores", and eventually recorded 20 albums. In 1969, they appeared in the film starring Antonio Aguilar called, "El ojo de vidrio", and they performed their hit, "Hay Ojitos". The band split up in 1971.

=== Later years ===
In 1995, Ramón Ayala and Cornelio Reyna reunited and recorded and released the album, "Juntos Para Siempre".

== Discography ==
=== Albums ===
- Ya No Llores (1964)
- El Disco De Oro (1966)
- Estamos En Algo (1968)
- Con La Tinta De Mi Sangre (1968)
- Los Relámpagos del Norte Strike Again! (Vol. 3) (1969)
- Mas.....Con Los Relámpagos del Norte (1970)
- Los Relámpagos del Norte (1971)

=== Singles ===
- Por El Amor A Mi Madre (1970)
- Ya No Llores (1963)
- Hay Ojitos (1966)
- Devolución (1966)
