= Potente =

Potente is a surname. Notable people with the surname include:

- Franka Potente (born 1974), German actress
- Osvaldo Potente (born 1951), Argentine retired footballer
