= Los Donneños =

1940s Mexican Norteño duo

- Origin: Los Ramones, Nuevo Leon; General Terán, Nuevo Leon; Donna, Texas
- Genres: Norteño
- Years active: 1946-1994
- Label: Orfeo

Los Donneños were a 1940s Mexican Norteño duo formed by Ramiro Cavazos and Mario Montes and named after Donna, Texas. Cavazos was a native of Los Ramones, Nuevo León and Montes a native of General Terán, Nuevo León. Cavazos was the lead singer and played the bajo sexto, while Montes was second voice and played the accordion. On some recordings they were joined by a string bass player, Rafael Gaspar.

== Formation ==
Cavazos met Montes while working as a migrant laborer near Donna, Texas. They had been acquainted through their manual labor, but joined forces musically after Cavazos noticed Montes playing music by the side of the road. They formed a duet named after the Texas town, and continued to work as migrant laborers even after making records for Falcon Records and developing a following that spanned both sides of the United States-Mexican border. In the 1970s and 1980s Ramiro Cavazos had a record store on South 23rd Street in McAllen, Texas.

Cavazos also performed with Tomás Ortiz and Eugenio Abrego, who later became Los Alegres de Terán, and recorded with them on several 78s for the Orfeo label, billing themselves as 'Ortiz y Cavazos con el Dueto Abrego'.

== Later years ==
Montes died on 17 January 1994 and Cavazos continued performing with other accordionists, such as René Maciel, Juan Antonio Coronado, and Beto Espinosa, in several reincarnations of Los Donneños.

In 2007, at the age of 80, Cavazos was inducted to the Texas Conjunto Music Hall of Fame.

In 2010, Cavazos participated in a recording that brought together other veteran stars of the norteño genre, including Hector Montemayor, Lorenzo de Monteclaro, and Poncho Villagomez, calling themselves Los Amigos Desde el Rancho.

Cavazos died on 2 July 2026 at his home in McAllen, Texas, at the age of 99.

== Discography ==
- Campeones De La Frontera (1961)
- En El Corazon Se Siente (1973)

== See also ==
- Norteño (music)
- Los Alegres de Terán
