= Ramón Ayala =

Mexican accordion player-songwriter and accordion player

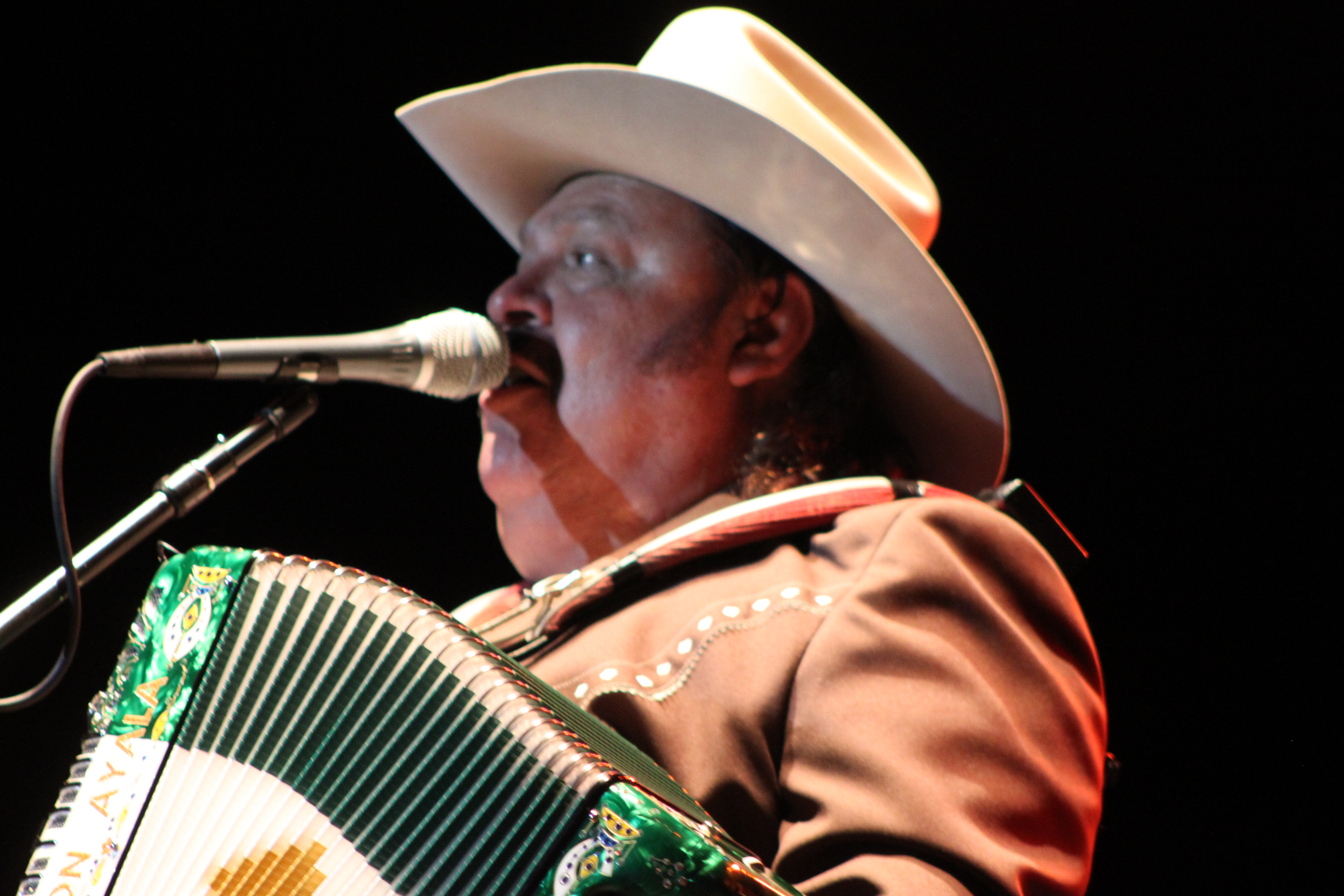
- Ayala in 2012
- Born: Ramón Covarrubias Garza; December 8, 1945 (age 80); Monterrey, Nuevo León, Mexico
- Occupations: Accordion player; songwriter; record producer
- Years active: 1963–present
- Spouse: Linda Ayala (m. 1970)
- Children: 4
- Relatives: Ramon Ayala Jr.
- Musical career
- Genre: Norteño
- Instrument: Acordion
- Labels: Tex-Mex; Freddie Records; Discos Larga Vida (under exclusive distribution by EMI Latin); Sony Music Entertainment Mexico
- Member of: Los Bravos del Norte
- Formerly of: Los Relámpagos del Norte

Ramón Covarrubias Garza (born 8 December 1945), known by his stage name Ramón Ayala, is a Mexican accordion player, composer and songwriter of Norteño music. He is also known as the "King of the Accordion".

== Awards and recognition ==
Ayala has won four Grammy Awards and received other recognitions for his career. In 2018 he received the keys to the city of Lynwood, CA.

== Discography ==
Studio albums (Ramón Ayala Y Sus Bravos Del Norte)

Studio albums under Discos Larga Vida

- Tus Baños De Pureza (1971)
- Ni Por Mil Puñados De Oro (1971)
- Ya Lo Pagarás Con Dios (1972)
- Corazón Vagabundo (1973)
- Hija De La Perdición (1973)
- ¿Por Qué? (1973)
- Tus Pucheros (1973)
- No Puedo Perdonarte (1974)
- Consuelo (1976)
- De La Pelicula: Dinastia De La Muerte (1976)
- Mujer Paseada (1977)
- Besos y Caricias (1977)
- No Vengas A Rogarme (1977)
- Corazón Partido (1978)
- Corridos Con Los Bravos Del Norte de Ramón Ayala, Vol. 1 (1978)
- Lo Mejor de Los Relámpagos (1978)
- Mi Piquito de Oro (1978)
- Puñalada Trapera (1979)
- Disco Polka (1979)
- Qué Suerte La Mía (1980)
- Paloma Negra (1980)
- Qué Bonita Primavera (1980)
- Tragos Amargos (1980)
- Con las Puertas En La Cara (1981)
- Amor Vaquero (1981)
- Recuérdame y Ven A Mí (1982)
- Remiten Con Cariño Una Carta (1982)
- Corazón Malo (1983)
- Mi Polvito de Oro (1983)
- Quisiera Tener Alas (1984)
- Entiérrenme Cantando (1984)
- Corridos Con Los Bravos Del Norte de Ramón Ayala, Vol. 2 (1985)
- Llegaste Tú (1985)
- Seis Rosas Amarillas (1985)
- Rinconcito En El Cielo (1985)
- Gaviota (1986)
- Te Vi Pasar (1987)
- Corridos Con Los Bravos Del Norte de Ramón Ayala, Vol. 3 (1988)
- Un Puño de Tierra (1988)
- Triste Recuerdo (Aferrado Por Ti) (1988)
- La Rama de Mezquite (1989)
- Mi Acordeón y Yo (1990)
- Pero Yo No La Conozco (1991)
- Corridos Con Los Bravos Del Norte de Ramón Ayala, Vol. 4: Gaviota Destrozada (1991)

Studio albums under Sony Music Entertainment Mexico

- Central Camionera (1992)
- El Acordeón De Oro (1993)
- Calles De Piedra (1994)
- Lágrimas (1995)
- Corridos Autenticos (1995)
- Arrancame El Corazón (1996)
- Herencia Musical: 15 Norteñas De Éxito (1997)
- Herencia Musical: 15 Boleros De Éxito (1997)
- En Las Alas De Un Ángel: Despedimos a Cornelio Reyna (1997)
- Casas de Madera (1998)
- Amigos Del Alma (2000)
- En Vivo... El Hombre y Su Musica (2001)
- La Calandria (2002)
- El Numero 100 (2002)
- El Invicto (40 Aniversario) (2003)
- Ya No Llores (2005)
- Cruzando Fronteras (2007)
- Almas Perdidas (2008)

Studio albums under other labels

- Amor Eterno (1974 - released under Tex-Mex)
- Vuelve (1975 - released under Aro Records)
- Dime Cuando Volveras (1994 - released under Freddie Records)
