= Norteño (music) =

Genre of Mexican music

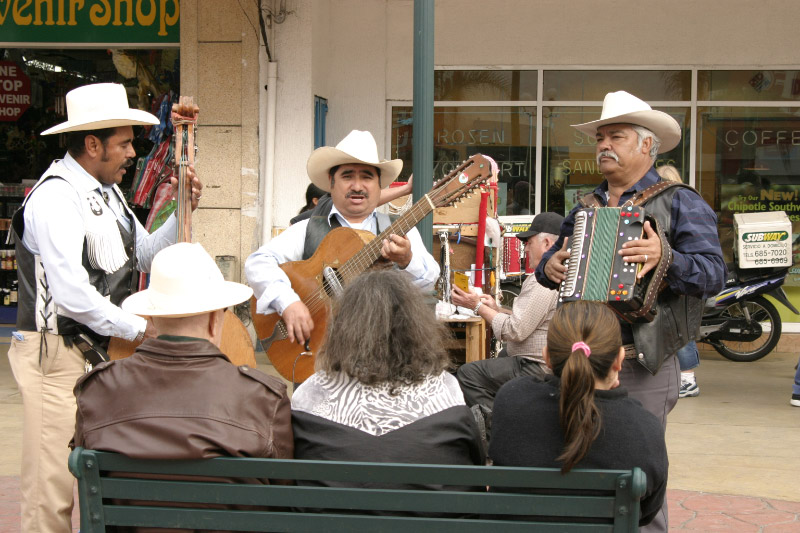
- A traditional Norteño ensemble: accordion, bajo sexto and tololoche
- Stylistic origins: from Mexico: Ranchera; cumbia; corrido; huapango; zapateado; from Europe: Polka; redowa; waltz; schottische
- Cultural origins: Late 19th Century, Northeastern Mexico

Subgenres
- Northeastern Norteño, Pacific Norteño, Norteño-Sax, Norteño-Banda

Regional scenes
- Mexico, United States, Guatemala, El Salvador, Colombia, Chile

Other topics
- New Mexico music; Tejano music; Regional Mexican music

Norteño or norteña (Spanish pronunciation: [noɾˈteɲo], northern), also música norteña, is a subgenre of regional Mexican music. The music is most often based on duple and triple metre and its lyrics often deal with socially relevant topics, although there are also many norteño love songs. The accordion and the bajo sexto are traditional norteño's most characteristic instruments.

The genre is popular in both Mexico and the United States, especially among the Mexican and Mexican-American community, and it has become popular in other Spanish-speaking countries as far away as Chile. Though originating from rural areas, norteño is popular in both rural and urban areas.

A conjunto norteño is a type of Mexican folk ensemble. It mostly includes button accordion, bajo sexto, electric bass or double bass, drums, and depending on the region, alto saxophone.

== Repertoire ==
The norteño repertoire covers canción ranchera, corrido, ballad, bolero, chotís, cumbia, huapango norteño, mazurka, polka, redowa and waltz.

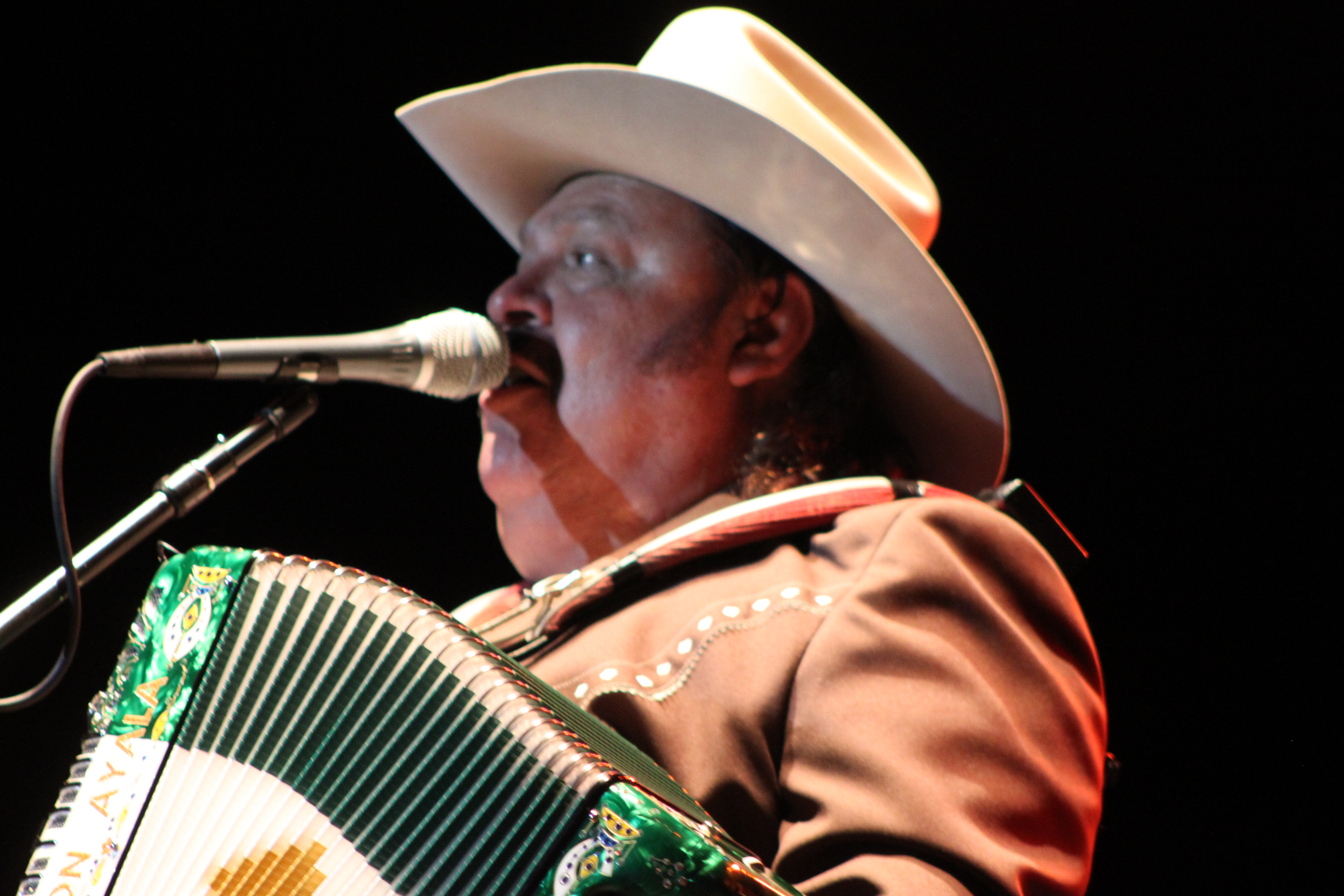
Ramon Ayala, a norteño musician known as the "King of the Accordion"

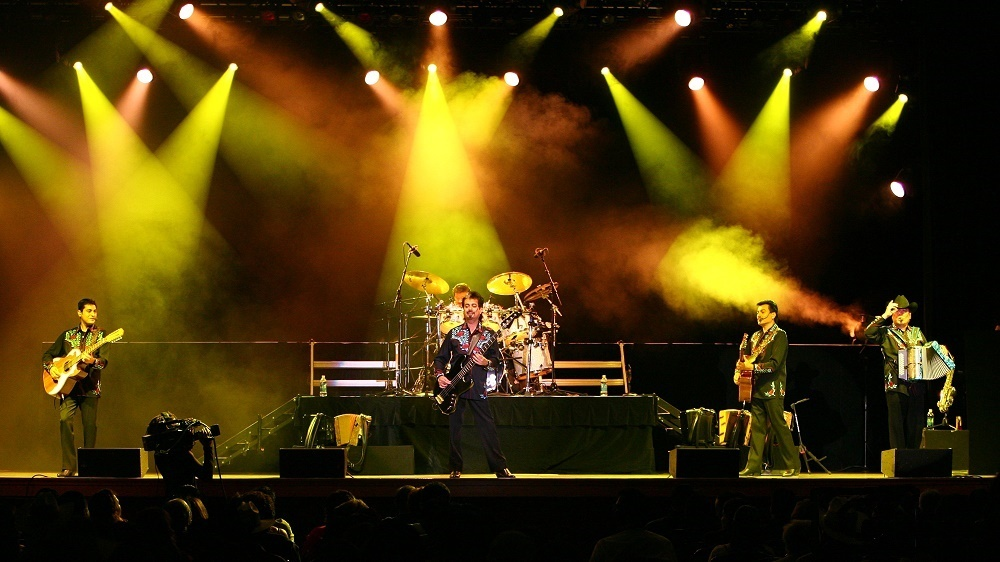
Los Tigres del Norte performing at a Californian casino in 2006

== History ==
=== Origins ===
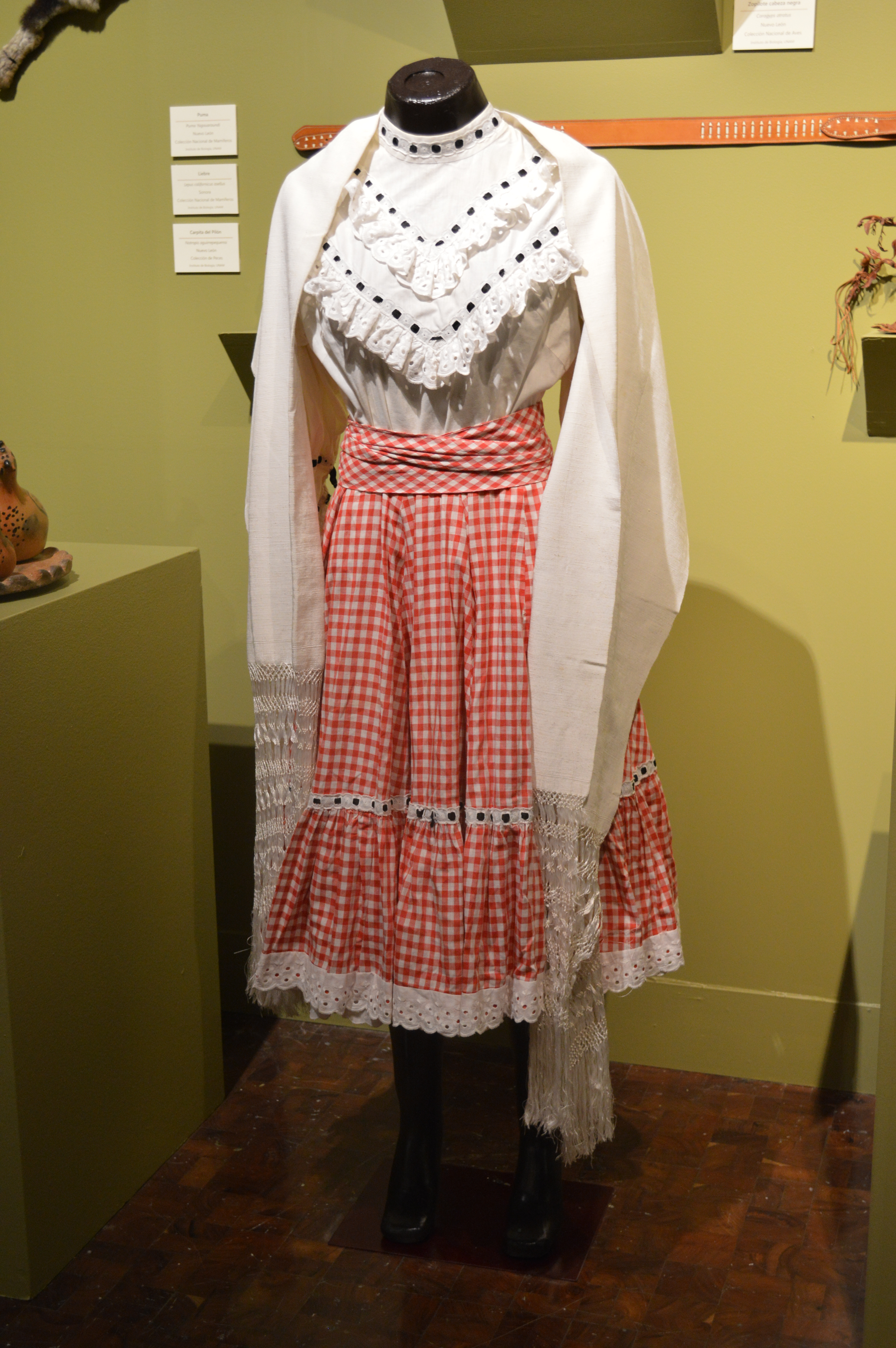
Dress to dance polka and redova from Nuevo León, displayed at the Museo de Arte Popular in Mexico City

Emperor Maximilian I brought Central European music to México during his reign (beginning 1863) in the Second Mexican Empire. By 1864, he had accumulated marching bands and musicians to entertain him. Norteño music developed from a blending of Mexican and Spanish oral and musical traditions, military brass band instrumentation, and European musical styles such as polka and waltz.

European immigrants from Germany, Poland, and Czechia to northern Mexico also brought dance traditions such as the varsovienne. The focus on the accordion in the music of their home countries was integrated into Mexican music, and became an essential instrument. It was called norteño ("northern") because it was most popular in the northern regions of Mexico.

The late 1910s and 1920s were the golden age of the corrido, a form of ballad. Mexicans on both sides of the border came to San Antonio, Texas, to record in hotels. Their songs memorialize the Mexican political revolution of the time. Los Alegres de Terán and Los Donneños were among the first norteño bands. Later in the century, the genre became more commercial with the works of Los Relámpagos del Norte and other groups. More recent bands such as Intocable integrate elements of rock music and other popular styles.

== Modernization ==
Modern norteño has also diverged significantly from more original "oldie" norteño of pre-1950s artists such as Narciso Martínez. Since the 1970s and 1980s, most norteño bands have replaced the tololoche with an electric bass guitar, and the snare drum with a full drum set. The traditional bajo sexto-accordion style of Los Alegres de Terán and Los Donneños transformed into the modern style typical to that of Los Tigres del Norte, Los Tucanes de Tijuana, Intocable, and Duelo. In 2014, Los Tigres del Norte released the album Realidades, which contains the song "Era Diferente" ("She Was Different") about a lesbian teenager who falls in love with her best friend; according to lead singer and songwriter Jorge Hernández, this is the first time a norteño band has ever written a gay love song.

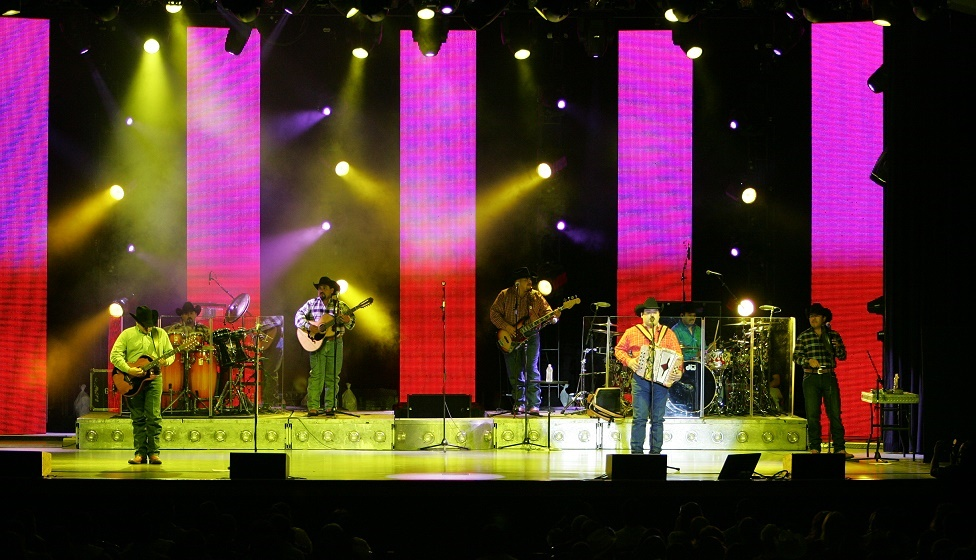
Intocable

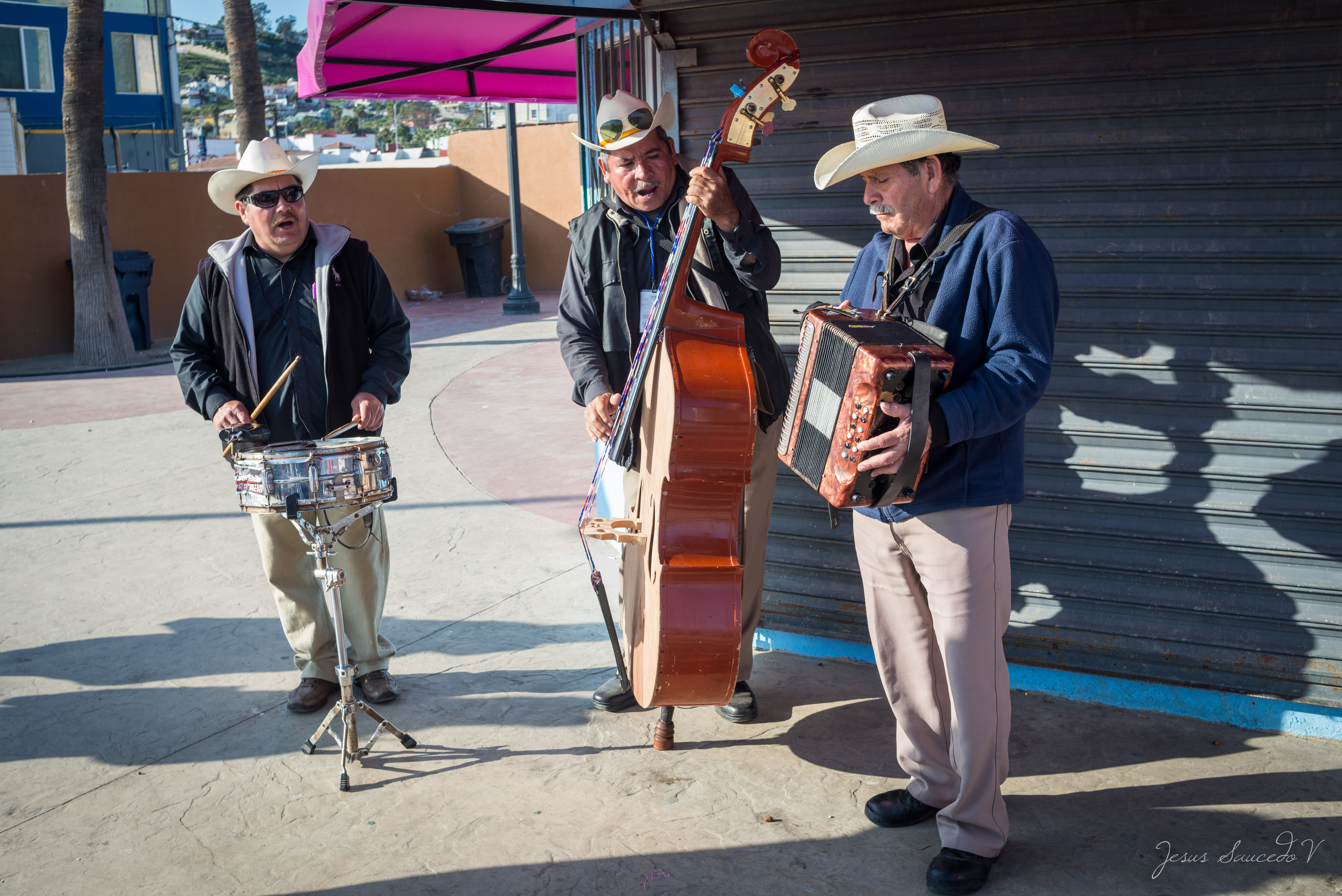
A pre-1970s-style norteño ensemble in Baja California, Mexico, consisting of an accordion, a tololoche and a snare drum ("tarola").

== Regional variations ==
Northeastern Norteño: The most traditional style of norteño. Mainly popular in Mexico's northeastern and central states, and parts of the United States with large Mexican populations from those regions. Some artists that fall under this style include Los Cadetes de Linares, Ramón Ayala y Los Bravos del Norte, Carlos y José, Los Invasores de Nuevo León, and Los Cardenales de Nuevo León.

Pacific Norteño: Uses the same instruments as traditional northeastern norteño, but has a rougher sound; in part due to being influenced by Sinaloan banda music. Also, some bands use a piano accordion instead of the traditional button accordion. Mainly popular in the Mexican states that border the Pacific Ocean, as well as the central states, and in parts of the United States with large Mexican populations from those regions. Some artists from this style include Los Tigres del Norte, Los Tucanes de Tijuana, Los Buitres de Culiacán, Los Titanes de Durango, and Marca Registrada.

Norteño-Sax: Incorporates an alto saxophone as a primary instrument along with an accordion. Sounds closer to traditional norteño, but with an emphasis on the saxophone. Several bands are influenced by grupero music and incorporate an electronic keyboard for their ballads and romantic cumbias. Mainly popular in Mexico's landlocked states, and in parts of the United States with large Mexican populations from that region. Some artists under this umbrella include Conjunto Primavera, Los Rieleros del Norte, Polo Urías y su Máquina Norteña, La Fiera de Ojinaga, and La Maquinaria Norteña.

Norteño-Banda: Is essentially pacific norteño, but replaces the bass with a sousaphone; an instrument typically used in banda music for the low notes. Like bass-driven pacific norteño, it is mainly popular in Mexico's pacific and central states, and in parts of the United States with large Mexican populations from those regions. Some artists include Calibre 50, Voz de Mando, Colmillo Norteño, Revolver Cannabis, and Código FN.

Norteño Light: Is essentially northeastern norteño, but with a more pop-oriented sound, relaxed rhythms, and contemporary lyrics. It may also incorporate mildly rock elements. Mainly popular in Mexico's northeastern and central states, and parts of the United States with large Mexican populations from those regions. Some artists include Intocable, Duelo, Sólido, Siggno, and Grupo Frontera.

== See also ==
- Banda
- Grupera
- Sierreño
- Latin Grammy Award for Best Norteño Album
- Mariachi
- Music of Mexico
- Narcocorrido
- Nortec
- Regional Mexican music
- Tejano
- Música Norteña: Mexican Migrants Creating a Nation Between Nations - Book about the genre
