= Dreaming of You (Selena album) =

Studio album by Selena
- Released: July 18, 1995
- Recorded: November 22, 1994 — March 30, 1995
- Genres: Pop; Latin pop
- Length: 51:47
- Languages: English; Spanish
- Labels: EMI; EMI Latin
- Producers: Keith Thomas; Guy Roche; Rhett Lawrence; Arto Lindsay; Susan Rogers; David Byrne; A.B. Quintanilla; José Hernàndez

Selena chronology
Las Reinas del Pueblo (1995)	Dreaming of You (1995)	Éxitos y Recuerdos (1996)

Singles from Dreaming of You
- 1. "I Could Fall in Love" Released: June 26, 1995; 2. "Tú Sólo Tú" Released: June 26, 1995; 3. "Dreaming of You" Released: August 14, 1995; 4. "Techno Cumbia" Released: August 14, 1995; 5. "El Toro Relajo" Released: November 1995; 6. "I'm Getting Used to You" Released: March 1996

Dreaming of You is the fifth and final studio album by American singer Selena, released posthumously on July 18, 1995, by EMI Records and EMI Latin. After witnessing her performance at the 1989 Tejano Music Awards, EMI Latin's José Behar envisioned her as "the next Gloria Estefan", and redirected his efforts toward securing her prominence in the Latin music industry before attempting an American pop crossover. After a succession of Spanish-language triumphs and a Grammy Award for Selena Live! (1993), the label signed her to SBK Records to commence the crossover project. The SBK contract drew widespread attention and was hailed as the year's most significant Tejano development. Recording for Dreaming of You initially stalled, in part due to Amor Prohibido (1994), as the label prioritized her Latin marketability.

After Selena's murder on March 31, 1995, the label resolved to issue a bilingual album, featuring unreleased English-language material intended for her crossover debut, two shelved contributions from the Don Juan DeMarco soundtrack, and remixes of earlier work. On Dreaming of You's English tracks, Selena primarily collaborated with producers Keith Thomas and Rhett Lawrence, alongside songwriter Diane Warren, and recorded a duet with David Byrne of Talking Heads.

Dreaming of You sold 175,000 copies on its first day of availability–a then-record for a female artist. The album debuted at number one on the Billboard 200, becoming the first predominantly Spanish-language release to do so. It sold 331,155 units in its first week, the second-highest total for a female vocalist, trailing Janet Jackson's janet (1993). Selena became the first Tejano artist to top the chart, with Billboard editors calling the feat "jaw-dropping" and "stunning", Newsweek hailing it as historic, and the Calgary Herald deemed it a musical milestone. The release posted the largest first-week sales ever by a Hispanic artist, and Billboard ranked its debut among the top ten in history, as well as the best-selling debut for a female artist. Dreaming of You holds the Guinness World Records for the first album by a Latin solo artist to debut at number one, the first solo posthumous number-one debut, and the first female vocalist to top the chart with a Spanish-language album. It remained the best-selling Latin and Latin pop album for two consecutive years. Certified 62x platinum (Latin) by the Recording Industry Association of America (RIAA), it remains the highest-certified Latin album and the best-selling Latin and Tejano album in U.S. history.

== Background ==
In 1957, Abraham Quintanilla joined the English-language Chicano doo-wop group The Dinos. Although initially successful, their popularity waned, and Quintanilla left the music industry to support his family. While working conventional jobs, Quintanilla discovered his daughter Selena Quintanilla's vocal ability and recalled, "I saw the continuation of my dreams." He formed a family band with Selena as lead singer, her brother A.B. Quintanilla on bass, and sister Suzette Quintanilla on drums; although initially hesitant, the children grew to enjoy performing. After Abraham's Tex-Mex restaurant failed during the 1980s oil bust, the family declared bankruptcy and moved to Corpus Christi, Texas, where Abraham began promoting the rebranded Selena y Los Dinos as a Tejano band. Selena saw Tejano as a strategic pathway to the mainstream pop market and embraced her ambition to become a pop musician. (Note: Selena aspired to leverage the Tejano genre as a strategic conduit for entry into the mainstream English-language pop market, and fully embraced the vision of becoming a pop musician.)

In 1983, Selena y Los Dinos recorded their first singles with Freddie Records, but poor promotion and low sales led Abraham to switch to Bob Grever's Cara Records, and later, in 1986, to Manny Guerra's G.P. Productions. The group built its reputation performing nonstop at private events and local venues, with Abraham relentlessly booking shows despite rejections fueled by gender bias. Promoters dismissed them as unremarkable. The band continued pushing forward with minimal earnings and limited industry support, culminating in a 1985 appearance on the Johnny Canales Show. In 1986, "Dame Un Beso", brought wider attention, and Selena's Tejano Music Award for Female Entertainer of the Year at age 15 stirred controversy by dethroning Laura Canales. The band's 1987 pop cover of "La Bamba", reached number 20 on the Billboard Hot Latin Songs chart, but was eclipsed by Los Lobos' version tied to the film. By 1988, they were among Texas's most requested Tejano acts. In 1989, José Behar urged Capitol Records Vice Chairman and CEO Joe Smith to develop a musician like Gloria Estefan, who received acclaim with "Conga" (1985), but Smith doubted the idea's viability. At the 1989 Tejano Music Awards, Selena y Los Dinos opened the ceremony. The show drew industry executives, including scouts from CBS Records and newly established EMI Latin. While CBS presented a higher financial offer, Behar, newly appointed as Vice President of EMI Latin, expressed a strong interest in signing the group. Abraham favored EMI's proposal, drawn by the label's promise of a future crossover into the mainstream market. Abraham was intent on positioning his children as pioneers of the new imprint, and the group rebranded simply as Selena.

== Development ==
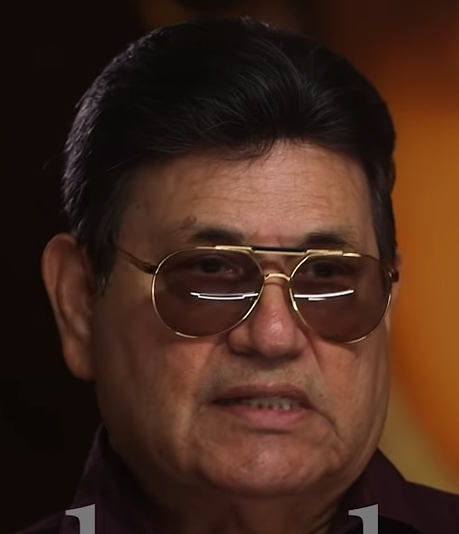
Abraham Quintanilla (pictured) remained resolute in his pursuit of a crossover album deal–a long-held ambition he shared with Selena from the outset.

Behar informed Smith that he found his "next Gloria Estefan," though he felt Selena's style and range evoked a synthesis of Janet Jackson and Whitney Houston. In March 1989, he signed her to EMI Latin, impressed by her talent but unsure of her chances in the male-dominated Tejano scene. He believed she could cross genre lines, first envisioning her for the English-language market, then recognizing her potential in Mexican and South American markets as a springboard to U.S. pop success. During production of Selena (1989), she hinted at an English-language album to follow. The record outperformed her female Tejano contemporaries, and in early 1990 she recorded three English-language demo tracks: "Where Did the Feeling Go?", "Is It the Beat?", and "Only Love." While Behar credited these with securing a crossover deal, Capitol Records urged him to grow her Spanish-language profile. To shift perceptions, Behar invited executives to the 1990 Tejano Music Awards, where Selena performed a reworked, Spanish-language adaptation, hip-hop-inflected "Is It the Beat?"–retitled "Enamorada de Ti." Once the label shifted its focus onto Selena, however, her career momentum accelerated dramatically. "Enamorada de Ti" appeared on her second Spanish-language studio album, Ven Conmigo (1990), which peaked at number three on the Billboard Regional Mexican Albums chart.

On March 1, 1991, at a Capitol Records showcase, Selena debuted English-language tracks from her planned pop album. San Antonio Express-News critic Ben Tavera King praised her Whitney Houston-like ballad style, dynamic choreography, and rhythmic range, calling her the perfect artist at the ideal time for a mainstream breakthrough. On April 23, Selena told The Monitor that Capitol Records planned a September release, with a completed MTV-bound music video for "Where Did the Feeling Go?" Selena continued discussing the project while promoting her third Spanish-language studio album, Entre a Mi Mundo (1992), which spent eight months atop the Regional Mexican Albums chart, setting new sales benchmarks for female Tejano artists. She recorded "Missing My Baby" (1992) to prove her crossover readiness, but the album was repeatedly delayed as the label urged her to grow her fan base first. While Capitol Records publicly expressed confidence in Selena's crossover prospects, noting that they were actively cultivating her career in preparation for her crossover album, Behar and EMI Latin attorney, Stephen Finfer, met internal resistance, with Finfer baffled at the label's failure to see her potential. They considered moving her to sister label SBK Records. By August 1992, Selena told Billboard she had begun recording demos for SBK, but in October said full production would wait until 1993.

After four years of lobbying, Behar secured Smith's approval for Selena's English-language crossover album–only for Smith to leave the label in 1993. Behar began the fight anew with incoming CEO Charles Koppelman, facing persistent skepticism. Vice President of A&R Nancy Brennan, recalled Behar's tirelessness, and almost obsessive, promotion of Selena. A&R's Michell Lee championed Selena, but executives dismissed her as a Tex-Mex novelty. Brennan first met Selena at the 1993 Billboard Latin Music Convention in Las Vegas, where Lee, at his own expense, bribed executives to witness her performance. Initially expecting to see the label's Jon Secada, Brennan was captivated by Selena's opening performance. Inspired by Secada's U.S. pop success, Capitol pushed bilingual projects, and Koppelman became SBK's leading advocate for Latin crossover. Selena became the first female Tejano singer to win a Grammy Award for Best Mexican-American Album for Selena Live! (1993), which brought national attention and accelerated the crossover push. In November, she signed a $5 million multi-album contract with SBK Records, orchestrated by Finfer, with SBK preparing to invest extensively to ensure the album's success. Koppelman and EMI's Daniel Glass envisioned her as a Madonna level pop force, while Brennan led the project.

Selena became SBK's third Hispanic crossover act after Secada and the Barrio Boyzz, however, Burr noted that unlike them, she'd been a top-selling performer since 1989. Backed by years of experience, she was expected to dominate both Latino and U.S. pop markets. Calling the moment surreal on MTV, Selena admitted she feared starting fresh in the American pop scene but embraced the challenge. The deal made international headlines, Billboard's front page, and was hailed as 1993's biggest Tejano news. It marked a return to her English roots, viewed by The New York Times as both compromise and artistic expansion.

Selena's fourth Spanish-language album, Amor Prohibido (1994), considered her "crowning achievement" and her best work, topped Billboard's Top Latin Albums chart and cemented her status as the hottest artist in the Latin market. Her English-language debut was planned for 1994, but delayed to early 1995. Throughout 1994, Selena juggled recording sessions with her Amor Prohibido tour dates, finalizing song selections by summer. By December, she publicly announced the album's imminent release. Privately, she confided to Behar that she felt guilty for the announcement, noting she had yet to record a single track. Behar, fearing more delays, falsified to Koppelman that Selena intended to leave the label to pursue a label committed to producing an English-language record. Faced with the threat of losing her, the label capitulated, and recording sessions were promptly scheduled.

== Production ==
A.B. resisted SBK Records' attempts to control song choices, bristling at having to audition despite his track record. Under deadline, he produced a lyricless bridge, with Selena writing the words to protect creative ownership. The resulting ballad, "Oh No I'll Never Fall in Love Again", secured his role as producer, though vague credits signaled ongoing struggles over control. In February 1994, SBK sent A.B. to New York City to recruit producers for Selena's crossover album, exploring collaborations with Shep Pettibone, and choose songs for a planned fall release.

Selena, under intense national scrutiny, faced speculation from industry figures from Nashville to Los Angeles about whether Tejano–pop crossovers could truly succeed. Tom Moon of The Philadelphia Inquirer, noted the cultural dissonance she navigated, urging her to bring the vibrancy of her Latin work into the ballad-heavy pop market. Burr predicted that even moderate crossover success would trigger a national search for the next artist able to straddle cultures and genres, believing Selena was balancing producers' input with her artistic integrity. Selena admitted the prospect of becoming the first Tejano musician to break big in mainstream pop was both flattering and daunting: "All eyes are on you, and if you fail, you're going to fall on your face. You don't want anything to go wrong." Selena insisted she had no intention of abandoning Tejano music for English-language pop, (Note: Atrributed to multiple references:) saying it would feel wrong to distance herself from the foundation of her success. She reaffirmed her love for her culture and her fans, promising that her roots would remain central regardless of language. Observers believed this commitment strengthened her crossover potential, with EMI Latin's Elvia Castillas noting she had yet to reach her full potential despite dominating the Tejano scene. By August 1994, plans were announced to release her English-language album in early 1995.

By December 1994, A.B. had written three songs for Selena's English-language album, for a record she described as an eclectic mix of R&B, pop, dance, and ballads–mirroring the genre fusion of her Tejano work. She aimed to refine the sound based on audience feedback, insisting on originality over imitation, a sentiment echoed by KUNO-AM's Luis Muñoz, who praised her authentic use of Spanglish for bilingual listeners. While talk of adapting Amor Prohibido into English circulated, plans focused on mainstream pop over direct translations of cumbias and polkas. After Amor Prohibido's success, A.B. shifted his role to producing its successor, scheduled for May 1995. Leaving SBK offering few details to the press, saying that the album would arrive in spring. Brennan believed Selena could succeed in a dual-language career, while Selena envisioned music eventually giving her time to pursue her passion in fashion design and expanding her Selena Etc. boutiques.

== Recording ==
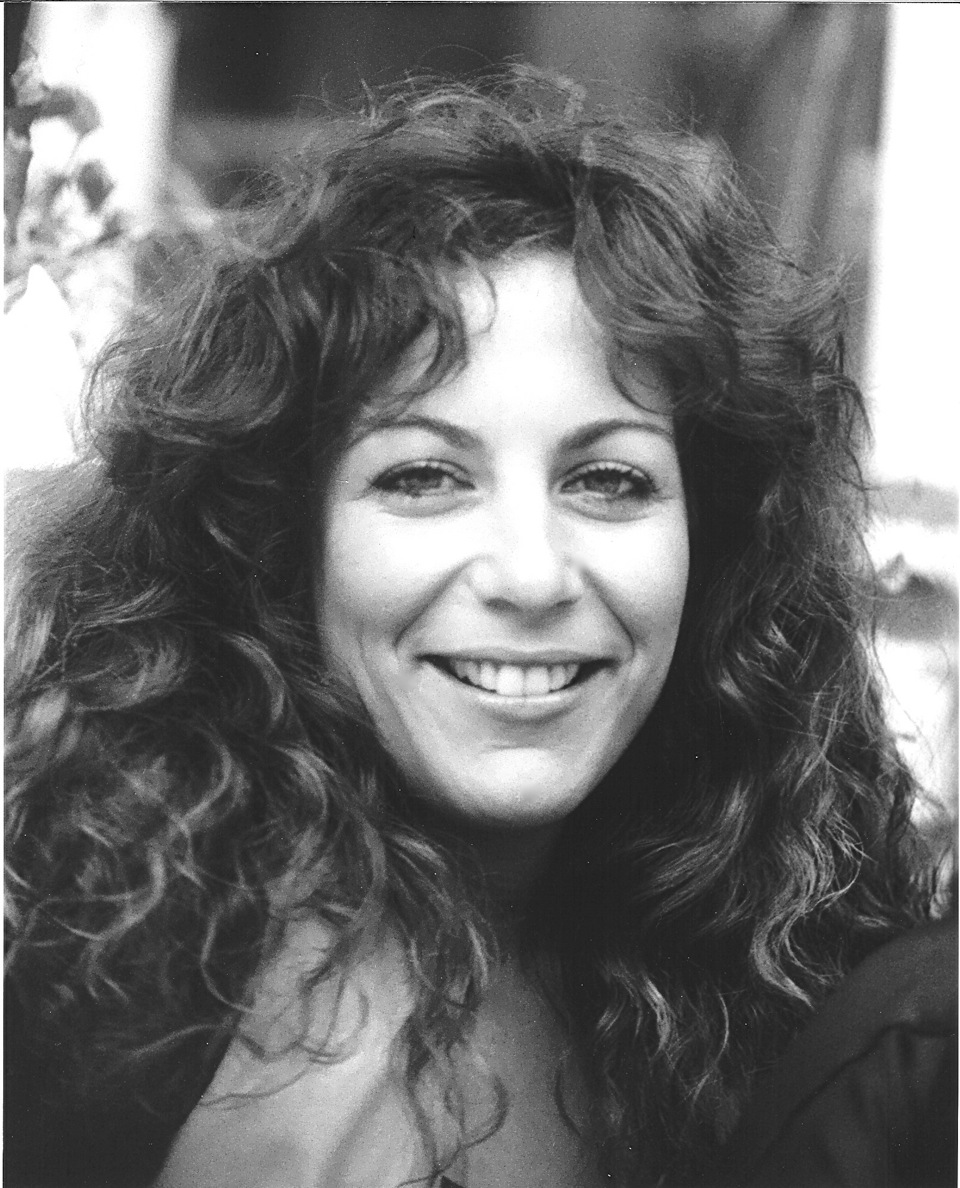
Selena opted to record "Dreaming of You", penned by Franne Golde (pictured) and Tom Snow–the sole track for which Capitol Records granted her the autonomy of choice.

In March 1994, Polygram's Dawn Soler introduced Selena's music to Toby Emmerich, who was seeking a female mariachi singer for his film Don Juan DeMarco. On November 22, José Hernández supervised the dubbing of Selena's vocals for five tracks intended for the Don Juan DeMarco soundtrack. Initially arranged for 14-year-old Nydia Rojas, the producers reassigned them to Selena for a mature delivery. The film's producer aimed for the mariachi recordings to capture the authentic feel of 1940s and 1950s ranchera songs. Hernández reported that three tracks were ultimately recorded. Suzette recalled Selena's boisterous rehearsals for "El Toro Relajo," shouting "toro, toro, toroooo" so often she grew tired of the song–though she later praised the final version for showcasing Selena's range. Inspired, Selena expressed a desire to record a mariachi album honoring Mexican musical roots. Hernández completed the mixes that December at Cherokee Studios in West Hollywood, with Marlon Brando praising the tracks she recorded.

The label enlisted top producers to reframe Selena's sound for mainstream appeal. Producer, Keith Thomas, first discovered Selena through a videocassette performance that instantly captivated him. Though in high demand and costly, he committed to working on her English-language album–initially planning to produce it entirely before scaling back to half. In July, Selena and A.B. met him in Nashville, where he played several tracks, including "I Could Fall in Love". A.B. urged her to record it. Thomas told American Songwriter that while he sees himself primarily as a melody writer, he did both the music and lyrics for "I Could Fall in Love". Selena returned in March 1995 with Pérez, receiving Thomas's demo, complete an incomplete Spanish interlude. The section was left for her to rewrite, and Thomas gave her full creative control.

Producer, Guy Roche, impressed by a demo tape, traveled to Corpus Christi to work with Selena. Composers Franne Golde and Tom Snow wrote "I'll Be Dreamin'" at Snow's Laurel Canyon home. By the end of the day, they'd sketched most of the track. They pitched it to the Tongan-American R&B sibling group The Jets in 1989. Their father-manager, Maikeli Wolfgramm, turned it down. While the English lyrics read as innocuous, in a Tongan cultural context, the song's themes could be seen as at odds with the traditional veitapui practice. Golde continued to champion the song, following Brennan indicating that she was soliciting songs for Selena's crossover album in 1993. Given the label's vested interest in the commercial success of Selena's English-language debut, she was permitted to select only one song of personal preference for inclusion. Suzette observed that Selena deliberated extensively over song selections to ensure each track authentically conveyed her identity and emotions. Selena chose "I'll Be Dreamin'," later retitled "Dreaming of You," after listening to it. Selena believed it had all the elements of a hit recording. Golde checked in with Brennan about the song's fate, noting that more than a year passed before Selena finally recorded it. On March 7, 1995, despite battling a sore throat, Selena recorded the vocal track under the direction of Roche, who recalled how Selena immediately nailed her vocals, despite preoccupations with personal issues surrounding her boutiques. Roche likened her to Celine Dion "but on a much higher level spiritually and artistically." When Roche played back the track, Selena appeared serene. Roche cast an anxious glance toward Brennan, as Selena was concerned that Brennan might disapprove of her Spanish notes. Upon hearing Selena interweave Spanish phrasing into "Dreaming of You", Brennan expressed approval; she subtly indicated that such stylistic choices should be used sparingly. Salvatore Caputo of The Arizona Republic interpreted it as a telling indication that, for true mainstream success, artists are often required to dilute, rather than celebrate, their cultural identity. On the same day she recorded "Dreaming of You", Selena also recorded "Captive Heart", and agreed to cut Diane Warren's "I'm Getting Used to You".

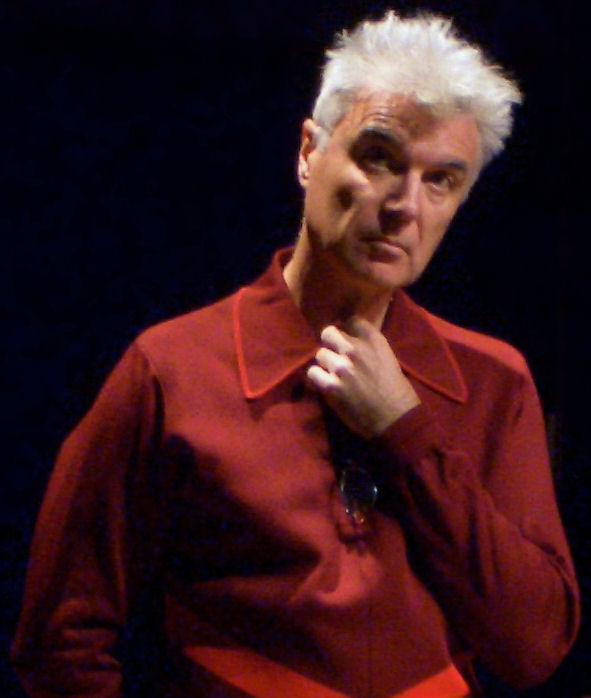
David Byrne (pictured) was invited to collaborate with Selena on a song for the Don Juan DeMarco soundtrack; however, after completing the recording, he was informed that the producers had chosen a different creative direction and shelved the track–much to Byrne's frustration.

In March, for a Don Juan DeMarco club scene, producers approached David Byrne, who suggested his in-progress song "God's Child" as a potential duet with Selena. Sending the analog multitrack tape to Q-Productions, Byrne encouraged her to interpret it freely; she reimaged the song as an impassioned embodiment of "la castigadora," evolving it into "God's Child (Baila Conmigo)," encapsulating a fierce yearning for liberation through dance. Though Byrne found Selena to be more of a unifying symbol than a musical innovator, he was impressed by her ingenuity and felt she elevated the track. The soundtrack producers voiced concern over its bilingual format and questioned its marketability as a single. Plans for a music video directed by Tim Pope were scrapped, once Bryan Adams agreed to record the soundtrack. Selena's contributions, along with those by Michael Stipe and Tori Amos, were shelved in favor of Adams' work. Byrne admitted he was "pissed off" by the decision, though by May, the song was positioned to be in the soundtrack of Blue in the Face.

Selena falling ill in early 1995 delayed the album's release to summer, with 13 tracks planned for completion by May. SBK slated her English-language debut for May, later delayed to fall due to her heavy Latin market commitments. Brennan noted the unprecedented nature of producing a debut for an artist who didn't have time to record, noting that she couldn't tell Selena not to perform at the Houston Astrodome in front of a record 60,000 attendees to record her album. In the months after Selena signed with SBK, the label kept insisting they couldn't pull her off her Latin music tour long enough to record. Throughout the first three weeks of March, Abraham was inundated with requests for Selena to perform throughout the U.S. and Mexico, at the same time Selena was scheduled to start recording material for her next Tejano album. While Selena was in the studio on March 30, 1995, she was scheduled to travel to Los Angeles to record additional material for her English-language album. Future recording sessions were scheduled to take place in April and May. Throughout the recording sessions for the English-language album, Selena was elated, realizing her childhood dream of introducing her music to new audiences, and wanted to represent the best of both America and the Hispanic world. She told The Tampa Tribune the album revealed a side of her fans had never seen and promised they would be genuinely surprised.

Selena's crossover album was the most anticipated release within the Tejano industry, and it was expected to lift Tejano music to greater heights, as executives speculated on its potential to redefine the trajectory of Tejano music. Industry consensus held that Selena was on the verge of attaining significantly broader acclaim that the English-language album she was recording would establish her as an international dance pop luminary or a significant figure in American entertainment, posited to share a mainstream audience with the era's top artists. The album was widely anticipated to serve as Selena's definitive crossover into the wider pop music landscape, (Note: Attributed to multiple references:) cementing her as a household name. (Note: Attributed to multiple references:) On the morning of March 31, 1995, while Selena was slated to record additional vocal tracks for her crossover album at Q-Productions, she was shot to death by a former business associate and friend. Later that afternoon, the Quintanilla family was interviewed by a San Antonio news channel, where they captured the first time that many of the family first heard of Selena's "Dreaming of You."

== Posthumous efforts ==
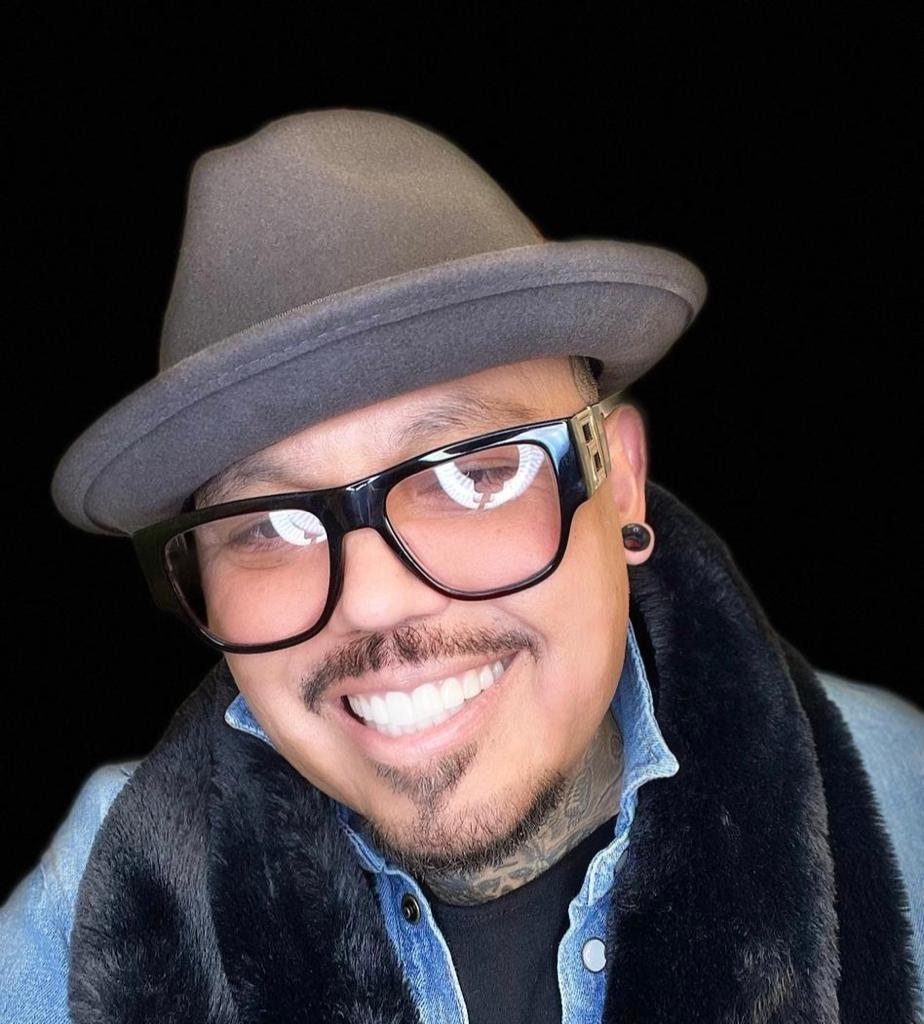
Initially, A.B. Quintanilla (pictured) was commissioned to produce the English-language album, however, the success of Amor Prohibido (1994) redirected his efforts toward her Latin repertoire. Following Selena's death, EMI's Nancy Brennan reinstated him to oversee the album's posthumous completion.

Before her death, Selena recorded four English tracks for her crossover album. Thomas was finishing "I Could Fall in Love" when news of her death broke; stunned, he withdrew for days, later calling its completion one of the most challenging tasks of his career. Roche, working on "Dreaming of You," heard the news immediately after her sustained final "tonight", a moment that traumatized him for months. The production took on a darker tone, extending the fadeout so her voice lingered in silence. On April 3, 1995, A.B. told Burr he feared there wasn't enough material for a full album and considered adding earlier English tracks, leaving the project's future uncertain. On April 10, Brennan announced a retrospective including the four English-language songs, "God's Child (Baila Conmigo)", and possibly her Don Juan DeMarco recordings. Brennan brought A.B. in to finish the album, who dedicated several months to the album's production, while Abraham managed business affairs. She believed the family was best suited to protect Selena's legacy. The label viewed completion as a moral imperative, driven by public demand.

Pérez found it agonizing to work with Selena's vocals after her death, often asking to mute them except for brief references because hearing her voice was too painful. Determined to finish the album, he said, walking into the studio without her was worse than he'd imagined–pressing play and hearing her voice would break him, making it excruciating to reshape his guitar parts. Brennan called producing the record "the hardest thing I've ever done", recalling how they'd listen to Selena's voice all day and end up in tears while mixing. On April 13, Behar's office told La Opinión there was enough material for a possible double album, including "God's Child (Baila Conmigo)", four mariachi songs, and three Tejano tracks planned for her next Spanish release. Billboard reported she had recorded vocals for "A Boy Like That," though the National Academy of Recording Arts & Sciences (NARAS) clarified that instrumentation and mixing were unfinished and distribution discussions were still underway.

On April 19, EMI Latin announced the release of four unreleased English-language tracks for Selena's crossover album, along with a remix of "Missing My Baby" and six reworked singles. The selections focused on songs from the past two to three years–Anglicized Latin tracks with Mexican and Tex-Mex roots, infused with R&B elements. Behar said the album was meant to introduce English-speaking audiences to the music that defined Selena's career, choosing Spanish songs accessible to English listeners. Critic Mario Tarradell, of The Dallas Morning News, however, saw this as an issue and felt the project carried more commercial weight than heartfelt tribute. Abraham proposed new live-style versions of "Amor Prohibido" (1994), "Bidi Bidi Bom Bom" (1994), and "Como la Flor" (1992), with Los Dinos returning to the studio to capture their stage energy. A.B. believed the mix of familiarity and freshness would resonate. Grief initially kept Suzette from listening to the album, she described the tracks Selena recorded as haunting reminders of what could have been. A.B., sent to New York to work with Full Force, remixed "Missing My Baby" and "Techno Cumbia" (1994) with a reggae-inspired twist; Astudillo felt the latter pushed into pop territory. A.B. admired the Barrio Boyzz's R&B and hip-hop fusion, noting Selena's seamless fit with their 1994 single "Donde Quiera Que Estés". Envisioned as a cross-promotional effort, the track introduced Selena to the international Latin pop audience. It was re-recorded as a Spanglish version, with the Barrio Boyzz singing English lyrics by Desmond Child. Group member Louie found the rework emotionally difficult, noting Selena's laughter and warmth now sounded sorrowful.

On May 22, EMI announced Dreaming of You, a 13-track bilingual compilation. On July 9, it was announced that "El Toro Relajo" would join "Tú Sólo Tú" as the only two tracks shelved from the Don Juan DeMarco soundtrack to be included on Dreaming of You. Brennan told Time magazine she believed the film's producers regretted cutting Selena's contributions. Tensions arose when the label asked to remove Hernández's vocals from his duet with Selena, prompting his retort: "Excuse me? You're asking an artist to redo his painting." Hernández claimed Abraham didn't want his voice on the track and doubted Selena would have agreed. Behar predicted Dreaming of You would satisfy fans and attract new listeners curious about Selena's acclaim. EMI's Davitt Siggerson felt she sounded effortless at home in English, while Bennett called the album both elegy and celebration, with production on par with the era's top artists. Leading with English-language tracks ensured the flow wouldn't jar non-Spanish audiences. Although three to six more English demos existed, the label withheld them pending market response. In September 2015, Abraham unveiled "Oh No (I'll Never Fall in Love Again)", on Selena Q Radio, which he operates, taken from a 1994 rehearsal that circulated on YouTube as an a cappella snippet. He said the original wasn't "up to par" sonically, but its release reignited fan enthusiasm. That December, he debuted another rehearsal recording, "Are You Ready to Be Loved", written by Pamela Philips Oland and A.B., for the crossover album.

== Music and lyrics ==
"Dreaming of You"
Critics found "Dreaming of You" to be a romantic ballad blending pop, funk, and synth textures with diary-like lyrics of longing, praised for its heartfelt vocal performance, and it is regarded as Selena's signature English-language song and her greatest vocal work.

The album opens with "I Could Fall in Love", a romantic ballad blending pop, soul, R&B, and Tex-Mex. (Note: Pop, soul, R&B, and Tex-Mex. Described as a romantic, ballad,) The song is noted for breathy, sultry vocals, flamenco-inspired guitar flourishes, and Spanish midbreak phrases that many felt created a dreamy, evocative mood. (Note: Breathy, sultry vocals, flamenco guitar, Spanish phrases, evocative mood.) The arrangement shifts from soft pop-rock, to a smooth, mid-tempo groove underpinned by an understated beat. (Note: Mid-tempo, soft pop, rock, smooth, groove, understated beat.) Critics compared its lush elegance to early Madonna, Estefan, Karen Carpenter, and Celine Dion, with touches of Janet Jackson, the Jackson 5, Vanessa Williams, Wendy Moten, and Paula Abdul. The Spanish refrains were viewed as sensual or exoticized, with some finding the bilingual delivery compelling. Critics of the lyrics found them simplistic, clichéd, or sentimental. (Note: Breathy spoken interlude in Spanish, Breathy Spanish notes, Exotic flourishes. Poignant whisphered Spanish refrain, compelling, simplistic, cliched, sentimental.) Billboard described the lyrics as Selena teetering on the edge of heartbreak if she allows herself to fall. Some dismissed the slow tempo as bland, likening it to R&B ballads popularized by TLC, Brandy, or Amy Grant, and argued that even the Spanish guitar flourishes couldn't overcome its predictability. (Note: Slow tempo as bland, TLC, Brandy, Amy Grant, predictable.) Instrumentation was alternately praised for texture, and faulted as overproduced. (Note: Weighed down by an overused slow R&B rhythm. richly textured pop ballad, albeit one burdened by somewhat excessive percussion and uninspired keyboards. Overproduced.) Still, for many, Selena's rich, sultry alto and celestial soprano elevated the song above its compositional limitations, (Note: Supple nuance of Selena's vocal tone. Celestial soprano. Her interpretive gifts elevate the song into something extraordinary. Potent alto, sultry alto.) transforming it into a romantic anthem that resonated with both English-and Spanish-speaking audiences.

Critics widely noted Selena's adept traversal of late 1980s and 1990s R&B-pop idioms, on "Captive Heart," the album's second track. It drew parallels to Abdul, Janet and Michael Jackson, and Madonna, for its dance pop polish and rhythmic vitality. With synth-infused pop-soul, horns, layered percussion, and sleek urban-contemporary production, (Note: A sleek, polished tracks for urban contemporary radio.) it balanced uptempo grooves with soulful mezzo emoting. Critics highlighted Selena's tonal versatility. Lyrically, "Captive Heart" depicts a risky infatuation sparked by a stranger's allure. Some admired its sensual, catchy chorus, while others noted rushed production and thin instrumentation. Though formulaic in places, its energy and gritty R&B edge, marked one of her boldest pop songs. (Note: She injects fiery intensity, admired her gritty performance on the R&B-infued track.)

The album's third track, "I'm Getting Used to You" was described as a hybrid of War-style funk and the polished sophistication of Vanessa Williams, combining a buoyant, mid-tempo groove with effervescent pop hooks and a lightly percussive backdrop that evokes an irresistible sense of motion. Critics noted echoes of Patrice Rushen and Deniece Williams, with a Motown undercurrent, urban-contemporary appeal that recalls Madonna at her most "Like a Virgin" era. Some praised its inventive qualities and glimpse of her full crossover potential, while others criticized sterile programming and rushed horn charts. Burr called it the album's finely crafted song, with layered Latin beats and Tejano brass under an R&B pulse, subtly revealing her heritage. According to Newsday, even in moments where the production leaned glib or dated, her precise and assured delivery–shaped in part by Madonna and Janet Jackson–commanded attention.

"God's Child (Baila Conmigo)" emerges as one of the album's most distinctive and forward-looking tracks, offering a grounded roots-infused Tejano-rock sensibility and standing out as a clear stylistic departure. The track contrasts Bryne's measured delivery with Selena's emotive Spanish responses, her deep timbre fitting the flamenco rock base. Minimalist arrangement mixes acoustic guitar, marimba, harmonium, and worldbeat rhythms, creating a bilingual interplay with spiritual and Latin overtones. Critics praised its cultural richness, sultry fusion of languages, eclectic fusion, and daring style, ranking it among the album's best. Descriptions ranged from mystical samba duet, to eclectic centerpice with haunting rhythmic interplay, and sultry energy. While Stereo Review saw Byrne's role as contrived, consensus celebrated it as a high point and glimpse of unrealized artistic growth. (Note: Most gratifying departure, daring material, eclectic centerpiece, culturally resonant, lone, electrifying exception, sole moment of true artistry on the album, most compelling cut,)

"Dreaming of You", opening with soft keyboard textures, is a romantic ballad that blends polished American pop with subtle funk, layered synths, and a brief Spanish interlude. Comparison were made to Mariah Carey, Madonna, Doris Day, and Whitney Houston. Its diary-like lyrics center on longing and dream-bound intimacy, delivered with a mix of sensuality, vulnerability, and low-register vibrato. Some critics found "Dreaming of You" as formulaic adult contemporary pop. While not universally praised for innovation, its heartfelt performance cemented it as her signature English-language recording and her greatest vocal work. (Note: Heartfelt performance, her signature English track, greatest vocal work.) The reimagined version of "Missing My Baby" is presented as a soul-harmony remix, reworked with hip-hop elements by Full Force, that adds doo-wop glow, smooth R&B veneer, and funk phrasing. Selena's supple tone and ornamentation, drew praise for adaptability, though some saw it as light or inferior to the original. Lyrically a lament for distant love, it blends R&B, funk, and soul within pop accessibility, ending the English half of Dreaming of You with the refrain "You're always on my mind."

Opening Dreaming of You's Spanish repertoire, "Amor Prohibido" delivers marimba-driven cumbia-pop with Caribbean bounce, rock inflections, and vibrant instrumentation of guitars, accordions, and flutes, (Note: Breezy, marimba-driven, Caribbean timable bounce, subly rocking, and vibrant instrumentation.) The track was praised by Howard Blumenthal for its intensified delivery over the original, while University Wire, praised its uplifting portrayal of love challenged by prejudice. "Wherever You Are (Donde Quiera Que Estés)" pairs Selena with the Barrio Boyzz in a bilingual fusion of Latin R&B, soul, and pop, (Note: Spiritual remiagining, playful bilingual turn, blending of various genres.) enriched by rock and jazz accents. It earned praise for an enhanced clarity, harmonic interplay, and spirited energy, though Vibe's Chuck Eddy saw it as a marginal entry.

"God's Child (Baila Conmigo)"
"God's Child (Baila Conmigo)" is a rootsy, flamenco-infused Tejano-rock duet with bilingual interplay between David Byrne and Selena, praised for its eclectic instrumentation, cultural richness, and daring fusion, consensus among critics hailed it as one of Dreaming of You's standout tracks, most forward-looking recordings, and a glimpse of Selena's unrealized artistic growth.

"Techno Cumbia", a genre-blending track mixing cumbia syncopations, dancehall beats, Caribbean grooves, and rap cadences, emerges as one of Dreaming You's most sonically adventurous tracks, a bold synthesis of disparate genres and rhythmic traditions. (Note: Experiment, described as the album's most sonically adventurous track, bold synthesis of genres.) Critics considered "Techno Cumbia" perhaps the album's most forward-looking moment, observing that its dancehall-style beats and rapid-fire delivery eerily forecast the reggaeton surge that emerged a decade later. Billboard's Leila Cobo similarly described A.B. as a precursor to that movement, arguably a generation ahead of his time. "El Toro Relajo" and the Pedro Infante cover of "Tú Sólo Tú", reframed through her own lens, are identified as being mariachi ballads, (Note: Attributed to multiple references:) ranchera songs. The tracks contain spirited brass, acoustic guitar, and authentic delivery, praised for emotional depth and subtle pathos over grand vocal flourishes. (Note: Emotional depth, grand vocal flourishes.) Critics regarded them as heartfelt tributes to her heritage and emotional high points of Dreaming of You. (Note: Attributed to multiple references:) The career-launching track, "Como la Flor" brings a signature Tejano cumbia chorus and lyrics of heartbreak and resilience, while "Bidi Bidi Bom Bom" fuses cumbia-reggae, (Note: Irresistibly infectious, lighthearted and playful, cumbia-reggae fusion.) buoyant synth textures, and salsa touches into one of the album's most irresistible, high-energy tracks, noted for surpassing some English songs in emotional immedicacy, "Bidi Bidi Bom Bom" closes Dreaming of You.

== Release and promotion ==
On March 24, 1995, EMI Latin announced Selena's untitled English-language debut for May 23, 1995, with Selena expressing hope it would draw new audiences to Tejano music. Following her death, executives voiced shock and grief, while Latino communities across the U.S. reacted negatively, many non-Hispanic audiences were unfamiliar with Selena. Sigerson pledged to work with her family, while Abraham feared appearing to exploit her death; promoters argued the material could serve as a tribute. On April 10, the label revealed plans for a bilingual retrospective blending English and Spanish tracks, co-produced by EMI Latin and EMI Records for a mid-July release. Abraham called it an anthology, with marketing emphasizing her charisma, bilingual appeal, and cultural bridge-building. Robbins opined that the label began construction of the album in response to the broad interest that followed the singer's death.

In mid-April, Sigerson and Behar finalized a bilingual release strategy for Dreaming of You, with Margo Chase handling artwork and merchandising. On May 22, EMI announced the July 18 release date and the album's title, which Suzette said perfectly captured Selena's long-held English-language dream. Sigerson called it the realization of her crossover vision, and on June 8, the label pledged part of the proceeds to the EMI Selena Scholarship Fund. The package included a 24-page booklet as an introduction to English-speaking audiences, photos, Spanish lyric translations, production credits, and merchandise listings. Behar framed it as both a career retrospective and an introduction for new fans; Patoski praised the design but criticized its lightened imagery, while Trevino noted the solemn cover portrait suggested a posthumous farewell.

EMI marketed Dreaming of You as a new product, and hired Rogers & Cowan for an extensive media campaign. Abraham led a nationwide promotional blitz with TV appearances and interviews, while EMI Records and EMI Latin each invested over $500,000 in in-store promotions, prime shelf placement, and a two-week Spanish-language media push. Capitalizing on Selena's rising mythic status, the label aggressively pursued the album's success, committing to an unprecedented rollout of two million units–surpassing Julio Iglesias's EMI Latin shipment record and rivaling the shipment number of Michael Jackson's HIStory: Past, Present and Future, Book I (1995). While Latino outlets lamented her unrealized potential, American media dubbed her the "Latin Madonna", a label Billboard's John Lannert dismissed as patronizing and aimed more at the uninformed. Burr described the media blitz as "one of the biggest CD promotional campaigns in the history of Latin music."

Internationally, Dreaming of You received a priority global rollout, with campaigns across Europe, Asia, and Africa. Behar expressed that "We're going to push [this album] relentlessly–at retail, on radio, [and] with the media." Dreaming of You had drawn significant international attention. The album was released in Europe and Japan on August 21, 1995. In Mexico, piracy reports prompted anti-smuggling efforts that seized thousands of copies; to curb bootlegging, shipments were withheld until the day before release, though counterfeit versions still spread quickly. Despite the Mexican peso crisis and higher pricing, EMI Music Mexico pressed 100,000 initial copies and coordinated promotions to match the U.S. launch, generating strong excitement in cities like Ciudad Juárez. The album was released in Canada on July 25, and "rush-released" in the United Kingdom on August 22, where Abraham promoted it on London Today.

To commemorate Selena's 20th year in music, Dreaming of You was reissued and made accessible for physical and digital purchase on September 22, 2002, with the "Dreaming of You" music video and spoken liner notes from family, friends, and band members. In May 2025, Suzette announced a 30th-anniversary remastered and remixed multi-format release for July 2025, including an Dolby Atmos-enabled version, highlighting the improved clarity from modern mastering techniques and her work designing the commemorative artwork.

=== Singles ===
Fearing "I Could Fall in Love" might cannibalize album sales, Sigerson withheld a commercial release, releasing it to radio on June 25, 1995, making it ineligible for Billboard's Hot 100 chart. The release drew massive airplay across Texas, (Note: Attributed to multiple references:) the Southwest, and Midwest. (Note: Attributed to multiple references:) Airplay intensity rivaled the day of Selena's death, spanning Spanish and English stations nationwide, proving its commercial viability. While a report in the New York Daily News found that most of "I Could Fall in Love"'s airplay was in Texas and on the West Coast, New York's WSKQ reported a higher-than-expected response. San Angelo's KLITE credited it with uniting English, Spanish, and African American listeners. Programmers expecting an ethnic Mexican mariachi-heavy track were surprised by "I Could Fall in Love", and KPWR, a hip-hop station with a Hispanic audience, reported mixed feedback, unsure if "I Could Fall in Love" fit their format despite generally positive reactions. Behar found that it signaled progress in mainstream radio recognition. Los Angeles's KPWR aired "I Could Fall in Love", their first Selena track, to overwhelmingly positive response. "I Could Fall in Love" drew heavy requests in Boston, and later in Kansas City, Oklahoma City, and Miami. Corpus Christi Caller-Times's Rene Cabrera noted the key question was whether her English-language tracks would sustain mainstream playlist presence beyond their initial surge. While the label welcomed its success, Selena's family found it emotionally difficult to hear her voice. Central Florida stations saw minimal requests, with no Top 40 adds at release. Regions with smaller Mexican American populations, such as Omaha's KQKQ and Miami's WPOW, also reported low demand. Some stations, like those in San Jose, California, delayed airplay rotation, while others limited play to overnight hours. Peaking at number two, "I Could Fall in Love" became the highest-charting English-language song on the Hot Latin Songs chart until "My Heart Will Go On" (1997), surpassed it. Selena became the first artist with both Spanish and English-language titles in the Hot Latin Songs chart top 10, when "Tú Sólo Tú" peaked at number one. Critics noted it introduced many Americans to her bilingual blend, elevating Tejano music's cultural profile once it broke into the top 20 on the Billboard Hot 100 Airplay. Canada's The Sault Star remarked that the English-speaking world is finally discovering what Spanish-speaking audiences have long known: "Selena is hot in any language."

"Tú Sólo Tú", released in conjunction with "I Could Fall in Love", as the second single, peaked at number one on the Hot Latin Songs chart, becoming the first traditional ranchera song to reach the top of the Billboard chart. It became Selena's seventh number-one single of her career, staying atop the chart for a record-tying 10 consecutive week reign. "I Could Fall in Love" and "Tú Sólo Tú" dominance were consistently displacing competing songs on the chart. On August 14, "Dreaming of You" was the first commercially released single off Dreaming of You, with its b-side "Techno Cumbia". Mitchell praised the CD single with "Techno Cumbia" as proof of Selena's global reach. On October 13, after VH1's Selena: Music, Tragedy, & Trail aired, the "Dreaming of You" music video premiered. Its release made Selena the first artist with four simultaneous Hot Latin Songs chart entries. "Dreaming of You" debuted at number 71 on the Hot 100 chart on the week ending September 16, 1995, later peaking at number 22 that Thanksgiving. The single was within the top five of seven monitored stations by Billboard. "Dreaming of You" became the first modern Tejano single in the Billboard Hot 100's top 40, and became Selena's highest-charting single of her career. Mitchell ranked "Dreaming of You" ninth among 1995's best songs, The Plain Dealer's critic Troy Smith named Selena the best vocalist of 1995, citing "Dreaming of You", "I Could Fall in Love" and "Tú Sólo Tú". Insider named "Dreaming of You" one of the 100 best songs of the 1990s. "Dreaming of You" and "I Could Fall in Love" remained popular in the 21st century, The title track and "I Could Fall in Love" ranked among the label's top-selling downloads from 2004 through 2005 and on iTunes following the 20th anniversary of her death. In July 2005, "Dreaming of You" earned a Nielsen BDS certification for 200,000 airplay spins. The song stands among the rock and roll era's most pivotal, officially launching Latin pop–a movement later personified by Jennifer Lopez. By March 2020, it had 1.15 million Spotify streams.

"I'm Getting Used to You", released as a single in March 1996, became one of the top 10 most-played songs in Florida, seven in Waco, Texas, and Miami. It peaked at number seven on Billboard's Bubbling Under Hot 100 chart, and number 23 on Billboard's Adult Contemporary Songs chart. The track's release received praise from Billboard's Larry Flick, who found the disco-house album remixes of David Morales to be vibrant. Its editors singled the remixes as one of 1996's best offerings. "El Toro Relajo", released in November, peaked at number 24 on the Hot Latin Songs chart, following its exit after four weeks on January 6, 1996, it ended Selena's record 21-month appearance on the chart, which began on April 16, 1994. In El Paso, "Missing My Baby", "I Could Fall in Love", and "Dreaming of You" received hourly rotation, with broadcasters praising Selena's cross-generational appeal. "Missing My Baby" peaked at number 22 on Billboard's Rhythmic Top 40 chart.

== Critical reception ==
=== Reviews ===
==== Initial critical response ====
Professional ratings
Review scores
Source	Rating
The Windsor Star	A
Tucson Citizen	A-
The Springfield News-Leader	5/5 stars
The Boston Phoenix	5/5 stars
Allmusic	5/5 stars
The Vancouver Sun	4/5 stars
MusicHound World: The Essential Album Guide	4/5 stars
Evening Chronicle	7.5/10 stars
Chronicle	7/10 stars
Fort Worth Star-Telegram	3.5/5 stars
Philadelphia Daily News	3.5/5 stars
The Knoxville News-Sentinel	3.5/5 stars
The Tampa Tribune	3.5/5 stars
Rolling Stone	3.5/5 stars
The Los Angeles Times	3/5 stars
New York Daily News	3/5 stars
Clarion-Ledger	3/5 stars
Lexington Herald-Leader	3/5 stars
Orlando Sentinel	3/5 stars
News-Pilot	3/5 stars
News and Record	3/5 stars
Fort Lauderdale Sun-Sentinel	3/5 stars
The Flint Journal	3/5 stars
The Houston Chronicle	3/5 stars
Phoenix Gazette	3/5 stars
The Virgin Encyclopedia of Nineties Music	3/5 stars
Arizona Republic	2.5/5 stars
The State	2.5/5 stars
The Star-Ledger	2.5/5 stars
The Atlanta Journal	2.5/5 stars
Chicago Tribune	2.5/5 stars
Dayton Daily News	2.5/5 stars
El Norte	2.5/5 stars
The Sacramento Bee	2/5 stars
The Indianapolis Star	2/5 stars
The Philadelphia Inquirer	2/5 stars
The Record	2/5 stars
The Guardian	2/5 stars
The Oregonian	2/5 stars
Anchorage Daily News	1.5/5 stars

Reviewers generally agreed that the Spanish-language songs were the most dynamic and authentic performances on Dreaming of You, often overshadowing the English-language material. (Note: Attributed to multiple references:) Caputo felt the English selections leaned toward adult contemporary radio and lacked Tejano influence, calling the Spanish songs the only consistently engaging portion of the record. In The Los Angeles Times, Enrique Lopetegui argued the Spanish tracks elevated the collection beyond its original pop concept. Tarradell described the English tracks as losing the "chica-del-barrio" personality of her earlier work, while The Guardian's Colt Sharpe found them less robust than the sensuous Spanish selections. The New Straits Times's Gerald Martinez noted that the Spanish numbers projected greater confidence, depth, and emotional vibrancy than the English material.

Selena's vocal adaptability drew widespread praise, with critics comparing her range to Minnie Riperton, Chaka Khan, Houston, Madonna, and Carey, and noting her ability to excel across multiple pop genres. (Note: Critics compared her to Minnie Riperton, Chaka Khan, Whitney Houston, and Mariah Carey. Corcoran placed her vocally above, she can adapt to various pop genres.) Michael Corcoran of the Austin American-Statesman, highlighted her skill across various styles, placing her above contemporaries like Madonna and Estefan. Houston Chronicle's Rick Mitchell and Newsday's Ira Robbins saw her as a crossover artist whose voice could adapt to varied pop idioms, while retaining sincerity. Other reviewers praised her balance of fragility and assertiveness, and her capacity to move fluidly between styles. (Note: Attributed to multiple references:) Many critics admired the album's stylistic range, noting its eclectic mix which showcased Selena's ability to navigate multiple genres with ease. (Note: Attributed to multiple references:) described by Austin American-Statesman's Don McLeese as an impressive mosiac, Times Colonist's Joseph Blake called it both a farewell and an introduction, blending past Spanish-language work with new urban pop. Several found the mix genre-defying, though not always cohesive. For some, this range undersocred her potential to dominate multiple markets, while Burr argued producers diluted her spark for mainstream appeal. Several reviewers criticized Dreaming of You for lacking cohesion, describing it as an overproduced patchwork of new and archival material assembled without a clear artistic vision. (Note: Attributed to multiple references:) J. Freedom du Lac in The Sacramento Bee, called it meandering, with English tracks hampered by a slick, suffocating veneer. Tarradell and Burr felt producers molded Selena into a generic pop singer, and Moon criticized the English material for lacking discernment. Others labeled it as a "posthumous assemblage" of uneven quality. (Note: Attributed to multiple references:) While some believed even formulaic arrangements were elevated by her delivery, others argued that without the tragedy surrounding its release, the music risked fading into forgettability.

Critics generally agreed that Dreaming of You marked a pivotal step in Selena's crossover ambitions, bridging her Tejano roots with mainstream pop aspirations. (Note: Attributed to multiple references:) Deborah Martin in El Paso Herald-Post noted that it bookeneded her career with English-language work, while Lannert and author John Hess saw it as capturing her transition from Latin music star to pop contender. Writing in The Indianapolis Star, Scott Miley likened her shift to Grant's or Linda Ronstadt's genre expansions, and Vibe's Ed Morales viewed it as a bridge between her cumbia-inflected past and English-language future. Michael Freedberg in the Boston Phoenix praised Selena's authenticity and emotional directions, and many concluded the album, while imperfect, affirmed her vast potential. (Note: Attributed to multiple references:)

Many reviewers framed Dreaming of You as a bittersweet testament, balancing nostalgia for Selena's past with the promise of a future cut short. (Note: Attributed to multiple references:) The Daily News's Mary Talbot likened it to a scrapbook of unfinished moments, while Katherine Monk in The Vancouver Sun emphasized the poignancy of her unguarded sincerity. The Waco Tribune-Herald's Carl Hoover compared its effect to Jim Croce's final work, noting its emotional range from joy to heartbreak. Ron Sylvester of The Springfield News-Leader called it a dual portrait of beauty and tragedy, and Carlos Rodriguez in El Norte questioned whether American audiences would embrace it as fully as her Latin fanbase. This blend of unrealized promise and stylistic variety made Dreaming of You a cultural landmark, even for those who felt it fell short as a definitive artistic statement.

==== Modern critical views ====
Dreaming of You received widespread acclaim by modern critics who hailed it as both a heartfelt tribute to Selena's legacy and a landmark in her crossover into the American pop mainstream. (Note: Attributed to multiple references:) Critics at The Los Angeles Times called its release historic, praising its inspired blend of original pop and R&B cuts with her most memorable Tejano and cumbia tracks, and an unfinished materspiece that invites listeners to imagine the career Selena might have had. For The Times's Alex Zaragoza, Selena fulfilled her vision of breaking into the mainstream with Dreaming of You. For many Americans outside South Texas, it served as their first introduction to Selena, heralded as a "blockbuster" success, while critics believed it hinted strongly at her promise.

Reviewers consistently praised Selena's versatility, highlighting her effortless movement across a broad spectrum of musical styles. (Note: Attributed to multiple references:) Dreaming of You was seen as moving from soulful ballads to energetic dance-pop, with rancheras, flamenco, cumbia, mariachi, and upbeat pop tied together by sumptuous ballads. Writing in Spin, Eddy described it as musically varied, ranging from reggae-infused sing-alongs to arena-ready ballads and mariachi stylings. Emily Sagen of University Wire noted Selena's ability to connect deeply with listeners, weaving personal and universal themes across R&B, soul, cumbia, and rock. Musicologist Stan Brekenridge observed that she fused early 1990s production trends–lush orchestration, syncopated guitar and bass, and call-and-response backing vocals–with her ethnic roots.

Several critics noted that Dreaming of You's polished production brought both strengths and compromises. (Note: Attributed to multiple references:) Frank Hoffman wrote in his Encyclopedia of Recorded Sound that producers softened her ethnic edge and added techno and hip-hop elements. Author Gary Graff felt this tempered the raw passion of her past work, though Newsweek's Tim Baker saw the release as marking a refined style influenced by hip-hop and R&B. Breckenridge praised Selena's ability to merge contemporary trends with her heritage, while Corcoran believed the heightened attention from her death boosted sales but did not overshadow her vocal prowess.

Critics often described Dreaming of You as a bittersweet testament–at once a celebration of her artistry and a reminder of unrealized potential. (Note: Attributed to multiple references:) The collection served as a reflective anthology of her cumbia-infused balladry and Tex-Mex roots while signaling her artistric evolution. It blended English and Spanish tracks to showcase her range and introduce her globally, offering new listeners a taste of her mariachi and cumbia mastery. Houston Chronicle's Joey Guerra called it the work of a singer at her vocal peak, capable of being sensual yet wholesome, and credited it with casting Tejano music into the mainstream. Judy Cantor-Navas of UDiscoverMusic described it as brimming with unrealized promise, its mix of cultural fidelity and creative daring making it impossible not to feel both uplifted and wistful. Biographer Tim Baker wrote that it served as an exemplary introduction and confirmed her as the foremost Latin artist of the 1990s.

=== Accolades ===
On November 23, 1995, Freddie Martinez noted that some Grammy panelists believed Dreaming of You had a strong chance of reaching the final ballot in the Pop category. Tom Roland of The Tennessean predicted a nomination for Album of the Year. Burr remarked on the absence of the album from the Grammy nominations, particularly in the Mexican American category. Industry reports indicated that Dreaming of You did not meet the linguistic requirements for the Latin categories, prompting EMI Latin to submit it in the Pop field, where it did not garner enough votes to advance. The album went on to receive Outstanding Album at the 1995 NCLR Bravo Awards. Abraham accepted the award with the Barrio Boyzz performing an a cappella at the event. At the 1996 Tejano Music Awards, it won Album of the Year; "I Could Fall in Love" received the Tejano Crossover Song of the Year, "Tú Sólo Tú" was awarded Song of the Year, and A.B. was named Record Producer of the Year. Selena was recognized as Female Vocalist of the Year and Female Entertainer of the Year, and along with Los Dinos, won Showband and International Crossover Band of the Year. At the 1996 Latin Billboard Music Awards, Dreaming of You earned Female Pop Album of the Year, and "Tú Sólo Tú" won Hot Latin Song of the Year. In the Chicago Tribune's Kiddies Awards, Chicago-area children selected Selena as one of their favorite artists and Dreaming of You as a favorite album. At the 1997 Tejano Music Awards, "I'm Getting Used to You" was nominated for Video of the Year. Golde and Snow received a Broadcast Music Incorporated (BMI) Pop Music Award for their work on "Dreaming of You". Dreaming of You has since appeared on multiple outlet rankings, including the Dallas Observer, The Guardian, and Houston Chronicle's lists as one of the greatest posthumous albums, HMV ranked it number two on their list of the top 10 world albums, while KGSR ranked Dreaming of You as one of their top albums of 1995.

== Commercial performance ==
Sigerson expressed full confidence in Dreaming of You's commercial success, with Burr predicting a top-10 debut on the Billboard 200, and a 50% chance at number one. Behar expected it to surpass the sales of Selena's previous works, noting that while her death heightened attention, her large fan base existed long before, and the music "stands on its own." Though Tejano music had long fused cultures and styles, it had yet to break into mainstream U.S. pop charts. By July 11, pre-orders for Dreaming of You reached 1.5 million copies, with projections it could set records as the most successful debut by a Latin artist and rival Michael Jackson's recent release, driven in part by the public's heightened awareness after her death.

Anticipation for Dreaming of You was immense, with critics calling it 1995's most awaited release and the first Selena album for most English-speaking listeners; many stores stocked substantial quantities in anticipation of demand. (Note: Anticipation, first album for English-speakers, store stocks.) Following Selena's death, U.S. retailers, spurred by her success, expanded or added Latin music offerings and hired dedicated customer service representatives at Camelot, Best Buy, Musicland, and Blockbuster Music. In July 1995, U.S. music sales lagged despite a strong June lineup; Lannert expected sales to rise once Dreaming of You launched. The label shipped 1.8 million copies, had 400,000 backordered, and added 500,000 more to meet demand. Retailers across Texas implemented reservation systems and offered special pricing and discount coupons, predicting sellouts within days. (Note: Attributed to multiple references:) Major retailers began competing with independent music stores, offering extended hours and deeper discounts, while release parties were scheduled statewide. (Note: San Antonio, Dallas, and San Angelo,) Several retailers across the U.S. began selling Dreaming of You early, while store managers alleged that competitors were breaking the date, prompting them to follow suit, while frustrated retailers criticized EMI's staggered distribution. Upon release, sales erupted nationwide. Music stores in Arizona, California, Hispanic-heavy neighborhoods in New Jersey and New York, and several cities in Texas, as well as major chains such as Tower Records in Austin, Walmart in Abilene, and Hastings Books warehouse, sold out their supply within hours after opening. (Note: Austin and Tower Records, Brazosport, Hastings Book warehouse, Abilene Walmart, California, Arizona, Hispanic-heavy New Jersey and New York, San Antonio, Rio Grande Valley.) While some stores across the U.S. reported nearly emptied shelves or unprecedented sells, (Note: Attributed to multiple references:) some regions of the U.S. reported marginal or sluggish sales. Some music stores reported Dreaming of You outselling Michael Jackson's release, Juan Gabriel, Garth Brooks and U2, or noted that its release generated no other comparable excitement or foot traffic. Waiting lists were implemented in Santa Anna following dwindling stocks, while Dreaming of You was the best-selling album in the Tidewater Region of Virginia, Petoskey, Michigan, Phoenix, Arizona, and remained the best-selling album in Southern California from July through December 1995. Observers analyzed the demographic makeup of buyers, noting strong support from Latino audiences alongside surprising interest from White Americans, particularly in non-Latin-focused retail environments. (Note: Attributed to multiple references:) Best Buy called it an eye-opener, noting that it exceeded expectations and signaled Latin music's potential. Best Buy stores in New York sold 23,000 units on its first day of availability, more than Michael Jackson's release. Dreaming of You was the best-selling album for Blockbuster, Best Buy, Warehouse Music, Hastings, Anderson Music Stores, and Musicland.

Dreaming of You sold 175,000 copies on its first day of availability, a then-record for a female artist in U.S. history, surpassing Mariah Carey's Music Box (1993) record, and registering the highest single-day launch figures ever achieved by a Hispanic artist. It sold 331,155 copies its first week, (Note: While the majority of sources compiled from Billboard reported 331,000 copies, Neilsen reported the actual number to be 331,155 units.) debuting at number one on the Billboard 200 chart, becoming the first predominantly Spanish-language album to do so. According to Hits magazine, the album sold 372,900 copies in its first week of release, debuting and peaking at number one on their Top 50 Albums chart. Selena became the first Tejano artist to reach number one on the Billboard 200 chart; its editors called it "jaw-dropping" and "stunning", while Newsweek called it historic, the Calgary Herald called it a musical milestone, and The Guardian wrote that it demonstrated her appeal to a wide and diverse audience. Dreaming of You's debut at number one was the second-biggest story in Latin music in 1995, surpassed only by the news of her death. The album became the second-fastest selling female album behind Janet Jackson's .janet (1993), which sold 350,000 units, and the second-highest sales of 1995, trailing Michael Jackson's HIStory: Past, Present and Future: Book I, and registered the largest-first week sales by a Hispanic performer. According to Billboard, its debut cemented it as one of the top 10 biggest debuts ever registered, and the best-selling debut by a female artist. Billboard's Mayfield doubted Selena would've achieved the milestone if she lived, while Verna, nonetheless, believed it could've been her crossover breakthrough.

Dreaming of You became Selena's biggest single sales week of her career, surpassing Amor Prohibido's 36,000 units sold in one week in May 1995. According to Nielsen, Dreaming of You sold 31,000 copies its first week in Houston alone. Behar estimated that Dreaming of You sold more than 700,000 copies, noting that SoundScan's figure does not include small shops, including independent Latin music stores. Nielsen acknowledged some methodological limits, but disputed Behar's claims, saying 85% of surveyed music retailers include individually owned stores, with the rest estimated. The album marked the first time a Latin artist debuted at number one, the first time a female Hispanic artist had topped the Billboard 200 with a bilingual album, the first posthumous release by a solo artist to peak at number one since Jim Croce in 1974, and holds the Guinness World Records for the first Latin solo artist to debut at number one on the Billboard 200, the first solo posthumous number one debut, and the first female vocalist to reach number one with a Spanish-language album. It became the first posthumous album by a Hispanic artist to debut and peak at number one on the Billboard 200, and the first album by EMI Latin to reach the top spot. Dreaming of You debuted at number one on the Top Latin Albums chart, registering the largest single sales week in the chart's history, remaining atop for nine consecutive months, and, by 2023, at 42 consecutive weeks, it ranked as the fifth most weeks an album stayed atop the chart. The album ended 1995 as the best-selling Latin and Latin pop album, securing Selena as the best-selling Latin and Latin pop artist. Selena dominated Billboard's year-end rankings, claiming the top spot in ten categories-an unprecedented feat that Lannert believes may never be matched, which powered EMI Latin to top 16 of Billboard's 33-year-end categories.

The album's international release strategy included staggered dates across Europe and Asia to maintain focus on Selena's music rather than her death. In Mexico, record stores noted a steady influx of inquiries and requests for the album. In Monterrey, retailers sold 70% of their stock on the first day, prompting multiple reorders. EMI Music Mexico received reorder requests from Monterrey, Guadalajara, and Tijuana. Dreaming of You sold 135,000 copies in its first week in Mexico, going double platinum in the country, selling 200,000 units by March 1996. In the U.K., Alan Jackson of The Times noted that Selena's breakthrough in the country would be difficult, in comparison to her success in America. In Canada, Dreaming of You was certified gold by Music Canada in December 1995. It sold over a million copies within two months in the U.S., and by year's end, Dreaming of You sold 1.66 million copies, and sold 2.5 million copies worldwide by March 1996. It reached sales of three million worldwide by June 1996. Dreaming of You sold 1.8 million copies by April 1996, and ended the year as the best-selling Latin and Latin pop album, selling 450,000 units. By February 1997, Dreaming of You sold two million copies in the U.S. Following the theatrical release of Selena (1997) and the second anniversary of the singer's death, Dreaming of You reclaimed the number one position on the Top Latin Albums chart for the first time since May 18, 1996. Dreaming of You sold 190,000 units in 1997, and in July 1998, was certified triple platinum by the Recording Industry Association of America (RIAA), denoting three million shipped units. The album sold 250,500 units in 1998, and 170,000 units in 1999. By December 2009, Dreaming of You sold 2.89 million copies in the U.S. and ranked as the seventh best-selling posthumous album. By 2015, Dreaming of You sold five million worldwide. By October 2017, it had sold 2.942 million copies and was ranked as the top-selling Latin album of the last 25 years. In April 2025, the RIAA updated its certification of Dreaming of You to 62x platinum, denoting 3.72 million album-equivalent units sold, retaining its rank as the highest-certified Latin album in the U.S. According to Jones, she suggested that the updated figure RIAA provided may be low, calling out Neilsen's limitations in its coverage of small shops. Dreaming of You remained the only mostly Spanish-language album to peak at number one until Il Divo's Ancora (2006), and the only album by a Hispanic woman to debut at number one until Karol G's Manana Sera Bonito in 2024. Dreaming of You remains the best-selling Latin album of all time, and the best-selling Tejano album of all time.

== Impact ==
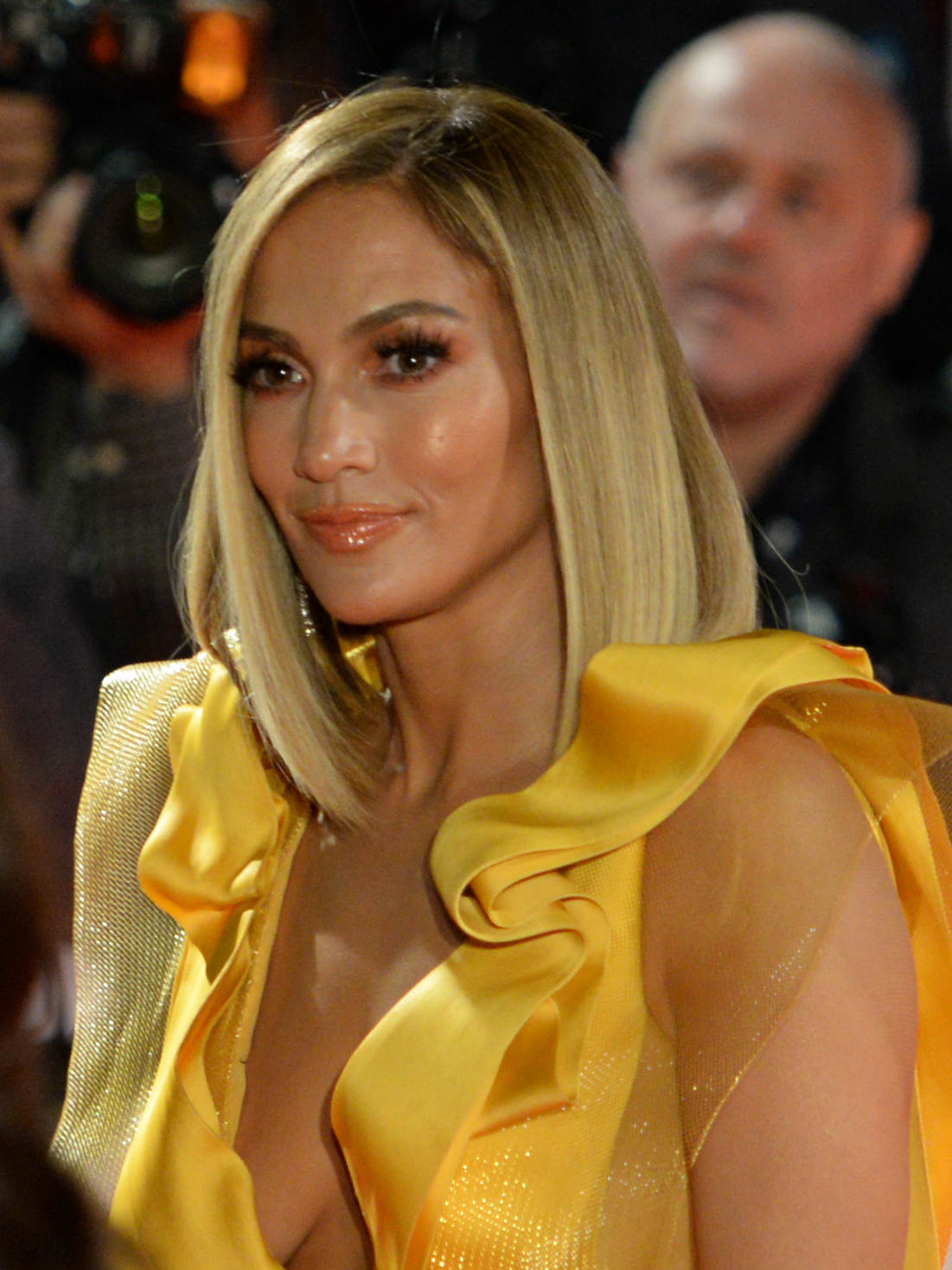
Jennifer Lopez (pictured) emerged as one of the chief beneficiaries of the commercial success of Dreaming of You, a milestone that helped ignite the late 1990s Latin pop explosion in the United States.

Dreaming of You marked the culmination of Selena's entry into the American market, serving as her breakthrough to the U.S. pop mainstream and the first Tejano album to achieve such success. It became a household name-maker for Selena, while Nicolas Kanellos singled out Dreaming of You's debut at number one on the Billboard 200 as one of the extraordinary achievements by Hispanics in the last 500 years. It introduced Tejano music to populations unfamiliar with the genre, and solidified Selena as a consummate bilingual artist and embodiment of the American Dream. Selena's death became a symbol of an unrealized crossover into full cultural integration. Her life and career have been commemorated through popular culture, shaping a narrative of a Latin music singer poised on the brink of mainstream stardom. Dreaming of You has been seen as a symbolic marker of the Latino capacity to bridge class divides between White American society and Latino communities, and as a cultural rapprochement between the Hispanic population and the broader American tapestry. Corporate America leveraged Selena's burgeoning crossover status, and her success became a defining feature of 1990s U.S. pop culture. Its debut at number one on the Billboard 200 prompted Senator Kay Bailey Hutchison to hail the album as a courageous and pioneering effort to bring Tejano music to mainstream visibility, thereby cementing Selena as a transformative figure in American music history.

The commercial and cultural impact of Dreaming of You has earned it a reputation as the definitive starting point for the modern Latin crossover movement and secured its status as a seminal release of its generation. Selena's phenomenon validated Latino market strategists' claims that the U.S. Hispanic demographic was a powerful economic constituency. Music executives saw proof of a growing Latin music audience following Dreaming of You's commercial success, paving the way for the late 1990s Latin pop explosion led by Jennifer Lopez, Ricky Martin, Marc Anthony, Enrique Iglesias, Thalía, and Shakira, while its success forshadowed Christina Aguilera's entry into Spanish from English, and Full Force's opportunity to work with a then-unknown Backstreet Boys. (Note: Attributed to multiple references: Christina Aguilera, Backstreet Boys.) Dreaming of You's warm reception demonstrated Latin music's commercial potential and catalyzed a revival that also benefited the dance craze of the "Macarena" (1996). Beyond sales, the album's impact extended into other cultural products, including mentions in her biopic and literary works from Melissa Lozada-Oliva and scholar Deborah Paredez's concept of "Selenidad", while Selena's struggles to secure and record the album were chronicled in Netflix's Selena: The Series (2020–21). (Note: Her biopic, works by Lozada-Oliva, and Paredez.) Dreaming of You was named one of the Gulf Coast's most essential recordings, while Burr and Lannert believed Selena's collaboration with its producers suggested the potential to reshape the Latino music scene.

While Selena's rise brought unprecedented attention to Tejano music, critics questioned whether the genre could sustain its national presence without her. Her success overshadowed other female Tejano singers, and despite her chart dominance in 1995, no other female Tejano vocalist matched her impact. Tejano music—which she had thrust into the mainstream market—experienced a decline in popularity in the wake of her death, and Tejano albums that didn't bear Selena's name was struggling to sell. In 1999, Burr predicted that the genre would see a revival, however, as of 2019, the genre remains in obscurity, with Selena remaining the sole visible musician on music charts through the 2020s.

== Track listing ==
Dreaming of You – Standard edition
No.	Title	Writer(s)	Producer(s)	Length
1.	"I Could Fall in Love"	Keith Thomas; Selena Quintanilla–Pérez	Thomas	4:41
2.	"Captive Heart"	Mark Goldenberg; Kit Hain	Guy Roche	4:23
3.	"I'm Getting Used to You"	Diane Warren	Rhett Lawrence	4:02
4.	"God's Child (Baila Conmigo)"	David Byrne; Selena	Byrne; Arto Lindsay; Susan Rogers	4:14
5.	"Dreaming of You"	Franne Golde; Tom Snow	Roche	5:14
6.	"Missing My Baby" (featuring Full Force)	A.B. Quintanilla	A.B.; Full Force	4:13
7.	"Amor Prohibido"	A.B.; Pete Astudillo	A.B.	2:55
8.	"Wherever You Are (Donde Quiera Que Estés)" (featuring the Barrio Boyzz)	Miguel Marco Flores; Karl Cameron Porter; Desmond Child	Porter	4:28
9.	"Techno Cumbia"	Astudillo; A.B.	A.B.	4:43
10.	"El Toro Relajo"	Felipe Bermejo	José Hernández	2:19
11.	"Como la Flor"	Astudillo; A.B.	A.B.	3:51
12.	"Tú Sólo Tú"	Felipe Valdés Leal	Hernández	3:12
13.	"Bidi Bidi Bom Bom"	Selena; A.B.; Astudillo	A.B.	3:40
Total length:				51:47

Dreaming of You – Japanese edition
No.	Title	Writer(s)	Producer(s)	Length
14.	"Sukiyaki"	Rokusuke Ei; Hachidai Nakamura; Janice-Marie Johnson; Abraham Quintanilla; Astudillo	A.B.	2:59
Total length:				54:46

Dreaming of You – 20 Years of Music edition
No.	Title	Writer(s)	Producer(s)	Length
14.	"Spoken Liner Notes"	A.B.; Suzette Quintanilla; Chris Pérez; Astudillo; Ricky Vela; Abraham	Suzette	17:30
15.	"Dreaming of You" (music video)	Golde; Snow	Suzette	5:15
Total length:				1:08:57

== Personnel ==
Credits are adapted from the liner notes of Dreaming of You.

Recording locations

- Recorded and engineered at The Bennett House (track 1), Bananaboat Studio (tracks 2 and 5) Oakshire Records (track 3) Clinton Studios (track 4) Q-Productions (tracks 4 and 6–7, 9–13) Sorcerer Sound (track 8) WorldBeat Recordings (track 8) and Cherokee Studios (tracks 10 and 12)
- Mixed at The Bennet House (track 1), Conway Studios (tracks 2–3, and 5) Clinton Studios (track 4) Q-Productions (tracks 6–7, 11, and 13) and Sound Lab Studios (track 9)
- Management – Abraham Quintanilla

Personnel

- Selena Quintanilla–Pérez – lead vocals (tracks 1–13), Spanish lyrics (tracks 1 and 4), background vocals,(tracks 2 and 3) composer (track 13)
- Keith Thomas – composer, synthesizer, bass programmer (track 1)
- Bill Whittington – recording, mixer (track 1)
- Mike Corbett – engineer (track 1)
- Todd Moore – production (track 1)
- Mark Hammond – drum programmer (track 1)
- Tommy Sims – bass (track 1)
- Dann Huff – guitars (track 1)
- Trey Lorenz – background vocals (track 1)
- Kit Hain – composer (track 2)
- Mark Goldenberg – composer (track 2)
- Guy Roche – producer,(tracks 2–3 and 5) drum programmer, keyboards, synthesizer (track 2)
- Nathaniel "Mick" Guzuaski – mixer (tracks 2–3 and 5)
- Mario Luccy – engineer (tracks 2 and 5)
- Brian "Red" Moore – engineer (tracks 2 and 5) recording, mixer (tracks 6–7, 9, 11, and 13)
- Moana Suchard – engineer (tracks 2 and 5)
- Neil Stubenhauss – bass (track 2)
- Art Meza – percussion (tracks 2, 7, 9, 11, and 13)
- Delphine – synth programmer (track 2)
- Donna Delorey – background vocals (track 2)
- Marc Antoine guitar (track 2)
- Diane Warren – composer (track 3)
- Dan Garcia – engineer (track 3)
- Carl Harris Jr. – engineer (track 3)
- Rhett Lawrence – producer, synthesizers, drums, programmer (track 3)
- Luis Conte – percussion (track 3)
- Jerry Hey – horns (track 3)
- Dan Higgens – horns (track 3)
- Gary Grant – horns (track 3)
- Bill Reichenbac – horns (track 3)
- Joanie Smith – production (track 3)
- Chris Kohler – computer tech (track 3)
- David Byrne – composer, producer, vocals, guitar, harmonium, percussion (track 4)
- Arto Lindsay – producer (track 4)
- Susan Rogers – producer, engineer (track 4)
- Paul Socolow – bass (track 4)
- Tood Turkisher – drums (track 4)
- Valerie Naranjo – marimba (track 4)
- Michael Brauer – mixer (track 4)
- Franne Golde – composer (track 5)
- Tom Snow – composer (track 5)
- Full Force – vocals, background vocals, producer, keyboards, drum programmer,(track 6) mixer (track 9)
- A.B. Quintanilla – producer, composer, bass (tracks 6, 7, 9, 11, and 13)
- Ricky Vela – keyboards,(tracks 6, 7, 9, 11, and 13) drum programmer (track 6)
- Joe Ojeda – keyboards (tracks 6, 7, 9, 11, and 13)
- Chris Pérez – guitar (tracks 6, 7, 9, 11, and 13)
- Suzette Quintanilla – drums (tracks 6, 7, 9, 11, and 13)
- Gerry E. Brown – mixer (track 6)
- Kurt Lundvall – engineer (track 6)
- Bill Molina – digital editing (track 6)
- Nick Moroch – guitar (track 6)
- Pete Astudillo – composer (tracks 7, 9, 11, and 13)
- Manuel Hernandez – lyrical translations (tracks 7, 9, 11, and 13)
- The Barrio Boyzz – vocals (track 8)
- Karl Cameron Porter – composer, producer, engineer (track 8)
- Miguel Marco Flores – composer (track 8)
- Desmond Child – English lyrics (track 8)
- Tim Conklin – engineer (track 8)
- Perry Tembelis – engineer (track 8)
- Tony Peluso – mixer (track 8)
- Mike Aarvold – mixer (track 8)
- Pete Diorio – mixer (track 9)
- Felipe Bermejo – composer (track 10)
- Maria Grever – lyrical translation (tracks 10 and 12)
- José Hernández – producer (tracks 10 and 12)
- Mariachi Sol de México – chorus (track 10 and 12)
- Bruce Robb – engineer (track 10 and 12)
- Felipe Valdés Leal – composer (track 12)
- Nancy Brennan – A&R
- José Behar – art direction
- Barbie Insua – art direction
- Margo Chase – package design
- Brian Hunt – package design
- Maruice Rinaldi – photography

== Charts ==
=== Weekly charts ===
Weekly chart performance for Dreaming of You
Chart (1995)	Peak position
Canada (RPM)	16
Mexico (Disco Mexico)	1
Singapore (SPVA)	8
US Billboard 200	1
US Top Latin Albums (Billboard)	1
US Latin Pop Albums (Billboard)	1
US Top 100 Albums (Cashbox)	1
US Top 50 Albums (Hits)	1
Chart (1996)	Peak position
Canada (RPM)	70
US Billboard 200	53
US Top Latin Albums (Billboard)	1
US Latin Pop Albums (Billboard)	1
US Top 100 Albums (Cashbox)	44
US Top 100 Albums (Cashbox)	4
Chart (1997)	Peak position
US Billboard 200	136
US Top Latin Albums (Billboard)	1
US Latin Pop Albums (Billboard)	1
Chart (1998)	Peak position
US Top Catalog Albums (Billboard)	11
US Top Latin Catalog Albums (Billboard)	1
Chart (2025)	Peak position
US Top Album Sales (Billboard)	8
US Top Latin Albums (Billboard)	14
US Latin Pop Albums (Billboard)	1
US Vinyl Albums (Billboard)	4

=== Year-end charts ===
Year-end chart performance for Dreaming of You
Chart (1995)	Position
US Billboard 200 (Billboard)	44
US Top Latin Albums (Billboard)	1
US Latin Pop Albums (Billboard)	1
US Top 100 Albums (Cashbox)	29
US Top 50 Albums (Hits)	22
Chart (1996)	Position
US Billboard 200	123
US Top Latin Albums (Billboard)	1
US Latin Pop Albums (Billboard)	1
Chart (1997)	Position
US Top Latin Catalog Albums (Billboard)	3
US Top Latin Albums (Billboard)	7
US Latin Pop Albums (Billboard)	5
Chart (1998)	Position
US Top Latin Album Sales (Billboard)	3
US Top Latin Catalog Albums (Billboard)	1
Chart (1999)	Position
US Top Latin Catalog Albums (Billboard)	1

=== Quarterly charts ===
Quarterly chart performance for Dreaming of You
Chart (1997)	Peak position
US Top Latin Albums (Billboard)	4

== Certifications and sales ==
Region	Certification	Certified units/sales
Canada (Music Canada)	Gold	50,000^{^}
Mexico (AMPROFON)	2× Platinum	500,000^{^}
United States (RIAA)	62× Platinum (Latin)	3,720,000^{‡}
Summaries
Worldwide	—	5,000,000
^{^} Shipments figures based on certification alone.^{‡} Sales+streaming figures based on certification alone.

== See also ==
- 1995 in Latin music
- List of works published posthumously
- List of number-one Billboard Top Latin Albums from the 1990s
- List of number-one Billboard Latin Pop Albums from the 1990s
- List of Billboard 200 number-one albums of 1995
- List of best-selling Latin albums
- List of best-selling Latin albums in the United States
- Latin American music in the United States

== Works cited ==
- Anon. (August 8, 1987). "Hot Latin Songs > August 8, 1987". Billboard.
- Anon. (June 3, 1989). "First Album In The Works". El Paso Times – via Newspapers.com.
- Anon. (March 23, 1991). "Regional Mexican Albums > March 23, 1991". Billboard.
- Anon. (November 15, 1993). "Cornering The Market". Thousand Oaks Star – via Newspapers.com.
- Anon. (August 28, 1994). "Selena To Perform During Fiestas Patrias". The Seguin Gazette-Enterprise – via Newspapers.com.
- Anon. (April 2, 1995). "Fan Club Founder Arrested In Killing". Simi Valley Star – via Newspapers.com.
- Anon. (December 21, 1995b). "Music Canada Gold & Platinum". Musiccanada.com.
- Anon. (April 4, 1995c). "Selena Leaves A Great Legacy". Bryan-College Station Eagle – via Newspapers.com.
- Anon. (April 20, 1995d). "July Release Eyed". The Orange Leader – via Newspapers.com.
- Anon. (June 17, 1995k). "Selena's Single". Los Angeles Times – via Newspapers.com.
- Anon. (June 17, 1995j). "Selena Fills Texas Airwaves Again". Longview News-Journal – via Newspapers.com.
- Anon. (June 17, 1995i). "Texans Love Song In English By Slain Selena". Orlando Sentinel – via Newspapers.com.
- Anon. (June 21, 1995l). "People". The Sault Star – via Newspapers.com.
- Anon. (July 4, 1995o). "Selena Album Debuts". El Paso Times – via Newspapers.com.
- Anon. (July 12, 1995m). "English Selena Record Ready". Waterloo Region Record – via Newspapers.com.
- Anon. (July 13, 1995n). "Bootleggers Waste No Time With Selena Album". Bryan-College Station Eagle – via Newspapers.com.
- Anon. (July 14, 1995p). "Selena's Album Due". Abilene Reporter-News – via Newspapers.com.
- Anon. (July 18, 1995q). "Selena Album Out Today". The Gazette – via Newspapers.com.
- Anon. (July 19, 1995r). "Selena's Album May Realize Her Crossover Dream". Pensacola News Journal – via Newspapers.com.
- Anon. (July 19, 1995s). "Selena CD Release Storms Salinas Music Stores". The Californian – via Newspapers.com.
- Anon. (July 22, 1995x). "It Takes Innocence To Transcend The Commonplace In Pop". Anchorage Daily News – via Newspapers.com.
- Anon. (July 22, 1995w). "Musica". La Prensa (in Spanish) – via Newspapers.com.
- "Destaca en EU disco de Selena". El Norte (in Spanish). July 24, 1995. ProQuest 316384872.
- Anon. (July 27, 1995y). "Record Review". Clarion-Ledger – via Newspapers.com.
- Anon. (July 28, 1995z). "Triumph And Tragedy". Hartford Courant – via Newspapers.com.
- "Newsmakers". Houston Chronicle. July 29, 1995 – via Newsbank.
- "New York's Hot 25 Albums > July 30, 1995". Newsday. July 30, 1995 – via Newspapers.com.
- Anon. (August 4, 1995). "Top 10 Locally". Daily Press – via Newspapers.com.
- "Late Singer's Multicultural Effort Mixed". Phoenix Gazette. August 20, 1995. ProQuest 246041005.
- "Catalogo Nacional-Internacional > Agosto Venta". Disco Mexico (214). August 1995.
- "Top 100 Albums > August 12, 1995" (PDF). Cashbox. Vol. 58, no. 48. August 12, 1995.
- "The Year That Rocked 1995". The Courier-Journal. November 24, 1995h – via Newspapers.com.
- "Top 100 Albums > October 30, 1995". RPM. Vol. 62, no. 13. October 30, 1995. Archived from the original on May 18, 2015.
- "Top Albums & Artists of 1995" (PDF). Cashbox. 58 (18). December 30, 1995.
- Anon. (January 8, 1996b). "Top Albums Of '95". New York Daily News – via Newspapers.com.
- "Top 10 Albums of the Week". The Straits Times. November 18, 1995.
- Anon. (December 23, 1995a). "Billboard 200 Year-end Chart for 1995" (PDF). Billboard. Vol. 107, no. 51.
- Anon. (January 4, 1996). "The '95 KGSR Music Poll". Austin American-Statesman – via Newspapers.com.
- Anon. (January 13, 1996c). "Beatles Anthology Sells 800,000 Units In Canada". The Times-Transcript – via Newspapers.com.
- Anon. (January 20, 1996p). "Top 100 Albums > January 20, 1996" (PDF). Cashbox. 60 (19).
- Anon. (January 27, 1996o). "Top Latin Albums > January 27, 1996" (PDF). Cashbox. 60 (20).
- Anon. (February 27, 1996e). "Who Do You Love?". Chicago Tribune – via Newspapers.com.
- Anon. (March 24, 1996f). "Selena, Other Musicians Honored At 1996 Awards". Bryan-College Station Eagle – via Newspapers.com.
- Anon. (March 22, 1996g). "Florida Singles > March 22, 1996". The Palm Beach Post – via Newspapers.com.
- Anon. (April 27, 1996h). "Top 10 Records > April 27, 1996". Waco Tribune-Herald – via Newspapers.com.
- Anon. (April 27, 1996i). "Hot Spins > July 12, 1996". The Miami Herald – via Newspapers.com.
- Anon. (December 28, 1996l). "1996: The Year In Music". Billboard. Vol. 108, no. 52.
- Anon. (1996m). "Top 50 Albums of the Year" (PDF). Hits.
- Anon. (January 8, 1996n). "Top 100 Albums > January 8, 1996". RPM. Vol. 62, no. 21. Archived from the original on March 17, 2016.
- Anon. (January 13, 1996q). "Billboard 200 > January 13, 1996". Billboard. Vol. 108, no. 2.
- Anon. (April 20, 1996r). "Bubbling Under Hot 100 > April 20, 1996". Billboard. Vol. 108, no. 16.
- Anon. (March 12, 1997). "'Selena' Movie Set To Debut This Week". Victoria Advocate – via Newspapers.com.
- Anon. (December 27, 1997c). "1997: The Year In Music". Billboard. Vol. 109, no. 52.
- Anon. (1998). Encyclopedia of World Biography – via General OneFile.
- Anon. (May 23, 1998b). "Top Catalog Albums > May 23, 1998". Billboard.
- Anon. (April 1, 2002). "Selena Still Latin Music Standard". Tampa Bay Times – via Newspapers.com.
- Anon. (September 13, 2002c). "セレーナ / 眠れない夜 [廃盤]". CDJournal.com (in Japanese).
- Anon. (September 10, 2004). "Jose Hernandez To Headline Concerto Latino In Banning". Record-Gazette – via Newspapers.com.
- Anon. (April 6, 2005). "Selena Remains Tejano Music Icon". The Odessa American – via Newspapers.com.
- Anon. (August 12, 2005b). "BDS certifications July 2005". Billboard Radio Monitor – via Gale Research.
- Anon. (November 26, 2008). "Selena: Biography". Biography. A&E.
- Anon. (March 31, 2015b). "Selena's Legacy". The Monitor – via Newspapers.com.
- Anon. (November 30, 2016). "Voices from the grave: 20 great posthumously released albums". Chron.com.
- Anon. (March 30, 2021). "Chris Pérez recordó la trágica muerte de su esposa Selena Quintanilla: "Fue traumático, extraño su rostro, su risa"". Infobae (in Spanish). ProQuest 2507510555.
- Anon. (March 9, 2024). "Karol G Notches Historic Award Win". Daily Press – via Newspapers.com.
- Anon. (May 13, 2025). "First Time Ever Two Spanish-Language Titles Lead Billboard 200". LATV. Archived from the original on August 15, 2025.
- Anon. (April 21, 2025b). "The Recording Industry Association of America (RIAA) Gold & Platinum". RIAA.com.
- Anon. (August 30, 2025c). "Top Latin Albums > August 30, 2025". Billboard.
- Anon. (August 30, 2025d). "Latin Pop Albums > August 30, 2025". Billboard.
- Anon. (August 30, 2025e). "Top Vinyl Records > August 30, 2025". Billboard.
- Alexander, Brandye (July 28, 1995). "Selena: Album Returns To Her English-Language Roots". The Modesto Bee – via Newspapers.com.
- Andrews, Mark (July 28, 1995). "Selena Loses Something In The Translation". The Oregonian. ProQuest 416905148.
- Arnold, Michael (August 26, 1995). "Alan Jones Talking Music" (PDF). Music Week. ISSN 0265-1548.
- Amendola, Christine (September 24, 1999). "Family Was A Guiding Force In Selena's Life". Calgary Herald – via Newspapers.com.
- Anderman, Joan (November 7, 1999). "Can Latin Music Keep Up The Heat?". The Boston Globe – via Newspapers.com.
- Arnold, Chuck (April 2, 2025). "How Selena's 'Dreaming of You' got a 'darker' change after her murder: producer". Nypost.com.
- Bailey, Rick (July 28, 1995). "Selena Album More Notable For Tejano Music". Lexington Herald-Leader – via Newspapers.com.
- Balandran, Isabella (September 17, 2015). "Lost Selena song found 20 years after her death". Los Angeles Times.
- Baker, Tim (2018). The Life and Legacy of Tejano's Queen. IBT Media.
- Bauder, David (July 27, 1995). "Posthumous Album Makes Selena A National Star". South Idaho Press – via Newspapers.com.
- Beckerman, Jim (July 30, 1995). "Selena Fever? Not In N.J.". The Record – via Newspapers.com.
- Belcher, Walt (December 24, 1995). "Awards Encourage Better Portrayals of Hispanics in TV, Movies, Music". The Tampa Tribune – via Newspapers.com.
- Bennett, Steve; Lopetegui, Enrique (July 16, 1995). "'Dreaming' Of Crossover Appeal". Los Angeles Times – via Newspapers.com.
- Beer, Lenny (July 31, 1995). "Top 50 Albums > July 31, 1995". Hits. 9 (453).
- Beshur, Alison (March 31, 2004). "Selena: Nine Years Later". Corpus Christi Caller-Times – via Newspapers.com.
- Blake, Joseph (August 24, 1995). "Pop Runs From Fun To Foul". Times Colonist – via Newspapers.com.
- Blumenthal, Howard J. (1997). The world music CD listener's guide. ISBN 9780823076635.
- Britt, Bruce (July 16, 1995). "'Dreaming Of You' Combines New Songs And Old Material". Ventura County Star – via Newspapers.com.
- Breckenridge, Stan L. (2016). Popular music in America : forging the American spirit. ISBN 978-0757532764.
- Brooks, Karen (May 23, 1995). "New Selena Album Due Out July 18". Corpus Christi Caller-Times – via Newspapers.com.
- Brooks, Karen (July 27, 1995b). "Selena's Album Hits No. 1". Corpus Christi Caller-Times – via Newspapers.com.
- Buckley, Daniel (July 20, 1995). "Selena's Album Has Us Dreaming Of Her". Tucson Citizen – via Newspapers.com.
- Burr, Ramiro (March 14, 1992). "The young turks of Tejano: a new generation is pushing the envelope". Billboard. Vol. 94, no. 11. Gale A12110939 – via Gale Research.
- Burr, Ramiro; Campbell, Elizabeth (April 15, 1994). "Mafia, Selena Top New Releases". Fort Worth Star-Telegram – via Newspapers.com.
- Burr, Ramiro (December 11, 1994b). "Good, bad, ugly meet at conference". San Antonio Express-News. ProQuest 261560706.
- Burr, Ramiro (December 10, 1993). "Selena Pursues Crossover Success With English Recordings". El Paso Times – via Newspapers.com.
- Burr, Ramiro (February 24, 1995). "Emilio, Selena Make A Tejano Dream Team". Fort Worth Star-Telegram – via Newspapers.com.
- Burr, Ramiro (March 24, 1995b). "Salsero Shines With The Right Producer". Fort Worth Star-Telegram – via Newspapers.com.
- Burr, Ramiro; Lannert, John (April 16, 1995). "EMI Set Honors Selena's Memory". Billboard. Vol. 107, no. 15.
- Burr, Ramiro (February 25, 1995c). "Selena Reigns At Tejano Awards". Billboard. Vol. 107, no. 8.
- Burr, Ramiro (June 2, 1995h). "New Selena CD To Offer New Songs, Old Hits". Fort Worth Star-Telegram – via Newspapers.com.
- Burr, Ramiro (June 3, 1995d). "Posthumous Certifications For Selena". Billboard. Vol. 107, no. 22.
- Burr, Ramiro (July 18, 1995s). "Selena CD Stirs Emotions, Sales Soar". Anderson Independent-Mail – via Newspapers.com.
- Burr, Ramiro (July 18, 1995i). "Selena crosses over to pop - Posthumous release a reminder of talent cut short". San Antonio Express-News – via Newsbank.
- Burr, Ramiro (January 12, 1996). "Exclusion Of Selena Was A Grammy Surprise". Fort Worth Star-Telegram – via Newspapers.com.
- Burr, Ramiro (March 31, 1996b). "Emilio, Selena Dominate Tejano Awards". Oakland Tribune – via Newspapers.com.
- Burr, Ramiro (1999). The Billboard Guide to Tejano and Regional Mexican Music. Billboard Books. ISBN 9780823076918.
- Burr, Ramiro; Shannon, Doug (2005). Encyclopedia Latina. Grolier Academic Reference. ISBN 9780717258161.
- Cabrera, Cloe (April 1, 1995c). "Mexican-American Singer Selena Killed". The Tampa Tribune – via Newspapers.com.
- Cabrera, Rene (June 16, 1995b). "Tejano Journal". Corpus Christi Caller-Times – via Newspapers.com.
- Cabrera, Rene (July 14, 1995d). "Stores Set For Release Of Selena CD". Corpus Christi Caller-Times – via Newspapers.com.
- Cabrera, Rene (July 17, 1995e). "Old And New Merge On Selena's New Album". Corpus Christi Caller-Times – via Newspapers.com.
- Cabrera, Cloe (August 11, 1995g). "Records". The Tampa Tribune – via Newspapers.com.
- Cabrera, Rene (November 24, 1995h). "Initial Judging For Latin Grammys Already Under Way". Corpus Christi Caller-Times – via Newspapers.com.
- Cabrera, Rene (May 3, 1996). "Selena, Astudillo Among Those Honored With BMI, Billboard Awards". Corpus Christi Caller-Times – via Newspapers.com.
- Cabrera, Rene (January 31, 1997). "Jennifer Pena Sweeps TMA Nominations". Corpus Christi Caller-Times – via Newspapers.com.
- Campbell, Chuck (August 4, 1995). "Selena's Crossover Comes Posthumously". The Knoxville News-Sentinel – via Newspapers.com.
- Campbell, Lauren (January 17, 1996). "On The Record". The Flint Journal – via Newspapers.com.
- Cantor-Navas, Judy (July 18, 2025). "'Dreaming Of You': Selena's Immortal Album". Udiscovermusic.com.
- Caputo, Salvatore (July 9, 1995). "Tejano Music Poised To Crash On Shore Of Mainstream Pop". The Arizona Republic – via Newspapers.com.
- Caputo, Salvatore (July 16, 1995b). "Inside Music". Star Tribune – via Newspapers.com.
- Carrizales, Sylvia M. (July 18, 2020). "Still 'Dreaming' with Selena 25 years later". Tejanonation.net.
- Catlin, Roger (July 16, 1995). "Selena's Dream Comes True, Posthumously". Hartford Courant – via Newspapers.com.
- Caulfield, Keith (August 25, 2025). "Conan Gray Scores First No. 1 on Top Album Sales Chart, Highest-Charting Album Ever on Billboard 200 With 'Wishbone'". Billboard.
- Chapman, Cindy Cullen (August 4, 1995). "Selena Sales Are So-So Here". The Gazette – via Newspapers.com.
- Ciabattari, Jane (July 2, 1995). "Selena's Living Legacy". The Republican – via Newspapers.com.
- Clark-Meads, Jeff (June 22, 1996). "Thorn EMI Posts Another Record Year". Billboard. Vol. 108, no. 25.
- Clark, Michael D. (March 26, 2000). "Dreaming Of What Might Have Been". The Houston Chronicle – via Newspapers.com.
- Clark, Walter Aaron (2002). From tejano to tango : Latin American popular music. ISBN 9780815336402.
- Cobo, Leila (October 19, 2002). "Singles Review". Billboard. Vol. 114, no. 42.
- Cobo, Leila (April 19, 2005). "Selena Tribute Concert Lives On". The Fresno Bee – via Newspapers.com.
- Colander, Pat; Gamble, Harry; Gaur, K.K. (April 4, 1995). "A Singer Cut Down". The Times – via Newspapers.com.
- Considine, J. D. (July 18, 1995). "Selena: Album Only Suggest Late Singer's Dream". The Baltimore Sun – via Newspapers.com.
- Corpus, Lorena (September 24, 1995). "Anuncian que lanzaran otro disco de Selena". El Norte (in Spanish). ProQuest 316363815.
- Corcoran, Michael; Guerrero, Stephanie (July 13, 1995). "Selena And The American Dream". Austin American-Statesman – via Newspapers.com.
- Corcoran, Michael (2005). All over the map : true heroes of Texas music. ISBN 1574416685.
- Cole, Patrick E. (July 10, 1995). "Old Rock, New Life". Time. Vol. 140, no. 2.
- Cortes Gonzalez, Maria (July 15, 1995b). "Posthumous CD Release Sends Fans Into A Selena Frenzy". El Paso Times – via Newspapers.com.
- Cortes Gonzalez, Maria (July 18, 1995c). "1,500 Selena Fans Pack El Paso CD Party". El Paso Times – via Newspapers.com.
- Cragg, Michael (December 7, 2021). "From Prince to Joy Division: 10 of the best posthumous albums". The Guardian. ProQuest 2554242548.
- Crowell, Ed (July 13, 1995). "Selena's Legacy Lives On". Austin American-Statesman – via Newspapers.com.
- Dancis, Bruce (October 13, 1996). "Gone But Not Forgotten - An Album Guide". The Sacramento Bee – via Newspapers.com.
- Darling, Cary (July 16, 1995). "Hyper Machine In High Gear For Selena". The Odessa American – via Newspapers.com.
- Davis, David (March 25, 2004). "Corpus Christi Courts Tourists". The Charlotte Observer – via Newspapers.com.
- de la Torre, Chito (February 18, 1994). "Behind the scenes with AB Quintanilla". La Prensa. ProQuest 368510204.
- de la Torre, Chito (November 23, 1995). "Chito's Spotlight". La Prensa. ProQuest 368520597.
- DeKnock, Jane (October 19, 1995). "Carey Sets Off Chart Fireworks". The Odessa American – via Newspapers.com.
- Dollar, Steve (August 1, 1995). "'Dreaming Of You' Gives Glimpse Of Direction Of Singer's Career". The Atlanta Journal – via Newspapers.com.
- Dominguez, Robert (June 30, 1995). "Selena Still Selling Strong". Daily News – via Newspapers.com.
- Eddy, Chuck (February 1, 1996). "Music Reviews". LA Weekly – via Newspapers.com.
- Eddy, Chuck (September 7, 1995). "Recordings -- Dreaming of You by Selena". Rolling Stone. No. 716. ProQuest 220159847.
- Eddy, Chuck (September 1996b). "Culturas 'Simplemente Delia' Manny". Vibe. Vol. 7, no. 7.
- Eddy, Chuck (September 2011). "The result of a literal cultural mash-up, regional Mexican is pop's fluid frontier". Spin – via Gale Research.
- Erlewine, Stephen Thomas (1997). All music guide : the experts' guide to the best recordings from thousands of artists in all types of music. ISBN 9780879303310.
- Esparaza, Elia (March 2000). "When The Sun Shines in Corpus Christi". Estylo. 4 (2).
- Espinosa, Gastón (2008). Mexican American Religions: Spirituality, Activism, and Culture. Duke University Press. ISBN 9780822388951.
- Estevez, Marjua (July 17, 2015). "What Millennials Should Know About… Selena's 'Dreaming of You'". Vibe.com.
- Estevez, Marjua (October 17, 2017). "The Top 25 Biggest Selling Latin Albums of the Last 25 Years: Selena, Shakira & More". Billboard.
- Exposito, Suzy; Hernandez, Daniel; Martinez, Fidel; Reyes-Velarde, Alejandra (December 20, 2020). "Revisiting Selena's Landmark Crossover Album". Johnson City Press – via Newspapers.com.
- Evans, Crystal Duarte (September 3, 1998). "Business Needs Good Schools". The Atlanta Constitution – via Newspapers.com.
- Fernandez, Andres (August 20, 1995). "'Vuelan' discos de Selena". Reforma (in Spanish). ProQuest 311190890.
- Fernandez, Celia (December 4, 2020). "The 15 Best Selena Quintanilla Songs of All Time". Oprahdaily.com.
- Ferman, Dave (July 19, 1995). "Selena's Dreaming". Fort Worth Star-Telegram – via Newspapers.com.
- Flegel, Jamie (July 17, 1995). "Area Stores Gearing Up For Selena Disc Release". The Brazosport Facts – via Newspapers.com.
- Flegel, Jaime (July 19, 1995b). "Selena's English Album Hits Racks". The Brazosport Facts – via Newspapers.com.
- Flick, Larry (March 2, 1996). "Singles Reviews". Billboard. Vol. 108, no. 9.
- Finn, Timothy (November 26, 1999). "That Resounding Latin Beat". The Kansas City Star – via Newspapers.com.
- Freedberg, Michael (August 25, 1995). "Off The Record". Boston Phoenix. 34 (24).
- Freedom du Lac, J. (July 16, 1995). "'Dreaming Of You': R&B, Tejano, And More". The Sacramento Bee – via Newspapers.com.
- Galvan Kent, Yanalte (July 7, 1995). "Coincidencia Dramatica: "Quiero Morirme" Fue Lo Ultimo Que Grabo Selena". Furia Musical. Vol. 3, no. 14.
- Garay, Adriana (September 9, 1995). "'Queria grabar con mariachi'". Reforma (in Spanish). ProQuest 311189665.
- Garcia, Iker Seisdedos (March 31, 2025). "The queen of Tex-Mex". El Pais. ProQuest 3184887962.
- Garcia, James E. (May 5, 1994). "Selena: Glorious Madonna?". Austin American-Statesman – via Newspapers.com.
- Gettelman, Parry (July 28, 1995). "Selena". Orlando Sentinel – via Newspapers.com.
- Goad, Kimberly (October 30, 1994). "Toast Of Tejano". Chicago Tribune. ProQuest 283950297.
- Godines, Valeria; Stein, Steve (April 1, 1995). "Music Stores Report Selling Out Of Musician's Tapes, CDs". Corpus Christi Caller-Times – via Newspapers.com.
- Gonzalez, Fernando (July 16, 1995). "Crossover: An Obsolete Idea For Latinos?". The Miami Herald – via Newspapers.com.
- Gonzalez, Fernando (July 19, 1995b). "Posthumous Selena Album Put Together Hastily". The Miami Herald – via Newspapers.com.
- Gonzalez, Fernando (July 21, 1995d). "Collection By The Late Selena Disappoints". The State – via Newspapers.com.
- Gonzalez, Alberto (2000). Our voices : essays in culture, ethnicity, and communication. ISBN 0190255234.
- Graff, Gary (2024). 501 Essential Albums of the '90s: The Music Fan's Definitive Guide. ISBN 9780760389041.
- Gravely, Garrett (September 14, 2020). "The 8 Greatest Posthumous Albums of All Time". Dallas Observer. ProQuest 2442444698.
- Griffin, Andrew (October 14, 2003). "'Selena Greatest Hits' Testament To Departed Diva's Talent". The Town Talk – via Newspapers.com.
- Gordon, Elizabeth (August 23, 1995). "CD Reviews". Evening Chronicle – via Newspapers.com.
- Gross, Katherine (April 16, 2025). "Happy heavenly birthday to Selena, the record-breaking 'Queen of Tejano Music'". Guinness World Records.
- Guerra, Joey (April 2, 2010). "Selena's music lives on 15 years after her death". Edmonton Journal. ProQuest 251485179.
- Guerra, Joey (January 29, 2015). "2-Day Selena Festival In Corpus Christi Will Run April 17–18". The Houston Chronicle – via Newspapers.com.
- Guerra, Joey (January 31, 2015b). "Selena's Influence Still Strong 20 Years Later". The Houston Chronicle – via Newspapers.com.
- Guerra, Joey (March 31, 2020c). "Streaming of you: Selena is still 'la reina' on Spotify". Houstonchronicle.com.
- Guerra, Joey (March 27, 2020). "Ranking Selena's albums: 'Dulce Amor' to 'Dreaming of You'". Houston Chronicle.
- Guerra, Joey (March 27, 2005). "Her complete works - Collective recordings of Selena span a number of genres". Houston Chronicle – via Newsbank.
- Gundersen, Edna (April 8, 1995). "Selena Was Reaching For Crossover Appeal". The Californian – via Newspapers.com.
- Gundersen, Edna (July 28, 1995b). "No. 1 Start For Selena's 'Dreaming'". USA Today – via Newspapers.com.
- Harvilla, Rob (2024). 60 Songs That Explain The '90s. ISBN 978-1538759462.
- Harrington, Richard (April 20, 1995). "Life After Death". Fort Worth Star-Telegram – via Newspapers.com.
- Harrington, Richard (July 27, 1995b). "Selena's Last Work Is Fastest-Selling Female Pop Album". The Boston Globe – via Newspapers.com.
- Hess, John (1998). Jump Cut. ISBN 9781138691353.
- Hernandez, Barbara (March 28, 1997). "Selena: Film Gives Fans Glimpse Of Slain Star". Tri-City Herald – via Newspapers.com.
- Hernandez, Roger E. (August 3, 1995). "Selena's Hit Record Symbolizes Rising Silent Majority". Simi Valley Star – via Newspapers.com.
- Hetter, Katia (March 27, 2015). "Selena: 20 years after her death". CNN. ProQuest 1667733757.
- Hirst, Andrew (August 30, 1995). "Strike's Fanfare For The Charts". Huddersfield Daily Examiner – via Newspapers.com.
- Hobbs, Bill (March 28, 1994). "Industry singing praises of Tejano music". Amusement Business. ProQuest 209429958.
- Hochman, Steve (December 24, 1995). "Str8 To The List". Los Angeles Times – via Newspapers.com.
- Hoffman, Frank (2005). Encyclopedia of Recorded Sound. ISBN 0415971209.
- Hoover, Carl (July 19, 1995). "Selena: A Star Reborn". Waco Tribune-Herald – via Newspapers.com.
- Hoover, Carl (July 29, 1995b). "'Dreasming' A Legacy To Young Legend Cut Short". Waco Tribune-Herald – via Newspapers.com.
- Houghton, Cillea (March 31, 2023). "Meet the Writer Behind "I Could Fall in Love" by Selena". Americansongwriter.com.
- Hough, Amy (August 10, 1995). "Moe Berg And Co. Bounce Back". See (92).
- Holston, Mark; Flores, Robin (October 1995). "Reviews: Music". Hispanic. Vol. 8, no. 9. ProQuest 236981488.
- Hutchison, Kay Bailey (2004). American Heroines: The Spirited Women Who Shaped Our Country (2nd ed.). HarperCollins. ISBN 9780061875366.
- Infusino, Divina (September 22, 1995). "Selena Cero Una Diferencia En El Mundo De La Musica Latina". Fort Worth Star-Telegram (in Spanish) – via Newspapers.com.
- Inzunza, Francisco (March 30, 2021). "Chris Pérez relata uno de los momentos más desgarradores tras la muerte de Selena". El Debate (in Spanish). ProQuest 2507660774.
- Jacklewicz, Greg (July 19, 1995b). "Dreaming Of Selena". Abilene Reporter-News – via Newspapers.com.
- Jackson, Alan (August 18, 1995b). "She's No. 1 - with a bullet; Selena Quintanilla". The Times. ProQuest 318316412.
- Jackson, Chris (April 3, 1995). "Fans Throughout The County Join Throngs Grieving Singer". Simi Valley Star – via Newspapers.com.
- Jaeger, Barbara (June 9, 1995). "Album Notes". The Record – via Newspapers.com.
- Jaeger, Barbara (August 4, 1995b). "Ex-Pogue Revives A Dismal Career". The Record – via Newspapers.com.
- Jerez, Felix (August 2, 1995). "Disco De Selena Arrasa En NJ". The Jersey Journal (in Spanish) – via Newspapers.com.
- Jones, Anderson (July 21, 1995). "Selena: More Than A Madonna Clone". Philadelphia Daily News – via Newspapers.com.
- Jones, Preston (July 18, 2025). "Selena's Influential, Pathbreaking Posthumous Album Dreaming of You Turns 30 This Year". Dallasobserver.com.
- Jordan, Chris (March 24, 2005). "CDs, DVDs, Concerts Remember Selena". The Ithaca Journal – via Newspapers.com.
- Jordan, Chris (March 25, 2005b). "El Final De La Inocencia". The Central New Jersey Home News (in Spanish) – via Newspapers.com.
- Joseph, Harriet Denise (2018). From Santa Anna to Selena: Notable Mexicanos and Tejanos in Texas History since 1821. University of North Texas Press. ISBN 978-1574417234.
- Kanellos, Nicolas (1997). Hispanic firsts : 500 years of extraordinary achievement. ISBN 9780787605179.
- Khalid, Asma (October 24, 2021). "In 'Dreaming of You,' poet Melissa Lozada-Oliva reimagines Selena's legacy". NPR. ProQuest 2585082013.
- King, Ben Tavera (March 2, 1991). "Tejano Music Awards Brownsville's Mazz makes clean sweep - Selena, Emilio Navairra garner honors". San Antonio Express-News – via Newsbank.
- King, Ben Tavera (March 31, 1991b). "Future shock, Tejano style". San Antonio Express-News – via Newsbank.
- King, Ben Tavera (August 30, 1992). "Corrido still makes news in these parts". San Antonio Express-News – via Newsbank.
- Lapham, Bob (July 22, 1988). "Selena Headlines Show". Abilene Reporter-News – via Newspapers.com.
- Lannert, John (August 22, 1992). "Latin Notas" (PDF). Billboard. Vol. 104, no. 34.
- Lannert, John (October 10, 1992b). "SBK's Dual-Lingo Promo Translates Into Success" (PDF). Billboard. Vol. 104, no. 41.
- Lannert, John (June 18, 1994). "Selena Grabs Top Spot On Latin 50". Billboard. Vol. 106, no. 25.
- Lannert, John (June 10, 1995b). "Beloved Selena Enters The Latin Music Hall Of Fame". Billboard. Vol. 107, no. 23 – via Newspapers.com.
- Lannert, John (July 22, 1995c). "Latin Notas". Billboard. Vol. 107, no. 29.
- Lannert, John (July 29, 1995d). "June Sales Let Down For Music Stores". Billboard. Vol. 107, no. 30.
- Lannert, John; Bronson, Fred; Verna, Paul (August 5, 1995). "Selena's 'Dreaming Of You' Set Is Bittersweet Hit For Late EMI Star". Billboard. Vol. 107, no. 31.
- Lannert, John (September 2, 1995e). "The Selena Phenomenon". Billboard. Vol. 107, no. 35.
- Lannert, John (September 16, 1995f). "Hot 100 > September 16, 1995". Billboard. Vol. 107, no. 36.
- Lannert, John (September 30, 1995k). "Latin Notas". Billboard. Vol. 107, no. 39.
- Lannert, John (December 23, 1995i). "Latin '95 Marked By One Name: Selena". Billboard. Vol. 107, no. 51.
- Lannert, Jon (April 6, 1996b). "Emilio, Selena Ignite Tejano Awards". Billboard. Vol. 108, no. 14.
- Lannert, Jon (February 10, 1996d). "Latin Notas". Billboard. Vol. 108, no. 6.
- Lannert, John (March 9, 1997). "Hope Runs High For 'Selena' Soundtrack". Florida Today – via Newspapers.com.
- Lannert, John (March 15, 1997e). "Indies No. 1 In Latin Record Business In U.S." Billboard. Vol. 109, no. 11.
- Lannert, John (April 5, 1997d). "Finishing Touches To Latin Confab". Billboard. Vol. 109, no. 14.
- Lannert, John (April 12, 1997c). "Latin Notas". Billboard. Vol. 109, no. 15.
- Lannert, John (September 13, 1997b). "Great Expectations As Midem Latin Debuts". Billboard. Vol. 109, no. 40.
- Lannert, John (January 10, 1998). "Latin Notas". Billboard. Vol. 110, no. 2.
- Lannert, John (January 17, 1998b). "Retail Track". Billboard. Vol. 110, no. 3.
- Lannert, John (April 25, 1998d). "Latin Notas". Billboard. Vol. 110, no. 17.
- Lannert, John (August 15, 1998c). "Midyear Sales Show Strong Market". Billboard. Vol. 110, no. 33.
- Lannert, John (January 9, 1999). "Selena Still Lives". Billboard. Vol. 111, no. 1.
- Lannert, John (December 25, 1999b). "1999: The Year In Music". Billboard. Vol. 111, no. 52.
- Larkin, Colin (2000). The Virgin Encyclopedia of Nineties Music. ISBN 0753504278.
- Larsen, Dave (August 4, 1995). "Recordings On Review". Dayton Daily News – via Newspapers.com.
- Latu, Kalino (March 29, 2025). "30 years after Selena's death: How 'Dreaming of You' became her legacy—and why the Jets' veitapui rejection honours Tonga". kanivatonga.co.nz.
- Legon, Jeordan (September 1, 1995). "Death-Defying". The Buffalo News – via Newspapers.com.
- Lemieux, Josh (May 14, 1995). "Selena's Kin See Worst And Best Of Human Nature". The Monitor – via Newspapers.com.
- Lepage, Mark (September 2, 1995). "Stones Ore". The Gazette – via Newspapers.com.
- Levin, Eric (1997). The most intriguing people of the century. ISBN 9781883013141.
- Laue, Christine; Lister, Karen (July 18, 1995). "Strong Memories Shade Debut". Corpus Christi Caller-Times – via Newspapers.com.
- Lister, Karen (July 13, 1995). "Selena's Album Pirated". Corpus Christi Caller-Times – via Newspapers.com.
- Lister, Karen (July 16, 1995c). "Excitement Builds For Singer's New CD". Corpus Christi Caller-Times – via Newspapers.com.
- Lister, Karen (July 18, 1995d). "Celebrations Mark Debut Of Selena's Last Recording". Corpus Christi Caller-Times – via Newspapers.com.
- Liner, Elaine; Stein, Steve (April 4, 1995). "For Her Business And Music, An Uncertain Future". Corpus Christi Caller-Times – via Newspapers.com.
- Lopetegui, Enrique (April 8, 1995). "A Crossover Dream Halted Prematurely, Tragically". Los Angeles Times – via Newspapers.com.
- Lopetegui, Enrique (March 31, 2015). "Selena's Dad: Mixed Feelings About Fans Marking Star's Death". The Brownsville Herald – via Newspapers.com.
- Longo, Annamaria (February 27, 2005). "10 Years Don't Fade Selena's Life, Music". El Paso Times – via Newspapers.com.
- Lopez, Julyssa (November 28, 2019). "Viva Selena! How a murdered pop star gives hope to Latinos". The Guardian. ProQuest 2319376950.
- Lopez Medina, Suzanne (July 29, 1995). "Selena CD Selling Out Locally". The Arizona Republic – via Newspapers.com.
- Lustig, Jay (July 23, 1995). "Selena Goes Commercial On Last Album". The Star-Ledger – via Newspapers.com.
- Manheim, James M. (2003). Contemporary hispanic biography Volume 2. ISBN 0787665398.
- Marshall, Nick (September 22, 1995). "Eternal Voice". Hull Daily Mail – via Newspapers.com.
- Martin, Deborah (July 13, 1995). "Selena: Singer's Career Comes Full Circle With Release Of 'Dreaming Of You'". El Paso Herald-Post – via Newspapers.com.
- Martin, Dale (July 16, 1995b). "Selena Album Goes Mainstream". Victoria Advocate – via Newspapers.com.
- Martinez, Laura B. (July 30, 2022). "First Selena Song Released From Long-Awaited Album". Valley Morning Star – via Newspapers.com.
- Martinez, Gerald (October 8, 1995). "Fresh style of Christine Anu". New Straits Times. ProQuest 269054365.
- Mata, Reyes (June 24, 1995). "Selena's English Song Hot Request In Angelo". San Angelo Standard-Times – via Newspapers.com.
- Maldonado, Vilma (April 24, 1991). "Selena". The Monitor – via Newspapers.com.
- Maldonado, Vilma (February 18, 1994). "Valley Mariachi/Folklorico Groups Performed In France". The Monitor – via Newspapers.com.
- Maldonado, Vilma (July 22, 1994b). "Artists Busy Touring, Releasing New Tejano Music". The Monitor – via Newspapers.com.
- Maldonado, Vilma (April 1, 1995). "Young Entertainer's Death Stuns Tejano Music World". The Monitor – via Newspapers.com.
- Maldonado, Vilma (April 3, 1995b). "Selena Fans Show Their Love". The Monitor – via Newspapers.com.
- Maldonado, Vilma (July 18, 1995c). "Music Stores Brace For Selena CD Crush". The Monitor – via Newspapers.com.
- Maldonado, Vilma (July 19, 1995d). "Selena Fans Rush To Buy New Release". The Monitor – via Newspapers.com.
- Maldonado, Vilma (July 22, 1995e). "Selena Release A Smash Hit". The Monitor – via Newspapers.com.
- Marini, Richard A. (July 8, 2022). "Tejano star Shelly Lares is retiring — sort of". San Antonio Express-News.
- Marquez, RJ; Gomez, Valerie (October 17, 2019). "From David Lee, Emilio, Selena to decline: We examine rise, fall, future of Tejano music". KSAT.
- Max, Arthur (July 1995). ""Quiero Morirme" Una Frase Premonitoria". Enterese. Vol. 4, no. 7.
- Mayfield, Geoff (June 7, 2003). "Over The Counter". Billboard. Vol. 115, no. 23.
- McLeese, Don (May 5, 1994). "Arista Sets Sights On Tejano". Austin American-Statesman – via Newspapers.com.
- McLeese, Don; Lindell, Chuck; Gamboa, Suzanne (April 1, 1995). "Fans Mourn After Popular Performer Is Shot At Corpus Christi Motel". Austin American-Statesman – via Newspapers.com.
- Mcleese, Don (July 13, 1995). "Selena Crosses Over". Austin American-Statesman – via Newspapers.com.
- McIntyre, Hugh (May 8, 2025). "Selena Scores Another Posthumous Chart Win". Forbes.com.
- McKenna, Jerr (October 28, 1995). "Hot 100 Singles Spotlight". Billboard. Vol. 107, no. 43.
- Medina, John Henry (April 23, 2025b). "Selena Honored with RIAA Lifetime Achievement Award at St. Jude's, 'Dreaming of You' Reaches 62x Platino". Tejanonation.net.
- Medina, John Henry (June 5, 2025). "Selena's 'Dreaming of You' Celebrates 30 Years with Remastered Vinyl Release". Tejanonation.net.
- Mejias Rentas, Antonio (April 13, 1995). "Selena, numero uno: discos de la cantante han vuelto a colocarse en los primeros". La Opinión (in Spanish). ProQuest 368193452.
- Menconi, David (February 13, 2004). "When Musicians Cross Over". The News and Observer – via Newspapers.com.
- Miley, Scott L. (July 21, 1995). "Selena's New Disc Features Little That Makes It Memorable". The Indianapolis Star – via Newspapers.com.
- Millner, Denene (April 4, 1999). "Full Force Comes Full Circle". Daily News – via Newspapers.com.
- Minnick, Doug (September 24, 2010). "José Behar, President EMI Latin". Taxi A&R. Archived from the original on January 30, 2015.
- Mitchell, Rick (August 2, 1994b). "Sunday crowd belonged to Selena". Houston Chronicle – via Newsbank.
- Mitchell, Rick (April 12, 1995b). "Record Company Planning Selena Retrospective". Fort Worth Star-Telegram – via Newspapers.com.
- Mitchell, Rick (April 2, 1995). "Selena Dazzled Audiences As 'Superstar On The Rise'". The Plain Dealer – via Newspapers.com.
- Mitchell, Rick (May 21, 1995f). "Selena: In Life, She Was The Queen Of Tejano Music. In Death, The 23-Year-Old Singer Is Fast Becoming A Legend". The Houston Chronicle – via Newspapers.com.
- Mitchell, Rick (July 16, 1995e). "Her Promise Now A Farewell". The Houston Chronicle – via Newspapers.com.
- Mitchell, Rick (December 24, 1995c). "Best Singles of 1995". Houston Chronicle – via Newspapers.com.
- Mitchell, Rick (December 31, 1995d). "1995: The Year In Review". Houston Chronicle – via Newspapers.com.
- Mitchell, Rick (April 7, 1996). "Essential recordings of Gulf Coast music". Business World. ProQuest 296122508.
- Mitchell, Rich (July 29, 1994). "Tejano's pop diva/Selena finds new audiences as her popularity grows". Houston Chronicle. ProQuest 296004726.
- Mitchell, Gail (January 9, 2010). "King-Sized". Billboard. Vol. 122, no. 1.
- Monk, Katherine (August 17, 1995). "Selena's Dreams Underscore Tragedy". The Vancouver Sun – via Newspapers.com.
- Monk, Katherine (September 7, 1995b). "Tuned In". The Windsor Star – via Newspapers.com.
- Moon, Tom (July 23, 1995). "Selena's Farewell; Ernie Dale's Pure Singing". The Philadelphia Inquirer – via Newspapers.com.
- Moon, Troy (March 21, 1997). "Be Accurate When You Say 'Genius'". Pensacola News Journal – via Newspapers.com.
- Morales, Ed (2002). Living in Spanglish : the search for Latino identity in America. ISBN 9780312262327.
- Morales, Ed (September 1995). "Selena: Dreaming Of You". Vibe. Vol. 2, no. 7.
- Morales, Maria (March 5, 2005). "10 Anos De Lagrimas Y Recuerdos". El Nuevo Herald (in Spanish) – via Newspapers.com.
- Morthland, John (March 1994). "Switchhitter". Texas Monthly. Vol. 22, no. 3. ProQuest 226961096.
- Mossman, Jennifer (1999). Reference library of American women. ISBN 078763865X.
- Moss, Adam (August 22, 1995). "Tribute To Dead Selena". Manchester Evening News – via Newspapers.com.
- Moulder, Marsha (July 19, 1995). "Late Tejano Star's Album Sales Are Brisk". Victoria Advocate – via Newspapers.com.
- McGovern, Adam (2000). MusicHound World: The Essential Album Guide. ISBN 1578590396.
- Moses, Robert; Potter, Alicia; Rowen, Beth (1997). The 1997 A & E entertainment almanac : an information please almanac. ISBN 0395828554.
- Navarro, Juan Manuel (July 25, 1995). "Ya tienen dueno 500 mil 'suenos'". El Norte (in Spanish). ProQuest 316390334.
- Nilles, Billy (July 18, 2020). "Still Dreaming of You: An Oral History of Selena Quintanilla's Final Album 25 Years Later". E! News.
- Obejas, Achy (August 3, 1995). "Might Have Been". Chicago Tribune – via Newspapers.com.
- Oliva, John (March 17, 2021). "Texas Monthly Honors Selena With April Issue". Corpus Christi Caller-Times – via Newspapers.com.
- Oliva, John (May 12, 2021b). "Meet The Real People Behind Netflix's 'Selena: The Series'". Corpus Christi Caller-Times – via Newspapers.com.
- Oliva, John (August 28, 2022c). "11 Selena Deep Cuts You Should Be Listening To". Corpus Christi Caller-Times – via Newspapers.com.
- Oliva, John (March 6, 2023). "Here Are 15 Female Singers From Lone Star State". Corpus Christi Caller-Times – via Newspapers.com.
- Olivas, Rogelio; Barrett, Elsa (March 24, 2005). "Our Favorite Selena Songs". Tucson Citizen – via Newspapers.com.
- Ortiz, Fernando (August 17, 1995). "Valley Trax". The Arizona Republic – via Newspapers.com.
- Parédez, Deborah (2009). Selenidad: Selena, Latinos, and the Performance of Memory. Duke University Press. ISBN 9780822390893.
- Patoski, Joe Nick (1996). Selena: Como La Flor. Little Brown and Company. ISBN 0-316-69378-2.
- Patoski, Joe Nick (2006). Texas Monthly On... Texas Women. University of Texas Press. ISBN 9780292713277.
- Paul, Maria Luisa (May 17, 2022). "Selena's Father Announces New Album 27 Years After Singer's Death". The Star-Ledger – via Newspapers.com.
- Peña, Manuel (2002). Música Tejana. Texas A&M University. ISBN 978-0-89096-888-8.
- Peralta, Eyder (March 27, 2005). "The unintentional feminist - Whether or not Selena changed Tejano's status quo, she changed the genre". Houston Chronicle – via Newsbank.
- Peralta, Eyder (April 7, 2005b). "Latin music moves forward". Houston Chronicle – via Newsbank.
- Pérez, Chris (2012). To Selena, with Love. Penguin Books. ISBN 978-1-101-58026-4.
- Perez, Juan Carlos (July 12, 1995). "Un Sueno Postumo". El Nuevo Herald (in Spanish) – via Newspapers.com.
- Perez, Juan Carlos (July 18, 1995b). "El Sueno Postumo de Selena". El Nuevo Herald (in Spanish) – via Newspapers.com.
- Perez-Duthie, Juan Carlos (March 9, 2010). "Viva Selena". South Florida Sun - Sentinel. ProQuest 387556252.
- Perez, Sara Eva (April 4, 2015). "La "Madonna Mexicana" Sigue Inspirando". The Orlando Sentinel (in Spanish) – via Newspapers.com.
- Perry, Claudia (April 1, 1995). "Lake Jackson Native Formed Band At Age 9". The Houston Post – via Newspapers.com.
- Perry, Claudia (July 20, 1995b). "Selena May Get Her Big Dream". News-Press – via Newspapers.com.
- Pignato, Natalie; High, Umatilla (August 18, 1995). "Sound On Sound". The Orlando Sentinel – via Newspapers.com.
- Pollock, Bruce (2005). The rock song index : the 7500 most important songs of the Rock and Roll era, 1944-2000. ISBN 0415970733.
- Pressley, Sue Anne (April 2, 1995). "'Evil Assistant' Shoots Grammy-Winning Singer Through The Heart". The Ottawa Citizen – via Newspapers.com.
- Prodis, Julia; Jaklewicz, Greg (April 9, 1995). "Selena: Talented. Beautiful. Too Young To Die". Abilene Reporter-News – via Newspapers.com.
- Pugliese, Rob (July 20, 1995). "Dave Grohl Sizzles On 'Foo Fighters'". The Patriot-News – via Newspapers.com.
- Quintanilla, Selena (1989). Selena (Media notes). A.B. Quintanilla (producer), Suzette Quintanilla (spoken liner notes producer). EMI Latin. 724354099403.
- Quintanilla, Selena (1995). Dreaming of You (Media notes). A.B. Quintanilla (producer), Suzette Quintanilla (spoken liner notes producer). EMI Latin/EMI Records. 724354096907.
- Edward James Olmos (narrator), Jose Behar (executive producer), Abraham Quintanilla (executive producer), Claribel Cuevas (associate producer), Randal J. Edwards (associate producer), Ila von Hasperg (editor), Jeffrey Coulter (producer), Cecelia Miniucchi (director) (April 1, 1997). Selena Remembered (Documentary). EMI Latin Productions, Q-Productions.
- Michael Crawford (executive producer), Karen Blum (associate producer), Christina Hacopian (producer), Aris Piliguian (associate producer), Todd Hooker (editor), James Fielden (sound engineer), Julie Singleton (editor) (2005). Queen of Tejano Music (Documentary). Q-Productions.
- Gregory Hall (executive producer), Barbra Hall (producer, director), Mandi Roberts (production associate), Martin Melhuish and Robers (scriptwriters), Eddie Hales (editor), and Todd Pewitt (associate editor) (November 29, 2008). Biography (Documentary). A&E.
- Quintanilla, Abraham (2021). A Father's Dream. Q-Productions. ISBN 9781735041551.
- Rapoport, Emily Beth (December 15, 1999). "Latin Revolution". The Plain Dealer – via Newspapers.com.
- Renzetti, Elizabeth (October 9, 1995). "Chronicler of the weird has finger on the button". The Globe and Mail. ProQuest 384922692.
- Resendez, Hector (June 17, 1995c). "The Latin Lowdown" (PDF). Cashbox. 58 (40).
- Resendez, Hector (July 22, 1995). "The Latin Lowdown" (PDF). Cashbox. 58 (45).
- Resendez, Hector (September 2, 1995b). "Latin Music Reviews" (PDF). Cashbox. 59 (1).
- Richmond, Clint (1995). Selena: The Phenomenal Life and Tragic Death of the Tejano Music Queen. Pocket Books. ISBN 9780671545222.
- Richbourg, Diane (December 4, 1994). "Tejano Star Is Taking Music World By Storm While Keeping Her Feet Planted Firmly At Home". Corpus Christi Caller-Times – via Newspapers.com.
- Righi, Len (July 29, 1995). "Selena: Dreaming Of You". The Morning Call – via Newspapers.com.
- Rivas, Josue R. (July 18, 1995). "Latino Stores Beat 'Em To The Punch". Daily News – via Newspapers.com.
- Rivera-Ortiz, Manuel (August 4, 1995). "Variety Is Selena's Spice". Democrat and Chronicle – via Newspapers.com.
- Robbins, Ira (July 16, 1995). "Selena's Ironic Farewell". Newsday – via Newspapers.com.
- Robb, Jacqueline (2000). Go, girl! : young women superstars of pop music. ISBN 1888105453.
- Rodriguez Jr., Vincent (April 9, 1989). "Mature Selena Sees Success". Corpus Christi Caller-Times – via Newspapers.com.
- Rodriguez, Alvaro (March 31, 1996). "Tejano Soared With Selena's Death". The Monitor – via Newspapers.com.
- Rodriguez, Carlos (July 30, 1995). "Otra Selena". El Norte (in Spanish). ProQuest 316374618.
- Roiz, Jessica Lucia (December 9, 2015). "Selena Quintanilla New Song: Listen To 'Are You Ready To Be Loved' Meant For Crossover Album". Los Angeles Times.
- Roiz, Jessica; Flores, Girselda; Reynolds, J. (July 17, 2020). "Selena's 'Dreaming of You' Turns 25: Looking Back at the Best Songs (Editor's Picks)". Billboard.
- Roiz, Jessica (March 31, 2023). "'Amor Prohibido,' 'Dreaming of You' & More: What's the Best Selena Album? Vote!". Billboard.
- Roiz, Jessica (September 15, 2023b). "Longest-Leading No. 1s on the Top Latin Albums Chart: Selena, Bad Bunny & More". Billboard.
- Rohter, Larry (September 19, 1993). "Pop Music; Latin Music Crosses New Borders". The New York Times. ProQuest 429252505.
- Rohter, Larry (March 9, 1997). "Selena Lives". Santa Cruz Sentinel – via Newspapers.com.
- Roland, Tom (January 3, 1996). "Shania May Be A-Shinin' At Grammys". The Tennessean – via Newspapers.com.
- Rosas, Hector (July 15, 1995). "Sueno de Selena les da insomnio". El Norte (in Spanish). ProQuest 316379173.
- Rosas, Hector (July 19, 1995b). "Sus 'suenos' vuelan". El Norte (in Spanish). ProQuest 316376976.
- Sagen, Emily (October 2, 2020). "The Beat Lives On: Reflecting on Selena's 'Dreaming of You' 25 years later". University Wire. ProQuest 2447804273.
- Saldana, Hector (March 31, 2005). "Legend of Selena just keeps growing - 'What might have been' mystique draws old fans and new". San Antonio Express-News – via Newsbank.
- Scott Brown, Shibuya (August 21, 1994). "Think Tex-Mex With Attitude". Los Angeles Times. ProQuest 282311802.
- Schwieger, Kerry; Saffian, Sarah (July 21, 1995). "Nuevo CD De La Fallecida Estrella". Daily News – via Newspapers.com.
- Shaffer, Claire (July 17, 2020). "David Byrne Talks Collaborating With Selena on Song for Johnny Depp Film". Rollingstone.com.
- Sharpe, Colt (August 25, 1995). "CD Releases". The Guardian – via Newspapers.com.
- Simels, Steve (November 1995). "Popular music -- Dreaming of You by Selena". Stereo Review. Vol. 60, no. 11. ProQuest 211321379.
- Sisario, Ben (December 7, 2020). "Bad Bunny's New Album Is Billboard's First All-Spanish No. 1: The Charts". The New York Times. ProQuest 2467631267.
- Smith, Rick (July 18, 1995b). "A Dream Come True". San Angelo Standard-Times – via Newspapers.com.
- Smith, Troy (May 17, 2020). "Who Are The World's Greatest Singers?". The Plain Dealer – via Newspapers.com.
- Smithouser, Bob (1998). Chart Watch. ISBN 9781561796281.
- Snow, Shauna (December 25, 1999). "Morning Report". Los Angeles Times – via Newspapers.com.
- Snow, Tom (December 13, 2010). "Dreaming of You > Tom Snow Music". Tom Snow Music.com. Archived from the original on January 22, 2021.
- Spear, Elizabeth (August 4, 1995). "Selena's Stylish Album Hits Charts At No. 1". News-Pilot – via Newspapers.com.
- Stacy, Lee (2002). Mexico and the United States. Marshall Cavendish. ISBN 0-7614-7402-1.
- Stanley, Kendall P. (August 3, 1995). "Billboard's Record World Top 10". Petoskey News-Review – via Newspapers.com.
- Steinberg, David (July 9, 1995). "Workshops Teach Mariachi Style, Soul". Albuquerque Journal – via Newspapers.com.
- Stephens, Autumn (1998). Hell's belles and wild women. ISBN 9780965068499.
- Shawn Stockman (July 2, 2025). "Keeping Selena Alive, Suzette Quintanilla Opens Up On Selena's Tragic Passing, Legacy, & Upbringing". YouTube (Podcast).
- Stone, Rachel (November 15, 2005). "Selena beat her time with dance music". Beaumont Enterprise. ProQuest 373336829.
- Strauss, Neil (July 27, 1995). "Slain Singer Selena's Album 'Dreaming of You' Sets Sales Records". The Ann Arbor News – via Newspapers.com.
- Strauss, Neil (July 25, 1995b). "The Pop Life". The New York Times. ProQuest 430221006.
- Sullivan, Melissa (July 28, 1995). "Selena's Album A Nice Mix of English, Spanish Languages". Times Record News – via Newspapers.com.
- Sylvester, Ron (August 13, 1995). "Selena's Album Both Jon, Sorrow; Midler Too Mellow". The Springfield News-Leader – via Newspapers.com.
- Talbot, Mary (July 25, 1995). "'Dreaming' Of What Might've Been". Daily News – via Newspapers.com.
- Tardiff, Joseph C; Mabunda, L. Mpho (1996). Dictionary of Hispanic biography. ISBN 9780810383029.
- Tarradell, Mario (July 16, 1995). "Selena Lives On New CD". The Central New Jersey Home News – via Newspapers.com.
- Tarradell, Mario (December 31, 1995b). "Selena's Murder Skewed The Tejano Music Scene For 1995". The Monitor – via Newspapers.com.
- Tarradell, Mario (October 13, 1995c). "Selena's Husband Talks About Singer". Corpus Christi Caller-Times – via Newspapers.com.
- Tarradell, Mario (March 21, 1997b). "Soundtrack Album Part Of Crossover". News-Press – via Newspapers.com.
- Thanki, Juli (October 1, 2016). "Selena, Producer Made Magic". Corpus Christi Caller-Times – via Newspapers.com.
- Thomas, Rebecca (July 19, 1995). "Buyers Flock To Selena Album". The Orlando Sentinel – via Newspapers.com.
- Torres, Richard (May 2, 1999). "The Best Of Selena Lives On". Newsday – via Newspapers.com.
- Torres, Richard (March 19, 2000). "An Installment Of Selena's Legacy". Newsday – via Newspapers.com.
- Tracy, Kathleen (1999). Ricky Martin : red-hot and on the rise!. ISBN 9780821764305.
- Trevino, Joseph (July 18, 1995). "'Dreaming of you' no es precisamente el disco que Selena habria producido". La Opinión (in Spanish). ProQuest 368170736.
- Turner, Tom (July 28, 1995). "Tucson Goes Wild For Selena Album". Arizona Daily Star – via Newspapers.com.
- Tyle, Laura B. (2003). UXL Encyclopedia of World Biography, Vol. 9 – via Gale Research.
- Tyle, Laura B. (2023). UXL Encyclopedia of World Biography: J-L. Volume 6. ISBN 978-0787664657.
- Underhill, Terry (August 18, 1995). "Records And Albums". Houston Chronicle – via Newspapers.com.
- Untiedt, Kenneth L. (2013). Cowboys, Cops, Killers, and Ghosts: Legends and Lore in Texas. University of North Texas Press. ISBN 978-1-57441-532-2.
- Unterberger, Richie (1999). Music USA : the rough guide. ISBN 9781858284217.
- Valdes, Alisa (August 4, 1995). "Selena's Last CD Has Danceable Power". The Boston Globe – via Newspapers.com.
- Vargas, Doraluz (April 1, 1996). "Especial de Selena". TVyNovelas. 18 (7).
- Vargas, Deborah R. (2012). Dissonant Divas in Chicana Music The Limits of la Onda. University of Minnesota Press. ISBN 9780816673162.
- Vargas, Alani (April 25, 2019). "100 of the best songs from the '90s". Insider. ProQuest 2424085110.
- Villa, Lucas (March 23, 2020). "10 Selena Deep Cuts to Keep You Entertained During Social Distancing". Remezcla.com.
- Wakeford, Dan; Adato, Allison; Correa, Armando Lucas (2020). Selena: Celebrating Her Life & Legacy 25 Years Later. Meredith Special Interest.
- Walker, Deborah (July 18, 1995). "Debbie Gibson Out Of Step; Selena's Stardom Glimpsed". South Florida Sun Sentinel – via Newspapers.com.
- Ward, Pamela (July 19, 1995b). "Selena Fans Make New CD A Commodity Muy Caliente". Austin American-Statesman – via Newspapers.com.
- Watrous, Peter; Burr, Ramiro (April 4, 1995). "A Foiled Border Crossing". The Oregonian – via Newspapers.com.
- Watrous, Peter (July 31, 1995). "'Dreaming' Offers Glimpse Of What Might Have Been". Oakland Tribune – via Newspapers.com.
- Westbrook, Bruce (August 1, 1996). "Actress Already 'Attached' To Her Lead Role In Selena". The Miami Herald – via Newspapers.com.
- Wheeler, Jill C. (1996). Selena: The Queen of Tejano. Abdo & Daughters. ISBN 1562395238.
- Wild, David (August 4, 1995). "Sugar Puts The Punch In Power Pop". News and Record – via Newspapers.com.
- Wilker, Deborah (August 4, 1995b). "Gibson Tries To Get Back On Right Track". Fort Lauderdale Sun-Sentinel – via Newspapers.com.
- Young, Mark C. (1998). The Guinness book of records 1999. ISBN 9780553580754.
- Zaragoza, Alex (March 31, 2025). "Still Dreaming Big, With Love". Los Angeles Times – via Newspapers.com.
