= El Toro Relajo =

Single by Selena

from the album Dreaming of You
- Released: December 24, 1995
- Recorded: 1994
- Studio: Cherokee Studios (Hollywood, California); Q-Productions (Corpus Christi, TX)
- Genre: Latin
- Length: 2:19
- Label: EMI
- Songwriter: Felipe Bermejo
- Producer: José Hernàndez

Selena singles chronology
"Techno Cumbia" (1995)	"El Toro Relajo" (1995)	"I'm Getting Used to You" (1996)

"El Toro Relajo" (Eng.: The Partying Bull) is a popular mariachi song written by Felipe Bermejo and has been recorded by several artists. Selena recorded the song in 1994 for the soundtrack of the 1995 film Don Juan DeMarco.

== Critical reception ==
Enrique Lopetegui of the Los Angeles Times wrote: "But it's the two new Spanish ranchera songs [El Toro Relajo and Tú Sólo Tú], backed by El Monte's Mariachi Sol de Mexico, that are most impressive, as Selena effortlessly adapted to a difficult style she wasn't very familiar with, However Selena was sick during the recording, so her voice wasn't in good shape."

== Linda Ronstadt version ==
Linda Ronstadt included this track on her album Mas Canciones in 1991.

== Selena version ==
The song was included on the album Dreaming of You, recorded by Selena, and was released as the fifth single from that album (the second in Spanish). The single could not match the success of the previous singles in the Billboard Hot Latin Tracks, peaking only at number 24.

Chart Performance

Chart (1995)	Peak position
US Hot Latin Songs (Billboard)	24
US Regional Mexican Songs (Billboard)	14
Mexico Ranchero (El Siglo de Torreón)	9

== Personnel ==
- Arranged and produced by: José Hernàndez
- Vocals: Selena
- Chorus and special guests: Mariachi Sol de México
- Engineered by: Bruce Robb
- Mixed by: Robb Bross, Productions
- Recorded at: Cherokee Studio, CA
- Selena's vocals recorded at: Q-Zone Studios, Corpus Christi, TX.
