= I'm Getting Used to You =

Single by Selena

from the album Dreaming of You
- Released: March 5, 1996
- Studio: Oakshire Recorders (Los Angeles, CA)
- Length: 4:03
- Label: EMI
- Songwriter(s): Diane Warren
- Producer(s): Rhett Lawrence

Selena singles chronology
"El Toro Relajo" (1995)	"I'm Getting Used to You" (1996)	"Siempre Hace Frio" (1996)

"I'm Getting Used to You" is the title of the fourth single released by Selena from the album Dreaming of You. It was written by Diane Warren and produced by Rhett Lawrence. The song was released on March 5, 1996, by EMI, being serviced to pop and rhythmic radio stations.

== Song information ==
The track was written by songwriter Diane Warren in the key of F#minor with the BPM of 100 and Selena's range here was from F#3-F#5, and was chosen to be the fourth release (third in English language). The song was not as successful as the previous singles, but managed to peak at number 7 on the Billboard Bubbling Under Hot 100 singles chart.

== Track listing ==
US Maxi-CD

1. I'm Getting Used To You (Album Version) 4:03
2. I'm Getting Used To You (Def Radio Mix) 3:42
3. I'm Getting Used To You (Def Club Mix) 8:40
4. I'm Getting Used To You (Dub A Dub Mix) 6:48
5. I'm Getting Used To You (Beatstrumental Mix) 5:50

== Chart performance ==
Chart (1996)	Peak position
U.S. Billboard Bubbling Under Hot 100 Singles	7
U.S. Billboard Hot Adult Contemporary Tracks	23
U.S. Billboard Rhythmic Top 40	27

== Personnel ==
- Produced and arranged by: Rhett Lawrence
- Lead and background vocals by: Selena
- Mixed by: Nathaniel "Mick" Guzauski
- Engineer: Dan García
- Assistant engineer: Cal Harris Jr.
- Synthetizers, drums and programming: Rhett Lawrence
- Percussion: Luis Conte
- Horns: Jerry Hey, Dan Higgens, Gary Grant, Bill Reichenbac
- Production coordinator: Janie Smith
- Computer tech: Chris Kohler
- Recorded at: Oakshire Recorders, Los Angeles, CA
- Mixed at: Conway Studios, Hollywood, CA

== Release history ==
Region	Date	Format(s)	Label(s)	Ref(s).
United States	March 5, 1996	Contemporary hit radio; rhythmic contemporary radio	EMI	
United States	March 25, 1996	12-inch vinyl	EMI	
