= UWIRE =

American collegiate wire service

UWIRE is an American wire service for student journalists at more than 800 colleges and universities across the United States. It acts as a sort of hub between these institutions' newspapers, giving each of its over 850 members access to news, sports, features, entertainment and opinion articles by the other members. UWIRE also distributes its members' content to professional media outlets, including CBS News, CNN and Yahoo.

Membership is free to collegiate newspapers. UWIRE staff members cull articles from these papers and supply them the next day to the other members; thus, newspapers may publish peer institutions' articles to complement their material. UWIRE also supplies articles to professional news media and high school newspapers for a fee.

UWIRE features the first social networking platform dedicated to aspiring journalists—a free service. The site also displays the best stories from the agency's wire and its social network's best contributors.

On December 31, 2008 the college video reporting network Palestra.net purchased UWIRE from CBS.

In October 2009, UWIRE "suspended indefinitely" its text wire service. UWIRE resumed normal operation of its wire service on April 1, 2010.
