= Enamorada de Ti (disambiguation) =

Enamorada de Ti, is a 2012 album by Selena.

Enamorada de Ti may also refer to:

- "Enamorada de Ti" (song), a 1990 song by Selena
- "Enamorada de Ti", a 2007 song by Jenilca Giusti
