= La Leyenda =

Box set by Selena
- Released: March 9, 2010
- Recorded: 1986–1995
- Genres: Cumbia, Tejano, Latin pop, ranchera
- Length: 4:59:05
- Labels: Capitol Latin, EMI, Q-Productions
- Producers: A.B. Quintanilla, Jose Behar

Selena chronology
Through the Years / A Traves de los Años (2007)	La Leyenda (2010)	Enamorada de Ti (2012)

La Leyenda (English: The Legend) is the name of the third box set from the Tejano pop singer Selena that was released by Capitol Latin/EMI and Q-Productions labels. The album was released on March 9, 2010. This box set was released in three formats: a four-disc box set, a two-disc special-edition album, and a single-disc album.

== Background and production ==
In October 2009, EMI teamed up with Q-Productions for the box set and agreed on releasing the album in three different formats: one four disc box set, two special edition albums, and a single disc album. In mid-October 2009, Selena's sister released a public video about this project in which she reached out to the fans to contribute a special message for Selena, including a picture of themself, that may or may not be used for this album's release.

The box set was released on March 9, 2010 to memorialize the fifteenth anniversary of Selena's death on March 31, 1995.

== Release and promotion ==
In April 2009, Univision Network released a Selena special entirely in Spanish called Selena: La Historia de una Leyenda (Selena: The History of a Legend). This special was a preview of Johnny Canales presenta Selena, released in the fall of 2010 by Q-Productions.

In early February 2010, Selena's family created a YouTube channel titled SelenaLaLeyenda, where A.B. Quintanilla, DJ Kane, and Alejandra Guzmán posted personal messages for Selena.

== Reception ==
Professional ratings
Review scores
Source	Rating
Allmusic	4/5 stars

Allmusic writer Stephen Thomas Erlewine gave the album 4 out of 5 stars and stated "This set is designed to illustrate her range, and it does it well even if some hardcore fans may find some quibbles with the song selection".

== Track listings ==
Capitol Latin/EMI and Q-Productions have released a full line press release regarding the box set. La Leyenda gathers Selena's top hits and fan favorites for a career-spanning celebration of her vibrant music and life.

=== 4 Disc Deluxe Edition ===
The box set includes 82 tracks on four CDs, grouped by musical style, language and cover versions

Disc 1 (Cumbias & Pop)

1. "Amor Prohibido"
2. "Baila Esta Cumbia"
3. "La Carcacha"
4. "Besitos"
5. "Como La Flor"
6. "El Chico Del Apartamento 512"
7. "La Llamada"
8. "Bidi Bidi Bom Bom"
9. "Quiero Ser"
10. "Si Una Vez"
11. "No Debes Jugar"
12. "Techno Cumbia"
13. "Costumbres"
14. "Fotos Y Recuerdos"
15. "No Quiero Saber"
16. "Enamorada de Tí"
17. "Tú Robaste Mi Corazón" (duet with Emilio Navaira)
18. "Ya No"
19. "No Te Vayas"
20. "Amame"
21. "Aunque No Salga El Sol"
22. "Puede Ser" (duet with Nando "Guero" Domínguez)
23. "Sukiyaki"
24. "Buenos Amigos" (duet with Álvaro Torres)

Disc 2 (Tejano & Rancheras)

1. "Contigo Quiero Estar"
2. "Amame, Quiéreme"
3. "Ya Ves"
4. "Mentiras"
5. "La Tracalera"
6. "Cobarde"
7. "Si La Quieres"
8. "Tus Desprecios"
9. "Yo Te Sigo Queriendo"
10. "Ven Conmigo"
11. "Las Cadenas"
12. "Vuelve A Mi"
13. "Siempre Estoy Pensando En Ti"
14. "Yo Te Amo" (Live)
15. "Yo Me Voy"
16. "Despues De Enero"
17. "Dame Un Beso"
18. "Tengo Ganas De Llorar"
19. "Tu Eres"
20. "Tú Sólo Tú"
21. "El Toro Relajo"
22. "Siempre Hace Frio"
23. "¿Qué Creias?"
24. "No Me Queda Más"

Disc 3 (English rhythm and blues crossover music)

1. "I Could Fall in Love"
2. "My Love"
3. "Missing My Baby"
4. "Captive Heart"
5. "I'm Getting Used To You"
6. "God's Child (Baila Conmigo)" (duet with David Byrne)
7. "Dreaming of You"
8. "Wherever You Are (Donde Quiera Que Estés)" (duet with Barrio Boyzz)
9. "Only Love"
10. "A Million to One"
11. "Is It the Beat?"
12. "Where Did the Feeling Go?"
13. "A Boy Like That"
14. "Always Mine"
15. "I'm Getting Used To You" (Def Club Mix) [bonus track]
16. "Don't Throw Away My Love" [bonus track]

Disc 4 (Live)

1. "Disco Medley" (I Will Survive/Funkytown/Last Dance/The Hustle/On the Radio)
2. "Amame, Quiéreme/Siempre Estoy Pensando En Ti"
3. "Amor Prohibido"
4. "Baila Esta Cumbia"
5. "No Me Queda Más"
6. "El Chico Del Apartamento 512"
7. "Si La Quieres"
8. "Bidi Bidi Bom Bom"
9. "Si Una Vez"
10. "Ya Ves"
11. "¿Qué Creias?"
12. "Tus Desprecios"
13. "Cobarde"
14. "Techno Cumbia"
15. "La Carcacha"
16. "Ven Conmigo/Perdoname"
17. "Como La Flor"
18. "Como Te Extraño" (Pete Astudillo) [bonus track]

=== 2 Disc Special Edition ===
Disc 1

1. "Amor Prohibido"
2. "Besitos"
3. "Baila Esta Cumbia"
4. "La Carcacha"
5. "Como La Flor"
6. "No Debes Jugar"
7. "La Llamada"
8. "Bidi Bidi Bom Bom"
9. "Si Una Vez"
10. "El Chico Del Apartamento 512"
11. "Techno Cumbia"
12. "Costumbres"
13. "Fotos Y Recuerdos"
14. "Contigo Quiero Estar"
15. "Amame, Quiéreme"

Disc 2

1. "I Could Fall in Love"
2. "Only Love"
3. "Dreaming of You"
4. "I'm Getting Used To You"
5. "Where Did the Feeling Go?"
6. "Is It the Beat?"
7. "Buenos Amigos" (duet with Álvaro Torres)
8. "Aunque No Salga El Sol"
9. "No Quiero Saber"
10. "¿Qué Creias?"
11. "No Me Queda Más"
12. "Tú Sólo Tú"
13. "El Toro Relajo"
14. "Siempre Hace Frio"
15. "Como Te Extraño" (Pete Astudillo)

=== Single Disc Edition ===
1. "Bidi Bidi Bom Bom"
2. "La Llamada"
3. "Amor Prohibido"
4. "Como La Flor"
5. "No Me Queda Más"
6. "La Carcacha"
7. "Fotos Y Recuerdos"
8. "I Could Fall in Love"
9. "Tú Sólo Tú"
10. "Dreaming of You"
11. "Techno Cumbia"
12. "No Quiero Saber"
13. "El Chico Del Apartamento 512"
14. "Baila Esta Cumbia"
15. "Buenos Amigos" (duet with Álvaro Torres)

== Charts ==
Chart	Peak position
Canadian Albums Chart	81
Japanese Oricon Albums Chart	97
Mexican Albums Chart	29
Mexican Regional Albums Chart	4
US Billboard Top Latin Albums	7
US Billboard Regional Mexican Albums	4

== Certifications ==
Region	Certification	Certified units/sales
United States (RIAA)	Platinum (Latin)	60,000^{‡}
^{‡} Sales+streaming figures based on certification alone.

== Release dates ==
Release date	Country
March 9, 2010	USA
March 9, 2010	Canada
March 9, 2010	Mexico
March 16, 2010	South America
March 16, 2010	United Kingdom
March 23, 2010	Taiwan
May 3, 2010	Australia
May 10, 2010	Japan
June 25, 2010	Argentina
