= Performances (Selena video) =

- The cover for the Performances DVD.

Video by Selena
- Released: November 23, 2010
- Recorded: 1993–1994
- Genre: Tejano pop, R&B, Latin pop
- Length: 100 minutes
- Language: Spanish, English
- Label: EMI/EMI Latin

Selena DVD chronology
Through The Years DVD (2007)	Performances (2010)	Performances Live (2011)

Performances is a live DVD that features previously unreleased footages of Selena during The Johnny Canales Show, a live coverage music television show, from the periods of 1993 to 1994.

== Background ==
Selena Performances was originally named Johnny Canales Presenta... Selena (English: Johnny Canales Presents... Selena) and was going to be released during the fall of 2008. Due to new management for EMI Latin Records the DVD was postponed. The DVD was originally planned to be a DVD of various performances of Selena during The Johnny Canales Show from 1990 to 1994 but the record company compiled for a DVD that included both various live performances and a special that would talk about Selena's legacy currently. The promotional poster talks about an upcoming television film based on Selena's death, similar to the Famous Crime Scene: Selena that aired on VH1. The television film will be produced by The Walt Disney Company set to be released in 2011. The upcoming Selena United States Stamp Collection and the upcoming Selena museum tour is also talked about on the promotional poster.

== Track listing ==
The DVD comes in with two different styles, one being made of super jewel and another made of Amaray. The two contain the same track listings and features. The DVD movie features half of the movie of live performances while the other half includes a Selena special which is presented by Johnny Canales.

=== DVD chapters ===
1. "Intro"
2. "Como La Flor"
3. "Band Relationships"
4. "Las Cadenas"
5. "Loss of Selena"
6. "Missing My Baby"
7. "Selena Interview 1"
8. "¿Qué Creias?"
9. "Opening Doors"
10. "Bidi Bidi Bom Bom"
11. "Selena Interview 2"
12. "No Me Queda Mas"
13. "Favorite Song"
14. "Amor Prohibido"
15. "Memorable Show"
16. "Si Una Vez"
17. "Selena Interview 3"
18. "El Chico Del Apartamento 512"
19. "Why People Love Selena"

== Release history ==
Country	Date	Format	Label	Rating	Catalogue
United States	November 23, 2010	Amaray	EMI Records/EMI Latin	NR	B00475XUEW
United States	November 23, 2010	Super Jewel	EMI Records/EMI Latin	NR	B004763SMU
Canada	November 23, 2010	DVD compact	EMI Records/EMI Latin	NR	B004763SMU
Japan	November 23, 2010	DVD compact	EMI Music Japan	NR	B00005YWZN
