= Through the Years / A Traves de los Años =

Compilation album by Selena
- Released: April 3, 2007 (U.S.)
- Recorded: 1978–1995
- Genre: Tejano, Latin pop
- Length: 57:07
- Label: EMI Latin
- Producer: A.B. Quintanilla

Selena chronology
Dos Historias (2006)	Through the Years / A Traves de los Años (2007)	La Leyenda (2010)

Through the Years / A Traves de los Años is a compilation album by American singer Selena. It was released on April 3, 2007 by EMI Latin. It comes as a CD/DVD set that includes Selena's songs, unreleased performances, and also an unreleased track titled "Feelings" recorded when Selena was 7 years old in 1978. The album peaked at number 28 on the US Latin Album Chart and was certified Gold.

== Track listing ==
CD
No.	Title	Writer(s)	Length
1.	"Feelings" (previously unreleased) (recorded in 1978)	Morris Albert	2:35
2.	"Como Te Quiero Yo a Ti"	Ricky Vela	3:42
3.	"Tú Solamente Tú"	Camilo Sesto	2:37
4.	"Tú No Sabes"	Ricky Vela, Roger Garcia	3:19
5.	"Qué"	Johnny Herrera	3:38
6.	"Sukiyaki"	Rokusuke Ei, Hachidai Nakamura, Janice-Marie Johnson, Abraham Quintanilla Jr., Pete Astudillo	3:02
7.	"Ámame, Quiéreme"	A.B. Quintanilla III	2:53
8.	"Yo Te Amo"	A.B. Quintanilla III, Pete Astudillo	3:43
9.	"Ya Ves"	A.B. Quintanilla III, Pete Astudillo	3:17
10.	"Yo Te Sigo Queriendo"	A.B. Quintanilla III, Ricky Vela	3:10
11.	"Ámame"	Selena Quintanilla, Pete Astudillo	3:39
12.	"No Debes Jugar"	A.B. Quintanilla III, Ricky Vela	2:51
13.	"La Llamada"	A.B. Quintanilla III, Pete Astudillo	3:14
14.	"Fotos y Recuerdos"	Chrissie Hynde, Ricky Vela	2:36
15.	"Ya No"	A.B. Quintanilla III, Ricky Vela	3:55
16.	"Dreaming of You"	Franne Golde, Tom Snow	5:16
17.	"Puede Ser" (featuring Nando "Guero" Domínguez)	Ricky Vela, Chris Pérez	3:40
Total length:			57:07

DVD

Noche de Carnaval 1995
No.	Title	Writer(s)	Length
1.	"No Me Queda Más"	Ricky Vela
2.	"Si Una Vez"	A.B. Quintanilla III, Pete Astudillo

La Movida TV show with Veronica Castro
No.	Title	Writer(s)	Length
3.	"No Debes Jugar"	A.B. Quintanilla III, Ricky Vela
4.	"Baila Esta Cumbia"	A.B. Quintanilla III, Pete Astudillo

En Vivo con Ricardo Rocha TV show
No.	Title	Writer(s)	Length
5.	"Amor Prohibido/Bidi Bidi Bom Bom"	Selena Quintanilla, A.B. Quintanilla III, Pete Astudillo
6.	"Como la Flor/Baila Esta Cumbia"	A.B. Quintanilla III, Pete Astudillo
7.	"La Carcacha"	A.B. Quintanilla III, Pete Astudillo

Acapulco Fest 1994
No.	Title	Writer(s)	Length
8.	"La Llamada"	A.B. Quintanilla III, Pete Astudillo
9.	"Como la Flor"	A.B. Quintanilla III, Pete Astudillo

== Charts ==
=== Weekly charts ===
Chart (2007)	Peak position
US Top Latin Albums	28
US Top Regional Mexican Albums	13

Chart (2012)	Peak position
Mexican Albums (Top 100 Mexico)	58
