= Dos Historias =

Greatest hits album by Selena and Ana Bárbara
- Released: February 28, 2006 (U.S.)
- Recorded: 1990–2006
- Genre: Tejano, Latin pop, grupero
- Length: 47:36
- Label: Univision
- Producer: A.B. Quintanilla, Ana Bárbara

Selena chronology
Selena ¡VIVE! (2005)	Dos Historias (2006)	Through the Years / A Traves de los Años (2007)

Ana Bárbara chronology
Confesiones (2005)	Dos Historias (2006)	Más Confesiones (2006)

Dos Historias (English: Two Stories) is a greatest hits album by American Tejano singer Selena and Mexican singer-songwriter Ana Bárbara. It was released on February 28, 2006 by Univision Records.

== Track listing ==
CD
No.	Title	Length
1.	"Como la Flor" (by Selena)	3:05
2.	"La Trampa" (by Ana Bárbara)	3:14
3.	"Amor Prohibido" (by Selena)	2:52
4.	"Lo Busque" (by Ana Bárbara)	4:01
5.	"Fotos y Recuerdos" (by Selena)	2:36
6.	"Todo lo Aprendi de Ti" (by Ana Bárbara)	3:06
7.	"No Me Queda Más" (by Selena)	3:19
8.	"Bandido" (by Ana Bárbara)	3:01
9.	"Tú Sólo Tú" (by Selena)	3:13
10.	"Te Regalo la Lluvia" (by Ana Bárbara)	3:24
11.	"Baila Esta Cumbia" (by Selena)	2:59
12.	"Ya No Te Creo Nada" (by Ana Bárbara)	3:09
13.	"Dreaming of You" (by Selena)	5:16
14.	"Como Me Haces Falta" (by Ana Bárbara)	4:21
Total length:		47:36

DVD
No.	Title	Length
1.	"No Me Queda Más" (Music Video) (by Selena)
2.	"Ya No Te Cero Nada" (Music Video) (by Ana Bárbara)
3.	"Dreaming of You" (Music Video) (by Selena)
4.	"Bandido" (Music Video) (by Ana Bárbara)

== Charts ==
Chart (2006)	Peak position
US Top Latin Albums	21
US Top Regional Mexican Albums	3
