= Ven Conmigo (album) =

Studio album by Selena
- Released: November 12, 1990
- Recorded: 1989–90
- Studios: Zaz Studios (San Antonio, Texas)
- Genres: Tejano; Mexican cumbia; ranchera; Latin pop
- Length: 31:53
- Language: Spanish
- Label: EMI Latin
- Producer: A.B. Quintanilla III

Selena chronology
| 16 Super Éxitos Originales (1990) | Ven Conmigo (1990) | Entre a Mi Mundo (1992) |

Singles from Ven Conmigo
- 1. "Ya Ves" Released: 1990; 2. "Baila Esta Cumbia" Released: 1990; 3. "La Tracalera" Released: 1991

Ven Conmigo (English: Come with Me) is the second studio album by American singer Selena, released on November 12, 1990, by EMI Latin. The singer's brother, A.B. Quintanilla III remained her principal record producer and songwriter after her debut album's moderate success. Selena's Los Dinos band composed and arranged seven of the album's ten tracks; local songwriter Johnny Herrera also provided songs for Selena to record. Ven Conmigo contains half cumbias and half rancheras, though the album includes other genres. Its musical compositions are varied and demonstrate an evolving maturity in Selena's basic Tejano sound. The album's structure and track organization were unconventional compared with other Tejano music albums. The songs on Ven Conmigo are mostly love songs or songs following a woman's struggles after many failed relationships.

After Ven Conmigo's release, the band hired guitarist Chris Pérez who introduced his hard rock sound to the band's music and performances, and further diversified Selena's repertoire. Her promotional tour for the album attracted upwards of 60,000 attendees to her shows, and critics praised the singer's stage presence. The album's single, "Baila Esta Cumbia" was the most played song on local Tejano music radio stations for over a month and helped Selena to tour in Mexico. Ven Conmigo peaked at number three on the US Billboard Regional Mexican Albums chart, her then-highest peaking album. It received critical acclaim, bringing Selena recognition as a Tejano singer and establishing her as a commercial threat.

In October 1991, Ven Conmigo went gold for sales exceeding 50,000 units, making Selena the first female Tejano singer to receive the honor. The event dissolved the male hierarchy in the Tejano music industry, which saw women as commercially inferior. Ven Conmigo received a nomination for the Tejano Music Award for Album of the Year – Orchestra at the 1992 annual event. The album peaked at number 22 on the US Billboard Top Pop Catalog Albums chart after it was ineligible to chart on the Billboard 200 following her shooting death in 1995. In April 2025, the Recording Industry Association of America (RIAA) certified the album quadruple platinum, denoting 240,000 album-equivalent units sold in the United States. In 2019, the album was selected by the Library of Congress for preservation in the United States National Recording Registry for being "culturally, historically, or aesthetically significant".

== Production and development ==
In March 1989, Selena signed with EMI Latin, which had opened a Latin music division with José Behar as president. Though EMI marketed her as a solo artist, her Los Dinos band continued to tour with her. Initially, Behar and Stephen Finfer asked Selena for a crossover album. After recording three demos for the heads of EMI Records' pop division, Charles Koppelman rejected them and suggested Selena perform songs that appealed to her fan base.

Before her debut album with the company, her brother A.B. Quintanilla III had fought to remain the singer's principal producer and songwriter. Feeling they were "gambling" in the Latin music market, EMI Latin entered into an agreement with Quintanilla III that if he failed to produce a successful record he would be replaced by a Grammy Award-winning producer and songwriter. Selena's debut album outperformed other recordings by contemporaneous female Tejano singers and enjoyed moderate success. A.B. was allowed to continue as the singer's producer and songwriter for Ven Conmigo.

== Recording and composition ==
"Baila Esta Cumbia" (1990)
Selena began experimenting with vocal arrangements on her songs, beginning with "Baila Esta Cumbia" which became the hit single that eventually opened the doors for her in Mexico.

Ven Conmigo was recorded at record producer Joey Lopez' Zaz Studios in San Antonio. The band entered the studio "with more musical firepower than ever before". Quintanilla III arranged the album and chose what would be included on it, "carefully select[ing] the songs [that would] jumpstart [Selena's] transition into a larger Latino market". Keyboardist Ricky Vela programmed the entire project, while band members contributed to the recording by composing seven of the album's ten songs. Ven Conmigo contains half cumbias and half rancheras. It includes musical influences from: salsa, rock and roll, rap and soul music, traditional Mexican music, Mexican folk, polka, country, and Colombian music. Abraham Quintanilla Jr.—the group's manager and Selena's father—suggested the idea of having a variety of genres on the album: "I always felt that the buyer, the listener, would enjoy this and would not get bored hearing just one particular style of music." The compositions for the album were musically varied— more "broader-based and more adventurous than any mainstream Tejano act" according to biographer Joe Nick Patoski. Selena and her band were "evolving a rhythmic style that demonstrated its prowess for catchy cumbias".

Ven Conmigo scrapped the conventional styles and track organization of the typical Tejano album of "a two-sided single sandwiched between a bunch of polkas and oldie-but-goodie [songs]". On "Yo Te Amo", the band decided to go with a bridge–interlude format rather than a typical chord progression they had recycled; "[W]e were growing, we were evolving" as Vela later put it. It was "neither Texan nor Mexican" in its form, but a representation of international Spanish music "under the guise of a slow cumbia". Similarly, "Yo Me Voy" has the same qualities as "Yo Te Amo". Vela enjoyed Rocío Dúrcal's 1987 version of "Yo Me Voy", a Juan Gabriel song. He wanted Selena to record it and played Dúrcal's recording to A.B. who agreed that the song would suit Ven Conmigo. A.B. collaborated on the arrangement with Vela. Local songwriter, Johnny Herrera, wrote "Aunque No Salga el Sol", which was originally written for Lisa Lopez as a follow-up to her 1982 number-one single "Si Quieres Verme Llorar". Lopez had rejected the song, finding it weaker than other recordings that were provided to her. Patoski thought the song was "one of the most poetic works ever written by a Texas composer". It was given to Selena to record in 1985 for Bob Grever's record label; she later re-recorded it for Ven Conmigo. Vela used "more percussion and sequencing" than similar pop ballads.

Quintanilla III worked with Pete Astudillo on a concept melody he had thought of while the band was resting following a concert in West Texas. Called "Baila Esta Cumbia" it was recorded for Ven Conmigo. Beginning with this album, Selena started experimenting with vocal arrangements during recording sessions. She added an outro to "Baila Esta Cumbia", her first attempt at adding "counter melodies [sic]" to finished projects; "she would often change vocal [notes] to suit her and what she thought [sounded] better" recalled Chris Pérez. "Baila Esta Cumbia" echoed works by Fito Olivares, and became a hit single in Mexico, "opening the doors" for the group in that country. Astudillo co-wrote the title track, "Ven Conmigo", with A.B. using the same stylistic sounds found in música norteña recordings. Vela and A.B. traveled to Poteet, Texas, and hired David Lee Garza, his brother, and father to play and record the accordion, drums, and bajo sexto, respectively for the track that gave it "a Tejano flavor".

After discovering that Behar invited high-profile pop music executives to the 1990 Tejano Music Awards, Abraham argued that a hip-hop-esque song could impress them and solidify a crossover deal. A.B., Astudillo, and Vela worked on the idea through the night at a Motel 6 in Albuquerque, New Mexico, using eight keyboards, a mixing console, and monitor systems. "[B]ack then we didn't have the fancy computers with all the sequencing" A.B. recalled during a retrospect interview. They created a Spanish-language translation of "Is It the Beat?", an English language demo track she had recorded the previous year, entitled "Enamorada de Ti", a freestyle dance-pop track that drummer Suzette Quintanilla compared to a Top 40 recording that illustrated Selena's "soul side". Selena recorded the track before the Tejano Music Awards on March 9, 1990, and rehearsed a routine with backup dancers for the event. Quintanilla Jr. suggested the idea of reworking the popular Cuban song "Guantanamera" into a house music track. Quintanilla III created an instrumental. Quintanilla Jr. liked it and encouraged Quintanilla III to write lyrics for it, resulting in "No Quiero Saber". Astudillo recalled how he worked with Quintanilla III on the track, noting that "No Quiero Saber" was lyrically different from their repertoire of love songs and the heartache of failed relationships.

== Promotion ==
The night before the photo shoot for the album, Selena cut and dyed her hair jet black and stained a small patch of skin behind her ear. She insisted on a black-and-white photograph of her posing with a mohawk to distract from the stain. EMI Latin was adamantly opposed to the singer shortening her hair and its styling. They wanted to market her based on beauty standards at that time, and believed the style would have a negative impact on Selena's "good girl" image.

Roger Garcia, the band's lead guitarist, got married before Ven Conmigo was released. Quintanilla III discovered 17-year old Pérez, who was the guitarist for Shelly Lares. He auditioned to be part of the group. Quintanilla III's music production style was Pérez' inspiration to become part of Selena y Los Dinos. At first, Quintanilla Jr. dismissed Pérez, seeing him as more of a rocker, feeling he was ill-equipped for a Tejano band. Betty Cortina, editor-at-large for People magazine, wrote that Pérez was the antithesis of Quintanilla Jr.'s "clean-cut good kids" image. Quintanilla III persuaded Abraham that Pérez was capable of performing Tejano music, adding that his rocker image was harmless. Pérez was hired as the band's guitarist after the band finished recording Ven Conmigo. Critics felt Pérez' hard rock style combined with Selena's basic Tejano sound, added to her already diverse musical repertoire.

Selena's concerts began to attract upwards of 60,000 attendees. She shared a Houston venue with La Mafia and Emilio Navaira that drew 9,000 spectators in the summer of 1991. She later shared another venue with Ramón Ayala, Olivares, and Pandora at the ninth annual Hispanic State Fair in San Antonio. Selena was invited to the Johnny Canales Show in 1991, her third appearance. The show introduced Pérez as the band's new guitarist. He seemed "unsure of himself as he practiced his Temptations-style dance steps in time to the music". Author Joe Nick Patoski described Pérez's choreography on the show as "tentative", however, "the rock licks he played on his guitar were like spitfire, bringing a hard edge to the band that it had previously lacked." Vilma Maldonado of The Monitor wrote that Selena can "sing [and] improvises [her] dances" calling her "unpredictable, attractive, and talented" after an April 1991 concert. The Fort Worth Star-Telegram described Selena's performance at a Cinco de Mayo celebration as "electrifying". Selena performed the title track as a duet with A.B. which was called "one of the highlights of the performance". Three singles were released from the album including "Ya Ves", "Baila Esta Cumbia", and "La Tracalera". "Baila Esta Cumbia" was the most played song on local Tejano music radio stations for a month and a half, leading to the band touring Mexico for the first time. It was later certified six times platinum by the Recording Industry Association of America (RIAA) for 360,000 digital sales. Promotional single, "Ya Ves" was the most played song on KTXZ-AM for five consecutive weeks, beginning on October 25, 1990. While promotional singles "Yo Te Amo" reached number six, and "Yo Me Voy" reached number eight.

== Critical reception ==
Professional ratings
Review scores
| Source | Rating |
|---|---|
| Allmusic | 3/5 stars |

Following the album's release, Selena was called the Gloria Estefan, Janet Jackson, and Madonna of Tejano music. Selena responded to these comparisons saying she did not like to be stereotyped. She explained: "I think it's good to be different, and if you're first at it, it's even better." Selena's popularity "surged" following Ven Conmigo's release. It was the first album to bring her recognition within her field of music, and established her name on the Tejano music scene "as a true artist to be reckoned with". The album expanded Selena's "vocal talents", and made her "unstoppable". Ven Conmigo was nominated for the Tejano Music Award for Album of the Year – Orchestra, while its single "Baila Esta Cumbia" was nominated for Single of the Year and Song of the Year. The single "Yo Te Amo" was nominated for Vocal Duo of the Year at the 1992 Tejano Music Awards. Selena received her third consecutive win for Female Vocalist of the Year and Female Entertainer of the Year.

Ven Conmigo debuted at number eight on the US Billboard Regional Mexican Albums chart the week ending November 3, 1990. It was the highest debut album of that week, and surpassed Selena as her highest debuting album on the chart at the time. The following week, the album fell to number ten. It reached number six on the Regional Mexican Albums chart in its sixth week, surpassing Selena as her highest charting album, before peaking at number three. Ven Conmigo remained in the top ten on the Regional Mexican Albums chart for 16 consecutive weeks before falling into the top 15. It surpassed the record for most weeks on the chart for a female Tejano album—56 weeks. At the same time "Baila Esta Cumbia" reached number eight on local Tejano radio stations' list of the most requested songs for that week. Ven Conmigo ended 1991 as the fourth best-selling Regional Mexican Album.

In October 1991, Ven Conmigo went gold for sales exceeding 50,000 units, the first Tejano album by a woman to receive a gold certification. This dissolved the male hierarchy in the Tejano music industry where women were seen as commercially inferior. It also ended the long-standing view that a female performer could not draw comparable audiences to a man. Selena later said in an interview: "[T]he more doors they shut on us, the more determined we became. We've just started seeing a change." She credited the gold certification to EMI Latin's marketing team, and felt it inspired other women in the field to believe they were capable of producing gold records. Following the album's certification, Selena performed at a 2,000-seat McAllen, Texas venue owned by Nano Ramírez who had denied her the opportunity to play there earlier in her career.

On March 31, 1995, Selena was shot and killed by Yolanda Saldívar, her friend and former manager of her boutiques. The resulting media attention helped increase sales of Ven Conmigo. It debuted at number 24 on the US Billboard Top Pop Catalog Albums chart. It was ineligible to chart on the Billboard 200 following a revision that excluded titles older than 18 months appearing on it. The following week, Ven Conmigo peaked at number 22, while her 17 Super Éxitos (1993) compilation album spent its second week at number one. In 1995, catalog titles made up nearly 50% of the music consumed in the United States. Ven Conmigo and 17 Super Éxitos contributed to the $5 billion revenue reported that year by the music industry. The RIAA certified the album platinum for shipments of 200,000 units in the United States; her fifth platinum record. In April 2025, the RIAA updated the certification to quadruple platinum, denoting 240,000 album-equivalent units sold.

== Track listing ==
All tracks are written by Pete Astudillo and A.B. Quintanilla III, and produced by Quintanilla III, except where noted. Credits adapted from the liner notes of Ven Conmigo

| No. | Title | Writer(s) | Length |
|---|---|---|---|
| 1. | "Ya Ves" | | 3:13 |
| 2. | "Aunque No Salga el Sol" | Johnny Herrera | 3:24 |
| 3. | "Ven Conmigo" | | 2:26 |
| 4. | "Yo Te Amo" (duet with Pete Astudillo) | | 3:39 |
| 5. | "Enamorada de Ti" | | 4:05 |
| 6. | "La Tracalera" | Herrera | 2:50 |
| 7. | "Baila Esta Cumbia" | | 2:57 |
| 8. | "Yo Me Voy" | Juan Gabriel | 3:28 |
| 9. | "No Quiero Saber" | | 2:54 |
| 10. | "Después de Enero" | Herrera | 2:57 |
| Total length: | | | 31:53 |

2002 re-release bonus tracks
| No. | Title | Writer(s) | Producer(s) | Length |
|---|---|---|---|---|
| 11. | "No Quiero Saber" (2000 mix) | | | 3:34 |
| 12. | "Enamorada de Ti" (club mix) | | | 6:07 |
| 13. | "Spoken Liner Notes" (commentary recollections provided by Selena's family, friends, and her band) | Nir Seroussi | Suzette Quintanilla | 13:39 |
| 14. | "No Quiero Saber" (music video) | | | 3:37 |

== Credits and personnel ==
Credits adapted from the liner notes of Ven Conmigo.

- Selena – vocals, background vocals
- Pete Astudillo – background vocals, duet with Selena on "Yo Te Amo"
- A.B. Quintanilla – background vocals, arranger, bass guitar, record producer
- Juan Gabriel – composer
- Ricky Vela – arranger, keyboards, sequencer
- Suzette Quintanilla – drums
- David Lee Garza – accordion
- Johnny Herrera – composer
- Joe Ojeda – arranger, keyboards
- Adam Garza – drums
- Roger Garcia – guitar
- Gilbert Velasquez – mixer, music engineer, guitar
- Robert Lopez – art direction

== Charts ==
=== Weekly charts ===
| Chart (1990–95) | Peak position |
|---|---|
| US Regional Mexican Albums | 3 |
| US Top Pop Catalog Albums | 22 |

=== Year-end charts ===
| Chart (1991) | Peak position |
|---|---|
| US Regional Mexican Albums | 4 |

== Certifications and sales ==
| Region | Certification | Certified units/sales |
|---|---|---|
| United States (RIAA) | 4× Platinum (Latin) | 240,000^{‡} |
^{‡} Sales+streaming figures based on certification alone.

== See also ==
- 1990 in Latin music
- Billboard Regional Mexican Albums Year-end Chart, 1990s
- Selena albums discography
- Latin American music in the United States
- Women in Latin music

== Bibliography ==
- "RIAA Gold & Platinum". RIAA.com.
- "Ven Conmigo". AllMusic.
- "Tejano Music Past Award Winners". Texas Talent Association. Archived from the original on September 30, 2000.
- "Tejano Singles Chart > October 25, 1990". Austin American-Statesman. October 25, 1990 – via Newspaperspapers.com.
- "Regional Mexican Albums > November 3, 1990". Billboard. Vol. 102, no. 43. November 3, 1990.
- "Tejano Singles Chart > November 15, 1990". Austin American-Statesman. November 15, 1990 – via Newspaperspapers.com.
- "Regional Mexican Albums > November 17, 1990". Billboard. November 17, 1990.
- "Tejano Singles Chart > December 20, 1990". Austin American-Statesman. December 13, 1990 – via Newspaperspapers.com.
- "Tejano Singles Chart > January 10, 1991". Austin American-Statesman. January 10, 1991 – via Newspaperspapers.com.
- "Regional Mexican Albums > January 12, 1991". Billboard. January 12, 1991.
- "Regional Mexican Albums > March 23, 1991". Billboard. March 23, 1991.
- "Regional Mexican Albums > June 15, 1991". Billboard. June 15, 1991.
- "1991 The Year in Music". Billboard. Vol. 103, no. 52. December 21, 1991.
- "1992 Tejano Music Award Nominees". Colorado Springs Hispania News. January 8, 1992 – via NewspapersArchive.com.
- "Tejano musicians celebrate good times at Cinco de Mayo". Fort Worth Star-Telegram. April 26, 1993.
- "Top Pop Catalog Albums > May 6, 1995". Billboard. Vol. 107, no. 8. May 6, 1995.
- "Top Pop Catalog Albums > May 12, 1995". Billboard. Vol. 107, no. 9. May 12, 1995.
- "Selena hits gold on, off stage — Singer's wedding, break-through album highlight of 1990". San Antonio Express-News. March 26, 1996.
- "October 2002 RIAA Certifications". Billboard. Vol. 114, no. 47. November 23, 2002.
- "Selena: Biography". Biography. November 26, 2007. A&E.
- "Capitol Latin/EMI Celebrates Selena's Life and Music with New 'Performances' DVD, Capturing Never Before Released Footage from Her 1993 & 1994 Appearances on 'The Johnny Canales Show'". PR Newswire.
- "National Recording Registry Class Produces Ultimate 'Stay at Home' Playlist". Library of Congress. March 25, 2020.
- Behar, Jose (June 10, 1995). "Discography". Billboard. Vol. 107, no. 23.
- Blumenthal, Howard J. (1998). The World Music CD Listener's Guide. New York, NY: Billboard Books. ISBN 0-8230-7663-6.
- Clark, Michael (March 25, 2005). "Ten years after her murder, Selena lives on". Corpus Christi Caller-Times.
- Garza, Thelma (March 29, 1996). "Recordings Show Depth, Breadth of Selena's Talent". The Desert Sun – via Newspapers.com.
- Jasinski, Laurie E. (2012). Handbook of Texas Music. Texas A&M University Press. ISBN 978-0876112977.
- Jones, Veda Boyd (2013). Selena. The Great Hispanic Heritage. Infobase Learning. ISBN 978-1438146379.
- Lopetegui, Enrique (April 8, 1995). "A Crossover Dream Halted Prematurely, Tragically Some Ambitious Plans Were Under Way to Bring Selena to Mainstream U.S. Audience". Los Angeles Times. Archived from the original on November 7, 2012.
- Maldonado, Vilma (April 24, 1991). "Selena". The Monitor – via Newspapers.com.
- Maldonado, Vilma (October 31, 1991). "Selena y Los Dinos Receives Gold Album". The Monitor – via Newspapers.com.
- Maldonado, Vilma (April 15, 1994). "When Hard Work Pays Off, Why Do Crowds Boo?". The Monitor – via Newspapers.com.
- Minnick, Doug (September 24, 2010). "Jose Behar, interview". Taxi A&R. Archived from the original on January 30, 2015.
- Patoski, Joe Nick (1996). Selena: Como La Flor. Boston: Little Brown and Company. ISBN 0-316-69378-2.
- Peña, Manuel (2002). Música Tejana. Texas A&M University. ISBN 978-0-89096-888-8.
- Pérez, Chris (2012). To Selena, with Love. Penguin Books. ISBN 978-1-101-58026-4.
- Quintanilla, Selena (1989). Selena (Media notes). A.B. Quintanilla (producer), Suzette Quintanilla (spoken liner notes producer). EMI Latin. 724354099403.
- Quintanilla, Selena (1990). Ven Conmigo (Media notes). A.B. Quintanilla (producer), Suzette Quintanilla (spoken liner notes producer). EMI Latin.
- Ramirez, Sara A. (1997). "The Life of a True Reina". La Voz. 27–31.
- Ramirez, Rauly (March 31, 2015). "Celebrating Selena on her 20th anniversary". Billboard. Archived from the original on April 8, 2018.
- Richmond, Clint (1995). Selena: The Phenomenal Life and Tragic Death of the Tejano Music Queen. Pocket Books. ISBN 0671545221.
- Ruiz, Geraldo (1995). The Last Song. El Diario Books. ISBN 1887599010.
- Stacy, Lee (2002). Mexico and the United States. New York: Marshall Cavendish. ISBN 0-7614-7402-1.
- Tarradell, Ramiro (March 30, 2000). "A Decade of Selena 10 albums showcase the music behind the legend". The Dallas Morning News.
- Tirella, Joseph M. (August 1995). "Just the Facts". Vibe. 3 (6): 138.
- Verhovek, Sam Howe (April 1, 1995). "Grammy-Winning Singer Selena Killed in Shooting at Texas Motel". The New York Times. p. 1. Archived from the original on July 20, 2016.
