= Enamorada de Ti =

Remix album by Selena
- Released: 3 April 2012
- Recorded: 2011–January 2012
- Genre: Latin pop, pop rock
- Length: 34:38
- Label: Capitol Latin, Q-Productions
- Producer: Sergio Lopes, Leslie Ahrens, Andres Castro, Moogie Canazio, Cesar Lemons, Humberto Gatica

Selena chronology
La Leyenda (2010)	Enamorada de Ti (2012)	Lo Mejor de...Selena (2015)

Singles from Enamorada de Ti
- 1. "Amor Prohibido" Released: 7 February 2012; 2. "Como la Flor" Released: 19 March 2012

Selena remix chronology
Anthology (1998)	Enamorada de Ti (2012)	Moonchild Mixes (2022)

Enamorada de Ti (English: In Love with You) is the second remix album by American Tejano singer Selena. It was released posthumously on 3 April 2012 through Capitol Latin and Q-Productions. Enamorada de Ti was produced by Sergio Lopes, Leslie Ahrens, Andres Castro, Moggie Canazio, Cesar Lemons and Chilean record producer Humberto Gatica. Gatica had the idea of modernizing songs recorded by Selena into today's popular music genres. Selena's family had already been working on a similar idea, but they set it aside in favor of Enamorada de Ti, which had gained the approval of Capitol Latin. The selection of artists to sing duets with Selena began in late summer 2011. Gatica and Selena's family chose American singer and actress Selena Gomez, Puerto Rican singer Don Omar, Samuel "Samo" Parra from the Mexican rock band Camila, Mexican singer Cristian Castro, Spanish DJ mixer Juan Magan, and the Carlos Santana band, while the remaining songs selected were remixed.

Recording sessions began shortly after the selected artists had been chosen. Once Selena's family released confirmation of a duets album in January 2012, it quickly caught media attention. Gomez used her Twitter account to promote the album's release, a move that Gatica praised. Castro and Samo performed their respective duets from the album during the 2012 Latin Billboard Music Awards. The duet version of "Amor Prohibido" was released digitally on iTunes on 7 February 2012. It peaked at number eight on the US Billboard Latin Pop Airplay chart. Other songs on the album, including the title track (duet with Magan), "Como la Flor" (duet with Castro), "Bidi Bidi Bom Bom" (duet with Gomez), and "Fotos y Recuerdos" (duet with Omar), entered the Billboard Latin digital charts for the first time since their original release in the 1990s.

Enamorada de Ti debuted and peaked at number one on the US Billboard Top Latin Albums and Latin Pop Albums charts. It remained at number one on the latter for two consecutive weeks. After debuting and peaking at number 135 on the Billboard 200 chart, the recording slipped off the chart and never returned, as sales declined. Enamorada de Ti peaked at number 56 on the Mexican Albums Chart. The album received a mixed response from music critics, many of whom preferred the original recordings. Carlos Quintana of About.com named Enamorada de Ti one of the "Best Latin Music Albums of the Year, So Far" and one of the "Most Popular Albums of the Year" in 2012.

== Quintanilla family project ==
In 2008, Selena's brother and former principal record producer A.B. Quintanilla III, known as A.B., was planning to quit music and leave the Kumbia All Starz, the successor of Kumbia Kings. Their father and manager, Abraham Quintanilla, Jr., told A.B. that he did not want him to quit music, saying that his dream was that his children would continue in the music industry and never give up. In 2009, after performing to an enthusiastic crowd in Bolivia, A.B. decided to continue recording music.

A.B. and Abraham then planned to release an album featuring Selena, who was murdered in 1995 by her ex-employee Yolanda Saldivar. Their aim was to update Selena's music for the modern music industry. They intended to take vocals from five previously unreleased songs that Selena had recorded before signing a recording contract with Capitol Latin (then EMI Latin) in 1989. The vocals would then be combined into new songs to create a full-length album, as if Selena were still alive.

They announced their forthcoming project in the Spanish media, stating that they were choosing ten songs for the album and that it would be released in the fall of 2011 or early in 2012. In the end they created several more songs than they had planned. When asked if the album might be released in March 2012, marking the 17th anniversary of Selena's death, Abraham said that it was a possibility. Many media outlets called it a remix album. Abraham told the press that it would be released in five volumes, with ten tracks on each.

The projected album was to include five previously unreleased a cappella songs, which were remastered and remixed. Some of the songs in the album were to be duets with Tejano artists, who donated their time to record new tracks featuring Selena. The song "Soy Amiga" ("I'm A Friend"), which first appeared in 1986 on Selena's third LP record, Alpha, was transformed from a Spanish ballad into a modern cumbia recording. The album's central themes would be Abraham's influence on his children's love of music, and bringing Selena's music "back to life". Abraham began negotiating with Capitol Latin to help distribute and market the album throughout the United States.

== Production ==
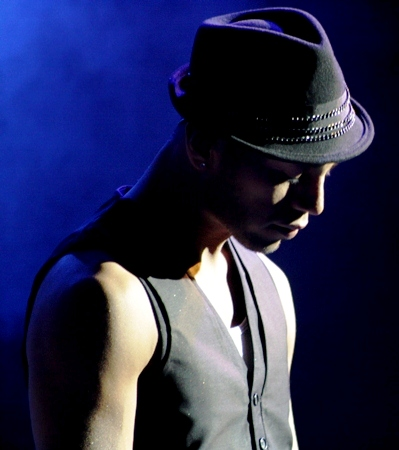
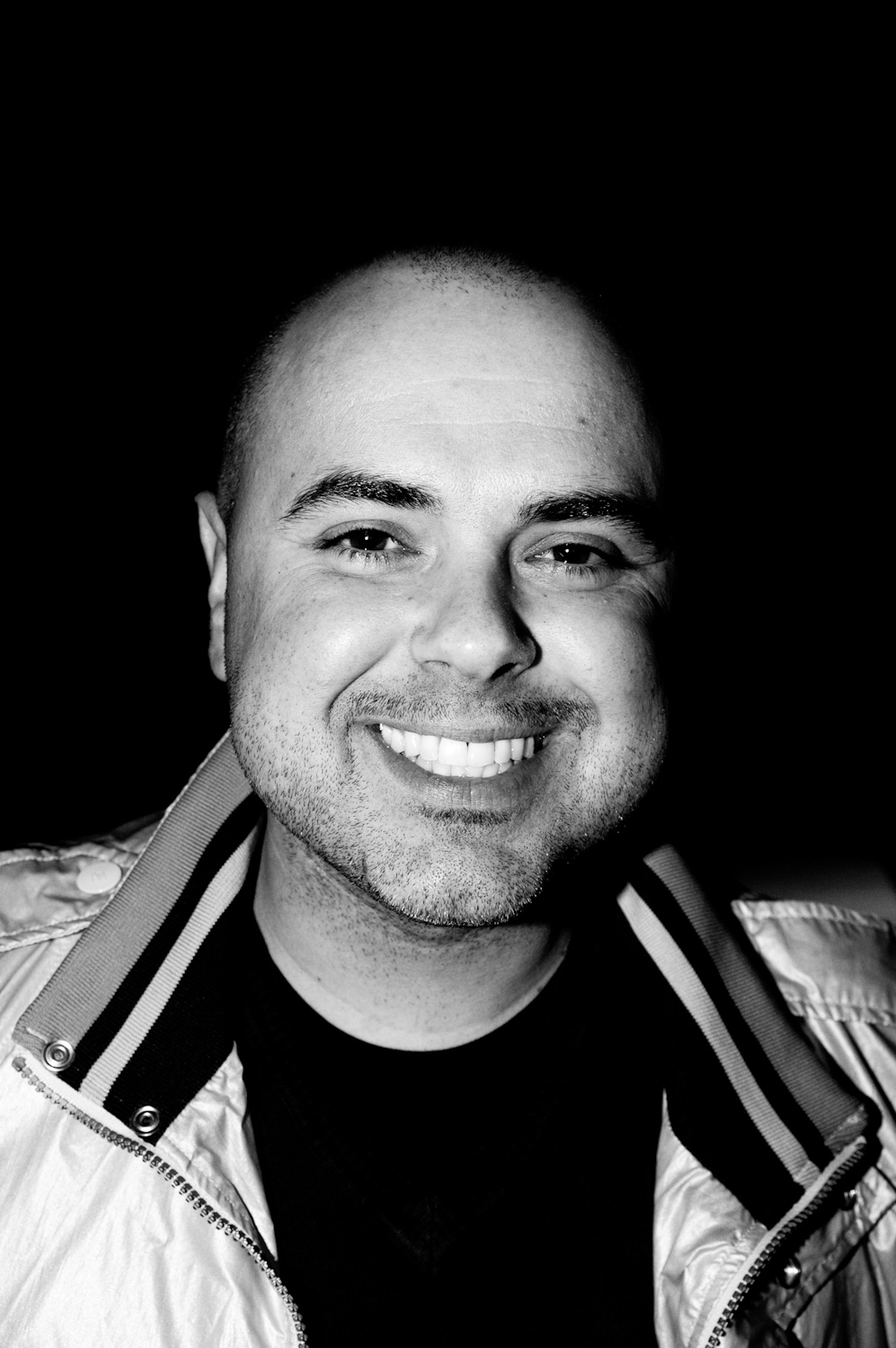
Samo (pictured left) and Juan Magan (pictured right) are among several artists who recorded a duet with Selena on Enamorada de Ti.

In the fall of 2011, Chilean record producer Humberto Gatica and Capitol Latin senior vice president Sergio Lopes had the idea of turning Selena's songs into duets in popular music genres. In contrast to the Quintanilla family project, which had been using only Tejano artists, Gatica and Lopes wanted a diverse group. Forty-six artists and eight producers showed an interest in working on the project, and Gatica held a press conference with the Quintanilla family for their input. Abraham chose Selena Gomez to record "Bidi Bidi Bom Bom" because of her live cover of the song during several of her concerts. Selena's sister Suzette Quintanilla, formerly drummer of Selena y Los Dinos, chose Samuel "Samo" Parra from the Mexican band Camila, saying that she chose him because she was a huge fan of Camila. Puerto Rican reggaeton singer Don Omar, Mexican singer Christian Castro, Spanish DJ mixer Juan Magan, and the Carlos Santana band were chosen by Capitol Latin. Other artists, such as Cuban American rapper Pitbull, Mexican singers Paulina Rubio and Thalía, Colombian singer Carlos Vives, and Cuban singer Gloria Estefan, were rejected for unspecified reasons, and many other artists could not part take in the project because of scheduling conflicts.

After meeting with the Quintanilla family, Lopes observed young fans at the Selena Museum in Corpus Christi, Texas, and their crying became his inspiration for the album. During pre-production, Lopes extracted Selena's vocals from studio recordings and created a "live album" version using other musicians, such as English singer-songwriter Sting, Mexican guitarist Carlos Santana, American blues rock singer John Mayer, and Puerto Rican singer Luis Miguel. Recording sessions took place in ten different recording studios: Artco Recording Studios in Mexico; East West Recording Studios in Los Angeles; Miami Beat Studios in Miami; Move Studios in Los Angeles; NRG Studios in Los Angeles; Ocean Way Recording Studios in Los Angeles; On the Groove Studios in Miami; Saai Studios in Miami; The Village Studios in Los Angeles; and Vanquish Studios in Davie, Florida.

== Songs ==
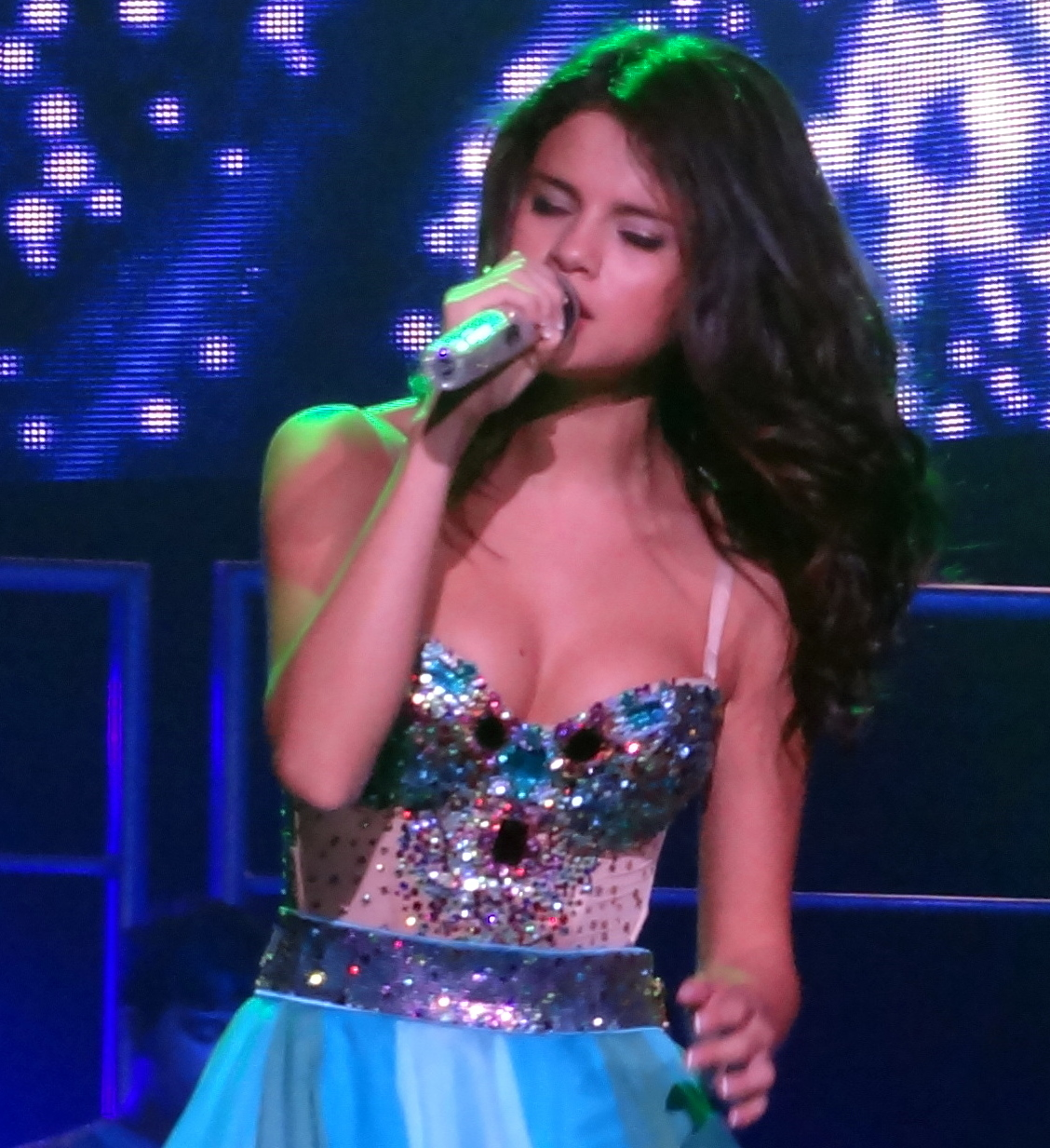
Selena Gomez' (pictured) duet with Selena on "Bidi Bidi Bom Bom" received generally positive response from music critics.

Samo, who sang in "Amor Prohibido", told the Ecuadoran newspaper El Telégrafo that he had always dreamed of recording a duet with Selena and that "Amor Prohibido" was one of his favorite songs. He said he felt the "presence of Selena" as soon as he put his headphones on and began recording. Joey Guerra of the San Antonio Express-News believed that the lead single "proved a solid preview for the album" and that its "wistful lyrics work nicely as a duet with Samo". Guerra described the song as a "gentle pop-rock arrangement" and felt that this arrangement might have been how it was intended. Nilan Lovelace of Reporter Magazine called the remix version of "Amor Prohibido" an "album favorite" and believed it to be the type of music that Selena would be recording today.

The duet with Gomez in "Bidi Bidi Bom Bom" had a mixed reception. The Belfast Telegraph wrote that Gomez had done an "amazing job". At the Billboard Latin Music Awards in Miami, A.B. told E! that Gomez gave a "fantastic vocal performance on the record". Gomez told JustJared.com, "I was completely honored when they asked me to be on the tribute CD and when I went into the studio to record they actually had her vocals in the booth that she was in, so I felt like she was singing right next to me, it gave me chills! It was incredible and it was a great experience and it was a great song." Domingo Banda of the Semana News called "Bidi Bidi Bom Bom" a "standout track". Guerra, however, wrote that the new version of "Bidi Bidi Bom Bom" was "virtually the same arrangement as the original. It would have been more effective reshaped as a poppy club track." He found Gomez' vocals "curiously lackluster", as if she was "scared of the song" and "intimidated by her idol". Lovelace commented that it was "obvious that Spanish isn't Gomez' first language, and comes in a distant second", and that "Gomez' odd voice" came across as sometimes "much higher and very squeaky when speaking Spanish", concluding that it "doesn’t match the rest of the song and momentarily brings everything to a halt".

Guerra wrote that the remix of "No Me Queda Más", which includes a classical piano in its introduction, "is given a soft piano arrangement that highlights [Selena's] rich, throaty delivery but ultimately pales compared to the original". Guerra noted that Suzette's vocals had been removed from "Tus Desprecios" and thought that the new, "somber arrangement" failed to complement the "sassy" lyrics. Banda praised the recording's use of choirs and piano and the way the rhythm of the "Tus Desprecios" remix complemented Selena's voice.

Enamorada de Ti (duet with Juan Magan)
The remix version of "Enamorada de Ti" was transformed into a menegrue duet with Juan Magan and features the trumpets in the background.

Amor Prohibido (duet with Samo)
The remix version of "Amor Prohibido" features Mexican singer Samo and received positive reviews from music critics who complemented the musical arrangements.

Banda liked Christian Castro's interpretation of "Como la Flor" in his duet, as did Carlos Quintana from About.com, who also admired its "bolero-ranchero" arrangements. Guerra described "Como La Flor" as "an elegant mariachi pairing", praising Castro's blending and rhythm but finding the duet less emotionally powerful than the original. Lovelace gave a negative assessment of "Como La Flor", believing Castro to be a poor choice for it.

Enrique Lopetegui of the San Antonio Current described "Fotos y Recuerdos" as a "reggaeton-ish" remix. Guerra saw it as "stuck in a battle between cumbia and reggaeton rhythms", noticing a slightly faster tempo. He wrote that "Ya No" "exhibits some punch", but he preferred the original to the new, "Santana-esque" version. Quintana praised the electric guitar of "Ya No" and its "tropical beat" in the background. Banda commented that the track blended Tejano cumbia and electronic sounds, and he praised its new guitar chords. In "Techno Cumbia 2012", Guerra liked the "playful guitar" but found nothing else praiseworthy. He found the interpretation of "El Chico del Apartamento 512" acceptable but lacking in force, and suggested that Gomez might have fared better on this track. Banda called "El Chico del Apartamento 512" a "relaxed reggae" track.

The title track, "Enamorada de Ti", received a favorable review from Guerra, who believed that its merengue version "manages to work up a considerable sweat". Calling it a "tropical rhythm", Banda noted that it is the earliest-recorded track on the album. Lopetegui considered it "crowd-pleasing". Lovelace thought it "enjoyable", saying that the merengue mix version "adds a lively, tropical tone to the original slow tempo love song", but he added that it "seems awkwardly paired when it comes to collaborating artists, who often clash with Selena's voice and the overall sound". Of the acoustic bonus tracks, Guerra wrote that they are "unlikely highlights, the new instrumentation gives them all a nice edge and highlights Selena's burgeoning vocal prowess". Banda was more positive, listing them as recommended tracks that he found to be reminiscent of live Selena recordings.

== Release ==
Latina magazine released a snippet of the acoustic track of "Cobarde" on 30 March 2012. Enamorada de Ti was released on 3 April 2012 through Capitol Latin and Q-Productions. A deluxe edition of the album was released through Wal-Mart on the same day, with three additional acoustic tracks. On iTunes, the Juan Magan remix of "Is It the Beat?" was added as a bonus track. Verizon Wireless made an acoustic version of "Amor Prohibido" available as a ringtone.

The album debuted at number one on the US Top Latin Albums and Latin Pop Albums charts. It debuted and peaked at number 135 on Billboard 200 and at number 117 on the Billboard Comprehensive Albums chart. It was number one on the Latin Pop Albums chart for two consecutive weeks. On the week ending 8 April 2012, it peaked at number 57 on Top 100 Mexico. It knocked Ednita Nazario's Desnuda (2012) off the top of both Top Latin Albums and Latin Pop Albums. Carlos Quintana of About.com named Enamorada de Ti one of the "Best Latin Music Albums of the Year, So Far" and one of the "Most Popular Albums of the Year" in 2012. The album was the 65th best-selling Latin album of 2012, and the 19th best-selling Latin pop album of 2012.

The lead single, "Amor Prohibido", was released digitally on 28 February 2012. It peaked at number 39 on the Latin Tropical Airplay chart, number 23 on Hot Latin Tracks, number 8 on Latin Pop Songs, and number 8 on Latin Regional Mexican Digital Songs. It also reached singles music charts in Colombia, Ecuador, Venezuela and Peru. The second single to be released digitally was the duet version of "Como La Flor", with Christian Castro. It was released in Colombia on 14 August 2012.

Because of the commercial success of Enamorada de Ti, Capitol Latin confirmed a trilogy of Selena remix/duet albums. In May 2012, Capitol Latin confirmed an English-language followup. By February 2012, Canadian singer Michael Bublé was confirmed as one of many other artists who expressed interest in recording a duet with Selena. In late August 2012, fans were asked to fill out a survey from the official Selena Facebook page, inviting them to choose three Latin singers and three non-Latin singers they would like to see recording a duet with Selena on the follow-up album. Guerra suggested La Mafia's Oscar de la Rosa, Jennifer Lopez, Blake Shelton, Drake, Bruno Mars and Beyoncé Knowles.

== Promotion ==
Several music and talk shows, including E!, the Cristina Show, Sábado Gigante, El Gordo y la Flaca and Acceso Total, competed in releasing the news to their viewers. Gomez earned praise from Gatica by using her Twitter account to tell her fans about the album's release. Castro and Samo performed their respective duets from the album during the 2012 Latin Billboard Music Awards. Quintana of About.com wrote, "they delivered one of the most touching performances of the night with the songs 'Como La Flor' and 'Amor Prohibido'". Capitol Latin created a website to promote the album.

== Critical reception ==
Professional ratings
Review scores
Source	Rating
AllMusic	3/5 stars
San Antonio Current	2.5/5 stars
About.com	3.5/5 stars
San Antonio Express-News	(mixed)
Reporter Magazine	(unfavorable)
Latina	(favorable)

Enamorada de Ti received mixed reviews. A writer for Semana News called the duets "unique collaborations". Domingo Banda, also writing for Semana News, said that Selena's voice sounded very much alive and vibrant again. Enrique Lopetegui of the San Antonio Current wrote that diehard Selena fans "will take the new pop duet of 'Amor Prohibido' with Camila's Samo over the cheesy cumbia original anytime". Lopetegui described "Cobarde", "Si Una Vez", and "No Quiero Saber" as "unplugged" because of their "superb acoustic guitar[s]". Furthermore, Lopetegui complimented the technology used in the album to "change the tempo of Selena's original track without changing the pitch, and her duet with Christian Castro is proof of technology put to good use". He found "Fotos y Recuerdos" and the title track "unbearable", however, and advised his readers to be prepared to skip them.

Stephen Thomas Erlewine from AllMusic wrote that Enamorada de Ti gave a good idea of how Selena might have sounded in 2012. Erlewine commented that "Amor Prohibido", as updated for the album, "ha[d] much of its overly stiff drum machines stripped away, replaced with warmer studio musicians". Far from making Selena sound contemporary, he thought that all the remixed songs "are rooted in the '90s and sound that way", even if "fresher" than many other posthumous Selena releases. Guerra wrote that Enamorada de Ti included "reworked gems", but he believed that it felt rushed and dated. Unlike the remixes, he found the originals "still fresh almost two decades later". He disapproved of the acoustic and the slowing down of the music's arrangements. Guerra concluded that Selena's legacy "deserves better than this half-hearted attempt", and that better duet partners and producers (he named René Pérez Joglar from Calle 13, RedOne, Ximena Sariñana, and Cachorro López) could have made Enamorada de Ti "a fascinating tribute to Selena".

Quintana from About.com believed the duets on Enamorada de Ti underlined the "timeless appeal" of Selena's music. He observed that the album is musically diverse, with examples of bolero ("No Me Queda Mas"), ranchera ("Como La Flor"), cumbia ("Techno Cumbia"), reggaeton ("Fotos y Recuerdo"), Latin pop ("Amor Prohibido") and merengue ("Enamorada de Ti"). Quintana was unsurprised by the excitement of Selena fans, calling Enamorada de Ti a "very experimental project" that "introduces a new sound to the music [of Selena]". He concluded that the experiment was worthwhile and that the album is a good introduction to Selena's repertoire. Lovelace of Reporter Magazine found Gomez' "awkward" and "squeaky" voice unsuitable and believed that Castro was not the right choice for "Como La Flor". "If you're new to Spanish-speaking music," he wrote, "you'll enjoy the mixes. If not, avoid them at all cost." Then, however, he judged all the songs except "Como La Flor", "Bidi Bidi Bom Bom", and the title track to be "excellent ... catchy and appropriate 2012-spin". Sugey Palomares of Latina called Enamorada de Ti a "groundbreaking and emotional musical project".

== Track listing ==
No.	Title	Writer(s)	Length
1.	"No Me Queda Más"	Ricky Vela	3:11
2.	"Amor Prohibido" (featuring Samo)	Selena Quintanilla-Pérez, Pete Astudillo, A.B. Quintanilla III	4:26
3.	"Tus Desprecios"	Quintanilla III, Vela	3:32
4.	"Como la Flor" (featuring Cristian Castro)	Selena, Astudillo, Quintanilla III	2:56
5.	"Fotos y Recuerdos" (featuring Don Omar)	Chrissie Hynde	3:13
6.	"Bidi Bidi Bom Bom" (featuring Selena Gomez)	Selena, Astudillo	4:15
7.	"Ya No" (featuring the Carlos Santana Band)	Quintanilla III, Vela, Chris Pérez	3:28
8.	"Techno Cumbia 2012"	Pete Astudillo, A.B. Quintanilla III	3:15
9.	"El Chico del Apartamento 512"	Quintanilla III, Ricky Vela	3:28
10.	"Enamorada de Ti" (featuring Juan Magan)	Astudillo, Quintanilla III	2:59

iTunes Bonus Track
No.	Title	Writer(s)	Length
11.	"Is It the Beat?" (Juan Magan Mix)	Pamela Phillips Oland, Quintanilla III	3:27

Walmart Special Edition
No.	Title	Writer(s)	Length
11.	"Cobarde" (Acoustic Version)	José Luis Borrego	2:43
12.	"Si Una Vez" (Acoustic Version)	Quintanilla III, Astudillo	2:35
13.	"No Quiero Saber" (Acoustic Version)	Quintanilla III, Astudillo	2:36

== Personnel ==
Credits are adapted from AllMusic.

- Composer - A.B. Quintanilla III
- Viola - Aaron Otlman
- Bateria - Aaron Sterling
- Coros - Adriana Foster
- Mezcla - Akihiro Nishimura
- Violin - Alan Busteed
- Arreglos, Mezcla - Andres Castro
- Violin - Anna Kostyuchek
- Mezcla - Antonio "Moogie" Canazio
- Coros - Carlos Murguia
- Coros, Mezcla - Cesar Lemos
- Composer - Chrissie Hynde
- Featured Artist - Christian Castro
- Mezcla - Cristian Robles
- Mezcla - Dan Warner
- Coros - Descemer Bueno
- Featured Artist - Don Omar
- Mezcla - Edgar Barrera
- Mezcla - Favio Esquivel
- Coros - Francis Benitez
- Arreglos - Francisco Loyo
- Coros - Gisa Vatcky
- Mezcla - Howard Willing
- Mezcla - Jeremy Miller
- Arreglos, Featured Artist - Juan Magan
- Violin - Karen Elaine
- Coros - Kenny O'Brien
- Coros - Liza Quintana
- Percussion - Luis Conte
- Mezcla - Marcos Ruiz
- Mezcla - Mario Caroscio
- Vihuela - Mario Hernandez
- Organo, Piano - Michel Ferre
- Mezcla - Milton Restituyo
- Violin - Mishkar Nunez Mejia
- Coros - Orlando Mosqueda
- Bateria - Paul Votteler
- Guitarron - Pedro Hernandez
- Composer - Pepe Astudillo
- Mezcla - Ramon 'El Ingeniero' Casillas
- Trombone - Ramon Benitez
- Percussion - Ramon Calderas
- Bateria - Ricardo "Tiki" Pasillas
- Percussion - Richard Bravo
- Composer - Ricky Vela
- Mezcla - Roberto Sanchez
- Mezcla, Organo - Ron Taylor
- Mezcla - Rouble Kapoor
- Featured Artist - Samo
- Primary Artist - Selena
- Featured Artist - Selena Gomez
- Composer - Selena Quintanilla
- Viola - Suzanna Giordano
- Mezcla - Tony Mardini
- Violin - Yi-Huan Zhao

== Charts ==
=== Album ===
==== Weekly charts ====
Chart (2012)	Peak position
Mexican Albums Chart	56
US Billboard Top Latin Albums	1
US Billboard Latin Pop Albums	1
US Billboard 200	135
US Billboard Comprehensive Albums	117

==== Year-end charts ====
Chart (2012)	Peak position
US Billboard Top Latin Albums	65
US Billboard Latin Pop Albums	19

=== Songs ===
Year	Single	Peak chart positions				
Year	Single	US Latin	US Latin Pop	US Tropical	US Mexican Digital	MEX
2012	"Amor Prohibido"	23	8	39	8	33
2012	"Bidi Bidi Bom Bom"	—	—	—	8	—
2012	"Fotos y Recuerdos"	—	—	—	13	—
2012	"Como la Flor"	—	—	—	25	—
2012	"Enamorada de Ti"	—	—	—	17	—

== Certifications ==
Region	Certification	Certified units/sales
United States (RIAA)	Gold (Latin)	30,000^{‡}
^{‡} Sales+streaming figures based on certification alone.

== See also ==
- List of number-one Billboard Latin Albums from the 2010s
- List of number-one Billboard Latin Pop Albums from the 2010s
