= Mass media in Visalia, California =

The Media of Visalia serves a large population in the Visalia, California area.

The major daily newspaper in the area is the Visalia Times-Delta. There are also a number of smaller regional newspapers, alternative weeklies and magazines, including the Valley Voice Newspaper. Many cities adjacent to Visalia also have their own daily newspapers whose coverage and availability overlaps into certain Visalia neighborhoods.

Visalia arts, culture and nightlife news is also covered by a number of local online guides.

== Television stations in Visalia ==
Visalia is in the Fresno media market and thus primarily receives Fresno-based stations.

Channel	Call Sign	Network	Digital subchannel	Digital Subchannel	Digital Subchannel	Owner
16	KHSC-LD	HSN	--	--	--	Cocola Broadcasting
18	KVPT	PBS	--	--	--	Valley Public Television
21	KFTV-DT	Univision	--	--	--	TelevisaUnivision
30	KFSN	ABC	--	--	--	The Walt Disney Company/ABC
32	KBNK-LD	America One	--	--	--	Cocola Broadcasting
33	KJEO-LD	Pursuit Channel/AMGTV	--	--	--	Cocola Broadcasting
39	KMSG-LD	MyNetworkTV/Azteca América	--	--	--	Cocola Broadcasting
43	KGMC	Jewelry Television/America One	--	--	--	Cocola Broadcasting
47	KGPE	CBS	--	--	--	Newport Television
49	KIFR	Independent	--	--	--	Roman Catholic Diocese of Fresno
51	KNSO	Telemundo	--	--	--	NBC Universal
53	KAIL	TCT	--	--	--	Tri-State Christian Television
59	KFRE-TV	The CW	--	--	--	New World TV Group
61	KTFF-DT	UniMas	--	--	--	TelevisaUnivision
