= Enamorada de Ti (song) =

1990 song recorded by Selena

Song by Selena

from the album Ven Conmigo
- Language: Spanish
- Recorded: 1990
- Studio: Zaz Studios (San Antonio, TX)
- Genre: Freestyle, dance-pop
- Length: 4:05 (original version); 2:59 (remix version)
- Label: EMI Latin
- Songwriters: A.B. Quintanilla III, Pete Astudillo
- Producer: A.B. Quintanilla III

"Enamorada de Ti" (English: "In Love With You") is a song recorded by American Tejano recording artist Selena for her second studio album, Ven Conmigo (1990). The song was written by Selena y Los Dinos band member Pete Astudillo and her brother, A.B. Quintanilla III, and produced by Quintanilla. It is a Spanish-language adaptation of "Is It the Beat?", an English song originally written by Quintanilla III and Pamela Phillips Oland. The English version was recorded by Selena in 1989 for a potential English-language crossover album.

"Enamorada de Ti" falls under the freestyle genre, which was popular in the late 1980s. The recording was later remixed by Juan Magan for the eponymous album in 2012, a project led by Humberto Gatica. While the original song had moderate success in the early 1990s, it gained wider exposure through the remix album Enamorada de Ti. As a result, the song reached number 17 on the US Billboard Regional Mexican Digital Songs chart that year.

In 1997, a posthumously-released remix version of "Is It the Beat?" incorporated the rap verse from "Enamorada de Ti".

In the Spanish lyrics of "Enamorada de Ti," the protagonist expresses her inability to function normally in the absence of her love interest, emphasizing her deep love for him. On the other hand, the English lyrics focus on falling in love at first sight in a nightclub setting. Selena performed "Enamorada de Ti" during her Ven Conmigo Tour (1990–92) and at the 1990 Tejano Music Awards, where she received the Female Vocalist of the Year award. She also performed "Is It The Beat?" at least once, often as part of a medley with the Spanish version during the Ven Conmigo Tour.

Furthermore, during the first season of Telemundo's La Voz Kids, a Spanish-language version of the US singing competition The Voice, Xairexis Garcia performed "Enamorada de Ti".

== Background and development ==
Enamorada de Ti (duet with Juan Magan)
The remix version of "Enamorada de Ti" was transformed into a merengue duet with Juan Magan, with background trumpets, for the eponymous remix album.

In 1989, Selena signed with EMI Latin and released her self-titled debut album. During this period, her brother, A.B. Quintanilla III, took on the role of producer and songwriter for most of her songs. Prior to this, Selena had recorded three demo songs for a potential English crossover album, including "Is It The Beat?" which was written by Quintanilla III and Pamela Phillips Oland. However, she was informed that she was not yet prepared for an English debut. The demo for "Is It The Beat?" was later discovered on a cassette and released to fans in 2016.

According to Quintanilla III in the 20 Years of Music series, his father (and band manager) Abraham Quintanilla, Jr. originated the idea of recording a "hip-hop"-type song for Selena's second studio album, Ven Conmigo. He said that Quintanilla Jr was told by Jose Behar, president of EMI Latin, that several pop-music executive producers were going to attend an upcoming performance by Selena and her band. The idea was that Quintanilla III could write a song which could attract a crossover deal from EMI Records. Upon listening to the original recording of "Is It the Beat?", the decision was made to write and record a Spanish-language adaptation of the song, called "Enamorada de Ti", for Ven Conmigo. During the interview, Quintanilla III said that the writing for "Enamorada de Ti" began in an Albuquerque, New Mexico Motel 6 with fellow band members Pete Astudillo and keyboardist Ricky Vela. In the same interview Selena's sister (and drummer) Suzette Quintanilla called the recording a "Top 40 song" and "fun, that was definitely one of the fun songs on the album", with the recording "bringing out Selena's soul side".

The recording is a freestyle dance-pop song in common time at a tempo of 112 beats per minute. In the Spanish lyrics, the singer is saddened and bewildered by the departure of her love interest. She tells him how much she is in love with him, and cannot live without him. The English lyrics, meanwhile, speak of the singer falling in love at first sight with a mysterious man while dancing at a nightclub. The remix version featured on Enamorada de Ti (2012) is a merengue duet with Spanish singer Juan Magan.

At the 1990 Tejano Music Awards Selena performed "Enamorada de Ti" with three backup dancers, emulating dance moves popularized by Michael and Janet Jackson. She won the Tejano Music Award for Female Vocalist of The Year. During the first season of Telemundo's La Voz Kids, a Spanish-language version of the US singing competition show The Voice, Xairexis Garcia performed "Enamorada de Ti".

== Critical reception and legacy ==
Federico Martinez of La Prensa called "Enamorada de Ti" a "popular title track". In his review of the remix album Stephen Thomas Erlewine of AllMusic wrote that all its songs were "rooted in the '90s and sound that way", and altering the recordings to "update it" was unfeasible. Carlos Quintana, a Latin-music writer for About.com, called "Enamorada de Ti" one of the best tracks on the remix album. Enrique Lopetegui of the San Antonio Current called it a "crowd-pleasing" song with an "unbearable" merengue. Nilan Lovelace of Reporter Magazine Archives noted that although the original recording of "Enamorada de Ti" was a "slow tempo love song", the remix version had a "lively, tropical tone".

"Enamorada de Ti" has been featured on several compilation albums since its debut on Ven Conmigo in 1990. A club-mix version of the song was featured on All My Hits/Todos Mis Exitos Vol. 2 (2000), and the original version was added to La Leyenda (2010). "Is It the Beat?" was released posthumously on the soundtrack for Selena's biographical film and as a single to rhythmic contemporary radio and contemporary hit radio on June 3, 1997 and June 17, 1997 respectively; the soundtrack version included a rap verse taken directly from "Enamorada de Ti". The single also included two versions of "Enamorada de Ti": a Spanish radio edit and a Spanish club mix, as well as a Spanglish version which combined verses from both songs. In 2012, Humberto Gatica headed the production of Enamorada de Ti with the goal of rejuvenating several of Selena's songs in popular genres. Spanish singer Juan Magan remixed and sang a small part in "Enamorada de Ti" for the album. The recording peaked at number 17 on the US Billboard Regional Mexican Digital Songs chart that same year.

== Chart performance ==
| Chart (2012) | Peak position |
|---|---|
| U.S. Billboard Regional Mexican Digital Songs | 17 |

== Personnel ==
Credits from the album's liner notes:

- Selena – vocals
- Ricky Vela – keyboards
- Suzette Quintanilla – drums
- A.B. Quintanilla III – writer/producer
- Pete Astudillo - writer
- Juan Magan - remixed/producer/arranger (remix version)
