= Ya Ves =

Single by Selena

from the album Ven Conmigo
- Released: September 1990
- Studio: ZAZ Studios
- Genre: Tejano cumbia
- Length: 3:13
- Label: EMI Latin
- Songwriters: A. B. Quintanilla; Pete Astudillo
- Producer: A. B. Quintanilla

Selena singles chronology
"Mentiras" (1989)	"Ya Ves" (1990)	"Baila Esta Cumbia" (1990)

Live video
- "Ya Ves" on YouTube

"Ya Ves" ("You See") is a song recorded by American singer Selena on her second studio album Ven Conmigo. The song was written by A. B. Quintanilla and Pete Astudillo. "Ya Ves" was released as the lead single off Ven Conmigo in September 1990 and received critical acclaim from music critics, who recognized its significant contribution to the rise of Selena's popularity across the United States, Mexico, and Latin America. Following the unveiling of the United States Postal Service's commemorative Forever Stamps featuring Selena, "Ya Ves" debuted and peaked at number 20 on the US Billboard Regional Mexican Digital Song Sales chart in April 2011. In 2005, Bobby Pulido performed the song at the Selena ¡Vive! benefit concert.

== Background and composition ==
In 1989, newly formed EMI Latin signed Selena y Los Dinos, led by Selena, as a strategic maneuver to penetrate the burgeoning Tejano music market, which emerged as one of the fastest-growing genres in the United States. EMI Latin hesitated to let A. B. Quintanilla maintain his role as the group's producer. However, given the uncertainty of the genre's future, the company acquiesced, allowing A. B. to stay on as producer but cautioning that failure would result in his replacement by a company-approved candidate. After Selena's self-titled album surpassed the performance of other female Tejano artists' releases, A. B. secured his position.

Keyboardist, Ricky Vela, characterizes "Ya Ves" as an enthralling experience enriched by its captivating lyrics and melodious arrangement. He described the songwriting process between Pete Astudillo and A. B. as exciting, relishing the synergy between its lyrical composition and melodic allure.

== Reception ==
"Ya Ves" (1990)
"Ya Ves" received critical acclaim from music critics who recognized its significant contribution to the rise of Selena's popularity across the United States, Mexico, and Latin America.

"Ya Ves" was released as the lead single in September 1990 and debuted on indie Tejano singles chart at number seven. The song reached number one and remained atop for four consecutive weeks. (Note: Week of October 25, November 1, November 8, November 15.) In a survey conducted by Norteña Musical in December 1992, "Ya Ves" was the second most-played song on radio stations in Monterrey, Mexico, behind La Mafia's "Dile" (1990). Selena's performance of "Ya Ves" on the Johnny Canales Show was later included in the host's DVD compilation of "favorite songs", and her performance of the recording in April 1991 at Market Square was later included in Selena Live – A Night to Remember (2009). The singer performed the track at the 1992 Tejano Music Awards, while Adalberto and Gary Hobbs performed the outro of "Ya Ves" along with Selena at the event. Selena performed "Ya Ves" during her Houston Astrodome concert on February 26, 1995, cited as her final concert before she was shot and killed in March. In March 2005, "Ya Ves" ranked as the tenth most-requested Selena song on KSAB. Following the unveiling of the United States Postal Service's commemorative Forever Stamps featuring Selena, "Ya Ves" debuted and peaked at number 20 on the US Billboard Regional Mexican Digital Song Sales chart in April 2011.

Joey Guerra of the Houston Chronicle hailed "Ya Ves" as one of Selena's alluring rhythmic ballads for the dance floor. After a string of musicians covered songs by Selena at their RodeoHouston concerts, Guerra proposed that Luke Combs, slated for an upcoming performance at the venue, could interpret "Ya Ves" utilizing his "radio-ready twang". AllMusic handpicked "Ya Ves" as an exemplary track from the Ven Conmigo album. La Prensa's Liliana Torres del Castillo, lauded Selena's vocals on "Ya Ves" as being unparalleled and delightful while also praising the sensually romantic melody. Writing for La Prensa, Armando Barraza attributed the rise in Selena's popularity in the United States and her breakthrough in Monterrey to the impact of "Ya Ves", alongside "Baila Esta Cumbia" and "No Quiero Saber". Gilberto Coronel of El Debate, recognized the singles off of Ven Conmigo as being transformative in propelling Selena's burgeoning music career to new heights. This was echoed in El Heraldo de México, noting that the singles from Ven Conmigo significantly augmented Selena's success across Mexico and Latin America.

In 2005, Bobby Pulido received an invitation from the singer's father, Abraham Quintanilla, to perform "Ya Ves" at the all-star televised benefit concert Selena ¡Vive!. The concert took place in Houston in April to commemorate the tenth anniversary of Selena's death. Pulido recorded the song at Q-Productions, accompanied by Los Dinos, with a distinct tonal approach. Pulido eschewed any rehearsals, opting instead to acquire a copy of "Ya Ves" from Abraham, enabling him to intimately acquaint himself with the song. Pulido performed "Ya Ves" at the 7-Eleven Fest in Mexico City in July 2022.

== Chart performance ==
Weekly chart performance for "Ya Ves"
Chart (2011)	Peak position
US Regional Mexican Digital Song Sales (Billboard)	20

== Works cited ==
- Burr, Ramiro (1999). The Billboard Guide to Tejano and Regional Mexican Music. Billboard Books. ISBN 0-8230-7691-1.
- Patoski, Joe Nick (1996). Selena: Como La Flor. Little Brown and Company. ISBN 0-316-69378-2.
- "Selena y los Dinos – Ven Conmigo Album Reviews". AllMusic.
- "Record/radio hits > October 7, 1990". Austin American-Statesman. October 7, 1990. ProQuest 256110762.
- "Record/radio hits > October 25, 1990". Austin American-Statesman. October 25, 1990. ProQuest 256062717.
- "Record/radio hits > November 1, 1990". Austin American-Statesman. November 1, 1990. ProQuest 256094168.
- "Record/radio hits > November 8, 1990". Austin American-Statesman. November 8, 1990. ProQuest 256112928.
- "Record/radio hits > November 15, 1990". Austin American-Statesman. November 15, 1990. ProQuest 256079829.
- 1992 Tejano Music Awards (VHS). Texas Talent Musicians Association. 1992. San Antonio Convention Center.
- "Selena: La reina del tex-mex que murió a manos de su más grande fan". El Heraldo de México (in Spanish). March 30, 2020.
- Alford, Steven (February 5, 2015). "New Selena DVD showcases rare television performance footage". Corpus Christi Caller-Times. Archived from the original on March 4, 2016.
- Cobo, Leila (April 9, 2011). "En Breve" (PDF). Billboard. Vol. 123, no. 12.
- Corpus, Lorena (February 19, 2005). "Familia de Selena lo invita a homenaje". El Norte. ProQuest 311731404.
- Corpus, Lorena (July 11, 2022). "¡Elevan la música!". CE Noticias Financieras. ProQuest 2688415582.
- Coronel, Gilberto (April 16, 2023). "Hoy Selena Quintanilla estaría cumpliendo 52 años; así se vería en la actualidad". El Debate. ProQuest 2802290987.
- San-Juan, Rocio (December 1992). "Selena y Los Dinos: La Revelacion del '92". Norteña Musical (23).
- Guerra, Joey (March 27, 2005). "Her complete works / Collective recordings of Selena span a number of genres". Houston Chronicle. ProQuest 396118842.
- Guerra, Joey (February 27, 2019). "From Cardi to Kane to George: Which Selena song should each RodeoHouston performer cover?". Houston Chronicle.
- Barraza, Armando (March 30, 2008). "Selena Inolvidable". La Prensa. ProQuest 368670024.
- "Así fue el último concierto de Selena: la gloria en la antesala de la muerte". Infobae (in Spanish). May 5, 2021. Archived from the original on May 5, 2021.
- Hinojosa, Cassandra (March 31, 2005). "Born To Be A Star Selena known for her humility". Corpus Christi Caller-Times. ProQuest 2572333896.
- Torres del Castillo, Liliana (January 3, 1992). "Maria Conchita Alonso, Daniela Romo y 14 exitos". La Prensa. ProQuest 368659468.
- Quintanilla, Selena (2002). Selena (Media notes). A. B. Quintanilla (producer), Suzette Quintanilla (spoken liner notes producer). EMI Latin. 724354099403.
- Quintanilla, Selena (2002). Ven Conmigo (Media notes). A. B. Quintanilla (producer), Suzette Quintanilla (spoken liner notes producer). EMI Latin.
- Quintanilla, Selena (2009). Selena Live – A Night to Remember (Media notes). Abraham Quintanilla (producer). Q-Productions. QV-8007.
- Stacy, Lee (2002). Mexico and the United States. New York: Marshall Cavendish. ISBN 0-7614-7402-1.
- Peña, Manuel (2002). Música Tejana. Texas A&M University. ISBN 978-0-89096-888-8.
