= Como la Flor =

1992 single by Selena

Single by Selena

from the album Entre a Mi Mundo
- Released: June 1992
- Studio: AMEN
- Genre: Tejano cumbia
- Length: 3:02
- Label: EMI Latin
- Songwriters: A. B. Quintanilla; Pete Astudillo
- Producer: A. B. Quintanilla

Selena singles chronology
"La Carcacha" (1992)	"Como la Flor" (1992)	"¿Qué Creías?" (1992)

Music Video
- "Como la Flor" on YouTube

"Como la Flor" (English: "Like the Flower") is a song recorded by American singer Selena. Written by A. B. Quintanilla and Pete Astudillo, it was released as the second single from her third studio album Entre a Mi Mundo (1992). A family selling illuminated plastic flowers at a 1982 concert in Sacramento, California, inspired the recording. A decade later, A. B. was seized with an infectious melody and abruptly dashed out of the shower in a hotel room in Bryan, Texas, to recreate it on a keyboard with Astudillo. He completed the music in 20 minutes, while Astudillo took another hour to complete the lyrics. "Como la Flor" is an up-tempo, Tejano cumbia torch song that blends tropical cumbia rhythms with hints of reggae and pop music. Its lyrics describe the feelings of a female protagonist addressing her former lover, who abandoned her for another partner. The narrator is uncertain of her ability to love again, while at the same time, wishing her former partner and his new lover the best.

"Como la Flor" received widespread acclaim from music critics, who lauded Selena's powerful performance of the song's poignant lyrics about heartbreak and loss. The recording won Regional Mexican Song of the Year at the 1993 Premio Lo Nuestro awards. It was nominated for Single of the Year at the 1993 Tejano Music Awards but was removed in preliminaries; a move music critic Rene Cabrera criticized. The song peaked at number six on the US Billboard Hot Latin Songs chart and became one of the most-played songs on Latin music radio stations in Texas. After Selena's press tour in Monterrey, Mexico, organized by music executive José Behar, "Como la Flor" climbed to number three on Mexico's Grupera Songs chart, marking her first major commercial breakthrough in the country.

Following its inclusion in Selena's live set list, "Como la Flor" quickly gained popularity and became a staple in her concert repertoire, often serving as the opening or closing number. During her performances, Selena would oftentimes deliver the song in a slow, mournful tempo while performing a flamenco-inspired floreo hand gesture. As she transitioned to the upbeat section, she would exclaim "como me duele" ("how it hurts me") while beating her chest, imbuing the song with a powerful emotional resonance. Selena's stage presence, choreography, and nuanced delivery of the song's themes of heartbreak and resilience were hailed by music critics and scholars alike, who praised her ability to capture the essence of Latino mournfulness in her performances. "Como la Flor" was the closing number of Selena's final live performance in Bryan on March 19, 1995; she was shot to death by Yolanda Saldivar on March 31. The song has since been regarded as Selena's signature and "trademark", serving as both her posthumous epithet and swan song. Its popularity has placed it among her most celebrated works and cemented its position in the Texas musical canon.

"Como la Flor" became one of the most popular songs recorded by an artist of Mexican descent in the US. In 2018, Rolling Stone named "Como la Flor" one of the best Latin pop songs. Several artists have recorded cover versions of the song; these include Jackie Cruz, Ángela Aguilar, and Cristian Castro. Selena's performances of the recording were dramatized by Jennifer Lopez in the 1997 Warner Bros. biopic film and in 2020 by Christian Serratos in Netflix's Selena: The Series. The New York Times writer Joe Nick Patoski named his biography of Selena after the song. Contemporary reviews have been positive; essayist Ilan Stavans said the emergence of Latin pop in the United States in the 1990s is attributed to the popularity of "Como la Flor". Scholar Deborah Parédez lauded Selena for innovatively blending unexplored genres of African American music into the Tejano genre, which she believes led to the song's success. The Recording Industry Association of America (RIAA) has certified "Como la Flor" 9× Platinum (Latin). The song currently holds the Guinness World Record for the most video uploads of people lip syncing to a single song in one hour.

== Background and inspiration ==
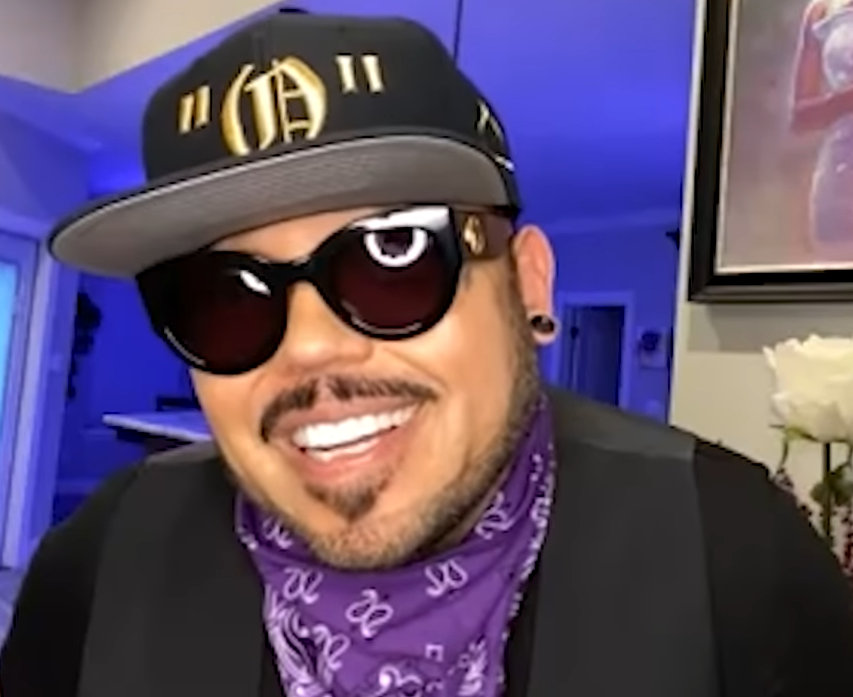
It took 10 years for A. B. Quintanilla (pictured) to write "Como la Flor", after conceptualizing the song in 1982.

Following the 1981 recession in Texas, former musician Abraham Quintanilla, sought to promote his children's band Selena y Los Dinos as a way to make ends meet after being evicted from their home. In 1982, Selena y Los Dinos, along with three other Mexican bands, performed at a nightclub in Sacramento, California. Following their performance, A. B. Quintanilla caught sight of a family vending illuminated plastic flowers. Struck by inspiration, A. B. conceived a repetitive rhythm and the working title "flor" ("flower"), though he found the term "plastic flower" lyrically unappealing. With the vision of someday crafting a song about a flower, he vowed to himself to turn his inspiration into a reality.

In 1992, after a live performance, the band spent the night at a hotel in Bryan, Texas before their scheduled travel to Houston the following day. While staying at the hotel, A. B. was seized by an irresistible melody that he could not silence. He sprang out of the shower, grabbed a keyboard, and started working on the tune with backup vocalist Pete Astudillo and keyboardist Joe Ojeda. A. B. had a ten-year-old concept for a song, and he shared it with Astudillo, who initially proposed a different idea based on his own life experience. Astudillo believed that the lyrics would resonate more deeply with audiences if they were based on genuine emotions. Despite this, A. B. remained committed to his vision of a song about someone receiving a wilting flower from their lover as an analogy for the end of a relationship. The two decided to write about a despondent woman who wished her former partner well rather than portraying someone better off without them. Astudillo linked the song to a Spanish-language version that predated Adele's 2012 single "Someone like You".

A. B. took 20 minutes to compose the music and another hour for Astudillo to complete the lyrics. According to keyboardist Ricky Vela, the song was finished in his absence while he was out for dinner. During the recording sessions, Selena left the studio before completing the backing vocals. A. B. lamented, "homegirl just bounced on me, she said, 'I'm out of here, I'm going to the mall." Nevertheless, he revised the melody and added the finishing touches by recording the backing vocals himself. Keyboardist Joe Ojeda also provided instrumental arrangement for "Como la Flor". A. B. developed a simple formula for writing songs like "Como la Flor", which emphasized melody lines, synth hooks, and basic instrumentation, believing that simplicity is "what sells". The recording took place at Manny Guerra's AMEN Studios.

== Music and lyrics ==
"Como la Flor" (1992)
Music critics and scholars praised Selena's emotional delivery, which helped convey the lyrics of heartache and loss.

Musically, "Como la Flor" is primarily a Tejano cumbia torch song, which American scholar Deborah Parédez described as a transnational fusion that melds tropical and cumbia rhythms with reggae and pop music. Tejano music journalist Ramiro Burr referred to the track as a "pop polka", that incorporates pop, disco, and R&B. Although "Como la Flor" is "equally catchy" as "La Carcacha", it is performed at a slower tempo. Mike Hazelwood of Tulare Advance - Register called "Como la Flor" an infectious Tejano recording that is appealing to a broad audience beyond its genre. The song is written in the key of B♭ major and composed in 4/4 time signature, with a moderate "lively tempo" of 92 beats per minute. Selena's vocals range from F_{3} to B♭_{4}, highlighting her "trademark cumbia rhythm." The melody of the song is simple yet melancholic, making it a "heart-wrenching ballad" according to Chris Pérez, the widower of Selena. Parédez also described it as a "captivating ballad", while Nathan Smith of Texas Music Magazine called it a "heartfelt, pop-tinged Tejano ballad." The call-and-response lyrics of the song's chorus invite audience participation. The bassline is described as "emphatic" and the beat is "irresistible" according to Christian Wallace of Texas Monthly. "Como la Flor" evokes "beauty and ephemerality", a connection that scholars Rosana Blanco-Cano and Rita E. Urquijo-Ruiz consider clichéd because of its title. Joey Guerra of the Houston Chronicle praised "Como la Flor" for its unique sound compared to other Spanish-language songs. It contains a danceable, synthesizer-based, pop-cumbia beat, and a banda keyboard sound. Selena "mixes pop vocalism" and displays a "boo-hooing cadence" that is consistent with ranchera songs. Writing for the San Antonio Express-News, Burr enjoyed the song's "memorable melodic hook" that he felt "had listeners whistling along". Soraya Nadia McDonald of The Washington Post called "Como la Flor" an "ear-wormy goodness" track.

In the lyrics of "Como la Flor", the protagonist directs her words to her former lover who has terminated their relationship. She expresses her desire for her ex-lover to find happiness in his new relationship, something that she was unable to provide. The protagonist uses the metaphor of a wilting flower to describe the end of their relationship, which she finds painful. Uncertain of her ability to love again, the narrator reveals that she gave all of her love to her former partner and wishes him and his new partner the best. The lyrics delve into the complexities of romantic relationships. Selena portrays a hopeless romantic who finds solace in being able to say that she had loved, even if it meant losing the relationship. According to Erika Ramirez of Billboard, Selena's performance of "Como la Flor" and "No Me Queda Más" (1994) was so passionate and devoted that it left listeners feeling either nostalgic or transported to a fantasy world. Pérez describes the lyrics as "aching", while Wallace finds them plaintive, bringing even "the toughest hombres" to tears. Peralta describes the lyrics as lovelorn, and a "clean pop [offering]" that echoes the works of Chelo Silva. Parédez characterizes the lyrics as self-abnegating after an unsuccessful relationship, in stark contrast to the themes of typical cumbia, salsa, and dance songs in Latin music; its lyrics more closely resemble those of pop music. According to Jessica Roiz of Billboard, "Como la Flor" teaches a life lesson about maturely ending a relationship and being the bigger person, wishing the new couple well. She finds the lyrics empowering and positive.

According to Parédez, "Como la Flor" exemplifies a pop-cumbia composition that caters to a broad range of Latino musical preferences. The song's themes of yearning and anguish are palpable, and the recording possesses a "residue of materiality". The song's melodic shifts successfully evoke Selena's presence in an elegy that marks her absence, providing a multi-layered "emotional register and communal sensibility". During Selena's emotional proclamations of unrequited love, "Como la Flor" exerts a "tensive pull" on the listener. Selena's "teardrop vocals" capture and convey what Roland Barthes referred to as "the grain of Selena's voice". "Como la Flor" furnishes "emotionally useful modalities" akin to Jill Dolan's "utopian performatives" or Josh Kun's "audiotopias". Blanco-Cano and Urquijo-Ruiz assert that "Como la Flor" is capable of measuring and directing "the affective labor of Latinidad". Pérez extols Selena's emotive vocal delivery, which elevated "Como la Flor" and found other performances of the song by other artists as lacking Selena's emotional delivery. Sertan Sanderson of Deutsche Welle asserts that the song can be appreciated even by non-Spanish speakers. "Como la Flor" was included in the posthumously released album Dreaming of You (1995), which was remixed by A. B who mixed the song to match the way the band would have performed it live. It diluted Selena's ethnic sound so that it would appeal to a wider mainstream audience, incorporating additional percussions to enhance the track's appeal, according to Burr in Billboard.

== Commercial and critical performance ==
Upon its radio release in June 1992, "Como la Flor" entered at number 36 on the US Billboard Hot Latin Songs chart for the week ending July 18, 1992. The song entered the top 10 on the Hot Latin Songs chart on September 19, 1992, rising to number nine. Rene Cabrera of the Corpus Christi Caller-Times called it "a giant leap", noting the dominance of Selena and other Tejano recording artists on Billboard's music charts. "Como la Flor" peaked at number six for the week ending October 24, 1992. Suzette Fernandez of Billboard stated that the song was Selena's first commercially successful single in the United States and that it had made a statement in her musical career. (Note: Selena's first commercially successful single in the United States is her version of "La Bamba", which peaked at number 19 on Billboard's Hot Latin Songs chart on the week ending August 8, 1987.) The success of "Como la Flor" boosted sales of its parent album, Entre a Mi Mundo, which replaced La Mafia's Ahora y Siempre at number one on the Regional Mexican Albums chart. "Como la Flor" was the most-played song on Tejano radio stations in Texas, according to a survey conducted by the Austin American-Statesman. The song was also one of the most-played tracks on radio stations in Houston, Dallas, and San Francisco. In Los Angeles, California, "Como la Flor" was the most-played song on Latin music radio stations for three weeks starting from October 13 through the week of October 29, 1992. (Note: For the week of October 13, October 21, and October 29, 1992.) The song finished 1992 as the 31st-best-performing song on the Hot Latin Songs chart while topping indie music charts in Texas.

In July 1992, EMI Latin president José Behar arranged a high-profile press tour for Selena in Monterrey, Mexico. The event attracted twice as many Mexican entertainment journalists as those from the US, highlighting the enormous potential of the Mexican music market, which was valued at US$267 million according to a 1992 market report. Selena was not commercially successful in Mexico; a music reporter from El Sol de Monterrey showed Mexicans did not accept Selena's music. At the time, the perception was that Tejanos were "hayseed pochos", a term that carries a derogatory connotation towards those of lower social class and racial background. Faced with Selena's limited Spanish proficiency, EMI Latin executives feared negative media coverage. However, the record company seized the opportunity to capitalize on the growing popularity of "¿Qué Creías?" (1992) and Entre a Mi Mundo, Selena's first recordings to gain traction in Mexico. Selena's approachable demeanor endeared her to the Mexican press, who hailed her as "an artist of the people", and she was booked for several concerts in the country. As a result of the tour, "Como la Flor" climbed to number five on Mexico's Grupera chart before peaking at number three on October 12, 1992. According to a music report by El Siglo de Torreón, "Como la Flor" was one of the most-played songs on Mexican radio stations in 1992 and early 1993, and the most popular "grupero" (group) song in Mexico City. The song's popularity helped Selena's commercial growth in Mexico, where it was regarded as "very popular". "Como la Flor" marked Selena's "breakthrough hit", earning her fame with Mexican audiences and paving the way for her first "international hit song".

At the Premio Lo Nuestro 1993 awards, "Como la Flor" won Regional Mexican Song of the Year. It was nominated for Single of the Year at the 1993 Tejano Music Awards. "Como la Flor" was dropped during preliminaries, which was considered a surprise according to music critic Rene Cabrera, who expected Selena to win the category. The track was nominated for Song of the Year at the 1993 Pura Vida Hispanic Awards, but lost to Emilio Navaira's "Como Le Haré". "Como la Flor" was recognized as one of the award-winning songs at the first BMI Latin Awards in 1994. Tom Whitehurst Jr of the Corpus Christi Caller-Times compared A. B.'s "famous songwriting" of the song to that of Jerry Jeff Walker's fame after writing "Mr. Bojangles" (1970). In 1993, the commercial success of "Como la Flor" led to A. B. being contracted with EMI Latin as one of their top songwriters, inking a deal worth $250,000 (1993 USD) in 1993. Following the murder of Selena on March 31, 1995, "Como la Flor" debuted and peaked at number nine on the Regional Mexican Songs chart for the week ending April 15, 1995. It was the most-requested song, along with "La Carcacha", on radio stations in Mexico following the announcement of her death. Elsewhere on Billboard, "Como la Flor" peaked at number three on the US Billboard TouchTunes Latin Songs chart, which ranks the top-selling social jukebox spins in the US, for the week ending December 14, 2002. "Como la Flor" peaked at number one on the US Regional Mexican Digital Song Sales chart following the 20th anniversary of Selena's death for the week ending April 18, 2015. The song peaked at number four on the Latin Digital Song Sales chart on the tracking week of December 16, 2020. As of March 31, 2020, "Como la Flor" has been streamed on Spotify 1.83 million times, and continues to receive airplay on Tejano music radio stations. The Recording Industry Association of America (RIAA) has certificated "Como la Flor" 9× Platinum (Latin), denoting 540,000 units consisting of sales and on-demand streaming in the US.

== Live performances and other versions ==
During Selena's live performances of "Como la Flor", she frequently incorporated a flamenco-inspired hand gesture called a floreo. She could be seen "turning her wrist in three backbonning [sic] waves, elbow to fingertips twisting in a serpentine motion, fingers elongated" as she "languorously croons" the title of the song. Selena's opening of "Como la Flor" was characterized by a languid, mournful cadenza, marked by a downtempo, seductive, and emotional delivery, where she would take several breaths before the song transitioned into an upbeat cumbia. The song's initial slow, emotive opening was reminiscent of the melancholic and booming voices of Mexican ranchera singers, who performed with a melodramatic flair. Selena's vocal performance was "achingly melodic", and according to Elijah Wald of The New York Times, she "[emphasized] the heartache of the lyric, slowly drawing out the lines about a lover leaving, her face contorted in pain". Selena's dramatic pauses were comparable to the flin styles of bolero singers Chavela Vargas and La Lupe.

During one performance, Selena was seen "smiling and even laughing" during a dramatic pause, which Wald said was Selena "reminding the audience they are all watching and enjoying this together" before her enunciation of agony and "beating her chest, murmuring the final words, como me duele ("how it hurts me"). When the song transitioned into an upbeat cumbia, Selena would sway her hips to the beat. According to Parédez, Selena's performances of the song provided audiences with "valedictory reverence, pleasurable engagement, and gestures of identification across the space of Selenidad". Parédez called Selena's performances of the song "ebullient" and equating to the "emotional register" of Latino mournfulness. Scholars Blanco-Cano and Urquijo-Ruiz agreed with Parédez's assertion, saying Selena's performance of "Como la Flor" exemplified "the emotional register and cultural codes of Latinidad". Wald noted Selena's repetitive acts on stage whenever she sang "Como la Flor", saying the performances still "feel authentic". Blanco-Cano and Urquijo-Ruiz said Selena's performances of "Como la Flor" matched the Latino expressions of longing and belonging, as well as grief and survival, noting her "easy charisma, choreographic virtuosity, [and] velvety voice" as evidence. "Como la Flor" is one of the most popular re-enactments of Selena by drag queens.

Following the growing popularity of the song, "Como la Flor" became a staple in Selena's set lists and she often opened or closed her concerts with it. According to Pérez, it was likely her favorite song to perform. However, A. B. had a differing opinion, citing Selena's annoyance at constantly playing the song at every concert. Selena expressed her frustration to A. B., stating, "I don't wanna play that song anymore, I am sick of singing [that song]". In response, A. B. argued that, just as concertgoers expect to hear "Billie Jean" at a Michael Jackson show, Selena's fans expect to hear "Como la Flor" at her concerts. On February 26, 1995, Selena closed her Houston Astrodome concert with "Como la Flor" to positive reviews; Jennifer Machin of Billboard lauded the performance as one of Selena's best, and the Corpus Christi Caller-Times' Natalie Contreras called it Selena's "finest rendition". According to Blanco-Cano and Urquijo-Ruiz, the song provided the audience with "the sounds of Latino desire [and witnessed] the improvised steps marking Latino loss". They noted that the song's placement as the closing number "underscores its special status" in Selena's repertoire. Selena's final performance of "Como la Flor" was on March 19, 1995, in Bryan, Texas, where A. B. and Astudillo wrote the song, it was her closing performance. In "Cumbia Medley", a live medley on the Selena movie soundtrack (1997), Selena performs the song in a "soothing, elongated tempo". In the San Antonio Express-News, Burr hailed the song as a "prime cut", finding it "electrifying and bursting with energy", and seeing it as a "crowning achievement" for Selena. The greatest hits album Ones (2002) includes "Con Tanto Amor Medley", a three-song medley that features a remix of "Como la Flor" with new arrangements by A. B. The track was created to fit an array of Latin music radio formats, with "Como la Flor" appealing to regional Mexican music radio stations with the addition of mariachi-style trumpets, as stated by Cobo writing for Billboard.

In 1996, Jennifer Peña performed "Como la Flor", which impressed music executives in attendance. "Como la Flor" was the closing song on the Broadway musical Selena Forever (2000), starring Veronica Vasquez as Selena, and in the Mexican musical Selena, El Musical (2006), which featured Lidia Ávila. The recording is also the closing song of Selena ¡VIVE! (2005). Olivia Tallet and Larry Rodarte of Mi Gente magazine called it the climax of the show. Other performances include David Archuleta at the 2010 Tejano Music Awards; and Becky G at the 2018 Fiesta de la Flor. Cover versions include American actress Jackie Cruz who received a positive reception from Billboard magazine; and Angela Aguilar on her EP homage to Selena in 2020. Country singer Kacey Musgraves received critical acclaim for her redention of "Como la Flor" at one of her concerts. Elia Esperanza's performance of "Como la Flor" during her audition on the eleventh season of The Voice debuted and peaked at number 21 on the Billboard Latin Digital Song Sales chart, while Selena's version re-entered the same chart at number 12. Esperanza wanted to perform "Como la Flor" to showcase her musical abilities. Adam Levine turned first, before Blake Shelton and Miley Cyrus did, with Levine thanking her for "being different". Cristian Castro's version, a duet with Selena that was created for Enamorada de Ti (2012), received mixed reviews from music critics. The duet debuted and peaked at number 25 on the Billboard Regional Mexican Digital Song Sales chart. Castro promoted the song at the 2012 Billboard Latin Music Awards. Jennifer Lopez, who played Selena in the 1997 biopic, performed a four-song medley at the 2015 Billboard Latin Music Awards that included "Como la Flor", gaining positive reviews. Aimee Garcia performed "Como la Flor" as part of her audition to play Selena in the biopic. English YouTube video producers the Kabs Family uploaded a video of their four-year-old daughter singing "Como la Flor", which went viral in March 2021. The staff of Billboard magazine described Kabs' singing as having "so much emotion". In 2006, Uruguayan-American YouTuber El Bananero released a parody of the song titled "Como una flor".

== Legacy and impact ==
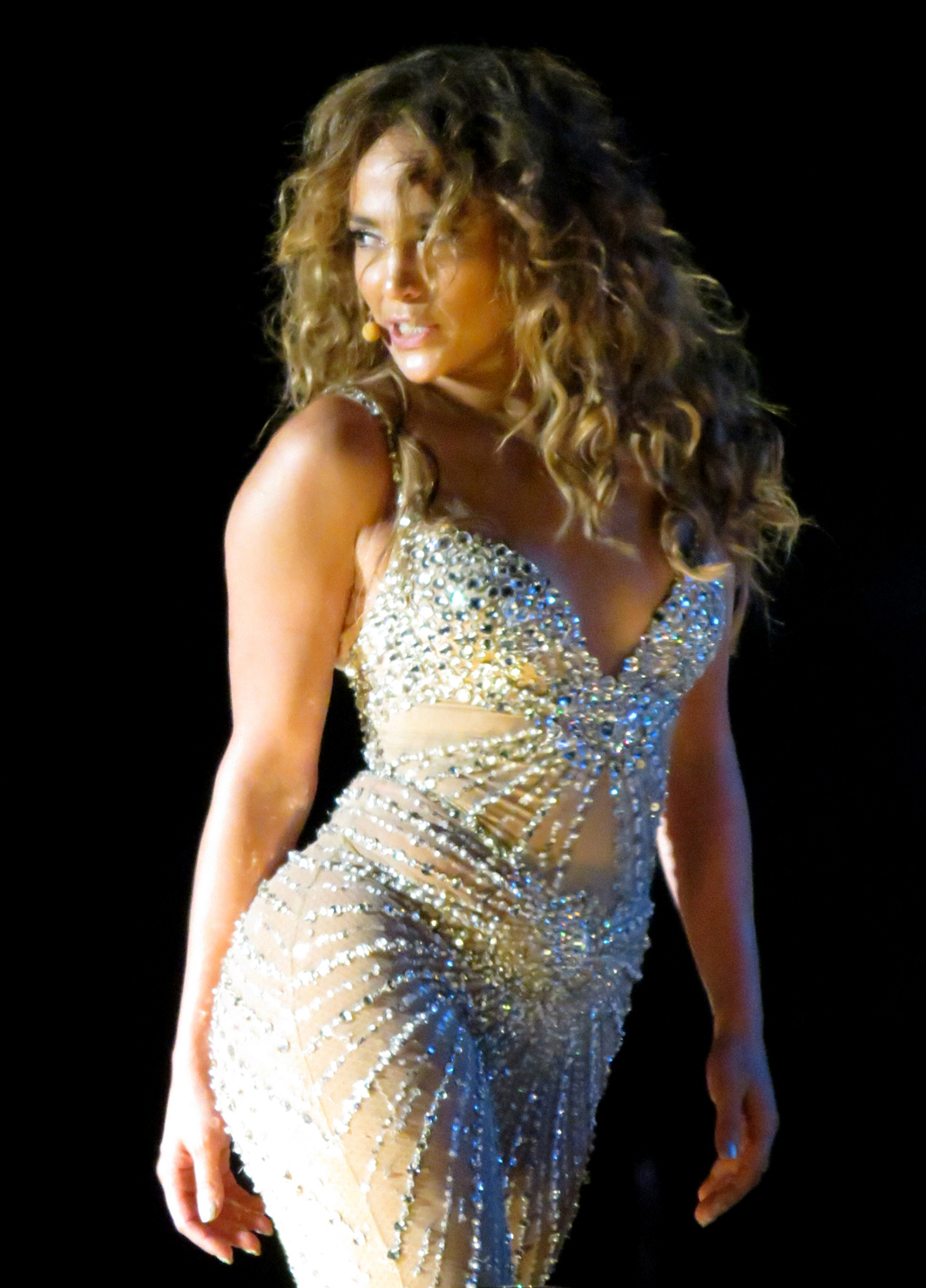
Jennifer Lopez (pictured) starred in the 1997 biopic film. Lopez's dramatization of Selena's live performances was considered a highlight of the film.

A. B. believed that "Como la Flor" was ahead of its time. When writing for Selena's album Amor Prohibido (1994), he said he found meeting expectations after the commercial success of Entre a Mi Mundo and "Como la Flor" challenging. A. B. encountered pressure from record executives in New York City and Nashville to create another hit song. However, he recognized that trying to surpass the success of "Como la Flor" was not feasible and instead chose to focus on writing a new hit.

Widely considered to be Selena's signature song and her "trademark", "Como la Flor" has become a posthumous epithet and swan song, as well as her most popular recording. The song has enjoyed international success, and is credited for Selena's domination of the Latin charts. It is one of her "most celebrated" songs and has become part of the Texas musical canon. "Como la Flor" became one of the most popular songs recorded by an artist of Mexican descent in the US. It became the singer's breakout recording that catapulted her to fame in Mexico and Latin America. According to a Santa Ana Orange County Register, "Como la Flor" is a Cinderella story that has lyrical parallels to Selena's life that "by the time she blossomed, her life was cut short". Cathy Ragland of the Austin American Statesman agreed, comparing "Como la Flor" to Selena as being "a metaphor for her life—a beautiful, delicate creature", as did Raul Reyes of USA Today. As Roiz points out, "Como la Flor", along with "Dreaming of You" (1995) and "Bidi Bidi Bom Bom" (1994), has "universal appeal". Burr also said "Como la Flor" and other recordings by Selena, has "instant appeal". The singer acknowledged that "Como la Flor" was her "very first big record and the one that started making things click [for her and the band]". Following the song's release, Selena's popularity skyrocketed. According to Parédez, "Como la Flor" resonated with Latinos. It established Selena in the Tejano music market, which previously dismissed her works. Along with "La Carcacha" and "Bidi Bidi Bom Bom", "Como la Flor" launched Selena's commercial Tejano career, and brought her fame in the Tejano, and Latin pop music markets. This was a surprise, according to Brian "Red" Moore who oversaw the production of Entre a Mi Mundo, because the group believed "La Carcacha" would have been the most successful song off the album.

According to Music executive Cameron Randle of Arista Records, the use of cumbia music in "Como la Flor" served as a "musical passport" for Selena, opening up opportunities for her. The Tejano cumbia style is characterized by a simple, accordion-driven, conjunto style of cumbia music. Selena innovated and transculturated Tejano cumbia by introducing ska, reggae, hip-hop, and funk into her repertoire. The incorporation of African-American music into Tejano cumbia allowed Selena to explore the cultural similarities between Mexican-Americans and African-Americans, exploiting this previously under-explored territory. According to essayist Ilan Stavans, "Como la Flor" along with "Baila Esta Cumbia" (1990) and "Bidi Bidi Bom Bom", helped bridge Tejano music and Latin pop, bringing Tejano music into the public consciousness and paving the way for Latin pop. Leila Cobo described "Como la Flor" and "La Carcacha" as examples of Selena's best work. Throughout the 1990s, the songs were played constantly at parties in Latino communities in the US and Mexico. By blending her Mexican-American roots with her American heritage, Selena was able to "conquer Mexico" in the 1990s with songs such as "Como la Flor" and "La Carcahca". In recognition of its cultural significance, "Como la Flor" has been considered a possible contender for the official Texas state song. Atlanta Journal-Constitution writers Shane Harrison, Nick Marino, and Sonia Murray selected "Como la Flor" as one of Texas' contributions to popular music.

In 1996, Joe Nick Patoski, a writer for The New York Times published an acclaimed biography of Selena titled Selena: Como la Flor, which literary critics lauded as "the most insightful portrayal [of Selena]". The city of Corpus Christi erected a life-size, bronze statue called Mirador de la Flor; years after its inception, the city erected speakers that play "Como la Flor" above the statue. The 1997 Warner Bros. film Selena, starring Jennifer Lopez in the title role, features a scene in which Selena manages a rowdy crowd at a fair by performing a downtempo rendition of "Como la Flor". Lopez's portrayal captures Selena's live performances of the song, as she gradually sings the chorus, savoring each phrase before pulling away the microphone on the final line and dramatically pausing to "cast[s] her performative spell". Billboard named this scene one of the film's top-eight moments. In an interview with the BBC, director Gregory Nava stated that people in Europe would have been singing along to "Como la Flor" had Selena lived longer. Selena Etc., Selena's boutique and beauty salon, released a perfume bottle bearing the name of the song in April 1997, featuring scents selected by Selena prior to her death. In 2002, the track ranked fifth on the poll for the best all-time Spanish song in the United States by Univision. Music critic Roiz hailed "Como la Flor" as a "must-have" on anyone's playlist, while the 2016 Selena collection from MAC Cosmetics includes a lipstick named after the song. Suzette Quintanilla, Selena's sister, remarked that the lipstick is a "beautiful red-tone color, a signature color that my sister would wear when performing onstage". The influence of "Como la Flor" extends to other artists, with Greg Gonzalez, singer-songwriter of Cigarettes After Sex, citing the song as an inspiration for "Kiss It Off Me" (2019). Furthermore, it inspired Gonzalez to write "Tejano Blue" (2024) and was released as an attempt to combine the sound of "Como la Flor" and Scottish rock band Cocteau Twins. More recently, in December 2020, to promote its streaming video series Selena: The Series with Christian Serratos as the title role, Netflix asked people to upload videos of themselves lip-syncing to "Como la Flor" with the hashtag "TodosComoLaFlor". Participants began uploading their videos on TikTok, reaching 250 videos per hour, a Guinness World Record. The song was used in the second season of the HBO television drama Euphoria (2021).

In 2026, Selena's estate granted fellow Texan artist Beyoncé permission to create a duet ("Irreemplazable (Como la Flor)") from the instrumental and verses of the song for the 20th Anniversary re-release of her second solo studio album B'Day. In a press release from her team, Beyoncé credited Selena with inspiration for her 2007 Spanish EP Irreemplazable after hearing her frequently on Houston radio (as well as a storied meeting at Houston Galleria) in her adolescence.

Critics' best-of lists
Publication	List	Rank	Ref.
Rolling Stone	50 Greatest Latin Pop Songs	19	
Dallas Observer	20 Songs Every Texan Should Know	7	
Atlanta Journal-Constitution	Greatest Songs from the South (Texas)	Placed	
Insider Inc.	100 of the Best Songs of the '90s	Placed	

== Credits and personnel ==
Credits are adapted from the liner notes of Entre a Mi Mundo.

- Selena – lead vocals
- A.B. Quintanilla – producer, songwriter, mixing, programming, background vocals
- Pete Astudillo – songwriter
- Ricky Vela – keyboard
- Joe Ojeda – keyboard
- Chris Perez – guitar
- Brian "Red" Moore – music engineer

== Charts and certifications ==
=== Weekly charts ===
1992–93 weekly chart positions for "Como la Flor"
Chart (1992–93)	Peak position
US Hot Latin Songs (Billboard)	6
US Regional Mexican Songs (Billboard)	9
Mexico Grupera Songs (El Siglo de Torreón)	3

2009 weekly chart positions for "Como la Flor"
Chart (2009)	Peak position
Nicaragua Digital Song Sales (EFE)	2

2011 weekly chart positions for "Como la Flor"
Chart (2011)	Peak position
US Latin Streaming Songs (Billboard)	11

2016 weekly chart positions for "Como la Flor"
Chart (2016)	Peak position
Latin America Tropical Songs (Monitor Latino)	1

=== Year-end charts ===
Year-end chart positions for "Como la Flor"
Chart (1992)	Position
US Hot Latin Songs (Billboard)	31
Chart (2015)	Position
US Latin Digital Song Sales (Billboard)	47
Chart (2017)	Position
Latin America Tropical Songs (Monitor Latino)	59
Chart (2018)	Position
Latin America Tropical Songs (Monitor Latino)	50
US Regional Mexican Digital Song Sales (Billboard)	5
Chart (2019)	Position
Latin America Tropical Songs (Monitor Latino)	39
Chart (2020)	Position
Latin America Tropical Songs (Monitor Latino)	41
Chart (2021)	Position
US Latin Digital Song Sales (Billboard)	24
Latin America Tropical Songs (Monitor Latino)	20

=== Certifications ===
Certification for "Como la Flor"
Region	Certification	Certified units/sales
United States (RIAA)	9× Platinum (Latin)	540,000^{‡}
^{‡} Sales+streaming figures based on certification alone.

== Works cited ==
- "RIAA Gold & Platinum". RIAA.com. Archived from the original on August 21, 2016.
- "Latin Streaming Songs > May 4, 2013". Billboard. April 11, 2013 – via Billboard Pro.
- "Regional Mexican Songs > April 15, 1995". Billboard. January 2, 2013 – via Billboard Pro.
- Quintanilla, A. B.; Astudillo, Pete (June 15, 2009). "Selena "Como la Flor" Sheet Music - Download & Print". Musicnotes.
- "Hot Latin Songs > August 8, 1987". Billboard. August 8, 1987.
- "Hot Latin Songs > July 18, 1992" (PDF). Billboard. Vol. 104, no. 29. July 18, 1992. ISSN 0006-2510.
- "Hot Latin Songs > October 3, 1992" (PDF). Billboard. Vol. 104, no. 40. October 3, 1992. ISSN 0006-2510.
- "Hot Latin Songs > October 24, 1992" (PDF). Billboard. Vol. 104, no. 43. October 24, 1992. ISSN 0006-2510.
- "1992, The Year in Music" (PDF). Billboard. Vol. 104, no. 52. December 26, 1992. ISSN 0006-2510.
- "Top Tejano Singles". Austin American Statesman. September 2, 1992 – via Newspapers.com.
- "Discos Mas Populares > October 2, 1992". El Siglo de Torreón. October 2, 1992.
- "Listas Mas Populares en E.U." El Siglo de Torreón. October 13, 1992.
- "Listas Mas Populares en E.U." El Siglo de Torreón. October 21, 1992.
- "Listas Mas Populares en E.U." El Siglo de Torreón. October 29, 1992.
- "Nominations for Lo Nuestro Awards, 1993" (PDF). Billboard. Vol. 105, no. 11. March 13, 1993. ISSN 0006-2510.
- "Listas Mas Populares". El Informador. Vol. 76, no. 263. September 20, 1993. p. 52.
- "El Hit Parade de Esta Semana". El Informador. Vol. 76, no. 285. October 12, 1993. p. 44.
- "Listas Mas Populares". El Siglo de Torreón. March 2, 1993.
- "Dan a Conocer Selena y Los Dinos Sus Exitos". El Siglo de Torreón. September 28, 1993. "La agrupacion realiza actualmente una gria internacional y es probable que en breve se encuentre de nueva cuenta en Mexico, como en julio pasado que recorrio las zonas del centro y el Pacifico, para concluir en el Distrio Federal, para promocionar su mas reciente produccion, en la que recopila sus grandes exitos. (for second reference) Otros temas que se incluyen en el disco son "La carcacha" y "Baila esta cumbia", que junto con los ya citados, han llevado a los musicos a conquistar su primer disco de plainto y doble disco de oro por las altas ventas de u compact "Baila esta cumbia", produccion con la que el ano pasado dieron a conocer su original estilo en Mexico, durante su primera vista, donde han consolidado su popularidad."
- Waliszewski, Bob; Smithouser, Bob (1997). Chart Watch. Wheaton, Illinois: Tyndale House Publishers. ISBN 978-1-56179-628-1.
- "Los Premios Latinos de BMI" (PDF). Billboard. Vol. 106, no. 12. Nielsen Media. March 19, 1994. Archived (PDF) from the original on October 28, 2021.
- "Behind the scenes with AB Quintanilla". La Prensa. February 18, 1994. ProQuest 368510204.
- "Regional Mexican Songs > April 15, 1995" (PDF). Billboard. Vol. 107, no. 15. April 15, 1995. ISSN 0006-2510.
- "Selena". Santa Ana County Register. March 21, 1997 – via NewspaperArchive.com.
- "TouchTunes Latin Songs > December 14, 2002" (PDF). Billboard. Vol. 114, no. 51. December 14, 2002. ISSN 0006-2510.
- "Una Reina del Tex-Mex". Fort Worth Star-Telegram. September 15, 2005 – via Newspapers.com.
- "Éxitos discográficos americanos: Discos America". EFE News Services. March 27, 2009. ProQuest 433383070.
- "Latin Regional Digital Songs > 21 April 2012". Billboard.
- "Regional Mexican Digital Song Sales > April 18, 2015". Billboard.biz. April 18, 2015. Archived from the original on April 11, 2015.
- "Latin Digital Song Sales Year-end > 2015". Billboard. December 25, 2013.
- "Latin Digital Song Sales > 27 April 2016" (PDF). Billboard. Vol. 128, no. 17. April 27, 2016.
- "Juan Rivera, Sofía Reyes y Selena con las canciones que arden en USA". Monitor Latino. April 5, 2016.
- "Internacional Top 100 Tropical Songs > Year-end, 2017". Monitor Latino. November 30, 2017.
- "300; S.A. Tricentennial; People; Memorial honors Tejano Singer Selena; Corpus Christi remembers slain singer's life, legacy". San Antonio Express-News. March 31, 2018 – via Newsbank.com.
- "Becky G estará en la Fiesta de la Flor de Selena Quintanilla en Corpus Christi". The Dallas Morning News (in Spanish). April 10, 2018.
- "Internacional Top 100 Tropical Songs > Year-end, 2018". Monitor Latino. November 30, 2018.
- "Internacional Top 100 Tropical Songs > Year-end, 2019". Monitor Latino. November 30, 2019.
- "Internacional Top 100 Tropical Songs > Year-end, 2020". Monitor Latino. November 30, 2020.
- "Watch Adorable 4-Year-Old Surprise Her Dad by Singing Selena's 'Bidi Bidi Bom Bom'". Billboard. March 25, 2021.
- "Latin Digital Song Sales > Year-end, 2021". Billboard.com. December 25, 2013.
- "Internacional Top 100 Tropical Songs > Year-end, 2021". Monitor Latino. November 28, 2021.
- "Latin Digital Song Sales > Year-end 2021". Billboard.com. Archived from the original on November 21, 2009.
- "Latin Digital Song Sales > Year-end 2015". Billboard.com. Archived from the original on November 21, 2009.
- Aguilar, Justino (October 15, 2012). "Celebrating Mexican Music's Best Artists". Billboard.
- Blanco-Cano, Rosana; Urquijo-Ruiz, Rita E. (2011). Global Mexican cultural productions (1st ed.). Palgrave Macmillan. ISBN 978-0-230-37039-5.
- Burr, Ramiro (February 23, 1993). "Selena Poised for Pop Success". Austin American Statesman – via Newspapers.com.
- Burr, Ramiro (March 4, 1993). "KWEX.TV Tejano stars nominated for 'Pura Vida' awards". San Antonio Express-News – via Newsbank.
- Burr, Ramiro (April 1, 1995). "Selena - April 16, 1971 - March 31, 1995". San Antonio Express-News – via Newsbank.
- Burr, Ramiro (August 17, 1996). "Women Rise in Fore in Regional Mexican Music Scene". Billboard. Vol. 108, no. 33. p. 100.
- Burr, Ramiro (March 11, 1997). "'Selena' soundtrack haunting". San Antonio Express-News – via Newsbank.com.
- Burr, Ramiro (1999). The Billboard Guide to Tejano and Regional Mexican Music. Billboard Books. ISBN 0-8230-7691-1.
- Burr, Ramiro (March 25, 2000). "'Selena Forever' Premiere Should Boost Catalog Sales". Billboard. Vol. 112, no. 13. p. 88.
- Bustios, Pamela. "Selena Returns to Latin Pop Albums Chart With 'Selena: The Series Soundtrack'" (PDF). Billboard Pro.
- Cabrera, Rene (September 18, 1992). "Selena, La Mafia, Mazz Topping the Charts". Corpus Christi Caller-Times – via Newspapers.com.
- Cabrera, Rene (February 26, 1993). "Mazz, Navaira Top Tejano Award Nominees". Corpus Christi Caller-Times – via Newspapers.com.
- Cabrera, Rene (April 9, 1993). "Navaira Big Winner at Pure Vida Awards". Corpus Christi Caller-Times – via Newspapers.com.
- Cabrera, Rene (March 31, 1996). "Rising Tide of Tejano". Corpus Christi Caller-Times – via Newspapers.com.
- Cabrera, Omar (May 14, 2006). "'Revive' Selena en el Blanquita". Mural. Gale A145752265.
- Carrillo, Elvira (March 2006). "Un Ano Mas Sin Selena". Correo del Migrante (in Spanish). 1 (3). "Quien no ha bailado al ritmo de Como la Flor y La Carcacha. Canciones que en la decada de los noventas sonaban en la radio y todas las fiestas tanto de barrios latinos en estados unidos como en mexico entero, donde la fama de la cantante comenzaba a extebderse."
- Chirinos, Fanny S (March 27, 2005). "Selena Fans Flock to City". Corpus Christi Caller-Times – via Newspapers.com.
- Cobo, Leila (April 14, 2001). "Reviews & Previews". Billboard. Vol. 113, no. 15. p. 84.
- Cobo, Leila (September 14, 2002). "Vital Reissues". Billboard. Vol. 114, no. 37. p. 96.
- Cobo, Leila (October 19, 2002). "Reviews & Previews". Billboard. Vol. 114, no. 42. p. 100.
- Cobo, Leila (October 19, 2015). "Watch 'Orange Is the New Black' Star Jackie Cruz's 'Como La Flor' Music Video: Exclusive". Billboard.
- Contreras, Natalia E. (July 11, 2018). "Selena makes Rolling Stone's list of Top 50 Greatest Latin Pop Songs". Corpus Christi Caller-Times.
- Tony Dandrades (July 25, 2021). "Pete Astudillo Sus historias con Selena y Los Dinos". YouTube (Podcast). Event occurs at 18:26.
- Davis, Steve (June 1, 1997). "'Selena: Como la Flor' New SWTSU Exhibit". Seguin Gazette – via NewspaperArchive.com.
- Del Toro, Jesus (March 31, 2005). "Selena 10 Anos". Rumbo de San Antonio. "Lo mejor de Selena paso por las manos de Red. "Fue una sorpresa", recuerda Red. "Muchos pensaban que la que iba a pegar fuerte era "La Carcacha". Pero la cancion que toco el corazon de todos fue "Como la Flor". Esa cancion convirtio a Selena en la numero uno". Pero vendrian mas. "Todo el disco Amor Prohibido lo grabamos en dos semanas". "La primera noche hicimos las secuencias de las partes de teclados hasta las 4 am." Despues grabamos a los musicos y por ultimo, Selena grabo su parte en tiempo record: era maravillosa. El martes de la segunda semana me llama Abraham y me disc "Estare en San Antonio este fin de semana Puedes traerme una mezcla que pueda oir?" Entonces, terminamos todo, le llevamos la mezcla y el nos hacia sugerencias. Pero le encanto inmediatamente y yo me puse muy feliz." En plena entrevista entra Abraham al estudio. Al ver a Red, sonrie. "Red!", grita Abraham, abrazandolo. "El Rojo, El Colorado...A este tenemos que vestirlo de vikin go. Es un heroe."
- Deggans, Eric (July 21, 1995). "Latin Diva's Legacy Lives Through Music". Asbury Park Press – via Newspapers.com.
- Doeden, Matt (2017). American Latin Music: Rumba Rhythms, Bossa Nova, and the Salsa Sound. Lerner Publishing Group. ISBN 978-1-4677-0147-1.
- Dover, Wanz (January 29, 2018). "20 Songs Every Texan Should Know". Dallas Observer.
- Quintanilla, A. B. (March 31, 2017). "AB Quintanilla habló de planes que tenía Selena antes de morir" (Online Video). Suelta la Sopa (Video). Interviewed by Duval, Michel. Miami, Florida: Telemundo.
- Exposito, Suzy (July 9, 2018). "50 Greatest Latin Pop Songs". Rolling Stone.
- Fernandez, Suzette (March 26, 2020). "Selena's First U.S. Hit 'Como La Flor' Compares a Withering Flower With Losing Love: See English Lyrics". Billboard.
- Flores, Adolfo (April 13, 2015). "Selena's Brother Tells The Untold Story Behind 7 Of Her Biggest Hits". BuzzFeed News.
- Flores, Griselda (May 13, 2016). "MAC Gives Sneak Peek of Selena Quintanilla's Full Makeup Collection". Billboard.
- Flores, Griselda (March 23, 2020). "'Selena' at 23: Here Are the Top 8 Moments From the Biopic". Billboard.
- Garcia, James E. (March 22, 1996). "Nava says Selena was American original". Austin American-Statesman. Gale A67396010.
- Guerra, Joey (March 27, 2005). "Falling for Selena". Houston Chronicle. Zest Magazine.
- Guerra, Joey (April 2, 2012). "Selena's music revisited with Enamorada de Ti". San Antonio Express-News. Archived from the original on November 6, 2013.
- Guerra, Joey (November 1, 2017). "The stories behind Selena's legacy and biggest hits". Houston Chronicle.
- Guerra, Joey (March 31, 2020). "Streaming of you: Selena is still 'la reina' on Spotify". Houston Chronicle.
- Guerra, Joey (March 25, 2020). "Living with Selena, 25 years later". Houston Chronicle.
- Guerra, Joey (March 25, 2020). "Backstage with Selena: A fan recounts his memories of the Tejano singer". Houston Chronicle.
- Guerra, Joey (May 10, 2021). "Selena keyboardist Joe Ojeda releases debut single 'Dueña De Tu Cama'". Houston Chronicle.
- "Most videos of people lip syncing the same song uploaded to TikTok in one hour". Guinness World Records. December 3, 2020.
- Harrison, Shane; Marino, Nick; Murray, Sonia (October 2, 2005). "Deeper in the Heart of the South". The Atlanta Journal-Constitution. ProQuest 337268373.
- Hazelwood, Mike (March 31, 2005). "Selena's memory lives in local fans". Tulare Advance - Register. ProQuest 443052788.
- Herrera, Isabelia (March 26, 2022). "Selena: Amor Prohibido Album Review". Pitchfork.
- Hernandez, Mary (April 1, 1997). "Su voz 'inunda' las transmisiones". El Norte. Gale A128280959.
- Hewitt, Bill; Harmes, Joseph; Stewart, Bob (April 17, 1995). "Before Her Time". People Weekly. 43 (15): 138.
- Jackle, Jeanne (February 27, 1996). "'Nightbeat' taking a dive from top spot". San Antonio Express-News – via Newsbank.com.
- Lee, Luaine (October 20, 2002). "Chatting with Aimee Garcia, star of WB's 'Greetings from Tucson'". Tribune Content Agency. Gale A120054584.
- Madrigal, Jackie (February 7, 2003). "Juan Gabriel's 'No Tengo Dinero'" (PDF). Radio & Records.
- Maldonado, Vilma (April 6, 1997). "Selena Perfume a Hot Item". The Brownsville Herald – via NewspaperArchive.com.
- Macias, Rebeccah (January 28, 2022). "Selena fans took notice to 'Como La Flor' in HBO's 'Euphoria' Season 2". San Antonio Express-News.
- Machin, Jennifer (April 16, 2018). "Revisit Selena Quintanilla's Best Live Performances". Billboard.
- Martinez, Katynka Zazueta (2003). The 'Latin explosion,' media audiences, and the marketing of Latino panethnicity: 'Latina' magazine and the Latin Grammys in a post -Selena América (Thesis). ProQuest 305340730.
- Márquez, Herón (2001). Latin Sensations. Minneapolis: Lerner Publishing Group. ISBN 978-0-8225-4993-2.
- Malone, Bill C. (2003). Southern Music/American Music. Lexington, KY: University Press of Kentucky. ISBN 0-8131-2635-5.
- McDonald, Soraya Nadia (March 31, 2015). "Selena died 20 years ago today. Here's why we're still talking about her mark on American culture". The Washington Post. Gale A407784057.
- Mottola, Tommy (2016). A New America: How and Music Reshaped the Culture and Future of a Nation and Redefined My Life. Penguin Books. p. 105. ISBN 978-0451467782.
- Nicolaou, Elena (December 4, 2020). "The Lyrics to Selena's "Como La Flor" Are Bittersweet in the Wake of Her Legacy". Oprah.
- Parédez, Deborah (2009). Selenidad: Selena, Latinos, and the Performance of Memory. Duke University Press. ISBN 978-0-8223-9089-3.
- Patoski, Joe Nick (1996). Selena: Como La Flor. Boston: Little Brown and Company. ISBN 0-316-69378-2.
- Peralta, Eyder (March 27, 2005). "The Unintentional Feminist". Houston Chronicle. Zest Magazine.
- Pérez, Chris (2012). To Selena, with Love. Penguin Books. ISBN 978-1-101-58026-4.
- Perry, Kevin EG (October 18, 2019). "I hear: 'So, what's our song gonna be?' a lot". i. ProQuest 2306412230.
- Kelly, Tyler Damara (February 28, 2024). "Cigarettes After Sex announce their forthcoming album, X's". The Line of Best Fit. Archived from the original on February 28, 2024.
- Edward James Olmos (narrator), Jose Behar (executive producer), Abraham Quintanilla (executive producer), Claribel Cuevas (associate producer), Randal J. Edwards (associate producer), Ila von Hasperg (editor), Jeffrey Coulter (producer), Cecelia Miniucchi (director) (April 1, 1997). Selena Remembered (DVD, VHS) (Documentary) (in English and Spanish). Corpus Christi, Texas: EMI Latin Productions, Q-Productions. Event occurs at 20:40.
- Quintanilla, Selena (2002). Entre a Mi Mundo (Media notes). A.B. Quintanilla (producer), Suzette Quintanilla (spoken liner notes producer). EMI Latin.
- Quintanilla, Selena (2002). Dreaming of You (Media notes). A.B. Quintanilla (producer), Suzette Quintanilla (spoken liner notes producer). EMI Latin.
- A.B. Quintanilla (April 4, 2006). A.B. Quintanilla III Presents Kumbia Kings Live! (DVD). EMI Latin.
- Ragland, Kathy (March 24, 1996). "With Respect". Austin American Statesmen – via Newspapers.com.
- Ramirez, Erika (March 31, 2015). "Selena's Legacy: Remembering the Singer on the 20th Anniversary of Her Death". Billboard.
- Ramirez, Rauly (March 31, 2015). "Celebrating Selena on her 20th anniversary". Billboard. ISSN 0006-2510. Archived from the original on April 8, 2018.
- Ramirez, Sonia (December 17, 2020). "This radio station is playing all Selena, all the time". Chron.
- Renteria, Melissa (June 19, 2010). "Blowout set for Tejano Music Awards". San Antonio Express-News – via Newsbank.com.
- Reyes, Raul (April 1, 2005). "Selena returned me to my Mexican roots". USA Today. Gale A131111334.
- Roberts, John Storm (1998). The Latin Tinge (2nd ed.). Oxford University Press. ISBN 978-0-19-028384-1.
- Romero, Angie (May 1, 2015). "Selena Quintanilla's Family on Jennifer Lopez's Tribute at the Billboard Latin Music Awards: 'She Owned It'". Billboard.
- Roiz, Jessica (August 9, 2018). "Watch Selena Quintanilla's Top 7 TV Performances". Billboard.
- Roiz, Jessica (December 14, 2018). "23 Years Later, Selena's Legacy Shines on Billboard's 2018 Year-End Charts". Billboard.
- Roiz, Jessica (February 26, 2019). "Kacey Musgraves Covers Selena's 'Como La Flor' at RodeoHouston Show: Watch". Billboard.
- Roiz, Jessica (March 25, 2020). "Selena's Best Life Lessons in Her Lyrics: Staying Humble, Self-Worth & Living Life". Billboard.
- Roiz, Jessica (January 31, 2020). "Viva Friday Playlist: New Music by Carlos Rivera with Becky G and Pedro Capó, Angela Aguilar & More". Billboard.
- Rubi, Marco Antonio (March 2, 1993). "Hit Parade". El Siglo Terron.
- Ruiz, Olivia (May 2, 2012). "Billboard". The Fresno Bee – via Newspapers.com.
- Saldaña, Hector (August 31, 2012). "Music; It's back to his roots for A.B.". San Antonio Express-News – via Newsbank.com.
- Saldaña, Hector (February 22, 2022). "San Antonio record producer Manny Guerra helped define Tejano music, but he'd rather talk about something else". San Antonio Express-News – via Newsbank.com.
- Sanderson, Sertan. "Netflix honors Selena – and the German origins of Tejano". DW.COM.
- Seshan, Sandhya; Ortiz, Elvira (1999). Selena: A Biography. Scholastic. ISBN 978-0-439-05680-9.
- Stavans, Ilan (2014). Latin music : musicians, genres, and themes. Santa Barbara, California: Greenwood. ISBN 978-0-313-34395-7.
- Smith, Nathan (December 29, 2020). "Selena is Forever". Texas Music Magazine.
- Tallet, Olivia P.; Rodarte, Larry J. (April 2020). "Selena Vive". Mi Gente. 25 (4): 32.
- Tamayo, Martin (June 23, 2020). "Conoce las canciones mexicanas más famosas de la de la historia en los EU". El Sol de Sinaloa.
- Tarradell, Mario (March 16, 1997). "Selena's Power: Culture Fusion". The Dallas Morning News.
- Tarradell, Mario (March 23, 1997). "Movie Follows Life, Tragic Death of Selena". Colorado Springs Gazette – via NewspaperArchive.com.
- Upadhyaya, Kayla Kumari (September 27, 2016). "'The Voice': A Short & Sweet Night of Blind Auditions Keeps Things Moving Along". Billboard.
- Vargas, Alani (April 25, 2019). "100 of the best songs from the '90s". Insider Inc. ProQuest 2424085110.
- Quintanilla, A.B. (December 2, 2019). "What AB Quintanilla really thought about the iconic Selena purple outfit". California 93.9 FM (Interview). Interviewed by Angelica Vale. YouTube. Event occurs at 31:00.
- Villareal, Yvonne (December 6, 2020). "Christian Serratos Knows She's Not Selena". Stateside Record and Landmark – via Newspapers.com.
- Wald, Elijah (December 3, 2020). "Selena's Special Genius". The New York Times.
- Wallace, Christian (February 25, 2016). "Texas, My Texas, You Deserve a New State Song". Texas Monthly. Gale A445117357.
- Whitehurst, Tom Jr. (August 23, 2015). "The intersection of fact and truth". Corpus Christi Caller-Times. ProQuest 2581386848.
- "COMO UNA FLOR". ElBananero.com (in Spanish). April 26, 2009. Archived from the original on April 26, 2009.
