= Suzette Quintanilla =

American business executive (born 1967)

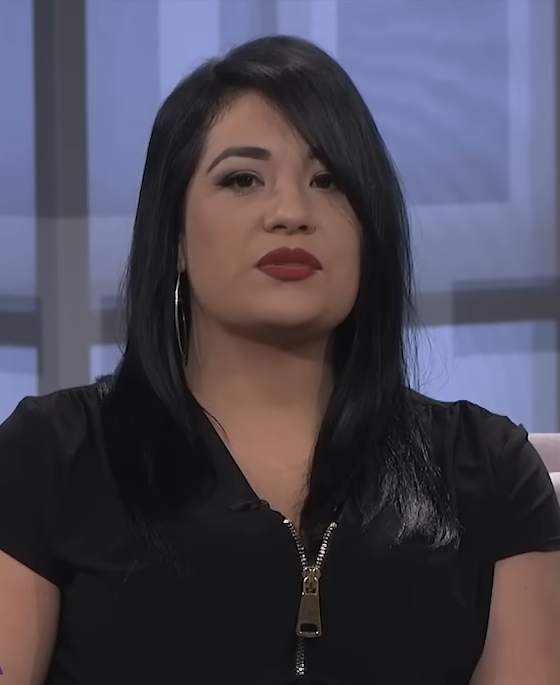
- Quintanilla in 2015

Background information
- Born: Suzette Michele Quintanilla; June 29, 1967 (age 59); Corpus Christi, Texas
- Genres: Tejano, cumbia
- Occupations: Drummer; fashion designer; product designer; museum director; A&R; music executive
- Instrument: Drums
- Years active: 1982–present
- Labels: Freddie Records, Manny Records, EMI Latin, Q-Productions
- Formerly of: Selena y Los Dinos
- Spouse: Guillermo "Bill" Arriaga (m. 1993)
- Website: q-productions.com

Suzette Michele Quintanilla-Arriaga (born June 29, 1967) is an American business executive who is the chief executive officer of Q-Productions. Quintanilla began her musical career as the drummer for Selena y Los Dinos, a Tejano band with her elder brother, A.B. Quintanilla, on bass guitar and her younger sister, Selena, as lead vocalist. In 1989, the group secured a recording contract with EMI Latin. After a series of critically-praised and commercially-successful albums, Selena crossed over into the English-language pop market. After Selena was murdered in 1995, Suzette retired from performing and focused on safeguarding Selena's image with her family. Suzette oversaw operations at the Selena Etc. boutiques and expanding the brand in department stores before the boutiques closed in 2009.

Suzette became chief executive of Q-Productions in May 2016 after her father, Abraham Quintanilla, stepped down. Suzette manages the Selena Museum and directs licensing for Selena-related ventures. Selena-themed T-shirts were introduced in retail outlets such as Forever 21, Hot Topic, Target and Urban Outfitters. Suzette collaborated with MAC Cosmetics on a Selena-inspired makeup collection. She was executive producer of Selena: The Series (2020–21) on Netflix, one of the platform's most-streamed TV series in the United States, Mexico, and parts of Central and South America. Her involvement with a Selena wax figure in Madame Tussauds Hollywood has also maintained Selena's visibility in popular culture.

Suzette remains active in the music industry; she has managed and promoted artists such as Jennifer Peña, Isabel Marie, and Los Tres Reyes. She was executive producer of the spoken liner notes for the 2002 reissues of Selena's albums and Momentos Intimos (2004), was a consultant for La Leyenda (2010), and contributed to the design and direction of Moonchild Mixes (2022). The Quintanilla family has been criticized by some fans and journalists for the commodification of Selena's image, particularly her posthumous releases.

Suzette has been on the board of the Selena Foundation, a nonprofit organization that supports students, school-retention programs, and has donated over $100,000 to hospitals, schools, food banks, shelters, and other causes since it began in September 1995. She has addressed student audiences and been a keynote speaker at fashion events and mother-daughter workshops. Quintanilla has promoted awareness among young girls of nutrition, physical activity, and mental health.

== Life and career ==
=== 1968-1982: Early life and music career ===
Suzette Michelle Quintanilla was born on June 29, 1967, in Corpus Christi, Texas, to Abraham Quintanilla, a retired Army musician and vocalist for the Chicano band Los Dinos, and Marcella Quintanilla (née Samora). She was the second of three children; her older brother, A.B. Quintanilla, was born in 1963, and her younger sister, Selena Quintanilla, in 1971. When Suzette was born, Abraham was active with Los Dinos; Bernal Records released their album Los Dinos a Go Go the following year. Los Dinos' popularity waned, prompting Abraham to prioritize economic stability over music. After several unsuccessful investments, he moved his family to Lake Jackson, Texas. Abraham adopted a more conventional lifestyle; he sang in his spare time. He began teaching A.B. bass guitar, prompting Selena to sing. After realizing that Selena could sing, Abraham recalled, "I saw the continuation of my dreams."

He formed a band with two of his children, A.B. on bass and Selena as lead vocalist, and a visiting cousin from Arizona on drums. Once their cousin left home, Suzette became the drummer. She was uncomfortable with drumming, considering it a traditionally-masculine role. The drum set Suzette inherited from her right-handed cousin required her to learn to play with a configuration opposite her dominant hand. She was taught by Abraham, A.B., and their cousin before his departure. Suzette did not use her wrists when drumming, which she felt held her and the band back. She struggled with confidence at first, noting that Selena and A.B. had intuitive ears, but music was not as easy for her; she eventually became more proficient. Selena persuaded Suzette to remain in the band and helped her overcome her shyness. Initially unenthusiastic, Abraham's children participated regularly in rehearsals and performances. Suzette was not secretive about her dislike for drumming. Abraham entertained relatives with the band, and the children eventually learned to enjoy playing.

According to Selena's biographer, Joe Nick Pastoski, Suzette "had a quick mind, a sharp wit, and the physical wherewithal to play drums". Abraham opened Papa Gayo's, a Tex-Mex restaurant with Selena and Company as entertainment, in summer 1980. When not performing, the children bussed tables. Abraham, wanting to return to the music industry, left his job to manage the venture full-time and occasionally joined the band as an additional guitarist. Frequented by her schoolmates and their families, Suzette continued to resist performing at the restaurant, and remained self-conscious.

A local disc jockey saw the group perform and told Abraham, whom he knew during his time with Los Dinos, that Selena had potential. Abraham said that he "[wouldn't] take her childhood away from her. I'm not going to push her." The 1980s oil bust caused a recession in the United States, and Papa Gayo's was closed by March 1981; Abraham filed for bankruptcy, and the family was evicted from their home. They moved from Lake Jackson back to Corpus Christi, where they lived with relatives. Abraham decided to promote the band, now called Selena y Los Dinos, and switched to Tejano music. The children vocally opposed playing Spanish music; they wanted to perform English-language pop songs. With their entry into Tejano music, Suzette became the only female drummer active within the genre.

=== 1983-1988: Selena y Los Dinos ===
In 1983, Selena y Los Dinos recorded their first singles on Freddie Records. The singles received little airplay and generated no sales. Freddie Records released the group's first cassette album, Selena y Los Dinos, the following year. The label provided negligible marketing support, considering the group a marginal investment compared to its more-established roster. Freddie executives dismissed Selena y Los Dinos as underdeveloped, advising Abraham to revisit the idea in six years and saying that they lacked immediate commercial viability. Abraham severed ties with Freddie Records and moved the band to Bob Grever's Cara Records, where they released The New Girl in Town (1985). Manny Guerra left Cara Records to establish G.P. Productions, dissolving the group's contract and bringing them onto his label in 1986. During this period, Selena y Los Dinos performed at private events, community fundraisers, local functions, and any venue with potential exposure. The rigorous schedule was socially isolating for Suzette, who noted that their only presence at school dances was as the entertainment.

Abraham sought performance opportunities for Selena y Los Dinos, lobbying promoters despite rejections rooted in gender bias and a preference for male acts. His efforts had little success; promoters eventually dismissed him as unreasonable and avoided him. Houston promoter Ruben Cubillos described Selena y Los Dinos as "kids making noise" and occasionally discordant, but acknowledged their drive and potential. Abraham faced widespread doubt about Selena's market appeal and the band's distinctiveness in a crowded regional scene; his advocacy gave him a reputation as difficult and emotionally volatile in industry circles. The group's earnings often covered travel expenses only. Abraham prioritized paying band members Ricky Vela and Roger Garcia before dividing the remaining funds among his children. Selena said about this period, "We wanted to make it, so we did everything we could". In 1985, Selena y Los Dinos performed on the Johnny Canales Show.

Their 1986 single, "Dame Un Beso", received considerable airplay and was Selena y Los Dinos' first commercially-successful single. The song was one of the most-played songs on Texas radio stations, ranking at number one in El Paso. Their album, Alpha, was moderately successful and enlarged the group's fan base. Selena's receipt of the Tejano Music Award for Female Entertainer of the Year surprised audiences for a 15-year-old dethroning genre frontwoman Laura Canales. Selena y Los Dinos was also nominated for the Most Promising Band award, making Selena the only female artist nominated outside the Female Vocalist category. Alpha was nominated for the Tejano Music Award for Album of the Year, and A.B. introduced a drum machine to support Suzette.

And the Winner Is... was released in April 1987, following Muñequito de Trapo that year. The album's title alludes to the band's recognition since their entrance into the music industry. And the Winner Is... included "La Bamba", a pop cover of Ritchie Valens' 1957 song, which was released as a single in summer 1987. Tim Baker of Newsweek called the track a "clubbified remix". "La Bamba", the album's most memorable track, was released in the wake of Miami Sound Machine's success. It entered the US Billboard Hot Latin Songs chart in August 1987, the group's first appearance on a music chart, and peaked at number 20. Selena y Los Dinos' version was released around the same time as Los Lobos' version, which appeared in the film La Bamba. Abraham noted that A.B. could not rival Hollywood, and the group's version began to fall on the chart as Los Lobos' rose; "we were an unknown group, they knocked us away," he later said.

Selena y Los Dinos released Preciosa and Dulce Amor in 1988, a turning point in their career; the band became one of Texas's most-requested Tejano groups on radio stations. At the 1989 Tejano Music Awards, after La Sombra's withdrawal, Rick Trevino invited Selena y Los Dinos to open the ceremony. The event drew industry executives, including scouts from CBS Records and the new EMI Latin. CBS made a higher financial offer, but EMI Latin president José Behar expressed a strong interest in signing the group. Abraham favored EMI's proposal, drawn by the label's promise of a future crossover with the mainstream market; the group rebranded as simply Selena.

=== 1989-1995: Band crew chief, Q-Productions and Selena's death ===
Production on the group's debut album began in June 1989, aiming to break into the international Latin market with plans for an English-language crossover. Selena's trendier, more experimental sound was the first collaboration with newcomers Pete Astudillo and Joe Ojeda. Suzette took over the group's marketing and managed their merchandise. She sold T-shirts, baseball caps, and beer-can coolers with the Selena y Los Dinos logo. In 1991, after attending a concert, Yolanda Saldívar asked Abraham for permission to start a fan club after finding no souvenirs of that night; he agreed, allowing her to run it from San Antonio. Suzette was the contact between Saldívar and the family; focused on merchandising, she welcomed Saldívar's involvement. They became friends, and Saldívar became part of the family.

Suzette told Abraham about Selena and Chris Pérez's relationship, which they had tried to hide from their parents. According to Pérez, Suzette had assured them that she would deny any knowledge if questioned. Abraham opposed the relationship and pressured Pérez to end it. Pérez later speculated that Suzette's disclosure may have stemmed from a disagreement between the sisters or a moment of tension. After the confrontation, A.B. and Suzette temporarily limited their communication with Pérez. When Abraham fired Pérez, Selena and Pérez eloped on April 2, 1992. Abraham later approached Pérez, offered an apology, accepted the marriage, and reinstated Pérez in the band. Abraham opened his recording studio and talent-management firm Q-Productions in late 1993, and Suzette marketed artists signed to the label.

Suzette became the group's crew chief, and began to shape the band's style and refine their visual presentation. She said that Selena y Los Dinos did not adhere to conventional Tejano music formulas; their sound emerged organically from their lived experiences. As a female-fronted group, they chose not to emulate prevailing norms. Suzette said they wanted to cultivate their own artistic identity rather than imitating others; if audiences enjoy what they are doing, "that's all you got to worry about." After Ven Conmigo (1990) became the first Tejano album by a woman to sell 50,000 copies, Entre a Mi Mundo (1992) was the group's breakthrough; Amor Prohibido (1994) became the best-selling Tejano album of all time, EMI Latin believed that Selena was ready to cross over. She signed with SBK Records to begin work on an English-language pop album, while Suzette and the band stepped back as pop producers took over. Suzette was uncertain about her ability to drum in a pop-music context. In January 1995, determined to improve her drumming skills, she hired a professional drummer to facilitate a transition from playing with her forearm to proper wrist use. She also wanted to learn to read music. Selena expressed reservations about the crossover album because her family would not be performing with her, but Suzette reassured her that they would be supporting her on the side. Suzette recalled that the family's role evolved as Selena began her transition into the English-language pop market; due to Abraham's fear of flying, Suzette was set to take over as Selena's manager.

On March 9, 1995, Saldívar attended a meeting with Suzette, Abraham, and Selena, during which she was confronted about discrepancies in financial records and missing funds from the fan club and Selena Etc. boutiques. Suzette's perception of Saldívar changed after she learned about prior complaints and the findings of Abraham's investigation. She regarded Saldívar as highly manipulative, exploiting access to information for personal gain. Frustrated by Saldívar's evasiveness about Abraham's questions, Suzette accused her of dishonesty and theft. Terri Langford of the Brazosport Facts characterized Suzette's conduct during the meeting as a verbal assault on Saldívar. Saldívar lured Selena to her hotel on March 31, 1995, where she shot and killed the singer. Suzette received a phone call from a mutual friend that morning that something had happened to Selena, and she should go to the hospital immediately. Suzette later said that she remembers nothing about what happened after that. She expressed personal responsibility for introducing Saldívar to Selena and feelings of betrayal, noting that Saldívar had become a friend and manipulated her way into their circle.

Media coverage of Selena and speculation about her death ranged from marginally credible assertions to hyperbolic, spurious claims. An individual falsely claiming to be the family's spokesperson began appearing in televised interviews. Media scrutiny and public reaction strengthened the family's resolve to safeguard Selena's image, as unauthorized projects proliferated and cultural differences fueled public and televised conflicts. The Quintanilla family pledged to preserve her legacy, promoting Selena in the media. On July 10, 1995, the Quintanilla family and Pérez signed a settlement agreement making Abraham executor of Selena's estate. Abraham said that Pérez and his children lacked his industry knowledge; without his leadership, the business would collapse. His statement prompted public and media criticism of him as overly controlling. Suzette refuted claims of being controlled by Abraham, asserting her independence.

=== 1995-2009: Selena Etc. and fashion business ===
Suzette and Pérez considered the future of the Selena Etc. boutiques after Selena's death, questioning the viability of both locations. Suzette initially hesitated to manage the stores, but ultimately agreed. Suzette and Pérez resolved to keep the stores open to honor Selena's vision; a vision that Suzette later shared. Her decision to manage the boutiques stemmed from devotion, and she believed that Selena would have done the same for her. Suzette retired from performing to expand the boutiques' reach. In an interview with Estylo, she said that her decision did not stem from relinquishing her aspirations, but from a diminished passion for performance after Selena's death. Suzette could not see herself performing without Selena, and had no desire to play in another band; as a part-owner of Selena y Los Dinos, she was unwilling to relinquish autonomy or take direction from someone else. She opened the Corpus Christi store on April 20 and the San Antonio store on May 16. Fans of the singer lined up hours before the stores opened. Suzette managed both locations, and was helped by her uncle, Isaac Quintanilla, who handled the relationships with suppliers.

The Selena Etc. boutiques became pilgrimage sites for fans. Their grief overwhelmed Suzette, leading her to work from home. She described the experience as chaotic and emotionally exhausting; she often wept in private after hearing fans' stories, and had a period of depression. Initially unprepared for retail, Suzette eventually found purpose in running the boutiques. She oversaw the completion of projects Selena had begun, including the publication of a winter 1995 fashion catalog with the singer's final designs. Suzette collaborated with Pérez to finalize a fragrance line which had been in development. After Selena's death, boutique sales increased. Suzette said that their efforts to protect Selena's image stemmed from a commitment to her legacy, not profit. Suzette, Abraham, and Isaac launched a clothing line in May 1996, which was inspired by Selena's design sketches with input from Sandra Gaona, who collaborated with Selena before her death. The collection had pre-orders from Spain, the United States, Ecuador, and Mexico. In February 1997, clothing manufacturer Jerell began developing a Selena-branded apparel and accessories line in a licensing deal with Suzette. The clothing line, designed by Suzette and Sandra Salcedo, debuted in New York showrooms that September.

Salcedo's designs were inspired by Selena's personal and evening wear, avoiding her signature spandex, rhinestones, and bustiers. Suzette believed that the line reflected Selena's vision: stylish, youthful, comfortable, and affordable. Aimed at young women, the collection included sportswear and received industry praise for Selena's cultural influence. The summer 1998 fashion line shipped to 50 Sears locations in Hispanic markets, later expanding to over 200 Sears and J.C. Penney stores nationwide. Focus groups liked the bright, upbeat designs and the inclusion of Selena's signature. Sales were strong in the first week, prompting a toll-free number to help customers locate the nearest Sears store carrying the collection. Salcedo described the collection as a modern take on retro 1960s and 1970s styles, with silhouettes and a cleaner palette. Suzette called the line "very hip, very sexy, [and] very fun", a sentiment echoed by consumers and the fashion industry. Roy Campbell of The Philadelphia Inquirer praised the collection for its vibrant junior trends and Selena's signature stretch fabrics. Doreen Rivera of Latina magazine noted the fashion industry's neglect of the Hispanic market, calling the Selena line an affirmation of its style and influence. Suzette did not see the collection as niche, saying that it had universal appeal. Strong early sales led Sears to expand the line to more stores and requested a children's collection. The summer 1998 line entered markets in Mexico and Puerto Rico, with the "Selena" label gaining international recognition and highlighting the Hispanic youth market. Initially projected to earn $5 million, the line had sales of $10 million in its first year. A portion of the proceeds supported the Selena Foundation, and the venture created jobs in Dallas. Salcedo and Suzette began work on the spring 1999 line in October 1998, completing designs by December.

Suzette developed her business acumen by managing the boutiques. She opened Moon Child, a standalone children's clothing store, in October 1999. Suzette extended the Moon Child and Selena fashion lines to Mervyn's and Sears, and contracted with the U.S. Army and Navy for distribution on military bases nationwide. She contributed beauty tips for Hispanic women in Latina Beauty (2001), a bilingual fashion book published by the editors of Latina magazine. Critics suggested that Suzette's continued involvement in projects related to Selena might be an attempt to capitalize on her sister's work, but she said she would not have continued the fashion line if she believed it was contrary to Selena's wishes.

Rose Ybarra of The Monitor believed that Suzette had a strong eye for fashion, shaped by her attention to detail and training in cosmetology. In 2002, production of the Selena line was discontinued as the boutiques shifted to selling non-Selena-branded clothing. Suzette said that the cessation was partly due to a stalled transition to Walmart, which disrupted plans for broader distribution. By March 2005, the Selena Etc. boutique began profiting after the closure of the San Antonio location, the salon section of the store, and a focus on women's and children's clothing. Latina magazine's Damarys Ocaná called the boutique "a trendy business" after its restructuring, though foot traffic at the remaining store was erratic. The San Antonio location closed because Suzette found managing it from her Corpus Christi office logistically challenging. The Corpus Christi store closed in June 2009, and the remaining memorabilia was moved to the Selena Museum.

=== 1996-present: Management at Q-Productions and Selena Museum ===
Following A.B. and Pérez's return to music, Suzette questioned her career. Abraham gradually mentored her in the business side of the music industry. Suzette began marketing Q-Productions artists, including Jennifer Peña, Isabel Marie, Los Tres Reyes and Jorge Roel y Potrillo. She selected the name and concept of Mariposa (1999), Peña's third studio album. She oversaw the styling, wardrobe, and merchandising of Q-Productions musicians, designing artwork and developing concepts for music videos. Suzette, dissatisfied with earlier art direction, took on the role with Abraham's encouragement.

Abraham informed Suzette about his intention to eventually step down from the business, and designated her as his successor. She had assumed leadership and management of Selena's image by March 2005, and oversaw marketing and merchandising initiatives related to the singer. In 1998, the Quintanilla family expanded Q-Productions and opened the Selena Museum; in 2019, it had 22,000 visitors. Suzette initially thought that opening a Selena museum was a good idea, but found the experience emotionally difficult and depressing. She said that visiting her office at the museum was emotionally challenging, since display cases of Selena's outfits surrounded her. Over time, however, her outlook changed as she saw the admiration of visitors to the museum. Their happiness gave her a new perspective, and she began engaging with visitors.

Suzette has dedicated her efforts to preserving Selena's legacy while also supporting and creating opportunities for emerging Latin American musicians. She was a consultant for La Leyenda, a multi-format CD commemorating the 15th anniversary of Selena's death. Released on March 9, 2010, by EMI Latin, the collection ranged from an affordable edition to an elaborate collector's set. Suzette said that the varied formats ensured accessibility for all fans. In addition to messages from Selena's family, band, and friends, she included fan messages in a commemorative booklet and emphasized that the project was intended to celebrate Selena's career rather than being a source of sorrow. Addressing criticism of Selena's posthumous releases, she said that many fail to recognize the family's responsibility to preserve Selena's legacy: "If we don't, who will?". Suzette refuted claims of financial exploitation, noting misconceptions about her father's earnings and emphasizing his role in their success. She said that critics assume that the family seeks to prevent others from profiting from Selena's name when their concern is in maintaining the integrity of the singer's memory. "To them, it's just a fast buck", but to the family, "it's about keeping Selena's image alive."

During the Great Recession, she acknowledged that Q-Productions felt the effects. Suzette said that the business continues to move forward, seeking new talent and working with music videos, artwork, and audio. Q-Productions' line of music DVDs had been distributed across Texas in major retailers such as H-E-B, Best Buy, and Walmart. Suzette was vice president of Q-Productions by March 2010, and was promoted to president and CEO in May 2016. Her transition to this leadership position was a period of renewed fulfillment. She oversees the company's operations, manages the Selena Museum, and directs licensing for Selena-related ventures. Suzette became selective about projects involving Selena, turning down offers that did not align with her family's values or her vision of how Selena should be represented; this included a collaboration with a major clothing brand for Selena underwear and socks. She declined, saying that before accepting any brand partnership, she asks herself if Selena would be happy with it. Suzette remains involved in the music industry, guiding the record label's mission to promote Tejano artists. She directed the music video for Las Fenix's "Cosquillitas" (2013) and contributed backing vocals to several tracks on their sixth studio album, Heliópolis (2013).

=== 1995-present: Preserving Selena's image ===
==== 1995-2009 ====
On August 29, 1995, the Quintanilla family announced the development of a biographical film directed by Gregory Nava. Warner Bros.' 1997 Selena, with Abraham executive producer, featured Jennifer Lopez in the title role and launched her career. Jackie Guerra, who played Suzette in the film, found it virtually impossible to accompany Suzette in South Texas without being mobbed by fans. According to Edward James Olmos, Suzette's home videos documenting her family's daily life on tour were instrumental in aiding in his role as Abraham. The videos provided insight into the family's dynamics and Abraham's demeanor, enriching Olmos's performance. Suzette recalled the family's initial reluctance to move forward with a Selena biopic, believing that it was too soon after her death. After being informed by their attorneys that Hollywood studios were developing unauthorized projects and faced with the possibility of losing control of their narrative, the family agreed to proceed. Despite intense criticism and accusations of capitalizing on Selena's death, Suzette said that if people understood their motives, they would see things differently.

Suzette testified during Saldívar's murder trial, which began on October 9, 1995. She contradicted Pérez's testimony about Saldívar's employment status on March 31. She spoke about her life and upbringing, as well as the March 9 meeting. Valdez felt that Suzette provided detailed information invaluable to the case. Saldívar was found guilty of first-degree murder and sentenced to life imprisonment. Since her incarceration, Saldívar has accused the Quintanilla family of loving Selena only for her money.

The first two years following Selena's death were challenging for Suzette, who credited her husband and her family with maintaining her emotional stability during that period. Suzette described the first two years as a blur, saying that she felt lost and had no memory of that period. She said that her focus was on trying to regain stability, describing the period as emotionally complex and disorienting.

Liza Ybarra played Suzette in the Broadway musical Selena Forever (2000), and selected the actress who played Selena in the Spanish-language version in Mexico. Suzette joined the board of directors for Laredo National Bank in June 2000. In 2002, she executive-produced spoken-word liner notes for EMI Latin's reissued studio albums by Selena. Suzette, her parents, and members of Selena y Los Dinos appeared live on Univision's Primer Impacto on March 31, 2004, to announce Selena ¡Vive!, an April 2005 benefit concert to commemorate the 10th anniversary of Selena's death. Suzette and Abraham collaborated on a lineup of artists to perform at the event, the first reunion performance of Los Dinos since Selena's death. She returned to the drums for the first time in a decade, joining A. B.'s Kumbia Kings performance that night. The broadcast was the most-watched Spanish-language program in U.S. television history. In March 2005, Suzette collaborated on the design of commemorative Selena cups sold at Circle K stores in partnership with Coca-Cola.

==== 2010-2019 ====
Suzette recorded her drum segment for A.B.'s "Nací para Sufrir" on his album, La Vida de un Genio (2010), after a desire to return to drumming. Suzette, A.B., and Abraham announced Fiesta de la Flor, an annual two-day festival in Corpus Christi. She stressed that the festival reflected cultural pride, celebrated family, and honored Selena's values. The 2015 and 2016 Fiesta de la Flor festivals drew 100,000 visitors and contributed an estimated $25 million to the local economy. Suzette was a judge for the Miss Chiquitita contest during the 2015 Cinco de Mayo Fiesta West Texas festival. On January 3, 2016, the Corpus Christi Caller-Times named her its Newsmaker of the Year in recognition of her contributions to the Fiesta de la Flor festival.

On July 16, 2015, MAC Cosmetics announced a multi-product collection inspired by Selena following fan petitions. Suzette contributed to the development and design of the collection. It was the most significant launch in the company's history, and became one of its most in-demand releases. The products sold out online in minutes, prompting fans to camp outside stores for hours before the line's in-store launch in October 2016. The products sold out within an hour at some locations. MAC began an online waitlist and announced plans to restock the collection, imposing purchase limits on the products. The restock was a rare exception for MAC Cosmetics, which usually does not restock limited-edition collections regardless of popularity. Daniela Herrera of People en Español attributed the collection's revival to the influence of Latina consumer power, which she thought played a role in persuading MAC Cosmetics to restock the collection. On February 26, 2020, MAC announced the release of a second installment of its Selena-inspired makeup collection and collaborated with Suzette on its design.

Suzette collaborated with sculptors on a wax figure of Selena for Madame Tussauds Hollywood, providing guidance via Skype while they worked on the mold in London. In April 2016, she contributed to the design of Corpus Christi's bus wraps for two RTA buses. On November 6, 2016, Suzette and designer David Melgar curated a fashion showcase with selections from Forever 21 and Urban Outfitters and branded Selena T-shirts for Fashion Week San Antonio. She brought T-shirts featuring Selena to retailers such as Forever 21, Hot Topic, Target, and Urban Outfitters.

After a January 2017 announcement that news anchor María Celeste Arrarás was developing a television series based on her 1997 book, Selena's Secret, Suzette denounced the project on Instagram. She called Arrarás disingenuous and said that the book was filled with fabrications, with its primary source the woman responsible for Selena's death. In March 2018, reusable Selena-themed bags with designs by Suzette were sold at H-E-B stores. Some proceeds benefited the Selena Foundation and the Boys & Girls Clubs of America, selling out within hours. In April, Stripes stores launched a limited-edition line of Selena commemorative collectible cups across Texas and Louisiana. Suzette collaborated on the design, and some proceeds supported the Selena Foundation. Stripes released three new designs by Suzette in February 2019, and two new designs by her in February 2020.

Netflix announced the development of Selena: The Series, a biographical limited drama created in collaboration with the Quintanilla family, on December 12, 2018. The series was executive-produced by Suzette and Abraham and its writer, Moisés Zamora, Jaime Davila, Rico Martinez, and Simran A. Singh. Suzette met Noemi Gonzalez, who was cast to play her, but was not allowed on set due to the COVID-19 pandemic. She and Abraham were sued for $1 million by Moctesuma Esparza, producer of the Selena (1997) film. Esparza believed that the Netflix series violated a 1995 contract he signed with Abraham, giving him exclusive rights to Selena's story. The series ranked number one on Netflix in the United States, Mexico, and throughout Central and South America. Critics and fans felt that Selena: The Series sidelined its main character, instead focusing on the Quintanilla patriarchs, and fans criticized Serratos's casting. Suzette asked Serratos if she had anticipated controversy about her casting as Selena. Serratos said yes, noting that her husband questioned whether she should accept the role. Despite the potential backlash, Suzette admired Serratos's willingness to take on the challenge and called her a "fierce Latina". In response to criticism after the series' release, Suzette said that she would never apologize for decisions she made with her family about representing Selena's legacy.

==== 2020–present ====
In February 2020, the Fiesta de la Flor was canceled due to a financial disagreement with the Corpus Christi Convention and Visitors Bureau. Suzette announced plans for Selena XXV, a tribute concert scheduled at the Alamodome that would have been broadcast on Univision on May 9, 2020. The concert was canceled due to the COVID-19 pandemic. On September 4, 2020, Pérez alleged on social media that the Quintanilla family was attempting to erase him from Selena's legacy. Suzette posted videos on Instagram refuting his claim, calling it unfounded and saying that Pérez remained an acknowledged part of Selena's story. A video filmed in the Selena Museum included Suzette indicating that photos of Pérez with Selena and the band remained on display, unaltered, reinforcing his presence in Selena's legacy.

On December 1, 2021, Bumpboxx collaborated with Suzette to launch a Selena-themed bluetooth boombox. She contributed to the visual design and artistic direction of Moonchild Mixes (2022), an album of 1980s Selena recordings. A.B. adjusted Selena's vocals, deepening her voice to make her sound older than she was in the original recordings. The album was the first project in which A.B., Abraham, and Suzette participated since the 2004 release of Momentos Intimos. Critics and fans questioned its ethics and authenticity. Journalists from NPR, Rolling Stone, and the Los Angeles Times expressed discomfort with the digital recreation, calling it potentially exploitative and artificial. Joe Bennett, a forensic musicologist and professor at Berklee College of Music, said that digitally aging Selena's voice is a relatively simple process using isolated recordings and software. Fans and critics accused the Quintanilla family of exploiting Selena's name for profit in Moonchild Mixes. On Good Morning America, Suzette dismissed the criticism: "What critics? We don't care about them." She said that the family would continue to make decisions regarding their music, their sister, and their band on their terms, hoping the public would recognize that everything they do is with "love, care, and beauty." Moonchild Mixes was nominated for Latin Pop Album of the Year at the 2023 Billboard Latin Music Awards.

The documentary Selena y Los Dinos, premiered at the January 2025 Sundance Film Festival, with Suzette and A.B. as its executive producers. Directed by Isabel Castro, it included previously-unreleased VHS footage by Suzette. Selena y Los Dinos received a U.S. Documentary Special Jury Award for Archival Storytelling, and was screened at the South By Southwest Film Festival. On May 13, Netflix acquired the documentary. It premiered on November 17, and it included matriarch Marcela, who rarely gave interviews, according to the Associated Press. Suzette partnered with St. Jude Children's Research Hospital on April 23 to introduce a Selena-themed shirt, with proceeds benefiting families receiving care at the hospital. On December 13, Abraham died at the age of 86.

In early 2026, Suzette filed a lawsuit against Shein, alleging that the company infringes Selena's "trademarks and name, image and likeness" by selling items bearing Selena's face and logo. In September, Shein called Suzette's claim "legally baseless" after it said they removed flagged merchandise and imposed a filter that prevents shoppers from searching Selena on their app. Because the products are made by third parties, the company's lawyers believed Shein cannot be held responsible. According to Billboard magazine, they found Shein's response similar to Temu's arguments following similar lawsuits made to Temu by Twenty One Pilots and MF Doom.

In August 2026, A.B. announced via his Instagram page that there will be a lawsuit involving Suzette, including "facts and circumstances" involving their father. A.B. announced that the lawsuit came about after years of "accumulated situations, decisions and circumstances" that had been kept private "out of respect, out of loyalty, and above all, because it involved my own family". Following the Instagram post, Suzette and Marcela released a joint statement claiming that they were not privy to any lawsuit or able to locate it in public records. According to A.B., Suzette was notified electronically and via mail "to her fiduciary duties, that is, her legal obligations to act with loyalty, transparency and in the best interests of those she was responsible to". He claimed that Suzette "did not provide [requested materials such as] contracts, documentation and financial information." The Los Angeles Times was unable to locate any case filings related to Suzette. On September 2, Suzette called A.B.'s allegations against her, their mother, and their father false and refuted claims that she sold Selena's personal items for profit. In September, A.B. filed a lawsuit against Suzette, Q-Productions, Inc. (1995), and Q-Productions, Inc. (2025) for $1 million. In it, A.B. alleges that he is entitled to a quarter of the profits under an agreement the family signed in 1995. Earlier in the year, A.B. alleges that he was not compensated appropriately and that Suzette failed to provide financial documents to determine how much he is owed. In his statement, A.B. alleges that the discrepancies began in 2016.

== Philanthropy ==
Suzette was appointed to the board of the Selena Foundation, an organization providing financial support for students pursuing arts-related degrees at colleges and establishing initiatives encouraging children to stay in school, on September 13, 1995. The foundation donated over $100,000 to the Texas Children's Hospital, schools, and charities from 1995 to 2005, donating $25,000 to Corpus Christi's Coastal Bend Food Bank for South Texas families, and has expanded to include donations to elementary schools and shelters. Suzette helped launch Operation Safe Return, a partnership between the Selena Foundation and the Corpus Christi Police Department, which provides school supplies to needy students to encourage them to stay in school.

The Internal Revenue Service revoked the Selena Foundation's tax-exempt status on May 15, 2016, after the foundation failed to file a Form 990-series return or notice for three consecutive years. The foundation's status was previously revoked in May 2010, and reinstated in December 2011. Suzette attributed the lapse to a former accountant's filing error, and confirmed that a new CPA had taken over the foundation's financial responsibilities. A 2016 painting class attended by Suzette and Marcela encouraged the donation of paintings to the Selena Foundation, with proceeds donated to the Women's Shelter of South Texas.

During an April 2000 visit to Martin Middle School, Suzette spoke to students about the realities of running a business; her talk enabled teachers to emphasize the importance of mathematics and punctuality. She emceed an October 2002 fashion show at Del Mar College for the college's family-assistance and educational-outreach programs, and participated in a March 2010 Crockett Elementary School event to strengthen mother-daughter relationships.

Suzette participated in the November 2015 Latinitas' Healthy Chica Conference in Austin, Texas, an event empowering young girls with media engagement and education about nutrition, physical activity, and mental health, sharing insights from her journey toward a healthier lifestyle. She participated in La Femme Expo in El Paso, Texas, a March 11, 2023, event with fashion shows, beauty tutorials, shopping experiences, and refreshments. On September 25, 2024, Suzette appeared on behalf of the Selena Foundation at the unveiling of the Kendra Scott Yellow Library at West Oso Elementary School. During her visit, she emphasized the importance of educational resources and representation in books for children.

== Personal life ==
Suzette married Guillermo "Bill" David Arriaga on September 11, 1993, at the Corpus Christi Marriott Hotel. According to Patoski, he described Arriaga as handsome and square-jawed. After learning about Suzette's marriage to Arriaga, keyboardist of the group Ricky Vela, who kept his feelings for Suzette private, wrote about his emotions in response to her wedding. Vela kept the letter confidential until it materialized into "No Me Queda Más" (1994). It was given to Selena to record for her Amor Prohibido album. Abraham said that Selena sang with deep emotional intensity and was seen crying in the recording studio, aware of Vela's feelings for Suzette. This was dramatized in Selena: The Series, which Suzette executive-produced. Her son, Jován Arriaga, was born in March 1998. He graduated with honors from high school in 2017 and studied business administration at the University of Texas. Jován has maintained a low public profile and has become involved in the family business. Jován's wife gave birth to a son, Lincoln Arriaga, in January 2023.

Suzette has a bright, cheerful disposition with a calm, composed, and occasionally shy demeanor. According to Pérez, she is warm and has a subtle wit combined with an approachable, convivial presence. Observers have noted that she appears to have inherited her father's strong will and assertiveness; however, as she became more open, she revealed an empathetic, accessible nature. Suzette had liposuction in Monterrey during the mid-1990s. Adapting a lifestyle change to combat a family history of diabetes, Suzette participated in her first marathon in 2012 after losing weight. She denied rumors that she underwent gastric bypass surgery after losing 78 pounds (35 kg) and told People en Español about the challenges of her weight-loss journey and her happiness with the loss. People en Español named her one of the 50 most beautiful people in 2015.

Suzette's live performances received favorable reviews from music critics. Elizabeth Campbell of the Fort Worth Star-Telegram noted that her energetic drumming during a 1993 concert in Fort Worth, Texas, kept the audience engaged. In an August 1994 concert review, Rick Mitchell of the Houston Chronicle described her drumming on "Bidi Bidi Bom Bom" (1994) as a "funky foundation" that anchored the performance.

After Selena's death, Suzette found coping difficult and struggled to rebuild her career and life. A.B. noted that it was difficult to plan an outing with their parents, because they felt "that one of us is missing." Suzette earned a GED certificate in April 1999, motivated by Selena's advocacy of education and persistent encouragement of Suzette to pass the GED exams. Suzette began attending school part-time to study hairdressing, noting that it was something she had always wanted to pursue. She said that she felt ready to focus on a personal goal after dedicating years to preserving Selena's legacy. Suzette is a fan of Garth Brooks, and Sheila E.. Shawn Stockman called Suzette "a great, dope drummer". Suzette was raised with exposure to Jehovah's Witnesses, although Abraham said that the family was not formal members. In late 1995, they had begun studying the denomination, and by March 2020 they were practicing as Jehovah's Witnesses.

== Works cited ==
- Anon. (August 8, 1987). "Hot Latin Songs > August 8, 1987". Billboard.
- Anon. (September 12, 1993). "Weddings". Corpus Christi Caller-Times – via Newspapers.com.
- Anon. (September 23, 1993b). "Marriage Licenses". Corpus Christi Caller-Times – via Newspapers.com.
- Anon. (June 13, 1998). "Selena Lives On Through Line Of Clothes". The Santa Fe New Mexican – via Newspapers.com.
- Anon. (July 27, 1998b). "Brevitos". Corpus Christi Caller-Times – via Newspapers.com.
- Anon. (October 3, 1999b). "Business Journal > October 3, 1999". Corpus Christi Caller-Times – via Newspapers.com.
- Anon. (1999). "Sobreviviendo a Selena". Latina.
- Anon. (June 25, 2000). "Inside Society". Corpus Christi Caller-Times – via Newspapers.com.
- Anon. (October 4, 2002). "Around The Bend". Corpus Christi Caller-Times – via Newspapers.com.
- Anon. (November 26, 2008). "Selena: Biography". Biography. A&E.
- Anon. (March 29, 2010). "Day Out For Moms, Daughters". Corpus Christi Caller-Times – via Newspapers.com.
- Anon. (August 6, 2013). ""Las Fenix" de Texas promocionan su nuevo disco "Heliópolis"". EFE (in Spanish). ProQuest 1418002291.
- Anon. (April 24, 2015b). "Massive Crowds On Way To Fiesta West Texas". Odessa America – via Newspapers.com.
- Anon. (November 16, 2015). "Healthy Chica Conference Saturday". Austin American-Statesman – via Newspapers.com.
- Anon. (December 12, 2018). "Netflix Will Soon Have Series That Covers Life Story Of Selena". Corpus Christi Caller-Times – via Newspapers.com.
- Anon. (September 5, 2020). "Suzette Quintanilla, hermana de Selena, responde ante las acusaciones de Chris Pérez: La hermana de la fallecida cantante tacha de ridículos los argumentos del viudo de su hermana, y además lo desmiente con pruebas". El Diario La Prensa (in Spanish). ProQuest 2440317967.
- Anon. (March 19, 2022). "Album Features 13-Year-Old Selena". Star Tribune – via Newspapers.com.
- Aguila, Justino (March 31, 2025). "Still Dreaming Big, With Love". The Los Angeles Times – via Newspapers.com.
- Aguilar, Elvia (March 31, 2010). "Selena 15 Years After Her Death". Corpus Christi Caller-Times – via Newspapers.com.
- Ali, Lorraine (December 2, 2020). "Netflix's disappointing 'Selena: The Series' fails to give the singer a voice". Los Angeles Times.
- Almanza, Lucy (November 13, 2016). "FWSA celebrates Selena's legacy on the runway". La Prensa. ProQuest 1850067033.
- Arrarás, María Celeste (1997). Selena's Secret: The Revealing Story Behind Her Tragic Death. Simon and Schuster. ISBN 0-684-83193-7.
- Averyt, Libby (October 15, 1995). "Valdez vs. Tinker". Corpus Christi Caller-Times – via Newspapers.com.
- Baker, Tim (2018). "The Life and Legacy of Tejano's Queen". Newsweek (100).
- Barrientos, Selena (February 16, 2024). "Where Are Selena Quintanilla's Siblings Now? A Look at A.B. and Suzette's Lives After Her Death". Yahoo.com.
- Bisantz, Kate; Bisantz, Max (2018). Who Was...Selena?. Penguin Books. ISBN 978-1101995501.
- Burns, Ashlee (February 26, 2020). "MAC Cosmetics Announces New Selena Collection". Corpus Christi Caller-Times – via Newspapers.com.
- Burr, Ramiro (March 25, 2000). "'Selena Forever' Premiere Should Boost Catalog Sales". Billboard. Vol. 112, no. 13.
- Bruns, Roger (2008). Icons of Latino America: Latino contributions to American culture. Greenwood Press. ISBN 9781573567961.
- Berman, Judy (December 2, 2020). "Who Was Selena? Netflix's New Series Doesn't Have a Clue". Time.
- Bernstein, Ellen (July 26, 1997). "Dallas Company To Product 'Hot, Hip' Selena Clothing Line". Corpus Christi Caller-Times – via Newspapers.com.
- Bernstein, Ellen (August 31, 1998). "Sears Triples Number of Stores Carrying Selena Sportswear". Corpus Christi Caller-Times – via Newspapers.com.
- Beshur, Alison (March 31, 2004). "Selena: Nine Years After Her Death, 'Ones' CD Sells 400,000, New Album Hits Store". Corpus Christi Caller-Times – via Newspapers.com.
- Cardwell, Cathy (September 1998). "Selena's Crossover Into Clothing". Hispanic Business. 20 (8).
- Cardwell, Cary (October 15, 1998b). "Another Crossover For Selena". The Los Angeles Times – via Newspapers.com.
- Caicedo, Harry (June 4, 1989). "First Album in the Works". The Monitor – via Newspapers.com.
- Carlos, Marjon (September 29, 2016). "The Enduring Style Influence of Selena". Vogue. Archived from the original on April 5, 2018.
- Cantu, Tony (March 14, 1997). "The Death That Launched A Thousand Shirts". The Albuquerque Tribune – via Newspapers.com.
- Campbell, Elizabeth (June 29, 1993). "Selena y Los Dinos Infect Tejano Rodeo With Dance Fever". Fort Worth Star-Telegram – via Newspapers.com.
- Campbell, Roy H. (December 20, 1998). "Realizing Selena's Dream". The Philadelphia Inquirer – via Newspapers.com.
- Chung, Christine (March 17, 2022). "Selena's Family Announces New Album, 27 Years After Her Death". The New York Times.
- Cobo, Leila (August 17, 2002b). "EMI Fuels Selena Legacy With Reissues". Billboard. Vol. 114, no. 33.
- Cobo, Leila (October 19, 2002). "Singles Review". Billboard. Vol. 114, no. 42. p. 20.
- Cobo, Leila (April 2005). "Selena: The Legend, 10 Years Later". Hispanic. Vol. 18, no. 4. Gale 237040338 – via Gale Research.
- Colloff, Pamela (April 2010). "Dreaming at of her". Texas Monthly. Vol. 38, no. 4. Gale A222555398 – via Gale Research.
- Contreras, Natalia (April 19, 2016). "Ride With A Local legacy". Corpus Christi Caller-Times – via Newspapers.com.
- Contreras, Natalia E. (October 28, 2016b). "IRS Woes Catch Selena Foundation". Corpus Christi Caller-Times – via Newspapers.com.
- Contreras, Natalia E. (January 27, 2017). "Suzette Quintanilla Arriaga Lashes Out At Upcoming Show On Selena". Corpus Christi Caller-Times – via Newspapers.com.
- Cordero, Rosy (December 6, 2020). "'Selena: The Series' creator answers burning questions, teases part 2 is 'rise of Selena the superstar'". Entertainment Weekly.
- Corpus, Lorena (September 18, 1995). "Preparan Los Dinos la 'Gira del Adios'". El Norte (in Spanish). ProQuest 316365442.
- Cortes Gonzalez, Maria (March 5, 2023). "Sister Of Late Tejano Queen Selena Quintanilla Coming To El Paso". El Paso Times – via Newspapers.com.
- Diaz, Thatiana (February 25, 2020). "MAC Cosmetics Is Launching A Second Selena Collection — & Her Sister Told Us All The Details". Refinery29.
- Díaz, Yolaine (February 2014). "Mas Fuerte Suzette Quintanilla" [Much Stronger Suzette Quintanilla]. People en Español (in Spanish). 17 (1). EBSCOhost 96310089.
- Ede-Osifo, Uwa (March 28, 2025). "Selena's Killer Yolanda Saldivar Is Up For Parole". Victoria Advocate – via Newspapers.com.
- Ehrlich, Allison (March 28, 2024). "Selena Etc". Corpus Christi Caller-Times – via Newspapers.com.
- Esparaza, Elia (March 2000). "When The Sun Shines in Corpus Christi". Estylo. 4 (2).
- Escobar, Naidy (September 26, 2024). "Unveiling of the Kendra Scott Yellow Library at West Oso Elementary School". KRIS-TV.
- Espinosa, Gastón (2008). Mexican American Religions: Spirituality, Activism, and Culture (1st ed.). Duke University Press. ISBN 9780822388951.
- Espinoza, Sonny Richard Ernest (2001). Chicanismo in Film and Popular Culture (Thesis). University of California, Los Angeles.
- Falcon, Meagan (August 22, 2019). "'Walking Dead' Star Serratos In Negotiations To Play Selena". Corpus Christi Caller-Times – via Newspapers.com.
- Falcon, Meagan (November 12, 2019b). "A First Look At Neftlix's 'Selena: The Series'". El Paso Times – via Newspapers.com.
- Falcon, Meagen (February 19, 2020b). "Tribute Concert For the Queen of Tejano Will Have Pitbull, Laser Lights, Surprises". Corpus Christi Caller-Times – via Newspapers.com.
- Falcon, Meagen (February 21, 2020c). "Stripes Cups Honor Selena's Legacy". Corpus Christi Caller-Times – via Newspapers.com.
- Falcon, Meagen (March 14, 2020). "Selena XXV Concert in SA to be Rescheduled". Corpus Christi Caller-Times – via Newspapers.com.
- Fletcher, Michael; Getz, Robert P.; Fletcher, Nathan; Morales, Joe (March 1999). "En Persona: Selena". En Persona (in Spanish and English). TC Network. Galavision. "Abraham Quintanilla: And when she sang it or recorded it she put all her soul to it. And that she had tears in her eyes, you know, her eyes were watery because she knew how Ricky (Vela) felt. Suzette Quintanilla: I guess "Si Una Vez" because I think Selena really liked to give that attitude in that song."
- Flores, Andrea (September 3, 2026). "Quintanilla siblings feud over alleged lawsuit: 'It comes from years'". Los Angeles Times.
- Garca, Diana (September 12, 2020). "Chris Pérez, viudo de Selena, hace fuerte confesión". The Salinas Californian (in Spanish). ProQuest 2441761680.
- Garcia, Ricky; Gamboa, Suzanne (March 15, 2022). "New digitally modified Selena music announcement gets mixed reviews online". KXAN-TV.
- Gamino, Denise (April 9, 2000). "Echoes Of Selena's Spirit". Waco Tribune-Herald – via Newspapers.com.
- Gomez, Shirley (August 3, 2022). "Suzette Quintanilla says her family is unbothered by critics". HOLA.
- Guerra, Jackie (2007). Under Construction How I've Gained and Lost Millions of Dollars and Hundreds of Pounds. New American Library. ISBN 9780451220301.
- Guerra, Joey (March 27, 2020). "Ranking Selena's albums: 'Dulce Amor' to 'Dreaming of You'". Houston Chronicle.
- Gouda Long, Rita (December 1, 2021). "Bumpboxx to release Limited-Edition Selena Bluetooth Boombox celebrating 25 Years of Selena's Legacy". PR Newswire. Gale A643361859 – via Gale Research.
- Hackleman, Esther (May 13, 2016). "MAC Unveils Its Selena Line". Corpus Christi Caller-Times – via Newspapers.com.
- Hackleman, Esther (September 30, 2016a). "MAC Line Launching In Homage To Tejano Icon". Corpus Christi Caller-Times – via Newspapers.com.
- Hanrahan, Laura (December 4, 2020). "Selena Quintanilla's Sister Suzette Is a Major Part of 'Selena: The Series,' but What's She Up to Now?". Cosmopolitan.
- Hanrahan, Laura (December 4, 2020b). "'Selena: The Series': Here's What Selena's Dad, Abraham Quintanilla, Is Up to Now". Cosmopolitan.
- Heller, Corinne (December 5, 2020). "Selena Quintanilla's Sister Suzette Reacts to Success of Netflix Series Amid Mixed Reviews". E! News.
- Herrera, Daniela (February 20, 2017). "How The #MACSelena Collection Came to Life". People en Español.
- Hernandez, Anissa R. (November 2, 1998). "Sound Stage Gives Q Productions A Place To Produce Music Videos". Corpus Christi Caller-Times – via Newspapers.com.
- Hernandez, Diana Eva (March 2, 2018). "Selena Bags On Sale Today At H-E-B". The Brownsville Herald – via Newspapers.com.
- Hirschberg, Victoria (April 1, 2005). "Selena's Shop Weathers Setbacks". The Monitor – via Newspapers.com.
- Hinojosa, Cassandra (January 22, 2005). "A Tribute To Selena". Corpus Christi Caller-Times – via Newspapers.com.
- Hornaday, Ann (March 21, 1997). "Song to Selena". Austin American-Statesman – via Newspapers.com.
- Huber, Craig (March 15, 2022). "New Selena music due out as soon as April". Spectrum News.
- Ibrahim, Samantha (March 16, 2022). "Selena's family accused of trying to profit off of posthumous album". New York Post.
- Inzunza, Francisco (May 9, 2021). "La desgarradora canción que Ricky Vela de Los Dinos compuso a Suzette, hermana de Selena Quintanilla". El Debate (in Spanish). ProQuest 2524669760.
- Jares, Andrea (April 28, 2000). "Work Day". Corpus Christi Caller-Times – via Newspapers.com.
- Jiménez, Jesus (December 13, 2025). "Abraham Quintanilla Jr., 86, Dies; Music Producer Steered Daughter Selena's Career". The New York Times.
- Jordan, Karen (September 7, 1997). "Selena Tour: Pilgrimage Brings Fans A Little Closer To Late Singing Star". The Post-Crescent – via Newspapers.com.
- Joseph, Harriett Denise (2018). From Santa Anna to Selena : notable Mexicanos and Tejanos in Texas history since 1821. University of North Texas Press. ISBN 978-1574417234.
- Langford, Terri (October 16, 1995). "Family, Workers Describe Selena's Hectic Final Days". Brazosport Facts – via Newspapers.com.
- Lapham, Bob (July 22, 1988). "Selena Headlines Show". Abilene Reporter-News – via Newspapers.com.
- Leyendo, Seguir (January 20, 2022). "El legado de Selena: su sobrino y una misteriosa gamer mantienen vivo su recuerdo". Infobae (in Spanish). ProQuest 2621880966.
- Lopez, Monica (February 19, 2019). "Take A Look At The First 2019 Stripes Selena Cup Design". Corpus Christi Caller-Times – via Newspapers.com.
- Márquez, Herón (2001). Latin Sensations. Lerner Publications Company. ISBN 9780822549932.
- Maldonado, Vilma (October 31, 1991). "Selena y Los Dinos Receives Gold Album". The Monitor – via Newspapers.com.
- Martin, Annie (February 18, 2020). "Selena Quintanilla to be honored at tribute concert". United Press International. Gale A614108788 – via Gale Research.
- Martin, Crystal (November 14, 2016). "Selena Lives On - Beautifully". The Miami Herald – via Newspapers.com.
- Martinez, Fidel (March 17, 2022). "Latinx Files: Are we ready for a 'computerized' Selena album?". Los Angeles Times.
- Martinez, Laura B. (April 3, 2018). "Stripes To Sell 'Limited Edition' Selena Cups". The Brownsville Herald – via Newspapers.com.
- Medina, John Henry (September 16, 2015). "Isabel Marie releases debut video 'Dime Porque'". Tejano Nation.
- Medina, John Henry (December 7, 2020). "Suzette Quintanilla shares her thoughts on 'Selena: The Series'". Tejano Nation.
- Medina, John Henry (April 23, 2025b). "Selena Honored with RIAA Lifetime Achievement Award at St. Jude's, 'Dreaming of You' Reaches 62x Platino". Tejano Nation.
- Medina, John Henry (May 13, 2025). "'Selena y Los Dinos' Documentary to Debut on Netflix This Winter". Tejano Nation.
- Mitchell, Rick (August 2, 1994). "Sunday crowd belonged to Selena". Houston Chronicle. ProQuest 296007841.
- Morales, Maria (April 2020). "Ella Es Eterna". People en Español. 23 (2).
- Myers, Ballie (July 17, 2015). "Selena Fans Sway MAC To Make Cosmetic Line". Corpus Christi Caller-Times – via Newspapers.com.
- Navarro, Juan Manuel (May 3, 1996). "El 'sueno' de Selena ahora es de su familia". El Norte (in Spanish). Gale A128425173 – via Gale Research.
- Nicolaou, Elena (December 5, 2020). "What Happened When Suzette Quintanilla Met With Her "Selena" Counterpart". Oprah Daily.
- Novas, Himilce (1995). Remembering Selena (1st ed.). Sagebrush Education Resources. ISBN 0-613-92637-4.
- Oboler, Suzanne; González, Deena J. (2005). The Oxford Encyclopedia of Latinos and Latinas in the United States. Oxford University Press. ISBN 9780195156003.
- Ocaná, Damarys (March 2005). "Surviving Selena". Latina. 9 (7).
- Osegueda, Elisa (March 31, 2020). "Inside Selena Quintanilla's World Domination 25 Years After Her Death". Entertainment Tonight.
- Parker, J. Michael (May 17, 1995). "Selena's fans line up for store's reopening". San Antonio Express-News. ProQuest 261566911.
- Patoski, Joe Nick (1996). Selena: Como La Flor. Little Brown and Company. ISBN 0-316-69378-2.
- Pérez, Chris (2012). To Selena, with Love. Penguin Books. ISBN 978-1-101-58026-4.
- Perez-Duthie, Juan Carlos (March 9, 2010). "Family Honors Tejana Singer With A Box-Set Collection". South Florida Sun Sentinel – via Newspapers.com.
- Perry, Clayton (April 26, 2011). "Interview: Suzette Quintanilla - Sister of Selena, the "Queen of Tejano Music"". Seattle Post-Intelligencer.
- Quiroz, Erica (January 29, 2015). "Celebrating Selena". Corpus Christi Caller-Times – via Newspapers.com.
- Edward James Olmos (narrator), Jose Behar (executive producer), Abraham Quintanilla (executive producer), Claribel Cuevas (associate producer), Randal J. Edwards (associate producer), Ila von Hasperg (editor), Jeffrey Coulter (producer), Cecelia Miniucchi (director) (April 1, 1997). Selena Remembered (Documentary). Corpus Christi, Texas: EMI Latin Productions, Q-Productions.
- Quintanilla, Selena (2002). Selena (Media notes). A.B. Quintanilla (producer), Suzette Quintanilla (spoken liner notes producer). EMI Latin. 724354099403.
- Ramirez, Ana; Garcia, Laura (October 7, 2016). "Fans Flock To Dillard's For Makeup Commemorating Fallen Music Legend". Victoria Advocate – via Newspapers.com.
- Ramirez, Chris (January 3, 2016). "A Key Festival's To Success". Corpus Christi Caller-Times – via Newspapers.com.
- Ramirez, Erika (October 8, 2011). "Hot Latin Songs Top Artists". Billboard. Vol. 123, no. 35.
- Reindl, Andrea (March 15, 2022). "Selena Quintanilla Fans Are Divided Over an Upcoming New Album in Which Her Voice Has Been 'Worked on With Computers'". Mitu.
- Rieken, Kristie (April 7, 2005). "Keeping Selena's Memory Alive". Bryan-College Station Eagle – via Newspapers.com.
- Richmond, Clint (1995). Selena! : The Phenomenal Life and Tragic Death of the Tejano Music Queen (1st ed.). Pocket Books. ISBN 0-671-54522-1.
- Rodriguez, Helena (January 9, 2001). "Latina Guide To Beauty Is Suave, Has Right Cosas". Abilene Reporter-News – via Newspapers.com.
- Sabawi, Fares (April 27, 2016). "Como La Flor". Corpus Christi Caller-Times – via Newspapers.com.
- Santos, Sarah Kaye; Rosenstein, Jenna (December 19, 2016). "The M.A.C. Selena Collection Is Coming Back!". Harper's BAZAAR.
- Sarabia, Bryan (September 17, 2026). "Brother of late Tejano singer Selena Quintanilla sues sister for $1M over estate, documents show". ABC7 Los Angeles.
- Sauceda, Isis (April 2010). "Selena Vive". People en Español. 13 (3).
- Sauceda, Iris (June 2015). "Los 50 Mas Bellos" [The 50 Most Beautiful]. People en Español (in Spanish). 18 (5). EBSCOhost 102324637.
- Scharf, Rachel (September 18, 2026). "Shein Says Selena Quintanilla Estate Can't Sue Over Knockoff Merch on Fast Fashion Site". Billboard.
- Sherman, Maria (November 14, 2025). "A new Netflix doc offers an intimate portrait of Selena, straight from her family's vault". AP News.
- Shropshire, Corilyn (October 7, 2016). "Fans Line Up To Purchase MAC's Selena Cosmetics". Chicago Tribune – via Newspapers.com.
- Stacy, Lee (2002). Mexico and the United States. Marshall Cavendish. ISBN 0-7614-7402-1.
- Shawn Stockman (July 2, 2025). "Keeping Selena Alive, Suzette Quintanilla Opens Up On Selena's Tragic Passing, Legacy, & Upbringing". YouTube (Podcast).
- Torres, Vicglamar (July 26, 2010). "A.B Quintanilla rinde homenaje a su padre". People en Español.
- Tracy, Kathleen (2000). Jennifer Lopez. ECW Press. ISBN 9781550224191.
- Valdez, Carlos (2005). Justice for Selena The State Versus Yolanda Saldivar. Trafford Publishing. ISBN 9781412065252.
- Valdes-Rodriguez, Alisa (April 9, 1999). "The Resonance of Selena". The Los Angeles Times – via Newspapers.com.
- Vargas, Deborah R. (2012). Dissonant divas in Chicana music: the limits of la onda. University of Minnesota Press. ISBN 9780816673162.
- Walsh, Savannah (December 15, 2020). "All About Suzette Quintanilla, Selena's Sister and Drummer". ELLE.
- Walters, Ivan (2016). A year of movies: 365 films to watch on the date they happened. Rowman & Littlefield. ISBN 9781442245600.
- Westenfeld, Adrienne (December 12, 2020). "Suzette Quintanilla Has Devoted Her Life to Commemorating Her Sister Selena's Legacy". Esquire.
- Wille, Matt (March 15, 2022). "New Selena album uses software to artificially age singer's childhood voice". InPut Magazine.
- Williams, Janice (December 3, 2020). "'Selena: The Series': Where Is Selena Quintanilla's Family Now?". Newsweek.
- Ybarra, Rose (March 31, 2005). "Star Gleams 10 Years After Tragic Death". The Monitor – via Newspapers.com.
- Zamora, Moises (2020). "Que Creias". Selena: The Series. Season 1. Netflix.

Business positions
Preceded by Abraham Quintanilla	CEO of Q-Productions; 2016–present	Incumbent
