= Isabel Marie =

American musical artist

- Born: March 2, 2003 (age 23); San Antonio, Texas, U.S.
- Genres: Tejano music
- Occupation: Singer
- Years active: 2015–present
- Label: Q-Productions
- Website: isabelmariesanchez.com

Isabel Marie Sanchez (born March 2, 2003) is an American Tejano music singer. Sanchez gained initial recognition as a child performer in various singing and dancing contests. Her breakthrough occurred on the third season of La Voz Kids, which caught the attention of record executive Abraham Quintanilla. Sanchez released her debut album, New Girl in Town in 2016, and received critical and commercial success. She was awarded the Tejano Music Award for Best New Female Artist, becoming the youngest recipient of the award. Her second album, Sígueme (2017), was nominated for Album of the Year, while her third studio effort, Xoxo - Hugs and Kisses (2018), achieved commercial success. After her fourth album, IV (2019), was released, Sanchez departed Q-Productions, indicating a desire for a new musical direction. Her fifth album, Una Illusion (2022), earned her a nomination for the Latin Grammy Award for Best Tejano Album. Sanchez has been active in charitable and non-profit organizations and was honored by the Texas House of Representatives for her contributions to the arts and community.

== Career ==
=== 2003-2016: Early life and career beginnings ===
Isabel Marie Sanchez was born on March 2, 2003, in Corpus Christi, Texas, to musician Carlos Sanchez. The family moved to Chicago, Illinois during Sanchez's minority. Sanchez began singing professionally at the age of nine. Following her family's relocation to San Antonio, Texas after her father received a job opportunity, Sanchez inked a contract with a local booking agency. A woman associated with Sábado Gigante, captured Sanchez's performance at Market Square, and reached out to her, inviting her to participate in the Father's Day edition of the show. Sanchez performed "La Malagueña" on the show, winning the $1,000 (2013 USD) competition. She rose to fame bolstered by her participation in the third season of La Voz Kids. Sanchez performed "Cucurrucucú Paloma", which earned her the admiration of the judges and audience alike, eliciting a standing ovation from them. Spanish singer Natalia Jiménez was effusive in her praise of Sanchez, referring to her as having "a voice of a Goddess" and being an "exceptional vocalist". In 2014, People en Español invited Sanchez to sing the national anthem and bestow upon Don Francisco the Icon of the Year Award.

Sanchez's recording of Juan Gabriel's "De Mí Enamórate" (1986) caught the attention of Abraham Quintanilla. After witnessing her appearance on La Voz Kids, Abraham contacted Sanchez and furnished her with two songs that he wrote specifically for her to record. The swift recording of both songs, accomplished in just 45 minutes, culminated in Abraham submitting them for radio airplay. He then offered Sanchez a five-year recording contract through his label, Q-Productions, under his and Suzette Quintanilla's guidance. Abraham was confident in his decision to sign Sanchez, as he regarded her as having the entire package sought by record companies, encompassing "talent, youth, personality, stage presence, and image". Sanchez debuted her studio album, New Girl in Town, in 2016, receiving critical acclaim. The album featured "Fallaste Corazon", "Pero Como Voy A Olvidar" and "Un Beso", all of which appeared on the Tejano Gold Countdown. Sanchez achieved the distinction of being the youngest and first artist to have three songs concurrently featured on the radio chart. Her performance at the Fort Worth Stock Show and Rodeo in 2015 left the audience impressed.

Sanchez performed at the 2016 Fiesta de la Flor, and opened the festival with a fusion of Tejano and pop songs to a crowd of "hundreds of fans". Her second appearance at the 2017 Fiesta de la Flor was met with widespread acclaim, with Esther Hakleman of the Corpus Christi Caller-Times referring to Sanchez as a "young vocal powerhouse". Sanchez's renditions of Selena's "No Me Queda Más" (1994) and "Dreaming of You" (1995), received positive feedback from concertgoers. In September 2017, Sanchez regaled the audience at the Fort Worth Bootfest festival, performing at a tribute concert for Selena alongside Pete Astudillo.

=== 2017-2020: Sígueme and departure of Q-Productions ===
Sanchez's second studio album, Sígueme (2017), was "hugely successful". Sanchez named the album after a fan proposed it as an apt contender during a contest she hosted on her Facebook page, where she solicited potential album names from her fans. Sanchez singled out her rendition of Selena's "Dreaming of You", featured on Sígueme, as the track that meant the most to her, as she was prompted to record it at the behest of Abraham. The recording session for "Dreaming of You" was an emotionally charged affair, with all those present, including Sanchez herself, overcome with emotion in the recording booth.

At the 2017 Tejano Music Awards, Sanchez won Best New Female Artist at the age of 15, setting the record for the youngest participant of the award. However, her feat was surpassed at the 2018 Tejano Music Awards by 11-year-old Mia Garcia. Sanchez was a nominee for three awards at the 2018 Tejano Music Awards, namely Album of the Year for Sígueme, Song of the Year for "Porque Tu No Estas", and Female Vocalist of the Year.

Sanchez performed at the first Tejano Music Hall of Fame Awards in April 2018, where she won Best New Artist. Sanchez won Top Female Artist at the My Tejano Awards in Mission, Texas and performed a tribute to Laura Canales. She released her third album, Xoxo - Hugs and Kisses, that same year, and reached the top-ten of iTunes' Latin Albums sales chart. In 2019, Sanchez headlined the entertainment concert at the Viva Quad Cities event at LeClaire Park in Davenport, Iowa, where Tar Macias of Hola America hailed her as a vocalist with "powerful vocals and wide range". Sanchez was a nominee for Female Vocalist of the Year at the 2019 Tejano Music Awards. On December 31, 2019, Sanchez released her fourth album, IV. The album included a cover of José Alfredo Jiménez's "Cuatro Copas", which Sanchez recorded as a duet with Kumbia All-Starz vocalist Ramon Vargas, and a Mazz medley that was dedicated to Jimmy Gonzalez. Sanchez performed a tribute to Selena, backed by the Colorado Symphony under the direction of conductor Christopher Dragon.

Sanchez was slated to perform at Selena XXV, a live tribute concert that was scheduled to be staged at the Alamodome and broadcast on Univision in 2020. However, the concert was scuppered due to the COVID-19 pandemic. Sanchez capitalized on the reach of her Facebook and TikTok accounts to connect with her fans during the pandemic. She declined to renew her five-year contract with Q-Productions after successfully fulfilling her contractual obligations to the label. In an interview with Mando San Roman of Super Tejano 102.1 in the Rio Grande Valley, Sanchez revealed that she and her team had resolved to venture forth into new musical terrain, stating that "we think it's time to spread our wings. Thank God we have a lot of opportunities in the music industry and we're weighing out our options right now. We’ll see and go on the path that God takes us. We're really excited and we have a lot of new things coming up, we're recording some songs". Sanchez was a nominee for Female Vocalist of the Year at the 2020 Tejano Music Awards, while her album, IV, received a nomination for Album of the Year, and her duet on "Cuatro Copas" garnered a nod for Vocal Duo of the Year.

=== 2021-present: Una Ilusion and current projects ===
In December 2021, Sanchez released her EP Live Sessions - En Vivo, which featured a cover of Bobby Pulido's "Desvelado" (1995). In the same month, Sanchez dropped a rendition of Bing Crosby's "I'll Be Home for Christmas" (1943), which the Tejano Nation review described as having an "intimate piano lounge-style [which] showcases [Sanchez's] smooth vocals with a jazzy feel, perfect for the season".

Sanchez released her first single, "No Me Mires Asi", after parting ways with Q-Productions, in February 2022. According to Medina, the song boasts an "up-tempo electro cumbia with Sonora style trumpet creating a festive sound". In May 2022, Sanchez dropped her fifth studio album, Una Ilusion, which she co-produced. The album featured a mix of cumbia, Tejano rancheras, and mariachi music. Sanchez was nominated for the Latin Grammy Award for Best Tejano Album for Una Ilusion. Reacting to the announcement, Sanchez exclaimed, "[I] can’t believe this, still hasn’t sinked in yet" during an interview with TejanoNation. The title track was produced by Carlos H. Alvarez and written by Juan Trevino, was released on January 25, 2023. John Henry Medina lauded it as a lively Tejano ranchera, blending progressive keyboard sounds and accordion while commending Sanchez's voice for its sensual quality.

At the 2023 Tejano Music Awards, Sanchez was nominated for Female Vocalist of the Year, while "Ahora Que Ya Eres Feliz" was nominated for the Tejano Music Award for Song of the Year.

== Personal life ==
Sanchez transitioned to homeschooling by seventh grade and completed high school in November 2020. Sanchez has cited Vicente Fernandez, Whitney Houston, Mariah Carey, Selena, Lola Beltran, and Marc Anthony as her primary vocal influences. Sanchez regards Selena as her role model, and considers Houston to be her most significant inspiration. Sanchez has been active in charitable and non-profit organizations, including serving as a member of the Lulac Youth Council Chapter 1124. In 2017, the Texas House of Representatives Diana Arevalo, Abel Herrero, and Barbara Gervin-Hawkins, honored Sanchez for her contributions to the arts and the community, with Arevalo describing the occasion as "this is an important moment to honor a former student from the Young Women's Leadership Academy who is following her dreams and accomplishing so much at a young age". Sanchez has been involved in cancer support groups since losing one aunt to cancer and seeing another recover from it. She feels that "it's always awesome to lift their spirits" and aims to contribute in any way possible to find a cure for cancer saying that she doesn't "think that anyone should ever go through that type of experience". Sanchez performed at The Water Works in Buffalo Bayou Park in Houston, Texas, in June 2022, as part of National Children's Day festivities.

== Discography ==
- New Girl in Town (2016)
- Sigueme (2017)
- Xoxo - Hugs and Kisses (2018)
- IV (2019)
- Una Ilusion (2022)

== See also ==
- List of Hispanic and Latino Americans
- Music of Texas
- Women in Latin music

== Works cited ==
- Harris, Kyle (August 13, 2019). "Colorado Symphony Adds Another Night of the Music of Selena". Westword.
- Guerra, Joey (July 10, 2019). "A symphony of love for Tejano icon Selena". Houston Chronicle.
- "Twelve-year-old Isabel Marie Sanchez Wows Fort Worth Stock Show and Rodeo Crowd". Wrangler Network.
- Ramírez, Fátima (July 8, 2022). "Inspired by Selena, Isabel Marie Sánchez finds her own voice in Tejano music". El Tecolote.
- "Adassa, Isabel Marie are among the lineup of The Kids Lets Party! Fest in Houston for National Children's Day". Tejano Nation. April 25, 2022.
- Carrizales, Sylvia M. (August 30, 2019). "Isabel Marie grateful for fans' support after tragic loss". Tejano Nation.
- Carrizales, Sylvia M. (November 17, 2019). "39th annual Tejano Music Awards filled with memorable performances". Tejano Nation.
- Medina, John Henry (June 20, 2017). "Isabel Marie talks sophomore album 'Sígueme' + more on Tejano Nation Podcast". Tejano Nation.
- Medina, John Henry (May 23, 2019). "Isabel Marie Sanchez wins Top Female Artist, pays tribute to Laura Canales at My Tejano Awards [VIDEO]". Tejano Nation.
- Medina, John Henry (January 2, 2020). "Isabel Marie drops fourth album 'IV'". Tejano Nation.
- Medina, John Henry (November 10, 2020). "Isabel Marie Sanchez is officially a high school graduate". Tejano Nation.
- Medina, John Henry (December 23, 2020). "Shelly Lares, Jay Perez, Stevie D, and JR Gomez top winners at 40th annual Tejano Music Awards featuring virtual performances". Tejano Nation.
- Medina, John Henry (May 6, 2021). "Isabel Marie Sanchez leaves Q Productions after five years to 'spread wings'". Tejano Nation.
- Medina, John Henry (March 2, 2021). "Isabel Marie Sanchez celebrates 18th birthday as she readies fifth album". Tejano Nation.
- Medina, John Henry (September 20, 2022). "Isabel Marie receives first Latin Grammy nomination for 'Una Ilusión' EP". TejanoNation.net.
- Medina, John Henry (May 31, 2022). "Isabel Marie embarks on new adventures with 'Una Ilusión' EP". TejanoNation.net.
- Medina, John Henry (February 4, 2022). "Isabel Marie Sanchez returns with new up-tempo electro cumbia single 'No Me Mires Asi'". Tejano Nation.
- Medina, John Henry (January 24, 2022). "Isabel Marie Sanchez covers 'Desvelado' as she readies new single after release of 'Live Sessions (En Vivo)' EP". Tejano Nation.
- Medina, John Henry (January 25, 2023). "Isabel Marie drops the title track of Latin Grammy-nominated EP 'Una Ilusión'". TejanoNation.net.
- "Isabel Marie displays her amazing vocals on holiday classic 'I'll Be Home For Christmas'". Tejano Nation. December 22, 2021.
- Arevalo, Diana (May 22, 2017). "Representatives Arevalo, Herrero and Gervin-Hawkins Honor Isabel Marie Sanchez For Her Contributions To The Arts and the Community". States News Service. Gale 8c26981c.
- Macias, Tar (July 25, 2019). "Viva Quad Cities is proud to announce our 2019 entertainment headliner Isabel Marie Sanchez". Hola America. ProQuest 196403.
- "La Orquesta Sinfónica de Houston homenajea la música de Selena Quintanilla". EFE (in Spanish). July 12, 2019. ProQuest 196403.
- "Tejana Profile: Isabel Marie". La Prensa. August 16, 2019. ProQuest 196403.
- Falcon, Meagen (March 14, 2020). "Selena XXV Concert in SA to be Rescheduled". Corpus Christi Caller-Times – via Newspapers.com.
- Lopez, Monica (November 23, 2018). "11-Year-Old Texan Wins Tejano Music Award". Corpus Christi Caller-Times – via Newspapers.com.
- Martinez, Eduardo (April 13, 2018). "Tejano Music Hall of Fame Awards on Sunday". The Monitor – via Newspapers.com.
- Hackleman, Esther (February 3, 2016). "Bigger, Better Than Before". Corpus Christi Caller-Times – via Newspapers.com.
- Hackleman, Esther (March 24, 2017). "Selena Festival Welcomes Star-Studded Lineup". Corpus Christi Caller-Times – via Newspapers.com.
- Perez, Isamel (July 12, 2017). "Bootfest Announces 2017 Diverse Musical Lineup". Victoria Advocate – via Newspapers.com.
- Garcia, Julie (May 7, 2016). "Fans of La Flor Celebrate". Corpus Christi Caller-Times – via Newspapers.com.
- Enos, Morgan (September 20, 2022). "2022 Latin GRAMMYs: Complete Winners & Nominations List". Grammy.com.
- Medina, John Henry (October 21, 2023). "43rd Tejano Music Awards: Siggno, Mike Gonzalez & The Iconiczz among big winners". Tejano Nation.
