= El Dolor de Tu Presencia =

Single by Jennifer Peña
- Language: Spanish
- Written: Rudy Pérez
- Published: 2002

"El Dolor de Tu Presencia" (English: "The Pain of Your Presence") is a song from Jennifer Peña’s 2002 album Libre. The song was the second to be released from the album, after the promotional single “Vamos al Mundial.” The song charted at #1 on the Billboard Hot Latin Tracks for eight weeks during 2002 and stayed on the chart for 32 weeks, making it Jennifer Peña’s most successful single to date. The album also charted in the #2 position for the Billboard Regional Mexican Airplay chart, as well as the #11 position for the Billboard Latin Pop Songs Chart. In addition to being featured on Libre, the track is also included on Peña’s live album, Houston Rodeo Live, as well as on the compilation El Dolor de Tu Presencia Y Muchos Exitos Más.

The song is originally by Ednita Nazario. It was first released in 1986 on the album Tú Sin Mí.

== Versions ==
- "El Dolor de Tu Presencia" (Versión Pop) 3:26
- "El Dolor de Tu Presencia" (Versión Cumbia) 3:29
- "El Dolor de Tu Presencia" (En Vivo) 4:43
