= Q-Productions =

Q Productions
- Founded: 1990
- Founder: Abraham Quintanilla
- Genre: Tejano, Mariachi
- Country of origin: United States
- Location: 5410 Leopard Street, Corpus Christi, Texas, U.S.

Q-Productions, Inc. is a Latin music entertainment company founded by Abraham Quintanilla. Founded in 1990, Q-Productions is a record company and studio (Q-Zone Records and Q-Zone Studios) specializing in the Latin music industry. The company's most recognized contributing artists are Selena (who was the daughter of Abraham), Los Tres Reyes and Jennifer Peña. Q also experiments with film and video.

Suzette Quintanilla was appointed chief executive of Q-Productions in May 2016, after her father, Abraham stepped down. She oversees the label's operations, manages the Selena Museum, and directs licensing initiatives for Selena-related ventures.The company's headquarters are at 5410 Leopard Street, Corpus Christi, Texas.

== Recording studios ==
Q-Productions has three studios, Zebra Room, Leopard Lounge and Grey Fox Room.

== Selena Museum ==
A collection of designs and mementos of Selena are housed at the studio site. The collection includes items from Selena's wardrobe to her favorite toys from when she was young.

== Artists ==
- Selena (1990–1995)
- Jennifer Peña (1996–2000)
- La Fuerza
- Los Tres Reyes
- Cortez De La Sierra
- Jorge Roel Y Potrillo
- Sesi
- La Conquista
- Stephenie Lynn
- Angel Castillo
- Isabel Marie Sanchez
- Ricardo Castillon of La Diferenzia

== See also ==
- List of music museums
