= Tuya (Jennifer Peña song) =

Single by Jennifer Peña

from the album Dicen Que El Tiempo
- Released: July 16, 2007
- Recorded: 2006
- Genre: Latin pop; latin ballad
- Length: 3:48
- Label: Univision
- Songwriters: Jennifer Peña; Obie Bermúdez
- Producers: Sebastian Krys; Jennifer Peña

Jennifer Peña singles chronology
"Cómo Entender" (2007)	"Tuya" (2007)

"Tuya" (Yours) is a Latin pop ballad written by Jennifer Peña and her now-husband, Obie Bermúdez, and produced by Peña and Sebastian Krys. It was released on July 16, 2007, it was the second single from Peña's album Dicen Que El Tiempo (2007) and became the bigger hit of the two singles released from the album. It peaked at #5 on Billboard's Hot Latin Tracks chart, making it Peña's biggest hit since 2004's "Vivo y Muero en Tu Piel," and her third biggest hit overall. The music video stirred up some controversy due to its portrayal of both heterosexual and homosexual couples in love. Cumbia, dance, and reggaeton remixes were released in support of the single.

== Track listings ==
Promo CD single

1. Tuya (Georgie's Givin' It Tuya Vocal Mix) 7:30
2. Tuya (Georgie's Givin' It Tuya Dub Mix) 7:27
3. Tuya (Georgie's Givin' It Tuya Radio Mix) 3:42
4. Tuya (Reggaeton Clubber Mix) 3:28
5. Tuya (Reggaeton Instrumental Mix) 3:28
