= A Selena Tribute =

Promotional single by Jennifer Lopez
- Released: May 4, 2015
- Venue: BankUnited Center (Coral Gable, FL)
- Length: 6:34
- Label: Epic
- Songwriters: Ricky Vela; A.B. Quintanilla; Selena; Pete Astudillo; Keith Thomas
- Producers: Quintanilla III; Abraham Quintanilla Jr.; Bebu Silvetti; Jorge Alberto Pino; Gregg Vickers; Thomas; Bryant Siono

Audio video
- "A Selena Tribute" on YouTube

"A Selena Tribute" is a tribute song performed by American singer and actress Jennifer Lopez. The track was performed live during the 2015 Billboard Latin Music Awards as a homage for American singer Selena, backed by her former band Los Dinos. It was released the following day on 3 May 2015 as a digital download. The single consists of a medley of six Selena's songs: "Como la Flor", "Bidi Bidi Bom Bom", "Amor Prohibido", "I Could Fall in Love" and "No Me Queda Mas".

== Charts ==
Chart (2015)	Peak position
US Hot Latin Songs (Billboard)	31
US Latin Digital Songs (Billboard)	3
