= Seducción (Jennifer Peña album) =

Studio album by Jennifer Peña
- Released: May 18, 2004
- Recorded: 2003–2004
- Studios: Crescent Moon Studios; Cuero Room Studios; DB Music Productions Studios; L.M. Recording Studios; Lemon Tree Studios; Santander Studios; South Beach Audio; TCMP Studio (Miami, FL); The Beach House Recording Studios; North Bay Recording Studios; The Playroom Recording Studios (Miami Beach, FL)
- Genres: Latin pop; latin ballad
- Length: 49:06
- Language: Spanish
- Label: Univision
- Producers: Jennifer Peña; Kike Santander; Rudy Pérez; Emilio Estefan, Jr.; Daniel Betancourt; Manny Lara; Gaitán Bros.; José Luis Arroyave; Tulio Cremisini; Carlos Infante; José Behar (Executive producer)

Jennifer Peña chronology
| Libre (2002) | Seducción (2004) | Houston Rodeo Live (2004) |

Singles from Seducción
- 1. "Vivo y Muero En Tu Piel" Released: March 22, 2004; 2. "Hasta El Fin Del Mundo" Released: July 19, 2004; 3. "Si Me Vuelvo A Enamorar" Released: October 18, 2004; 4. "No Hay Nadie Igual Como Tú" Released: February 7, 2005

Seducción (English: Seduction) is the sixth studio album recorded by Mexican-American recording artist Jennifer Peña, The album was released by Univision Records on May 18, 2004 (see 2004 in music). This effort debuted at number one on the Billboard Top Latin Albums chart.

== Background ==
This recording reteamed the singer with Rudy Pérez, Kike Santander and offered new production by Emilio Estefan Jr. "Vivo y Muero En Tu Piel" was selected as the lead single, and peaked at number one in the Hot Latin Tracks charts, her second single to do so. Seducción was released in a traditional CD package format and also as a CD/DVD combo which included the original track listing and a DVD with documentary, music videos and a picture gallery. The album was received well selling over 300,000, being certified multi-platinum by the RIAA. On this production, Jennifer Peña became a contributing producer for the first time on the tracks "Ya Verás" and "Si Yo Me Vuelvo A Enamorar". It was once again executive produced by José Behar, head of Univision Music Group. Heavy promotion followed the album which included stops in Central America, South America and all across the United States and Puerto Rico.

The success of this album led to many nominations for the Billboard Latin Music Award, including: Latin Pop Album of the Year for the album, and Latin Pop Airplay Track of the Year, Tropical Airplay Track of the Year and Regional Mexican Airplay Track of the Year for the first single "Vivo y Muero en Tu Piel". Also Jennifer received the Premio Lo Nuestro for Female Entertainer of the Year.

== Track listing ==
The information from Billboard

=== CD ===
| No. | Title | Writer(s) | Length |
|---|---|---|---|
| 1. | "Vivo y Muero en Tu Piel" | Rudy Pérez | 4:28 |
| 2. | "Cumba Iho" | Kike Santander · Gustavo Santander | 3:58 |
| 3. | "Para Olvidarte de Mí" | Rudy Pérez | 3:06 |
| 4. | "Hasta el Fin del Mundo" | Manny López · Rudy Pérez | 3:53 |
| 5. | "Ya Verás" | Jennifer Peña · Roger "El León" Peña · Rudy Pérez | 3:55 |
| 6. | "Cómo Saber" | Alberto Gaitán · Ricardo Gaitán · Nicolás Tovar | 4:29 |
| 7. | "Si Yo Me Vuelvo a Enamorar" | Ángel "Cucco" Peña · Roger "El León" Peña · Rudy Pérez | 3:10 |
| 8. | "Fuera de Mi Vida" | Manny López · Rudy Pérez | 4:03 |
| 9. | "No Hay Nadie Igual Como Tú" | Bob Crewe · Bob Gaudio · Spanish: Adapt: Rudy Pérez | 3:31 |
| 10. | "Aunque Me Cueste la Vida" | Kike Santander · Gustavo Santander · Tulio Cremisini | 3:26 |
| 11. | "Vivo y Muero en Tu Piel (Norteña)" | Rudy Pérez | 3:40 |
| 12. | "Vivo y Muero en Tu Piel (Salsa)" | Rudy Pérez | 3:48 |
| 13. | "Hasta el Fin del Mundo (Norteña)" | Manny López · Rudy Pérez | 3:39 |

=== DVD ===
The information from Allmusic.

| No. | Title | Length |
|---|---|---|
| 1. | "At The Studio (Interviews)" |
| 2. | "Behind The Scenes" |
| 3. | "Vivo y Muero en Tu Piel (Multimedia Track)" |
| 4. | "Vivo y Muero en Tu Piel (Multimedia Track)" |
| 5. | "Vamos Al Mundial (Multimedia Track)" |
| 6. | "Photo Gallery" |
| 7. | "Biography" |

== Credits and personnel ==
Adapted from Allmusic.

=== Personnel ===
- José Behar – Executive producer
- Luz De La Cruz – Executive producer
- Emilio Estefan Jr. – Producer
- Carlos Infante – Producer
- Manny Lara – Producer
- Kike Santander – Producer
- Jennifer Peña – Performer, producer
- Gaitán Bros. – Programming, producer
- Rudy Pérez – Guitar, arranger, producer, vocals, direction
- José Luis Arroyave – Arranger, keyboards, programming, producer
- Daniel Betancourt – Arranger, keyboards, programming, producer
- Tulio Cremisini – Arranger, electric guitar, keyboards, programming, producer
- Clay Perry – Arranger, keyboards, programming
- Boris Milan – Mixing
- Andrés Bermúdez – Engineer
- Bruce Weeden – Engineer
- Scott Canto – Engineer
- Juan Jose Virviescas – Engineer
- Alfred Figueroa – Engineer
- Joel Numa – Engineer
- David López – Assistant engineer
- Richie Pérez – Assistant engineer
- Daniel Ponce – Assistant engineer
- Kevin Dillon – Production coordination
- Leyla Leeming – Production Coordination
- Betsy Perez – Production Coordination
- José Juan Maldonado – Production Coordination
- Ángela Duque – Artist coordination
- Steve Menezes – Studio Coordinator
- Andrés Castro – acoustic guitar, electric guitar
- Manny López – Guitar, arranger, keyboards, programming
- Richard Bravo – percussion
- Julio Hernández – Bass
- Sergio Minski – Acoustic guitar, electric guitar, production coordination
- Archie Peña – Percussion, drums
- Rafael Vergara – vocals
- Area 305 – Vocals
- Vicky Echeverri – Vocals
- Robin Espejo – Vocals
- Mario Patiño – Creative director
- Adriana Rebold – Graphic design, art direction
- Gio Alma – Photography
- Vaughn Smith – Video director
- Irma Martínez – Stylist

== Charts ==
| Chart (2004) | Peak position |
|---|---|
| U.S. Billboard Top Latin Albums | 1 |
| U.S. Billboard Latin Pop Albums | 1 |
| U.S. Billboard Top Heatseekers | 7 |
| U.S. Billboard 200 | 162 |

== Sales and certifications ==
| Region | Certification | Certified units/sales |
|---|---|---|
| United States (RIAA) | 2× Platinum (Latin) | 120,000^{‡} |
^{‡} Sales+streaming figures based on certification alone.

== Notes ==
- Seducción at AllMusic
