= Libre (Jennifer Peña album) =

2002 studio album by Jennifer Peña

Studio album by Jennifer Peña
- Released: June 11, 2002
- Recorded: 2001–2002
- Studio: Doberman Records; Mora-Arriaga Recording Studios; Santander Studios; Studio G; Olde Bear Music Recording Studio; South Beach Studios (Miami, FL); North Bay Recording Studios; The Playroom Recording Studios (Miami Beach, FL); The Backroom (Glendale, CA)
- Genre: Latin pop; regional Mexican; latin ballad
- Length: 57:33
- Language: Spanish
- Label: Univision
- Producer: Rudy Pérez; Kike Santander; Gustavo Santander; Enrique Elizondo; José Luis Arroyave; José Gaviria; José Behar (Executive producer)

Jennifer Peña chronology
Abrázame y Bésame (2000)	Libre (2002)	Seducción (2004)

Singles from Libre
- 1. "Vamos Al Mundial" Released: January 14, 2002; 2. "El Dolor de Tu Presencia" Released: April 15, 2002; 3. "Entre el Delirio y la Locura" Released: October 21, 2002; 4. "A Fuego Lento" Released: November 18, 2002; 5. "Tu Me Completas" Released: January 6, 2003

Libre (English: Free) is the fifth studio album recorded by Mexican-American singer Jennifer Peña. The album was released by Univision Records on June 11, 2002 (see 2002 in music), Libre debuted on Billboard Top Latin Albums Chart at #2 with a 17 track listing of which spawned several top ten hits including "Vamos al Mundial", which was selected by the U.S. Hispanic network Univisión as the official song of the 2002 World Cup Soccer tournament. Libre also includes the #1 Hot Latin Track "El Dolor de Tu Presencia" which spent eight weeks atop of the charts in the summer of 2002 along with "Entre el Delirio y la Locura". Recorded in Miami Beach, Florida and Glendale, California it was executive produced by José Behar and included production by Rudy Pérez, Kike Santander, Gustavo Santander, Enrique Elizondo, José Luis Arroyave and José Gaviria. Libre was a crossover album for Peña, who has spent the first phase of her career recording Tejano music. Libre re-introduced Jennifer as a pop singer with romantic ballads, dance songs that were far more mainstream than anything she had recorded before. Libre became one of the most successful Latin albums of 2002 selling over 500,000 units certified multi-Platinum by the RIAA. The album was nominated for a Grammy Award.

== Track listing ==
No.	Title	Writer(s)	Length
1.	"El Dolor de Tu Presencia"	Rudy Pérez	3:28
2.	"Corazón Banbdido"	Juan Marcelo	3:14
3.	"Prefiero Irme Enamorada"	Rudy Pérez	3:45
4.	"Apapachandonos"	Juan Marcelo	3:15
5.	"Entre El Delirio y La Locura"	Kike Santander	4:18
6.	"Qué Me Ames Mas"	Rudy Pérez	3:05
7.	"Tú Me Completas"	Rudy Pérez	3:19
8.	"Cómo Te Cae"	Mario Patiño	2:48
9.	"A Fuego Lento"	José Luis Arroyave	3:56
10.	"Enséñame"	Roberto Livi; Rudy Pérez	3:42
11.	"El Dolor de Tu Presencia" (Versión Cumbia)	Rudy Pérez	3:30
12.	"Prefiero Irme Enamorada" (Versión Cumbia Norteña)	Rudy Pérez	3:15
13.	"Entre El Delirio y La Locura" (Versión Cumbia)	Kike Santander	3:06
14.	"Entre El Delirio y La Locura" (Versión Grupera)	Kike Santander	3:58
15.	"Tú Me Completas" (Versión Cumbia)	Rudy Pérez	3:14
16.	"A Fuego Lento" (Versión Cumbia)	Rudy Pérez	4:07
17.	"Vamos Al Mundial"	Rudy Pérez	5:49

== Singles ==
- "Vamos Al Mundial" (2002) FIFA World Cup Song (PROMO)
- "El Dolor De Tu Presencia" (2002) Hot Latin Tracks # 1 for 8 Weeks
- "Entre El Delirio y La Locura" (2002) Hot Latin Tracks # 6
- "A Fuego Lento" (2003) Hot Latin Tracks # 21

== Credits and personnel ==
=== Personnel ===
- Levi Mora Arriaga – keyboards
- Meredith Mora Arriaga – guitar
- José Luis Arroyave – arranger, engineer, keyboards, producer, programming
- José Behar – executive producer
- Nelson Cano – vocals
- Vicky Echeverri – vocals
- Enrique Elizondo – engineer, producer
- Joaquin Pérez Fernández – engineer
- Jonathon Fuzessy – vocal coordinator, vocals
- Claudia García – vocals
- Iker Gastaminza – mixing
- José Gaviria – arranger, engineer, keyboards, producer, programming
- Beppe Gemelli – keyboards, programming
- Piero Gemelli – guitar
- Gabby Giannelli – art coordinator
- Bernie Grundman – mastering
- Julio Hernández – bass
- Paul Hoyle – arranger, keyboards, programming
- Erick Labson – mastering
- David López – assistant engineer
- Manny López – guitar
- Alfredo Matheus – mixing
- Sergio Minski – production coordination
- David Mora-arriaga – Bass
- Joel Numa – engineer, mixing
- José Luis Pagán – arranger, keyboards, programming
- Mario Patiño – production coordination
- Jennifer Peña – vocals
- Betsy Pérez – production coordination
- Rudy Pérez – arranger, director, guitar, producer, vocals
- Clay Perry – keyboards, programming
- Catalina Rodríguez – vocals
- Barry Rosen – photography
- Arturo Salas – arranger
- Manuel Sánchez – mixing
- Kike Santander – producer
- Andrés Felipe Silva – executive director
- Ramiro Terán – arranger, keyboards, programming, vocal coordinator, vocals
- Fernando Tobón – bass, guitar (acoustic), guitar (electric)
- Juan José Virviescas – engineer
- Dan Warner – guitar
- Bruce Weeden – engineer, mixing

== Charts ==
Chart (2002)	Peak position
US Top Latin Albums (Billboard)	2
US Regional Mexican Albums (Billboard)	1
US Heatseekers Albums (Billboard)	6

== Sales and certifications ==
Region	Certification	Certified units/sales
United States (RIAA)	2× Platinum (Latin)	200,000^{^}
^{^} Shipments figures based on certification alone.
