= Houston Rodeo Live =

Live album by Jennifer Peña
- Released: November 2, 2004
- Recorded: March 14, 2004; Houston Livestock Show & Rodeo (Houston, Texas)
- Genre: Latin pop, Regional Mexican
- Label: Univision Music Group
- Producer: Rudy Pérez / Jennifer Peña

Jennifer Peña chronology
Seduccion (2004)	Houston Rodeo Live (2004)	Dicen Que El Tiempo (2007)

Houston Rodeo Live is a live album released by Jennifer Peña on November 2, 2004 it was recorded on March 14, 2004, at the Houston Livestock Show & Rodeo in Houston, Texas in front of a crowd of over 61,000 spectators on Go Tejano Day alongside Mexican Grupera band El Gigante de America. The album was made available digitally, by CD and CD/DVD combo. It sold 100,000 units, becoming Peña's seventh Platinum certified album by the RIAA. A bestseller in spite of never having an official single, early TV slots promoted a duet with Obie Bermúdez "No Se Nada De Ti" which was later scrapped off the tracklist. Instead, it only featured one unreleased song Por Amor and a dozen of Jennifer's hits "Si Tu Te Vas", Contigo Otra Vez, and El Dolor De Tu Presencia in live format recorded before the release of her sixth effort Seducción; it also included "Vivo Y Muero En Tu Piel".

== Track listing ==
No.	Title	Length
1.	"Intro"	0:17
2.	"A Fuego Lento"	5:07
3.	"El Dolor de Tu Presencia"	4:43
4.	"Si Tu Te Vas"	2:56
5.	"Contigo Orta Vez"	3:52
6.	"Prefiero Irme Enamorada"	4:54
7.	"Vivo y Muero en Tu Piel"	3:33
8.	"No Te Voy a Perdonar"	5:22
9.	"Wind Beneath My Wings"	6:17
10.	"Entre El Delirio y La Locura"	4:50
11.	"Por Amor"	4:24

== Charts ==
Chart (2004)	Peak position
US Top Latin Albums (Billboard)	10
US Latin Pop Albums (Billboard)	4
US Heatseekers Albums (Billboard)	13

== Sales and certifications ==
Region	Certification	Certified units/sales
United States (RIAA)	Platinum (Latin)	100,000^{^}
^{^} Shipments figures based on certification alone.
