= Dicen Que El Tiempo =

Studio album by Jennifer Peña
- Released: February 27, 2007
- Recorded: California, Florida, San Antonio
- Genres: Latin pop, Dance / Ska
- Label: Univision Music Group
- Producers: Jennifer Peña, Sebastian Krys

Jennifer Peña chronology
Houston Rodeo Live (2004)	Dicen Que El Tiempo (2007)	Superacíon (2025)

Singles from Dicen Que El Tiempo
- 1. "Como Entender"; 2. "Tuya"

Dicen Que El Tiempo (They Say That Time) is a 2007 Grammy Award nominated album and seventh studio album released by Jennifer Peña on February 27, 2007. Dicen Que El Tiempo was a departure from Peña's previous albums which included material written and produced by A.B. Quintanilla, Rudy Pérez and Kike Santander who wrote previous hits like El Dolor De Tu Presencia and Hasta El Fin Del Mundo. Peña served as a lead producer with shared credits for songwriting and musical production with Obie Bermúdez and Sebastian Krys.

In support of the album, MTVTr3s selected Peña as the Artist of The Month on February 7, 2007 with multiple TV slots which included co-hosting Mi-TRL and Los Hits and a special Jennifer Peña week. While co-hosting Mi-TRL Peña premiered the album's lead single Cómo Entender in a live performance. The album and the first single received minimal reception on radio and on the charts the album debuted at #16 on Billboards Top Latin Albums chart and the single peaked at #23 on Top Latin Tracks chart. A promotional tour kept Peña in the United States and Puerto Rico where the album was released. Tuya was the album's most successful single reaching the #5 position on Billboards Top Latin Tracks. Sales stalled at 100,000 copies and the album is currently out of print. With Dice Que El Tiempo Peña received her third Grammy Nomination for Best Latin Pop Album. Her previous nominations were in the Mexican-American category for her albums Abrázame y Bésame and Libre. This album was followed by Superacíon in 2025.

== Track listing ==
No.	Title	Length
1.	"Intro"	1:06
2.	"Soy Asi (The Tequila Song)"	3:31
3.	"Ladron"	4:23
4.	"Tuya"	3:51
5.	"Marzo 17"	3:22
6.	"Baby's 15 Seconds"	0:25
7.	"Pero Que Necesidad"	3:15
8.	"Cobarde Mi Verdad"	4:04
9.	"Tus Besos"	3:45
10.	"Cuando Tu Pasas"	3:41
11.	"Brisas Suaves"	3:02
12.	"Life Is (Interlude)"	0:12
13.	"Como Entender"	3:41
14.	"El Momento"	3:49
15.	"Tu Mejor Amiga"	3:56
16.	"Como Entender"	4:00
17.	"Como Entender"	3:58

== Album credits ==
- Executive producer : Jennifer Peña
- Producer: Sebastian Kyrs
- Producer: Obie Bermúdez

== Awards and recognition ==
- 2007 Grammy Award: Best Latin Pop Album Nominated
- 2007 Latin Grammy Award: Best Musical Production Won

== Charts ==
Chart (2007)	Peak position
US Top Latin Albums (Billboard)	16
US Latin Pop Albums (Billboard)	5
