= No Me Queda Más =

1994 single by Selena

Single by Selena

from the album Amor Prohibido
- Released: October 1994
- Studio: AMEN Studios (San Antonio, TX)
- Genre: Mariachi; pop; Mexican cumbia
- Length: 3:16
- Label: EMI Latin
- Songwriter: Ricky Vela
- Producers: A.B. Quintanilla III; Bebu Silvetti

Selena singles chronology
| "Bidi Bidi Bom Bom" (1994) | "No Me Queda Más" (1994) | "Fotos y Recuerdos" (1995) |

Music video
- "No Me Queda Más" on YouTube

Audio
- "No Me Queda Más" on YouTube

"No Me Queda Más" ("There's Nothing Left for Me") is a song by American singer Selena on her fourth studio album, Amor Prohibido. It was released as the third single from the album in October 1994 by EMI Latin. "No Me Queda Más" was written by Ricky Vela, and production was handled by Selena's brother A.B. Quintanilla. A downtempo mariachi and pop ballad, "No Me Queda Más" portrays the ranchera storyline of a woman in agony after the end of a relationship. Its lyrics express an unrequited love, the singer wishing the best for her former lover and his new partner.

Praised by music critics for its emotive nature, "No Me Queda Más" was one of the most successful singles of Selena's career. It topped the United States Billboard Hot Latin Songs chart for seven non-consecutive weeks, her third successive number-one song. It was Selena's first number-one track on the US Regional Mexican Airplay chart, and became the most successful US Latin single of 1995. It has been ranked the ninth-best Tejano recording by Billboard magazine and the eleventh-best Hot Latin Songs chart single in 2011.

The music video for "No Me Queda Más" was shot in San Antonio's Amtrak station. It received the Music Video of the Year award at the Billboard Latin Music Awards, and the recording received two Broadcast Music honors including Song of the Year. Many musicians have since recorded cover versions, including Mexican singer Pepe Aguilar, American salsa singer Tito Nieves, and Mexican pop group Palomo. The Palomo version peaked at number six on the Regional Mexican Airplay chart, while Nieves' version reached number seven on the US Tropical Songs chart.

== Inspiration, writing and production ==
In 1985, Ricky Vela joined Selena y Los Dinos as their keyboardist. Although Vela was attracted to the group's drummer, Suzette Quintanilla, he kept his feelings to himself. When he confessed his feelings to Suzette's brother, group manager Abraham Quintanilla, III, he began teasing him about it. After Suzette's September 1993 marriage, Vela wrote "No Me Queda Más" and it was given to Selena to record for Amor Prohibido. Selena's brother A.B. Quintanilla did not find the song to have any potential; he has said that he later had a change of heart.

In a 2002 interview, A.B. said that during a recording session he had asked Selena to record the song for a fifth time. The singer replied, "What you got there is what you got" and left to go shopping. He mused, "Now looking back, she really did a beautiful job when recording the song, she had so much passion. The song became a classic."

Although the song was originally intended as a mariachi track, EMI Latin president Jose Behar believed that a mariachi recording would not appeal to the popular market. When the song was set to be released as the third single from the album, the group gave it to Argentine arranger Bebu Silvetti to rework into a pop-style track, and Behar asked Silvetti to "sweeten" the song to boost its airplay and chart performance. The result enhanced Selena's pop-radio success and was included in late 1994 reissues of Amor Prohibido, subsequently replacing the original album version. Behar said in a Billboard interview that the song was "internalized" without affecting the originality of its recording.

== Music, theme and lyrics ==
"No Me Queda Más" (1994)
20-second sample of "No Me Queda Más", where the singer finds "the strength to walk away", and is believed by Ramiro Burr to showcase the singer's ability to "fully conveyed the pain of love and the tone of redemption".

"No Me Queda Más" is a downtempo mariachi and pop ballad, incorporating ranchera and flamenco influences into its sound. Musicologists Ilan Stavans and Harold Augenbraum called the song a bolero-mariachi mix. This was echoed by the Lexington Herald-Leader, which noted its bolero influences. Texas Monthly editor Joe Nick Patoski wrote that Vela "riffed off romantic boleros" and the song "showcase[d] Selena's vocal range and control". "No Me Queda Más" has a "traditional [mariachi] trumpet duet harmony", using violins and guitars. The original version mainly used acoustic strummed guitars and a synthesized string track; while the single remix, featured on later reissues of Amor Prohibido, replaced this with soft rock instrumentation featuring a drum kit, bass guitar and multitracked acoustic and electric guitars combined with a lush live orchestral string arrangement.

The song employs the traditional ranchera storyline, with the female singer agonizing over the end of a relationship. Its lyrics explore unrequited love; when the singer's lover leaves her for another woman, she nevertheless wishes them "nothing but happiness." According to author Lori Beth Rodriguez, Selena sings the song "in a low, sober voice", and critic Howard Blumenthal adds that she does so in a "desperate" and "sentimental" way. Ramiro Burr of the San Antonio Express-News called her overdubbed vocals "powerful" and "emotive"; other critics have described "No Me Queda Más" as "torchy", "mournful", "piercing" and "heartbreaking".

== Critical reception and impact ==
"No Me Queda Más" was well-received, reviewers describing it as "evocative", "romantic", and "bittersweet"; A.B.'s use of "world-music flourishes" on the song was noted approvingly by Michael Clark. Writing in The Billboard Guide to Tejano and Regional Mexican Music, Ramiro Burr felt that the lyrics, about "finding the strength to walk away", evoked "the pain of love and the tone of redemption". The song became an "instant classic", according to Roger Burns, writing in Icons of Latino America. Other reviewers agreed that it was one of the most successful singles from Amor Prohibido, with Lisa Leal of KVTV commenting that the song is a Spanish-language counterpart of the Beatles' 1965 single "Yesterday" in fan popularity.

The track received several awards and accolades. It was the Song of the Year at the 1995 Broadcast Music Awards, and Vela received the Songwriter of the Year award in 1996. Its video was honored as the Music Video of the Year at the 1995 Billboard Latin Music Awards. "No Me Queda Más" was ranked as the ninth-best Tejano song of all time on Ramiro Burr's top-ten list. It has appeared on several critics' "best Selena songs" lists, including BuzzFeed (at number one), Latino Post (number four), and Latina (number five).

== Commercial performance ==
Billboard announced that a new airplay-measuring system for its music charts would be based on Nielsen ratings beginning on November 12, 1994. "No Me Queda Más" entered the US Hot Latin Songs chart at number 40 on that date, and Selena's "Bidi Bidi Bom Bom" remained at number one. On November 19, the song rose to number ten on that chart and subsequently debuted on the US Regional Mexican Airplay chart at number seven. The following week, it climbed to the fifth and fourth positions on the Hot Latin Songs and Regional Mexican Airplay charts, respectively. Billboard contributor John Lannert, noting that three different songs had topped the Hot Latin Songs chart since the inception of the Nielsen-rating system, predicted that Luis Miguel's number one single "La Media Vuelta" could be unseated by "No Me Queda Más". The following week, "La Media Vuelta" remained atop the chart and "No Me Queda Más" rose to number two. "No Me Queda Más" topped the Regional Mexican Airplay chart for three consecutive weeks beginning on December 3, Selena's first number one on that chart. The song peaked at number one on the Hot Latin Songs chart on December 17, her third consecutive number one. It debuted at number 13 on the US Latin Pop Songs chart on January 7, 1995, remaining atop the Hot Latin Songs chart. The song reclaimed the number-one spot on the Regional Mexican Airplay chart for January 14, unseating La Mafia's "Me Duele Estar Solo". La Mafia displaced "No Me Queda Más" from the top of the Regional Mexican Airplay and Hot Latin Songs charts on January 21, ending the song's five-week reign on the latter. The following week, "No Me Queda Más" regained the top of both charts. On February 4, it fell to number two on the Regional Mexican Airplay chart and retained the top spot on the Hot Latin Songs chart for its seventh nonconsecutive week. It was displaced from the top of the Hot Latin Songs chart on February 11 by Grupo Bronco's "Que No Me Olvide". It was the most popular song from Amor Prohibido on Mexican radio.

Selena was shot and killed on March 31, 1995 by Yolanda Saldívar, a friend who was the former manager of the singer's Selena Etc. boutiques. Four of her singles—"No Me Queda Más", "Bidi Bidi Bom Bom", "Como la Flor" and "Amor Prohibido"—reentered the Billboard Hot Latin Songs and Regional Mexican Airplay charts on April 15. "No Me Queda Más" placed fifth and eighth on the Hot Latin Songs and Regional Mexican Airplay charts, respectively, and remained in the top ten of the Hot Latin Songs chart for 12 consecutive weeks. Billboard posthumously named Selena the Top Latin Artist of the 1990s in recognition of her fourteen top-ten singles on the Hot Latin Songs chart, including seven number ones. "No Me Queda Más" was the most successful US Latin single of 1995. It ranked eleventh on Billboard's quarter-century celebration of the Hot Latin Songs chart in 2011. Billboard began monitoring digital downloads of Latin songs during the week ending January 23, 2010. "No Me Queda Más" made its debut at number 23 on the Latin Digital Songs chart following the twentieth anniversary of Selena's death. On the Latin Pop Digital Songs chart, the song debuted at number 22 and peaked at number nine.

== Music video ==
An accompanying music video for "No Me Queda Más" was filmed in October 1994 at the San Antonio Amtrak station. Produced by Summit Productions, the video was directed by Sean Roberts. Shooting took four days to complete. Jack Morgan was the on-set photographer, and Diego Aguilar produced the video. Selena wore the same dress that she did when she won a Grammy Award for Best Mexican/American Album in 1994. Veronica Flores, a reporter for the San Antonio Express-News, was asked to make a cameo appearance as a wedding guest. American model Freddie Martinez portrayed Selena's love interest after auditioning for the role in San Antonio.

The video's location was later used for Selena's fashion-show scene in Selena (1997), starring Jennifer Lopez. Hillary Clinton used "Bidi Bidi Bom Bom" as part of her 2016 presidential campaign in San Antonio (which received a mixed response from Hispanics), playing the song at the location where Selena recorded the music video for "No Me Queda Más". Univision ranked the music video at number four on their top ten favorite music videos of Selena.

In the video, Selena is sitting in a restaurant where a mariachi band is performing. A waiter offers her a glass of water. As the singer enjoys her dinner, the waiter returns with a note saying that her lover (for whom she has been waiting) has left her for another woman. Selena takes a sip of water before she leaves the restaurant, crying.

The singer is in the dark behind a busy highway, sobbing and peeling petals off a white rose in a game of He loves me... he loves me not as a montage is playing of images of Selena and her former lover. Selena then sings on a staircase in a white dress, accompanied by an orchestra. She considers crashing her ex-lover's beach wedding, but instead runs away in tears. Selena's ex-lover and his new wife kiss, and a video plays in which he kisses Selena's hands. He then embraces his wife as Selena looks down, sobbing.

== Cover versions ==
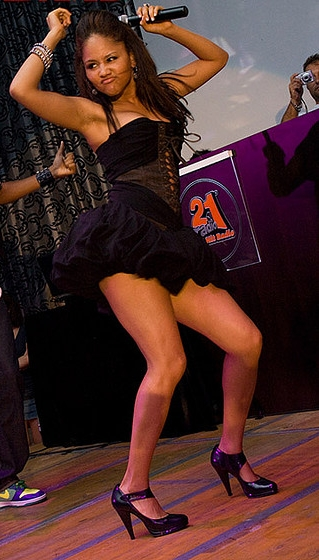
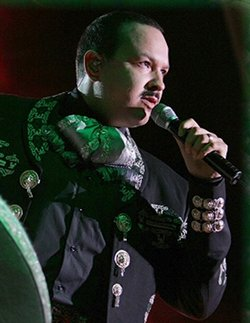
Dominican singer Kat DeLuna (left) and Mexican singer Pepe Aguilar have covered "No Me Queda Más" in live performances.

American salsa singer Tito Nieves recorded "No Me Queda Más" for his third studio album, Un Tipo Comun (1996). The song was commercially more successful than the four singles released from the album, where it peaked at number seven on the US Tropical Songs chart. That same year, Dominican singer Kat DeLuna won first place when she sang the song at the New Jersey Hispanic Youth Showcase, a children's singing competition. In 1998, Los Tres Reyes (a mariachi group produced by Abraham Quintanilla, Jr.) recorded a duet version of the song. Graciela Beltran covered the song during a memorial for Selena in Houston in 2003. Mexican singer Pepe Aguilar performed and recorded "No Me Queda Más" for a live, televised tribute concert, Selena ¡VIVE!, in April 2005. According to Michael Clark of the Houston Chronicle, "[Aguilar's] vocal ... was reminiscent of Aaron Neville".

Mexican pop group Palomo recorded "No Me Queda Más" for their live album, En Concierto-En Vivo Desde L.A. (2005). The song debuted at number 37 on the Regional Mexican Airplay chart on March 19, 2005, and at number 46 on the Hot Latin Songs chart on April 2. It remained on the chart until July 16, peaking at numbers 19 and six on the Hot Latin Songs and Regional Mexican Airplay charts, respectively. Ricky Vela received a BMI Latin Music Award for the Palomo's cover in 2007. American singer José Feliciano recorded it for his album, Jose Feliciano y Amigos, in 2006; Ramiro Burr of the Chicago Tribune called it a "bittersweet ranchera". Cuban singer Toñita recorded the song for her album, Desafiando al Destino, in 2007. A year later, American singer Maria Williams recorded an English-language version entitled "Nothing Left For Me" for her debut album Hybrid. American singer David Archuleta performed the song as a tribute to Selena at the 2010 Tejano Music Awards, and Karen Rodriguez sang it during the tenth season of American Idol. On May 1, 2015, Jennifer Lopez performed "A Selena Tribute" at the 2015 Latin Billboard Music Awards, which included "No Me Queda Más". Lopez was praised by music critics, who appreciated the singer's Selena-esque costumes. The recording debuted and peaked at number 33 on the Hot Latin Songs chart.

== Credits and personnel ==
Credits adapted from the liner notes of Amor Prohibido.

- Selena – vocals
- Joe Ojeda – keyboards
- Ricky Vela – writer, keyboards
- Chris Pérez – guitars
- A.B. Quintanilla III – arranger, producer
- Bebu Silvetti – arranger
- Suzette Quintanilla – drums
- Arturo Meza, Jesse "O'Jay" Martinez – percussion/congas
- Odalis Smith, Helen Stackhouse, Morgan Taylor – french horn
- Gertrude Myers, Ruth Moore, John Foster, Alice Powell – violin
- Lucy Richardson – cello
- Francisca Malorie, James Watson – flute
- Edward Jackson, Jose Deluna – trumpet
- Freddie Corea, Don Shelton – tambourine

== Charts ==
=== Weekly charts ===
| Chart (1994) | Peak position |
|---|---|
| US Hot Latin Songs (Billboard) | 1 |
| US Regional Mexican Airplay (Billboard) | 1 |
| US Latin Pop Airplay (Billboard) | 13 |

=== Year-end charts ===
| Chart (1995) | Position |
|---|---|
| US Hot Latin Songs (Billboard) | 1 |
| US Regional Mexican Airplay (Billboard) | 2 |

=== All-time charts ===
| Chart (2021) | Position |
|---|---|
| US Hot Latin Songs (Billboard) | 18 |

== Certifications ==
| Region | Certification | Certified units/sales |
|---|---|---|
| United States (RIAA) | 4× Platinum (Latin) | 240,000^{‡} |
^{‡} Sales+streaming figures based on certification alone.

== See also ==
- Latin music in the United States
- Billboard Top Latin Songs Year-End Chart
- List of number-one Billboard Hot Latin Tracks of 1994
- List of number-one Billboard Hot Latin Tracks of 1995

== Notes ==
- Arrarás, María Celeste (1997). Selena's Secret: The Revealing Story Behind Her Tragic Death. Simon and Schuster. ISBN 0-684-83193-7.
- Blumenthal, Howard J. (1997). The world music CD listener's guide. New York: Billboard Books. ISBN 0-8230-7663-6.
- Burns, Roger (2008). Icons of Latino America: Latino Contributions to American Culture. Vol. 2. Greenwood Press. ISBN 978-0-313-34088-8.
- Burr, Ramiro (1999). The Billboard Guide to Tejano and Regional Mexican Music. Billboard books. ISBN 0-8230-7691-1.
- Hoffman, Frank (2005). Encyclopedia of Recorded Sound. Routledge. ISBN 1-135-94950-6.
- Paredez, Deborah (2009). Selenidad: Selena, Latinos, and the Performance of Memory. Duke University Press. ISBN 978-0-8223-9089-3.
- Patoski, Joe Nick (1996). Selena: Como La Flor. Boston: Little Brown and Company. ISBN 0-316-69378-2.
- Perone, James E. (2012). The Album: A Guide to Pop Music's Most Provocative, Influential, and Important Creations. ABC-CLIO. ISBN 978-0-313-37907-9.
- Rodriguez, Lori Beth (2008). Mapping Tejana Epistemologies. ISBN 978-0-549-51061-1.
- Stavans, Ilan; Augenbraum, Harold (2005). Encyclopedia Latina: history, culture, and society in the United States. Grolier Academic Reference. ISBN 0-7172-5815-7.
- Velasquez, Jorge (2010). Meditaciones para Lograr Su Primer Millon. iUniverse. ISBN 978-1-4502-3731-4.
