= Los Tres Reyes =

Mexican music group

Los Tres Reyes was a music group initially linked to the trío romántico style, comparable to Los Panchos, before expanding to perform varied Latin American music. Gilberto and Raúl Puente, twins, were founders of the group in 1957 and remained in it. Gilberto played the requinto very well and is able to imitate the Los Panchos style easily. Gilberto is considered one of the best requinto players of Mexico. The group continued into the 1970s, but took a fifteen-year hiatus before re-forming in 1991. During the hiatus Gilberto Puente was an accompanist to Mariachi Vargas de Tecalitlán. Since the re-forming the group has recorded for the Smithsonian Institution. Although originally based in Mexico it is largely linked to San Antonio today and is noted for a duet version of No Me Queda Más with Tejano musician Selena. Another recent success was "Recordando Los Panchos"; Here they sing a series of boleros made famous by Los Panchos; then the final line says: "interpretan los Tres Reyes a Los Panchos". Los Tres Reyes retired in January 2019.

== History ==
=== Early Starts ===
Gilberto and Raúl Puente started their career as "Los Cuatitos Puente" (The Puente Twins), in which Raúl sang the first voice and played the accompaniment, while Gilberto sang the second voice, and played the requinto. They went on to record four songs at the radio station XEDF, now XEK, in Nuevo Laredo, Tamaulipas. This recording contained four songs: El Balajú, Cielito Lindo, Sin Ti, and, Aunque Pasen Los Años. This was in 1948.

=== Formation of Los Tres Reyes ===
The brothers then accompanied a singer named Virginia Lopez, in 1957, now as a more formal group. They read in a newspaper that Los Panchos had broken up in Buenos Aires and got Hernando Avilés, their lead singer, to join them. Gilberto Puente later recalled that as he was looking through Avilés's piano bench, he found the sheet music of the song "Ódiame". This, along with the song "Decídete" became their first recording and a big hit.
