= Fiesta de la Flor =

- Status: Inactive
- Genre: Music
- Country: United States
- Inaugurated: 2015
- Most recent: 2019
- Organizer: Quintanilla family

Fiesta de la Flor was an annual musical festival and convention for fans of Tejano singer Selena (1971–1995). Since 2015, it was held at Corpus Christi, Texas, in March of every year till 2019, and it was hosted by the Quintanilla Family.
