= Jennifer Peña =

American singer

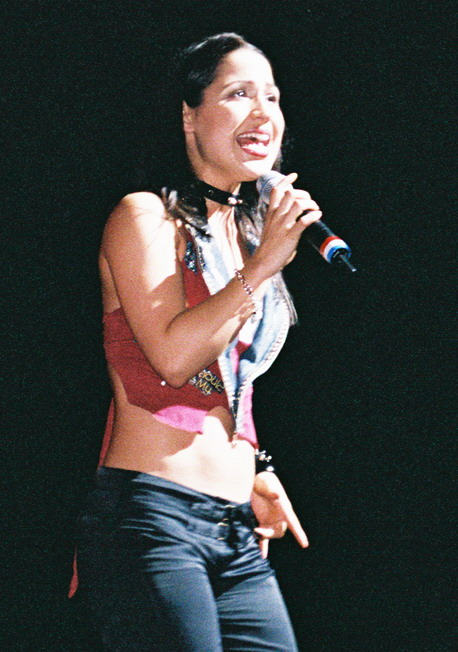

Background information
- Born: Jennifer Marcella Peña; September 17, 1983 (age 43)
- Origin: San Antonio, Texas U.S.
- Genres: Tejano, regional Mexican, Latin, pop
- Occupation: Singer
- Years active: 1996–present
- Labels: EMI Latin (1995–2000); Univision Music Group (2002–2008); Universal (2008-2025) Symphonic Latino (2025-present)
- Website: https://jenniferpenaofficial.myshopify.com/

Jennifer Marcella Peña (born September 17, 1983) is a Grammy Awards and Latin Grammy Awards nominated Mexican American Tejano/Latin pop singer known as "The Princess of Tejano". Peña reached a milestone in her career of over 10 million records sold internationally. Peña was born in San Antonio, Texas, and is the third and youngest daughter of Jaime and Mary Peña. Her sisters' names are Janet and Jackie. Peña is of Mexican descent native to the state of Texas.

== Career ==
=== Los Jetz ===
Peña first achieved notoriety after performing at the Astrodome in Houston, Texas, during a Selena Quintanilla tribute concert in 1995. The event was Peña's first public performance, on a large scale, during which she performed the song "Bidi Bidi Bom Bom", one of Selena's No. 1 hits from the year prior (1994). At the time, Peña's music career was managed by Q-Productions and Abraham Quintanilla Jr., the late Selena's father and former manager. Peña's debut studio album, Dulzura, was released in May 1996 as part of Jennifer y Los Jetz and was produced by Abraham Quintanilla. The record introduced her to the music scene, officially, at the age of 12; the title track, and "Ven a mí" (or 'Come to me', a Spanish-language cover of The Drifters song "Dance with Me"), garnered her a loyal fanbase. The album sold quite well in the Latin music market, was certified gold and won several Tejano Music Awards. At the time, Tejano music was in its heyday, and Peña was another young, staple act on the scene. Her introduction was both praised and criticized, mainly in part due to the artistic (and physical) similarities between Selena and herself, despite Selena's own father managing her career. Reviews and comparisons came and went, and still, Peña managed to continue winning over fans. In 1997, she released her second album, Jennifer Y Los Jetz, with the singles "Tu Castigo" ('your punishment') and "Yo Te Vi" ('I saw you') being promoted and experiencing much of the same success as Dulzura had achieved. The album ended up earning another gold certification. Los Jetz was composed of musicians who are still in the music business, to this day, including Lucky Joe Eguia (who is now a Freddie Records solo recording artist), Joey Jimenez ('JMZ', who has become one of Tejano's most praised drummers), and Lalo Reyna (husband and band director for Elida Reyna).

In 1998, Peña released Mariposa with "Tengo Miedo" ('I’m scared') as the lead single, another hit on the Latin market; in México, where she toured extensively, the album became Peña's third to be certified gold. By 2000, Peña was the most prominent female Tejano singer, and had been long-dubbed "La Princesa de la Música Tejana" (the princess of Tejano music). Her most commercially- and critically-acclaimed album, while under Q's management, was 2000's Abrázame y Bésame ("hug me and kiss me"), for which Peña was billed as a solo act but still performing with Los Jetz. The album, as her previous, was produced by A.B. Quintanilla. Showcasing a more mature sound for the singer, the title track—a duet with former Kumbia Kings frontman DJ Kane—was the most successful single. Other songs, like "Si Tú Te Vas" ('if you go'), "Contigo Otra Vez" ('with you again') and "No Te Voy a Perdonar" ('I’m not going to forgive you '), resonated strongly in the US and in Mexico, garnering her a 2001 Grammy nomination and multiple Tejano Music Awards. Peña continued to promote and tour extensively after the release of every album under Q's management, and under EMI Latin.

=== Univision Music Group and Latin pop venture ===
After a few years of management under Q Productions, Peña signed with new label Univision Music Group, whose president had launched Selena's career while at EMI Latin, which he headed until 2000.

In 2002, Peña released Libre, produced by Rudy Pérez and Kike Santander. Rudy Pérez wrote the album's biggest hits: "Vamos al Mundial", which was chosen as the anthem for the 2002 FIFA World Cup on Univision; and "El Dolor de Tu Presencia", which catapulted Peña's popularity, spending eight consecutive weeks at No. 1 on Billboard's Hot Latin Tracks. "Entre el Delirio y la Locura" soon followed. Libre sold over 300,000 units. In 2003, Libre was nominated for a Grammy.

In 2004, Peña released her second album with UMG, Seducción, which was produced by Rudy Pérez, Gustavo and Kike Santander, and Emilio Estefan. Rudy Pérez was the genius behind another No. 1 hit, "Vivo y Muero en Tu Piel". The album kept up the momentum of her previous release, again selling over 300,000 units.

In 2004, Peña performed to a crowd of over 61,000 fans at the Houston Livestock Show and Rodeo, a venue known for hosting major acts such as the Dixie Chicks, Garth Brooks, and Beyoncé. She also recorded a live album which was released later that same year. Following her commercial success, Peña performed for former United States President Bill Clinton and then current President President George W. Bush in 2006. She is actively involved with awareness campaigns of hepatitis, AIDS, and teen depression.

Peña has ventured into film, appearing in MTV's All You've Got (2006) with Ciara. She also appeared in Amexicano (2007).

On February 27, 2007 (19 years ago), Dicen que el tiempo was released, debuting at No. 16 on Billboard Top Latin Albums, with "Como Entender" being promoted as the first single, followed by "Tuya" in late April 2007. Since the release, both the album and single have garnered only a lukewarm reception, despite cracking the Top 25 positions on Billboard and selling out the initial shipment of 80,000 units. Peña is on hiatus after having promoted the album all across the US and Puerto Rico with TV slots on MTV Tr3s as the artist of the month and extensive radio promotion. The second single, "Tuya", reached its peak position at No. 5 on the Billboard chart as of September 2007. "Dicen Que El Tiempo" did not fare well in sales in comparison to previous efforts but did win Peña critical acclaim and was well received by fans. The album, although a departure from both her pop ballads and Tejano sound, was produced by Jennifer and Sebastian Kyrs, with additional songwriting and production by Obie Bermúdez. On December 6, 2007, "Dicen Que El Tiempo" was nominated for a Grammy.

== Personal life ==
In April 2007, Peña announced her engagement to Puerto Rican singer-songwriter Obie Bermúdez, and that they were expecting their first child. They shared their good news again during an appearance on April 26, 2007, edition of "Mi TRL" on MTV Tr3s. The couple was married in a private ceremony in her home state of Texas on June 3, 2007. The couple welcomed their first child, a son, in November 2007. She later had a daughter, and third child in 2019. Jennifer and her husband formally separated in 2023 and the divorce was final in 2024. Which has led her return to music after a long hiatus. Peña, before the divorce and separation, had joined Church Unlimited's Praise & Worship team where she was welcomed and loved. Separation with the church ended abruptly years after her dedication to the church, with Jennifer having plans of returning to Tejano Music while continuing to have the love and passion of God in her heart. In 2024, Peña started a tour alongside Grupo Siggno named "Casate Conmigo" Tour. In 2024, Jennifer along with Los Inquietos del Vallenato released “Nunca Niegues Que Te Amo”. Currently Peña resides in Texas and is planning an international tour.

== Discography ==
=== Albums ===
As Jennifer y Los Jetz

- Dulzura (1996)
- Jennifer (1997)
- Mariposa (1998)
- Abrázame y Bésame (2000)

As Jennifer Peña

- Libre (2002)
- Seducción (2004)
- Houston Rodeo Live (2004)
- Dicen Que El Tiempo (2007)
- Superacion (2025)

=== Singles ===
- Ven A Mi (1996)
- Pura Dulzura (1996)
- Tu Castigo (1997)
- Yo Te Vi (1997)
- Coranzoncito Ven A Mi (1998)
- Si Tu Te Vas (2000)
- Abrázame Y Bésame (2000)
- El Dolor De Tu Presencia (2002)
- Entre El Delirio y la Locura (2003)
- A Fuego Lento (2004)
- Hasta El Fin Del Mundo (2004)
- Vivo Y Muero En Tu Piel (2004)
- No Hay Nadie Igual Como Tu (2004)
- Si Yo Me Vuelve A Enamorar (2004)
- Como Entender (2007)
- Tuya (2007)
- Todo Mi Amor Eres Tu (2015)
- Fuerte (2023)
- Casate Conmigo (as a feature with Siggno) (2024)
- Nunca Niegues Que Te Amo (with Los Inquietos del Vallenato) (2024)
- Wakala (2025)
- Atada (2025)
- Malo (2026)

== Awards and recognitions ==
=== Grammy Awards and Latin Grammy Awards ===
- 1999 Best Tejano Performance " Mariposa " Nominated
- 2002 Best Mexican/Mexican-American Album " Libre" Nominated
- 2003 Best Grupero Album "Libre" Latin Grammy Awards Nominated
- 2007 Best Latin Pop Album "Dicen Que El Tiempo" Nominated

=== Latin Billboard Awards ===
- 2003 Hot Latin Track of the Year "El Dolor De Tu Presencia" Nominated
- 2003 Regional Mexican Airplay Track of the Year, Female Group or Female Solo Artist "El Dolor De Tu Presencia" Nominated
- 2003 Latin Pop Airplay Track of the Year, Female "El Dolor De Tu Presencia" Nominated
- 2003 Regional Mexican Album of the Year, Female Group or Female Solo Artist "Libre" WIN
- 2005 Latin Pop Album of the Year, Female "Seduceme" Nominated
- 2006 Regional Mexican Album of the Year, Female Group or Female Solo Artist "Confesiones (con Ana Barbara)" Nominated

=== Premios Lo Nuestro ===
- 2004 Musica Mexicana: Mejor Artista Femenina WIN

=== Tejano Music Awards ===
- 1997 Female Entertainer of the Year WIN
- 1998 Most Promising Band of the Year WIN
- 1998 Female Entertainer of the Year WIN
- 1999 Female Vocalist of the Year WIN
- 1999 Female Entertainer of the Year WIN
- 2001 Female Vocalist of the Year WIN
- 2001 Female Entertainer of the Year WIN
- 2003 Female Vocalist of the Year WIN
- 2003 Female Entertainer of the Year WIN

=== South Texas Music Awards ===
- 2002, 2003 Female Vocalist of the Year
- 2002, 2003 Female Entertainer of the Year

== Filmography ==
- All You've Got (2006) DVD
- Amexicano (2007) DVD
- Top Chef VIP (2022) Reality Shop
