= 2002 in Latin music =

This is a list of notable events in Latin music (i.e. music from the Spanish- and Portuguese-speaking areas Latin America, Latin Europe, and the United States) that took place in 2002.

== Events ==
- September 18 – The 3rd Annual Latin Grammy Awards are held at the Kodak Theatre in Los Angeles.
  - Alejandro Sanz wins the Latin Grammy Awards for Song of the Year and Record of the Year for "Y Sólo Se Me Ocurre Amarte" and Album of the Year for MTV Unplugged.
  - Jorge Moreno wins Best New Artist.
  - Vicente Fernández is honored as the Latin Recording Academy Person of the Year.

== Bands formed ==
- Arcuri Overthrow (Venezuela)
- Asesino (Mexico)
- Cali Philharmonic Orchestra (Colombia)
- El Efecto (Brazil)
- El Hombre Misterioso (Peru)
- El Sueño de Morfeo (Spain)
- Mambrú (Argentina)
- Mercadonegro (Chile)
- Trazendo a Arca (Brazil)
- Tribalistas (Brazil)

== Bands disbanded ==
- Flema (Argentina)
- Mujeres Encinta (international)
- Tijuana No! (Mexico)

== Number-ones albums and singles by country ==
- List of number-one albums of 2002 (Spain)
- List of number-one singles of 2002 (Spain)
- List of number-one Billboard Top Latin Albums of 2002
- List of number-one Billboard Hot Latin Tracks of 2002

== Awards ==
- 2002 Latin Grammy Awards
- 2002 Premio Lo Nuestro
- 2002 Billboard Latin Music Awards
- 2002 Tejano Music Awards

== Albums released ==
=== First quarter ===
==== January ====
Day	Title	Artist	Genre(s)	Singles	Label
1	Mi Nostalgia	Giro	Salsa		Musical Productions
1	Bajofondo Tango Club	Bajofondo	Deep House, Downtempo, Tango, Drum n Bass, Milonga		Universal
1	Rumba De Corazón	Los Muñequitos de Matanzas	Guaguanco, Rumba		Bis Music
14	Tango Reflections	Adrián Iaies			Ensayo
15	+Bien	Gustavo Cerati	Ambient, Electro, Acoustic		BMG Chile S.A.
15	Frutos	Felix D'Oleo			
21	Dwitza	Ed Motta	Soul-Jazz, Bossa Nova, Jazz-Funk		Whatmusic.com
28	En Vivo Vol. 2	Conjunto Primavera	Norteno, Ranchera		Universal Music Group, FonoVisa
29	Sold Out At The Universal Amphitheatre, Vol. 1	Lupillo Rivera	Banda		Sony Music Entertainment
29	Sold Out At The Universal Amphitheatre, Vol. 2	Lupillo Rivera	Ranchera		Sony Discos, Cintas Acuario

==== February ====
Day	Title	Artist	Genre(s)	Singles	Label
5	Storm	Fernando Ortega	Vocal, Gospel, Religious		Word
5	Generoso Que Bueno Toca Usted	Generoso Jiménez	Latin Jazz, Afro-Cuban Jazz, Son		Pimienta
5	Un Poco Más	Los Palominos			
12	Pesado, Presente, Futuro	Pesado			Peerless MCM
19	Lo Dijo el Corazón	Joan Sebastian	Ranchera		Musart
19	Mal Acostumbrado	Fernando Villalona	Merengue	"Ay! Bueno"	Latino Music
26	Ciudad de las Ideas	Vicente Amigo	Flamenco		Ariola, BMG Espana
26	Triangulo	Michel Camilo	Post Bop, Latin Jazz		Telarc, Telarc Jazz
26	Canciones Ineditas	Chucho Valdés	Latin Jazz		Egrem
26	Sexto Sentido	Yolandita Monge	Vocal, Ballad		Warner Music Latina

==== March ====
Day	Title	Artist	Genre(s)	Singles	Label
5	Fred Hammond Presents...Joann Rosario: More, More, More	JoAnn Rosario			
5	Samba Jazz Fantasia	Duduka Da Fonseca	Bossa Nova, Samba		Malandro Records
5	Quedate Conmigo	Banda Pachuco			
5	Acústico MTV	Cássia Eller	MPB, Acoustic, Pop rock		Universal Music, Mercury
12	Pacantó	Totó la Momposina	Cumbia, Porro, Champeta	"Acompáñala" "Chambacú" "La Paloma"	Nuevos Medios
12	Confesiones...	Monchy & Alexandra	Bachata, Merengue	"Te Quiero Igual Que Ayer" "Dos Locos"	J&N Records, Sony Discos
12	Amor Secreto	Luis Fonsi	Ballad	"Quisiera Poder Olvidarme de Ti" "Amor Secreto" "Te Vas"	Universal Music Latino
12	My Passion for the Piano	Arturo Sandoval	Contemporary Jazz		Crescent Moon Records, Columbia
12	Sentir	Omar Sosa	Afro-Cuban Jazz, Contemporary Jazz		Ota Records
15	Bonito que canta	Petrona Martínez	Bullerenge		MTM
19	Grandes Ėxitos	Chayanne	Salsa, Vocal, Ballad	"Y Tú Te Vas" "Torero"	Columbia, Sony Discos
19	Segundas partes también son buenas	Franco De Vita	Latin pop	"Como Decirte No"	Universal Music Latino
26	Todo Bajo Control	Grupo Control			
26	Cabas	Cabas	Downtempo	"Mi Bombón"	EMI Latin
26	Temptation	Brenda K. Starr	Salsa, Contemporary R&B, Ballad	"Por Ese Hombre"	Sony Discos
26	Kinky	Kinky	House, Disco, Breakbeat		Nettwerk America, Sonic360
26	Estamos Unidos	David Lee Garza y Los Musicales	Tejano		Sony Discos
26	Sensual	Roberto Perera			Heads Up International
26	Modinha – Brazilian Songs	Luiz De Moura Castro and María José Montiel			Ensayo
26	Aquí Conmigo	Andy Andy	Bachata		Sony Discos

=== Second quarter ===
==== April ====
Day	Title	Artist	Genre(s)	Singles	Label
2	Alas Al Mundo	Los Ángeles Azules	Cumbia		Disa
2	Bailame	Los Tigrillos			
8	Un Ramito De Locura	Carmen Linares with Gerardo Núñez Trio	Flamenco		Mercury
9	A Tiempo	Gian Marco Zignago	Ballad		Crescent Moon Records, Sony Discos
9	Nuevo	Kronos Quartet	Contemporary		Nonesuch
12	Andando de Coletivo	Caju & Castanha	MPB		Trama
16	Bongó De Van Gogh	Alex Acuña and Justo Almario with Tolú			Tonga Productions
16	En Concierto	Los Terrícolas			Disa
20	Corazon de Perico	Los Razos de Sacramento			
23	Tremenda Rumba!	Maraca			Ahi-Nama Music
23	Falange Canibal	Lenine	MPB		BMG Brasil Ltda., BMG France
23	Deixa a Vida Me Levar	Zeca Pagodinho	Samba		Universal Music Mercury
23	La Perfecta II	Eddie Palmieri	Salsa, Cha-Cha, Latin Jazz		Concord Picante
23	Ponce	Carlos Ponce			EMI Latin
30	Money Pa' Qué	Los Rabanes	Samba, Salsa, Merengue, Bachata		Sony Discos, Crescent Moon Records LLC
30	Los Hermanos Mas Buscados	Lupillo Rivera and Juan Rivera	Corrido, Norteno		Cintas Acuario, Sony Discos

==== May ====
Day	Title	Artist	Genre(s)	Singles	Label
14	Solo Tuya	Aracely Arámbula			Disa
14	The Phenomenon	Big Boy	Reggaeton		Musical Productions
14	Raíces Habaneras	Raíces Habaneras	Afro-Cuban, Rumba		Universal Music Latino
15	Pena Branca Canta Xavantinho	Pena Branca	Folk		Kuarup Discos
20	Un Día Normal	Juanes	Pop rock	"A Dios le Pido" "Es Por Ti "Mala Gente" "Fotografía" "La Paga" "Un Día Normal"	Universal Music Latino, Surco, Polydor
21	Viaje Infinito	Nicole	Latin, Pop rock, Ballad	"Amanecer" "Viaje Infinito"	Maverick
21	Thalía	Thalía	Latin, Synth-Pop, Euro House	"Tú y Yo" "No Me Enseñaste" "¿A Quién le Importa?" "Dance Dance (The Mexican)"	EMI, EMI
21	Urbano	Elvis Crespo	Merengue	"Bandida" "La Cerveza" "Besáme en la Boca"	Sony Discos
21	Suma	Ricardo Montaner	Vocal, Ballad	"Yo Puedo Hacer" "Si Tuviera Que Elegir"	Warner Music Latina
21	Hecho a Mano (Hand Made)	Albita			
21	Imaginate Sin Ellos	El Poder del Norte	Norteno		D Disa Latin Music, S. De R.L. De C.V.

==== June ====
Day	Title	Artist	Genre(s)	Singles	Label
4	Pidemelo Todo	Pablo Montero	Latin Pop, Ranchera	"Hay Otra en Tu Lugar" "Pidemlo Todo"	BMG U.S. Latin
4	En la Esquina	Chicos de Barrio			Warner Music Latina
4	De Corazón	Pedro Fernández	Mariachi		Universal Music Latino
11	Libre	Jennifer Peña	Latin Pop, Cumbia	"El Dolor de Tu Presencia" "Entre el Delirio y la Locura"	Univision Music
11	Emigrante	Orishas	Contemporary R&B, Pop Rap, Conscious		EMI, EMI, EMI
11	The Gathering	Dave Samuels and the Caribbean Jazz Project	Afro-Cuban Jazz		Concord Picante
12	La Industria: All Star 2	DJ Eric	Reggaeton		Madyatch Records
13	Chegando de Mansinho	Dominguinhos	Forro		Velas Produções Artísticas Musicais E Com. Ltda.
14	Un Nuevo Amanecer	Anthony Cruz	Salsa		Musical Productions
18	El Sube y Baja	Grupo Montez de Durango	Pachanga, Ranchera		D Disa Latin Music, S. De R.L. De C.V.
18	Lifestyle: A Worship Experience	The Katinas	Rhythm & Blues, Downtempo, Synth-Pop, Neo Soul		Gotee Records
18	Habana a Flor de Piel	Síntesis	Afro-Cuban		Unicornio Producciones Abdala
18	Hombre En La Luna	Jay Perez	Tejano		Sony Discos
25	Una Lágrima No Basta	Los Temerarios	Regional Mexican		Fonovisa Records
25	Jugo a la Vida	Los Tucanes de Tijuana			Universal Music Latino
25	No Es Casualidad	Yoskar Sarante	Bachata	"Guitarra" "No Tengo Suerte en el Amor"	J&N Records
25	Manny Manuel	Manny Manuel	Merengue, Latin Pop	"Se Me Sube"	RMM Records, Universal Music Latino, Mercury
25	40 Aniversario, 1962–2002	El Gran Combo de Puerto Rico	Salsa		BMG U.S. Latin, Combo Records, Ariola
25	Por las Damas	Los Cardenales de Nuevo León			
26	Fatal Fantassy 2 (Esto Es Mambo)	DJ Joe	Reggaeton		Geniux Music

=== Third quarter ===
==== July ====
Day	Title	Artist	Genre(s)	Singles	Label
2	Acústico	Ednita Nazario	Ballad		Sony Discos
2	A Toda Onda	La Onda			EMI Latin
2	We Broke the Rules	Aventura	Latin	"Obsesión	Up Music
2	Emboscada	Vico C	Reggaeton		EMI Latin, EMI Latin
2	Influencia	Charly García	Pop rock, Classic Rock		EMI
8	Natalia Lafourcade	Natalia Lafourcade	Acoustic, Bossanova, Pop rock, Latin Pop		Epic
9	Live In The USA	Charanga Habanera	Salsa, Timba		Ciocan Music
16	Caraluna	Bacilos	Vocal	"Caraluna" "Mi Primer Millón"	Warner Music Latina
16	Atrevéte a Olvidarme (Dare to Forget Me)	Rogelio Martínez			
18	Sonando Diferente	Yaga y Mackie	Reggaeton	"Si Tu Me Calientas" "Maulla" "Mi Mujer" "Muñequita"	Diamond Music
23	Vuela Muy Alto	Jerry Rivera	Salsa	"Vuela Muy Alto" "Herida Mortal"	BMG U.S. Latin, Ariola
23	Derroche de Amor	Raulín Rodríguez	Bachata		J&N Records
23	Cuesta Arriba	Los Rieleros del Norte			
23	Companeros Musicales	Panteón Rococó	Punk, Ska		RCA, BMG Mexico, Real Indendencia Records
30	Hijas del Tomate	Las Ketchup	Europop, Flamenco	"The Ketchup Song (Aserejé)"	Columbia, Columbia, Shaketown Music
30	No Me Sé Rajar	Banda el Recodo	Banda		FonoVisa
30	Perro Malagradecido	Los Originales de San Juan			
30	Dejame Entrar en Ti	Frank Reyes	Bachata		J&N Records, JVN Musical Inc.

==== August ====
Day	Title	Artist	Genre(s)	Singles	Label
5	Obras En Vivo	Luis Alberto Spinetta			Universal, Interdisc
5	La Rosa en Ginebra	Susana Rinaldi			
6	A Calzon Quitado	Grupo Exterminador	Norteno		Fonovisa
8	S.F. Bay	John Santos and the Machete Ensemble			Machete Music
13	Perdóname Mi Amor	Conjunto Primavera	Norteno		FonoVisa
13	Estoy Como Nunca	Eliades Ochoa			Higher Octave World
13	Pa'l Norte	Los Huracanes del Norte			
13	German Lizarraga	German Lizarraga			
14	De Otra Manera	Wisin y Yandel	Reggaeton	"Piden Perreo" "Hola" "Reggae Rockeao"	Fresh Productions
20	Revolución de Amor	Maná	Pop rock	"Ángel de Amor" "Eres Mi Religión" "Mariposa Traicionera" "Sábanas Frías"	Warner Music Mexico
20	Hijas del Tomate	Las Ketchup	Europop, Flamenco	"The Ketchup Song (Aserejé)"	Columbia, Columbia, Shaketown Music
20	Corazón Latino	David Bisbal	Flamenco, Latin, Ballad	"Lloraré Las Penas"	Universal, Vale Music
20	Latino	Grupo Manía	Merengue	"Un Beso"	Universal Music Latino
21	Di Blasio-Gardel Tango	Raúl di Blasio			
27	Pienso Así	Milly Quezada	Merengue, Salsa		Sony Discos
27	Fantasia Cubana: Variations on Classical Themes	Chucho Valdés	Modern, Contemporary, Romantic		Blue Note
27	Marca Registrada	Ilegales	Merengue, Latin, Hip-House		Virgin
27	Brazilian Dreams	Paquito D'Rivera	Latin Jazz		MCG Jazz
27	Mas de lo Que Merecias	Chuy Vega			

==== September ====
Day	Title	Artist	Genre(s)	Singles	Label
2	Orillas	Juan Carmona	Flamenco		Night & Day
3	Viceversa	Gilberto Santa Rosa	Salsa, Bolero, Ballad	"Por Más Que Intento" "Si Te Dijerón" "Un Montón de Estrellas" ""El Refrán Se Te Olvidó"	Sony Discos
3	Los Mejores Temas de las Películas de Walt Disney	Tatiana			Paramusica
10	Cuentos de la cripta 2	El Chombo	Reggaeton		Not On Label (El Chombo Self-released)
10	Grandes Hits	Cristian Castro	Ballad, Vocal	"Cuando Me Miras Así"	BMG Spain, RCA
17	Quizás	Enrique Iglesias	Ballad	"Mentiroso" "Quizás" "Para Qué la Vida"	Universal Music Latino
17	Radio Bemba Sound System	Manu Chao	Folk Rock, Punk, Ska		Virgin, Virgin
17	Un Gran Dia en el Barrio	Spanish Harlem Orchestra	Salsa, Afro-Cuban		Ropeadope Records, Rykodisc
17	Sigo Siendo El Hombre Merengue	Kinito Méndez	Merengue, Bachata		J&N Records
17	Mundo	Rubén Blades	Salsa, Pop rock		Sony Discos, Columbia
18	Sonho Azul	Sandy & Junior			Mercury, PolyGram
18	Amor Pra Recomeçar	Roberto Frejat			
18	Brilhante	Trio Parada Dura			
18	O Dono do Mundo	Milionario and José Rico			Chantecler, Continental EastWest
24	Amorcito Corazón	Lupillo Rivera	Banda		Sony Music, Cintas Acuario
24	The Shadow of the Cat	Gato Barbieri	Latin Jazz		Peak Records
24	Acuerdate	Emilio Navaira	Tejano		RCA, BMG Mexico
24	A Taste of Texas	Mingo Saldivar y Sus Tremendos Cuatro Espadas			Rounder Select
30	Teatro Real De Madrid	Diego El Cigala with Niño Josele			

=== Fourth quarter ===
==== October ====
Day	Title	Artist	Genre(s)	Singles	Label
17	El Mundo De Plan B, Los Que La Montan	Plan B	Reggaeton		Chencho Records

==== November ====
Day	Title	Artist	Genre(s)	Singles	Label
1	El Abayarde	Tego Calderón	Reggaeton		White Lion Records
4	Tribalistas	Tribalistas	Pop rock, MPB, samba, bossa nova	"Já Sei Namorar" "Velha Infância"	Phonomotor Records, EMI
5	Un Canto de México	Alejandro Fernández	Bolero, Mariachi, Ranchera		Sony Discos
5	Millie	Millie			
5	A la Reconquista	Héctor & Tito	Reggaeton		Universal
5	El General De Fiesta	El General			
5	El Limi-T 21	Limi-T 21	Merengue		
12	En Hora Buena	Aida Cuevas			
12	Suena La Banda	Los Tucanes de Tijuana			
18	Bocas Ordinárias	Charlie Brown Jr.	Pop rock		EMI
19	La Fiesta del Chichicuilote	El Chichicuilote			
19	Sobrevivir	Olga Tañón	Latin Pop, Merengue	"Así es la Vida" "No Podrás"	Warner Music Latina
19	Santo Pecado	Ricardo Arjona	Latin Pop	"El Problema" "Dame" "Minutos	Sony Discos
19	Acústico Vol. II	Ednita Nazario	Ballad		Sony Discos
19	...No Voy a Llorar	Cuisillos de Arturo Macias			Musart Premier
19	Situaciones	Palomo			
26	Latin Songbird: Mi Alma y Corazón	La India		"Sedúceme" "Traición" "Soy Mujer"	Sony Discos
26	Siempre es hoy	Gustavo Cerati	Pop rock, Alternative Rock		BMG Ariola Argentina S.A.
26	Escúchame	Joseph Fonseca	Merengue, Bachata	"Que Levante La Mano" "Escúchame"	Karen Records
26	Duetos 2	Armando Manzanero	Bolero		WEA
26	Swing A Domicilio	Los Hermanos Rosario			Karen Records
26	35 Aniversario — Lo Mejor de Lara	Vicente Fernández	Ranchera		Columbia, Sony
26	Acústico	Mercedes Sosa			

==== December ====
Day	Title	Artist	Genre(s)	Singles	Label
1	Acústico ao Vivo	Edson & Hudson			Abril Music
9	Cantoria Brasileira	Elomar, Pena Branca, Renato Teixeira, Teca Calazans and Xangai			
10	Mis 70 Años Con El Cante	Antonio Núñez	Flamenco		Universal, Muxxic
10	Biber: Requiem Á 15 Battalia Á 10	Jordi Savall and Capella Reial de Catalunya	Baroque		Alia Vox
10	Fatal Fantasy 3	DJ Joe	Reggaeton		Universal Music Group
17	Afortunado	Joan Sebastian	Ranchera		Musart
17	Dez de Dezembro	Cássia Eller	Pop rock, MPB		Universal Music, Mercury
17	Guillaera	Las Guanabanas	Reggaeton		Flow Music, Cinq Music Group
24	Gal Bossa Tropical	Gal Costa			
30	Primeira Dama – A Música de Dona Ivone Lara	Leandro Braga	Latin Jazz, Samba		Carioca Discos

=== Unknown ===
Title	Artist	Genre(s)	Singles	Label
Senor Corazon (2002)	José Luis Rodríguez	Ballad		BMG U.S. Latin
Nóis E a Viola	As Galvão	Country		Continental EastWest, Chantecler
El Numero 100	Ramon Ayala & Sus Bravos Del Norte			
Guajiro del Asfalto	Nilo MC	Cubano, Hip-Hop, Latin, Ragga HipHop, Reggae		Chewaka
Ven, Es Tiempo de Adorarle	33 DC			
¡Fuacata! Live	Spam Allstars	Leftfield, Future Jazz, Latin		Elegua
Las Cosas Tienen Movimiento	Adrián Iaies Trio			EMI
Acústico MTV	Kid Abelha	MPB, Pop rock		Universal Music, Mercury
Rosas e Vinho Tinto	Capital Inicial	Alternative Rock, Pop rock		Abril Music
Margarita La Tornera	Ángeles Blancas, Plácido Domingo, Elisabete Matos, García Navarro, Àngel Òdena, Stefano Palatchi, and María Rey-Joly			
Mundo Frío	Lito & Polaco	Reggaeton		Pina Records
Tortilla Party	El Vacilón de la Manaña			
El Cangri.com	Daddy Yankee	Reggaeton		VI Music
Este viento fuerte que sopla	No Te Va Gustar	Reggae, Ska		Bizarro Records

== Best-selling records ==
=== Best-selling albums ===
The following is a list of the top 10 best-selling Latin albums in the United States in 2002, according to Billboard.

Rank	Album	Artist
1	Libre	Marc Anthony
2	Mis Romances	Luis Miguel
3	Revolución de Amor	Maná
4	Grandes Éxitos	Chayanne
5	MTV Unplugged	Alejandro Sanz
6	Un Día Normal	Juanes
7	Quizás	Enrique Iglesias
8	Déjame Entrar	Carlos Vives
9	Una Lágrima No Basta	Los Temerarios
10	Shhh!	A.B. Quintanilla and Los Kumbia Kings

=== Best-performing songs ===
The following is a list of the top 10 best-performing Latin songs in the United States in 2002, according to Billboard.

Rank	Single	Artist
1	"Y Tú Te Vas"	Chayanne
2	"Quítame Ese Hombre"	Pilar Montenegro
3	"Suerte"	Shakira
4	"Entra en Mi Vida"	Sin Bandera
5	"A Dios le Pido"	Juanes
6	"El Dolor de Tu Presencia"	Jennifer Peña
7	"Usted Se Me Llevó la Vida"	Alexandre Pires
8	"Tantita Pena"	Alejandro Fernández
9	"Yo Puedo Hacer"	Ricardo Montaner
10	"Yo Quería"	Cristian Castro

== Births ==
- March 10 – Júlia Gomes, actress and singer
- May 3 – MC Pedrinho, singer
- May 22 – Maisa Silva, singer, TV hostess and actress

== Deaths ==
- January 3 – Juan García Esquivel, 83, Mexican band leader, pianist and composer
- March 24 – Wilson Fonseca, Brazilian composer, conductor and writer
- June 5 – Carmelo Bernaola, 72, Spanish composer and clarinetist
- December 10 – El Carrao de Palmarito, 74, Venezuelan llanero singer
