= List of Billboard Regional Mexican Albums number ones of 2002 =

The Regional Mexican Albums, published in Billboard magazine, is a record chart that features Latin music sales information for regional styles of Mexican music. This data are compiled by Nielsen SoundScan from a sample that includes music stores, music departments at department stores and verifiable sales from concert venues in the United States.

== Albums ==
Issue Date	Album	Artist	Reference
January 5	Sufriendo A Solas	Lupillo Rivera	
January 12	Sufriendo A Solas	Lupillo Rivera	
January 19	Sufriendo A Solas	Lupillo Rivera	
January 26	Sufriendo A Solas	Lupillo Rivera	
February 2	Sufriendo A Solas	Lupillo Rivera	
February 9	Sufriendo A Solas	Lupillo Rivera	
February 16	Soy Lo Prohibido	Alicia Villarreal	
February 23	Las 30 Cumbias Más Pegadas	Various Artists	
March 2	Las Romanticas De Los Tucanes De Tijuana	Los Tucanes de Tijuana	
March 9	Las Romanticas De Los Tucanes De Tijuana	Los Tucanes de Tijuana	
March 16	Las Romanticas De Los Tucanes De Tijuana	Los Tucanes de Tijuana	
March 23	Las 30 Cumbias Más Pegadas	Various Artists	
March 30	Las 30 Cumbias Más Pegadas	Various Artists	
April 6	Las 30 Cumbias Más Pegadas	Various Artists	
April 13	Las 30 Cumbias Más Pegadas	Various Artists	
April 20	Las 30 Cumbias Más Pegadas	Various Artists	
April 27	Sueños	Intocable	
May 4	Sueños	Intocable	
May 11	Sueños	Intocable	
May 18	Sueños	Intocable	
May 25	Historia De Un Idolo Vol. 2	Vicente Fernández	
June 1	Historia Musical	Los Temerarios	
June 8	Historia Musical	Los Temerarios	
June 15	Historia Musical	Los Temerarios	
June 22	Historia Musical	Los Temerarios	
June 29	Libre	Jennifer Peña	
July 6	Libre	Jennifer Peña	
July 13	Una Lágrima No Basta	Los Temerarios	
July 20	Una Lágrima No Basta	Los Temerarios	
July 27	Una Lágrima No Basta	Los Temerarios	
August 3	Una Lágrima No Basta	Los Temerarios	
August 10	Una Lágrima No Basta	Los Temerarios	
August 17	No Me Sé Rajar	Banda el Recodo de Cruz Lizarraga	
August 24	Una Lágrima No Basta †	Los Temerarios	
August 31	Una Lágrima No Basta †	Los Temerarios	
September 7	Perdoname Mi Amor	Conjunto Primavera	
September 14	Perdoname Mi Amor	Conjunto Primavera	
September 21	Perdoname Mi Amor	Conjunto Primavera	
September 28	Perdoname Mi Amor	Conjunto Primavera	
October 5	Perdoname Mi Amor	Conjunto Primavera	
October 12	Amorcito Corazon	Lupillo Rivera	
October 19	Amorcito Corazon	Lupillo Rivera	
October 26	Perdoname Mi Amor	Conjunto Primavera	
November 2	Perdoname Mi Amor	Conjunto Primavera	
November 9	Historia Musical	Liberacion	
November 16	La Reina Del Sur	Los Tigres del Norte	
November 23	La Reina Del Sur	Los Tigres del Norte	
November 30	La Reina Del Sur	Los Tigres del Norte	
December 7	La Reina Del Sur	Los Tigres del Norte	
December 14	La Reina Del Sur	Los Tigres del Norte	
December 21	La Reina Del Sur	Los Tigres del Norte	
December 28	La Reina Del Sur	Los Tigres del Norte	
