= List of number-one Billboard Top Latin Albums of 2002 =

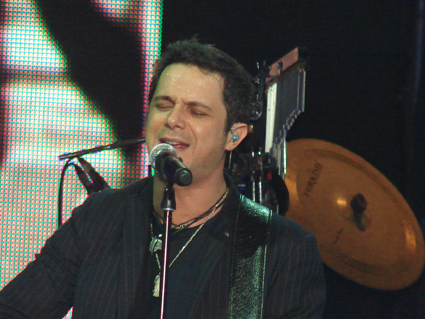
Alejandro Sanz peaked at number one for the first time on this chart in 2002.

The Billboard Top Latin albums chart, published in Billboard magazine, is a record chart that features Latin music sales information. This data are compiled by Nielsen SoundScan from a sample that includes music stores, music departments at electronics and department stores, internet sales (both physical and via digital downloads) and verifiable sales from concert venues in United States.

There were fifteen number-one albums in 2002, including Libre by Marc Anthony, which received a nomination for Best Salsa album at the Latin Grammy Awards of 2002, and MTV Unplugged by Alejandro Sanz—the winner of the Latin Grammy Award for Album of the Year. Spanish singer-songwriter Enrique Iglesias peaked at number one for the fifth time on this chart with Quizás, while Colombian performer Shakira, Mexican norteño band Los Tigres del Norte, and rock band Maná released their third chart topper, respectively. Los Temerarios became the fourth act to release two number-one albums in the same year, after Selena, Enrique Iglesias and Grupo Bryndis. Intocable, Chayanne, Thalía, Las Ketchup, Banda el Recodo and Luis Fonsi peaked at number one for the first time.

One compilation album hit the top of this chart in 2002, Las 30 Cumbias Más Pegadas, which includes performances by Angeles Azules, Grupo Carabo, Los Askis, Rayito Colombiano, Chon Arauza y La Furia Colombiana, Aaron y Su Grupo Illusion, Grupo Perla Colombiana and Tropa Vallenata.

== Albums ==
Issue Date	Album	Artist	Reference
January 5	Libre (Free)	Marc Anthony	
January 12	Libre (Free)	Marc Anthony	
January 19	Libre (Free)	Marc Anthony	
January 26	Libre (Free)	Marc Anthony	
February 2	Libre (Free)	Marc Anthony	
February 9	Libre (Free)	Marc Anthony	
February 16	Libre (Free)	Marc Anthony	
February 23	Libre (Free)	Marc Anthony	
March 2	Libre (Free)	Marc Anthony	
March 9	Libre (Free)	Marc Anthony	
March 16	MTV Unplugged	Alejandro Sanz	
March 23	MTV Unplugged	Alejandro Sanz	
March 30	Amor Secreto (Secret Love)	Luis Fonsi	
April 6	Amor Secreto (Secret Love)	Luis Fonsi	
April 13	Las 30 Cumbias Más Pegadas (The 30 Best Cumbias)	Various artists	
April 20	Grandes Éxitos (Greatest Hits)	Chayanne	
April 27	Sueños (Dreams)	Intocable	
May 4	Sueños (Dreams)	Intocable	
May 11	Sueños (Dreams)	Intocable	
May 18	Sueños (Dreams)	Intocable	
May 25	Grandes Éxitos	Chayanne	
June 1	Historia Musical (Musical History)	Los Temerarios	
June 8	Thalía	Thalía	
June 15	Thalía	Thalía	
June 22	Thalía	Thalía	
June 29	Thalía	Thalía	
July 6	Thalía	Thalía	
July 13	Una Lágrima No Basta (A Tear Is Not Enough)	Los Temerarios	
July 20	Una Lágrima No Basta (A Tear Is Not Enough)	Los Temerarios	
July 27	Una Lágrima No Basta (A Tear Is Not Enough)	Los Temerarios	
August 3	Una Lágrima No Basta (A Tear Is Not Enough)	Los Temerarios	
August 10	Una Lágrima No Basta (A Tear Is Not Enough)	Los Temerarios	
August 17	No Me Sé Rajar (I Won't Back Down)	Banda el Recodo	
August 24	Una Lágrima No Basta	Los Temerarios	
August 31	Una Lágrima No Basta	Los Temerarios	
September 7	Revolución de Amor (Love Revolution)	Maná	
September 14	Revolución de Amor (Love Revolution)	Maná	
September 21	Revolución de Amor (Love Revolution)	Maná	
September 28	Revolución de Amor (Love Revolution)	Maná	
October 5	Quizás (Maybe)	Enrique Iglesias	
October 12	Quizás (Maybe)	Enrique Iglesias	
October 19	Quizás (Maybe)	Enrique Iglesias	
October 26	Quizás (Maybe)	Enrique Iglesias	
November 2	Las Ketchup	Las Ketchup	
November 9	Las Ketchup	Las Ketchup	
November 16	La Reina del Sur (Queen of the South)	Los Tigres del Norte	
November 23	Grandes Éxitos (Greatest Hits)	Shakira	
November 30	La Reina del Sur	Los Tigres del Norte	
December 7	Las Ketchup	Las Ketchup	
December 14	Las Ketchup	Las Ketchup	
December 21	Las Ketchup	Las Ketchup	
December 28	Las Ketchup	Las Ketchup	
