= Arcuri =

Arcuri is a surname. Notable people with the surname include:

- A. J. Arcuri (born 1997), American football player
- Alfie Arcuri (born 1988), Australian singer-songwriter
- Amanda Arcuri (born 1997), Canadian actress
- Domenico Arcuri (born 1963), Italian manager
- Felipe Arcuri (born 1974), Venezuelan musician, songwriter, and composer
- Jeff Arcuri (born 1987 or 1988), American stand-up comedian
- Jennifer Arcuri (born 1985), American businesswoman
- Manuela Arcuri (born 1977), Italian actress, model, and soubrette
- María Elena Lucena Arcuri (1914–2015), Argentine actress
- Mike Arcuri (born 1959), American politician
