= Albert Torres =

Albert Torres may refer to:

- Albert Torres (salsa promoter) (1956–2017), American Salsa promoter
- Albert Torres (cyclist) (born 1990), Spanish cyclist
- Albert Torres (screenwriter), writer of the film Henry Poole Is Here

== See also ==
- Albert Torras (born 1996), Spanish footballer
