= Kraken II =

Studio album by Kraken
- Released: 1989
- Recorded: 1989
- Genre: Heavy metal
- Label: Codiscos
- Producer: Víctor "Bender" García

Kraken chronology
Kraken I (1987)	Kraken II (1989)	Kraken III (1990)

Kraken II is the name of the second studio album Colombian group Kraken. It was released in December 5, 1989 by Codiscos. The first single from the album was "Vestido de Cristal". The second single was "Una Vez Más".

== Information ==
Kraken II was produced taking into account a wider rock audience. Its composition took a record time for the group members since they had to comply with live shows and the production of all the material that they had to select and create. A keyboardist replaced the former lead guitarist because of the need for a sound more akin to their influences and musical objectives to keep up with rock bands of the day. For the first time in Colombian history, a hard rock song (the opening track) Vestido de Cristal became the most played song on national youth radio stations. The inclusion of keyboards was definitive for this album, despite the criticism and the fear of using these instrument.

== Track listing ==
No.	Title	Length
1.	"Los Misterios no Hablan (Mysteries Don't Talk)"	04:03
2.	"Vestido de Cristal (Crystal Dress)"	04:56
3.	"Después del Final (After the End)"	06:03
4.	"Al caer las Murallas (At the Fall of the City Wall)"	06:28
5.	"Camino a la Montaña Negra (Road to Black Mountain)"	05:53
6.	"Palabras que Sangran (Words That Bleed)"	04:47
7.	"Una Vez Más (Once Again)"	05:14
8.	"Esclavos de las Sombras (Slaves of the Shadows)"	5:07

== Personnel ==
- Elkin Ramírez: vocals, lyrics
- Hugo Restrepo: guitar
- Jorge Atehortua: electric bass
- Gonzalo Vásquez: drums
- Jaime Ochoa Lalinde: keyboards (Co-Writing "Vestido de Cristal")
- Víctor García: keyboards, sound engineer, producer
