= Arcuri Overthrow =

Venezuelan experimental metal band

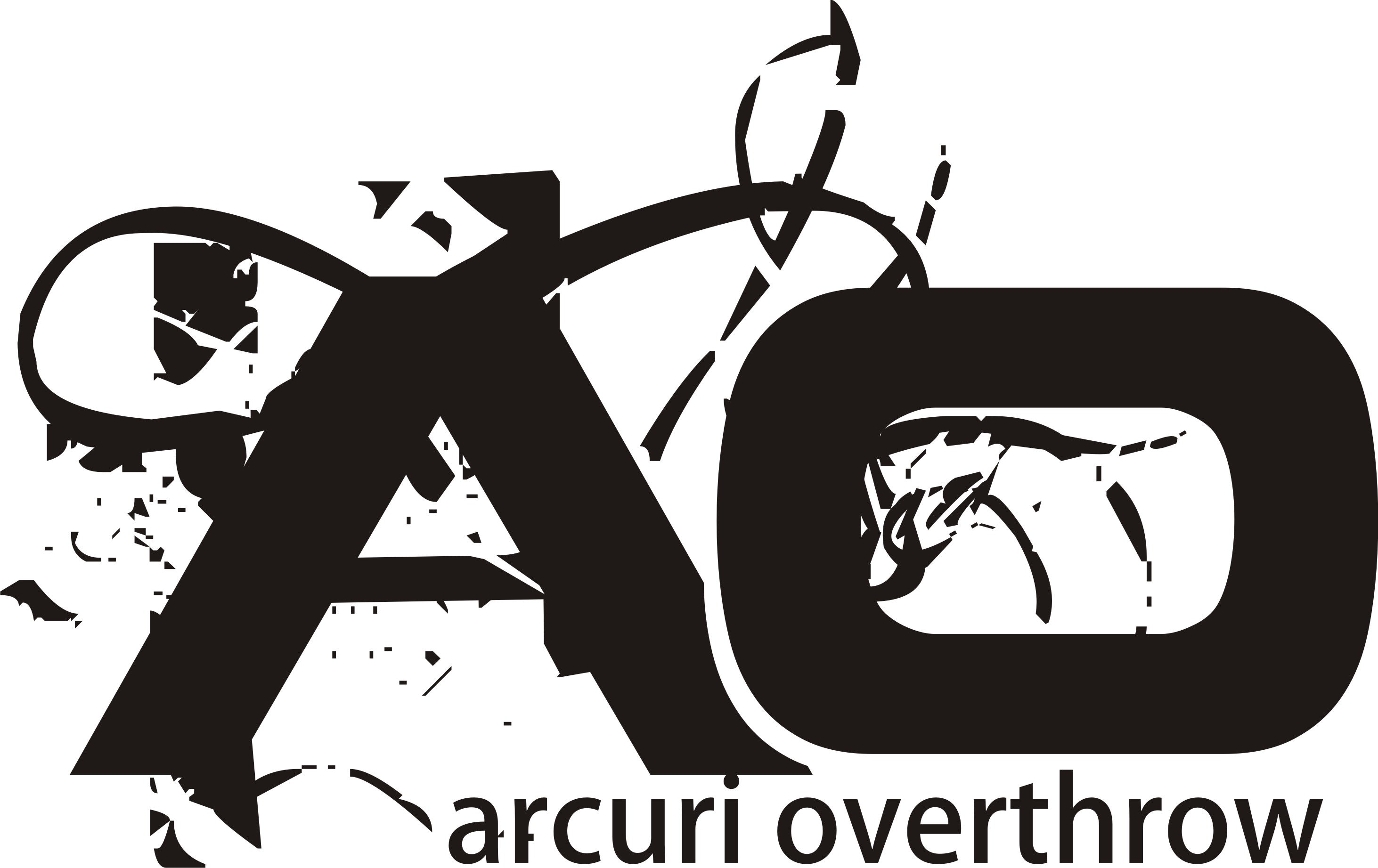

Background information
- Origin: Valencia, Venezuela
- Genres: Experimental metal
- Years active: 2002–present
- Spinoff of: Arkangel; Gillman
- Members: Felipe Arcuri; Vicente Arcuri; Fiorella Arcuri; Luis Loyo
- Website: www.fratelliarcuri.com/arcurioverthrow/

Arcuri Overthrow is a Venezuelan experimental metal band based in Valencia, Venezuela. The band was formed in 2002 in Valencia by the brothers Arcuri: bassist Felipe and drummer Vicente, with the original name Black Rainbow. It's the first Venezuelan metal band, only with bass and drums.

== History ==
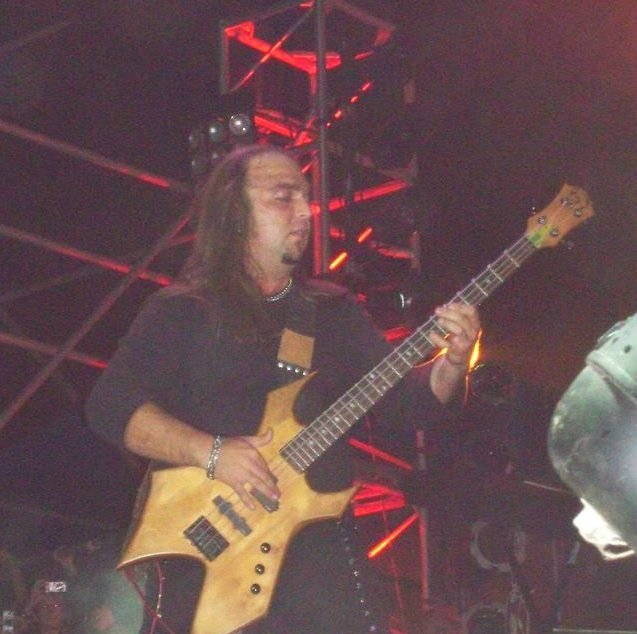
Felipe Arcuri

Its members are the brothers Arcuri: Felipe (bass player of the Venezuelan heavy metal band Arkangel) and Vicente (drummer of the Venezuelan heavy metal band Gillman), who in 2002, founded an experimental project, originally called Black Rainbow, the first metal band in Venezuela, only with bass and drums, replacing guitars with bass guitar, and adding electronic sequences executed under the MIDI environment. That year, they had a unique performance at the Festival Nuevas Bandas (a musical contest that features newborn bands of different genres from all over the country), capturing the attention and applause of the audience, but the project remained in pause, due to the multiple commitments of the Arcuri brothers with their other activities. Meanwhile, they kept accumulating experience, rehearsing and creating themes.

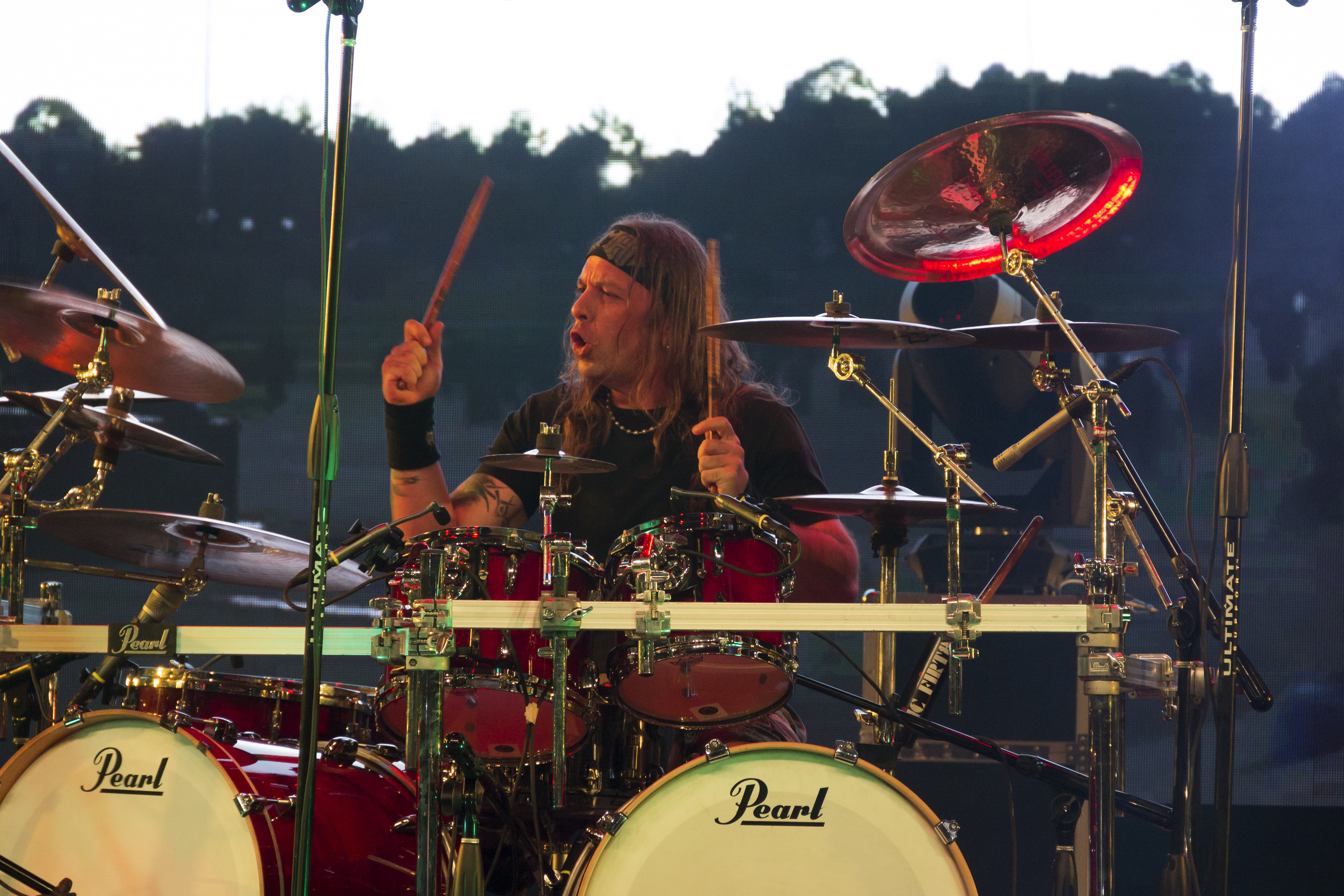
Vicente Arcuri

From 2011, the project, initially called Black Rainbow, evolves and happens to be call Arcuri Overthrow, and they recorded several singles, compiled in an EP called "Inicio", with the participation of some Latin American rock stars, between them: Elkin Ramírez singer of Colombian hard rock band Kraken, and Hugo Bistolfi keyboardist of Argentine heavy metal band Rata Blanca. Besides, they also collaborated: Andrew Vincze (Venezuelan vocalist of the Hungarian/Venezuelan progressive metal band Progness), and the string ensemble Akashiaft.

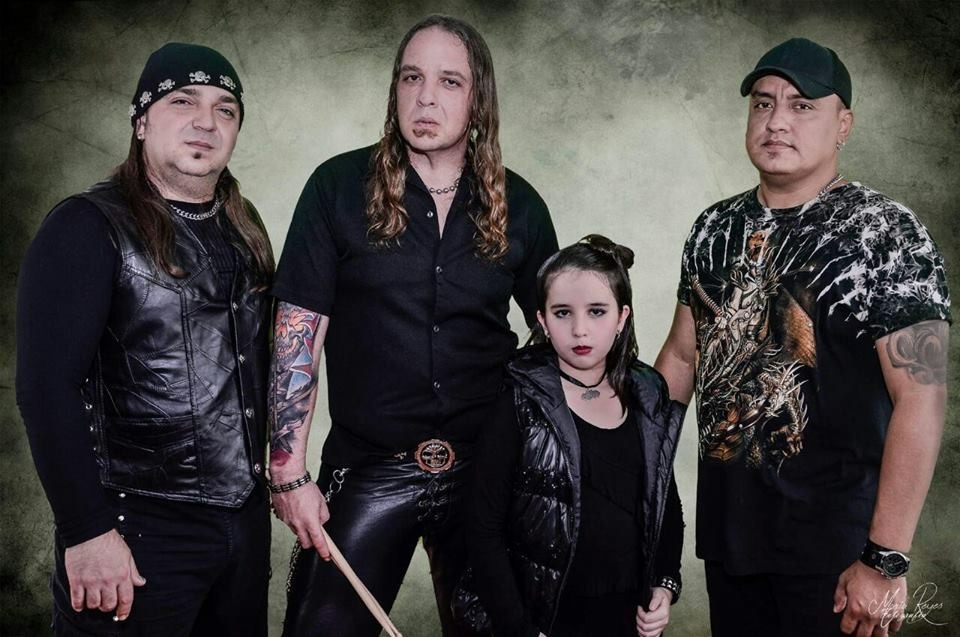
Arcuri Overthrow's members: left to right, Felipe, Vicente and Fiorella Arcuri, and Luis Loyo.

2016, brings as new members of the group to: the 'Princess of the National Rock' of Venezuela, the girl Fiorella Arcuri, Vicente's daughter, and Felipe's niece, in the voices, and Luis Loyo, on bass. Rubén Hernández and Luis Loyo perform as musical producers, along with the Arcuri brothers, who are the executive producers of the band too.

In 2017, the band is recording their first album, which has the participation of several guests from the Latin American rock scene.

== Band members ==
- Felipe Arcuri – bass, backing vocals
- Vicente Arcuri – drums
- Fiorella Arcuri – backing vocals
- Luis Loyo – bass, backing vocals

== Discography ==
=== EPs ===
- Inicio (2011)
