= Felipe Arcuri =

Venezuelan musician (born 1974)

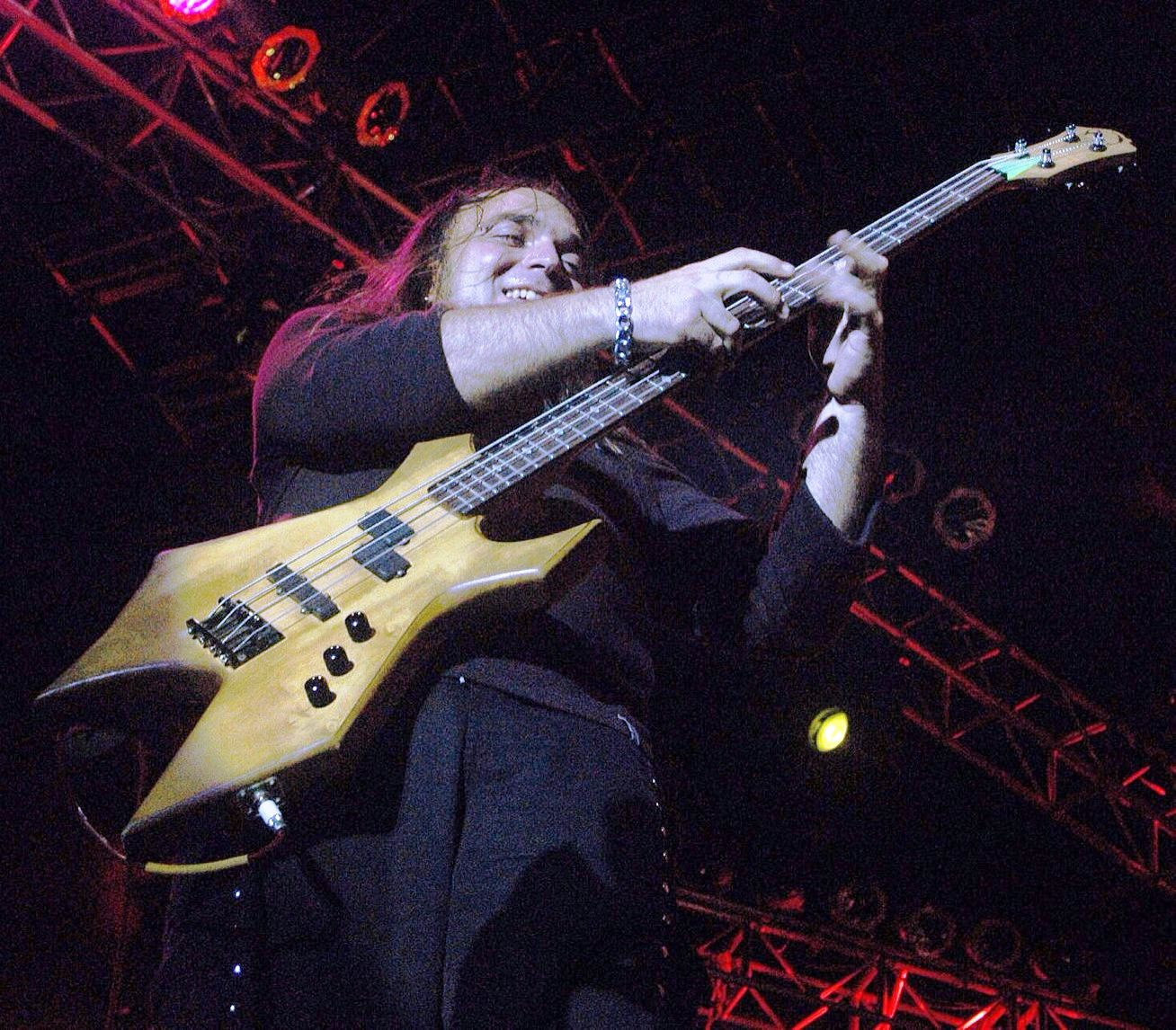

Background information
- Also known as: Arkangel
- Born: Felipe Arcuri; June 4, 1974 (age 52); Valencia, Carabobo, Venezuela
- Genres: Heavy metal; hard rock
- Occupations: Musician, songwriter
- Instruments: Bass guitar, backing vocals
- Years active: 1990–present
- Formerly of: Arcuri Overthrow; Aleph
- Website: www.felipearcuri.com

Felipe Arcuri, (Spanish pronunciation: [feˈlipe]-Italian pronunciation: [arˈkuːri]) born in Valencia, Carabobo, Venezuela (June 4, 1974), is a musician, songwriter and composer specializing in the genre known as Heavy Metal. He is known as the bassist of the Venezuelan heavy metal band Arkangel.

He is also co-founder, and bassist of the Venezuelan heavy metal band Arcuri Overthrow, together with his brother Vicente Arcuri, current drummer of the band Gillman. And, he was also a member of Aleph and Gillman.

== Career ==
Felipe Arcuri started to play rock from very child, when it was in the high school. His musical studies were with particular teachers, and Venezuelan college: Tecnológico de Música Valencia. He started his musical career, performed as guitarist of a high school band, in a festival of Don Bosco School, and played the songs "Breaking the Law" of Judas Priest, and "Los rockeros van al infierno" of Spanish heavy metal band Barón Rojo.

Later, he began to explore and to fall in love of what would be his favorite instrument: the bass in 1990, and formed a Venezuelan progressive rock called Aleph as bassist. By early 1995, Arkangel opened auditions in the search of a new bassist after Breno Díaz's exit of the band, and Alfredo Rojas, former Stage Manager of Arkangel, friend and roadie of the band Aleph, invited to Arcuri to a private audition. He attended the same one, and it received band's positive and immediate response, after which, Arcuri soon left Aleph to join Arkangel.

In 2002, co-founded with his brother Vicente, an experimental project called Black Rainbow, the first band of heavy metal in Venezuela, only with bass and drum.

Simultaneously, between 2005 and 2008, he was a bassist of the Venezuelan heavy metal band Gillman, playing in multiple concerts, included several editions of the Venezuelan rock festival Gillmanfest. In turn, between 2005 and 2009, formed a part of the project called as Arkangel Reunión, together with the brothers Giancarlo and Giorgio Picozzi, and Paul Gillman, founder members of Arkangel, for several tours in Venezuela, and Colombia, where they played only songs of the first three studio releases of the band.

He has been co-composer and co-lyricist some of Arkangel's songs like "Derrota final", "Damas de la noche", "Justicia y poder", "Hacia la eternidad", y "Madre tierra», of the álbum "El Ángel de la Muerte", and all the songs of album "MMVII".

From 2011, the project, initially called Black Rainbow, evolves and happens to be call Arcuri Overthrow, and they recorded several singles, with the participation of some Latin American rock stars, between them: Elkin Ramírez singer of Colombian hard rock band Kraken, and Hugo Bistolfi keyboardist of Argentine heavy metal band Rata Blanca.

In 2017, at the same time to his works with Arkangel and Arcuri Overthrow, he is developing a new musical project.

== Other interests and talents ==
In addition to playing bass and writing music/lyrics for the bands Arkangel and Arcuri Overthrow, Felipe Arcuri is the manager of both. He was a co-manager of the band Aleph.

Besides his work as musician, Arcuri is an broadcaster. He is also director, producer and host of the show of radio and TV La Zona, specialized in all genres of heavy metal. The program had been transmitted by the channels NCTV and DAT TV, both of Valencia, and TVS channel of Maracay.

At the same time, he works at Fratelli Arcuri, dedicated to the management of artists, and organization of concerts.

He had obtained several degrees: Administrative sciences at Universidad Tecnológica del Centro, and Physiotherapy and Imagenology at Arturo Michelena University.

== Discography ==
=== Albums ===
==== Arkangel ====
- El Angel de la Muerte (2000)
- MMVII (2008)
- Theatrum Timorem (2019)

=== EP ===
==== Arcuri Overthrow ====
- Inicio (2011)

=== Singles ===
==== Aleph ====
- Ciudad de batalla (1992)
