= Kraken I =

Studio album by Kraken
- Released: 1987
- Recorded: 1986–1987
- Genre: Heavy metal
- Length: 40:14
- Label: Codiscos

Kraken chronology
Kraken I (1987)	Kraken II (1989)

Kraken I is the name of the first studio album by Colombian group Kraken. It was released on December 7, 1987 by Codiscos.

== Information ==
In 1986 Kraken recorded their first single in a 45 RPM format, under the condition of getting at least 500 signatures from people committed to buying the demanded copies, that at last ended up selling 15.000 copies on its first year. The songs chosen were "Todo Hombre es una Historia" and "Muere Libre".

Their vocalist, Elkin Ramírez, makes successful arrangements to exit the borders of their city, allowing them to visit Pereira in 1986, performing in the minor coliseum of "Perla del Otun". In early 1987, Kraken records their second single in the same format "Escudo y Espada" and "Soy Real". The sales reached 7.500 copies. The result of such sales in a period of less than 6 months alarmed the record label which possessed the rights to their music and in the middle of that year, their first LP, Kraken I, was recorded.

This album marked Colombian rock history since it was the first Colombian hard rock band to achieve wide acceptance in television and radio, having sold more than 150.000 copies nationally in a few months, which immediately led to their first national tour and the production of their second record, Kraken II.

== Track listing ==
No.	Title	Length
1.	"Todo hombre es una historia (Every Man Is a Story)"	4:47
2.	"No me hables de amor (Don't Talk To Me About Love)"	4:27
3.	"Muere Libre (Die Free)"	3:56
4.	"Escudo y espada (Shield & Sword)"	5:41
5.	"Nada ha cambiado aún (Nothing Has Changed Yet)"	3:50
6.	"Soy real (I'm Real)"	5:10
7.	"Fugitivo (Fugitive)"	4:54
8.	"Aves negras (Black Birds)"	4:07

== Personnel ==
- Elkin Ramírez: vocals, lyrics.
- Hugo Restrepo: lead guitar.
- Ricardo Posada: lead guitar.
- Jorge Atehortua: electric bass.
- Gonzalo Vásquez: drums.
