= Salsa congress =

A Salsa congress is a multi-day dance festival featuring workshops, social dancing, performances and competitions focusing on Salsa dancing. The format was first pioneered at the Puerto Rico Salsa Congress in 1997.

Since then salsa congresses have become popular in almost every country, including different cities in the US, all over Europe, parts of Asia, and countries in Latin America and Africa. There are many events that follow a similar format to salsa congresses, but go by other names such as "Salsa Festival" or "Salsa Summit".

== Puerto Rico Salsa Congress ==
The first salsa congress in the world took place in Puerto Rico in 1997 promoted by Eli Irizarry. The number of people participating in this first edition was 375 coming from 19 different countries.

In 1998 the number of participants was 550 from 23 countries, with 32 salsa companies performing and teaching and by 1999 there were 800 people from 34 countries with about 56 salsa companies taking part. In 2008 the finals of the World Salsa Open were hosted at the Puerto Rico Congress which concluded with Spain (Anita Santos and Adrián Rodríguez) winning the first position, Puerto Rico (Licelott Maldonado and Kelvin Hernández) as runner-up and Argentina (Fernando Alonso and Ayelen Gauna) in third place.

== Congreso Mundial de la Salsa ==
The All Stars Entertainment company and Bacardí promoted between 1999 and 2002 a salsa tour, called the "Congreso Mundial de la salsa" in several locations including New York, Los Angeles, Chicago, Curaçao, Denver, Tokyo, Bombay, Calcutta, Valencia, Roma, Torino, Milan, Santiago de Compostela, Berlin, Frankfurt, Munich, London, Amsterdam, Miami, Mexico, Panamá, Colombia, Venezuela, Guayaquil, Osaka, Buenos Aires, Sydney, Paris or San Juan de Puerto Rico.

== Los Angeles Salsa Congress ==
In 1999 the salsa promoter Albert Torres organized the first salsa congress in the United States in Los Angeles. The congress was originally called the "West Coast Salsa Congress", but was later changed to the "LA Salsa Congress" as more cities on the West Coast began hosting congresses. Held every May, the congress grew to become one of the largest salsa events in the world. In 2013 the event was renamed to the "LA Salsa Fest". In 2019 the LA Salsa Fest came to a close, after 20 years in operation after the death of its founder.

== Salsa congresses in Europe ==
By 2013, salsa congresses and festivals had become an annual tradition in almost half of the main European cities, the oldest being the "World Salsa Congress" in Valencia (Spain) organized by Fermín Olaya, London (UK), Berlin (Germany), Warsaw] (Poland), Vilnius (Lithuania), Budapest (Hungary), Brașov (Romania), Split (Croatia), Milan (Italy), Riga (Latvia), Munich (Germany), Maribor (Slovenia), Edinburgh (Scotland) and many others.

Many of the most successful and relevant salsa congresses in Europe started in 1999. The first was the Bacardi Salsa Congress "World Salsa Congress" that was held in Valencia (Spain) from October 20 to 24, 1999, organized by Manuel Mascarell and Fermín Olaya, some that followed from 2002 were the International Salsa Congress of the United Kingdom in London, the Salsa Symposium (Madrid), Rome, Hamburg and the Swiss Salsa Congress in Zurich. One of the first salsa congresses in Germany was 2003 in Regensburg. Report Regensburg Salsa Congress 2003

The Croatian Summer Salsa Festival (CSSF) in Rovinj, Croatia was founded in 2005, which is one of the biggest social dance festivals in Europe. Tallinn Salsafestival (TSF) in Estonia.

The Vilnius Salsa Festival (VSF) that takes place annually in Lithuania was started in 2007.

There are many other congresses in Europe now available to enjoy, each with its own unique flavour; in the UK for instance is the Teesside Latin Festival (started in 2009) in the north east of England, which is one of the most popular and fastest growing in UK. The congress combines LA salsa, NY Salsa and Cuban Salsa in one festival. It also includes a Kizomba Festival. The biggest Salsa festival in Ukraine is *Kyiv Dance Festival

When making a choice of congresses salseros first need to determine what they 'like' or prefer and their budgets. Some congresses cater more towards one style, such as Bachata, Cuban Salsa, LA/NY Salsa and NY on2, others give a taste of all styles and encourage salseros to experience different forms of dancing. As a general rule for beginners, improvers and intermediate dancers an 'all style' congress is the most suitable. More advanced dancers who specialise in a specific style of dancing may want to go to a more focused congress. Some combine a holiday with a congress, staying for a few extra days for sightseeing or to go to the beach.
