= Tributo al Titán =

Studio album by Kraken
- Released: 2007
- Recorded: 2007
- Genre: Heavy Metal
- Label: Athenea Producciones

Kraken Titan Tribute is the name of a studio album tribute to Colombian group Kraken. It was released on 2 April 2004 by Ethnicity Records.

== Information ==
This album comprises fifteen songs from every album of Kraken's discography. Various Colombian bands contributed the covers.

== Track listing ==
No.	Title	Length
1.	"Muere libre (Ascariz)"	04:46
2.	"Todo hombre es una historia (Tres de Corazón)"	03:53
3.	"Fugitivo (Athanator)"	05:24
4.	"No me hables de amor (Antártica)"	05:24
5.	"Soy real (Tenebrarum)"	04:34
6.	"Despues del final (Leyend Maker)"	05:43
7.	"Vestido de cristal (PopCorn)"	04:34
8.	"Aves negras (Draconian)"	05:29
9.	"Razones desnudas (Gianny)"	05:27
10.	"Frágil al viento (911)"	02:47
11.	"Lenguaje de mi piel (Gaias Pendulum)"	05:28
12.	"Palabras que sangran (Xendra)"	05:19
13.	"Rostros ocultos (Tom Sawyer)"	04:20
14.	"Camino a la montaña negra (Eternal)"	05:49
15.	"Escudo y Espada (Kraken)"	06:12
