= Kraken IV: Piel de Cobre =

IV: Piel de Cobre

Studio album by Kraken
- Released: November 4, 1993
- Recorded: 1993
- Genre: Heavy metal
- Label: Discos Fuentes

Kraken IV is the name of the fourth studio album from the Colombian group Kraken It was released on November 4, 1993, by Discos Fuentes. The first single from the album was "Lenguage de mi Piel ". The second single was "Piel de Cobre".

== Track listing ==
| No. | Title | Length |
|---|---|---|
| 1. | "America" | 04:03 |
| 2. | "Lenguaje de mi Piel" | 04:56 |
| 3. | "Méxica" | 06:03 |
| 4. | "Sensibilidad" | 06:28 |
| 5. | "O'culto" | 05:53 |
| 6. | "Vive" | 04:47 |
| 7. | "Siempre" | 05:14 |
| 8. | "Piel de Cobre" | 5:07 |
| 9. | "Eres" | 4:08 |
| 10. | "Azul" | 3:55 |
