= Humana Deshumanización =

Studio album by Kraken
- Released: 2009
- Recorded: 2009
- Genre: Heavy Metal
- Label: Athena Producciones

Humana Deshumanización (Human Dehumanization) is the seventh studio album by Colombian group Kraken It was released on 24 April 2009, by Athena Productions. The first single from the album was "El Tiempo no Miente Jamás". The second one was "Rompiendo el Hechizo", and the third "Extraña Predicción".

== Track listing ==
No.	Title	Length
1.	"El Viejo Galeón"	04:39
2.	"Cuervo de Sal"	07:13
3.	"El Tiempo no Miente Jamás"	04:35
4.	"Encrucijada"	05:44
5.	"Desde el Exilio"	04:53
6.	"Blanca Ironía"	06:03
7.	"Rompiendo el Hechizo"	04:57
8.	"Amnesia"	07:19
9.	"Extraña Predicción"	05:42
10.	"La Gran Legión"	08:54
11.	"Tríptico"	03:36
