= Albert Torres (salsa promoter) =

Salsa promoter

Albert Torres (June 14, 1956 – May 25, 2017) was an international salsa dance promoter from Los Angeles. He is known for being the organizer of the LA Salsa Fest, the longest running salsa congress in the US, as well as one of the organizers of the World Salsa Championships and later the World Latin Dance Cup.

Albert Torres had a number of minor film appearances in which he typically played the role of a dancer, including The Mambo Kings, Dance With Me, and Out to Sea. He also once danced with Jennifer Lopez on The Keenen Ivory Wayans Show in 1997.
