= Kraken Filarmónico =

Kraken

Studio album by Kraken
- Released: 2007
- Recorded: 2007
- Genre: Heavy Metal
- Label: Athenea Producciones

Filarmonico Kraken is the name of a live album by Colombian group Kraken It was released on December 15, 2007 by Athena Productions.

== Information ==
This album brings a total of thirteen songs. With songs like Vestido de Cristal, Frágil al Viento, Amnesia and America. This album was recorded with the Bogotá Philharmonic Orchestra.

== Track listing ==
No.	Title	Length
1.	"América"	04:47
2.	"Extraña Predicción"	04:27
3.	"Después del Final"	03:56
4.	"Lenguaje de mi Piel"	05:41
5.	"Sin Miedo al Dolor"	3:50
6.	"Méxica"	05:10
7.	"Vestido de Cristal"	05:53
8.	"Revolución"	4:07
9.	"Frágil al Viento"	04:56
10.	"No me Hables de Amor"	06:03
11.	"Hijos del Sur"	04:47
12.	"No te Detengas"	04:27
13.	"Amnesia"	03:56
