= Kraken IV + V - Vive el Rock Nacional =

IV + V - Vive el Rock Nacional

Studio album by Kraken
- Released: 2004
- Recorded: 2004
- Genre: Heavy metal
- Label: Discos Fuentes

Kraken IV + V Live the National Rock is the name of a studio album compilation of the Colombian group Kraken It was released on April 2, 2004 by Discos Fuentes.

== Information ==
This album brings a total of fifteen songs from the record works Kraken IV and V.

== Track listing ==
No.	Title	Length
1.	"Vive"	04:47
2.	"América"	04:27
3.	"Sin naufragar"	03:56
4.	"Silencioso amor"	05:41
5.	"Eres"	3:50
6.	"Ilusión"	05:10
7.	"Lenguaje de mi piel"	05:53
8.	"Méxica"	4:07
9.	"Respirando tu nombre"	04:56
10.	"Sensibilidad"	06:03
11.	"Siempre"	06:28
12.	"Déjame"	04:03
13.	"Soy"	06:03
14.	"O´culto"	06:28
15.	"Lenguaje de mi piel (acustico)"	04:03
