= Kraken V: El Símbolo de la Huella =

V: El Símbolo de la Huella

Studio album by Kraken
- Released: 1995
- Recorded: 1995
- Genre: Soft rock, heavy metal
- Label: Discos Fuentes

Kraken V Symbol Footprint is the name of the fifth studio album Colombian group Kraken, It was released on August 3, 1995 by Discos Fuentes. The first single from the album was "Silencioso Amor". The second single was "El Símbolo de la Huella".

== Information ==
This album showed a band exploratory facet. A high quality album art, sound influenced by the Jazz and Blues. For many one of the most aesthetic albums in rock history Colombiano.

== Track listing ==
No.	Title	Length
1.	"Las Voces del Viento"	03:49
2.	"Cuerpo de Arena"	05:08
3.	"Silencioso Amor"	03:36
4.	"Soy"	05:58
5.	"Sin Naufragar"	04:24
6.	"Ilusión"	06:45
7.	"Déjame"	04:13
8.	"Danzando en Soledad"	05:25
9.	"Mujer Del-fin"	04:13
10.	"Respirando tu Nombre"	05:25
11.	"Dimensión Real"	04:13
12.	"El Símbolo de la Huella"	05:25
