= Salsa (dance) =

Dance form

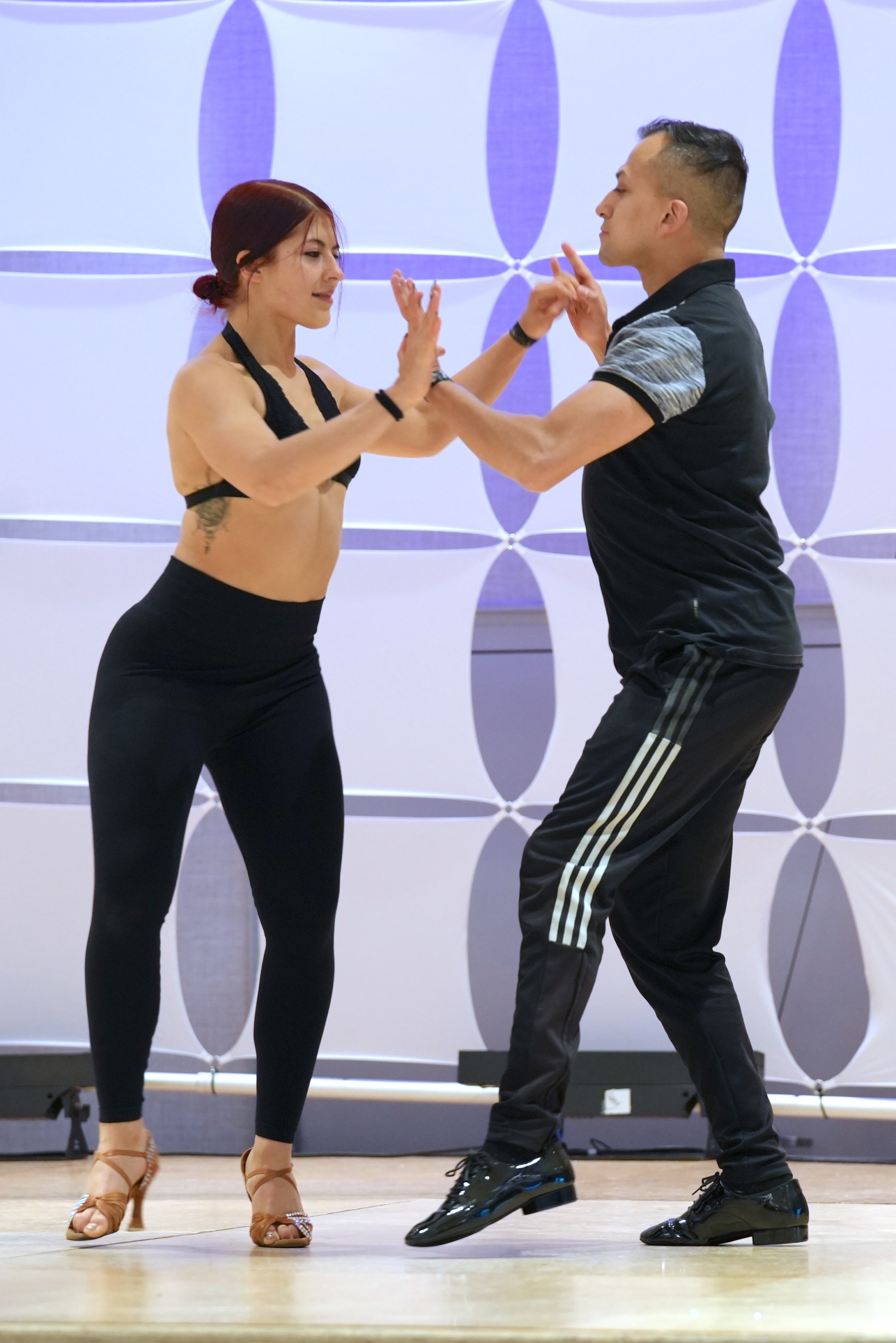
Salsa performance at the California Dance Festival 2025

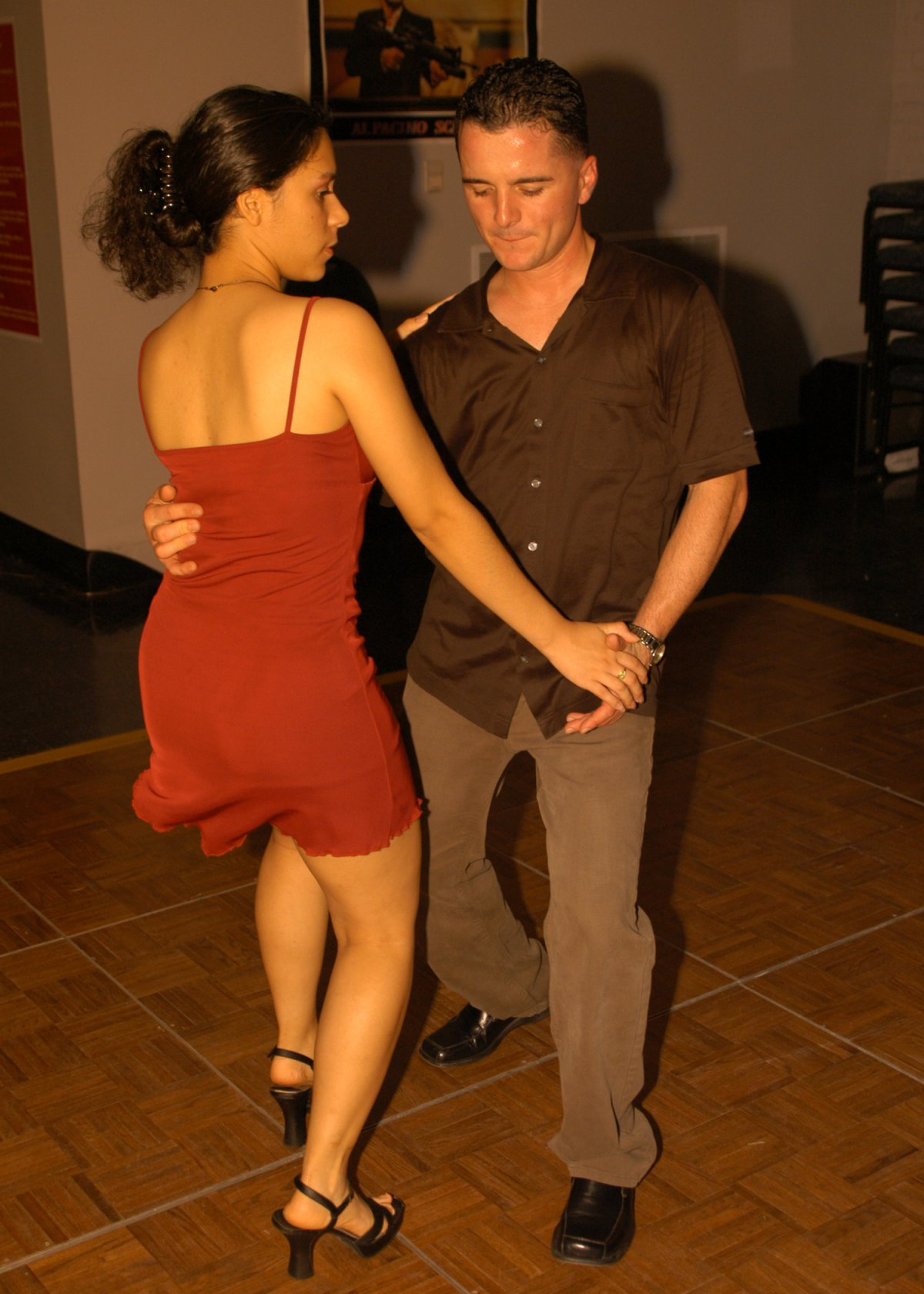
Salsa training in Ecuador

Salsa is the name for Latin American dances that are danced to salsa music. Salsa is one of the most popular types of Latin dance that is practiced worldwide, and is typically danced with a partner, although there are elements of solo footwork as well. There are several distinct styles of salsa that are danced around the world.

== Origin ==
The term "salsa" (Spanish for "sauce") was popularized in New York in the 1960s and 1970s by Johnny Pacheco, Fania Records, and the Fania All-Stars as an umbrella label for a New York-based form of Afro-Caribbean dance music with roots in Cuba and mid-20th-century New York. Salsa dance developed from a longer lineage of Afro-Cuban and Caribbean social dances, especially Son cubano, danzón, mambo, cha-cha-chá, and rumba.

Salsa's movement vocabulary reflects both African-derived and European-derived influences. African and Afro-Cuban traditions contributed polyrhythmic movement, body isolations, grounded footwork, improvisation, and call-and-response interaction, including influences associated with Yoruba, Bantu, rumba, and Santería/Orisha practices. European-derived social dance traditions contributed partner-dance structures, couple formations, and ballroom lineages, especially through Cuban danzón, which developed from European country dance, French contredanse, and Spanish contradanza in contact with African rhythmic and dance practices.

In the United States, modern salsa dance was shaped by Palladium-era mambo and related Latin dances, while also absorbing influences from jazz, swing, hustle, tap, and other U.S. social and stage dance traditions. New York and Los Angeles styles later became internationally influential through dance schools, performance teams, congresses, and commercial salsa instruction. Cuban casino, often called Cuban salsa outside Cuba, developed from related Cuban antecedents such as son, mambo, cha-cha-chá, rumba, and danzón, while retaining a more circular partner-dance structure than the slot-based forms common in New York and Los Angeles styles. As salsa music and dance spread globally, local styles also developed, including salsa caleña in Cali, Colombia, known for fast footwork, high kicks, and influences from Caribbean rhythms, Colombian social dance, and U.S. dances such as jitterbug and boogaloo.

== Description ==
Salsa dance steps can be done individually, but salsa is most popularly known as a partner dance where the lead takes the follower through a series of spins and turn patterns to music. Salsa's tempo ranges from about 150 bpm (beats per minute) to around 250 bpm, although most dancing is done to music somewhere between 160 and 220 bpm. The basic salsa dance rhythm consists of taking three steps for every four beats of music. Salsa dancers can also break apart to dance solo, known as "shines".

The two main styles of partnered salsa dancing are linear and circular. In linear salsa, dance couples remain in their "slot", with each dancer switching places from one side of the slot to the other, similar to West Coast Swing—New York–style salsa and LA-style salsa are both danced this way. The second style of partnered salsa dancing is circular salsa. Here, dancers circle around each other, reminiscent of East Coast Swing. Both Cuban and Colombian salsa follow this circular pattern.

Incorporating other dance styling techniques into salsa dancing has become very common for both men and women: foot work, arm work, body movement, spins, body isolations, shoulder shimmies, body rolls, hand styling, acrobatics, and even lifts.

== Venues ==
Salsa dance socials are commonly held in night clubs, bars, ballrooms, restaurants, and outside, especially if part of an outdoor festival. Festivals are held annually, often called a salsa congress, in various host cities aimed to attract a variety of salsa dancers from other cities and countries.

== Styles ==
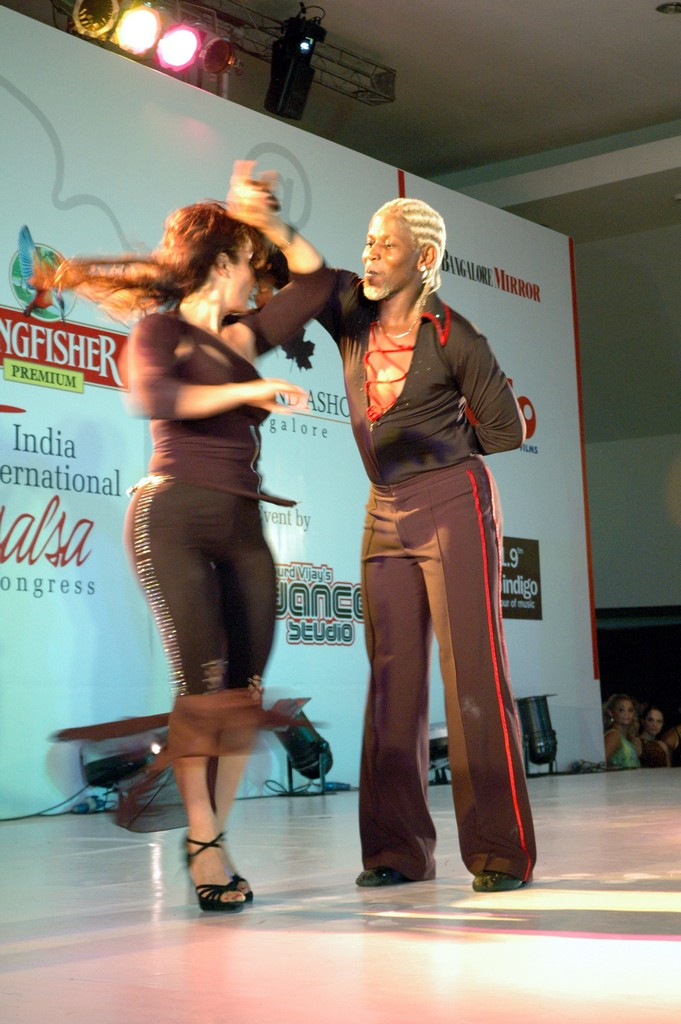
International Salsa Congress, 2004 at Bangalore

Video demonstrating salsa dancing fundamentals

Over the years, many different styles of salsa dancing have evolved around the world. Many of them are compatible with each other, but others are different enough to make dancing between dancers of different styles difficult.

Salsa has many similarities with other partner dances, the styles and skills learned in salsa can be applied to other partnered dances like Bachata or West Coast Swing. Incorporating other dance styling techniques into salsa dancing has also become common, with dancers incorporating styles and movements from dance styles such as ballet and hip hop to create new fusions of dance styles.

=== New York style ===
"On 2" style salsa originated in New York and is often referred to as New York style. It is a linear form of salsa, where dancers dance in a slot, similar to LA style salsa. Unlike other styles of salsa, however, New York style is danced on the second beat of the music ("on 2"), and the follower, not the leader, steps forward on the first measure of the music. There is also often a greater emphasis on performing "shines" in which dancers separate themselves and dance solo with intricate footwork and styling—a phenomenon that likely has origins from Swing and New York Tap.

New York style is the first style of salsa to emerge following the birth of salsa music in New York, and is a mixture of Cuban dances, such as mambo, son, pachanga, and rumba as well as American dances such as swing and tap.

One of the most influential figures in New York style salsa is Eddie Torres (known as "the Mambo King"), who is credited with helping to formalize the on 2 salsa timing (based on the tumbao rhythm) and helping to popularize it by teaching it in dance studios in New York and through early instructional tapes.

=== Los Angeles style ===
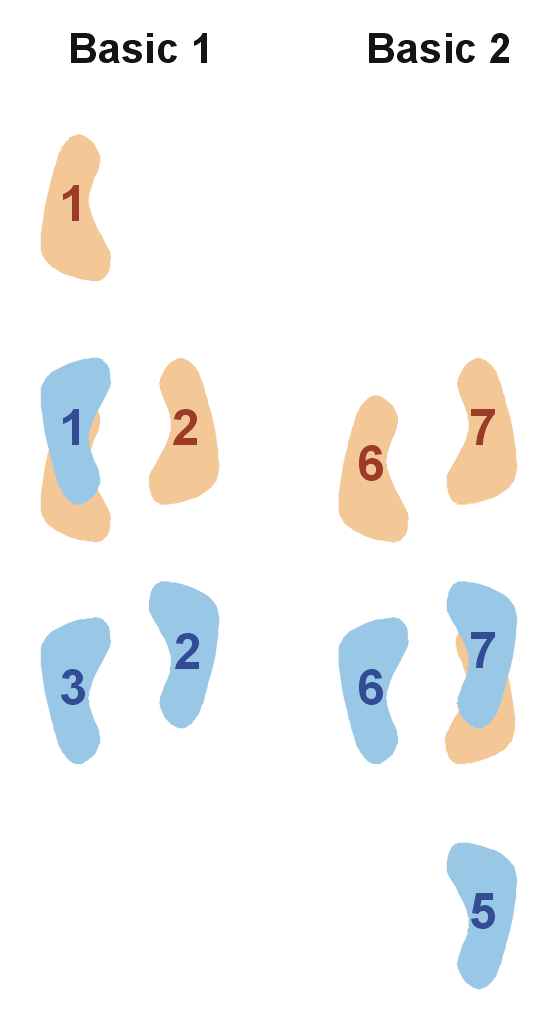
Basic step for LA style, with leader's steps in blue

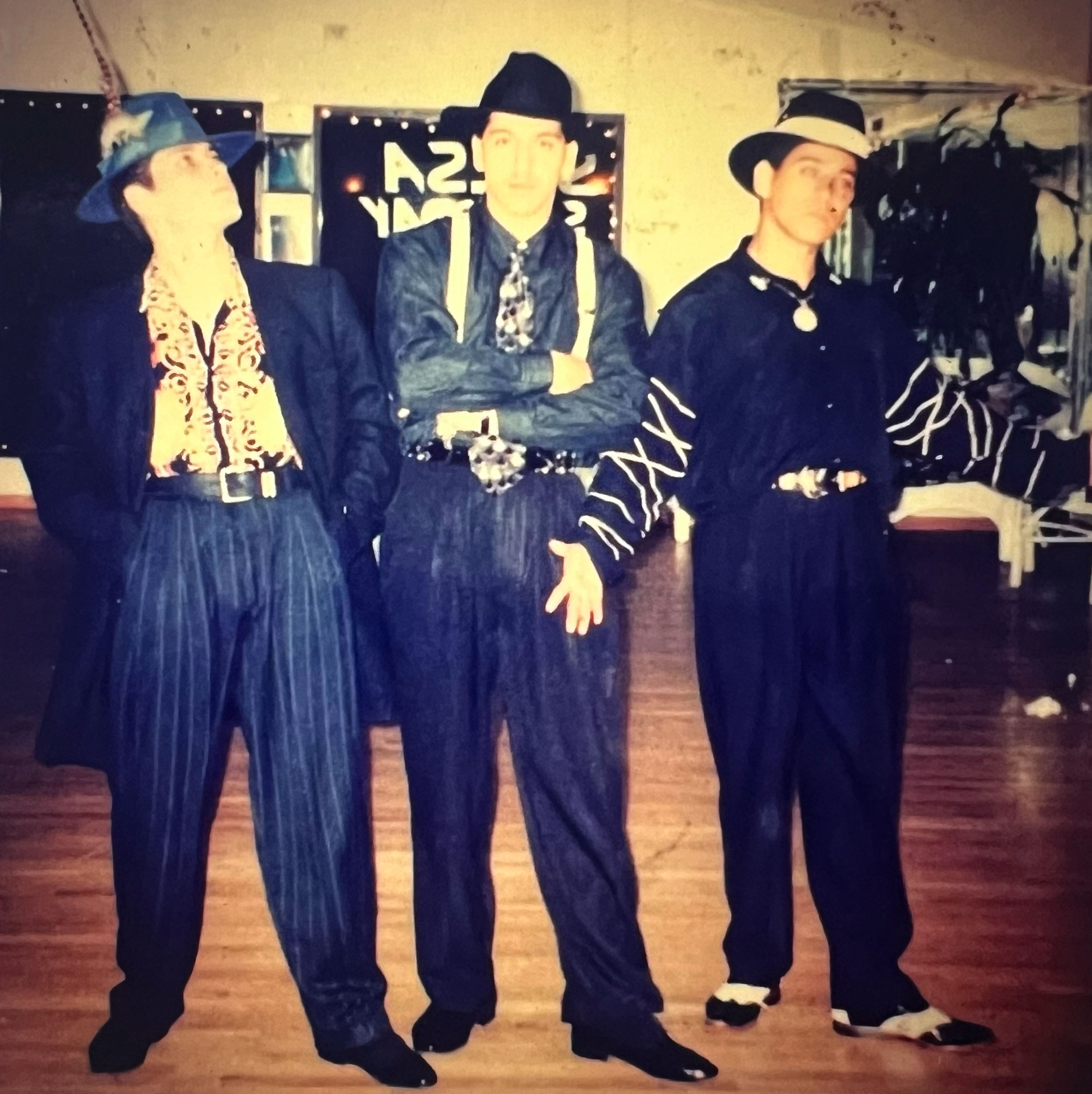
Luis Vazquez, Rogelio Moreno & Francisco Vazquez

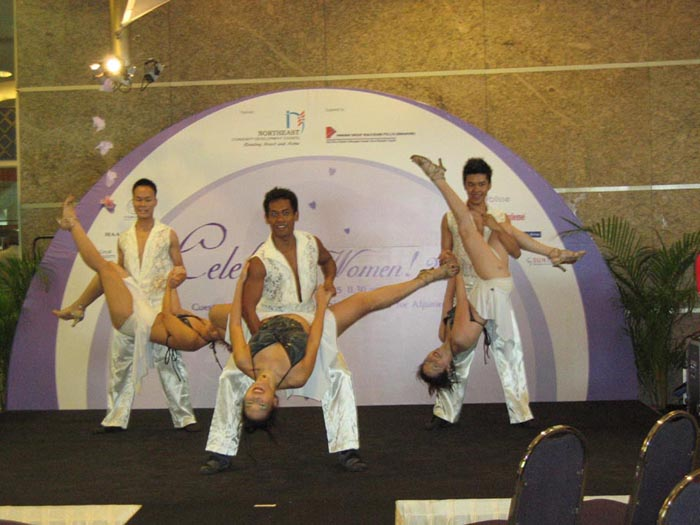
Salsa show dancing

Los Angeles style salsa (LA style) is danced "on 1" where dancers break forward on the first beat of the music, in contrast to New York style which is danced on 2. LA style salsa is danced in a line or "slot" with dancers exchanging positions throughout the dance, unlike Cuban salsa which is danced in a more circular fashion.

The two essential elements of this dance are the forward–backward basic step and the cross-body lead. In this pattern, the leader steps forward on 1, steps to the right on 2–3 while turning 90 degrees counter-clockwise (facing to the left), leaving the slot open. The follower then steps straight forward on 5–6 and turns on 7–8, while the leader makes another 90 degrees counter-clockwise and slightly forward, coming back into the slot. In total, the couple turned 180° with the follower and leader switching places.

The "Vazquez Brothers" (Luis Vazquez, Francisco Vazquez, Johnny Vazquez and Rogelio Moreno) are credited for the early development and growth of LA Style.

Luiz Vazquez was the co-founder of Los Angeles's first salsa dance team, Salsa Brava. The Vazquez Brothers drew influence from stage dances such as tap dance and helped develop LA style's reputation for flashy moves and acrobatics.

Other prominent figures in LA style salsa include salsa promoter Albert Torres, who created the LA Salsa Congress, the first salsa congress in the United States and for many years one of the largest salsa events in the world. Other well-known LA-style dancers include Alex Da Silva and Liz Lira, who have choreographed for Dancing With The Stars.

=== Cuban style ===
In Cuba, a popular dance known as Casino was marketed as Cuban-style salsa or Salsa Cubana abroad to distinguish it from other salsa styles when the name was popularized internationally in the 1970s. The name Casino is derived from the Spanish term for the dance halls, "Casinos Deportivos" where much social dancing was done among the better-off, white Cubans during the mid-20th century and onward.

Historically, Casino traces its origin as a partner dance from Cuban Son, Cha Cha Cha, Danzón and Guaracha. Cuban salsa dancers also often incorporate Afro-Cuban dance movements such as Guaguancó and Columbia into their dancing, a practice which has grown in popularity in other salsa dance styles as well.

=== Rueda de Casino ===
In the 1950s, Rueda de Casino (also known as "Salsa Rueda") was developed in Havana, Cuba. Pairs of dancers form a circle ("Rueda" in Spanish means "Wheel"), with dance moves called out by one person. This style of salsa is danced as a group, rather than as just a couple, and many of the moves involve rapidly swapping partners.

There are different forms of Salsa Rueda, the most prominent being "Rueda de Miami" which originated in the 1980s from Miami. The style mixes Rueda de Cuba and North American dance styles, with some calls reflecting American culture (e.g. Coca-Cola, Dedo, Adios) which are not found in the traditional Cuban-style Rueda.

=== Colombian / Cali style ===
Cali-Style Salsa, also known as Colombian Salsa and Salsa Caleña, originated in the Colombian City of Cali. Cali is also known as the "Capital de la Salsa" (Salsa's Capital), due to salsa music being the main genre in parties, nightclubs, and festivals in the 21st century. It is also worth noting that Cali's style of Salsa has been heavily influenced by the nature of its social scene, where in the 90s most nightclubs, named Disoctecas after the record discs used to play older Salsa music, had a period of time where they would transform into a Viejoteca, a nickname for point of time in which nightclubs would play the Salsa equivalent of Golden Oldies.

The elements of Cali-Style Salsa were strongly influenced by dances to Caribbean rhythms which preceded salsa, such as Pachanga and Boogaloo. Cali has the highest number of salsa schools and salsa teams in the world. Many of the competitions are held in Colombia.

The central feature is the footwork, which has quick, rapid steps and skipping motions called "repique". Colombian salsa performers are also known for including various acrobatics and stunts.

== Research situated in salsa dancing ==
Academic researchers have used salsa dancing as a productive research site in the social and natural sciences. For example, researchers in the natural sciences studied the mathematics of salsa dancing moves. In the social sciences, researchers have studied salsa dancing to understand, for example how the Latino identity is connected to salsa dancing. The study of salsa dancing has been studied as a metaphor to understand emotional and cultural economies. Salsa dancing has been shown to manifest "moments of luxury" in which people use hedonistic escapism to leave momentarily the constrains of ordinary normal life. and, researchers have also used salsa dancing to study the ephemerality of social groups.

== See also ==
- Cuban salsa – a popular form of salsa dancing from Cuba
- Mambo – a dance style which heavily influenced salsa dancing
- Palladium Ballroom – a New York City venue that helped popularize Latin music and dance during the 1940s and 1950s
- Rhumba – a ballroom dance that heavily influenced salsa
- Salsa music – the music to which salsa is danced
- World Salsa Championships – a list of international competitions for salsa dancing
