= Kraken en Vivo: Huella y Camino =

Kraken

Studio album by Kraken
- Released: 2003
- Recorded: 2003
- Genre: Heavy metal
- Label: Athenea Producciones

Track and Trail is the name of an album by Colombian group Kraken It was released on October 1, 2003 by Athena Productions.

== Information ==
This album brings a total of twenty songs divided into two discs, including songs like "Crystal Dress", "Fragile in the Wind", "Every Man Is a Story", and "Blue".

== Track listing ==
CD 1

No.	Title	Length
1.	"Una Vez Más"	04:47
2.	"No me hables de amor"	04:27
3.	"Escudo y Espada"	03:56
4.	"Azul"	05:41
5.	"Vestido de Cristal"	3:50
6.	"Hijos del Sur"	05:10
7.	"Silencioso Amor"	05:53
8.	"Palabras que Sangran"	4:07
9.	"Revolución (bonus track)"	04:56
10.	"Frágil al Viento 2005 (bonus track)"	06:03

CD 2

No.	Title	Length
1.	"Aves Negras"	04:47
2.	"Soy Real"	04:27
3.	"Muere Libre"	03:56
4.	"Déjame"	05:41
5.	"Lágrimas de Fuego"	3:50
6.	"Lenguaje de mi Piel"	05:10
7.	"Soy"	05:53
8.	"Todo Hombre es una Historia"	4:07
9.	"El Idioma del Rock"	04:56
10.	"Corazón Felino (bonus track)"	06:03
