= Mercadonegro =

- Genre: Salsa
- Occupation: Band
- Years active: 2002-present

Mercadonegro (meaning "Black Market" in Spanish) is a Latin American salsa music group. Their debut album was released in 2002 from Bibomusic.

== Use in dance performances ==
The uptempo music of Mercadonegro makes many of its songs a popular choice in salsa dancing performances and competitions. The song "La Malanga" from their 2005 album "Salsa Pa'l Mundo Entero" was the most popular song at the 2012 World Latin Dance Cup, leading to the song being banned from the 2013 competition. "La Bendición" is another popular song from the group, which has also been banned from the World Latin Dance Cup for 2014. The song was also used by John & Andrew in the quarterfinals of season 9 of America's Got Talent.

== Discography ==
Báilalo! [Bibomusic 2002]

  1. Mercadonegro llegó
  2. Tú me quieres pa' bien
  3. Regresaré
  4. ...Eso me duele (single)
  5. Tengo que decírselo
  6. Ibarreña
  7. La mujer que tengo
  8. Salsa pa'l bailador
  9. Yo se que es mentira
 10. Tributo an Eddie Palmieri
 11. La chica del barrio
 12. No hace falta tanto

Salsa Pa'l Mundo Entero [Bibomusic 2005]

  1. La bendición
  2. La guarachera de Cuba (homenaje a Celia Cruz)
  3. Jamas
  4. Llego la hora
  5. A los orishas
  6. Pa'l callao
  7. Por una noche contigo
  8. La malanga
  9. Yo soy el son
 10. El negro
 11. Tu me gustas
 12. Aquí esta mercadonegro

La salsa es mi vida, 2017

1. Aquí Llegamos
2. Sin Cuero No Hay Salsa
3. Hay Amores
4. Pegaito
5. La Salsa Es Mi Vida
6. Pa Mi Colombia
7. Yo Que Jure
8. Chisme De Esquina
9. La Salsa De Ayer
10. Dime Que Si
11. Por El Bien De Los Dos
12. Pa Los Rumberos
13. Te Lo Pido De Rodillas
14. Homenaje A La Música Cubana (feat. Alexander Abreu)
