= Kraken I + II =

Kraken

Compilation album by Kraken
- Released: 1994
- Recorded: 1994
- Genre: Heavy metal
- Label: Codiscos

Kraken I + II is a compilation album by the Colombian heavy metal band Kraken. It was released on February 3, 1994 by Codiscos.

== Information ==
This album brings together twelve songs from the band's first two albums, including "Vestido de Cristal" (Crystal Dress), "No me hablas de amor" (Do Not Speak of Love), "Todo hombre es una historia" (Every Man is a Story) and "Escudo y Espada" (Shield and Sword).

== Track listing ==
No.	Title	Length
1.	"Todo hombre es una historia"	04:47
2.	"No me hables de amor"	04:27
3.	"Muere Libre"	03:56
4.	"Escudo y espada"	05:41
5.	"Nada ha cambiado aún"	3:50
6.	"Soy real"	05:10
7.	"Camino a la Montaña Negra"	05:53
8.	"Aves negras"	4:07
9.	"Vestido de Cristal"	04:56
10.	"Después del Final"	06:03
11.	"Al Caer las Murallas"	06:28
12.	"Los misterios no hablan"	04:03
