= Adrián Iaies =

Argentine pianist and composer (born 1960)

Adrián Iaies (born November 4, 1960) is an Argentine pianist and composer who has been nominated for the Latin Grammy awards three times. His main style is jazz but he combines that with soul, tango, and other styles.

Iaies became involved in jazz fusion in the mid-1980s. His 1999 album Las Tardecitas de Minton's ("Evenings at Minton's"), received a nomination for a Latin Grammy.
