= Wilson Fonseca =

Brazilian composer

Wilson Dias da Fonseca, Wilson Fonseca or Maestro Isoca (17 November 1912 – 24 March 2002) was a Brazilian maestro, composer, conductor and writer. He was born in Santarém, Pará, and died in Belém, aged 89. He was particularly known for his support of Amazonian culture and history, his founding of the Paraense Academy of Music, and his membership in the Paraense Academy of Letters.

He composed over 1,600 songs, many inspired by folk themes and the natural beauty of his home state. In 1994, a music school in the city of Santarém was named after him.

== Principal works ==
- "Hymn of Santarém" ("Hino de Santarém").
- "One Poem of Love" ("Um Poema de Amor").
- "Land Beloved" ("Terra Querida").
- "Legend of Bouto" ("Lenda do Boto").
- "500 Years America" - symphonic poem (1992).
- "Blue Tapajós" ("Tapajós Azul") - waltz.
- "Amazonian Symphony" ("Sinfonia Amazônica").
- "Vitória-Régia, O Amor Cabano" - opera.
