= Un Canto de México =

2002 live album by Alejandro Fernández

Live album by Alejandro Fernández
- Released: 5 November 2002
- Recorded: 2002
- Venue: Palacio de Bellas Artes (Mexico City, Mexico)
- Genre: Orchestral pop, mariachi
- Length: 51:29 (CD1); 48:41 (CD2)
- Label: Sony Discos

Alejandro Fernández chronology
Orígenes (2001)	Un Canto de México (2002)	Niña Amada Mía (2003)

Professional ratings
Review scores
Source	Rating
Allmusic	2.5/5 stars

Un Canto de México (Song of Mexico; also known as 100 Años de Música Mexicana, 100 years of Mexican music; and Bellas Artes En Vivo, Fine Arts in concert) is the tenth album by Mexican singer Alejandro Fernández. It was recorded during a performance in the concert hall of the "Palacio de Bellas Artes". The concert paid tribute to Mexico's greatest singers and songwriters of some of the great Mexican songs of the last century.

== Track listing ==
=== CD1 ===
1. Obertura "Las Tres Raíces" (Eduardo Magallanes, Juventino Rosas, Antonio Soler) – 1:26
2. Alejandra (Enrique Mora) – 3:20
3. Nunca (Guty Cárdenas, Ricardo López Méndez) – 2:42
4. Morenita Mía (Armando Villarreal) – 3:34
5. Júrame(María Grever) – 4:23
6. Norteña De Mis Amores (Ricardo García Arellano) – 1:48
7. Ojos Tapatíos (José Elizondo Sagredo, Fernando Méndez Velázquez) – 3:30
8. Popurrí Agustín Lara (Noche De Ronda, Solamente Una Vez) (Agustín Lara) – 5:42
9. Granada (Agustín Lara) – 5:15
10. Popurrí Boleros (Reloj, El Andariego, Cuando Ya No Me Quieras, Si Dios Me Quita La Vida, Perfidia, Bonita, Luz y Sombra) (Roberto Cantoral; Álvaro Carrillo; Los Cuates Castilla; Luis Demetrio; Alberto Domínguez; Luis Alcaráz; Rafael Cárdenas, Rubén Fuentes) – 12:22
11. Como Yo Te Amé (Armando Manzanero) – 3:21
12. Bésame Mucho (Consuelo Velázquez) – 4:06

=== CD2 ===
1. Ella (José Alfredo Jiménez) – 1:59
2. De Un Mundo Raro (José Alfredo Jiménez) – 3:35
3. Cuando El Destino (José Alfredo Jiménez) – 2:30
4. Popurrí Bravío (Tú, Sólo Tú; Fallaste Corazón, Pelea De Gallos, Juan Charrasqueado, Cielo Rojo, No volveré) (Felipe Valdés Leal; Cuco Sánchez; Juan S. Garrido; Víctor Cordero; Juan Zaizar; José Alfredo Jiménez) – 9:04
5. Amanecí Entre Tus Brazos (José Alfredo Jiménez) – 3:29
6. Paloma Querida (José Alfredo Jiménez) – 1:34
7. Serenata Huasteca (José Alfredo Jiménez) – 1:51
8. Popurrí Vicente Fernández (Las Llaves De Mi Alma, Por Tu Maldito Amor, Mujeres Divinas, De Qué Manera Te Olvido) (Vicente Fernández; Federico Méndez; Martín Urieta; Federico Méndez) – 7:44
9. Popurrí Juan Gabriel (Ya Lo Sé Que Tú Te Vas, La Differencia, Te Sigo Amando) (Juan Gabriel) – 8:18
10. Huapango (José Pablo Moncayo) – 8:37

== Chart performance ==
Chart (2002–2006)	Peak position
Spanish Albums Chart	59
Billboard Regional Mexican Albums	2
Billboard Top Latin Albums	6
Billboard Heatseekers	26

== Sales and certifications ==
Region	Certification	Certified units/sales
Mexico (AMPROFON)	Platinum+Gold	225,000^{^}
^{^} Shipments figures based on certification alone.
