= El Hombre Misterioso =

Peruvian experimental rock band

- Origin: Lima, Peru
- Genres: Alternative rock, Experimental rock
- Years active: 2002–present
- Labels: A Tutiplén Records, Descabellado Records
- Members: Santiago Pillado; Humberto "Chini" Polar; Gustavo Ugarteche; Fernando Salomón; Alonso del Carpio; Richard Gutiérrez; Alejandro Wangeman
- Past members: Rodrigo Ráez; José Luis Salomón

El Hombre Misterioso is a Peruvian rock band formed in 2002 in Lima, Peru. The founding lineup included Santiago Pillado (vocals, drums), Rodrigo Ráez (guitar), José Luis Salomón (bass), and Fernando Salomón (percussion). Their music blends experimental rock, funk, and spoken word, and they are considered one of the most innovative groups in Peru’s alternative scene.

== History ==
The band released their debut album Pez Raro in 2004 on Descabellado Records, establishing their eclectic style. In 2008, they issued The Achorado Sound of El Hombre Misterioso through Nasoni Records in Germany, gaining international attention.

Their third album, Inside the Corporation (2009), was praised for its fusion of funk rock and experimental elements, with the single “La Luna Houston Texas” becoming a cult favorite.

In 2013, they released Ausencia, noted for its introspective tone and concise arrangements. Their self-titled album El Hombre Misterioso (2016) was selected by critics at El Comercio as one of the best Peruvian albums of the year, praised for its reinvention of rhythm and lyrical depth.

== Discography ==
- Pez Raro (2004)
- The Achorado Sound of El Hombre Misterioso (2008)
- Inside the Corporation (2009)
- Ausencia (2013)
- El Hombre Misterioso (2016)

== Music videos ==
- La Luna Houston Texas (2009)
- Sabia Virtud (2016)

== Reception ==
El Hombre Misterioso has been recognized as one of Peru’s most innovative rock bands. Their 2016 self-titled album was chosen by El Comercio as the best Peruvian rock release of the year, praised for its rhythmic reinvention and modern sound. The band’s live performances, including sessions for Ibero 90.9 in Mexico, have been praised for their intensity and spoken-word style.
