= Historia Musical =

Greatest hits album by Los Temerarios
- Released: May 7, 2002
- Genre: Balada, Pop Latino, Romantic music
- Label: Disa Records

Los Temerarios chronology
Baladas Rancheras (2001)	Historia Musical (2002)	Una Lágrima No Basta (2002)

Historia Musical (Eng.: Musical History) is a compilation album released by the romantic music band Los Temerarios with their greatest hits. This album became their second number-one album in the Billboard Top Latin Albums chart.

== Track listing ==
This information from Billboard.com

1. Tu Infame Engaño (Gustavo Angel Alba) — 2:35
2. Tu Me Vas a Llorar (Adolfo Angel Alba) — 2:01
3. Si Quiero Volver (Adolfo Angel Alba) — 1:46
4. La Culpa No Tengo Yo (Adolfo Angel Alba) — 1:39
5. Al Otro Lado del Sol (Albert Hamond) — 1:13
6. Acepta Mi Error (Gustavo Angel ) — 1:23
7. Pequeña (Miguel Angel Alfaro) — 1:42
8. Si Tu Cariño No Está (Adolfo Angel Alba) — 1:53
9. Fueron Tus Palabras (Adolfo Angel Alba) — 1:21
10. Ven Porque Te Necesito (Adolfo Angel Alba) — 1:23
11. La Traicionera (Raymundo Barrios) — 1:38
12. Fue un Juego (Pedro Ulises) — 1:13
13. Dice Adiós Tu Mano Al Viento (Ze Luis) — 1:56
14. Una Lagrima Mas (Adolfo Angel Alba) — 1:41
15. Volveré de mi Viaje (Miguel Angel Alfaro) — 1:47
16. Una Miradita (Miguel Angel Alfaro) — 1:21
17. Dimelo (Adolfo Angel Alba) — 1:30
18. Soy un Solitario (Adolfo Angel Alba) — 1:29
19. Hoy Que Regreso Contigo (Adolfo Angel Alba) — 2:07
20. Faltas Tú (Adolfo Angel Alba) — 2:29

== Chart performance ==
Chart (2002)	Peak position
U.S. Billboard Top Latin Albums	1
U.S. Billboard Regional/Mexican Albums	1
