= Chewaka =

Woreda in the Oromia Region of Ethiopia

Chewaka is one of the woredas in the Oromia Region of Ethiopia. It is part of the Buno Bedele Zone.

== Demographics ==
The 2007 national census reported a total population for this woreda of 56,106, of whom 29,681 were men and 26,425 were women; 1,048 or 1.87% of its population were urban dwellers. The majority of the inhabitants were Moslem, with 94.17% of the population reporting they observed this belief, while 4.53 of the population said they practised Ethiopian Orthodox Christianity, and 1.19% were Protestant.
