= Kraken III =

Kraken

Studio album by Kraken
- Released: 1990
- Recorded: 1990
- Genre: Heavy metal
- Label: Sonolux

Kraken III is the name of the third studio album Colombian group Kraken It was released on January 3, 1990 by Sonolux. The first single from the album was "Rostros Ocultos". The second single was "Lágrimas de Fuego".

== Information ==
This album confirmed the progressive trend of the band. A trend that featured a group identity and a concept of what is Kraken. This album started to show the other bands of the country's ideology which is the National Rock and how it can be strengthened.

== Track listing ==
No.	Title	Length
1.	"Hijos del Sur"	03:49
2.	"Rostros Ocultos"	05:08
3.	"Imperios de Soledad"	03:36
4.	"Seres de Barro y Miedo"	05:58
5.	"Residuo Social"	04:24
6.	"Lágrimas de Fuego"	06:45
7.	"Razones Desnudas"	04:13
8.	"Eres Profecía"	05:25

== Personnel ==
- Elkin Ramírez: vocals, lyrics
- Hugo Restrepo: guitar
- Jorge Atehortua: electric bass
- Gonzalo Vásquez: drums
- Jaime Ochoa Lalinde: keyboards
- Víctor García: producer, live sound engineer
