= Las 30 Cumbias Más Pegadas =

Compilation album by Various artists
- Released: February 5, 2002; 24 years ago
- Genre: Cumbia
- Label: Disa Records

Disa Records chronology
Las 30 Cumbias Más Pegadas (2002)	Las 30 Cumbias Más Pegadas, Vol. 2 (2003)

Las 30 Cumbias Más Pegadas (English: The 30 Best Cumbias) is a compilation album featuring music from Los Angeles Azules, Los Askis, Rayito Colombiano, Grupo Latino, Grupo Maracuya, Los Llayras, Mr. Chivo, Aniceto Molina, Super Grupo G, La Tropa Vallenata, Los Vallenatos, Yahari, among others. This album peaked at number-one in the Billboard Top Latin Albums chart for one week.

== Track listing ==
The track listing from Billboard.com

1. "El Listón De Tu Pelo" (Los Angeles Azules) — 2:11
2. "El Afilador" (Grupo Carabo) — 3:40
3. "Te Digo Vete" (Los Askis) — 3:10
4. "Conga y timbal" (Yaguaru) — 3:39
5. "Amor Carnal" (Chon Arauza y La Furia Colombiana) — 2:17
6. "Todo Me Gusta de Ti" (Aaron y Su Grupo Ilusion) — 2:22
7. "El Poder de Tu Amor" (Grupo Perla Colombiana) — 1:25
8. "Mi Cafetal" (Tropa Vallenata) — 1:42
9. "No Me Castigues" (Aniceto Molina) — 1:53
10. "Cumbia de los Monjes" (Super Grupo G) — 1:14
11. "La Vaca" (Yahari) — 1:14
12. "Vuela Mariposa" (Llayras) — 1:38
13. "La Planta" (Musicalismo Fuego Indio) — 0:57
14. "Lupita" (Mister Chivo) — 1:52
15. "Mi Niña Mujer" (Los Angeles Azules) — 1:50
16. "Canto Por No Llorar" (Angeles De Leo) — 1:29
17. "Lo Tengo Yo" (Grupo Latino) — 2:38
18. "El Baile del Gavilan" (Grupo Maracuya) — 1:28
19. "Perdoname" (Chon Arauza y La Furia Colombiana) — 1:30
20. "Conjuro de Amor" (Hijos Del Doc) — 1:11
21. "Mentiras" (Los Vallenatos De La Cumbia) — 1:29
22. "Sonaja y Tambor" (Llamadores de Catagena) — 1:15
23. "El Reloj Cucu" (Aaron y Su Grupo Ilusion) — 2:17
24. "Que Se Mueran de Envidia" (Hermanos Gutiérrez) — 2:13
25. "Lagrimas de Sangre" (Arturo Jaimes y Los Cantantes) — 1:34
26. "La Alberca" (Yahari) — 1:24
27. "Se Acabó" (Grupo Perla Colombiana) — 1:12
28. "La Bertha" (Kañon) — 1:19
29. "El Tao Tao" (Aniceto Molina) — 1:08
30. "Mi Banana" (J.L.B. y Cia.) — 2:21

== Chart performance ==
Chart (2002)	Peak position
US Billboard Top Latin Albums	1
US Billboard Regional Mexican Albums	1
