= Kraken (band) =

Colombian heavy metal band

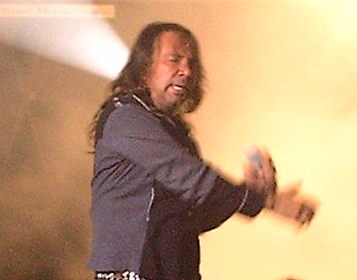

Background information
- Origin: Medellín, Colombia
- Genres: Heavy metal, Hard rock
- Years active: 1984–present
- Labels: Universal Music, Discos Fuentes, Atenea Producciones
- Members: Roxana Restrepo; Andrés Leiva; Ricardo Wolff; Julian Puerto; Luis Ramírez; Rubén Gélvez
- Past members: Elkin Ramírez †; Hugo Restrepo; Jorge Atehortúa; Jaime Tobón; Gonzalo Vásquez †; Gustavo "TavoDrums" Forero; Jorge "Pyngwi" Holguin; Carlos Reyes
- Website: Official website

Kraken is a rock band founded in Medellín, Colombia, in 1983. The current lineup consists of Roxana Restrepo (vocals), Andrés Leiva (guitar), Ricardo Wolff (guitar), Julian Puerto (drums), Luis Alberto Ramírez (bass guitar), and Rubén Gelvez (electronic keyboards).

== History ==
Kraken was founded in Medellín, Colombia in 1983 by vocalist Elkin Ramírez, who led the band for over three decades until his death in 2017.

On 18 December 2013, the band celebrated its 30th anniversary and filmed the show for a DVD that was released the following year.

Ramírez died from brain cancer on 29 January 2017 in Medellín. He was 54 years old.

== Musical style ==
Original lead singer Elkin Ramírez was compared to Freddie Mercury and Bruce Dickinson. He was influenced by Led Zeppelin as well as classical music, which he taught himself upon the advice of his father. Ramirez was commonly referred as "Elkin Kraken" amongst the fans.

Guitarist Andrés Leiva contributed symphonic elements to the band, gained as a student of the classical guitarist Pedro de Alcántara.

== Band members ==
=== Current ===
- Roxana Restrepo – lead vocals (2018–present)
- Andrés Leiva – lead guitar (2004–present)
- Ricardo Wolf – rhythm guitar (2009–present)
- Luís A. Ramirez – bass (2004–present)
- Julián Puerto - Drums (2009-present)
- Rubén Gélvez - Keyboards (2005-present)

=== Former ===
- Elkin Ramírez – lead vocals (1984–2017; died 2017)
- Jorge Atehortúa – bass (1984–1996)
- Gonzalo Vasquez – drums (1984–1991; died 2026)
- Hugo Restrepo – lead guitar (1983-1993)
- Jaime Tobón – rhythm guitar (1984-1985)
- Ricardo Posada – lead guitar (1985-1989)
- Jaime Ochoa – keyboards (1990–1992)
- Felipe Montoya – drums (1991–1996)
- Federico López/Habichuela – lead guitar (1991–1994)
- Henry Borrero – lead guitar (1993-1995)
- Byron Sánchez – lead guitar (1995)
- David Mejia – keyboards (1995-2004)
- Santiago Restrepo – keyboards (1995)
- Luis Guillermo Ramírez – bass (1996-2004)
- Julián Ortiz – bass (1996)
- Alejandro Gutierrez – drums (1996-2004)
- Daniel Pacheco – drums (1996)
- Juan Esteban Echeverri – lead guitar (1996-2005)
- Milton Garcia – keyboards (1996)
- Carlos Cortés – drums (2004-2009)
- Luis Fernando Caballero – keyboards (?)

== Discography ==
=== Studio albums ===
- Kraken I (1987)
- Kraken II (1989)
- Kraken III (1990)
- Kraken IV: Piel de Cobre (1993)
- Kraken V: El Símbolo de la Huella (1995)
- Kraken: Una Leyenda del Rock (1999)
- Humana Deshumanización (2009)
- Sobre esta tierra (2016)
- Kraken VII: Los Pasos Del Titan (2024)

=== Live and compilation albums ===
- Kraken I + II (1994)
- Kraken en Vivo: Huella y Camino (2002)
- Kraken IV + V - Vive el Rock Nacional (2004)
- Kraken Filarmónico (2006)

=== Tributes ===
- Tributo al Titán (2004)
- Tributo Internacional a Kraken (2008)
