= World Salsa Championships =

World Salsa Championships are major international salsa dancing competitions. There are several competitions around the world that claim to be "World Championships" of salsa.

== WSF World Salsa Championships ==
The WSF World Salsa Championships was organized by Isaac and Laura Altman, who formed the World Salsa Federation (WSF) in 2001. The competition was held every year in Miami, with the first competition held in 2002. The competition featured 13 different divisions, including solo, couple, and team competitions, and there were separate age divisions for adults (18+), youths (ages 13–17), and juniors (ages 12 and under).

The WSF was recognized by the Amateur Athletic Union, the largest amateur sporting organization in the U.S., as a governing body for salsa dancing and competition in the US. Isaac and Laura were successful in bringing Salsa and DanceSport as official sports to the AAU Junior Olympic Games in 2002, and Isaac became its National Director.

== World Salsa Open ==
The World Salsa Open is an international salsa competition held every year at the Puerto Rico Salsa Congress. The first competition was held in 2002, and the competition draws a large attendance of competitors from South America.

== World Salsa Championships ==
The World Salsa Championships was created in 2005 by Salsa promoter Albert Torres and a group of other promoters called the "Salsa Seven", and broadcast live on ESPN. Competitions were held in four categories: "On 1", "On 2", "Cabaret" and "Groups", such as "Rueda de Casino", a variation on Cuban style.

The 2008 competition was cancelled due to the 2008 financial crisis, and the last World Salsa Championships were held in 2009, and the competition ceased operations due to financial troubles and a falling out among the event organizers. However, the World Salsa Championships was relaunched under new ownership (World Dance Group) in 2016 from December 9–10 in Atlanta, Georgia. As in previous years, the event was broadcast on the ESPN network. The event was planned to take place every four years following the Olympic format, but the 2020 competition was cancelled due to the pandemic, and the competition hasn't been held since.

== World Latin Dance Cup ==
The first annual WLDC was held in San Diego, with the second competition held in Las Vegas. In 2012 the competition was moved to Miami. In 2016 the competition was moved to Orlando. In 2019 the competition was moved to Medellin, Colombia. The competition moved to an online-only format in 2021 due to the COVID-19 pandemic. The 2023 World Latin Dance Cup has been announced.

== World Salsa Summit ==
The World Salsa Summit was a global salsa competition first held on January 31, 2013 - February 3, 2013. The competition was organized by Katie Marlow, Nelson Flores, and Billy Fajardo (former head judge of the World Latin Dance Cup) and held in Miami with participants from over 45 countries. The last competition was held in 2021 and the event has not been held since due to a falling out of the organizers, some of whom went to start a competing event called The Summit Championship.
