= Una Lágrima No Basta =

Studio album by Los Temerarios
- Released: June 25, 2002
- Genres: Balada, Pop Latino, Romantic music
- Label: Fonovisa

Los Temerarios chronology
Historia Musical (2002)	Una Lágrima No Basta (2002)	20 Inolvidables (2003)

Una Lágrima No Basta (Eng.: A Tear Is Not Enough) is a studio album released by the romantic music band Los Temerarios. This album became their third number-one album in the Billboard Top Latin Albums chart. Only 3 original members are left, Carlos Abrego departs in 2001, and Jonathan Amabilis takes the spot as guitarist and percussionist.

== Track listing ==
All tracks written by Adolfo Ángel Alba

1. Por Qué Será — 3:54
2. Comer a Besos — 3:47
3. Déjame Soñar — 4:45
4. Sé Que Te Amo — 4:06
5. Te Regalo Mi Tristeza — 3:38
6. Una Lágrima No Basta — 4:15
7. Que Tu Vida Es — 3:58
8. Olvidar Así — 3:59
9. Gitana Baila — 4:14
10. No Sé Vivir Sin Tí — 3:43
11. Una Lágrima No Basta (Salsa version) — 3:49
12. Una Lágrima No Basta (Ballad version) — 3:55
13. Una Lágrima No Basta (Dance version) — 5:02
14. Una Lágrima No Basta (Remix-Radio version) — 3:31

== Personnel ==
This information from Allmusic.

- Mayra Angelica Alba — Production coordination
- Oscar Benavides — Direction
- Maggie Vera — Direction
- Santiago Yturria — Direction
- Horacio Marano — Programming, mixing, vocals
- Gabriel Martínez — Engineer, mixing engineer
- Carlos Ceballos — Recording
- Bernie Grundman — Mastering
- Rene Barquet — Engineer, mixing
- Carlos Cabral Jr. — Guitar
- Ramon Estagnado — Guitar
- Robert Flores — Bass guitar
- Norma Hernández — Vocals
- Richard Mochulske — Art Direction, mixing
- Adolfo Pérez Butrón — Photography
- Eduardo Arias — Make-Up

== Chart performance ==
Chart (2002)	Peak position
US Billboard Top Latin Albums	1
US Billboard Regional/Mexican Albums	1
US Billboard Top Independent Albums	4
US Billboard 200	79

== Certifications ==
Region	Certification	Certified units/sales
Mexico (AMPROFON)	Platinum	150,000^{^}
United States (RIAA)	Gold	500,000^{^}
^{^} Shipments figures based on certification alone.
