= Elkin Ramírez =

Colombian singer-songwriter

Elkin Ramirez
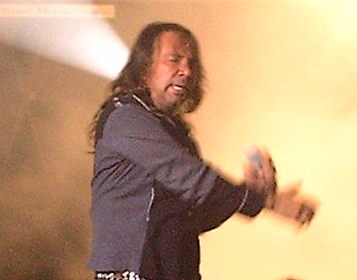
- Ramirez on stage
- Born: 26 October 1962; Medellín, Antioquia, Colombia
- Died: 29 January 2017 (aged 54); Medellín, Antioquia, Colombia
- Occupations: Singer; songwriter; musician
- Years active: 1984–2017
- Website: krakencolombia.net

Elkin Fernando Ramírez Zapata (26 October 1962 – 29 January 2017) was a Colombian singer-songwriter and leader of the heavy metal band Kraken.

Ramírez was born in the Belén neighborhood of Medellín, Antioquia, in October 1962. He was a self-taught artist and joined bands such as Kripzy (1981–1982) and Ferrotrack (1983–1984). In 1985, Ramirez founded Kraken as lead singer. He was the writer and composer of most of the band's songs, concept and lyrics. In 2008, Ramírez debuted as an actor, playing a hit man in the Colombian feature film Cain's Ethic (La Etica de Cain) directed by Edward Ruiz.

Ramírez died from brain cancer on 29 January 2017 in Medellín. He was 54.
