= All My Hits: Todos Mis Éxitos =

Greatest hits album by Selena
- Released: March 9, 1999
- Recorded: 1990–1995
- Studio: Zaz Studios, AMEN Studios, Q-Productions
- Genre: Tejano cumbia; Latin pop
- Length: 1:01:21
- Language: English, Spanish
- Label: EMI Latin
- Producer: A.B. Quintanilla

Selena chronology
Anthology (1998)	All My Hits: Todos Mis Éxitos (1999)	All My Hits: Todos Mis Éxitos Vol. 2 (2000)

All My Hits: Todos Mis Éxitos is a greatest hits album by American singer Selena. It was released posthumously on March 9, 1999, through EMI Latin to commemorate its ten-year anniversary since entering the music industry. The album coincided with the fourth anniversary of Selena's death, though then-president Jose Behar rebuffed the idea that the album was an exploitive ploy by the company. Following Selena's death on March 31, 1995, Abraham Quintanilla expressed his interest in preserving his daughter's memory through her works. Selena's family has been criticized by fans and the media for exploiting the singer and cannibalizing her murder by commercializing her repertoire. According to the singer's brother, A.B. Quintanilla, one of Selena's wishes was for her to "never go away", citing a conversation he shared with Selena and their sister Suzette Quintanilla, that if anything were to happen to any one of them, their wish would be to continue on with their music.

By 1999, Selena remained EMI Latin's top-selling act, outselling living musicians, and contributed to the company's dominance in the United States Latin music market. Behar wanted to release a commemorative album that would help continue to preserve Selena's music. He based his marketing strategy on Capitol Nashville's The Hits (1994) by Garth Brooks. He figured that a limited distribution run of three months and including a pin bearing Selena's name would generate interest. Lupe de la Cruz, marketing director for EMI Latin, believed the included pin would distinguish it from previous releases that contain unreleased material. A direct-TV campaign was headed by Castilian Music on English and Spanish-language networks in the United States, the first of its kind for a Latin album.

The recording includes 16 previously released songs that range from Selena's second studio album Ven Conmigo (1990) to the posthumous 1997 Selena movie soundtrack. The album received a mixed reception among music critics, John T. Davis called the recording a solid release and applauded its wide marketing, though found it to be of no value to die-hard fans and found the quality subpar in comparison to its predecessors. All My Hits: Todos Mis Éxitos peaked at number one on the US Billboard Top Latin Albums and Regional Mexican Albums chart, selling 25,380 units on its first week of availability. It also peaked at number 54 on the Billboard 200 chart. The album provided Selena with her fifth number one album on the Top Latin Albums chart, the most of any artist at that time. All My Hits: Todos Mis Éxitos was the second-highest sold Latin album for the first quarter of 1999, despite its two months' availability. All My Hits: Todos Mis Éxitos ended 1999 as the top Regional Mexican Album of the year while ranking as the third-most sold album on the Top Latin Albums chart.

The recording provided Selena with her second consecutive album to place atop the year-end chart for the Regional Mexican Albums category, following Anthology (1998). All My Hits: Todos Mis Éxitos sold 360,000 units by mid-December, contributing 40% of EMI Latin's cumulative units sold in the United States. The record company posted a sales gain for the first time since Selena's death in 1995, as a result of All My Hits: Todos Mis Éxitos. In 2017, the album was certified diamond (Latin) by the Recording Industry Association of America (RIAA), denoting 600,000 units consisting of sales and on-demand streaming. All My Hits: Todos Mis Éxitos has sold 100,000 units in Mexico, and received a platinum certification by Music Canada for selling 100,000 units. The album was proceeded by a VHS tape of the singer's music videos and All My Hits: Todos Mis Éxitos Vol. 2 (2000).

== Background ==
On March 31, 1995, American Tejano music singer Selena was shot and killed. The crossover-planned album Dreaming of You was released posthumously on July 18, 1995, debuting and peaking atop the United States Billboard 200 albums chart, the first majority Spanish-language recording to do so in the chart's history. The album's release started a "buying frenzy" for anything related or containing Selena among Hispanic and Latino Americans. The releases of Selena's works continue a promise Abraham Quintanilla told his family following his daughter's death, that he will continue to keep Selena's memory alive through her music. According to A. B. Quintanilla, Suzette Quintanilla, and Selena collectively agreed that if anything were to happen to any one of them, their wish would be to continue on with their music. A. B. said that one of Selena's wishes was for her to "never go away". Since Selena's death, her family has been criticized by fans and the media for exploiting the singer and cannibalizing on her murder by commercializing her repertoire.

By 1999, Selena remained EMI Latin's top-selling artist, outselling living musicians such as Thalía and Carlos Ponce. In the past five years, Selena has been the record company's top-selling performer, according to Nielsen SoundScan. Then-president of EMI Latin Jose Behar, who discovered the singer at the 1989 Tejano Music Awards, recognized Selena for her contributions that made EMI Latin "the house that Selena built". Industry executives collectively agreed on Selena's impact on EMI Latin, they credited Selena with propelling the label to the top of the US Latin music industry.

== Music ==
The album contains 16 tracks ranging from Selena's second studio album Ven Conmigo (1990) to the posthumous 1997 movie soundtrack. Offering listeners many of the singer's most recognizable songs, the recording starts off with "Amor Prohibido". It is followed by the mariachi track "Tú Sólo Tú", originally intended for the Don Juan DeMarco soundtrack, which was shelved by music producers. Following the impact of Selena's death, Christopher John Farley of Time magazine, wrote how the producers were most likely regretting their decision. The next track "Como la Flor", became Selena's signature song with essayist Ilan Stavans suggesting the emergence of Latin pop in the United States in the 1990s is attributed to the popularity of "Como la Flor". The fourth song on the album, "I Could Fall in Love" was previously on the planned crossover album Dreaming of You. The fifth track, "El Chico del Apartamento 512", is a lighthearted and comical song following the protagonist's attempts at finding "the guy in apartment 512" (this track was also included in the volume 2 of All My Hits: Todos Mis Éxitos). This was followed by "¿Qué Creias?", a song Selena often performed onstage with a male volunteer from the audience who portrayed her former lover, while Selena scorches them as the wronged partner. The seventh track, "Baila Esta Cumbia" was written following a medley A. B. had in his head while resting. "Dreaming of You" was among a selection of songs Selena was provided with from Capitol Records to choose from, the label vehemently controlled the entire crossover project and only allowed Selena to choose one song of her choice from this selection.

Track number eight, "Bidi Bidi Bom Bom" was improvised during a rehearsal starting off as a song with few, if any, lyrics. Selena started singing, coming up with lyrics "as ideas came to her". It started off with lyrics about a cheerful fish swimming freely in the ocean, which Astudillo likened to a nursery rhyme, organized around a wah-wah guitar riff using a crybaby improvised by Selena's husband and the guitarist of the group Chris Pérez. "Bidi Bidi Bom Bom" transitioned into a cumbia and reggae song, its onomatopoeic title and its nonsensical lyrics suggest the sound of a woman's heart palpitating for the object of her affection. The following track, "La Llamada" follows the protagonist's former lover calling her and protesting his innocence, not buying his excuses, she tells him to refrain from calling her again. The eleventh song, "No Me Queda Más", was penned by keyboardist Ricky Vela, who had romantic inclinations toward the drummer of the group, Suzette, which he kept private from her. After hearing of her wedding to Bill Arriaga in September 1993, Vela wrote of his feelings of betrayal and unrequited love and hid the lyrics that he wrote based on these feelings. Vela eventually provided Selena with the lyrics and she recorded the song for Amor Prohibido. According to Abraham, Selena provided an emotional delivery while recording the track and was seen sobbing in the recording studio because "she knew how [Vela] felt" about Suzette.

The next song, "I'm Getting Used to You" was written by Diane Warren and produced by Rhett Lawrence. Writing for Newsday, Ira Robbins found the track's arrangement to be "slightly outdated" that masked any indications of Selena's Hispanic background. This was dramatized by Christian Serratos in the Netflix two-part limited drama Selena: The Series (2020–21), where the singer felt a sense of dissociation with the song. Warren commented that the scene was not how she recalls her time with Selena, who in reality loved the song. This was followed by "La Carcacha", which was inspired by a broken-down car in Ovalo, Texas. Biographer Joe Nick Patoski recognized that "La Carcacha" contained lyrics of teenage love that Selena never experienced. He wrote how A. B. would sometimes ask Selena about songs he should write for her, and Selena would request songs with storylines atypical of what she experienced. The fourteenth track on the album, "Disco Medley", is a medley of disco-era songs "Last Dance" (1978) and "On the Radio" (1979) by Donna Summer, "The Hustle" (1975) by Van McCoy and the Soul City Symphony, and "I Will Survive" (1978) by Gloria Gaynor and "Funkytown" (1979) by Lipps Inc. "Disco Medley" was performed live at the Houston Astrodome on February 26, 1995, cited as her last concert before she was murdered. Track number fifteen, "No Debes Jugar" was originally released as one of the studio tracks on Selena Live!. "Missing My Baby" finishes the tracklisting of All My Hits: Todos Mis Éxitos.

== Promotion and release ==
On February 8, 1999, it was revealed that All My Hits: Todos Mis Éxitos would be commercially available on March 9. It was hailed as the final release by the singer for the millennium. The album marked EMI Latin's 10th anniversary in operation as a subsidy of Capitol Records. All My Hits: Todos Mis Éxitos also coincided with the fourth anniversary of Selena's death. EMI Latin rebuffed the idea that the album was an exploitive ploy on their part, citing that All My Hits: Todos Mis Éxitos was originally planned for a January release, but was delayed due to packaging issues. Behar wanted to release a commemorative album that was exceptional and would help continue to preserve Selena's music. He decided on mirroring Capitol Nashville's marketing strategy for Garth Brooks's The Hits (1994). He issued All My Hits: Todos Mis Éxitos for a limited distribution release of three months and provided consumers who ordered the album through their TV advertisements, with a commemorative pin bearing Selena's name. Those who order the cassette variant from the direct-TV ads would receive the commemorative pin, while the CD version in-stores will include the pin. Behar wanted the album to be a collector's item and marketed All My Hits: Todos Mis Éxitos as containing a majority of Selena's hit singles. TV advertisements were released throughout the United States on March 15 through English and Spanish-language networks. Behar negotiated with network executives to push All My Hits: Todos Mis Éxitos and promised a cut of the profits that were generated from the advertisements. John Lannert of Billboard called the direct-TV campaign the first of its kind. The first two networks to air the advertisements were cable channels Gems TV and Spanish-language channel Galavisión. Other Spanish-language channels such as Telemundo and Univision jumped on the campaign as well. English-language networks that participated included Lifetime, The Nashville Network, MTV, and VH1. The direct-TV campaign was headed by Castilian Music, who previously done Pure Moods for Virgin Records.

Lupe de la Cruz, marketing director for EMI Latin, hoped that the direct-TV campaign would generate interest. De la Cruz confessed that consumers haven't bought "as much as we would want them to" from previous direct-TV campaigns. He believes that consumers might make a connection when browsing through a music retailer and remembering that they saw All My Hits: Todos Mis Éxitos on TV and might be more inclined to purchase the album. He also hoped that with the push into English-language networks, those who saw the Selena film, might be interested in listening to All My Hits: Todos Mis Éxitos since it contains more of Selena's Tejano music repertoire. Ritmo Latino, a music chain mostly in California, believed the album will be "a strong seller". The company reported that they were supporting All My Hits: Todos Mis Exitos with in-store ads, and radio and print advertisements. The pin bearing the singer's name, provided "every young girl who's already a Selena fan" something they would want. De la Cruz believed that the pin would help distinguish All My Hits: Todos Mis Éxitos from previous Selena releases that contained unreleased material. All My Hits: Todos Mis Éxitos was expected by industry forecasters to debut atop the Billboard Top Latin Albums as well as debut within the higher reaches of the US Billboard 200 charts. On November 2, 1999, EMI Latin released the VHS tape All My Hits: Todos Mis Éxitos on Video. This was followed by All My Hits: Todos Mis Éxitos Vol. 2, a followup album to All My Hits: Todos Mis Éxitos on February 29, 2000, that included a heart-shaped pendant with a picture of Selena inside.

== Critical reception ==
Professional ratings
Review scores
Source	Rating
Allmusic	4/5 stars
Austin American-Statesman	3/5 stars

Writing for the Austin American-Statesman, John T. Davis proclaimed that the release of All My Hits: Todos Mis Éxitos marked the day that Selena had more posthumous releases than those released during her lifetime. Davis noticed an uptick in sales for anything containing Selena during the annual markings of her death and felt that recent releases have suffered in quality in order to meet demand. He found All My Hits: Todos Mis Éxitos as a solid release, containing much of the singer's best songs, though found that it was neither remarkable nor complete of Selena's best works. Davis opined the album for those curious on works done by Selena or casual fans. He found it peculiar that the recording was marketed for die-hard fans and believed that they were the least to benefit from the album. Applauding its wide marketing, Davis concluded that All My Hits: Todos Mis Éxitos misses the mark in the quality afforded by the label.

Alisa Valdes-Rodriguez of the Los Angeles Times believed that All My Hits: Todos Mis Éxitos, as well as her death anniversary, reintroduced Americans to Selena. Abraham was inundated with reporters worldwide on the well-being of the family, reporting that he feels horrible, though less so compared to the day of Selena's death. Abraham reported that his family's pain "comes and goes". Valdes-Rodriguez suggested that these feelings would be less severe if All My Hits: Todos Mis Éxitos did not mark her death anniversary, calling it just "another tribute album". Writing for Newsday, Richard Torres believed that the album encapsulates Selena's versatility, calling the collection a "sharp compendium". He named the release as one of the "movers and shakers" that marked Latin music in 1999. Joey Guerra of the Houston Chronicle, ranked All My Hits: Todos Mis Éxitos as one of the best Selena albums and called it the first recording to contain the singer's signature songs.

== Commercial performance ==
As a result of some retailers releasing the album ahead of its debut, All My Hits: Todos Mis Éxitos debuted at number 24 on the Top Latin Albums chart on the week ending March 20, 1999. The album peaked at number one on the Top Latin Albums and Regional Mexican Albums chart the following tracking week. It received the greatest album sales gain for any Latin album on the chart from the previous tracking week. All My Hits: Todos Mis Éxitos unseated Ricky Martin's Vuelve from the top spot. Selena and Martin's albums contributed the most to the 167,500 units measured by Nielsen SoundScan of Latin albums sold in the United States for that week. The album became Selena's fifth number-one album on the Top Latin Albums chart, the most any artist has placed on the chart, at that time. All My Hits: Todos Mis Éxitos debuted at number 59 on the Billboard 200 chart selling 25,380 units in its first week of availability. All My Hits: Todos Mis Éxitos provided Selena with 73 cumulative weeks atop the Top Latin Albums chart, extending her record for most logged weeks on the chart for any artist, at that time.

EMI Latin shipped 500,000 units to retailers and by April 9, 1999, All My Hits/Todos Mis Éxitos sold 250,000 copies in the five weeks of availability, according to the label. Selena and Martin contributed significantly toward Latin album sales in the first quarter of 1999, with Lannert noticing their respective albums were "blowing through the sales roof". According to Nielsen SoundScan, All My Hits: Todos Mis Éxitos sold 176,705 units by May 22, 1999. The album represented 8% of the 1.5 million copies sold of Latin albums in the United States in the first quarter of 1999. It was the second-highest sold Latin album, behind Martin's Vuelve for the quarter, despite only being available for two months. All My Hits: Todos Mis Éxitos received a platinum certification from Music Canada, selling 100,000 units in the country by June 12, 1999, and received a gold certification from the Recording Industry Association of America (RIAA), denoting 500,000 units shipped in the United States. The album reclaimed the top spot of the Top Latin Albums chart for the week ending June 26, 1999, selling 11,500 units, a 26% increase from the previous week. Lannert called the sales spike surprising, though believed it could have been a result of the impending June 30 deadline, which would end production of the album. Nielsen SoundScan reported that All My Hits: Todos Mis Éxitos sold 207,500 units by June 1999, ranking at number three on their year-to-date Top Latin Albums chart.

By August 21, 1999, All My Hits: Todos Mis Éxitos sold 268,000 units, the second-most sales of a Latin album for the year, behind Martin's Vuelve. Music executives claim that the sales reported by Nielsen SoundScan only cover 30-45% of the Latin music market. The company responded that they believe their coverage is extensive, while Ritmo Latino argues that the actual numbers for Latin music are stagnant and the rise of sales is due to Martin and Enrique Iglesias who sell well in more accessible music retailers that cater to mainstream pop music. EMI Latin albums sold a cumulative 422,000 units, making it the top Regional Mexican imprint and label by August 28, 1999. Selena's All My Hits: Todos Mis Éxitos comprise 69% of those numbers, claiming the top Regional Mexican Artist category during Billboard's recap reports. By October 23, 1999, All My Hits: Todos Mis Éxitos sold 343,000 units, representing the second-largest sales for a Latin album so far for 1999, behind Martin's Vuelve. In October 1999, Latin albums sold in the United States broke 1998's record sales, Martin, Selena, and Elvis Crespo, were the three biggest selling acts during a Nielsen SoundScan report. All My Hits: Todos Mis Éxitos ended 1999 as the top Regional Mexican Album and the third largest-selling Top Latin Album of the year. Her second consecutive album to place atop the year-end chart for the Regional Mexican Albums category, following Anthology (1998). EMI Latin's albums sold 893,000 units, and Selena's album contributed 40% of their revenue, selling 360,000 units by mid-December. In 1999, EMI Latin posted a sales gain for the first time since Selena's death in 1995, as a result of her album All My Hits: Todos Mis Éxitos. All My Hits: Todos Mis Éxitos sold 386,500 units by January 1, 2000, it was the fifth largest-selling album in the United States in 1999. Writing for The Monitor, Vilma Maldonado believed All My Hits: Todos Mis Éxitos sold 600,000 units and claims that Nielsen SoundScan's report does not adequately represent the true number of units sold in the United States. In 2017, the album was certified diamond (Latin) by the RIAA, denoting 600,000 units consisting of sales and on-demand streaming.

== Track listing ==
No.	Title	Writer(s)	Production	Length
1.	"Amor Prohibido" (previously on Amor Prohibido)	Selena Quintanilla-Perez, A.B. Quintanilla, Pete Astudillo	A.B. Quintanilla, Jorge Alberto Pino, Bebu Silvetti, Gregg Vickers	2:48
2.	"Tú Sólo Tú" (previously on Dreaming of You)	Felipe Valdés Lea	José Hernández	3:11
3.	"Como la Flor" (previously on Entre A Mi Mundo)	A.B., Astudillo	A.B.	3:02
4.	"I Could Fall in Love" (previously on Dreaming of You)	Keith Thomas	Thomas	4:41
5.	"El Chico del Apartamento 512" (previously on Amor Prohibido)	A.B., Ricky Vela	A.B.	3:26
6.	"¿Qué Creias?" (previously on Entre a Mi Mundo)	A.B., Astudillo	A.B.	3:30
7.	"Baila Esta Cumbia" (previously on Ven Conmigo)	A.B., Astudillo	A.B.	2:56
8.	"Dreaming of You" (previously on Dreaming of You)	Franne Golde, Tom Snow	Guy Roche	5:21
9.	"Bidi Bidi Bom Bom" (previously on Amor Prohibido)	Selena, Astudillo	A.B.	3:27
10.	"La Llamada" (previously on Selena Live!)	A.B., Astudillo	A.B.	3:10
11.	"No Me Queda Más" (previously on Amor Prohibido)	Vela	A.B.	3:18
12.	"I'm Getting Used to You" (previously on Dreaming of You)	Diane Warren	Rhett Lawrence	4:01
13.	"La Carcacha" (previously on Entre a Mi Mundo)	A.B., Astudillo	A.B.	4:08
14.	"Disco Medley" (previously on Selena: The Original Motion Picture Soundtrack)	Dino Fekaris, Donna Summer, Freddie Perren, Giorgio Moroder, Paul Jabarra, Steve Greeberg, Van McCoy	A.B.	7:41
15.	"No Debes Jugar" (previously on Selena Live!)	A.B., Vela	A.B.	2:48
16.	"Missing My Baby" (previously on Entre a Mi Mundo)	A.B.	A.B.	3:51
Total length:				1:01:21

== Charts ==
=== Weekly charts ===
Chart (1999)	Peak position
US Billboard 200 (Billboard)	54
US Top Latin Albums (Billboard)	1
US Regional Mexican Albums (Billboard)	1

=== Quarterly charts ===
Chart (Q1 1999)	Peak position
US Top Latin Albums	2
US Regional Mexican Albums	1
Chart (Q1 2000)	Peak position
US Top Latin Albums	23

=== Year-end charts ===
Chart (1999)	Peak position
US Top Latin Albums	3
US Regional Mexican Albums	1
Chart (1999) (Note: With the admission of catalog titles.)	Peak position
US Top Latin Albums	5
US Regional Mexican Albums	1
Chart (2000)	Peak position
US Regional Mexican Albums	10

== Certifications and sales ==
Region	Certification	Certified units/sales
Canada	—	100,000
Mexico	—	100,000
United States (RIAA)	Diamond (Latin)	600,000^{‡}
^{‡} Sales+streaming figures based on certification alone.

== Works cited ==
- "RIAA Gold & Platinum". RIAA.com.
- "EMI's Selena Album May Be Final Release". Corpus Christi Caller-Times. February 8, 1999a – via Newspapers.com.
- "Esta Semana en la Musica". El Siglo de Terron. March 29, 1999b. Archived from the original on May 13, 2022.
- "Selena All My Hits: Todos Mis Exitos". Allmusic.
- "2000: The Year in Music". Billboard. Vol. 112, no. 53. December 30, 2000.
- "Diez Anos sin Selena". Milenio (in Spanish) (389–396). Diario de Monterrey: 388–390. March 31, 2005.
- Quintanilla, Selena (1994). Amor Prohibido (Media notes). A.B. Quintanilla (producer), Suzette Quintanilla (spoken liner notes producer). EMI Latin. 724354099403.
- Arrarás, María Celeste (1997). Selena's Secret: The Revealing Story Behind Her Tragic Death. Simon and Schuster. ISBN 0-684-83193-7.
- Cole, Patrick E.; Farley, Christopher John (July 10, 1995). "Old Rock, New Life – Page 2". Time. Archived from the original on November 7, 2012.
- Davis, John T. (March 29, 1999). "Selena Redux is for Curious, Casual Fans". Austin-American Statesman – via Newspapers.com.
- Dreaming of You (Compact disc). Selena. EMI Latin/EMI Records. 1995. 724354096907.
- Falcon, Jaime-Paul (September 21, 2015). "Selena's Family Needs to Stop Tarnishing Her Legacy". Dallas Observer.
- Fletcher, Michael; Getz, Robert P.; Fletcher, Nathan; Morales, Joe (March 1999). "En Persona: Selena". En Persona (in Spanish and English). 60 minutes in. TC Network. Galavision. "Abraham Quintanilla: And when she sang it or recorded it she put all her soul to it. And that she had tears in her eyes, you know, her eyes were watery because she knew how Ricky (Vela) felt. Suzette Quintanilla: I guess "Si Una Vez" because I think Selena really liked to give that attitude in that song."
- Garcia, Ricky; Gamboa, Suzanne (March 15, 2022). "New digitally modified Selena music announcement gets mixed reviews online". Kxan.com.
- Guerra, Joey (November 1, 2017). "The stories behind Selena's legacy and biggest hits". Houston Chronicle. Archived from the original on April 4, 2018.
- Guerra, Joey (March 27, 2020). "Ranking Selena's albums: 'Dulce Amor' to 'Dreaming of You'". Houston Chronicle.
- Lannert, John (February 20, 1999a). "Selena Set Marks EMI Latin's 10th Year". Billboard. Vol. 111, no. 8.
- Lannert, John (March 20, 1999b). "Latin Notas". Billboard. Vol. 111, no. 12.
- Lannert, John (March 27, 1999c). "Latin Notas". Billboard. Vol. 111, no. 13.
- Lannert, John (April 24, 1999e). "Latin Notas". Billboard. Vol. 111, no. 17.
- Lannert, John (May 22, 1999i). "Latin Notas". Billboard. Vol. 111, no. 21.
- Lannert, John (June 26, 1999m). "Latin Notas". Billboard. Vol. 111, no. 26.
- Lannert, John (August 21, 1999o). "Latin Sales Swell in First Half of '99". Billboard. Vol. 111, no. 34.
- Lannert, John (August 28, 1999p). "Por Los Numeros: Year-to-date Charts". Billboard. Vol. 111, no. 35.
- Lannert, John (October 23, 1999s). "Latin Notas". Billboard. Vol. 111, no. 43.
- Lannert, John (November 6, 1999t). "Latin Notas". Billboard. Vol. 111, no. 44.
- Lannert, John (November 12, 1999u). "Latin Notas". Billboard. Vol. 111, no. 45.
- Lannert, John (January 8, 2000a). "Latin Notas". Billboard. Vol. 112, no. 1.
- Lannert, John (January 15, 2000b). "Latin Notas". Billboard. Vol. 112, no. 2.
- Lannert, John (January 22, 2000c). "Latin Notas". Billboard. Vol. 112, no. 3.
- Lannert, John (February 12, 2000d). "Latin Notas". Billboard. Vol. 112, no. 7.
- Lannert, John (April 29, 2000e). "How They're Doing". Billboard. Vol. 112, no. 18.
- Lannert, John; LeBlanc, Larry (June 12, 1999). "Latin Notas". Billboard. Vol. 111, no. 24.
- LeBlanc, Larry (June 12, 1999). "Martin, Lopez Help Pick Up The Pace Of Canada's Latin Beat". Billboard. Vol. 111, no. 12. p. 41.
- Maldonado, Vilma (July 30, 1999). "La Onda". The Monitor – via Newspapers.com.
- Mendoza, Madalyn (March 14, 2022). "Quintanilla family is releasing new Selena album nearly 30 years after the Tejano icon's death". Houston Chronicle.
- Parédez, Deborah (2009). Selenidad: Selena, Latinos, and the Performance of Memory. Duke University Press. ISBN 978-0-8223-9089-3.
- Patoski, Joe Nick (1996). Selena: Como La Flor. Boston: Little Brown and Company. ISBN 0-316-69378-2.
- Patoski, Jose Nick (December 4, 2020). "Dance Away Your 2020 Blues With Selena's Best Songs". Elle.
- Paul, Maria Luisa (March 15, 2022). "More 'Bidi Bidi Bom Bom' to come: Selena's father announces new album nearly 27 years after the singer's death". The Washington Post. Archived from the original on March 15, 2022.
- Perry, Claudia (January 10, 2017). "Selena turns in sultry, sensual performance at Dome". Houston Chronicle.
- Perone, James E. (2012). The Album: A Guide to Pop Music's Most Provocative, Influential, and Important Creations. ABC-CLIO. ISBN 978-0-313-37907-9.
- Ramirez, Erika (October 8, 2011). "Hot Latin Songs Top Artists". Billboard. Vol. 123, no. 35. New York. ISSN 0006-2510.
- Robbins, Ira (July 16, 1995). "Selena's Ironic Farewell". Newday – via Newspapers.com.
- Salazar, Gene (April 30, 1995). "Fiesta '95 Dedicated to Selena". The Victoria Advocate.
- Smoothvega (April 30, 2020). "AB Quintanilla Talks 'Selena' Netflix Series, Announces Final Album, His Career, Legacy + More". YouTube (Podcast). Event occurs at 23:00 (1st), 1:08:00 (2nd), 1:35:00 (3rd).
- Stavans, Ilan (2014). Latin music : musicians, genres, and themes. Santa Barbara, California: Greenwood. p. 923. ISBN 978-0313343957.
- Spenser, Samuel (May 5, 2021). "The true story behind the Diane Warren scene in Netflix's 'Selena'". Newsweek.
- Stavans, Ilan; Augenbraum, Harold (2005). Encyclopedia Latina: History, Culture, And Society In The United States (4th ed.). Danbury, CT: Grolier Academic Reference. ISBN 0-7172-5815-7.
- Torres, Richard (May 2, 1999). "The Best of Selena Lives On". Newsday – via Newspapers.com.
- Torres, Richard (January 2, 2000). "A Year Full of Movers and Shakers". Newsday – via Newspapers.com.
- Valdes-Rodriguez, Alisa (April 9, 1999). "The Resonance of Selena". Los Angeles Times – via Newspapers.com.
- Quintanilla, Selena (1990). Ven Conmigo (Media notes). A.B. Quintanilla (producer). EMI Latin. H1E-42359.
- Verhovek, Sam Howe (April 1, 1995). "Grammy-Winning Singer Selena Killed in Shooting at Texas Motel". The New York Times. p. 1. Archived from the original on July 20, 2016.
- Edward James Olmos (narrator), Jose Behar (executive producer), Abraham Quintanilla (executive producer), Claribel Cuevas (associate producer), Randal J. Edwards (associate producer), Ila von Hasperg (editor), Jeffrey Coulter (producer), Cecelia Miniucchi (director) (April 1, 1997). Selena Remembered (DVD, VHS) (Documentary) (in English and Spanish). Corpus Christi, Texas: EMI Latin Productions, Q-Productions. Event occurs at 53:49.
