= Lo Mejor de...Selena =

Compilation album by Selena
- Released: March 31, 2015
- Recorded: 1988 – 1995
- Genre: Latin pop
- Length: 96:21
- Label: Capitol Latin, Universal Music Latin Entertainment
- Producer: A.B. Quintanilla

Selena chronology
Enamorada de Ti (2012)	Lo Mejor de...Selena (2015)	The Last Concert (2017)

Lo Mejor de...Selena is a double disc compilation album by American singer Selena. It was released posthumously in the United States on March 31, 2015, by Capitol Latin and Universal Music Latin Entertainment. The album was released after the commercial and chart success of Enamorada de Ti (2012), which featured several Latin music acts lending their voices for the remix album. The recording features six number one United States Billboard Hot Latin Songs chart singles by the singer—"Buenos Amigos", "Donde Quiera Que Estés", "Amor Prohibido", "Bidi Bidi Bom Bom", "No Me Queda Más", "Fotos y Recuerdos", and the US Billboard Latin Pop Airplay chart single "I Could Fall in Love".

The album debuted and peaked at number two on the US Billboard Top Latin Albums chart. A year after its release, the recording peaked at number one on the Latin Pop Albums list, giving Selena her first number one album in four years. Lo Mejor de...Selena debuted and peaked at number 102 on the US Billboard 200 chart, her highest-charting album since 1999's All My Hits: Todos Mis Éxitos. The recording earned the singer the Top Latin Albums Artist of the Year, Female at the 2016 Billboard Latin Music Awards. The album has been certified by the Recording Industry Association of America (RIAA) double platinum, denoting 120,000 album-equivalent units.

== Background ==
In March 1995, American Tejano music singer Selena was shot and killed by Yolanda Saldívar, her friend and former manager of the singer's boutiques. The impact of the singer's death had a negative impact on Latin music, her genre—which she catapulted it into the mainstream market—suffered and its popularity waned following Selena's death. She continued to be the last remaining Tejano recording artist to appear on the United States Billboard 200 chart since 2000. (Note: According to author Joe Nick Patoski in 2000, Selena was the last Tejano recording artist to have appeared on the Billboard 200 chart. Her music last appeared on the chart in April 2015 after the release of Lo Mejor de...Selena.) In the fall of 2011, Chilean record producer Humberto Gatica and Capitol Latin senior vice president Sergio Lopes had the idea of turning Selena's songs into duets in popular music genres. Mexican singers Cristian Castro, Samo, American singers Don Omar, Carlos Santana, Selena Gomez (who was named after Selena), and Spanish singer Juan Magan lent their voices for the duet/remix style album. The project—named Enamorada de Ti—was released in April 2012 and debuted and peaked at number one on the U.S. Top Latin Albums and Latin Pop Albums chart. Lo Mejor de...Selena followed the commercial success of Enamorada de Ti, released on the twentieth anniversary of Selena's death. It was also made available for digital download and released as a double disc.

== Songs ==
Lo Mejor de...Selena contains six Billboard Hot Latin Songs chart number one singles by the singer—"Buenos Amigos", "Donde Quiera Que Estés", "Amor Prohibido", "Bidi Bidi Bom Bom", "No Me Queda Más", "Fotos y Recuerdos", and "I Could Fall in Love"—the latter of which peaked at number one on the Billboard Latin Pop Airplay chart. "Como la Flor", Selena's signature song, and "La Carcacha" are both originally on 1992's Entre a Mi Mundo. "Como la Flor" launched her on the Latin music scene, according to journalists. The song was acclaimed by music critics and was credited as Selena's first solo number one single in popular culture despite Billboard's official record of the single peaking at number six. "No Debes Jugar", the lead single from 1993's Live!, and "La Llamada" made the album cut. Sally Jacobs of the Boston Globe called "No Debes Jugar" one of "her cumbia signature songs" and "most popular cumbia song[s]". "Si Una Vez" peaked at number four on the Regional Mexican Songs chart, while "El Chico del Apartamento 512" failed to gain any chart success. "Techno Cumbia" peaked at number four on Billboard's Latin charts.

The second disc of Lo Mejor de...Selena contains ten English-language tracks beginning with "My Love"—written by Selena in 1989. The duet with David Byrne on "God's Child (Baila Conmigo)", the English version of "Donde Quiera Que Estes" called "Wherever You Are", and "Dreaming of You" were originally on Selena's posthumous planned crossover album Dreaming of You (1995). The latter song became the singer's highest charting Billboard Hot 100 single, peaking at number 22 on the chart. It also remains the best-selling single of Selena's musical career, selling over 250,000 digital units. The contemporary R&B ballad "Missing My Baby", the remix version of "My Love" called "Don't Throw Away My Love", and the movie soundtrack songs "Is It the Beat?" and "Disco Medley", were also added to the second disc of the album.

== Commercial reception ==
Mexican newspaper El Diario de Yucatán called Lo Mejor de...Selena an album "that is a recollection of the singer". Terra Chile also called the album a way to "remember and honor the legacy of [Selena]" and said that her "departure still lives in the hearts of her fans." The newspaper called the addition of "Disco Medley" on Lo Mejor de...Selena as having a "new voice on [the] classics" of "I Will Survive", "Funkytown", and "On the Radio".

The album debuted and peaked at number two on the US Billboard Top Latin Albums and Latin Pop Albums chart on the week ending on April 18, 2015. The set also debuted and peaked at number 102 on the US Billboard 200 chart, becoming her fifteenth album to appear on the chart and her highest-charting album since 1999's All My Hits: Todos Mis Éxitos. On the Top Latin Albums chart, Lo Mejor de...Selena became Selena's fifteenth top 10 album on the chart, selling just over 2,000 units in its first week of availability. Due to the anniversary of Selena's death, her total albums sold 9,000 units a 267% increase from the previous week and her digital songs grew 167% to 26,000 copies sold on the same week. Seven of her songs charted simultaneously on the Latin Digital Song Sales chart, the most Selena had ever placed since Billboard began monitoring digital sales for Latin singles in 2010. As of March 2016, Lo Mejor de...Selena continued to chart on the Top Latin Albums and Latin Pop Albums chart for a total of 50 consecutive weeks. Lo Mejor de...Selena finished 2015 as the fourteenth best-selling Latin album and the eighth best-selling Latin pop album. In Mexico, the album peaked at numbers 44 and 18 on the Mexican Albums chart and Mexican Spanish Albums chart, respectively. In the week ending April 23, 2016 and following the twenty-first anniversary of Selena's death, Lo Mejor de...Selena peaked at number one on the Latin Pop Albums chart. The album dethroned Juan Gabriel's Los Dúo, Vol. 2 (2015) album, and was the first number one album by the singer in four years.

Selena received the Billboard Latin Music Awards for Top Latin Albums Female Artist of the Year and was nominated for Latin Pop Albums Solo Artist of the Year as a result of Lo Mejor de...Selena's chart success. After the 2016 Billboard Latin Music Awards nominations were announced, Spanish-language channel Telemundo called Selena a "role model for Latinos" and that her "voice continues to echo and touch the hearts of audiences, regardless of gender."

== Track listing ==
Disc one
No.	Title	Writer(s)	Length
1.	"No Quiero Saber"	A.B. Quintanilla III, Pete Astudillo	2:55
2.	"Baila Esta Cumbia"	Quintanilla III, Astudillo	2:57
3.	"Como la Flor"	Selena Quintanilla, Quintanilla III, Ricky Vela, Astudillo	3:04
4.	"La Carcacha"	Quintanilla III, Astudillo	4:10
5.	"Buenos Amigos" (featuring Álvaro Torres)	Álvaro Torres	4:46
6.	"No Debes Jugar"	Quintanilla III, Vela	2:50
7.	"La Llamada"	Quintanilla III, Astudillo	3:12
8.	"Amor Prohibido"	Selena, Quintanilla III, Astudillo	2:49
9.	"No Me Queda Más"	Vela	3:19
10.	"Fotos y Recuerdos"	Chrissie Hynde, Vela	2:35
11.	"El Chico del Apartamento 512"	Quintanilla III, Vela	3:28
12.	"Bidi Bidi Bom Bom"	Selena, Astudillo	3:29
13.	"Techno Cumbia"	Quintanilla III, Astudillo	3:46
14.	"Si Una Vez"	Quintanilla III, Astudillo	2:45
15.	"Donde Quiera Que Estés" (featuring the Barrio Boyzz)	K. C. Porter, Miguel Flores	4:28
Total length:			48:49

Disc two
No.	Title	Writer(s)	Length
1.	"My Love"	Selena	2:51
2.	"I Could Fall in Love"	Keith Thomas	4:41
3.	"God's Child (Baila Conmigo)"	Selena, David Byrne	4:14
4.	"Dreaming of You"	Franne Golde, Tom Snow	5:23
5.	"Missing My Baby"	Quintanilla III	4:13
6.	"Wherever You Are"	K.C. Porter, Miguel Flores	4:28
7.	"Is It The Beat?"	Quintanilla III	4:09
8.	"Always Mine"	Quintanilla III	3:36
9.	"Don't Throw Away My Love"	Selena	3:00
10.	"Disco Medley"	Freddie Perren, Dino Fekaris, S. Greenberg, Paul Jabbara, Van McCoy, Giorgio Moroder, Donna Summer	6:55
Total length:			41:14

== Commercial performance ==
=== Weekly charts ===
Chart (2015)	Peak position
Mexican Albums (AMPROFON)	44
Mexican Spanish Albums (AMPROFON)	18
US Billboard 200	102
US Top Latin Albums (Billboard)	2
US Regional Mexican Albums (Billboard)	2
Chart (2016)	Peak position
US Latin Pop Albums (Billboard)	1

=== Year-end charts ===
Chart (2015)	Peak position
US Top Latin Albums (Billboard)	14
US Latin Pop Albums (Billboard)	8
Chart (2016)	Peak position
US Top Latin Albums (Billboard)	8
US Latin Pop Albums (Billboard)	5

=== Sales ===
Region	Certification	Certified units/sales
United States (RIAA)	2× Platinum (Latin)	42,000
