= Mis Mejores Canciones – 17 Super Éxitos =

Greatest hits album by Selena
- Released: September 17, 1993
- Recorded: 1989–1992
- Genre: Tejano
- Length: 54:07
- Language: Spanish
- Label: EMI Latin
- Producer: A. B. Quintanilla

Selena chronology
Selena Live! (1993)	Mis Mejores Canciones – 17 Super Éxitos (1993)	Amor Prohibido (1994)

Mis Mejores Canciones – 17 Super Éxitos (English: My Best Songs – 17 Super Hits) is a greatest hits album by American singer Selena released on September 17, 1993, through EMI Latin. Beginning in January 1993, the label released a comprehensive collection that spotlighted its Latin music artists as part of its Latin Classics series. Mis Mejores Canciones – 17 Super Exitos encompasses 17 tracks, ranging from songs recorded on her debut album with EMI Latin, to songs present in Entre a Mi Mundo (1992). The album received a positive response from music critics who enjoyed the label's catalog releases and praised the tracks on the album for showcasing Selena's early popular recordings. Following the shooting death of Selena on March 31, 1995, Mis Mejores Canciones – 17 Super Exitos debuted at number one on the US Billboard Top Catalog Albums chart, the first Spanish-language recording to do so. The Recording Industry Association of America (RIAA) certified the album diamond (Latin), denoting 600,000 units shipped in the United States.

== Background and production ==
Selena y Los Dinos signed with EMI Latin following their appearance at the 1989 Tejano Music Awards. By 1993, the group, led by vocalist Selena, was approaching its pinnacle of success. While backup vocalist and dancer Pete Astudillo embarked on his solo career, he persisted as a member of the group and provided songwriting assistance. Selena's husband and guitarist, Chris Pérez, expressed a growing inclination towards quitting the band. In realizing that within Tejano music guitarists were not given ample room for experimentation, Pérez found himself confined to repetitious chord progressions alongside the band. Sensing a lack of artistic growth, Pérez confided with Selena about his boredom and yearning for something new. Pérez remained with the band after Selena expressed that their relationship would be over, stressing her concerns over Pérez's past behaviors around women and alcohol.

In May 1993, Selena released her live recording that was also supported by its two US top-five singles, "No Debes Jugar" and "La Llamada". Selena's first performance at the Houston Astrodome in February 1993 attracted over 60,000 attendees, an unprecedented feat. Selena's biographer, Joe Nick Patoski, found Selena Live! to have functioned as a proclamation that signaled Selena's preeminence as the most popular Tejano musician. The singer began garnering consistent airplay in New York City and Miami, areas where Tejano music had not previously gained significant interest. By August 1993, Selena ranked as the fifth best-selling Latin artist in the United States, behind Luis Miguel and Gloria Estefan. EMI Latin first issued its Latin Classics catalog series for Paloma San Basilio on January 22, 1993, before issuing it for the label's other artists beginning in the week of September 17, 1993, under the titles Mis Mejores Canciones – 17 Super Éxitos. The company released an all-encompassing collection series showcasing their Latin music artists.

== Music ==
The compilation encompasses 17 tracks, ranging from compositions present on Selena (1989) to her Entre a Mi Mundo (1992) recording. It commences with "Como la Flor" (1992). The track became a commercially and critically acclaimed piece and is widely regarded as Selena's signature song. Billed as the singer's "trademark", "Como la Flor" has become a posthumous epithet and swan song, as well as her most renowned recording. The second track, "Mentiras" (1989), is taken from Selena's self-titled debut album with EMI Latin. The following track, "¿Qué Creías?" (1992), functions as a "kiss-off anthem", that Selena claimed represents women on a collective scale. Patoski characterized the track as "all sass and fire" and noted its deviation from Selena's customary cumbia style. The fourth song, "Besitos" (1989), the first instance in which Astudillo provided production and songwriting assistance, served as a defining moment for Selena y Los Dinos, as it marked their distinctive cumbia sound in subsequent releases. Following this is the ranchera "Yo Fui Aquella" (1990), while the emotive sixth track, "Después de Enero", is taken from Ven Conmigo (1990). The eighth song on the compilation, "Vuelve a Mí" (1992), characterized as a polka, expresses Selena's yearning for a former lover to return. In a recitative preamble accompanied by the auditory backdrop of a thunderstorm, Selena remarks that the precipitation evokes memories of the day her lover departed, drawing a parallel between the raindrops and her tears.

"No Quiero Saber" (1990) opens the ninth track and is taken from Ven Conmigo, and is followed by the re-recorded rendition of "Costumbres" (1990). These are followed by Selena's "Tengo Ganas de Llorar" (1989) and Ven Conmigo's "Baila Esta Cumbia" (1990). Selena's cover of Juan Gabriel's "Yo Me Voy" (1990) opens the twelfth track off Mis Mejores Canciones – 17 Super Éxitos. Following this is "La Carcacha" (1992), which originally appeared on Entre a Mi Mundo (1992). Tejano music often suffered from simplistic and generic lyrical content; however, Selena's brother A. B. Quintanilla and Astudillo overcame this stereotype by crafting songs that rendered vibrant depictions of life in the barrio. The following tracks, "Tú Eres" and the 1960s cover of Japanese singer Kyu Sakamoto's "Sukiyaki", are taken from Selena (1989). The penultimate piece, "Estoy Contigo", originally recorded in 1983 for Cara Records, was re-recorded for 16 Super Exitos Originales (1990). "La Tracalera" from Ven Conmigo (1990) serves as the concluding track for the compilation.

== Release and critical reception ==
Professional ratings
Review scores
Source	Rating
AllMusic	4.5/5 stars
The Encyclopedia of Popular Music	3/5 stars

Mis Mejores Canciones – 17 Super Éxitos was released around the time Q-Productions, a production company and recording studio operated by Selena's family, was being built. The recording studio acted as "a new home" for the group to record and practice in. The album preceded Selena's appearance on the Johnny Canales Show, which attracted a capacity crowd, and her August 29 appearance on Veronica Castro's Y Vero América ¡Va!, which was shown throughout Latin America through Televisa. Writing for Vogue México y Latinoamérica, Esteban Villaseñor felt that Selena displayed "charisma, genuineness and talent" during her appearance on Castro's show. On its first day of release, Selena performed at La Feria de Nuevo León, drawing 70,000 attendees. Noticing a string of compilation releases, Ramiro Burr, writing for the Houston Chronicle, referred to Selena's release as being part of a "compilation craze", that offered an enjoyable range of options for listening. Howard Blumenthal included Selena's Mis Mejores Canciones – 17 Super Éxitos in his listening guide on the best world music albums, describing it as a commendable assemblage that showcases the singer's early popular recordings.

On March 31, 1995, Selena was shot and killed, and media attention helped increase sales of her back catalog. Stores across the country reported emptied shelves of the singer's works as far away as Rhode Island. A music wholesaler in Manhattan, who constantly sold out of Selena's albums the same day they received them following her death, expressed to Newsday that "It used to be just the Mexicans [in Manhattan]. Now everybody likes her". As a result, EMI Latin increased the production of the singer's albums at their Los Angeles, and Greensboro, North Carolina plants. Mis Mejores Canciones – 17 Super Éxitos debuted at number one on the US Billboard Top Catalog Albums chart, the first Spanish-language recording to do so, on the week ending May 6, 1995. It held the distinction of being the only Spanish-language album to reach atop the chart until Buena Vista Social Club's self-titled album reached the top spot in November 1999. Mis Mejores Canciones – 17 Super Éxitos remained atop the chart for two consecutive weeks. In 1995, catalog titles made up nearly 50% of the music consumed in the United States. Selena's Ven Conmigo and Mis Mejores Canciones - 17 Super Éxitos contributed to the $5 billion (1995 USD) revenue reported that year by the music industry. The Recording Industry Association of America (RIAA) certified the album diamond (Latin), denoting 600,000 units shipped in the US.

== Track listing ==
Credits from the album's liner notes.

No.	Title	Writer(s)	Length
1.	"Como la Flor" (1992; from Entre a Mi Mundo sessions)	A. B. Quintanilla; Pete Astudillo	3:02
2.	"Mentiras" (1989; from Selena sessions)	A. B.; Astudillo	2:35
3.	"¿Qué Creías?" (1992; from Entre a Mi Mundo sessions)	A. B.; Ricky Vela (Note: Incorrect credits; originally written by A. B. Quintanilla and Pete Astudillo.)	3:30
4.	"Besitos" (1989; from Selena sessions)	A. B. (Note: Astudillo uncredited as co-writer.)	2:22
5.	"Yo Fui Aquella" (1990; from 16 Super Exitos Originales sessions)	A. B.	3:00
6.	"Después de Enero" (1990; from Ven Conmigo sessions)	Johnny Herrera	2:57
7.	"Vuelve a Mí" (1992; from Entre a Mi Mundo sessions)	A. B.; Astudillo	2:55
8.	"No Quiero Saber" (1990; from Ven Conmigo sessions)	A. B.; Astudillo	2:54
9.	"Costumbres" (1990; from 16 Super Exitos Originales sessions)	Juan Gabriel	3:46
10.	"Tengo Ganas de Llorar" (1989; from Selena sessions)	A. B.; Vela	3:16
11.	"Baila Esta Cumbia" (1990; from Ven Conmigo sessions)	A. B. (Note: Astudillo uncredited as co-writer.)	2:57
12.	"Yo Me Voy" (1990; from Ven Conmigo sessions)	Gabriel	3:28
13.	"La Carcacha" (1992; from Entre a Mi Mundo sessions)	A. B.; Astudillo	4:09
14.	"Tú Eres" (1989; from Selena sessions)	A. B.; Astudillo	2:52
15.	"Sukiyaki" (1989; from Selena sessions)	Rokusuke Ei; Hachidai Nakamura; Abraham Quintanilla (Note: Janice-Marie Johnson and Astudillo are uncredited as co-writers.)	3:01
16.	"Estoy Contigo" (1990; from 16 Super Exitos Originales sessions)	Abraham	3:15
17.	"La Tracalera" (1990; from Ven Conmigo sessions)	Herrera	2:50
Total length:			54:07

== Chart performance ==
Weekly chart performance for Mis Mejores Canciones – 17 Super Éxitos
Chart (1995)	Peak position
US Top Catalog Albums (Billboard)	1

== Certifications ==
Certification for Mis Mejores Canciones – 17 Super Éxitos
Region	Certification	Certified units/sales
United States (RIAA)	Diamond (Latin)	600,000^{‡}
^{‡} Sales+streaming figures based on certification alone.

== See also ==
- Latin American music in the United States
- Women in Latin music

== Works cited ==
- Quintanilla, Selena (2002). Entre a Mi Mundo (Media notes). A. B. Quintanilla (producer), Suzette Quintanilla (spoken liner notes producer). EMI Latin.
- Quintanilla, Selena (1989). Selena (Media notes). A. B. Quintanilla (producer), Suzette Quintanilla (spoken liner notes producer). EMI Latin. 724354099403.
- Soriano, Ashley (May 5, 2021). "Former Selena band member looks back on a legacy". KGNS.
- Oliva, John (August 25, 2022). "Selena: 11 deep cuts from the Queen of Tejano you should be listening to". Corpus Christi Caller-Times. ProQuest 2706102503.
- Saldana, Hector (October 27, 1995). "'Storm' in Liberty Band's musical forecast". San Antonio Express-News.
- Huston-Crespo, Marysabel E. (March 31, 2022). "¿Cuál es la magia de Selena Quintanilla? El legado de la cantante tejana sigue intacto a más de un cuarto de siglo de su muerte". CNN en Espanol (in Spanish). Gale A698927110 – via Gale Research.
- Blanco-Cano, Rosana; Urquijo-Ruiz, Rita E. (2011). Global Mexican cultural productions (1st ed.). Palgrave Macmillan. ISBN 978-0-230-37039-5.
- Parédez, Deborah (2009). Selenidad: Selena, Latinos, and the Performance of Memory. Duke University Press. ISBN 978-0-8223-9089-3.
- Ragland, Kathy (March 24, 1996). "With respect: Patoski's 'Selena: Como la Flor' is a perceptive and sympathetic view of the life and death of the Tejano star". Austin American-Statesman. Austin, Texas. p. G6 – via Newspapers.com.
- Garcia, Gus (July 26, 1993). "Selena, Sonny wow crowd". Del Rio News-Herald. p. 1 – via Newspapers.com.
- Burr, Ramiro; Shannon, Doug (2003). Encyclopedia Latina. Scholastic Library Publishing. ISBN 0717258157.
- Cabrera, Rene (May 29, 1998). "Double Bill on Saturday in Alice; Selena Still Atop Chart With Boxed Set". Corpus Christi Caller-Times. pp. E6, E7 – via Newspapers.com.
- "RIAA Certification - Mis Mejores Canciones (17 Super Exitos) - Selena". RIAA.com.
- "Top Catalog Albums > May 6, 1995". Billboard. Vol. 107, no. 18. May 6, 1995.
- "Top Catalog Albums > May 20, 1995" (PDF). Billboard. Vol. 107, no. 21. May 20, 1995.
- Lannert, John; Bronson, Fred; Mayfield, Geoff (April 15, 1995). "Selena's Tragedy Echoed in Charts". Billboard. Vol. 107, no. 15. pp. 72, 80, 82. ISSN 0006-2510.
- Mahoney-Jones, Keren (April 5, 1995). "Big with R.I.'s Spanish speakers". Providence Journal. ProQuest 397143755.
- Schone, Mark (April 20, 1995). "A Postmortem Star". Newsday. p. B3 – via Newspapers.com.
- Mejias-Rentas, Antonio (April 13, 1995). "Selena, numero uno". La Opinión. 69 (210).
- "Latin Classics". Billboard. Vol. 105, no. 24. June 12, 1993.
- Bogdanov, Vladimir (2001). All Music Guide: The Definitive Guide to Popular Music (4th ed.). Backbeat Books. ISBN 0-87930-627-0.
- Blumenthal, Howard J. (1998). The World Music CD Listener's Guide: The Best on CD. Billboard Books. ISBN 0823076636.
- Burr, Ramiro (January 22, 1993). "New Releases". El Paso Times. p. El Tiempo 8 – via Newspapers.com.
- Burr, Ramiro (September 17, 1993). "September Is Bountiful for fans of Latin Music". El Paso Times. p. El Tiempo 8 – via Newspapers.com.
- Burr, Ramiro (February 23, 1993). "Selena Poised for Pop Success". Austin American-Statesman. p. Onward to the Weekend 12 – via Newspapers.com.
- Burr, Ramiro (September 12, 1993). "Wealth of new releases covers classics to teen pop". Houston Chronicle. ProQuest 295914832.
- Burr, Ramiro (September 19, 1993). "New Latin releases offer choice listening pleasure". San Antonio Express-News. ProQuest 261492257.
- Maldonado, Vilma (August 13, 1993). "Selena's Brother Pens Lyrics, Backs up Tejano Star". The Monitor. pp. 22E, 23E – via Newspapers.com.
- Pérez, Chris (2012). To Selena, with Love. Penguin Books. ISBN 978-1-101-58026-4.
- Patoski, Joe Nick (1996). Selena: Como La Flor. Little Brown and Company. ISBN 0-316-69378-2.
- Quintanilla, Selena (1993). Mis Mejores Canciones - 17 Super Exitos (Media notes). A. B. Quintanilla (producer). EMI Latin. H2-527190.
- Swift, Richard (2006). The Encyclopedia of Popular Music (7th ed.). Oxford University Press. ISBN 9780195313734.
- Villaseñor, Esteban (May 4, 2021). "La historia de una memorable entrevista de Selena Quintanilla en México". Vogue México y Latinoamérica (in Spanish).
- Tirella, Joseph M. (August 1995). "Just the Facts". Vibe. 3 (6): 138.
- Mayfield, Geoff (November 13, 1999). "Most Valuable Players". Billboard. Vol. 111, no. 46. Gale A57634419 – via Gale Research.
