= List of awards and nominations received by Selena =

Selena awards and nominations
Awards and nominations
Award	Wins	Nominations
ASCAP Awards	1	1
BMI Awards	5	5
Billboard Latin Music Awards	14	19
Grammy Awards	3	4
Lo Nuestro Awards	9	12
Tejano Music Awards	44	48

Totals (Note: Certain award groups do not simply award one winner. They acknowledge several different recipients, have runners-up, and have third place. Since this is a specific recognition and is different from losing an award, runner-up mentions are considered wins in this award tally. For simplification and to avoid errors, each award in this list has been presumed to have had a prior nomination.)
- Wins: 70
- Nominations: 91

Selena was an American Tejano pop singer. She was nicknamed the "Queen of Tejano Music" by many media outlets including Entertainment Weekly, Billboard magazine, Los Angeles Magazine and Vibe. The singer had released eleven albums, six with her band Selena y Los Dinos and five without them: Mis Primeras Grabaciones (1984), Alpha (1986), Muñequito de Trapo (1987), And the Winner Is... (1987), Preciosa (1988), Dulce Amor (1988), Selena (1989), Ven Conmigo (1990), Entre a Mi Mundo (1992), Selena Live! (1993), Amor Prohibido (1994) and Dreaming of You (1995). They have sold more than 90 million copies worldwide. Her 10 award-winning songs include "Como La Flor", "Amor Prohibido", "Bidi Bidi Bom Bom", "Techno Cumbia", "Si Una Vez", "Tú Sólo Tú", "I Could Fall in Love", "Dreaming of You", "Siempre Hace Frio" and "No Quiero Saber".

Selena was nominated for 91 awards, with 69 wins. She won 3 Grammy Awards, 36 Tejano Music Awards, 14 Billboard Latin Music Awards, 10 Lo Nuestro Awards, five BMI Awards and one award from the American Society of Composers, Authors and Publishers. In 1995, she was inducted into the Billboard Latin Music Hall of Fame. The Spirit of Hope Award was created in Selena's honor in 1996, and was awarded to Latin artists who participated in humanitarian and civic causes. By 1998, Selena and Proyecto Uno were the first artists to have won a Billboard Latin Music Award in two different genres.

== Awards and nominations ==
=== ASCAP ===
The American Society of Composers, Authors and Publishers (ASCAP) honors its top members in a series of annual awards shows in seven different music categories: pop, rhythm and soul, film and television, Latin, country, Christian and concert music. Selena received one award from one nomination.

Year	Nominee / work	Award	Result
1995	"I Could Fall in Love"	Among Most Performed Song	Won

=== Bandamax Music Awards ===
The Bandamax Music Awards are a 24-hour cable television music channel owned by Televisa under Televisa Networks. It is available in Mexico, United States, and Latin America. This channel focuses on Mexican and Southern US group music: Banda, Duranguense, Norteña, and Mariachi. Selena has received 1 posthumous nomination.

Year	Nominee / work	Award	Result
2015	Selena	The Most Influential Artist on Social Media	Nominated

=== BMI Music Awards ===
Broadcast Music, Inc. (BMI) annually hosts award shows that honor the songwriters, composers and music publishers of the year's most-performed songs in the BMI catalog. Selena received all five awards that she was nominated for.

Year	Nominee / work	Award	Result
1995	"Amor Prohibido"	BMI Pop Music Award	Won
1995	"Bidi Bidi Bom Bom"	Most Performed Song of the Year	Won
1995	"No Me Queda Mas"	Song of the Year	Won
1995	"Dreaming of You"	Singles With Over a Million Airplay Impressions	Won
1996	"Si Una Vez"	Song of the Year	Won

=== Billboard Music Awards ===
The Billboard Music Awards is an annual music awards ceremony and one of several major annual American music awards shows. Selena has won one Billboard Music Awards for Latin Artist of the Year.

Year	Nominee / work	Award	Result
1995	Selena	Latin Artist of the Year	Won

=== Billboard Latin Music Awards ===
The Billboard Latin Music Awards is an annual awards show broadcast on the television network Telemundo, honoring Latin artists. Selena received 16 awards from 20 nominations.

Year	Nominee / work	Award	Result
1994	Selena	Regional Mexican Artist of the Year, Female	Won
1994	Selena Live!	Regional Mexican Album of the Year, Female	Won
1995	Selena	Hot Latin Tracks, Artist of the Year	Won
1995	Amor Prohibido	Regional Mexican Album of the Year, Female	Won
1995	"Amor Prohibido"	Regional Mexican Song of the Year	Won
1995	"No Me Queda Mas"	Music Video of the Year	Won
1995	Selena	Spirit of Hope Award	Won
1996	Selena	Hot Latin Tracks Artist of the Year	Won
1996	"Tú Sólo Tú"	Regional Mexican Hot Latin Track of The Year	Won
1996	"Tú Sólo Tú"	Regional Mexican Hot Latin Video of The Year	Won
1996	Dreaming of You	Pop Album of the Year, Female	Won
2001	All My Hits — Todos Mis Exitos Vol. 2	Latin Greatest-Hit Album of the Year	Won
2002	Live! The Last Concert	Pop album of the year, Female	Nominated
2011	Selena	Female Vocalist of the Year	Won
2011	Selena	Digital Download Artist of the Year	Won
2016	Selena	Top Latin Albums Artist of the Year, Female	Won
2016	Selena	Latin Pop Albums Artist of the Year, Solo	Nominated
2017	Selena	Top Latin Albums Artist of the Year, Female	Won
2017	Selena	Latin Pop Albums Artist of the Year, Solo	Nominated
2017	Lo Mejor de... Selena	Latin Pop Album of the Year	Nominated

=== Billboard Mexican Music Awards ===
The Billboard Mexican Music Awards are awarded annually by the Billboard magazine in the United States. Selena has received one nomination.

Year	Nominee / work	Award	Result
2013	Selena	Digital Download Artist of the Year	Nominated

=== Grammy Awards ===
The Grammy Awards are awarded annually by the National Academy of Recording Arts and Sciences of the United States. Selena received three awards from four nominations.

Year	Nominee / work	Award	Result
1994	Selena Live!	Best Mexican/American Album	Won
1995	Amor Prohibido	Best Mexican/American Album	Nominated
2021	Selena	Lifetime Achievement Award	Won
2026	Amor Prohibido	Grammy Hall of Fame	Won

=== Hollywood walk of fame ===
Year	Nominee / work	Award	Result
2017	Selena	Hollywood Walk of Fame	Won

=== Lo Nuestro Awards ===
The Lo Nuestro Awards is an awards show honoring the best of Latin music, presented by television network Univision. Selena received 9 awards from 12 nominations.

Year	Nominee / work	Award	Result
1992	Selena	Regional Mexican Female Artist	Nominated
1993	Selena	Regional Mexican Female Artist	Won
1993	Entre a Mi Mundo	Regional Mexican Album of the Year	Won
1993	"Como La Flor"	Regional Mexican Song of the Year	Won
1994	Selena	Regional Mexican Female Artist	Won
1994	Selena Live!	Regional Mexican Album of the Year	Nominated
1994	"No Debes Jugar"	Regional Mexican Song of the Year	Nominated
1995	Selena	Female Pop Artist of the Year	Won
1995	Selena	Regional Mexican Female Artist	Won
1995	Amor Prohibido	Regional Mexican Album of the Year	Won
1995	"Amor Prohibido"	Regional Mexican Song of the Year	Won
1996	Selena	Special Tribute Artist of the Year	Won

=== Tejano Music Awards ===
Nominated for 48, Selena won 44Tejano Music Awards, which are awarded annually in San Antonio, Texas, honoring Tejano acts.

Year	Nominee / work	Award	Result
1986	Selena	Female Vocalist of the Year	Won
1987	Selena	Female Vocalist of the Year	Won
1987	Selena	Most Promising Band of the Year	Won
1987	Alpha	Album of the Year – Orchestra	Won
1987	"Dame Un Beso"	Song of the Year	Won
1988	Selena	Female Entertainer of the Year	Won
1988	"Terco Corazon"	Song of the Year	Nominated
1988	And the Winner Is ...	Album of the Year – Orchestra	Nominated
1989	Selena	Female Entertainer of the Year	Won
1989	Selena	Female Vocalist of the Year	Won
1989	Dulce Amor	Album of the Year – Orchestra	Nominated
1990	Selena	Female Vocalist of the Year	Won
1990	Selena	Female Entertainer of the Year	Won
1990	Selena	Album of the Year – Orchestra	Won
1990	"Amame, Quiéreme"	Vocal Duo of the Year	Won
1991	Selena	Female Vocalist of the Year	Won
1991	Selena	Female Entertainer of the Year	Won
1991	Ven Conmigo	Album of the Year – Orchestra	Won
1992	Selena	Female Vocalist of the Year	Won
1992	Selena	Female Entertainer of the Year	Won
1992	"La Carcacha"	Song of the Year	Nominated
1993	Selena	Female Vocalist of the Year	Won
1993	Selena	Female Entertainer of the Year	Won
1993	Entre a Mi Mundo	Album of the Year – Orchestra	Won
1993	"Como La Flor"	Single of the Year	Won
1994	Selena	Female Vocalist of the Year	Won
1994	Selena	Female Entertainer of the Year	Won
1994	Selena Live!	Album of the Year – Orchestra	Won
1994	"No Debes Jugar"	Single of the Year	Won
1995	Selena	Female Vocalist of the Year	Won
1995	Selena	Female Entertainer of the Year	Won
1995	Amor Prohibido	Album of the Year – Orchestra	Won
1995	"Amor Prohibido"	Single of the Year	Won
1995	"Bidi Bidi Bom Bom"	Song of the Year	Won
1996	Selena	Female Vocalist of the Year	Won
1996	Selena	Female Entertainer of the Year	Won
1996	Selena y Los Dinos	Showband of the Year	Won
1996	Dreaming of You	Album of the Year – Overall	Won
1996	"Tú Sólo Tú"	Song of the Year	Won
1996	"I Could Fall in Love"	Tejano Crossover Song of the Year	Won
1997	Selena	Female Vocalist of the Year	Won
1997	Selena	Female Entertainer of the Year	Won
1997	"Siempre Hace Frio"	Song of the Year	Won
1997	"No Quiero Saber"	Tejano Crossover Song of the Year	Won
2001	Selena	Lifetime Achievement Award	Won
2010	Selena	Best Female Vocalist of the 1980s	Won
2010	Selena	Best Female Vocalist of the 1990s	Won
2010	"Bidi Bidi Bom Bom"	Best 1990s Song	Won
