= Missing My Baby =

1992 song performed by Selena

Song by Selena

from the album Entre a Mi Mundo and Dreaming of You
- Recorded: 1991 (original version); 1995 (remix version)
- Studio: Sun Valley, Los Angeles, California
- Genre: R&B
- Length: 3:48 (original version); 4:12 (remix version)
- Label: EMI Latin
- Songwriter: A.B. Quintanilla III
- Producers: A.B. Quintanilla III; Full Force (remix)

"Missing My Baby" is a song released by American singer Selena on her third studio album Entre a Mi Mundo (1992). It was composed by A.B. Quintanilla—her brother and principal record producer, whose intention was to showcase Selena's diverse musical abilities. Selena included it on the album to help her cross over into the English-speaking market. Critics praised her emotive enunciation in the song. After Selena was murdered in 1995, a remix version by R&B group Full Force appeared on her fifth studio album Dreaming of You, which was originally intended to be her full-length English-language debut album. A posthumous music video made for VH1 was released to promote the triple box-set Anthology (1998).

"Missing My Baby" is a mid-tempo R&B ballad influenced by urban and soul music. The lyrics describe the love felt by the narrator, who reminisces of rhapsodic events she has shared with her lover. In some parts of the song, the narrator experiences loneliness and anguish because of the absence of her boyfriend. Although never intended to be released as a single, the track peaked at number 22 on the US Rhythmic Top 40 chart in 1995 after Selena's death.

== Background and development ==
"Missing My Baby" was written by Selena's brother and the song's principal record producer A.B. Quintanilla III, who wrote it in a week, and three weeks later, in late 1991, it was recorded at Sun Valley, Los Angeles. It was created for Selena's 1992 album Entre a Mi Mundo, to showcase her diverse musical abilities and to add to the album's variety of musical styles, which include Mexican pop and traditional Mexican songs, whereas "Missing My Baby" is in the style of contemporary R&B.

After the release of Selena's full-length Spanish albums Selena (1989) and Ven Conmigo (1990), which included Tejano and other Mexican pop styles, she decided that her next recording would feature an English-language song. She believed that such a song would convince EMI Records' chairman Charles Koppelman that she was ready to release a crossover album. EMI had wanted her to acquire a larger fan base before launching her crossover career. In spite of this, Selena included the song on Entre a Mi Mundo.

In 1995, during the recording sessions for Dreaming of You, which was intended to be Selena's full-length English-language debut album, EMI Latin wanted R&B group Full Force to perform a remixed version of the song for the album after the group saw a video of Selena's live performance and expressed interest in working with her. EMI then flew Quintanilla III and Selena out to meet with the group at their Brooklyn recording studio. Full Force agreed to add backing vocals, which they recorded the majority of in two days to replace Selena's backing vocals. Selena also re-recorded her lead vocals on the final verse and choruses for a new key change on the remix version, which EMI approved for the album. Full Force were then asked to pause production on the remix version before Selena could add more backing vocals as she still had touring commitments to fulfil at the time. After Selena was murdered by Yolanda Saldívar on March 31, 1995, Full Force agreed to complete their production on the remix version, including singing the remaining backing vocal parts that had originally been intended for Selena to record. The group invited the Quintanilla family to hear the finished result in the studio, which left them in tears.

== Composition ==
"Missing My Baby (remix)" (1995)
"Missing My Baby" is an R&B song with influences of urban and soul music. Selena uses her emotive vocalization, which emphasis the song's title and its central theme. The lyrics convey the love felt by the narrator, who is distant from her boyfriend.

"Missing My Baby" is a mid-tempo R&B ballad with influences of urban and soul music. It is in the key of D major, at 144 beats per minute in common time. The recording incorporates melisma, with sung poetry during the downtempo part of the song. The melody is accompanied by backing vocals, and instrumentation is provided by an electric piano, drums, a keyboard, a synthesizer and strings. Contemporary music critics praised Selena's emotive enunciation, which emphasized the song's title and central theme. R&B group Full Force were the backing vocalists for the remix version of "Missing My Baby".

J.R. Reynolds, formerly of Billboard, called "Missing My Baby" a "dreamy ballad" with an "R&B-styled melody under Selena's pop vocals". Ramiro Burr of the Austin American-Statesman described it as a soul ballad. Jerry Johnston of the Deseret News thought that Selena displayed a "Leslie Gore [sic] baby-voice" in "Missing My Baby" and that she "displays a wonderful suppleness in her voice". The Virginian-Pilot said that the song was built on hooks that recall Diana Ross's "Missing You", which is a tribute to Marvin Gaye, and the Beach Boys' "Good to My Baby".

The song begins with a drum solo before the other instruments enter to form the musical foundation. Selena sings to her absent lover about how much she misses him, saying that he is "always on [her] mind" and that she feels lonely when he is not with her. Three times she sings, "I often think of the happy times we spent together/And I just can't wait to tell you that I love you". In the chorus, she sings of wanting to hold him tight and feel his heartbeat.

== Critical reception and legacy ==
"Missing My Baby" received positive reviews from critics. Vibe magazine reported that Full Force was awarded gold and platinum discs for "Missing My Baby" and "Techno Cumbia", and described "Missing My Baby" as giving a "hint of her aspirations". After the remix version appeared on the 1995 album Dreaming of You, the Hi XD said that it was the best English-language song on the album. Chris Riemenschneider and John T. Davis of the Austin American-Statesman wrote that "Missing My Baby can sound as fluffy as the Big M's "Crazy for You". Cary Clack of the San Antonio Express-News wrote that "Missing My Baby" was played on non-Tejano radio stations and that he thought it might become a posthumous hit, while commenting that the recording "displays [Selena's] wonderful vocal and emotional range". However, Mario Tarradell of The Dallas Morning News believed that "Missing My Baby" and other tracks were added to Entre a Mi Mundo "for good measure".

"Missing My Baby" was one of the first Selena songs to be played on radio stations after she was murdered by Yolanda Saldívar, her friend and former manager of her Selena Etc. boutiques. A music video of the song, incorporating footage from Selena's personal home videos, was released for VH1 in 1998 to promote the triple box-set Anthology. Billboard reported that the video was the 47th most played music video for that channel in the week ending 5 April 1998.

== Chart performance ==
Chart (1995)	Peak position
U.S. Billboard Rhythmic Top 40	22

== Personnel ==
Credits from the album's liner notes:

- Selena – lead vocals, backing vocals
- Full Force – remix and additional production, backing vocals
- Ricky Vela – keyboards
- Suzette Quintanilla – drums
- A.B. Quinatnilla – writing, production
