= 1995 Corpus Christi shooting =

Mass shooting in Texas, U.S.

- Location: 27.827022°N 97.547919°W; 2535 Rand Morgan Road, Corpus Christi, Texas, U.S.
- Date: April 3, 1995; 31 years ago
- Target: Walter Rossler Co.
- Attack type: Mass shooting, murder-suicide, mass murder
- Weapons: 9mm Ruger semi-automatic pistol; .32-caliber revolver
- Deaths: 6 (including the perpetrator)
- Perpetrator: James Daniel Simpson
- Motive: Unknown

On April 3, 1995, a mass shooting occurred at the Walter Rossler Co., a refinery inspection company in Corpus Christi, Texas, United States. The perpetrator, 28-year-old former employee James Simpson (who had quit a year prior), armed with a 9mm semi-automatic handgun & a .32-caliber revolver, killed five people before dying by suicide.

As of 2026, it remains the worst mass shooting in the history of Corpus Christi.

Walter Rossler Company sign

== Shooting ==
At approximately 4:15 - 4:30 p.m. CST on April 3, 1995, 28-year-old James Daniel Simpson walked through the front doors of Walter Rossler Co. armed with two handguns (a 9mm Ruger semi-automatic pistol and a .32-caliber revolver). There were ten people present in the building, of which five managed to escape unharmed (two escaped by crawling out the back door of the building).

Lisa Rossler-Duff, who was typing in one of the offices, reported seeing Simpson first go to Wendy Gilmore's office; once there, she heard James say "This is for you!" and then while standing in the doorway fired two or three shots, killing her. Shortly after shooting Gilmore, Simpson then walked across the small hallway and began shooting at both the owner Walter Rossler as well as his wife Joann Rossler along with employees Derek Harrison and Richard Tomlinson. He shoots her in the back of the head as she tried to flee away from him, along with employees Derek Harrison and Richard Tomlinson.

Simpson walk into the office next over and shoots a bullet through the room divider. The person in the room Richard Tomlinson, sprints from the other room and gets shot three times by James Simpson. James drops the magazine and reloads his pistol and shoots Derek Harrison. who was underneath his desk trying to hide. Ramiro Martinez Jr and Terry Carroll were hiding in a bathroom when the shooting happened and were able to escape through the back doors.

After seeing her father Walter fall to the floor, Lisa took cover under a table with her eight-month-old son and called 911. While she was on the phone, Simpson entered her office; Lisa, who thought she had locked the door, yelled "no!" as her son cried, and Simpson left the office without harming them.

Shortly after leaving Lisa's office, Simpson left the building through the back door and shot himself in the head. Lieutenant Wramp and Sgt Rivera kicked open the door to the storage area of the refinery and found James Simpson with a 9mm pistol sitting in his right hand. He was pronounced dead at the hospital about an hour later, along with one of the victims. The bodies of the other four remained at the crime scene for several hours. Afterwards, dozens of onlookers began to gather in front of the building, including several relatives of the victims, some of whom needed to lie on stretchers due to shock.

== Victims ==
- Walter Rossler, 62 (owner)
- Joann Rossler, 62 (owner's wife)
- Derek Harrison, 35
- Patty June "Wendy" Brunson Gilmore, 41
- Richard Lee Tomlinson, 34

== Perpetrator ==
James Daniel Simpson (February 16, 1967 − April 3, 1995) was born in Colorado Springs, Colorado. Not much is known about his early life, but he was living in Corpus Christi at the time of the shooting. Simpson's friends all knew him as a "silent person and a loner".

Approximately seven months before the shooting, in September 1994, Simpson abruptly left his job as a metalworker at Walter Rossler Co. after working at the company for about a year; this was probably due to him suffering from paranoia and depression at the time, although police claim there were no details as to why he left. After Simpson had quit his job, Walter Rossler had Harrison and Tomlinson go to Simpson's house to convince Simpson to go back to working for Walter Rossler co. Simpson was angry at the company for being assigned an assignment he did not want; according to Rhonda Rossler-Fowler, Walter and Joann's daughter, Simpson wanted to work exclusively in metallurgy and was reluctant to take on new assignments, including inspection duties. The company also subsequently attempted to get James to repay money he had been loaned for educational purposes. After the shooting, police went to Simpson's apartment and found three boxes of 9mm ammunition and .32 caliber bullets. These bullets matched the two guns that he used during the shooting. Police also noted that before the shooting, Simpson stopped by a park near the Walter Rossler refinery and fired off a couple of rounds into the sky.

== Aftermath ==
News of the workplace shooting received very little media coverage and was virtually overshadowed by the murder, three days earlier, of singer Selena Quintanilla-Pérez, whose funeral was held on the same day as of the shooting.

The motive is still officially unknown.

The refinery inspection company went out of business after the shooting and became a Petro Chem Inspection Services Inc., but nowadays, it has been permanently closed.Google Maps

The perpetrators' father and mother, Daniel and Nora Simpson, declined to give any comment to news sources after the shooting.

Legal scholars note that mass shootings and workplace gun violence continue to stay prevalent due to constitutional rulings on gun restrictions and gun laws especially concerning their implementation in the US. An example of this would be the 2022 Bruen decision. This decision in particular has restricted courts from using modern public health data when evaluating firearm regulations. In 1995 at the time there were on average 15,000 yearly deaths from gun violence in the US, meanwhile due to this lack of restrictions in 2024 this statistic has increased to 44,000 yearly deaths from firearms.

== See also ==
- Gun violence in the United States
- List of shootings in Texas
- List of massacres in the United States
- List of mass shootings in the United States
