= John T. Davis =

Writer and music journalist

- Born: Austin, Texas
- Occupation: Music critic; essayist; journalist
- Period: 1968–present

John T. Davis is an American music journalist and author based in Austin, Texas. He is the author of Austin City Limits: 25 Years of American Music.

== History ==
Currently based in Austin, Texas, John T. Davis' family roots are in New Mexico. In The Best of No Depression, John T. Davis was described as a "journalist, author and music historian." As a journalist, Davis' work has been published in Billboard, Newsday New Mexico Magazine, the Austin Chronicle, the Austin American-Statesman, Texas Monthly, and Texas Highways. In 2014, Davis published The Flatlanders: Now It's Now Again, a biography of the country band from Lubbock, Texas. The University of Texas Press wrote that Davis "traces the band’s musical journey from the house on 14th Street in Lubbock to their 2013 sold-out concert at Carnegie Hall. He explores why music was, and is, so important in Lubbock." John T. Davis has co-authored five mystery novels with Brent Douglass and James R. Dennis under the nom de plum Miles Arceneaux.

The Dolph Briscoe Center for American History at the University of Texas at Austin holds an archive of Davis' papers, interviews, and recordings.

== Bibliography ==
=== Non-fiction ===
- The Flatlanders – Now It’s Now Again, University of Texas Press – 2014
- Austin City Limits: 25 Years of American Music, Billboard Press – 2000
- Austin: Lone Star Rising, Towery Publishing – 1994

=== Fiction ===
As co-author

- Hidden Sea, Miles Arceneaux – 2016
- North Beach, Miles Arceneaux – 2015
- Ransom Island, Stephen F. Austin University Press – 2014
- La Salle’s Ghost, Stephen F. Austin University Press – 2013
- Thin Slice of Life, Stephen F. Austin University Press – 2012
