= Érika Alcocer Luna =

Mexican singer

Erika Alcocer Luna (born on July 19, 1974, in Tampico, Tamaulipas, Mexico) she is a Mexican singer. She is the winner of the Second Edition of the reality show La Academia, produced by TV Azteca. She also participated in the Mexican edition of La Voz. After that, she has continued an independent career participating in projects such as Las Reinas, musical theater and recording pop music.

She is known for her powerful voice in the style of power ballad and R&B tunes in Spanish. Her debut album "Devuelveme la Vida" by Warner Music Mexico hit the charts and quickly became gold disc for over 75,000 copies sold. Before participating in the academy, he auditioned for Operación Triunfo.

== Career ==
=== Singles ===
Song	Album
Devuélveme la Vida	Devuélveme la Vida
El Alma en Pie duet with Yahir	Devuélveme la Vida
Quiéreme Otra Vez	Devuélveme la Vida
