= Murder of Selena =

1995 murder in Corpus Christi, Texas, US

Murder of Selena Quintanilla-Pérez
- Graffiti left by fans at the motel room door where Saldívar met with Selena before shooting her
- Location: 27°48′05.6″N 97°27′15.2″W; Days Inn, Corpus Christi, Texas, U.S.
- Date: March 31, 1995; 31 years ago 11:48 a.m. (UTC−06:00)
- Attack type: Murder by shooting
- Weapon: Taurus Model 85 .38 Special revolver
- Victim: Selena Quintanilla-Pérez
- Perpetrator: Yolanda Saldívar
- Motive: Money embezzlement and Selena's management demanding fan club's missing financial records
- Verdict: Guilty
- Convictions: Murder with a deadly weapon
- Sentence: Life imprisonment with possibility of parole after 30 years (denied on March 27, 2025)

On the morning of March 31, 1995, American singer Selena Quintanilla-Pérez was fatally shot at the Days Inn in Corpus Christi, Texas. The shooter, Yolanda Saldívar, an American nurse and the president of Selena's fan club, had embezzled thousands of dollars from the singer's earnings.

Saldívar planned the murder over three weeks. Earlier in the day, Selena confronted Saldívar in her hotel room about recovering her financial records. Later that morning, Saldívar fired a hollow-point bullet from a .38 Special revolver, hitting Selena in the shoulder. Selena was rushed to Corpus Christi Memorial Hospital, where she was pronounced dead at 1:05 p.m. Following the shooting, Saldívar surrendered to the police after a more than nine-hour standoff.

The murder triggered a global outpouring of grief, with crowds gathering at Corpus Christi Memorial Hospital and outside the Days Inn, and tributes held worldwide. Three days following the murder, Selena was buried at Seaside Memorial Park. On April 12, then-Texas governor and future President George W. Bush declared her birthday Selena Day in Texas. At Saldívar's trial, she was convicted of murdering the singer and given a sentence of 30 years to life imprisonment. She has been denied parole since becoming eligible in 2025.

== Background ==
=== The Selena fan club ===
Selena Quintanilla-Pérez was born on April 16, 1971, at Freeport Community Hospital in Freeport, Texas, to Abraham Quintanilla Jr., a former musician, and Marcella Ofelia Quintanilla (née Samora). Selena was introduced to the music industry by her father, who saw "a way back into the music business" after discovering Selena's "perfect timing and pitch". Abraham quickly organized his children into a band called Selena y Los Dinos, which included A.B. Quintanilla III on bass, Suzette Quintanilla on drums and Selena as the lead singer. The band became the family's main source of income after they were evicted from their home during the Texas oil bust of 1982. They filed for bankruptcy after Abraham's Mexican restaurant suffered as a result of the oil bust.

The Quintanilla family moved to Corpus Christi, Texas, and Selena y Los Dinos began recording music professionally. In 1984 the band released its first LP record, Selena y Los Dinos, with a small, independent record company. Abraham wanted his children to record Tejano music—a male-dominated music genre popularized by Mexican-Americans in the United States. Selena's popularity as a singer grew after she won the Tejano Music Award for Female Vocalist of the Year in 1987. She landed her first major record deal with Capitol EMI Latin in 1989.

Yolanda Saldívar, a woman from San Antonio, Texas, became a fan of Tejano music in the mid-1980s. Saldívar had originally disliked Selena because she had won awards for which Saldívar's favorite Tejano musicians were nominated. In mid-1991, Saldívar and her niece attended one of Selena's concerts in San Antonio. She subsequently became an ardent Selena fan; she enjoyed the singer's stage presence and especially liked the song "Baila Esta Cumbia". The day after the concert, Saldívar unsuccessfully searched news stands for a souvenir of the event. She got the idea of organizing a local Selena fan club to promote the singer. According to Abraham, Saldívar tried contacting him and left him fifteen messages; she said she left only three. Abraham contacted her to discuss her idea of starting a fan club. After meeting Saldívar in person, he approved of her idea and gave her permission to proceed.

Saldívar became the founder and acting president of the Selena fan club in San Antonio in June 1991. She was licensed as a Texas registered nurse the same year. As fan club president, she was responsible for membership benefits and collecting $22 in exchange for products promoting Selena, a T-shirt bearing the singer's name, exclusive interviews with Selena y Los Dinos, a fact sheet about the band and notifications of upcoming concerts. Proceeds from the fan club were donated to charities. Selena's sister Suzette was the contact person between Saldívar and the Quintanilla family; Saldívar did not meet Selena herself until December 1991. The two became close friends and the Quintanilla family trusted her.

By 1994, Saldívar had signed up more than 8,000 fans. According to television news reporter and anchorwoman María Celeste Arrarás, she had become the "most efficient assistant" Selena ever had. Arrarás wrote that people noticed how eager Saldívar was to impress Selena and did anything the singer told her to do. One person told Arrarás, "If Selena would say [sic], 'Jump!', [Saldívar] would jump three times". Saldívar gave up her career as an in-home nurse to fully invest her time in running the Selena fan club, although she was earning less than she had in her previous career.

=== Selena Etc. boutiques ===
In 1994, Selena opened two boutiques called Selena Etc. in Corpus Christi and San Antonio, both equipped with in-house beauty salons. Her father thought Saldívar was a potential candidate to run the businesses because the family would be touring the country, based on her success in running the fan club. The rest of the family agreed; in January 1994, Saldívar became the manager of the boutiques. In September 1994, Selena signed Saldívar as her registered agent in San Antonio. After being hired to run the boutiques, Saldívar moved from South San Antonio to Corpus Christi to be closer to Selena. In an interview with Primer Impacto in 1995, Abraham said he personally "always mistrusted Saldívar", though the family never found anything odd about her behavior. Saldívar was authorized to write and cash checks, and had access to bank accounts associated with the fan club and boutiques.

Staff at Selena Etc. complained that Saldívar was always "nice" when Selena was around, but treated everyone terribly when the singer was away. By December 1994, the boutiques' bank accounts lacked sufficient funds to pay bills. Staff levels at both stores had been reduced from 38 to 14 employees, mainly because Saldívar fired those she disliked. The remaining employees complained to Selena, but the singer did not believe her friend would hurt her or her business. Employees reportedly told Selena that Saldívar was "two-faced" and "unstable". The employees then began to take their concerns to Selena's father, who warned her that Saldívar might be dangerous. Selena did not believe Saldívar would turn on her; her father had a habit of distrusting people.

In January 1995, Selena's cousin, Debra Ramirez, was hired to work in the boutiques and to help Selena expand the business into Mexico. She quit within a week, telling Saldívar she was dissatisfied with the failure of staff members to report sales. Ramirez also found receipts were missing from the sale of several boutique items. Saldívar told her to "mind [her] business" and that it was not her concern.

Saldívar also clashed with Martin Gomez, Selena's fashion designer, who complained that Saldívar was mismanaging the singer's affairs. Their animosity intensified during Selena's fashion shows, with Gomez accusing Saldívar of mutilating or destroying some of his original creations and never paying bills. The two constantly complained about each other to Selena. Saldívar began recording their conversations without Gomez's consent to persuade Selena he was not working for the boutiques' best interests. Gomez was relegated to a supporting role when Selena decided to design her clothes herself.

Between late 1994 and early 1995, Saldívar often traveled to Monterrey, to expedite the process of opening another Selena Etc. store in Mexico. When Saldívar visited the factory there, she intimidated the seamstresses by telling them to either side with her or leave.

=== Selena and Saldívar's relationship ===
Saldívar received "tokens of affection from [Selena]", which she was not accustomed to. Her room was covered with Selena posters and pictures, burning votive candles and a library of Selena videotapes which she played to entertain guests. During an interview with Saldívar in 1995, reporters from The Dallas Morning News said her devotion to Selena bordered on obsession. Saldívar told employees at Selena Etc. she wanted to "be like Selena". According to an unnamed former employee, she was "possessive" of her relationship with Selena, and tried to exert control by distancing the singer from the other employees. Saldívar said her reason for doing so was to "shield" the singer from the "petty issues" of managing her boutiques. Along with the responsibility of running the boutiques, Saldívar accompanied Selena on trips and had keys to the singer's house.

When Saldívar became a business associate, her relationship with Selena began to deteriorate. In September 1994, Selena met Ricardo Martinez, a doctor who lived in Monterrey, to inquire about opening a Selena Etc. location there. Martinez said he had contacts in Mexico who could help her grow her business. Martinez became a business adviser to Selena, though her family said he was simply a fan who posed in several pictures with her. (Note: Abraham Quintanilla, Jr. denied that Martinez had any type of a relationship with Selena. After hearing that Arrarás was going to publish a book that alluded to a possible relationship between Martinez and Selena, he said Martinez had pictures of Selena with him (Martinez) in them, posing as a fan. The Quintanilla family has disapproved of Arrarás' book since its inception in 1996.)

Saldívar became jealous of Selena's dependency on Martinez, who began sending flowers to Selena's hotel room. She warned the singer that Martinez might have unprofessional intentions. Selena began visiting Monterrey more frequently, often in disguise. Sebastian D'Silva, Martinez's assistant, would pick up Selena at the airport; he said he noticed she was wearing wigs and using her husband Chris Pérez's surname so others would not identify her. According to Martinez, he had lent several thousand dollars to Selena because she was short on cash.

=== Saldívar's termination of employment ===
Starting in January 1995, Abraham began receiving telephone calls and letters from angry fans who stated they paid their enrollment fees for the fan club, but had not received the promised memorabilia. Meanwhile, at both of Selena's boutiques in Corpus Christi and San Antonio, employees noted an influx of unpaid or overdue bills arriving in the mail, for which Saldívar could provide no plausible explanation. Upon investigation, Abraham discovered Saldívar had embezzled more than $60,000 (equivalent to $126,774 in 2025) using forged checks from both the fan club and the boutiques.

Saldívar's brother, Armando, supposedly contacted Gomez and "made up a story" that she was stealing money from the fan club. Gomez then contacted one of Selena's uncles by telephone; the uncle then told Abraham. Armando said he was angry with Saldívar but did not want the reason why to be made public; later he said he felt guilty for starting the rumor. He appeared on the Spanish-language television news program Primer Impacto, but reporters found his comments illogical.

On March 9, 1995, Abraham held a meeting with Selena and Suzette at Q-Productions to confront Saldívar about the embezzlement. Abraham presented Saldívar with evidence concerning the missing funds, in response to which she simply stared at him without denying the accusations or answering questions. He later recalled that Saldívar was "emotional at times" and "just cool as ice" at other times. When he asked why fans were not receiving their promised gift packages, Saldívar said those fans were trying to get the items for free. Abraham had also discovered that Saldívar had opened the fan club's bank account under the name of her sister, "Maria Elida". When asked why she had done this, Saldívar replied that the bank would not allow her to open an account in her name; she did not know the reason for this refusal.

Saldívar abruptly left the meeting; Abraham banned her from contacting Selena as a result. However, Selena did not want to end their friendship; she felt Saldívar was essential to the success of her clothing line in Mexico, and felt she needed Saldívar's bank records, statements and financial records for tax purposes. Saldívar's name remained on the payroll after the meeting, though her termination was pending on the retrieval of the financial records that were stolen. Despite her initial reluctance, Selena told Suzette on March 25 that she was planning on terminating Saldívar's employment "soon".

After the meeting, Abraham discovered the fan club's checks were signed with Maria Elida's signature in handwriting identical to Saldívar's. He concluded that Saldívar was writing forged checks using her sister's name, then cashing them and keeping the funds. When he tried to retrieve the fan club's bank statements, he said they had "vanished". He found a letter in Saldívar's handwriting stating that Maria Elida had to close the bank account because of a major problem. According to the letter, a member of the fan club, "Yvonne Perales", was sent to the bank to deposit $3,000, but Perales did not deposit the money and could not be found. The letter stated that Maria Elida found out about the situation "too late" and that Perales and the money were missing.

Maria Elida then wrote checks to be cashed by Saldívar, even though the bank account had no funds. The letter said Maria Elida was closing the account for that reason and that the bank would have to cover the checks. Abraham confronted Saldívar about Perales' identity; he said Saldívar knew nothing about her. Abraham said Saldívar did not trust the treasurer of the fan club, but she had trusted a complete stranger to deposit $3,000. He told Saldívar to "tell that lie to someone else". He concluded that Perales did not exist, since none of the fan club workers had ever met her.

=== Failed attempts to kill Selena ===
The day after Saldívar was banned from contacting Selena, Abraham drove to Q-Productions and chased her off the premises. That same day, Selena and Saldívar argued by telephone. The singer and her husband were unsatisfied with Saldívar's explanation for why the items were unaccounted for.

According to Abraham, there were four attempts to murder Selena. On March 10, 1995, Selena removed Saldívar's name from the boutique's bank account and replaced Saldívar as president of the fan club. The next day, Saldívar purchased a five-shot Taurus Model 85 revolver chambered in .38 Special at A Place to Shoot, a gun shop and shooting range in San Antonio. She also bought five hollow-point bullets, which are a type of expanding bullet which cause a more lethal impact and more extensive injuries than typical bullets. Saldívar told the clerk she needed protection in her job as an in-home nurse because a patient's relatives had threatened her.

On March 13, Saldívar went to her lawyer and wrote her resignation, which Abraham believed was her alibi. That same day, while Selena was visiting Miami, Saldívar drove to Corpus Christi and checked into the Sand and Sea Motel. Abraham believed this would have been the first attempt to kill Selena. When Selena arrived in Corpus Christi on March 14, Saldívar contacted her to schedule a meeting. Saldívar told Selena there was too much traffic and asked her to meet her at a parking lot 25 miles (40 km) away from Corpus Christi. Upon arriving, Selena told Saldívar she could remain in charge of her business affairs in Mexico.

According to Abraham, Selena wanted to continue employing Saldívar until she could find a replacement. Saldívar showed Selena the revolver she had bought. Selena told her to "get rid of it" and said she would protect Saldívar from Abraham, according to Saldívar and Pérez. This, Abraham believed, calmed Saldívar and dissuaded her from killing Selena in the parking lot. The next day, Saldívar returned the revolver to the shop saying her father had given her a .22 caliber pistol.

Saldívar accompanied Selena on a trip to Tennessee while the singer finished recording a song for her crossover album. The singer told Saldívar some bank statements were missing and asked her to return them as soon as they returned to Texas. Saldívar re-purchased the revolver on March 27 and asked Selena to meet her alone at a motel room. However, news of Selena's arrival spread and she was soon mobbed by fans. Abraham believed Selena's fans saved her that day from a second murder attempt, as there were "too many witnesses".

According to Abraham, the third murder attempt occurred during Saldívar's trip to Monterrey in the last week of March. Martinez received telephone calls from Saldívar crying hysterically and saying she had been raped on March 29. Saldívar made another call to Martinez the following day, with Martinez recalling later that it sounded as though someone was trying to snatch away the telephone on her end. He sent an employee to Saldívar's motel room to investigate. The employee found she had left a few minutes earlier.

On March 30, Saldívar returned from Monterrey and checked into a Days Inn motel in Corpus Christi. She contacted Selena and told her she had been raped. According to Abraham this was the last message, which he believed was her new alibi, that the family received from Saldívar. Saldívar asked Selena to visit her at her motel room alone, but her husband Pérez accompanied her. According to Pérez, he waited by his truck as Selena went alone into Saldívar's motel room.

As Pérez drove back to their house, Selena noticed Saldívar had failed to give her the correct bank statements she needed. Saldívar tried contacting Selena through her pager; she desperately wanted Selena to take her to a hospital, stating she was bleeding due to her rape. Abraham believed Saldívar was trying to get Selena to return to the motel alone. Pérez told Selena it was "too late" and did not want her to go out alone. Unbeknownst to Pérez, Selena agreed to meet Saldívar the next morning.

== Murder ==
On March 30, 1995, Selena contacted Leonard Wong about the perfume samples he had made for her. According to Wong, the singer told him she would be meeting Saldívar the next morning to pick up the samples that had been stolen from her. That same day, Selena told an employee at the boutique she was expecting to fire Saldívar. The employee followed Selena to her home that night because she was concerned over the singer after their discussion about Saldívar. At 7:30 a.m. on March 31, Selena traveled to Saldívar's motel room. (Note: Pérez stated in his To Selena, With Love book that Selena drove to her meeting with Saldívar in his truck because her own car was out of fuel. Selena occasionally tended to drive until her car ran out of fuel.)

At the motel, Saldívar told Selena she had been raped in Mexico. Selena took her to Doctors Regional Hospital, (Note: At the Saldívar trial, nurse Carla Anthony testified that Selena and Saldivar's visit to the hospital occurred seven days before Selena's murder, on March 24, 1995.) where medical staff noticed Saldívar showed "clear symptoms of depression". Saldívar told medical staff she had bled "a little", to which Selena angrily responded that Saldívar had told her the opposite, that she was bleeding profusely the day before. Nurse Carla Anthony informed Saldívar she needed to travel to San Antonio to obtain a gynecological examination because she "was a resident of San Antonio, the hospital was in Corpus, and the rape occurred outside the country".

While driving back to the motel, Selena told Saldívar it would be best if they stayed apart for a while to avoid upsetting Abraham. According to Martinez, the singer had tried to contact him that morning but he was unavailable due to performing surgery. At 10:00 a.m., Abraham contacted Pérez to determine Selena's whereabouts; she was due to record a song at Q-Productions that morning and had not arrived. Pérez called Selena on her cellular phone (Note: According to Pérez in his book, To Selena, With Love, when he was going to call Selena about her absence from a scheduled recording session at Q-Productions, he discovered that his cell phone was gone and realized that Selena took it to her meeting with Saldívar. Pérez inferred from this that Selena's own cell phone was dead. This is why Pérez tried to reach Selena by making a call from the house phone to his cell phone.) and reminded her of the scheduled recording. She told him she had forgotten the session and she was "taking care of one last [item of] business" and would be at Q-Productions soon after. This was the last telephone call Selena answered and the last time Pérez heard her voice.

At the motel room, Selena and Saldívar began arguing, which other motel guests overheard. Selena told Saldívar she could no longer be trusted, and demanded the return of her financial papers. During the discussion, Selena removed, and carried in her hand, an egg ring given to her by Saldívar. At some point, Selena began to leave the motel room with her purse, cellphone, and satchel on her person. At 11:48 a.m., Saldívar aimed her revolver at Selena as she attempted to leave the room and fired a bullet, hitting her lower right shoulder and causing her to bleed profusely. Trinidad Espinoza, the motel's maintenance man, reported hearing a "loud bang", which he likened to a car backfiring.

Selena, bleeding profusely from her external wound, ran towards the lobby, leaving a trail of blood 392 feet (119 m) long. Selena’s belongings were discovered scattered around the parking lot and grassy area outside Room 158. She was seen clutching her chest screaming, "Help me! Help me! I've been shot!". Saldívar chased after her, raising the revolver and calling her a "bitch". According to motel staff, Saldívar seemed "calm" and went back in her room after chasing Selena. Motel staff noticed the singer's clothes were "soaked in blood" when she approached the lobby.

Selena fell to the floor at 11:49 a.m. as hotel general manager Barbara Schultz summoned emergency services. The singer told the staff, "Lock the door! She'll shoot me again!" She identified Saldívar as her assailant and gave the number of the room where she had been shot. Selena was "mortally wounded [and] terrified" when she identified Saldívar, having said her last words "Yolanda... (room) 158." Her condition began to deteriorate rapidly as motel staff attended to her. Motel sales manager Ruben DeLeon tried talking to Selena but discovered she was beginning to lose consciousness; he said she was moaning and moving less often. He noticed Selena's eyes had rolled back and that she went limp.

An ambulance arrived at the scene in one minute and 55 seconds. Paramedics tore away the blood-stained green sweater and applied a Vaseline gauze to Selena's wound, which stopped the surface bleeding. Her heartbeat was very slow. One paramedic performed cardiopulmonary resuscitation to keep her blood circulating. Paramedic Richard Fredrickson said "it was too late" when he arrived in the lobby. He found a "thick [pool of blood] from her neck to her knees, all the way around on both sides [of her body]". Fredrickson could not detect a pulse. When he placed his fingers on her neck, he felt only muscle twitches.

A paramedic tried inserting an intravenous needle into Selena, but her veins had collapsed because of the massive blood loss and low (or no) blood pressure, making the insertion extremely difficult. Local police closed off Navigation Boulevard. When paramedics delivered Selena to Corpus Christi Memorial Hospital at 12:00 p.m., her pupils were fixed and dilated, there was no evidence of neurological function, she had no vital signs, and was declared clinically brain dead. Doctors were able to establish an "erratic heartbeat" long enough to transfer her to the trauma room. Doctors began blood transfusions in an attempt to re-establish blood circulation after opening Selena's chest and finding massive internal bleeding.

Selena's right lung was damaged, her collarbone was shattered and her veins were emptied of blood. Doctors widened her chest opening, administered drugs into her heart and applied pressure to her wounds. Cardiac surgeon Louis Elkins arrived at Memorial Hospital and said he saw doctors making "heroic efforts" to revive Selena. He described the singer as being "extremely contused and shredded. The right side of her chest, all the tissue was ripped." By the time Elkins arrived, an emergency doctor began "massaging her heart" after it had stopped beating. Elkins reported how all efforts were futile and said had he been the receiving doctor, he would not have made any treatments on Selena. He felt "obligated to continue" after the emergency room doctor decided to reanimate the singer.

Elkins said a "pencil-size artery leading from the heart had been cut in two by the hollow-point bullet" and that six units of blood from the transfusion had spilled out from her circulatory system. A breathing tube was administered after Selena stopped breathing on her own, while a clamp was placed on her "gushing" pierced artery on her collarbone. After 50 minutes, the doctors realized the damage was irreparable. Selena was pronounced dead at 1:05 p.m. at age 23, from blood loss and cardiac arrest.

During the third hour after the shooting, an autopsy was performed due to overwhelming media interest. It revealed that the bullet had entered Selena's upper right back, near her shoulder blade, passed through her chest cavity, severed the right subclavian artery, and exited her right upper chest. It took minutes from the point of impact of the bullet that Selena lost "virtually all the blood in her body" which contributed to her rapidly bleeding to death. Doctors said that if the bullet had been only one millimeter higher or lower, the wound would have been less severe.

=== Standoff ===
After the shooting, Saldívar entered her pickup truck and tried to leave the motel parking lot. Motel employee Rosario Garza saw her leave her room with a wrapped towel. It was later thought she was going to Q-Productions to shoot Abraham and others who were waiting for Selena. However, she was spotted by a responding police officer in a patrol car. The officer left his vehicle, drew his gun and ordered Saldívar to exit the truck. Saldívar did not comply; she backed up and parked adjacent to two cars. Her truck was then blocked in by the patrol car. Saldívar picked up the pistol, pointed it at her right temple and threatened to commit suicide. A SWAT team and the FBI Crisis Negotiation Unit were brought in. Musicologist Himilce Novas later said the event was reminiscent of O. J. Simpson's planned suicide ten months earlier.

Larry Young and Isaac Valencia began negotiating with Saldívar. They ran a telephone line to their base of operations adjacent to Saldívar's pickup truck as the standoff continued. Lead negotiator Young tried to establish a rapport with Saldívar and persuade her to give herself up. Valencia suggested the shooting was accidental. Saldívar later changed her story, saying the "gun went off" by itself. She spoke to relatives in addition to speaking with police. Motel guests were ordered to remain in their rooms until police escorted them out. Later that afternoon, police drained the gasoline from the gas tank of Saldívar's vehicle and turned on floodlights.

After the standoff entered its fourth hour, Valencia succeeded in getting Saldívar to confess that she had intended to shoot herself. She said when she placed the revolver to her own head, Selena tried to tell her not to kill herself. When Selena opened the door to leave, Saldívar said she told her to close it. She also said the revolver went off when Selena left. During the sixth hour, Saldívar agreed to give herself up, but when she saw a police officer pointing a rifle at her, she panicked, ran back to her truck, picked up the revolver and pointed it at her head again.

Saldívar surrendered after more than nine hours. By then, hundreds of Selena's fans had gathered at the scene. Many wept as police took Saldívar away. A press conference was called within hours of Selena's murder; Saldívar had not yet been named in media reports. Selena's father and Assistant Police Chief Ken Bung told the press the possible motive was the singer's intention to terminate Saldívar's employment.

== Impact ==
=== Media response ===
When San Antonio radio station KEDA-AM broke the news of Selena's death, many people assumed the staff were lying because the next day was April Fools' Day. Other major Spanish-language radio stations in San Antonio, including Tejano 107, KXTN-FM and KRIO-FM, began monitoring developments. Radio stations in Texas began playing Selena's music non-stop and taking telephone calls from distressed fans. All major U.S. networks interrupted their regular programming to break the news. The lead item on news programs in Corpus Christi had been the end of the 1994–95 Major League Baseball strike. Within thirty minutes of its announcement, however, Selena's murder was the lead item on all television stations in South Texas.

Selena's death was front-page news in The New York Times for two days, and was featured prominently on BBC World News. News of the singer's death reached Japan, where David Byrne first heard of the shooting. Univision and Telemundo were among the first national news stations to arrive at the crime scene. Coverage of the singer's death and the murder trial dominated American newscasts in 1995. Carlos Lopez of KMIQ-105.1 told the Corpus Christi Caller-Times that "Tejano music is dead for at least today" and compared the reactions to Selena's death to reactions to the Wall Street Crash of 1929 and called March 31, 1995, "Black Friday". The media response the murder received was "unprecedented" for a Latin artist, and Hispanic writers expressed how the mainstream media typically ignored "people from the border".

Newsstands were swarmed by people looking for items concerning Selena. A line for the edition of April 1, 1995, of the Caller Times formed. The company added 11,000 copies to their print run and later printed 20,000 more copies to meet continued demand for the paper. Texas newspaper The Monitor, sold out two issues in the days following the singer's death, "a truly remarkable feat" said writer Daniel Cavazos. He continued that the event of a newspaper issue selling out happens once every two-three decades. A People magazine issue was released several days after her murder. Despite its publishers' assumption that interest would soon wane, a commemorative issue sold nearly a million copies, selling the entire first and second run within two weeks. It became a collector's item—a first in the history of People. Betty Cortina, editor of People, later said, "it was unheard of" for an issue to completely sell out. In the following months, the success of the Selena issue led the company to release People en Español aimed at the Latino market. This was followed by Newsweek en Español and Latina magazine.

American actress Jennifer Lopez was cast to play Selena in the 1997 biopic film about her life; this choice drew criticism because Lopez' ancestry is Puerto Rican rather than Mexican. After the film's release, fans changed their views on Lopez after seeing her performance in the movie. Lopez became famous after the film's release. Selena: The Series is an American biographical drama streaming television series created by Moisés Zamora and starring Christian Serratos. The series was released on Netflix on December 4, 2020. The second and final part of the series premiered on May 4, 2021.

Selena's life and career were covered by a number of television programs, including The Oprah Winfrey Show, E! True Hollywood Story, VH1's Behind the Music, American Justice, Snapped, and Famous Crime Scene. Other networks including MTV, Investigation Discovery, The Biography Channel, and A&E Network have aired special programs about Selena, while Spanish-language networks regularly show documentaries to commemorate the anniversary of her death. These Spanish-language documentaries often score record ratings for Spanish networks. A documentary titled Selena, A Star is Dimmed—one of the first about her—was broadcast on Univison's Primer Impacto on April 22, 1995. It was watched by 2.09 million people and became the second-most-viewed Spanish-language show in the history of American television at the time.

Networks competed with each other to interview Saldívar about the shooting. When the news came out that Arrarás was able to interview her, Univision was inundated with requests to use the interview from major networks as far away as Germany. The interview on Primer Impacto was watched by 4.5 million viewers; it was the most-watched program that night according to the Nielsen ratings, and became one of the most-watched Spanish-language programs in American television history.

=== Latino community ===
I grew up around these people. The reaction was typical of the majority of Texans, to whom the murder of Selena was just another senseless shooting. To those people, though, the five million Texans of Mexican descent, the death of Selena was Black Friday, a day of infamy even darker and more evil than the assassination of John F. Kennedy.

— An Anglo-American Selena fan, explaining differences in reaction to the death of Selena between Anglo-Americans and Mexican-Americans in Texas.

The news of Selena's death deeply affected the Latino community. Many people traveled thousands of miles to visit Selena's house, boutiques, and the crime scene. Hispanics throughout the United States reportedly mourned the singer as far away as New York City and Los Angeles. By mid-afternoon, police were asked to form a detour as a line of automobiles began backing up traffic from the Quintanillas' house. On the street where Selena had lived, gang graffiti and cacti distinguished the blue-collar community from other subdivisions across America.

A chain-link fence in front of Selena's house became a shrine festooned with mementos as fans from across America left messages to Selena and the Quintanilla family. Most car drivers in Corpus Christi, and those driving cars on Interstate 37 from Mexico, turned their headlights on in her memory. Fans scribbled notes and messages, and placed them on the door and doorstep of the room in which Selena had been shot.

Soon after learning of Selena's death, people began speculating about the identity of her murderer. Some fans thought Emilio Navaira's wife had shot Selena; they believed she was jealous of Selena and Navaira's relationship. Johnny Pasillas, Emilio's brother-in-law and manager, frantically called radio stations in an attempt to quash the rumor. Among the celebrities who believed the rumor were record producer Manny Guerra, Pete Rodriguez, and American singer Ramon Hernandez. According to anchorwoman Arrarás, Selena's death became "the most important news [story] of the year for Latinos". Texas Monthly editor Pamela Colloff wrote that reactions to her death were equivalent to those following a political assassination. Reactions were compared to those that followed the deaths of John Lennon, Elvis Presley, and John F. Kennedy.

Selena had a "cult-like" following among Latinos; after her death she became a household name in the United States and a part of the American pop culture. She was more popular after her death than when she was alive. Selena became a cultural icon for Latinos and was seen as "a woman who was proud of her roots [who had] achieved her dreams". According to Antonio Lopez of The Santa Fe New Mexican, the day Selena was killed "is a bookmark in time in the memories of many Latinos". According to Arrarás, "women imitated her, men worshiped her". In the aftermath of Selena's murder, two linked deaths in California were reported. A drag queen planned to dress as Selena for a performance; he was hit by a car and left to die. Actress Gloria de la Cruz auditioned for the role of Selena; her body was later found in a dumpster in Los Angeles. Her killer had strangled her and set her body on fire.

=== Celebrities' and politicians' reactions ===
Spanish singer Julio Iglesias interrupted a recording session in Miami for a moment of silence. Among the celebrities who contacted the Quintanilla family following the news were Gloria Estefan, Celia Cruz, Julio Iglesias, and Madonna. Concerts throughout Texas were canceled; La Mafia canceled their concert in Guatemala and flew back to Texas. Tejano singer Ramiro Herrera and dozens of other Tejano artists also canceled their concerts. Ben Benavidez, radio personality and owner of Tejano Review, told Corpus Christi Caller Times that March 31 would be remembered as "the worst day in Corpus Christi history".

American singer-songwriter Rhett Lawrence published an advertisement in Billboard magazine's April 22, 1995 issue; it said, "music I heard with you was more than music. You will be deeply missed." Other celebrities interviewed on radio stations, including Stefanie Ridel, Jaime DeAnda (of Los Chamacos), Elsa Garcia, and Shelly Lares, expressed their thoughts about Selena's death. Talk show host Oprah Winfrey called Selena's life "short but significant" during a March 1997 episode of The Oprah Winfrey Show. American singer-songwriter Mariah Carey told MTV Selena's death was shocking to her because of "the way it had happened so abruptly in a young life".

American singer Marc Anthony dedicated his album Todo a Su Tiempo (which was released two months after Selena's death) to Selena. State senator Carlos Truan and state representative Solomon P. Ortiz reportedly mourned Selena's death. American music industry executive Daniel Glass told Texas Monthly he believed Selena would have enjoyed greater career success had it not been for her death. A few days after her death, then-president of the United States Bill Clinton and his wife Hillary sent a letter of condolence to Selena's husband Chris Pérez.

A few days later, Howard Stern mocked Selena's murder, burial, and mourners, and criticized her music. Stern said, "This music does absolutely nothing for me. Alvin and the Chipmunks have more soul ... Spanish people have the worst taste in music. They have no depth." He then played Selena's songs with gunshot noises in the background. Stern's comments and actions outraged and infuriated the Latino community in Texas. After an arrest warrant for disorderly conduct was issued for him in Harlingen, Texas, Stern made an on-air statement, in Spanish, saying his comments were not made to cause "more anguish to her family, friends and those who loved her".

The League of United Latin American Citizens found Stern's apology unacceptable and urged a boycott of his show. Texas retailers removed products related to Stern. Sears and McDonald's sent a letter expressing their disapproval of Stern's comments to the media because fans believed they sponsored his show. Within a week, on NBC's The Tonight Show with Jay Leno, Stern and his co-host Robin Quivers were asked if Stern's remarks about Selena were acceptable. Quivers decided not to talk about the situation to avoid arguing with Stern. When Linda Ronstadt, a pop singer of Mexican-American heritage, appeared on the show, she defended Selena, and argued with Quivers over the matter.

=== Other reactions ===
On April 12, 1995, two weeks after Selena's death, then-Texas governor and future U.S. President George W. Bush declared her birthday Selena Day in Texas. Bush said Selena represented "the essence of south Texas culture". On Selena Day, approximately 1,000 fans gathered at her grave and began singing traditional Mexican folk songs; police were brought in to control the crowd. On the same day, a crowd of three thousand attended an organized mass of the resurrection for Selena at Johnnyland Concert Park.

In April and May that year, some Anglo-Americans in Texas wrote to the editor of the Brazosport Facts questioning the fuss over her death; some were offended because Selena Day coincided with Easter Sunday. Others said, "Easter is more important than Selena Day," and believed people should let Selena rest in peace and get on with their lives. Mexican-Americans living in Texas also wrote to the newspaper; some felt that others were too critical of Selena Day, stating they did not need to celebrate the day and should not have responded to its announcement so rudely.

This was also seen by the Caller Times, which said it had printed several of the negative comments left by people and that many other comments were "unprintable". Latino filmmaker Lourdes Portillo said she did not know who Selena was when she heard about the shooting. The Monitor received negative backlash from some readers who felt it was "enough" of having Selena featured on the front page of their newspaper. A reader called The Monitor and stated that intelligent people had no interest in Selena. In response, an editor said "I hope not. That would make for a lot of idiots in [South Texas]."

When the news of Selena's death broke, some Americans asked who she was and said she was "not that important", suggesting Latinos "get over it". Author and Texas Monthly magazine contributor Joe Nick Patoski said Anglo-Americans and Mexican-Americans were divided in their reactions to Selena's death. Patoski said that Anglo-Americans "didn't understand what all the fuss was about". This was echoed in the Caller Times, where they found racial divisions in the reactions to Selena's death. Educators who had observed the reactions said, "the emergence of an icon in a minority culture can be both bewildering and threatening to Anglos".

Melicent Rothschild said some Americans often do not understand "the cultural role models of groups who have felt discriminated against". Following Selena's death, cultural confrontations were reported. Some vocally opposed any memorials to the singer, feeling they would be paid for by taxpayers. Others complained to newspapers about the media interest in Selena's death. Many media outlets received negative comments from people around the country. Some were baffled that the Rossler massacre, which occurred around the same time of Selena's death, did not generate the same amount of media exposure. Mayor Mary Rhodes of Corpus Christi said many of the people complaining about the media exposure Selena was receiving had never heard of her.

Ramiro Burr of the San Antonio Express-News confirmed that the reactions of non-Hispanics were due to a language barrier. Dolph Tillotson, a columnist in The Galveston Daily News, was "mystified" about his newspaper's coverage on Selena's death, whom he never heard of. Tillotson was baffled that the singer was important to Hispanics and relatively unknown to most Anglo-Americans. He wrote how grateful he was to the newspaper's Hispanic staff who explained the singer's cultural importance to him.

In the 1997 biopic film about Selena, a store manager asks Latinos running towards the singer for an autograph, "Who's Selena?" Anglo-American viewers felt the scene was "irrelevant" and "over dramatized". One Selena fan said the event depicted in the scene "happens all the time" to Latinos and their friends, and that they felt their community had been "ignored". Lauraine Miller said, "Selena has opened my eyes", and that Miller had become "more American". Another fan said, "nobody ever lets you forget you are Mexican American" in the U.S.

=== Music industry ===
At the time of Selena's death, 52% of all Latin music sales were generated by regional Mexican music. Most of this was Tejano, which had become one of the most popular Latin music genres. Selena's music led the genre's 1990s revival and made it marketable for the first time. Many media outlets described her as the "Queen of Tejano Music". (Note: Outlets describing Selena as "Queen of Tejano Music" include Entertainment Weekly, Billboard magazine, Los Angeles Magazine, Vibe magazine, The Huffington Post, and The New York Times.) Major record companies including EMI Records, SBK Records, Warner Music Group, CBS Records, and Sony Music began signing Tejano artists to compete in the Latin music market. Following Selena's death, the Tejano music market suffered and its popularity waned. Radio stations in the United States that played Tejano music switched to regional Mexican music, and by 1997, KQQK was the only radio station playing non-stop Tejano music.

By the mid-2000s, radio stations in the United States no longer played Tejano music, large auditoria stopped hosting Tejano artists by 2007, and major record companies abandoned their Tejano artists after 1995. Selena remains the best-selling Tejano artist of all time, and continues to outsell living Tejano artists. She remains the only Tejano musician whose recordings continue to chart on the U.S. Billboard 200 chart. (Note: According to author Joe Nick Patoski in 2000, Selena was the last Tejano recording artist to have appeared on the Billboard 200 chart. Her music last appeared on the chart in April 2015 after the release of Lo Mejor de...Selena.) After her death, Tejano music was replaced with Latin pop as the most popular Latin music genre in the United States.

Within hours of Selena's murder, record stores sold out of her albums; EMI Latin began pressing several million CDs and cassettes to meet the expected demand. Gloria Ballesteros, a sales representative of Southwestern Wholesalers in San Antonio, told Billboard their inventory of 5,000 copies of Selena albums was sold out by the afternoon of her death. Record stores ordering more copies of her recordings were told by EMI Latin representatives they would not be able to restock for a few days. EMI Latin shipped 500,000 units of Selena's recordings to stores in the two weeks following her death. Her song "Fotos y Recuerdos" was number four on the US Billboard Hot Latin Tracks chart the day she was killed; it peaked at number one on April 15, 1995.

Selena's singles "No Me Queda Más", "Bidi Bidi Bom Bom", "Como la Flor", and "Amor Prohibido", re-entered the Hot Latin Tracks and the Regional Mexican Airplay chart in the issue of Billboard magazine dated April 15, 1995. Selena's 1994 album Amor Prohibido re-entered the Billboard 200 chart at number 92, representing a 520 percent increase in sales. 12,040 units sold the week Selena was murdered. The following week, the album rose to number 32 with 28,238 units sold representing a 135 percent increase.

Amor Prohibido, which was positioned at number four on March 31, peaked at number one on the Top Latin Albums chart in the issue dated April 15, 1995. Three albums, Entre a Mi Mundo (1992), Live! (1993), and 12 Super Éxitos (1994), re-entered the Top Latin Albums chart, while Selena's albums took chart positions one to four on the Regional Mexican Albums chart that same week. Her albums sparked a buying frenzy for Regional music in Japan, Germany, and China.

Dreaming of You, the crossover album Selena was working on at the time of her death, was released in July 1995. On the day of its release, 175,000 copies were sold in the U.S.—a record for a female vocalist—and 331,000 copies sold in its first week. Selena became the third female artist after Janet Jackson and Mariah Carey to sell over 300,000 units in one week. It debuted at number one on the Billboard 200 chart, becoming the first album by a Latino artist to do so. Dreaming of You was the first posthumous album by a solo artist to debut at number one. The recording was among the top ten best-selling debuts for a musician, and was the best-selling debut by a female act.

Dreaming of You joined five of Selena's studio albums on the Billboard 200 chart simultaneously, making her the first female artist in Billboard history to accomplish this feat. The Recording Industry Association of America (RIAA) certified it 59x platinum for sales of 3.54 million album-equivalent units in the U.S. As of October 2017, it has sold over 2.942 million copies in the United States, becoming the best-selling Latin album of all-time in the country according to Nielsen SoundScan. As of 2015, the recording has sold five million copies worldwide.

Five of Selena's albums generated $4 million in sales within five years. Selena was inducted into the Billboard Latin Music Hall of Fame, the Hard Rock Cafe's Hall of Fame in 1995, the South Texas Music Hall of Fame, and the Tejano Music Hall of Fame in 2001. In December 1999, she was named the "top Latin artist of the '90s" and "best-selling Latin artist of the decade" by Billboard for her fourteen top-ten singles—including seven number-one hits—in the Top Latin Songs chart.

== Funeral and tributes ==
On the day Selena was killed, vigils and memorials were held throughout Texas and California. In San Antonio, radio station Tejano 107 sponsored a candlelight vigil at the Sunken Gardens, while KRIO-FM sponsored another at South Park Mall on March 31 which was attended by 5,000 people. Radio stations in Texas played her music non-stop. On April 1, Bayfront Plaza in Corpus Christi held a vigil which drew 3,000 fans. During the event, it was announced that a public viewing of her casket would be held at the Bayfront Auditorium the following day. Fans lined up for almost a mile (1500 m).

An hour before the doors opened, rumors that the casket was empty began circulating, which prompted the Quintanilla family to have an open-casket viewing. About 30,000 to 40,000 fans passed by Selena's casket. More than 78,000 signed a book of condolence. Flowers for the casket viewing were imported from The Netherlands. At the request of Selena's family, video and flash photography were banned. The same day, an unannounced bilingual Sunday morning Mass for Selena featuring a mariachi choir was held at the San Fernando Cathedral in downtown San Antonio. In the United States, many churches with a high proportion of Latino worshippers held prayers for Selena.

A reporter noticed that many "mythic symbols" such as the Christian symbols of angels, saints, healers, and saviors, were "attached to Selena" by fans. There was a tribute for the singer during a St. Patrick's Day celebration in a Catholic church in Houston, Texas. Friar Sal DeGeorge decided to hold a tribute to Selena that day after people—especially children—asked him what was being planned for the singer. That same day, a disc jockey played Selena's music near the church in a small park.

On April 3, 1995, six hundred guests—mostly family members—attended Selena's burial at Seaside Memorial Park, which was broadcast live by a Corpus Christi and San Antonio radio station without the consent of her family. A Jehovah's Witness minister from Lake Jackson preached in English, quoting Paul the Apostle's words in 1 Corinthians 15. Hundreds of people began circling the area in their vehicles. Among the celebrities who attended the funeral were Roberto Pulido, Bobby Pulido, David Lee Garza, Navaira, Laura Canales, Elsa Garcia, La Mafia, Ram Herrera, Imagen Latina, and Pete Astudillo. Coincidentally, Selena’s funeral occurred on the same day as a workplace shooting (which also occurred in Corpus Christi) that resulted in the deaths of 5 people (excluding the perpetrator); news of the incident was not covered much since it was overshadowed by news coverage of the funeral.

A special Mass held the same day at Los Angeles Sports Arena drew a crowd of 4,000. Selena had been booked to play there that night for her Amor Prohibido Tour. The promoter charged an admission fee, which upset her father Quintanilla, Jr. Friar Modesto Lopez Portillo drove from El Salvador to Los Angeles, California to be the officiating priest for the gathering; the consul general of El Salvador attended as well. In Lake Jackson, a thousand fans and friends of Selena gathered at the municipal park in neighboring Clute, where she had played at the Mosquito Festival in July 1994. The next day, Our Lady of the Pillar, a church in Zaragoza, Spain, held a Mass for Selena which drew 450 people to the 225-seat church. In the weeks following her death, cars throughout Texas were seen with pictures of Selena painted on them. On April 28, during a fireworks display for Buccaneer Days in Corpus Christi, the music was reworked to include "Bidi Bidi Bom Bom" in her memory. Selena Etc. boutiques became shrines to the singer as fans left balloons, flowers, pictures, and poems. Street murals of Selena were found across Texas after her death.

In the months following Selena's death, an average of 12,000 people visited her grave site and the Days Inn motel where the shooting occurred. The motel's manager rearranged its room numbers so guests would not know in which room Selena had been shot. The singer became part of the Day of the Dead celebration. In 1997, Selena was commemorated with a museum and a life-sized bronze statue, Mirador de la Flor, in Corpus Christi, which are visited by hundreds of fans each week. Fans flocked to her statue and murals, seeing them as symbols of self-identity, unionism, religious expression, resistance, self-expression, equality, liberation, passion, optimism, possibility, and "encouragement and hope to the poor".

Musicians used music to express their thoughts about Selena or recorded compositions as tributes to her. These included American country artist Tony Joe White, Haitian singer-songwriter Wyclef Jean, American Tejano artist Pete Astudillo, Puerto Rican group the Barrio Boyzz, Mexican American singer Graciela Beltran, American Tejano artist Jennifer Pena, American hip-hop singer Lil Ray, American Tejano artists Emilio Navaira, Bobby Pulido, Cuban salsa singer Celia Cruz, Dominican salsa singer José Alberto "El Canario", Puerto Rican salsa singers Ray Sepulveda, Michael Stuart, Manny Manuel, Puerto Rican jazz singer Hilton Ruiz, American singer Jenni Rivera, Mexican singer Lupillo Rivera, Venezuelan-born Spanish rock singer Mikel Erentxun, Puerto Rican singer Tony Garcia, and American rapper King L.

Selena's family and her former band Los Dinos held a tribute concert a week after the 10th anniversary of her murder on April 7, 2005. The concert, titled Selena ¡VIVE!, was broadcast live on Univision and achieved a 35.9 household rating. It was the highest-rated and most-viewed Spanish-language television special in the history of American television. It was the most-watched program—regardless of language—among adults ages 18 to 34 in Los Angeles, Chicago, and San Francisco; it tied for first in New York, beating that night's episode of Fox's American Idol. Among Latino viewers, figures for Selena ¡VIVE! exceeded those for Super Bowl XLV between the Pittsburgh Steelers and the Green Bay Packers and the telenovela Soy Tu Dueña, during what was the "most-watched NFL season ever among Latinos".

In January 2015, it was announced that a two-day annual event called Fiesta de la Flor would be held in Corpus Christi by the Corpus Christi Visitors Bureau as a tribute to Selena. Musical acts for the first annual event included Kumbia All-Starz, Chris Pérez, Los Lobos, Jay Perez, Little Joe y la Familia, Los Palominos, Stefani Montiel of Las 3 Divas, Girl in a Coma's Nina Diaz, Las Fenix, and The Voice competitor Clarissa Serna. The event raised $13 million and was attended by 52,000 people, 72% of whom lived outside Corpus Christi. The event sparked interest from people in thirty-five U.S. states and five countries including Mexico, Brazil, and Ecuador.

== Trial ==
Within twenty minutes of Saldívar's surrender, she was taken to the downtown police station in Corpus Christi and placed in an interrogation room with investigators Paul and Ray Rivera. Paul Rivera, who had investigated homicides since 1978, informed Saldívar of her right to an attorney, which she waived. When investigators surrounded Saldívar's truck, she had cried out, "I can't believe I killed my best friend". Within hours, she was saying the shooting was accidental. Saldívar's bail bond was initially set at $100,000, but District Attorney Carlos Valdez persuaded the presiding judge to raise it to $500,000.

When bail was announced, fans asked why the death penalty had not been sought. The Nueces County jail was deluged with death threats and there were public calls for vigilante justice. Some gang members in Texas were reported to have taken up collections to raise the bond for Saldívar so they could kill her when she was released. In prison, she faced more death threats from other inmates. The Mexican Mafia, a dominant gang in the Texas penal system, reportedly placed a price on Saldívar's head and spread the word that anyone who committed the crime would be a hero.

Saldívar's crime was punishable by up to 99 years in prison and a $10,000 fine. She was kept at Nueces County jail under a suicide watch before her trial. The State of Texas had difficulty arranging defense counsel for Saldívar; a spokesperson said any lawyer defending her could face death threats. Eventually, Saldívar was assigned a public defender named Douglas Tinker. Tinker's wife feared they would suffer from community retribution and urged him not to take the case. Arnold Garcia, a former district prosecutor, was appointed as co-counsel.

District Attorney Carlos Valdez, who lived a few blocks away from Selena's family, chose Mark Skurka as the lead prosecutor. Judge Mike Westergren presided over the case, which was moved to the Harris County Courthouse in Houston to ensure an impartial jury. According to the Chicago Tribune, the trial's publicity "rivaled that of the O. J. Simpson proceedings." Westergren ordered that the trial would not be televised or taped, and limited the number of reporters in the courtroom, to avoid a "repeat of the Simpson circus."

The Tribune reported the division of interest in the trial between Latinos and white Americans. Donna Dickerson, a white American magazine publisher, told the Tribune she had no interest in the trial because of Selena's "Latino background", and said Mexican-Americans had not shown the same enthusiasm after the death of Elvis Presley. Saldívar's trial was called the "trial of the century" and the most important trial to the Latino population. It generated interest in Europe, South America, Australia and Japan.

Saldívar pleaded not guilty, continuing to insist the shooting was accidental. In his opening statement, Valdez said he believed Saldívar "deliberately killed Selena". Tinker said the shooting was accidental and denied rumors Saldívar wanted to be romantically involved with Selena. On October 23, 1995, the jury deliberated for two hours before finding Saldívar guilty of murder. She was sentenced to life imprisonment with eligibility for parole in 2025. On November 22, 1995, she arrived at the Gatesville Unit—now the Christina Crain Unit—in Gatesville, Texas, for processing.

As of 2025, Saldívar remains incarcerated in Gatesville at the Patrick O'Daniel Unit (formerly Mountain View Unit), which is operated by the Texas Department of Criminal Justice. Because of multiple internal death threats from incarcerated Selena fans, Saldívar was placed in isolation and spends 23 hours a day alone in her 9 by 6 feet (2.7 by 1.8 m) cell. In 2002, under a judge's order, the gun used to kill Selena was destroyed and the pieces were thrown into Corpus Christi Bay. Fans and historians disapproved of the decision to destroy the gun, saying the event was historical and the gun should have been preserved in a museum.

Saldívar's petition for parole was denied on March 27, 2025; the next parole review is set for March 30, 2030.

== See also ==
- 1995 in music
- 1995 in Latin music
- 1995 in the United States
- Christina Grimmie
- Murder of Dimebag Darrell
- Governorship of George W. Bush
- History of the United States (1991–present)
- History of Texas
- Murder of John Lennon
- Rebecca Schaeffer
- Sharon Tate
