= Selena Live! =

Live!

Live album by Selena
- Released: May 4, 1993
- Recorded: February 7, 1993
- Venue: Memorial Coliseum
- Genre: Tejano
- Length: 55:47
- Language: Spanish
- Label: EMI Latin
- Producer: A.B. Quintanilla

Selena chronology
| Entre a Mi Mundo (1992) | Live! (1993) | Mis Mejores Canciones – 17 Super Éxitos (1993) |

Singles from Live!
- 1. "No Debes Jugar" Released: April 29, 1993; 2. "La Llamada" Released: October 18, 1993

Live! or Selena Live! is a live album by American Tejano pop singer Selena, which was released on May 4, 1993, by EMI Latin. The album was re-released on September 22, 2002, as being part of the Selena: 20 Years of Music collection; which included spoken liner notes by her family, friends and her former band members Selena y Los Dinos. Live! includes three cumbia-influenced studio tracks, while the rest of the album consists of live versions of previously released songs. The album was recorded during a free concert at the Memorial Coliseum in Corpus Christi, Texas, on February 7, 1993. It was certified gold (Latin type) by the Recording Industry Association of America in its first year, double platinum in 1995, and 8× platinum in 2017.

Live! led Selena to win a Grammy Award for Best Mexican-American Album at the 36th Grammy Awards, the first Tejano musician to do so. It had won two awards from the 1994 Billboard Latin Music Awards, and three awards at the 1994 Tejano Music Awards. Live! peaked at number one on the US Regional Mexican Albums, number two on the Top Latin Albums and number 79 on the Billboard 200. Soon after the release of Live!, the album received mostly positive reviews from music critics who claimed the album was "foreshadowing" Amor Prohibido (1994), and that Selena was the Mexican equivalent of Madonna. The album spawned three singles, which were simultaneously in the top five positions on the Hot Latin Tracks chart.

== Production and development ==
In early 1993, Abraham Quintanilla Jr.—band manager and father of Selena, A.B. Quintanilla, and Suzette Quintanilla—sent in a request for EMI Latin to release a live album. After the company accepted, Abraham rented out the Memorial Coliseum for February 7, 1993. It was advertised in local newspapers, while an unspecified number of tickets were given to radio programmers and deejays in South Texas for their giveaway promotions.

== Synopsis ==
The show featured Selena y Los Dinos; Selena as lead vocals along with backup vocalist Pete Astudillo, A.B. on bass, Suzette on drums, the singer's husband Chris Perez on electric guitar, Ricky Vela and Joe Ojeda on keyboards. There was no set list for the show, the band performed live in front of 3,000 and free-flowed with A.B. choosing the songs that the band would perform. The show began with the songs "Como la Flor" and "Baila Esta Cumbia", the singer asked Suzette's fiancé Billy Arriaga on stage to perform with her.

According to Perez, the band performed an unspecified number of songs that night that were ultimately left out of the album. He explained in a 2002 interview how one of those songs included the original version of "Bidi Bidi Bom Bom," which was later released on Amor Prohibido in 1994 .

== Song structure and lyrical content ==
"No Debes Jugar", the lead single from Live!, was written and produced by A.B. Quintanilla, Selena's brother and the producer of her music, lead keyboardist for the band Ricky Vela, and Bebu Silvetti, an Argentine music producer. "No Debes Jugar" is a Mexican cumbia rock song that centers the organ as its musical instrument foundation. Ramiro Burr of the Houston Chronicle stated that Selena blended Mexican polka rhythms with melodic, synth-driven pop hooks in "No Debes Jugar" and "La Llamada". "No Debes Jugar" received a Song of the Year nomination at the 1994 Tejano Music Awards. "No Debes Jugar" is performed on F major with 89 beats per minute. Lyrically the song describes a woman whose life is centered on being unappreciated by her boyfriend. Tired and ready to do anything, she finally stands up for herself announcing that she is done playing around and threatens to leave. It peaked at number three on the US Hot Latin Tracks, Latin Regional Mexican Airplay and the Latin Pop Airplay charts simultaneously.

"La Llamada", the second promotional single released from Live!, was written and produced by Quintanilla III and Astudillo. Howard Blumenthal wrote in his book The world music CD listener's guide that "La Llamada" is an "energetic" song. It is set in A major with 90 beats per minute. "La Llamada" describes a woman telling her boyfriend over the phone that she saw him kissing another girl, while her boyfriend tries to persuade to her that it was not him. It peaked at number five on the Hot Latin Tracks, number six on the Latin Regional Mexican Airplay and number eight on the Latin Pop Airplay chart. "Tú Robaste Mi Corazón" is a duet with "The King of Tejano music" singer Emilio Navaira. It was released as the second promotional single from Live! and was written and produced by Quintanilla III, Vela and Silvetti. Blumenthal wrote in his book that the song is a "great love duet". Paul Verna wrote that Selena's fans were "not growing weary" of "Como Quisiera" (Preciosa) and "Tú Robaste Mi Corazón". He also noted that the two songs were "slow-paced love songs" and were potential singles from the posthumous album Siempre Selena (1996). "Tú Robaste Mi Corazón" is composed in the key F major with 130 beats per minute. The song describes a woman and a man finding harmony and love in each other while also feeling emotions never felt before in their lives. "Tú Robaste Mi Corazón" peaked at number five on the Hot Latin Tracks, number eight on the Latin Regional Mexican Airplay and number six on the Latin Pop Airplay charts.

== Critical reception ==
Professional ratings
Review scores
| Source | Rating |
|---|---|
| Allmusic | 4.5/5 stars |

Sarah M. Misemer wrote in her book Secular saints: performing Frida Kahlo, Carlos Gardel, Eva Perón, and Selena that Live! and Amor Prohibido (1994) were the two most successful albums of Selena's career. Joey Guerra of Amazon.com wrote that Live! is a "sizzling reminder of [Selena's] electric stage charisma and blossoming talent as a performer". Guerra also stated that the songs performed live had showcased Selena's "uncanny ability to infuse a love song with both girlish innocence and a heated sexuality". He noted that "Como La Flor", "Baila Esta Cumbia" and "La Carcacha" were examples of his claims. He also states that any listener can feel the "heat seeping through your speakers". Guerra ended his review stating that Live! "foreshadows" Amor Prohibido (1994). Stephen Thomas Erlewine of Allmusic wrote that Live! had offered proof of Selena being an "energetic [and] exciting performer". Erlewine noted that Selena performed live versions of her "most popular numbers" in front of an "enthusiastic audience". Erlewine ended his review stating that Live! had "capture[d] some of that energy and shows why she was so popular". Shortly after the album's release music critics began calling Selena the Mexican equivalent of Madonna.

=== Awards and nominations ===
Live! was the first Tejano album to have won a Grammy Award. The album won the Best Mexican-American Album at the 1994 ceremony. EMI Latin's president believed Selena was ready to record and release a crossover album that would have catapulted her career into the English-language market. Selena was then signed with SBK Records in November 1993, however, recording for the album would not begin until a year later. In May 1994, Live! was named Album of the Year by the Billboard Latin Music Awards. The album also led Selena to win Regional Mexican Vocalist of the Year. At the 1994 Tejano Music Awards, Selena won Female Vocalist of the Year, Album of the Year – Orchestra and was named Female Entertainer of The Year, while the album was nominated for Record of the Year. At the 1994 Lo Nuestro Awards, it was nominated Regional Mexican Album of the Year.

== Commercial performance ==
Live! was released on May 4, 1993. It was certified gold (Latin type) by the Recording Industry Association of America for shipments of 100,000 copies in the United States its first year. On April 22, 1995, the album debuted at number 146 on the US Billboard 200 chart following Selena's murder the month prior. The album peaked at number 79 on May 13, 1995, before it slipped off the chart on June 3, 1995. Live! debuted at number four on the Top Latin Albums chart, it then peaked at number three within three months of its release. The album remained on the chart, taking the top 20 spots. Live! temporarily slipped off the charts and re-entered at number 47 in January 1995, before it went off the chart again. The album took the third spot on the chart following Selena's murder. A week later, the album peaked at number two before it hovered the top ten spots and then slipped off the charts a year later. In 1995, Live! was then certified Gold for shipments of 500,000 copies. Live! debuted at number eight on the Latin Regional Mexican Albums chart, then slipped off the charts for nearly a month. It reentered and peaked at number one for seven consecutive weeks. The album remained in the top 10 for two years. The album went to number two following Selena's murder. Live! sold more than 250,000 copies in Mexico.

== Track listing ==
- Track listing were adapted from Allmusic.

| No. | Title | Writer(s) | Length |
|---|---|---|---|
| 1. | "Como la Flor/Baila Esta Cumbia" | Selena Quintanilla, A.B. Quintanilla III, Pete Astudillo, Ricky Vela | 9:45 |
| 2. | "Amame, Quiéreme/Siempre Estoy Pensando en Ti" | Quintanilla III, Astudillo | 3:48 |
| 3. | "Ven Conmigo/Perdóname" | Quintanilla III, Astudillo | 6:34 |
| 4. | "¿Qué Creias?" | Quintanilla III, Astudillo | 3:35 |
| 5. | "Si la Quieres" | Vela | 3:17 |
| 6. | "¿Porque le Gusta Bailar Cumbia?" | Astudillo | 3:52 |
| 7. | "La Carcacha/Besitos" | Quintanilla III, Astudillo | 6:54 |
| 8. | "Ya Ves/Las Cadenas/Yo Te Amo" | Quintanilla III, Astudillo, Vela | 8:11 |
| 9. | "No Debes Jugar" | Quintanilla III, Vela | 2:50 |
| 10. | "Tú Robaste Mi Corazón" (featuring Emilio Navaira) | Quintanilla III, Vela | 3:50 |
| 11. | "La Llamada" | Quintanilla III, Astudillo | 3:12 |

2002 re-release bonus track
| No. | Title | Writer(s) | Length |
|---|---|---|---|
| 12. | "Spoken Liner Notes" (This track includes spoken words by Selena's family, friends, and band) | Brian "Red" Moore | 33:46 |

2026 remastered edition
| No. | Title | Writer(s) | Length |
|---|---|---|---|
| 7. | "Missing My Baby" | Quintanilla III | 3:58 |

== Personnel ==
Credits are taken from the album's liner notes.

Managerial

- A&R – José Behar
- Producer – A.B. Quintanilla III, Bebu Silvetti
- Executive producer – Jorge Alberto Pino, Abraham Quintanilla Jr.
- Marketing – José Behar, Suzette Quintanilla
- Management – José Behar

Performance credits

- Vocals – Selena Quintanilla-Pérez

Visuals and imagery

- Art direction – Lisette Lorenzo
- Clothing design – Selena, Martin Gomez
- Hair stylist – Rosa Sullivan, Mark Duncan
- Make-up – Lisette Lorenzo
- Photography – Maurice Rinaldi
- Stylist – Martin Gomez

Instruments

- Drums – Suzette Quintanilla
- Guitar- Chris Pérez, A.B. Quintanilla III, Henry Gomez
- Keyboards – Joe Ojeda, Ricky Vela
- Accordion- Johnny Saenz
- Trumpet – Rene Gasca
- Trombone – Gilbert Garza
- Bajo Sexto – A.B. Quintanilla III

Technical and production

- Arrangement – Joe Ojeda, Chris Perez, Ricky Vela
- Songwriters – A.B. Quintanilla III, Selena, Ricky Vela, Pete Astudillo, Chris Perez, Jorge Luis Borrego, Chrissie Hynde, Barrio Boyzz, K. C Porter, Miguel Flores, Suzette Quintanilla, Abraham Quintanilla Jr,
- Engineering – Brian "Red" Moore, Malcolm Harper, Ron Morales, Mark Sadler
- Engineering assistants – Suzette Quintanilla, Abraham Quintanilla Jr
- Executive producers – Jorge Alberto Pino
- Mastering - Bob Ludwig
- Mixing – Manny Guerra, Ron Morales, Mark Sadler
- Mixing assistants – A.B. Quintanilla III
- Production – A.B. Quintanilla III, José Behar, Jorge Alberto Pino, Guillermo Johnson Page, Gregg Vickers, Brain "Red" Moore
- Liner notes: Suzette Quintanilla, Nir Seroussi
- Concept: Gregg Vickers
- Reissue Producer: Guillermo J. Page

== Charts and certifications ==
=== Weekly charts ===
| Chart (1994) | Peak position |
|---|---|
| US Top Latin Albums (Billboard) | 2 |
| US Regional Mexican Albums (Billboard) | 1 |
| Chart (1995) | Peak position |
| US Billboard 200 (Billboard) | 79 |

=== Year-end charts ===
| Chart (1993) | Peak position |
|---|---|
| US Regional Mexican Albums (Billboard) | 3 |

=== All-time charts ===
All-time chart performance for Selena Live!
| Chart (1985–1994) | Position |
|---|---|
| US Regional Mexican Albums (Billboard) | 11 |

=== Certifications and sales ===
| Region | Certification | Certified units/sales |
|---|---|---|
| Mexico | — | 250,000 |
| United States (RIAA) | Gold | 1,000,000 |

== See also ==
- 1993 in Latin music
