= No Debes Jugar =

Single by Selena

from the album Selena Live!
- Released: April 29, 1993
- Recorded: 1993
- Studio: Q-Productions (Corpus Christi, TX)
- Genre: Tejano; Mexican cumbia
- Length: 3:49
- Label: EMI Latin
- Songwriters: Ricky Vela; A.B. Quintanilla III
- Producers: A.B. Quintanilla III; Bebu Silvetti

Selena singles chronology
"Amame" (1993)	"No Debes Jugar" (1993)	"La Llamada" (1993)

"No Debes Jugar" (English: "You Must Not Play Around") is a song recorded by American recording artist Selena and released as the lead single from her first live album Live! (1993). It was composed by Selena y Los Dinos keyboardist Ricky Vela and Selena's brother and principal record producer A.B. Quintanilla III and produced by Quintanilla III and Argentine music producer Bebu Silvetti. It is an uptempo Mexican cumbia song with influences of Rock en Español which is centered on female empowerment. Lyrically, the song describes a woman who threatens to leave her unappreciative boyfriend.

The song received generally positive reviews from music critics who praised its originality and mixing of music genres. It peaked at number 3 on the US Hot Latin Tracks on the week ending 14 August 1993. On the week ending 9 April 2011, "No Debes Jugar" entered the Regional Mexican Digital Songs chart. "No Debes Jugar" received a "Song of the Year" nomination from the 1994 Tejano Music Awards and the 1994 Lo Nuestro Awards. The song has been covered by Mexican American singer Jennifer Peña, Puerto Rican salsa singer La India, Mexican contestant Érika Alcocer Luna, and Mexican band Banda El Grullo.

== Background and composition ==
"No Debes Jugar" was written by Selena y Los Dinos keyboardist Ricky Vela and Selena's brother, principle record producer and songwriter A.B. Quintanilla III. It was produced by Quintanilla III and Argentine music producer Bebu Silvetti. The song was intended to be one of three studio tracks for Selena's Live! (1993) album. Vela had written most of the lyrics while touring with Los Dinos in the 1992-93 period. Quintanilla III later co-wrote the song after Vela finished the lyrics. Quintanilla III only made a few adjustments to the song and began adding music notes for pre-production. "No Debes Jugar" was recorded in Corpus Christi, Texas at Selena's father and manager Abraham Quintanilla, Jr.'s recording studio Q-Productions. After recording sessions were done, EMI Latin argued that the song should be the lead single from Live!. Before the album was released, the song was mixed by Brian "Red" Moore, a family friend.

"No Debes Jugar" is an uptempo Mexican cumbia song with influences of Rock en Español. Written in the key of E-flat major, the beat is set in common time and moves at a moderate 89 beats per minute. It centers the organ as its musical instrument foundation. Ramiro Burr of the Houston Chronicle stated that Selena blended Mexican polka rhythms with melodic, synth-driven pop hooks in "No Debes Jugar" and "La Llamada". Lyrically, the song describes a woman whose life is centered on being unappreciated by her boyfriend. She finally stands up for herself announcing that she is done playing around and threatens to leave. The central theme explored in the song suggests female empowerment.

== Critical reception and covers ==
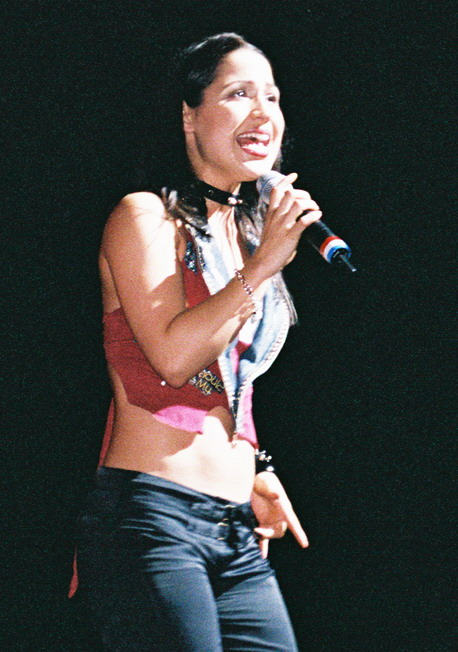
Jennifer Peña covered the song when she was 12 during a festival in Corpus Christi, Texas

Jim Beal Jr. of the San Antonio Express-News wrote that "No Debes Jugar" "outshines" the rest of the songs on Live! including the two other studio tracks. An editor from the Fort Worth Star-Telegram praised Selena's usage of different genres when recording "No Debes Jugar", which the editor believed helped the song to be distinguished when played on radio. Sally Jacobs of the Boston Globe noted the originality of "No Debes Jugar" as being Selena's trademark. Jacobs also believed that it is one of her cumbia signature songs and most popular cumbia song. "No Debes Jugar" received a "Song of the Year" nomination at the 1994 Tejano Music Awards, and "Regional Mexican Song of the Year" at the 1994 Lo Nuestro Awards Awards. It was among the "Top 10 Spanish Hits of 1993" according to the Orlando Sentinel. According to the Austin American-Statesman, "No Debes Jugar" was the best Tejano single of 1993.

Mexican American Latin pop artist Jennifer Peña covered "No Debes Jugar" when she was 12 at the Jim Wells County Fair in Corpus Christi, Texas. Puerto Rican salsa singer La India covered the song during the Selena ¡VIVE! concert. Michael Clark of the Houston Chronicle wrote that "India belted effortless notes that wafted to the rafters on "No Debes Jugar"". On the second season of La Academia, contestant Érika Alcocer Luna covered "No Debes Jugar". Mexican band Banda El Grullo recorded the song for their album 30 Numeros 1 en Banda.

== Track listing ==
- CD Single
1. "No Debes Jugar" — 3:49

== Credits and personnel ==
All credits were taken from the Live! album notes.

- Selena – vocals
- Ricky Vela – writer, keyboardist
- Joe Ojeda – keyboards
- Chris Pérez – guitar
- A.B. Quintanilla III – co-writer, producer, arranger
- Brian "Red" Moore – audio mixer
- Bebu Silvetti – producer

== Charts ==
=== Weekly charts ===
Chart (1993)	Peak position
US Billboard Hot Latin Tracks	3
Mexico Grupera Songs (El Siglo de Torreón)	5

Chart (2011)	Peak position
US Billboard Regional Mexican Digital Songs	13

=== Year-end charts ===
Chart (1993)	Peak position
US Billboard Hot Latin Tracks	13

== Certifications ==
Region	Certification	Certified units/sales
United States (RIAA)	Platinum (Latin)	60,000^{‡}
^{‡} Sales+streaming figures based on certification alone.

== Awards and nominations ==
Year	Awards ceremony	Award	Results
1994	Tejano Music Awards	Song of the Year	Nominated
1994	Lo Nuestro Awards	Song of the Year	Nominated

== Works cited ==
- Edward James Olmos (narrator), Jose Behar (executive producer), Abraham Quintanilla (executive producer), Claribel Cuevas (associate producer), Randal J. Edwards (associate producer), Ila von Hasperg (editor), Jeffrey Coulter (producer), Cecelia Miniucchi (director) (April 1, 1997). Selena Remembered (Documentary). Corpus Christi, Texas: EMI Latin Productions, Q-Productions.
