= La Llamada =

Single by Selena

from the album Selena Live!
- B-side: "¿Qué Creías?"
- Released: October 18, 1993
- Recorded: 1993
- Studio: Q-Productions (Corpus Christi, TX)
- Genre: Tejano; Mexican cumbia
- Length: 3:49
- Label: EMI Latin
- Songwriters: Pete Astudillo; A.B. Quintanilla III
- Producers: A.B. Quintanilla III; Bebu Silvetti

Selena singles chronology
"No Debes Jugar" (1993)	"La Llamada" (1993)	"Donde Quiera Que Estés" (1994)

Music video
- "La Llamada" on YouTube

"La Llamada" (English: "The Phone Call") is a song recorded by American recording artist Selena for her first live album Live! (1993). It was composed by Selena y Los Dinos backup singer Pete Astudillo and Selena's brother and principal record producer A.B. Quintanilla III and produced by Quintanilla III and Argentine music producer Bebu Silvetti. "La Llamada" was released as the second single from Live!. "La Llamada" is an uptempo Mexican cumbia song centering on female empowerment. Lyrically, the song sees Selena break up with her cheating boyfriend over the phone.

The song received generally positive reviews from music critics. It peaked at number 5 on the US Hot Latin Tracks on the week ending 23 October 1993. On the week ending 9 April 2011, "La Llamada" entered the Regional Mexican Digital Songs chart. A music video was released and features Selena dancing in a crowd at a beach house in Malibu, California. There have been many cover versions of "La Llamada" ranging from Mexican to Dominican artists.

== Background and composition ==
"La Llamada" was one of three studio tracks recorded for Live! (1993). It was written by Selena y Los Dinos backup singer Pete Astudillo and Selena's brother, principal record producer and songwriter A.B. Quintanilla III. It was produced by Quintanilla III and Argentine music producer Bebu Silvetti. The song was intended to be one of three studio tracks for Selena's Live! album. Astudillo and Quintanilla III had spent an hour writing a song together. They wanted to write a song on a topic that many women face with their boyfriends. Quintanilla III had wanted to empower women, letting them know that they should hold their heads up and remember that life goes on. Selena favored the lyrical content and central theme, a common one in her songs. "La Llamada" was recorded in Corpus Christi, Texas, at Selena's father and manager Abraham Quintanilla, Jr.'s recording studio Q-Productions. Before Live! was released, the song was mixed by Brian "Red" Moore, a family friend. Because Selena favored the song, the band released a music video. It was filmed in a beach house in Malibu, California. The video features Selena dancing with guys on one side and woman on the other. In other scenes, Selena is belting the lyrics behind blue curtains.

"La Llamada" is an uptempo Mexican cumbia song. Written in the key of A minor, the beat is set in common time and moves at a moderate 90 beats per minute. "La Llamada" describes a woman telling her boyfriend over the phone that she saw him kissing another girl, while her boyfriend tries to persuade to her that it was not him. The central theme explored on "La Llamada" suggests female empowerment.

== Critical reception and covers ==
Howard Blumenthal wrote in his book The World Music CD Listener's Guide that "La Llamada" is an "energetic" song. An editor from the Fort Worth Star-Telegram compared "La Llamada" and another Live! single "No Debes Jugar". The editor expressed the similarities the songs shared in both its lyrical content and the instruments used in the songs. Sue Anne Pressley of the Chicago Sun-Times believed that "La Llamada" is a "fan favorite", calling it "a danceable pop number". A Philadelphia Daily News editor called "La Llamada" a "catchy tune", though commented that it is the least memorable song on Live!.

Mexican band Banda El Grullo recorded the song on their tribute album Lo Mejor De Selena Con Banda. Mexican singer Dalila also recorded the song for her album Dalila en Vivo. Dominican bachata singer Kiko Rodriguez recorded the song on his album Otra Vez Con Amor.

== Charts ==
Chart (1993)	Peak position
US Billboard Hot Latin Tracks	5
Mexico Grupera Songs (El Siglo de Torreón)	15
Chart (2011)	Peak position
US Billboard Regional Mexican Digital Songs	10

== Certifications ==
Region	Certification	Certified units/sales
United States (RIAA)	Platinum (Latin)	60,000^{‡}
^{‡} Sales+streaming figures based on certification alone.

== Personnel ==
All credits were taken from the Live! album notes.

- Selena – vocals
- Ricky Vela – keyboardist
- Joe Ojeda – keyboards
- Chris Pérez – guitar
- Pete Astudillo - writer
- A.B. Quintanilla III – co-writer, producer, arranger
- Brian "Red" Moore – audio mixer
- Bebu Silvetti – producer
