= Trial of Yolanda Saldívar =

1995 murder trial in Texas

State of Texas v. Yolanda Saldívar
- Court: 228th District Court
- Decided: October 23, 1995
- Verdict: Guilty
- Charge: Murder

Case history
- Subsequent actions: Unknown number of appeals by the defendant and two appeals by the defense team were subsequently denied

Outcome
- Saldívar sentenced to life in prison with the possibility of parole.

Court membership
- Judge sitting: Mike Westergren

Keywords
- Embezzlement; Murder; Sexual assault

State of Texas v. Yolanda Saldívar was a criminal trial held at the Harris County Criminal Courthouse in Downtown Houston, in the U.S. state of Texas. The trial began with the jury's swearing-in on October 9, 1995, through opening statements on October 12, to a verdict on October 23. Former nurse Yolanda Saldívar was tried on one count of first-degree murder after the shooting death of American Tejano music singer Selena Quintanilla-Pérez on March 31, 1995, after which she held police and the FBI Crisis Negotiation Unit at bay for almost ten hours. The case has been described as the most important trial for the Hispanic population and was compared to the O. J. Simpson murder trial by media outlets. It was one of the most publicly followed trials in the history of the state of Texas.

On April 3, Saldívar was arraigned and pleaded not guilty, saying that the shooting was accidental and that she had intended to commit suicide. Judge Mike Westergren, who presided over the case, appointed high-profile defense attorney Douglas Tinker and his team to appear for Saldívar. The public criticized prosecutor Carlos Valdez as an inexperienced criminal lawyer. The prosecution argued against the motion of change of venue from Corpus Christi, Texas, to Houston, while the defense believed that Selena's high-profile status in her hometown might result in a biased jury.

The prosecution team called between forty-five and fifty witnesses including Selena's father and manager of her music career Abraham Quintanilla Jr., Selena's widower Chris Pérez, employees at Selena Etc. and at the Days Inn motel where the shooting occurred, a paramedic, several gun experts, the owners of the gun shop where Saldívar purchased the gun, emergency personnel, and Lloyd White, who performed the autopsy. The defense team called fewer witnesses, which included Saldívar's parents, former co-workers, motel staff at the Days Inn, Selena's former seventh-grade teacher, and the lead murder investigator. The evidence used in the trial included the gun used to kill Selena, the outfit Saldívar wore the day she claimed she was sexually assaulted, and the recorded conversations between FBI negotiators Larry Young and Issac Valencia, and Saldívar.

The jury convicted Saldívar of murder after a two-hour deliberation, and she was sentenced to a maximum of life imprisonment with eligibility for parole in March 2025. Fans outside the courtroom cheered the verdict. Many were seen expressing their delight at the outcome to Saldívar's parents and some wore T-shirts degrading to their daughter. There were more than two hundred accredited media representatives at the courthouse. The trial generated interest in Spain, the Philippines, Europe, South America, Australia and Japan. Tinker announced an appeal but it was denied by Westergren both in 1998 and 1999. Valdez published a book about the trial entitled: Justice for Selena: The State vs. Yolanda Saldívar in 2004. As of December 2014, Saldívar was representing herself in an attempt to be released from prison, claiming that some witnesses were not called during the trial, and that evidence went missing following the trial. Saldivar's parole petition filed in January 2025 was denied on March 27, 2025, with March 2030 set as the next date set for her parole review.

== Background ==
=== Yolanda Saldivar ===
Saldívar, an in-home nurse for terminal cancer patients, was a fan of country music. However, she did enjoy Shelly Lares, a Tejano music artist, and disliked Selena for dominating award categories Saldívar's favorite musician was nominated in. In 1992, her niece persuaded her to go to a Selena concert in her hometown of San Antonio, Texas. Saldívar became a fan and decided to form a fan club promoting Selena. She contacted the singer's father and manager Abraham Quintanilla, Jr. seeking permission to start one.

After a meeting with Quintanilla, Jr., he agreed to Saldívar's request, and she became the founder, and acting president, of the Selena fan club. In January 1994, Selena opened two boutiques in Texas, one in Corpus Christi, the other in San Antonio. Because of her touring schedule, she was unable to run the businesses and decided to appoint Saldívar as manager, since Quintanilla, Jr. believed she was the perfect choice, having successfully filled the role as president of the fan club for three years.

The singer began receiving complaints from employees, her fashion designer, and her cousin about Saldívar's management skills. They claimed that Saldívar mismanaged Selena's affairs, manipulated their decisions, destroyed their creations, intimidated and threatened them, and secretly recorded them without their consent or knowledge. Selena did not believe Saldívar, now a close friend, would impose on her fashion business. Quintanilla, Jr. began receiving complaints after the initial attempts to have Saldívar fired from her job failed. He tried convincing Selena that Saldívar might be a bad influence on her. She brushed aside the comments since her father always mistrusted people.

In January 1995, Quintanilla, Jr. began receiving letters and phone calls from angry fans who had sent their enrollment fees for the fan club and received nothing. He began an investigation and found that Saldívar had used forged checks to embezzle $30,000 ($64,665 in 2025) from both the fan club and the boutiques. On March 9, 1995, the Quintanilla family held a meeting to discuss the disappearing funds. Saldívar's answers to Quintanilla, Jr.'s questions were not convincing, and he informed her that if she could not disprove his accusations that he would get the police involved.

=== Selena's murder ===
The day after being confronted by the Quintanilla family, Saldívar was banned from contacting Selena. Saldívar purchased a .38 Caliber Special revolver but lied to the clerk about her intentions claiming she was a nurse whose patients' relatives had threatened her life. Saldívar convinced Selena to meet her alone at her Days Inn motel room on March 31, 1995. In the motel room, Selena demanded financial papers required for tax preparation. Saldívar delayed handing over the papers claiming that she had been raped during a recent Mexico trip. Selena drove Saldívar to Doctors Regional Hospital but doctors only did a routine exam, not confirming if a rape had occurred.

When they returned to the motel room, Selena emptied Saldívar's satchel which was filled with documents relating to the boutiques and fan club as well as the .38 revolver. Saldívar grabbed the gun and pointed it at Selena. As Selena attempted to flee, Saldívar shot her in the back, severing an artery. Critically wounded, Selena ran to the motel's lobby and collapsed on the floor, naming Saldívar as her assailant, and giving the room number where she had been shot. Her condition began to deteriorate rapidly as motel staff attended to her. Selena was pronounced dead at 1:05 p.m. from loss of blood and cardiac arrest.

=== Saldívar's arrest ===
After the shooting, Saldívar got into her pickup truck and attempted to leave the motel. Rosario Garza, a motel staff member, saw Saldívar leave her room with a wrapped towel. It was later thought that she had been on her way to Q-Productions to shoot Quintanilla, Jr., and others waiting for Selena to arrive for a planned recording session. However, she was spotted by a responding police officer. An officer emerged from the cruiser, drew his gun, and ordered Saldívar to get out of the truck. Saldívar did not comply. Instead, she backed up and parked adjacent to two cars; her truck was then blocked by the police cruiser. Saldívar picked up the pistol, pointed it at her right temple, and threatened to commit suicide. A SWAT team, and the FBI Crisis Negotiation Unit, were brought in. Musicologist Himilce Novas commented that the event was reminiscent of O. J. Simpson's threatened suicide ten months earlier.

Larry Young and Isaac Valencia began negotiating with Saldívar. They ran a phone line to their base of operations, adjacent to Saldívar's pickup truck, as the standoff continued. Motel guests were ordered to remain in their rooms until police could escort them out. Saldívar surrendered after nearly nine-and-a-half hours. By that time, hundreds of fans had gathered at the scene; many wept as police took Saldívar away. Within hours of Selena's murder, a press conference was held. Assistant Police Chief Ken Bung and Quintanilla, Jr., informed the press that a possible motive was that Selena had gone to the Days Inn motel to terminate "her" employment; Saldívar was still not identified by name in media reports. Rudy Treviño, director of the Texas Talent Music Association, and sponsor of the Tejano Music Awards, declared that March 31, 1995, would be known as "Black Friday".

== Trial ==
=== Pre-trial ===
On April 3, Saldívar was arraigned and pleaded not guilty to Selena's murder. Her bail was set at $100,000 though it was raised to $500,000 at the behest of district attorney Carlos Valdez who considered Saldívar to be a flight risk. When bail was announced, people asked why the death penalty had not been sought. The Nueces County jail was deluged with death threats and there were public calls for vigilante justice. Some gang members in Texas were reported to have taken up collections to raise the bond for Saldívar so they could kill her when she was released.

Veteran CCPD detective Paul Rivera led the murder investigation. Originally, an unnamed man was hired to defend Saldívar but withdrew from the case on April 4 fearing community retaliation, and concerned about his children's reaction when they learned he was defending Saldívar whom they disliked. Judge Mike Westergren began searching for a defense attorney. Prosecutor Carlos Valdez was designated lead prosecutor, while Mark Skurka was appointed his legal counsel. On April 6, a grand jury was called to determine whether to indict Saldívar for murder. After about an hour, the jury had returned a true bill and the indictment was randomly assigned to the 214th District Court. Carlos Valdez believed that a speedy trial with Westergren presiding over the case was probable.

Douglas Tinker, a 30-year veteran attorney, was assigned to defend Saldívar. Tinker was called one of the best criminal defense lawyers in the state of Texas, and was estimated by Richard Haynes, also a Texas criminal defense attorney, to be worth $50 million. His wife, fearful that they would suffer from community retribution, asked Tinker not to take the case. Arnold Garcia, a former district prosecutor, was chosen by Tinker as his co-counsel. The judge honored Tinker's request for a private investigator. The court date was originally set for August 17, but, for unknown reasons, was pushed back two months to October 9. On May 18, Tinker and Valdez argued about the possibility of reducing Saldívar's bond to $10,000.

Tinker argued that she should not be in prison since she had not yet been found guilty of murder and deserved to be out on bail. Valdez argued that Saldívar was a flight risk, with contacts in Mexico, and, were she to be released from prison, it was unlikely she would be seen again. Saldívar's parents, siblings, and former co-workers argued that she had no financial resources to make bond, and that she was incapable of the actions of which she was accused. Valdez called Rivera to the stand. He claimed that Saldívar had developed several foreign contacts as a result of working for Selena. Rivera also brought up the ongoing investigation of the embezzlement claims, stating that Saldívar might have access to funds that the investigation had not yet uncovered. Westergren denied the bond reduction, and Saldívar was returned to jail.

After the May 18 ruling, Westergren decided to move the case to Houston, Texas. His decision was based upon the demographics of predominantly Hispanic Nueces County, citing a preponderance of people who viewed Selena as a "well known and beloved member of the Hispanic population." During the time of trial, Houston was predominately White. On August 4, the pretrial hearing began as Tinker filed three motions; a change of venue to Houston (which was pre-approved), a motion to suppress or exclude Saldívar's written statement, and a motion to suppress or exclude Saldívar's oral statements made at the time of her arrest. Tinker presented twelve witnesses: a former district judge, a former district attorney, a former first assistant district attorney, several private lawyers, and members of the media.

They all expressed concern that Saldívar could not have an impartial jury because of the overwhelming media coverage. A Spanish-language radio personality informed the judge that the general consensus among Hispanics in the area was that Saldívar was guilty and that she would be acquitted because of the "faulty" juridical system, and Valdez's lack of experience. The judge recessed the hearing and Valdez scrambled to find witnesses who believed that an unbiased jury could be selected were the trial to be held in Corpus Christi. The hearing resumed on August 7, and Valdez presented five witnesses who believed that Saldívar could have a fair trial despite the media coverage. The following day, Westergren granted the motion to change the venue to Houston, Texas.

=== Trial in Houston ===
==== First week ====
The jury was empaneled on October 9. The jury included seven white Americans, four Hispanics, and one African American. Westergren ordered that the trial would neither be televised nor taped and limited the number of reporters in the courtroom to avoid a "repeat of the Simpson circus". The trial began on October 11. In his opening statement, Valdez claimed that Saldívar "deliberately killed Selena", calling the act "senseless and cowardly" because Selena had been shot in the back. Valdez called the incident a "simple case of murder".

Tinker opened his statement as though he were "describing a mystery movie" calling Quintanilla, Jr. a "controlling and dominating father, ambitious for power and money." His removal of Selena from school to sing in nightclubs and bars served "the sole purpose of making money." He infringed on his family's privacy by demanding that they live in a compound so that he could watch their every move. Tinker asserted that Selena wanted to be independent and "break from her father's control" by operating her own business. According to Tinker, after Saldívar fired the gun, she "ran after her friend to help her" by getting her into her pickup truck. He claimed that Quintanilla, Jr. called Saldívar a "lesbian obsessed" with Selena. Tinker ended his opening statement saying that Quintanilla, Jr. drove Saldívar "to near madness" by threatening to destroy her friendship with Selena.

The prosecutor's first witness was Quintanilla, Jr. Valdez asked if he had had sexual relations with, or raped, Saldívar. He also asked him if he ever called Saldívar a lesbian. Quintanilla, Jr. said "no." Valdez then asked him about the alleged theft. Quintanilla, Jr. told the court that Saldívar was a thief. Valdez then called Chris Pérez, Selena's widower, who testified that he and Selena had stopped trusting Saldívar long before the crime was committed. Kyle Voss and Mike McDonald from A Place to Shoot, the store where Saldívar had purchased the gun, testified that they had instructed her on the proper use of the gun. They also said that she had returned the gun two days after originally purchasing it claiming that her father had given her a pistol. She returned eleven days later to repurchase the gun.

On October 12, Valdez called Trinidad Espinoza to the stand. He testified that he saw Saldívar pointing a gun while running after Selena. Saldívar then stopped, lowered the gun, and walked back into her motel room displaying no emotion. After hearing this testimony, Marcella Quintanilla (Selena's mother) experienced chest and arm pains and was hospitalized to treat a sudden rise in her blood pressure. Motel maid Norma Marie Martinez also described the same events as Espinoza, but added that Saldívar had called Selena a "bitch". Tinker asked Martinez to indicate where she had been on a diagram of the scene of the crime. He believed that Martinez could not have seen or heard anything because she was a considerable distance from the vicinity of the shooting.

Emergency room personnel, who attended to Saldívar when Selena drove her to the hospital to be checked for rape, claimed that Saldívar had lied to Selena about the rape as there were inconsistencies between the story she told them and the one she told Selena. Tinker asked the nurse to describe Saldívar's mood at that time; she replied that Saldívar showed symptoms of depression. Tinker asked if those symptoms were typically found in a victim of sexual assault. The nurse agreed they were. Another nurse who attended to Saldívar stated that she had red welts on her neck and arms, but that they did not resemble the bruises a person would receive from an assault by a baseball bat as Saldívar claimed.

The prosecutor showed the jury the outfit Saldívar had worn during her alleged rape. He claimed that someone had purposefully torn holes and shredded the shirt with scissors. On October 13, Rosalinda Gonzalez, the assistant manager of the Days Inn, was called to testify. She told the jury that when Selena arrived in the lobby after being shot, she had asked the singer who shot her. Selena cried out "the girl in room 158". Ruben DeLeon, the motel's salesman, said that Selena told him "Yolanda, Yolanda Saldívar shot me. The one in room 158." Receptionist Shawna Vela testified that she had heard the same statements but added that Selena had screamed: "lock the door, she'll shoot me again" before collapsing. Vela told the jury that there was so much blood that she felt nauseous before calling 911. The last person to be called to testify was paramedic Richard Fredrickson who described, in detail, Selena's condition and a mysterious ring she clutched in her hands. The Quintanilla family were seen sobbing as Fredrickson detailed his attempts to save Selena's life, while Saldívar "stared blankly".

==== Second week ====
The trial resumed on Monday, October 16 with the playing of the recorded negotiations between the FBI Crisis Negotiation Unit and Saldívar. The tape began with Saldívar stating how badly she wanted to die. During the conversation, the jury heard Larry Young try to persuade her to lower her gun; Saldívar said that she could not do so. Young told her that by committing suicide she would only harm her parents. Saldívar then asked to contact her mother to say goodbye and ask for forgiveness. She continued repeating, "I just wanna die" as Young began talking about religion to determine if she believed in a faith that might cause her to reconsider suicide.

Young told Saldívar that if she would give herself up, he would place a jacket over her so that the media would not have a picture of her face during her surrender. Isaac Valencia told Saldívar that if she were to surrender they promised to turn off all of the lights that were pointing towards her truck; she agreed. As she left her truck, she was scared by the dozens of armed police and FBI agents who were pointing rifles and pistols at her. She ran back to her truck, pointed the gun at her head, and screamed at Young: "They're carrying guns! They're carrying guns! They're going to kill me! They're going to kill me!" Newswoman María Celeste Arrarás wrote in her 1997 investigative book that she found it "curious" that a person who cried for hours that she wanted to die "would be afraid that someone might make her wish come true." The New York Times also commented that "she alternately begged to be killed and expressed fear that she would be killed if she left the truck."

As the taped conversation continued, the jury heard Saldívar's reaction to the news of Selena's death after her phone picked up a local radio station's signal. In an angry voice, Saldívar asked Young why he had kept the singer's condition from her, since she wanted to visit Selena at the hospital, believing she was still alive. Young told Saldívar not to believe the radio announcement, and that he did not know about Selena's current condition. The conversation then switched to Saldívar blaming Quintanilla, Jr. for the murder, claiming that he threatened to kill her. She explained to Young that she bought the gun for protection after finding her car tires deliberately slashed. She also told him how Quintanilla, Jr. sexually abused her by "sticking a knife" in her vagina, threatening to murder her if she went to the police. When asked about what happened in her motel room, Saldívar exclaimed: "I bought this gun to kill myself, not her, and she told me, 'Yolanda, I don't want you to kill yourself.' And we were talking about that when I took it out and pointed it to my head, and when I pointed it to my head, she opened the door. I said 'Selena, close that door,' and when I did that gun went off."

The prosecution then told the jury that comments by some officers had planted the idea in Saldívar's head that the shooting was accidental. The defense countered stating that although she did not use the word "accident", she did not mean to harm Selena. John Houston, a police officer who was present during the standoff, was asked during the nine and a half hours that Saldívar held the gun to her head, how many times it "went off"; he said "none". The trial resumed on October 18. Robert Garza, a Texas Ranger, told the jury that during the preliminary hearings in Corpus Christi, he witnessed Saldívar making gestures indicating that the shooting had been accidental, though she had not indicated this in her confession.

The defense called Rivera to the stand and explained to the jury that Rivera had a conflict of interest after finding out that he had a poster of Selena hanging on his wall and was treated to a Selena T-shirt by Quintanilla, Jr. Tinker explained to the jury that the confession was signed by an exhausted, sleep deprived Saldívar after eleven hours of questioning and being denied water, food, and use of a bathroom. Tinker asked Rivera why he destroyed his notes, and why he had not recorded his interrogation of Saldívar, had not provided her with a lawyer as the law requires, and had not allowed her to see her relatives after signing her confession. A few days later, the Mexican Mafia sent Tinker a signed postcard declaring their intention to harm him and his family for defending Saldívar.

On October 19, the defense called the two surgeons who tried to revive Selena at the hospital. The defense questioned why Quintanilla, Jr. would request that a blood transfusion not be performed on Selena due to his religious beliefs, when by law, Pérez would have the final say whether or not the procedure would be performed. The autopsy pictures of Selena were displayed for everyone to see. The white American jury member was affected by the pictures, and was seen "bursting into tears" as Lloyd White described his findings in detail. According to Arrarás, Saldívar was seen as "impassive" (expressionless) and had "lowered her head" when the autopsy pictures were shown.

After confirming that Selena was not pregnant, contradicting rumors in media reports, White announced his conclusion: "this was a homicide, not an accident." The prosecution called on a firearms expert who found the gun to be in working condition and stating that a person pulling the trigger must use a "great amount of pressure". Valdez showed pictures of the motel room where Selena had been shot, claiming, "It was impossible for [Saldívar] not know her friend had been wounded," and "this meant that she had not come to [Selena's] aid because she chose not to."

The defense arguments began on October 20 with Barbra Schultz, the hotel's general manager, taking the stand. Tinker asked if Selena had actually screamed out to them to lock the doors. She replied that Selena had never asked for the doors to be locked and was only moaning on the floor. Schultz further stated that her former employee, Vela, was not trustworthy. Schultz also said that all the employees began formulating different opinions on what happened on March 31 when the prosecution called on them to testify. Staff maid Gloria Magaña doubted the validity of Espinoza and Martinez's accounts. She told the jury that it was impossible for both employees to have seen Saldívar chasing Selena because their work was on the other side of the motel building.

Magaña claimed to have seen Selena running through the parking lot, but did not see Saldívar chasing after her. Tinker called Marilyn Greer, Selena's seventh grade teacher, to the stand. She told the jury that Selena had had the ability to graduate with honors and could have easily obtained a college scholarship. Greer then spoke about how Quintanilla, Jr. had taken away the possibility of college for Selena, wasting her youth by forcing her to sing at nightclubs and bars for money, something that was unhealthy for a thirteen-year-old girl.

==== Third week ====
On October 23, the defense presented their closing arguments, claiming that the shooting was an accident and that Rivera was "not interested in pursuing justice. He wanted to make a case." They also argued that Rivera knew hours beforehand that the Saldívar case was "a big case" and had "wanted to be the one to get [her]." The defense claimed that Selena still referred to Saldívar as her "dearest friend" pointing out that the singer took her to the hospital, despite having a recording session scheduled that day. They reminded the jury that an employee demonstrated that the gun can "fire off" with "just one's little finger." The defense accused the prosecution of manipulating the jury's emotions by displaying photographs of Selena at the morgue, and the trail of blood from the motel room to the lobby. They concluded by telling the jury to not side with a "rabid father".

In the prosecution's closing statement, Skurka told the jury that Selena "had been reduced to a mere picture thanks to the March 31 actions of the defendant." Skurka asked the jury why Saldívar, a nurse, did not administer first aid and why had she had not called 911 after "accidentally" shooting the singer in the back. Skurka then provided details of the three different stories Saldívar used to explain the purchase of the gun, as well as the different stories about her alleged rape. The prosecutor pointed out that if Saldívar had wanted to commit suicide she had ample time to do so. Valdez took out a calendar for the month of March 1995 and chronologically pointed out the events preceding the killing of Selena. According to Valdez, Saldívar hated Quintanilla, Jr. and believed that she got revenge by killing his daughter, "someone he loved the most."

== Verdict and reactions ==
Saldívar's crime was punishable by either a life sentence with parole eligibility in 30 years, or a term of up to 99 years in prison and a $10,000 fine. Saldívar was kept at Nueces County jail under a suicide watch before her trial. After closing arguments, the jury deliberated for two hours and twenty-three minutes. As people were waiting for the verdict, prosecutors and the defense team signed autographs for the media as did Saldívar. Saldívar's family also signed autographs, while Quintanilla, Jr. remained in his seat awaiting the verdict. The jury found Saldívar guilty of murder. She received the maximum sentence of life in prison with parole eligibility in 30 years.

Before the verdict was read, some in the crowd and Quintanilla, Jr. were skeptical of the outcome of the trial after O. J. Simpson's acquittal a week earlier. Saldívar told her defense team that she wanted to kill herself after the verdict was read. The Hispanic population cheered as Westergren delivered the verdict and Saldívar's sentence. Celebrations and festivals were planned throughout the states of Texas and California and in some areas in Mexico. Fans outside the courtroom began playing Selena's music and cheered for hours. Some fans were seen cheering in Saldívar's face as police officers drove her off to prison.

Other fans prayed and cried out that "Justice had been served!" Traffic in Texas was reportedly at a standstill as people took to the streets and highways in cheering the verdict. Saldívar's parents were greeted by fans wearing T-shirts degrading her and screams from fans who told them "now let's kill the murderer!" and "hang the witch". The verdict was front-page news in dozens of newspapers across the United States.

== Media coverage and aftermath ==
Arrarás referred to this case as the "O. J. Simpson trial for Hispanics." It was the most watched trial in years in the state of Texas. The Brownsville Herald called the case: "the biggest courthouse media event to hit Houston." According to Texas Monthly, there were more than two-hundred media personnel stationed at the courthouse. Univision and Telemundo aired approximately ninety minutes' worth of coverage daily. Arrarás was called "the trial's undisputed media star" for her coverage of the trial and her Primer Impacto program had the "most knowledgeable courtroom analyst" in former state district judge Jorge Rangel, who provided his expertise on the law. During the playing of the recorded conversation between Saldívar and Young in the courtroom, Saldívar called out "Where's Larry?", a mantra that was put on T-shirts sold to the crowds.

The Chicago Tribune noted the difference in interest in the Selena murder trial between Hispanics and white Americans. Donna Dickerson, a white American magazine publisher, told the Chicago Tribune that she had no interest in the trial because of Selena's "Hispanic background" and noted that Mexican Americans did not show the same interest as whites when Elvis Presley was found dead. The Selena murder trial was called the "trial of the century" and the most important trial to the Hispanic population. The trial generated interest in Spain, the Philippines, Europe, South America, Australia and Japan.

Tinker announced an appeal before signing autographs for the cheering crowds. On December 22, the Houston Chronicle reported that Saldívar's lawyers were seeking a retrial, citing the prosecution's failure to notify them that a key witness had once been convicted of theft. Maria Norma Martinez, a motel maid, was said to be the only one to have seen the shooting. She claimed to have heard Saldívar call Selena a bitch. The prosecution had used the remark to discredit the defense's claim that the shooting was accidental. Westergren denied the request and called the prosecutors' action "somewhat problematic," but decided an appeals court should decide on a retrial." Both requests for an appeal were denied on October 3, 1998 and on August 19, 1999. On November 22, 1995, Saldívar arrived at the Gatesville Unit (now the Christina Crain Unit) in Gatesville, Texas, for processing.

Saldívar is currently serving her sentence at the Patrick O'Daniel Unit (formerly Mountain View Unit) in Gatesville, operated by the Texas Department of Criminal Justice. She will be eligible for parole on March 30, 2030. Because of multiple death threats from incarcerated Selena fans, Saldívar was placed in isolation and spends twenty-three hours a day alone in her 9 by 6 feet (2.7 by 1.8 m) cell, away from other inmates who may want to do her harm. Saldívar has asked the Texas Court of Criminal Appeals to accept a petition that challenges her conviction. She claims the petition was filed in 2000 with the 214th District Court, but was never sent to the higher court. Her request was received on March 31, 2008, the thirteenth anniversary of Selena's death.

Tinker and Garcia told a Texas Monthly magazine editor that losing the trial lessens their chances of getting shot by a fan. Hispanics in Texas had an increased level of trust in the state's judicial system after the verdict was read. The League of United Latin American Citizens began a campaign that encouraged Hispanics to respond to jury duty requests. E! dramatized the trial as part of an episode of E! True Hollywood Story in December 1996. People magazine called it "too cheap-looking to have any dramatic impact," but found the actor playing Tinker "interesting".

By virtue of a judge's order, the gun used to kill Selena was destroyed in 2002, and the pieces thrown into Corpus Christi Bay. Fans and historians did not approve of the decision, claiming that the event was historical and that the gun should have been placed in a museum. In 1997, Arrarás published her book Selena's Secret, which included interviews with Saldívar recounting the singer's "real life" and her side of the events of March 31. The book met with negative reviews from fans as well as Quintanilla, Jr. who claimed Arrarás sympathized with the convicted killer. Valdez also published a book on the trial, Justice for Selena: The State vs. Yolanda Saldivar, in 2004.

In December 2014, the San Antonio Express-News reported that Saldívar was "mounting a new legal effort to get an early release from prison, following numerous appeals in her case." The news of Saldívar's potential early release by a fake news agency which reported that Saldívar could be released as early as January 1, 2015 sparked a social media frenzy among fans. Valdez told the San Antonio Express-News that Saldívar is currently representing herself and that a court date has not yet been set. Saldívar claims that witnesses were not called on and files have gone missing since the end of the trial. Quintanilla, Jr. said that he "doesn't care" if Saldívar gets an early release, since "nothing is going to bring [his] daughter back." He also said that Saldívar would be safer in prison rather than being freed.

== See also ==
- O. J. Simpson murder case
- 1995 Okinawa rape incident
- History of Texas
- Timeline of Houston
- 1995 in the United States
