= Selena (film) =

1997 film by Gregory Nava

- Theatrical release poster
- Directed by: Gregory Nava
- Written by: Gregory Nava
- Produced by: Moctesuma Esparza; Robert Katz
- Starring: Jennifer Lopez; Edward James Olmos; Jon Seda; Constance Marie; Jacob Vargas; Lupe Ontiveros; Jackie Guerra
- Cinematography: Edward Lachman
- Edited by: Nancy Richardson
- Music by: Dave Grusin
- Production company: Q-Productions
- Distributed by: Warner Bros.
- Release date: March 21, 1997
- Running time: 127 minutes
- Country: United States
- Languages: English; Spanish
- Budget: $20 million
- Box office: $35.8 million (United States)

Selena is a 1997 American biographical musical drama film about Tejano music star Selena Quintanilla-Pérez, played by Jennifer Lopez. The film, written and directed by Gregory Nava, chronicles the star's rise to fame and death when she was murdered by Yolanda Saldívar at the age of 23. In addition to Lopez, the film also stars Edward James Olmos, Jon Seda, Constance Marie, Jacob Vargas, Lupe Ontiveros, and Jackie Guerra in her film debut.

Selena was released in the United States on March 21, 1997, by Warner Bros. Pictures. The film received positive reviews from critics and grossed $35 million worldwide against a production budget of $20 million. For her performance, Jennifer Lopez received a Best Actress nomination at the 55th Golden Globes.

In 2021, it was selected for preservation in the United States National Film Registry by the Library of Congress as being "culturally, historically, or aesthetically significant", and was re-released in select cinemas on April 7, 2022, to coincide with the film's 25th anniversary.

In 2024, the Pérez Art Museum Miami organized a screening of Selena as part of the institution's Floating Films with Ballyhoo Media. During this event, the film was screened from the water.

== Plot ==
The film opens backstage at the Astrodome in Houston, Texas, on February 26, 1995, right before Tejano superstar Selena plays to a sold-out crowd.

In 1961, during the Civil rights movement, a young Abraham Quintanilla and his doo-wop group “The Dinos" are unable to find success. A restaurant owner in Texas cancels their gig when he discovers they are not white. They perform for a Mexican-American nightclub, but a violent riot ensues when they perform American pop rather than the audience's preferred Tejano music.

Twenty years later, Abraham is living in Lake Jackson, Texas with his wife Marcella and their three children: son A.B., and daughters Suzette and Selena. Discovering Selena's singing talent, Abraham creates the band "Selena y Los Dinos" with Selena as lead singer, A.B. on bass, and Suzette on drums. Though initially reluctant, the children come to enjoy making music. Moving to Corpus Christi, Texas, the band goes on the road to support the family. After lackluster reception at a carnival, Selena begins adding more dance and personality into her act. The band's success grows following local performances. In 1989, Selena reveals her bustier during a carnival performance, angering Abraham due to its sexually suggestive nature.

In 1990, Chris Pérez auditions as the guitarist. Abraham disapproves of his heavy metal style but hires him after he agrees to cut his hair. Selena and Chris eventually fall in love. In 1992, when Chris' former band members trash a hotel suite, Abraham threatens to fire him. A.B. implores Abraham to reconsider, as Chris is needed for their upcoming tour in Mexico. Promoters worry when they realize Selena does not speak Spanish well, but her personality and care for her fans win everyone over. A show almost goes awry when the stage bustles after a massive crowd rush, but Selena calms them down with a joyous performance and is accepted as an "artist for the people" in Mexico.

After catching Selena and Chris embracing on the tour bus, Abraham fires Chris, threatening to disband the group if a heartbroken Selena follows him. Eventually, Selena asks Chris to marry her, insisting that Abraham will never willingly accept their relationship, and they elope. After a radio station announces their marriage, Abraham tells Selena he is proud of her maturity, having realized he was too harsh on them. The Quintanillas congratulate them, accept Chris into their family, and rehire him as the group's guitarist.

In 1994, music executives attend a Selena concert and offer her the chance to record an English-language album, showing that she has successfully broken down cultural barriers. Selena opens her first Selena Etc. boutique and asks her fan club president Yolanda Saldívar to manage it. Her live album wins a Grammy for Best Mexican American Album. Yolanda has the rest of the staff give her money to purchase a celebratory gift and gives Selena a ring resembling a Fabergé egg, but does not mention it was a group present. Selena begins recording her crossover album as she and Chris plan to start a family together.

Selena's fans become upset when they receive none of the exclusive benefits they were promised after paying to join the fan club. Other funds that Yolanda has been handling cannot be accounted for, and vital business records are missing. Upon being confronted, Yolanda denies any criminal activity and promises to locate the missing documents. On March 31, 1995, Selena is fatally shot by Yolanda, who then ends up in a standoff into the night with police and negotiation units. The Quintanilla-Pérez family mourns Selena's death, while a candlelight vigil is held by her fans.

== Cast ==
- Jennifer Lopez as Selena Quintanilla-Pérez (teenage and adult versions)
  - Becky Lee Meza as young Selena
  - Jennifer Peña as young Selena (singing voice)
- Edward James Olmos as Abraham Quintanilla Jr.
  - Panchito Gómez as young Abraham
- Constance Marie as Marcella Samora-Quintanilla
- Jon Seda as Chris Pérez
- Lupe Ontiveros as Yolanda Saldívar
- Jackie Guerra as Suzette Quintanilla
  - Victoria Elena Flores as young Suzette
- Jacob Vargas as A.B. Quintanilla III
  - Rafael Tamayo as young A.B.
- Alex Meneses as Sara
- John Verea as José Behar
- Ruben Gonzalez as Joe Ojeda
- Seidy López as Debra
- Pete Astudillo as himself, Dinos 1990s
- Ricky Vela as himself, Dinos 1990s
- Don Shelton as himself, Dinos 1990s
- Janice Cruz, Lopez's body double (uncredited)

== Production ==
=== Development ===
On March 31, 1995, Selena was shot and killed by Yolanda Saldívar, a former friend who had managed the singer's Selena Etc. boutiques. Response by the Hispanic community was comparable to the reaction of the assassinations of John Lennon and John F. Kennedy, or the death of Elvis Presley. Newsstands were swarmed by people looking for items concerning Selena. Shortly thereafter, several media projects were in production, including eight unauthorized biographies, six documentaries and two Quintanilla family-unapproved biographical films. This led Abraham to begin working on an authorized biographical material within weeks of her death, a process he found difficult since the family was still mourning.

He believed the film would "put an end to all the false rumors" that were circulating through the media at the time and "silence [the media] from telling the wrong story." He wanted "the whole world to know the [true] story about [Selena]." A.B. spoke out about the family's concern about possible "misinterpretation of [Selena], [their] family, and a culture" by outside sources, and their belief that it was imperative to release their own official film. A.B. claimed the decision was foisted upon them after learning about the unauthorized biographies and films that could have potentially misconstrued Selena's story. At the time of Abraham's decision, there were "gossip and hurtful crazy things that were coming from the press" about the family's plan on a film. Abraham wanted the film to immortalize Selena "in a true positive and beautiful way [and wanted] to celebrate her life [and to] quiet and put to rest all [the] negative ugliness [the media had portrayed]."

News of Abraham's desire to release an official authorized film reached Hollywood, and American film producer, Moctesuma Esparza. Esparza immediately approached Abraham at his Corpus Christi office about partnering to produce the film. He educated Abraham about the filmmaking process and the support system he could provide while giving Abraham authoritative control over casting, approval of the script and choosing the director. On August 30, 1995 (a week after he and Abraham agreed to partner), Esparza returned to Corpus Christi from California and brought on Gregory Nava. Abraham disliked Esparza's decision and expressed concern about Nava's potential involvement.

Abraham told Esparza he did not want Nava to be the director because of his ego, though Esparza convinced Abraham that he was the perfect candidate. Producer Robert Katz later said Nava was chosen because other films he directed "[have] a very uplifting and positive quality" and believed they deal with "very strong and tragic elements." The Dallas Morning News found Nava's works to give "moviegoers a passionate, powerful look at Hispanic life". On September 8, 1995, Abraham informed the media his decision to partner with Esparza/Katz Productions and announced the film's budget to be in the range of $15 and $20 million. In an Entertainment Weekly interview, Abraham confessed on wanting the duo because they were "in tune with our culture". Other Hispanic filmmakers were considered to direct the film including Luis Valdez and Edward James Olmos (who later joined the cast for the film), but had settled with Nava. Katz said the team had overcome "what most people thought was a fatal contract" by entrusting Abraham's decisions and having a working relationship with him throughout the film's production: "working things out in advance so the studios knew exactly what we were proposing."

Nava began writing the script after recording the Quintanilla family on their stories about Selena. Suzette commented on how Nava took "hours and hours of little stories of our lives and what we would do and how we felt." Nava explained how some stories "had came out" during his recording sessions with the family and published the first draft on March 4, 1996. The incident where Selena and Perez eloped was written in the draft, which Abraham expressed disagreements on. Citing the singer's popularity with children, he was concerned that they could get the wrong message about elopement as being in her best interest.

Nava took a few days to persuade Abraham about the scene's content before he agreed to it, noting that although he understood Abraham's viewpoint, Selena's elopement was important to include because it was a major part of her story. He further insisted that his character's embrace of the match after the scene would shade a more positive tone after his earlier negative judgments on Selena and Perez's relationship. Curious about how Nava found out about the elopement, Abraham asked the director and found out that he had interviewed Perez, who had said that Selena had coaxed him into engagement. The earlier assumption was that Perez had pressured her into secretly getting married.

=== Casting ===
Roger Mussenden was hired as casting director, and he held casting calls throughout the United States including San Antonio, Texas, Miami, Chicago, New York City, and Los Angeles. Casting calls began on March 16, 1996, and concluded on March 23. Over 21,000 people auditioned for the title role, becoming the second largest audition since the search for Scarlett O'Hara in Gone with the Wind (1939). Casting turnouts reached 10,000 in Los Angeles and 5,000 in Chicago, while turnouts reached 8,000 in San Antonio. Mussenden chose newcomer 10-year-old Rebecca Lee Meza of Harlingen, Texas to portray young Selena.

Mexican actress Salma Hayek was invited to test the role of Selena by Esparza. Hayek turned the role down; she said she felt it was "too early" to base a movie on Selena and that it would be too emotional. Abraham discovered an actress in Los Angeles and wanted her for the role as Selena, despite her inability to convince the casting crew. He later had a change of heart when American actress and dancer Jennifer Lopez showed up for the audition.

Lopez found the audition process an elaborated procedure and was asked to sing, dance, and act out the elopement scene in front of the casting crew and Abraham. Within three takes of the elopement scene, Lopez convinced the entire casting crew who believed her performance was "among the strongest". Lopez had previously worked with Nava in My Family (1995). Screen testing was described as "grueling" and required "nine minutes of singing and dancing and eight pages of script." After the announcement that Lopez would portray Selena, news media and fans criticized Abraham for choosing Lopez, a New York City native born to Puerto Rican parents, to play a Texan of Mexican descent.

The Mexican media disapproved of the film and were outraged that Lopez was chosen for the title role. Lopez received backlash from the media and fans because she was not a Mexican American. The Hispanic community began protesting for a recast. During pre-production, Lopez stated: "I know a few people were protesting, but in Corpus [Selena's hometown] everyone has been really supportive". Nava admitted that the backlash was "a little hurtful", and felt the protesters "should be celebrating that we have an all-Latino cast and that Lopez, one of our own, is becoming a star." The announcement was described as the "role of a lifetime," with Lopez's salary for the film reportedly $1M USD, making Lopez the highest paid Hispanic actress up to that time. Dave Karger of Entertainment Weekly noted that "nothing could have prepared [Lopez] for the hype attached to her million-dollar salary."

On August 8, the Los Angeles Daily News announced that Jon Seda (who is of Puerto Rican descent) and Edward James Olmos (who is of Mexican descent, and previously became as one of the candidates for replacing Nava as the director) had joined the cast as Chris Pérez and Abraham Quintanilla, respectively. After Lopez landed the role, she decided to stay with Suzette Quintanilla, Selena's sister, at her home to study her character in the recordings and footage the family shared with her. Lopez felt that her "spirit and [Selena's] spirit were so similar" which was echoed by the singer's family who found that Lopez mimicked the personality traits of Selena. They believed that Lopez' body language, laugh and how she talked were identical to that of Selena.

Lopez had constant dance rehearsals for the film and said how she would arrive at the studio late in the day after finishing filming for another role. The family often had the entire main cast of the film over for dinner and would notice how they would watch them in their interactions with each other and the way they ate. Edward James Olmos, who took the role as Abraham, was asked to gain 40 pounds (18 kg) for the film. The cast found Olmos to be a father figure for them who often gave advice to the cast during filming.

A.B. found Olmos' portrayal of his father to be convincing, especially in the scene where Abraham was angered after finding out about Selena and Perez' relationship. Band member Pete Astudillo, commenting on production, said he had to do a screen test to play himself and had to improvise in several of his scenes, since he had little dialogue in the film.

Jon Seda often spent time with his subject Chris Pérez for character development. Seda visited Perez at the home he shared with Selena and found a price sticker in the bathroom with a scribbled letter that read "Selena and Chris, I Love You" which further inspired Seda to "show the love they [once] had" in the film. The biographical film focused on Selena's life rather than her death, with Nava saying, "I don't want to attend to [her murder]."

=== Filming ===
Principal photography began September 1996, in San Antonio, Corpus Christi, Poteet, Houston, and Lake Jackson, Texas. Nava used locals as extras for the film. Selena's singing voice was dubbed onto Lopez's performance. During the opening of the Selena Etc. boutique scene, Suzette Quintanilla, Selena's sister, believed Lopez was wearing Selena's clothing, but it was in fact a replica recreated by the film's costume designer.

Quintanilla expressed how she was overcome with emotions after seeing Lopez in a replica of the dress Selena had worn to the 1994 Grammy Awards. During the elopement scene, Pérez explained how the scene was reminiscent of the actual event as if he were "transported back in time," and remembered how he had a do not disturb sign and heard a knock on his door. He found the scene to be one of the hardest to watch after and recalled Selena told him that eloping was the only resource they had and they would never have a wedding she dreamed about. Pérez refused to visit the set and explained that he did not want to partake in the film's process.

Seda convinced Perez to visit the set for the scene where his character auditions for the role as the new guitarist for the band. After researching on how to perform a riff on a guitar and having lessons from Pérez, Seda felt that the scene would not come off as authentic since he could not replicate Pérez's guitar riffs. He tricked Pérez into visiting the set so that he could play the riff and have the director shoot a close up of his hands for the film. Seda said how after the film was released that people were convinced he could play the guitar; Seda said he revealed to fans how it was actually Perez performing the riff in the scene.

Nava pointed out how he wanted the performance scenes in the film to be "integrated into the drama and to reflect what the characters were going through emotionally and what Selena was going through emotionally at that particular time." He further explained how he wanted the Astrodome scene to be the opening of the film to show viewers at her height of her career and then flashback to show how she got there. The scene was shot at the San Antonio Alamodome on September 15, 1996, and was attended by 35,000 residents lured by newspaper ads.

Lopez expressed that she was nervous for the scene since it would be the first time she would perform in front of an audience of that size. Furthermore, she explained how uneven she felt due to the criticism she received and was unsure how fans would receive her. Jackie Guerra commented that during the scene she caught a glimpse of Selena's parents sobbing. The cast later expressed how they were overwhelmed with emotions once the scene was completed. Later that night, fans approached Lopez, sobbing and expressed to the actress that “she looked so much” like Selena and the public perception of Lopez changed after her performance.

The hospital scene set after Selena's death was shot once, making everyone present emotional. Guerra said how she was physically and emotionally drained after the filming the scene. She explained how she "could not imagine what's it like to be [the Quintanilla family]" and further said how she had to live with the pain for four months and found the pain the family goes through unimaginable. Lopez said it made her appreciate life even more, whereas Seda expressed that working on the film was one of the hardest for him in terms of departing from the cast.

=== Music ===
An original motion picture Selena soundtrack was released by EMI Latin on March 11, 1997, debuting at number 20 on the US Billboard 200. The soundtrack is a compilation of Selena's music, three of which are medleys of Selena's live recording remixed for the film, as well as tracks included in the film and tribute songs from various artists. The only songs featured on the soundtrack that were not in the film were "Is it the Beat," "Only Love" and "A Boy Like That," and Selena tributes sung by other artists. The only recordings heard in the film were the "Cumbia Medley," "Disco Medley" and "Where Did the Feeling Go?", which was played in the last half of the film's closing credits. The Vidal Brothers' "Oldies Medley" was also in the film. All the other songs, including rare tracks, hits and cuts like the "Disco Medley, Part II" (which was recorded live during Selena's 1995 concert at the Houston Livestock Show and Rodeo), were live recordings of Selena in concerts.

== Release ==
=== Box office ===
Selena opened March 21, 1997 and earned $11.6 million on its opening weekend. On its second weekend, the film earned $6.2 million. The following weekend, it earned $6.1 million. The film grossed $35.5 million domestically during its theatrical run.

=== Home media ===
Selena was released on VHS, Laserdisc, and DVD on September 23, 1997. A 10th Anniversary DVD edition was released on September 18, 2007, by Warner Home Video. The two-disc set contains the original theatrical version (127 minutes) and a director's cut version (134 minutes) of the film, which had been shown on several TV stations before. Extras include Making of Selena: 10 Years Later, Selena, Queen of Tejano, and nine additional scenes. Warner Archive Collection released the Blu-ray format for the first time on May 19, 2020, as a manufacture-on-demand title, and it contained both cuts of the film in addition to all the extras from the 10th Anniversary DVD. Selena was re-released in theaters on April 7, 2022, by Iconic Distribution, to mark twenty five years of the classic film.

== Reception ==
=== Critical response ===
Selena received mostly positive reviews from critics. The review aggregator Rotten Tomatoes reported that 66% of critics gave the film a positive review based on 85 reviews, with an average score of 6/10. The critics’ consensus reads, "Selena occasionally struggles to tell its subject's story with depth or perspective, but those flaws are rendered largely irrelevant by Jennifer Lopez in the title role." At Metacritic, which assigns a rating out of 100 to reviews from mainstream critics, the film has received an average score of 67 based on 17 reviews, indicating "generally favorable" reviews. Audiences polled by CinemaScore gave the film an average grade of "A" on an A+ to F scale.

Roger Ebert, film critic for the Chicago Sun-Times, was impressed by the acting, and gave Selena three-and-a-half stars out of four and wrote, "Young Selena is played by Becky Lee Meza, who has a big smile and a lot of energy. The teenage and adult Selena is played by Lopez in a star-making performance. After her strong work as the passionate lover of Jack Nicholson in the current Blood and Wine, here she creates a completely different performance, as a loyal Quintanilla who does most of her growing up on a tour bus with her dad at the wheel." Entertainment Weekly believed Lopez perfected Selena's accent while "studying performance footage of the pop sensation" according to Nava. Lopez said "you need to do your homework on this gig" because Selena was "fresh in the public's mind".

Film critic Lisa Kropiewnicki liked the film and wrote, "Jennifer Lopez delivers a breakout performance...[and] Nava's engaging script wisely mines his subject's life for humor and conflict, embracing Selena Quintanilla's passion for music." Film critic James Berardinelli also liked the film and the screenplay, writing, "It would have been easy to trivialize Selena's story, turning it into a sudsy, made-for-TV type motion picture." He believed the acting was top-notch and wrote "Jennifer Lopez is radiant as the title character, conveying the boundless energy and enthusiasm that exemplified Selena, while effectively copying not only her look but her mannerisms. I wonder if Selena's family, upon watching this performance, felt an eerie sense of déjà vu."

Los Angeles Times film critic Kenneth Turan gave the film a mixed review. He wrote the film is part of a "completely predictable Latino soap opera." However, he added that "there are chunks of Selena that only a stone could resist. This movie turns out to be a celebration not only of the singer but also (as "What's Love" was for Angela Bassett) of the actress who plays her, Jennifer Lopez." Leonard Maltin gave the film two-and-a-half stars out of four; while he praised Lopez and Olmos, he called the film a "glossy, congenially corny biography. "Ironically," Maltin wrote, "the film does more to solidify Selena's celebrity than she was able to accomplish in her short lifetime."

Some critics, however, did not like how the film appeared to be a sanitized Selena portrait. Critic Walter Addiego considers Nava's work a worshipful biography of her. Addiego, writing for the San Francisco Examiner, did have a few enjoyable moments viewing the film but wrote, "You can't help cheering for Selena, but the good feeling is diminished by the sense that her story's been simplified and sanitized."

== Accolades ==
Award	Date	Category	Recipient(s)	Result	Ref.
ALMA Awards	June 4, 1998	Outstanding Feature Film		Won	
ALMA Awards	June 4, 1998	Outstanding Actor in a Feature Film	Edward James Olmos	Won	
ALMA Awards	June 4, 1998	Outstanding Actor in a Feature Film	Jon Seda	Nominated	
ALMA Awards	June 4, 1998	Outstanding Actress in a Feature Film	Jackie Guerra	Nominated	
ALMA Awards	June 4, 1998	Outstanding Actress in a Feature Film	Jennifer Lopez	Won	
ALMA Awards	June 4, 1998	Outstanding Latino Director of a Feature Film	Gregory Nava	Won	
Golden Globe Awards	January 18, 1998	Best Actress in a Motion Picture – Musical or Comedy	Jennifer Lopez	Nominated	
Grammy Awards	February 25, 1998	Best Instrumental Composition Written for a Motion Picture or for Television	Dave Grusin	Nominated	
Imagen Awards	April 1, 1998	Best Theatrical Feature Film		Won (Note: Tied with The Disappearance of Garcia Lorca.)	
Imagen Awards	April 1, 1998	Lasting Image Award	Jennifer Lopez	Won	
Lone Star Film & Television Awards	1998	Best Actress	Jennifer Lopez	Won	
Lone Star Film & Television Awards	1998	Best Supporting Actor	Edward James Olmos	Won	
MTV Movie Awards	May 30, 1998	Best Breakthrough Performance	Jennifer Lopez	Nominated	
Young Artist Awards	March 14, 1998	Best Performance in a Feature Film – Supporting Young Actress	Rebecca Lee Meza	Nominated	

== Legacy and recent history ==
In Latin Sensations (2001), Herón Márquez noted that the film's success "introduced English-speaking America to Selena's music, made Jennifer Lopez a bona fide star, and awakened Corporate America to the enormous and growing presence—and buying power—of Latinos in the United States."

On January 1, 2021, all 38 members of the Congressional Hispanic Caucus signed a letter addressed to the Library of Congress "formally nominating" Selena to be added to the National Film Registry. The lobbying effort aimed at Carla Hayden was led by Representative Joaquin Castro (D–TX), chairman of the caucus, and framed the act as a way to, among other things, more broadly recognize Latino contributions to film, increase acclaim of Latino cinema and effect broader cinematic representation. On December 14, 2021, the film was officially selected for preservation in the United States National Film Registry by the Library of Congress for being "culturally, historically, or aesthetically significant."

Selena: The Series is a biographical television series about the late singer Selena Quintanilla. The series comes 23 years after its original film and premiered on Netflix on December 4, 2020.

== Bibliography ==
- Marquez, Herón (2001). Latin Sensations. Twenty-First Century Books. ISBN 9780822549932.
- Arrarás, María Celeste (1997). Selena's Secret: The Revealing Story Behind Her Tragic Death. Simon and Schuster. ISBN 978-0684831930.
- Stacy, Lee (2002). Mexico and the United States. Marshall Cavendish. ISBN 978-0761474029.
- Jasinski, Laurie E. (2012). Handbook of Texas Music. Texas A&M University Press. ISBN 978-0876112977.
- Tracy, Kathleen (2008). Jennifer Lopez: A Biography. Greenwood Publishing Group. ISBN 978-0313355158.
