= Dino Ortolani =

- Oz character
- First appearance: "The Routine" (episode 1.01)
- Last appearance: "A Day in the Death..." (episode 6.06)
- Created by: Tom Fontana
- Portrayed by: Jon Seda

In-universe information
- Family: Nino Schibetta (uncle); Peter Schibetta (cousin)

Dino Ortolani, played by Jon Seda, is a fictional character who appeared in three episodes of the HBO series Oz. Although he dies in the first episode of the series, which is more or less centered on his character, his death has a strong impact on the rest of the first season.

== Character overview ==
"Prisoner #96C382: Dino Ortolani. Convicted December 12, 1996 - One count of murder in the first degree, assault with a deadly weapon. Sentence: Life imprisonment without the possibility of parole."

The epitome of a macho Italian gangster, Ortolani is bitter, homophobic and hotheaded. He is also the nephew of Nino Schibetta and the cousin of Peter Schibetta. He is in prison for shooting and nearly killing Ryan O'Reily as well as murdering another Irish gangster in the process.

=== Season 1 ===
Ortolani runs the kitchen for his uncle, Italian mafioso Nino Schibetta, whom he is very close to. Like most of the Italian-American inmates, he dislikes the Black inmates, unconcerned with the fact that they constitute the majority of the kitchen staff. He is disliked and feared by most of the staff and other inmates, although, his toughness and racism is somewhat admired by Aryan Brotherhood leader Vernon Schillinger; Ortolani makes it known that the feeling is not mutual. When Ortolani learns that Ryan O'Reily is alive and coming to Oz, he schemes to have his old enemy killed (and later almost succeeds in drowning O'Reily in one of the bathroom toilets before his conscience gets the better of him).

When gay inmate Billie Keane flirts with him in the shower room, Ortolani beats and nearly cripples Keane before being restrained by officers. This enrages Billie's brother Jefferson Keane, the leader of the Black Homeboys gang, who, later along with O'Reily, plots to kill Ortolani in retaliation.

Having already thrown Ortolani in solitary confinement on a multitude of occasions for fighting, Unit Manager Tim McManus lets Ortolani know that every prisoner and guard in Oz hates him or is scared of him (or both), something Ortolani does not seem to mind. Instead of placing him in the hole again, McManus sends him to work in the AIDS ward, hoping to teach him a lesson in tolerance. Disgusted at the prospect of working with homosexuals and fearful of being exposed to the disease, Ortolani asks Nino to get him out of it, which he refuses. While he serves his time in the AIDS ward, Ortolani develops an infatuation with Dr. Gloria Nathan, who believes his violent tendencies could be eased with medication. Although Ortolani is initially disgusted by the patients surrounding him on the ward, he begins to form a bond with Emilio Sanchez, a heroin addict who is in the end stages of AIDS after contracting HIV through sharing needles. Sanchez eventually asks Ortolani to end his suffering. Ortolani doesn't agree immediately, but returns later to do as Sanchez asked him, disconnecting him from life support and smothering him to death.

After he is caught killing Sanchez, McManus and Nathan throw him into the isolation ward and have him drugged following a beating from officers. Keane then gives the order to Johnny Post and O'Reily to kill him. O'Reily uses his connections to allow Post entry to the hole, who then pours flammable liquid onto a comatose Ortolani, setting him on fire and burning him to death. Subsequently, Ortolani makes a brief cameo appearance in the season finale during a brief hallucination by McManus during the riot.

Ortolani is portrayed as callous, hotheaded, and bigoted, but is not without positive qualities such as kindness and mercy, which reveal themselves as the prospect of spending the rest of his life in prison begins to set in as a reality. Throughout the first episode, Ortolani is seen to admire new inmate Kareem Said, whom he watches during his lectures to his fellow Muslim inmates; he later tells Said, "It's too bad you're of the wrong color," after Said attempts to connect with him in a hallway before taking off. He is also forced to sponsor new inmate Tobias Beecher, whom he takes no interest in, but does offer some advice about surviving in prison. When Schillinger attempts to congratulate him for his assault on Keane, believing it to be racially motivated, Ortolani makes it clear that he does not want his admiration, nor does he respect or agree with his racist attitude. He loves his wife and children, but has difficulty expressing those feelings, eventually asking them to not return as it is too emotionally hard for him. During his interrogation, inmate Bob Rebadow says that God told him that Ortolani wanted to kill himself rather than spend the rest of his life in prison, away from his wife and children.

=== Season 6 ===
In the sixth and final season, Ortolani's spirit co-narrates the episode #54, "A Day in the Death".
