= Chris Pérez =

American guitarist (born 1969)

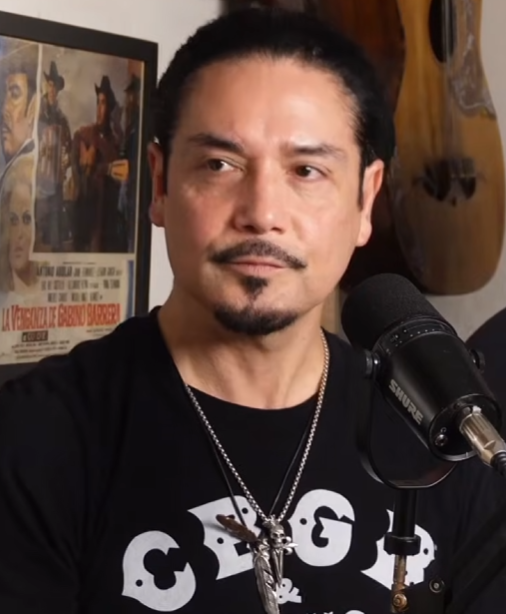
- Pérez in 2026
- Born: Christopher Gilbert Pérez; August 14, 1969 (age 57); San Antonio, Texas, U.S.
- Education: Thomas Jefferson High School
- Occupation: Musician
- Spouses: Selena (m. 1992; died 1995); Vanessa Villanueva (m. 2001; div. 2008)
- Children: 2
- Family: Abraham Quintanilla (father-in-law); A.B. Quintanilla (brother-in-law); Suzette Quintanilla (sister-in-law)
- Musical career
- Genres: Rock; latin rock; cumbia; Tejano; heavy metal
- Instrument: Guitar
- Years active: 1986–present
- Labels: EMI Latin; Hollywood Records; Q-Productions

Christopher Gilbert Pérez (born August 14, 1969) is an American guitarist best known for having been the lead guitarist of the Tejano music band Selena y Los Dinos. He married the frontwoman of the group, Selena, on April 2, 1992. Pérez grew up in San Antonio, Texas as one of two children of Gilbert Pérez and Carmen Medina. In 1986, he began his tenure by joining Shelly Lares' band. By the late 1980s, Pérez was respected among Tejano musicians for his guitar skills. This caught A.B. Quintanilla's attention; at the time, A.B. was seeking another guitarist for the band he produced, Selena y Los Dinos. Between one and two years after Pérez joined the band, he and Selena began a personal relationship.

Selena's father, Abraham Quintanilla, forced them to end their relationship because he felt Pérez's image might damage Selena's career. They ignored his threats that he would disband the group, and continued their relationship. Abraham fired Pérez from the band, forbidding Selena to go with him. Pérez eloped with Selena in 1992. On March 31, 1995, Selena was shot and killed by her former friend and former manager of her boutiques, Yolanda Saldívar. Selena's murder greatly devastated Pérez, who began abusing drugs and alcohol.

Pérez formed the Chris Pérez Band and began writing songs for their debut album. They signed with Hollywood Records and released their first album, Resurrection, which won a Grammy Award for Best Latin Rock or Alternative Album. The band disbanded after their second album, Una Noche Mas (2002), was released. Pérez continued in the music business and often played with A.B.'s groups, the Kumbia Kings and the Kumbia All Starz. He left both groups and formed another band (the Chris Pérez Project, which included American singer Angel Ferrer) in 2010. In 2012, Pérez wrote a book about his relationship with Selena, entitled To Selena, with Love.

== Early life ==
Christopher Gilbert Pérez was born on August 14, 1969, in San Antonio, Texas to Gilbert Pérez, a computer programmer, and Carmen Medina, who worked at City Hall, in the Finance/Accounting Department at one point. He is of Mexican-American ancestry. Perez's parents divorced in 1974, when he was four years old. His mother remarried in 1978.

Pérez learned to play the French horn in middle school and joined his school's concert band with his mother's support. He decided to teach himself to play electric guitar, despite his mother's disapproval, due to the negative stereotypes associated with the rock-and-roll world. Pérez's favorite musicians were Van Halen, Mötley Crüe, Def Leppard, Kiss, the Scorpions, Ozzy Osbourne and, Iron Maiden. He also grew to admire Ricky Martin, during the 1990s. Many of his guitar solos are inspired by Carlos Santana.

Pérez wanted to run away to Los Angeles, California to start a rock band, when he was seventeen. At the time, he shared an apartment with his father and worked at a library. Pérez was then asked by Tony Lares to join his cousin, Shelly Lares' band, in 1986. Lares told Pérez that Shelly performed Tejano music—a mixture of traditional Mexican folk music, polkas and, country music sung in Spanish or English. Pérez disliked Tejano music and wrote in - "To Selena, With Love" - that he joined Shelly's band with "foot-dragging resistance" because this job paid more than working at the library. He became Shelly's musical director after Tony left the group, and co-wrote three songs for Shelly's debut album in 1989. His guitar playing received a positive reception from the band and its fans. Around this time, he also formed a rock band with two friends and planned to leave Shelly's band.

== Career ==
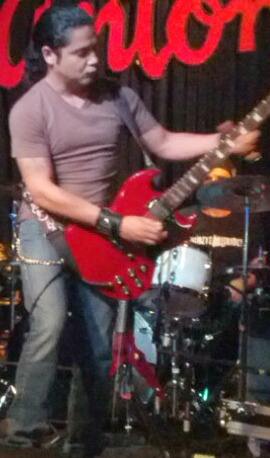
Pérez performing in 2012

=== 1989–1995: Selena y Los Dinos ===
Roger Garcia, lead guitarist for Selena y Los Dinos, married and left the music business in 1989. The group's bassist, A.B. Quintanilla III, had heard good things about Pérez from other Tejano groups. He and other band members went to watch Pérez rehearse with Shelly. Quintanilla invited Chris to one of Selena's performances, and asked if he was interested in playing with Selena y Los Dinos. Pérez accepted, basing his decision on Los Dinos's sound, which was more "hip and sophisticated" than other Tejano bands, and he hoped to learn more about musical arrangement from A.B., whose work he admired.

Pérez auditioned for the group's manager, A.B.'s father Abraham Quintanilla Jr. Abraham initially disliked Pérez's rocker image and insisted that he change his appearance for the band. The elder Quintanilla feared that allowing Pérez in the group might affect his daughter Selena's "perfect image" and ruin her career. A.B. convinced his father to accept Pérez, and encouraged Pérez to explore different musical genres and mold their sounds to his own tastes. He and A.B became close friends occasionally collaborated on writing songs for Selena's next recording. Pérez, like Selena, knew little Spanish, and lead keyboardist Ricky Vela tutored him.

==== Relationship with Selena ====
In 1989, Pérez and A.B. wrote Selena's Coca-Cola commercial jingle. After the company accepted the lyrics and Selena filmed the commercial, A.B. treated the band to a vacation in Acapulco, Mexico. During the trip Pérez realized he was attracted to Selena although he had a girlfriend in San Antonio. Pérez thought it best for both of them if he tried to distance himself from her, but found it difficult and decided to try building a relationship with her. They expressed their feelings for each other at a Pizza Hut restaurant, and shortly afterwards became a couple. They hid their relationship from her father out of fear that Abraham would try to break them up. This stressed Selena, who did not want to hide her feelings.

Suzette ended up reporting the relationship to Abraham, who took Pérez off the bus and informed him that it was over. The couple continued their relationship secretly despite Abraham's disapproval. Selena took hope from the fact that her mother Marcella approved of their courtship, until one day when Abraham stopped the tour bus and went to the back where Pérez and Selena were sitting. He shouted that their relationship was over and Selena screamed back at him. Pérez tried to calm them both down, but joined in the argument after Abraham insulted him by calling him a "cancer in my family." Finally Abraham threatened to disband the group if they did not break up. Intimidated, Selena and Pérez backed off. Abraham fired him from the band and prevented Selena from running off with him, leaving Selena both extremely devastated and heartbroken.

After Pérez was fired from the band, he moved back in with his father and began playing music wherever he could. He wrote that "free of that nerve-racking situation with her father and the other members of Los Dinos, I started enjoying my life again." Selena, however, suffered from their separation and the two tried to keep in touch while she was touring. On the morning of April 2, 1992, Selena pounded on his hotel-room door. She forced her way in and began to cry, saying she could not go on without him. Selena wanted to get married that day, but Pérez argued it was not the right thing to do at the moment. Selena insisted her father would never accept their relationship, and would not attend any wedding they planned. Pérez agreed and they eloped in Nueces County, Texas.

Selena was sure her father would leave them alone if they were married, and they could be together openly. They planned to keep the elopement a secret until she found the right moment to reveal her marriage, but the media announced their elopement over the radio within hours of the marriage ceremony. Selena's family tried to track her down. Abraham did not take the news well, and alienated himself for a time. Selena and Pérez moved into an apartment in Corpus Christi until Abraham approached them, apologized, accepted the marriage and Pérez back into the band.

Pérez became a fully accepted member of the Quintanilla family after the marriage, and Abraham asked Pérez to write songs for a rock band he was managing after he opened a recording studio, Q-Productions, in late 1993. That collaboration resulted in a posthumous recording for Selena when the lead vocalist for that rock group, Nando "Guerro" Dominguez, went to Selena's house to begin a recording. Pérez was ending the recording session several hours later when Selena asked to record Dominguez's demo. Her version of the song was unreleased until 2004, when it was added to her posthumous compilation album Momentos Intimos as "Puede Ser". A.B. wrote "Ya No", the last recording for Selena's studio album Amor Prohibido (1994). He wanted to turn it into a rock song and asked for Pérez's assistance.

=== 1995–1998: After Selena, remarriage and fatherhood ===
In spring 1995, Abraham found out that Yolanda Saldívar, who managed Selena's boutiques and fan club, was embezzling money. They held a meeting in early March, with Saldívar denying she had anything to do with fiscal discrepancies in checks that were found written in her name. Selena tried to repair her friendship with Saldívar despite her father's warnings. On March 30, 1995, Selena and Pérez met with Saldívar at a motel to recover missing financial papers for tax purposes. When Selena and Pérez arrived home she found that Saldivar did not give her the correct documents. She phoned Saldívar, who tried to convince Selena to return to her motel room alone. Pérez insisted that it was too late, and he did not want Selena driving alone at night. Selena then agreed to meet with Saldívar the next morning.

On March 31, Selena woke up early to meet Saldívar at the motel where she was staying. She met with Saldívar, who delayed the transfer of papers with a story about having been raped in Mexico. Selena took Saldívar to a local hospital, where doctors found no evidence of rape. When they returned to the motel room, Selena ended their four-year working relationship. As Selena turned to leave, Saldívar allegedly reached into her purse, pulled out a Taurus Model 85 .38 caliber revolver, pointed it at Selena and pulled the trigger. The bullet entered Selena's right shoulder blade from the back, piercing a major artery running from her heart and exiting from just below her right collarbone. She ran to the motel lobby and collapsed to the floor. As the motel employees gathered round, she named Saldívar as her assailant. Selena was transferred to a nearby hospital, where doctors found the damage irreparable. She was pronounced dead within the hour.

Pérez could not eat for two days after his wife's murder. In his book he says that when he could not sleep he began abusing alcohol and other drugs, and went into seclusion. Family members noticed he was rapidly losing weight. Chris felt guilty for not protecting Selena from Saldívar.

In 1996, he moved out of his Corpus Christi house and back in with his father in San Antonio. John Garza introduced him to Venessa Villanueva, and after getting to know each other they became a couple in 1998. In 2001, Pérez married Villanueva and they had two children, a boy, Noah, and a girl, Cassie.

Although it was rumored that Villanueva did not want to divorce, and wanted to try and work things out in their relationship, the couple finally decided their relationship was irreconcilable. They filed for divorce in 2008. Despite getting married again and having two children, Pérez has since remained in touch with the Quintanillas following Selena's death.

=== 1999–2010: Chris Pérez Band, Kumbia Kings and Kumbia All Starz ===
"Best I Can"
The rock ballad "Best I Can", which centers around the difficulty of Pérez' life without Selena, was received favorably by critics. Vocals by John Garza, with lyrics by Pérez

Pérez's friend, John Garza moved in with him six months after Selena's death. They began writing music, which Pérez found healing. In 1998 he formed a rock band with Garza, Rudy Martinez (former member of La Mafia) on bass, former Selena y Los Dinos keyboardist Joe Ojeda and Jesse Esquivel on drums. The band's name (the Chris Pérez Band) was chosen by Garza, Martinez, Ojeda and Esquivel. Chris preferred the name Cinco Souls, but the other band members wanted to utilize his "reluctant celebrity." The band was signed to Hollywood Records, and went to A&M Studios in Los Angeles to begin recording their debut album. Pérez wrote the song "Best I Can" to explore his feelings about losing Selena and his struggle to continue without her. The song was not planned for the album, for fear that listeners would think he included the track for commercial reasons, but Hollywood Records and the band convinced him to include it on the album after hearing the demo.

"Another Day" (about devotion to Selena) was included on the album. Ojeda wrote "Solo Tu", a romantic ballad which Pérez changed into a rock song. Resurrection was released on May 18, 1999, and won the 2000 Grammy Award for Grammy Award for Best Latin Rock, Urban or Alternative Album. The record company released two promotional singles (one English and one Spanish: the title track and the ballad "Por Que Tu Fuiste") to radio stations with intent to appeal to both audiences. The Los Angeles Times wrote that the album was "upbeat and danceable, the lyrics speak almost uniformly of loss, anger, violence and abandonment". The Chris Pérez Band was the opening act for Mexican band Maná. In March 2000, Pérez began preparing for his second studio album; On April 16, the band released its second and final album, Una Noche Más, before breaking up. Pérez joined his brother-in-law A.B.'s band, the Kumbia All Starz, in 2006 and left it in 2010 to form his own band. On April 7, 2005, Los Dinos reunited at the Selena ¡VIVE! tribute concert.

=== 2010–present: The Chris Pérez Project, To Selena, With Love, Blue Mariachi Productions ===
In 2010, Pérez formed a new group (the Chris Pérez Project) with Puerto Rican singer Angel Ferrer, releasing "Todo es Diferente".

In March 2012 Pérez published To Selena, With Love, which described their relationship and struggles. He had been reluctant to write the book, saying that fans asked him to write it. He did not seek the approval of the Quintanilla family to write To Selena, With Love and did not disclose the project in fear of their reaction. He approached Abraham after the book was finished. Abraham approved of it. In an interview with The Hollywood Reporter, Pérez said writing To Selena, With Love helped him "move forward". The book was praised by critics and fans. To Selena, With Love dispelled the rumor that Selena was pregnant when she died (which had appeared in media reports after her death).

In November 2016, Pérez announced that a made-for-television miniseries would be made from his book. This prompted Abraham to file a lawsuit against him since it violated an estate properties agreement originally signed between him and the family two months after Selena's death in 1995. The lawsuit also sparked a bitter dispute between the family and Pérez, who in September 2020, went on Instagram and publicly accused the Quintanilla family of erasing his legacy with Selena. Suzette posted a rebuttal shortly thereafter and Perez later apologized. The case was settled in September 2021.

In August 2021 Pérez's label Blue Mariachi Productions signed its first act, ZEUS. El Mero Necio alias Carlton Zeus.

In December 2021, the 1997 biopic Selena was inducted into the National Film Registry on the film's 25th anniversary. Pérez recognized the occasion by posting a statement and photo of a white rose.

== Personality and musical influences ==
According to The Dallas Morning News, Hollywood.com, Justice for Selena, They Died Too Young and Selena: Como La Flor, Pérez is a shy person. He was the antithesis of Abraham Quintanilla's "clean-cut, nice kids" in his early career as a guitarist for Selena y Los Dinos, a rebellious rocker and a "long-haired tough guy". In an interview with the Corpus Christi Caller-Times, he admitted discomfort at being an entertainer. Until the release of his book, he had kept quiet about his personal life and shied away from media attention. Carlos Valdez, the District Attorney who prosecuted Yolanda Saldívar, described Pérez as "shy and uncomfortable when in the spotlight", and this was echoed by the Corpus Christi Caller-Times. His inability to talk about himself when interviewed was also discussed in Valdez' book. Valdez said the music business was not work for Pérez, who enjoyed being a guitarist and called it his "reason for [his] existence". Valdez considers him "honest, sincere, and someone who could be trusted and believed [in]."

Leila Cobo of Billboard magazine believed his musical styles included contemporary cumbia music, reminiscent of music produced by A.B., R&B, rap and funk music. Chuck Taylor, a Billboard editor, called The Chris Pérez Project debut album a "lot of classic rock elements". David Cazares of the Sun Sentinel called Pérez' debut album "average rock" music. The San Antonio Express-News said that Resurrection was a fusion of "pop rock grooves and Tejano soul". Pérez is known for tapping into Latin genres, such as cumbia and Latin rock.

In the 1997 biopic-film, Selena, Pérez was portrayed by Jon Seda while actor Jesse Posey portrayed him in Selena: The Series.

== Discography ==
Selena y Los Dinos

- Ven Conmigo (1990)
- Entre a Mi Mundo (1992)
- Selena Live! (1993)
- Amor Prohibido (1994)
- Dreaming of You (1995)

Chris Pérez Band

- Resurrection (1999)
- Una Noche Más (2002)

Kumbia Kings

- Amor, Familia y Respeto (1999)
- Shhh! (2001)
- All Mixed Up: Los Remixes (2002)
- 4 (2003)
- Los Remixes 2.0 (2004)
- Fuego (2004)
- Kumbia Kings Live (2006)

Kumbia All Starz

- Ayer Fue Kumbia Kings, Hoy Es Kumbia All Starz (2006)
- Planeta Kumbia (2008)
- La Vida de un Genio (2010)

== Published works ==
- To Selena, With Love (2012)

== Bibliography ==
- Patoski, Joe (1997), Selena Como La Flor, Little, Brown and Company, p. 356, ISBN 978-0-316-69378-3
- Pérez, Chris (2012), To Selena, With Love, Celebra Books, p. 294, ISBN 978-0-451-41404-5
- Ruiz, Vickie; Sánchez Korrol, Virginia (2006), Latinas in the United States, set: A Historical Encyclopedia, Indiana University Press, p. 944, ISBN 0-253-11169-2
- Valdez, Carlos (2005), Justice for Selena: The State Versus Yolanda Saldivar, Trafford Publishing, p. 428, ISBN 1-4120-6525-9
- Novas, Himilce; Silva, Rosemary (1995), Remembering Selena: A Tribute In Pictures & Words / Recordando Selena: Un Tributo en Palabras y Fotos, St. Martin's Press, p. 128, ISBN 978-0-312-14160-8
- Jones, Veda (2000), They Died Too Young, Chelsea House Publications, p. 48, ISBN 0-7910-5230-3
