= Moisés Zamora =

Mexican-American writer, director and producer

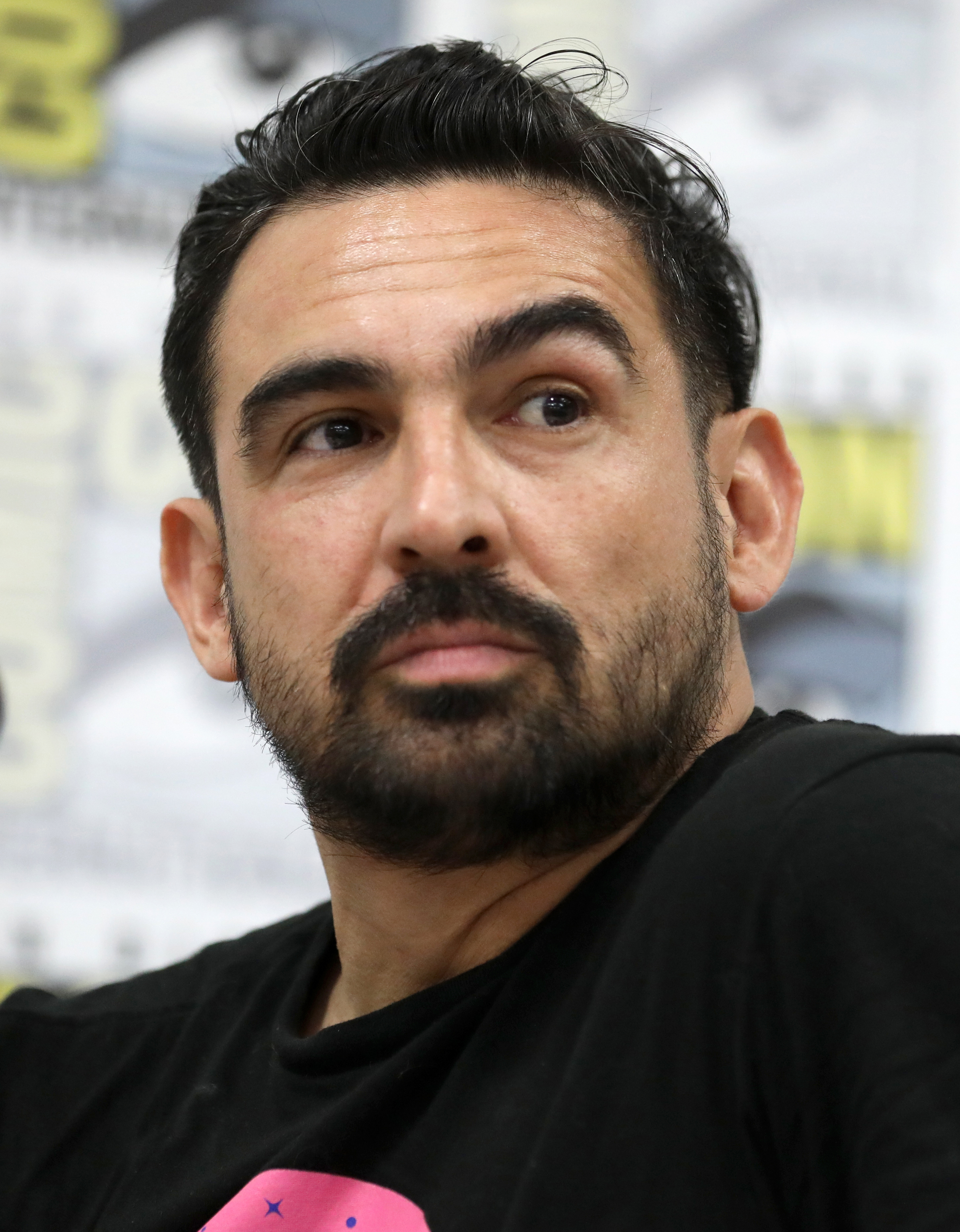
- Born: Guadalajara, Mexico
- Occupations: Writer; director; producer

Moisés Zamora is a Mexican-American writer, director, and producer. He is best known as the creator of the Netflix's Selena: The Series. He was a staff writer for American Crime and Star.

== Early life ==
Zamora was born in Guadalajara, Mexico, and immigrated to California at the age of 11. He is a graduate of Brown University, majoring in International Relations.

== Filmography ==
| Year | Title | Contribution | Note |
|---|---|---|---|
| 2009 | The Thief of Things | Director and producer | Documentary |
| 2010 | Jóvenes vivos | Director and producer | Documentary |
| 2017 | American Crime | Staff writer | TV Series |
| 2017-2018 | Star | Staff writer | TV Series |
| 2020-2021 | Selena: The Series | Creator and writer | TV Series |

== Awards and nominations ==
| Year | Result | Award | Category | Work | Ref. |
|---|---|---|---|---|---|
| 2011 | Won | Oaxaca FilmFest | Best Documentary by a Mexican Director | Jóvenes vivos | |
