= Una Noche Más =

2002 studio album by Chris Pérez Band

Studio album by Chris Pérez Band
- Released: April 16, 2002
- Recorded: 2001–2002
- Genre: Latin, rock, Tejano
- Label: Univision Music Group
- Producer: A.B. Quintanilla III

Chris Pérez Band chronology
Resurrection (1999)	Una Noche Más (2002)

Una Noche Más is the second and final studio album by Chris Pérez Band. It was released on April 16, 2002.

== Track listing ==
No.	Title	Length
1.	"Dime Por Qué Te Vas"	3:51
2.	"Una Noche Más"	3:54
3.	"Selena= Lo Mejor De Todo"	3:51
4.	"Como La Primera Vez"	4:23
5.	"Amor Secreto"	3:31
6.	"Ahora Que Voy A Marcharme"	4:19
7.	"Me Duele Más A Mi"	3:55
8.	"Y Yo Te Voy A Amar"	4:39
9.	"Me Cansé"	3:43
10.	"Como Puedes"	3:51
11.	"Por Qué Duele Tanto"	3:52
12.	"Y No Me Miras Igual"	3:40
13.	"La Gorda"	3:37
14.	"Dime Por Qué Te Vas (Versión Pop)"	3:53
15.	"Lo Mejor De Todo (Versión Pop)"	3:43
