= Jon Seda =

American actor (born 1970)

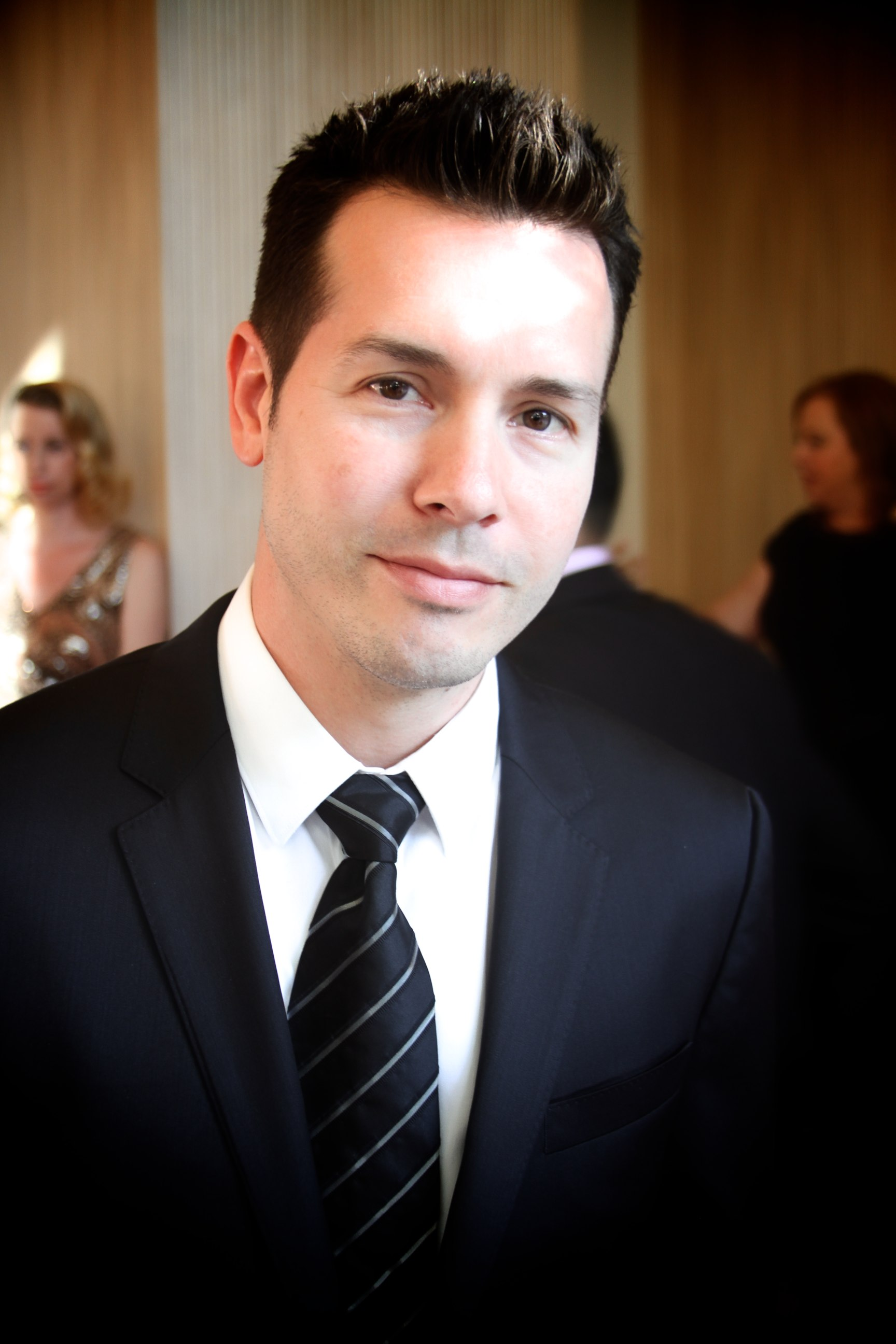
- Seda at the 2014 Imagen Awards
- Born: October 14, 1970 (age 56); Manhattan, New York, U.S.
- Occupation: Actor
- Years active: 1991–present
- Spouse: Lisa Gomez (m. 2000)
- Children: 2

Jon Seda (born October 14, 1970) is an American actor. Seda was an amateur boxer who auditioned for and was given a role in the 1992 boxing film Gladiator. He played the role of Chris Pérez alongside Jennifer Lopez in the movie Selena, and portrayed U.S. Marine John Basilone, recipient of the Medal of Honor, in Tom Hanks and Steven Spielberg's The Pacific. On television, he had roles as Detective Antonio Dawson in NBC's Chicago P.D., and as Paul Falsone in NBC's Homicide: Life on the Street.

== Early life ==
Seda was born in Manhattan, to parents of Puerto Rican descent and raised in Clifton, New Jersey. After graduating from Clifton High School, Seda was convinced by two friends that he should take up boxing, so he began working out in a gym.

He boxed in several gyms in New Jersey and soon was a runner up in the New Jersey Golden Gloves competition. As an amateur boxer, Seda had a record of 21 wins and one loss.

== Career ==
Seda's film debut was in the boxing film Gladiator (1992), in which he played the role of Romano, a Cuban boxer. He has since worked in various films and TV series. In 1995, Seda was nominated Best Male Lead at the Spirit Awards for his role in the movie I Like It Like That (1994), opposite Rita Moreno and Lauren Vélez. In 1996, he played Blue, opposite actor Woody Harrelson, in the film The Sunchaser, which premiered at the 1996 Cannes Film Festival.

Seda became widely known to the Hispanic film audience when he portrayed Chris Pérez alongside Jennifer Lopez in Selena (1997), a film based on the true story of the Tejano singer, Selena Quintanilla-Perez, who was murdered on her way to mainstream stardom. Seda played Selena's husband.

Also in 1997, Seda landed the role of Detective Paul Falsone on NBC's: Homicide: Life on the Street. The writers, taking advantage of his boxing background, wrote a shirtless practice bout into an episode, which established his character's attractiveness to fellow detective Laura Ballard. Seda also boxed opposite Jimmy Smits in the film Price of Glory (2000).

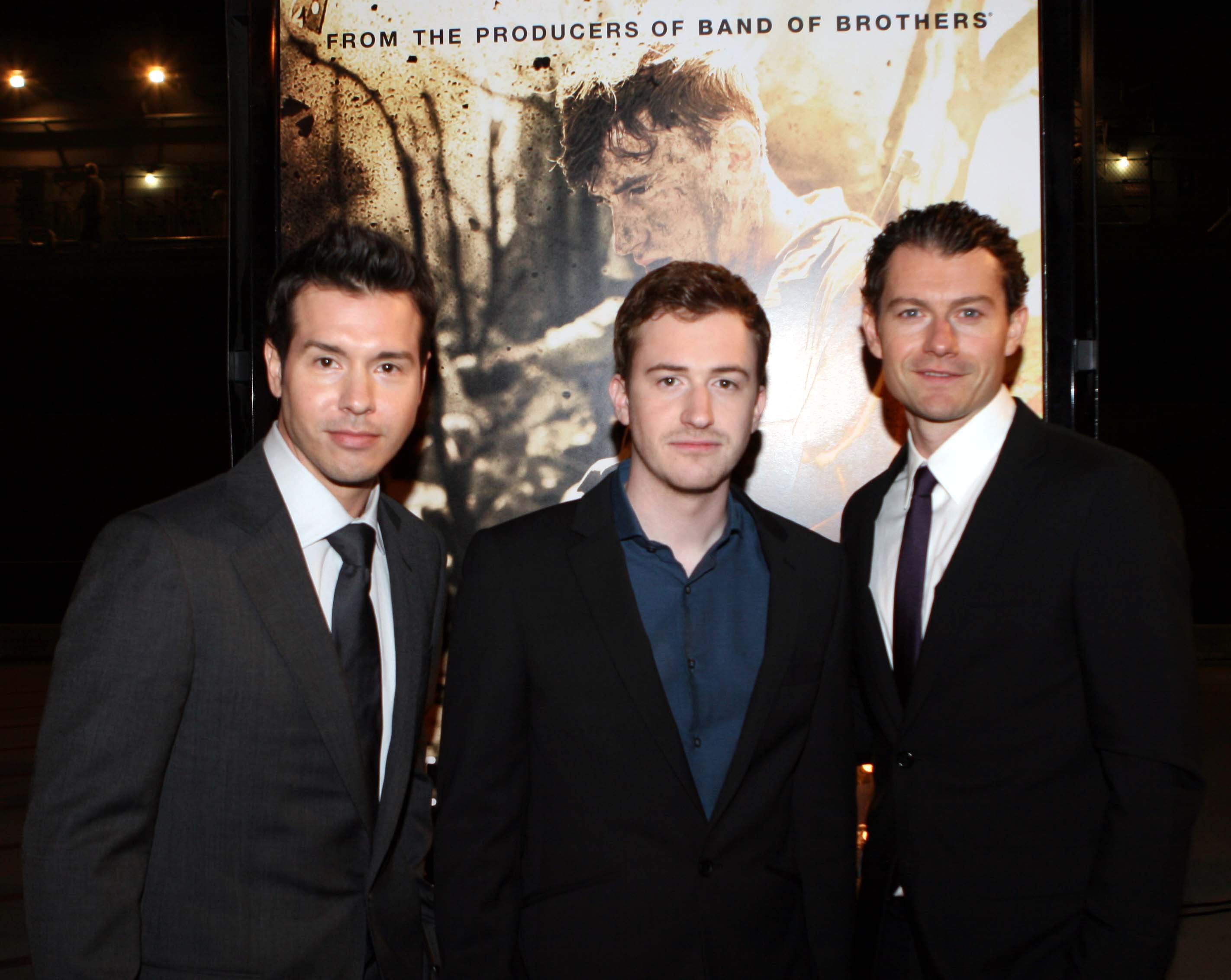
Seda (left) with Joseph Mazzello and James Badge Dale at a screening for The Pacific

His first leading role on the large screen was as the protagonist in 2002's King Rikki, a re-imagining of Shakespeare's Richard III in East L.A.

Seda has appeared in more than two dozen movies, including Bad Boys II (2003) as Roberto, as well as numerous television appearances. Aside from Homicide, he has had notable roles as Dino Ortolani in Oz, Matty Caffey in Third Watch, Paul Falsone (in a Homicide crossover with Law & Order), House, and CSI: Miami. He is featured as one of the three leads in the HBO World War II mini-series The Pacific (released on March 14, 2010), portraying Marine John Basilone. Seda appeared as a guest star in an episode of Burn Notice, and in 2007, he made a cameo appearance in Ludacris' song "Runaway Love", as an abusive, alcoholic stepfather.

Seda appeared in Treme seasons 2-4 as Nelson Hidalgo, a politically connected land developer from Dallas who helps out with the relief efforts in post-Katrina New Orleans. He appeared in the film Larry Crowne (2011), which starred and was co-written and directed by Tom Hanks. Hanks also served as an executive producer on The Pacific, in which Seda starred. In 2013, Seda starred alongside Sylvester Stallone, Christian Slater, and Jason Momoa in the Walter Hill-directed action thriller Bullet to the Head.

In 2012, Seda began portraying Detective Antonio Dawson in Dick Wolf’s Chicago franchise, first starring in Chicago Fire in a recurring role and then, in 2014, as part of the main cast of the spin-off Chicago P.D. In 2017, Seda carried his role over into another spin-off, Chicago Justice, which was canceled after its first season. His daughter Haley made a guest appearance on Chicago P.D. as a key witness in a bombing. In July 2017, it was announced that Seda would return to Chicago P.D. following the cancellation of Chicago Justice. On April 19, 2019, it was reported that NBC/Wolf Entertainment officials informed Seda that they would not be renewing his contract, which led to his leaving the series shortly after six seasons.

In 2020, Seda was cast in the lead role of Dr. Benjamine Glass in the pilot of the NBC apocalyptic drama series La Brea, written by David Appelbaum. With the COVID-19 pandemic disrupting production of the pilot, NBC allowed Seda's contract to expire along with most of the other pilot cast members. However, with the pilot being picked up straight-to-series in January 2021, Seda returned to the show, with his character rewritten as Dr. Sam Velez.

== Personal life ==
Seda married his longtime girlfriend, Lisa Gomez, in 2000. The couple have two children.

== Filmography ==
=== Films ===
Year	Title	Role
1992	Gladiator	Romano Essadro
1992	Zebrahead	Vinnie
1993	Carlito's Way	Dominican
1993	New York Cop	Mario
1994	I Like It Like That	Chino Linares
1995	12 Monkeys	Jose
1995	Boys on the Side	Pete
1996	Dear God	Handsome
1996	The Sunchaser	Brandon 'Blue' Monroe
1996	Primal Fear	Alex
1997	The Price of Kissing	Billy
1997	Selena	Chris Pérez
2000	Price of Glory	Sonny Ortega
2000	Little Pieces	Kyle
2001	Double Bang	Sally 'Fish' Pescatore
2001	Love the Hard Way	Charlie
2002	Undisputed	Jesus 'Chuy' Campos
2002	King Rikki	Rikki Ortega
2003	Bad Boys II	Roberto
2007	One Long Night	Richard
2011	Larry Crowne	Officer Diamond
2012	Bullet to the Head	Louie Blanchard
2018	Canal Street	Detective Mike Watts

=== Television ===
Year	Title	Role	Notes
1993	Daybreak	Payne	TV movie
1994	NYPD Blue	Sal Molina	Episode: "You Bet Your Life"
1995	Under Fire	Unknown role	Unknown episodes
1995	New York Undercover	Bobby Lunas	Episode: "Knock You Out"
1996	Mistrial	Eddie Rios	TV movie
1997, 2003	Oz	Dino Ortolani	4 episodes
1997–1999	Homicide: Life on the Street	Detective Paul Falsone	Guest (Season 5), main role (Seasons 6–7)
1997	Law & Order	Detective Paul Falsone	Episode: "Baby, It's You"
1999–2000	Third Watch	Matty Caffey	Recurring role
2000	Thin Air	Luis DeLeon	TV movie
2000	Homicide: The Movie	Detective Paul Falsone	TV movie
2000	Good Guys/Bad Guys		TV movie
2001–2002	UC: Undercover	Jake Shaw	Main role
2003	Hack	Nick Duarte	Episode: "Dial 'O' for Murder"
2004	Las Vegas	Junior Gomez	Episode: "Die Fast, Die Furious"
2004	The Jury	Victor Torres	Episode: "Last Rites"
2004–2005	Kevin Hill	Damian 'Dame' Ruiz	Main role
2006	Ghost Whisperer	John Gregory	2 episodes
2006–2007	Close to Home	Ray Blackwell	Main role
2008	CSI: Miami	Hector Salazar	Episode: "Tipping Point"
2009	House	Donny	Episode: "Brave Heart"
2009	One Hot Summer	Ariel Silva	TV movie
2009	Legally Mad	Joe Matty	unaired pilot
2010	Cutthroat	Frankie	TV movie
2010	Numb3rs	Lonnie Moses	Episode: "Arm in Arms"
2010	The Pacific	Sergeant John Basilone	Miniseries
2010	Burn Notice	Cole	Episode: "Center of the Storm"
2010	The Closer	Detective Frank Verico	Episode: "Off the Hook"
2010	Hawaii Five-0	Sergeant Cage	Episode: "Mana'o"
2011–2013	Treme	Nelson Hidalgo	Main role (Seasons 2–4)
2012–2019	Chicago Fire	Antonio Dawson	Recurring role
2014–2019	Chicago P.D.	Antonio Dawson	Main role (Seasons 1–4, 5–6), guest (season 4)
2016	Law & Order: Special Victims Unit	Antonio Dawson	Episode: "Nationwide Manhunt"
2017	Chicago Justice	Antonio Dawson	Main role
2021–2024	La Brea	Dr. Sam Velez	Main role

== See also ==
- List of Puerto Ricans
