= To Selena, With Love =

2012 nonfiction book

- Author: Chris Pérez
- Subject: Selena; Chris Pérez
- Genre: Biography
- Publisher: Celebra
- Publication date: March 6, 2012
- Pages: 320

To Selena, With Love (Spanish: Para Selena, Con Amor) is a 2012 book on the relationship and life of American singer Selena and her guitarist husband Chris Pérez. Written 17 years after Selena's death, Pérez describes their relationship from how they met, their marriage, and struggles along with Selena's success as an entertainer and fashion designer up until her death in 1995. Pérez also debunks rumors about Selena being pregnant when she died, misconceptions about her murder, and her relationship with her family.

In 2016, Selena's father and manager Abraham Quintanilla, sued Pérez over a tentative television series based on the book. Abraham believed it violated a contract Pérez signed following Selena's death that gave Abraham the rights to Selena's likeness and image. Pérez countersued, believing he signed the contract at a vulnerable moment of his life. The case was dismissed by a Nueces County judge in September 2021. Pérez revealed that the matter was amicably resolved between him and Abraham.
