= Resurrection (Chris Pérez album) =

Studio album by Chris Pérez Band
- Released: May 18, 1999
- Recorded: 1998–1999
- Genre: Latin, rock
- Length: 63:19
- Label: Hollywood Records
- Producer: Julian Raymond

Chris Pérez Band chronology
Resurrection (1999)	Una Noche Más (2002)

Resurrection is the debut studio album by Chris Pérez Band. It was released on May 18, 1999. The album is based on songs that Selena, his deceased wife, inspired Perez to write after her death. The song, "Best I Can", was specifically written by Perez to his wife, Selena. Overall Perez revealed that the songs in the album are dedicated to her. At the 2000 Grammy Awards it won the Grammy Award for Best Latin Rock/Alternative Album. In 2002, Chris Pérez Band made their final album called Una Noche Más.

== Track listing ==
No.	Title	Length
1.	"Resurrection"	3:29
2.	"Noches En Vela"	4:03
3.	"Best I Can"	4:29
4.	"Solo Tu"	3:53
5.	"Refugio"	4:00
6.	"Porque Te Fuiste"	3:54
7.	"Solo Otra Vez"	3:08
8.	"Annie"	2:31
9.	"Agua Benita"	5:18
10.	"Vienes O Vas"	3:03
11.	"Master Plan"	4:02
12.	"Another Day"	4:14
13.	"Lava Caliente"	3:21
14.	"Shelter"	4:00
15.	"Alone Again Or"	9:54
