= Abraham Quintanilla =

American singer and talent manager (1939–2025)

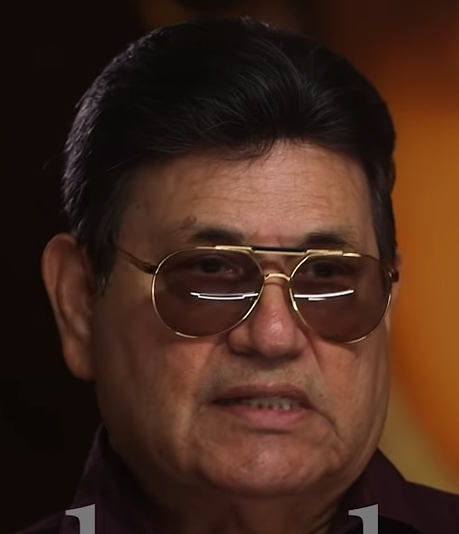
- Quintanilla in 2020

Background information
- Born: Abraham Isaac Quintanilla Jr. February 20, 1939; Corpus Christi, Texas, U.S.
- Died: December 13, 2025 (aged 86) Corpus Christi, Texas, U.S.
- Genres: Chicano, doo-wop, Tejano
- Occupations: Guitarist; singer; songwriter; A&R; producer; music executive
- Instrument: Guitar
- Years active: 1956–2025
- Labels: Falcon Records, J.W. Fox, Bernal, Epitome
- Formerly of: Los Dinos, Southern Pearl
- Spouse: Marcella Ofelia Samora (m. 1963)
- Website: q-productions.com

Abraham Isaac Quintanilla Jr. (February 20, 1939 – December 13, 2025) was an American singer, songwriter, guitarist, and record producer. He was the father and manager of Tejano singer Selena. After Selena's murder on March 31, 1995, Abraham devoted himself to safeguarding and promoting Selena's image through a variety of initiatives. The Quintanilla family has been subjected to public criticism by some fans and journalists who have raised reservations about the commodification of Selena's image, particularly regarding her posthumous releases. Abraham initially found such criticisms hurtful, though stated that he became numb following years of negative comments, saying that it no longer bothered him.

Quintanilla was born to a Mexican-American family in Corpus Christi, Texas. He began his music career as a member of the singing group the Dinos in 1956. He left the group in the late 1960s and initially retired from music to raise a family. After discovering Selena's singing talent, he created the band Selena y Los Dinos composed of Selena and her two older siblings, A.B. Quintanilla and Suzette Quintanilla. Under his management, the group became a major success in the Tejano genre.

Abraham was an executive producer of a 1997 biographical film about Selena's life, in which he was portrayed by actor Edward James Olmos. He participated in the development of Selena: The Series (2020–21) on Netflix alongside the Selena y Los Dinos (2025) documentary.

In May 2016, Abraham appointed Suzette as his successor and the chief executive of his Q-Productions studios.

== Life and career ==
=== 1939–1969: Early career with Los Dinos ===
Abraham Isaac Quintanilla Jr. was born on February 20, 1939, in Corpus Christi, Texas, to Abrán Quintanilla Sr., an auto body repairer and home painter, and María Calderón (1919–1972). Abrán and María eventually became known as Abraham and Mary, respectively, in their community. Abraham was the firstborn child of seven children born to Abraham and Mary, and grew up as a Catholic. He grew up in a community characterized by informal racial segregation, where Spanish was spoken at home and English in school, navigating between the distinct social worlds of Spanish-speaking Mexican Americans and English-speaking White Americans in South Texas. Abraham's childhood marked a transitional period for Mexican Americans, as their social standing improved significantly following World War II, when returning Mexican American soldiers, having experienced greater equality among Americans from other regions of the United States, refused to accept second-class citizenship in their hometowns; consequently, Mexican Americans began winning school board positions and other public offices for the first time. In 1953, Abraham and Mary left the Catholic Church to become Jehovah's Witnesses. They were among the early pioneers in the broader movement of Latin Americans departing Catholicism for Protestant denominations.

Around this time, 14-year-old Abraham developed an interest in music and formed a singing group called the Gumdrops with two members of his high school choir. His fascination deepened after attending a Y dance in 1957, where he heard a trio called the Dinos performing English-language songs. The group—composed of Bobby Lira, Seferino Perales, and Lupe Barrera, students at Roy Miller High School. A few months later, upon learning that Barrera planned to leave the group, Abraham approached Lira and Perales about joining as his replacement. He began practicing after school, performing at parties, and soon became the third member of the Dinos. The Dinos performed without pay until they received a tip at a graduation party. Following this, Abraham proposed that the group begin charging for their performances, a suggestion that initially met resistance from Lira and Perales, who feared that audiences would refuse to pay and the group would lose opportunities to perform. Their perspective changed, however, once patrons proved willing to compensate them, leading Lira and Perales to advocate for increasing their performance fee. In 1957, 18-year-old Abraham left high school to pursue a music career. Mary strongly disapproved of Abraham's music career. The Dinos soon expanded to include pianist Joe Robles and bassist Tony Gallardo, later joining forces with an instrumental group called the Jesters, whom they had met at a talent show. Initially, the Dinos focused on performing traditional pop music in the style of The Four Aces and the Mills Brothers before embracing the doo-wop trend that was gaining popularity among teenagers. According to biographer Joe Nick Patoski, Abraham's involvement with the Dinos brought him a sense of attention, importance, and self-worth he had never previously experienced—an exhilaration, Patoski writes, that surpassed any effect of alcohol or drugs.

The Dinos recorded "So Hard to Tell" at Charlie Brite and West's recording studio in Corpus Christi, which was released as a single on J. W. Fox, a label owned by musician Johnny Herrera. Herrera first became acquainted with the Dinos after Lira, who delivered beer to Herrera's studio, encouraged him to listen to the group. Brite and West subsequently became the Dinos' managers, promoting the single on KEYS radio and booking performances across Corpus Christi, Kingsville, Woodsboro, and other towns in the Texas Coastal Bend. By 1959, "So Hard to Tell" had become one of the most-played songs on KEYS. Their follow-up single, "Give Me One More Chance", written by Teddy Randazzo, received extensive airplay in Corpus Christi and Houston. Although Brite estimated that the record sold 150,000 copies, Patoski considers this figure inflated. During the promotional cycle for "So Hard to Tell", the Dinos performed without pay; however, following the success of "Give Me One More Chance", which led to a surge in touring demands, Abraham began insisting that the group be compensated. While on tour, the Dinos encountered racial discrimination, including an incident in which a North Beach club owner paid them not to perform after realizing they were "Made up of Mexican kids". At another performance, the Dinos were forced to ride in the back of a bus and denied motel accommodations that were extended to other performers. Subsequent singles, including the original "Twistin' Irene" and two covers—"Ride Your Pony" and "A Lover's Holiday"—sold poorly.

In October 1961, Lira received his draft notice and reported to San Antonio for a physical. Abraham and Perales accompanied him, agreeing that if all three were accepted, they would apply for induction into the Army's special entertainment division. Lira failed the test, but Abraham received his induction notice the following month and was drafted into the Army. Initially, Abraham viewed military service as an opportunity to travel, though he spent most of his time stationed at Fort Lewis. During his service, he met Marcella Samora, and settled in eastern Washington, marrying on June 8, 1963. Shortly after Abraham's discharge from active duty, Marcella gave birth to their son, A.B. Quintanilla. Struggling to support his family while working as a fry cook at Denny's, Abraham decided to return to Corpus Christi, where he briefly worked as a deliveryman before resuming his musical career with the Dinos. Their first performance following his return in Sinton, Texas—before an audience largely composed of Mexican farm workers—was met with derision, prompting the band to leave the stage abruptly. By this time, musical tastes among Mexican audiences had shifted from English-language pop and rock music, which had been popular before Abraham's military service, to Spanish-language music. Because the Dinos did not know any Mexican music, the club owner refunded the audience, and sheriff's deputies escorted the band from angry patrons. At the encouragement of Herrera, they transitioned to Spanish-language music and became Los Dinos.

Los Dinos recorded "Con Esta Copa", a composition offered by Herrera as an introduction to Spanish-language music. Distributed through Herrera's Epitome Records, the single received airplay on Spanish-language radio stations across Texas, Arizona, California, and Chicago. Following the success of "Con Esta Copa", Abraham later remarked, "From that time on, we did Chicano music." Unable to finance a full album, Herrera advised the group to sign with Arnaldo Ramirez's Falcon Records, which released their first Spanish-language album, Con Esta Copa (1964). Although Herrera composed all nine tracks, his photograph appeared on the album's back cover alongside Los Dinos, a decision that infuriated Abraham. Herrera recalled, "Wherever [Los Dinos] went, the girls wanted [Herrera]." The deal with Falcon Records afforded Los Dinos greater exposure than ever before, as Ramirez oversaw one of the most extensive distribution networks in Texas. During this period, the band expanded its lineup to include a horn section featuring two trumpets, an alto sax, and a tenor saxophone, while Abraham assumed responsibility for bookings. After releasing three albums under Falcon Records, Los Dinos transitioned to Bernal Records, where they issued the Herrera-composed "La Tracalera" as their debut single. On June 29, 1967, Marcella gave birth to Suzette Quintanilla. The following year, Los Dinos released Los Dinos a Go Go, which Patoski described as showcasing the group's dual appeal at its strongest, blending elements of soul and R&B while maintaining a sound tailored to Mexican American audiences in Texas. By 1969, however, audiences had begun to dwindle and ticket sales declined. Abraham ultimately chose to leave the band to focus on supporting his family, while Los Dinos continued performing without him before ultimately disbanding in 1974.

=== 1970–1981: Life after Los Dinos, Papagayos ===
Abraham moved his family to Lake Jackson, Texas, where he worked for the Dow Chemical Company as a shipping clerk and tow motor operator. On April 16, 1971, Marcella gave birth to Selena Quintanilla. Although Abraham adopted a more conventional lifestyle and assured his family that his musical career was behind him, he continued to pursue his passion privately, often singing in his spare time. He began teaching A.B. to play the bass guitar, during which Selena, seeking attention, began to sing along. Recognizing her singing ability, Abraham later recalled, "I saw the continuation of my dreams." He subsequently carpeted and soundproofed the family's garage to create a rehearsal space and began playing music with his children. Abraham formed a band comprising his children: A.B. on bass, Selena as lead vocalist, and a visiting cousin from Arizona as the drummer. When their cousin's father demanded his return, Suzette was tasked as the drummer. Suzette expressed discomfort with drumming and was initially resistant to participating, often fighting against it. Although initially unenthusiastic, the children participated regularly in rehearsals and performances. Suzette admitted that she harbored a long-standing dislike for performing as a drummer, having expressed her hatred for the role for many years. Abraham would entertain relatives with the band; the children frequently opposed it, prompting his brothers to advise him to ease up. Over time, however, the children learned to like playing music. Their first performance took place at a PTA meeting at Selena's elementary school.

Abraham instructed his children to remain open-minded toward a wide range of musical styles and introduced them to the gospel group the Imperials. As a result of this exposure, Selena developed an appreciation for African American music as well as the soft rock band Air Supply.

"Give Me One More Chance" (1984)
"Give Me One More Chance" was one of Los Dinos' signature songs in the 1960s. After the band's split, Quintanilla used it to work his daughter, Selena, into the music world. She recorded the song "Give Me One More Chance" for her début album in 1984.

In the summer of 1980, Abraham and Jim Serda opened up a Mexican restaurant called PapaGayo's (Parrots) and built a stage platform so his children could perform for the restaurant's patrons as they enjoyed their meal. The restaurant suffered from the recession of 1981 and was forced to close on March 1, 1981. In November, Abraham took his musical aspirations and relocated to Corpus Christi after his family was forced to sell their home to avoid bankruptcy. Selena y Los Dinos and their father performed at street corners, weddings, and any other social function that provided income for the family.

In 1984, Selena y Los Dinos were signed to Freddie Records. They recorded and released their début album entitled Selena Y Los Dinos. Selena was criticized by Freddie Martinez (CEO of Freddie Records) for being a young female in a male-dominated genre. Quintanilla transferred his children to Cara Records and released their second album, The New Girl in Town. This album led to Selena y Los Dinos' appearance as musical guests on the Johnny Canales Show.

By 1989, Selena had released eight long plays on Manny Guerra's independent labels, GP Productions and Record Producer Productions. These albums launched Selena's domination of the Tejano Music Awards, beginning in 1986. Selena's performance at the TMAs caught the eye of Jose Behar, the former head of Sony Music Latin. Behar signed Selena with Capitol/EMI. He later said that he signed Selena because he thought he had discovered the next Gloria Estefan.

Selena won the 1993 Grammy Award for "Best Mexican-American Album" for Selena Live!. Abraham opened his recording studio and talent-management firm, Q-Productions, in late 1993, while Suzette ran marketing for artists signed to the label.

Selena's 1994 album Amor Prohibido became the biggest-selling Latin album of all time. Amor Prohibido was certified 20× Platinum (Latin type) by the RIAA for selling over two million copies, and eventually sold over five million worldwide. Selena's sales and fan base increased and paved the way to achieve her dream of recording an English crossover album in prospective.

=== Death ===
Quintanilla died in Corpus Christi on December 13, 2025, at the age of 86.

== Death of Selena ==
On March 31, 1995, Quintanilla's youngest child, Selena, was murdered by the former president of the Selena Fan Club, manager of Selena's boutiques, Selena Etc. and former friend, Yolanda Saldívar.

Soon after Selena's death, Abraham Quintanilla and his family started The Selena Foundation, a charitable organization which assists children in crisis. Abraham Quintanilla appeared in numerous television specials about Selena. Quintanilla continued to produce new acts in the music and film industries with his record company, Q-Productions.

In the 1997 biographical film, Selena, Quintanilla was portrayed by Edward James Olmos while Quintanilla himself served as co-producer. In the 2020 Netflix miniseries Selena: The Series, he was portrayed by Ricardo Chavira. In 2021, Quintanilla released his memoir A Father's Dream: My Family's Journey in Music.

== Criticism ==
Selena's music teacher characterized Abraham as controlling, citing his refusal to permit Selena to perform Christmas carols due to their religious beliefs. The teacher further noted that although Selena informed her classmates that they were not allowed to sing "Happy Birthday" to her for the same reason, the class proceeded to do so regardless.

Former band member Mike Chavez described Abraham as an intensely driven stage father who persisted despite repeated setbacks and refusals. According to Chavez, Abraham defied considerable skepticism from music promoters, many of whom dismissed Selena as lacking talent and characterized his children's group as "just another band". Chavez maintained that Abraham exercised strict oversight of Selena's career, emphasizing discipline and propriety. Although he was often perceived as abrasive, difficult to work with, and prone to sudden outbursts, Chavez believed that Abraham's management ultimately safeguarded Selena's professional image.

In his 2012 memoir To Selena, with Love, Pérez recounted that Abraham reacted with alarm upon learning that he and Selena had been holding hands, confronting him directly and warning him not to disclose the conversation to Selena. In a later interview with Texas Monthly, Abraham acknowledged that he perceived Pérez as a potential threat, expressing concern that marriage might lead Selena to leave the band and undermine the years of effort invested in her career. Despite his objections, Selena and Pérez eloped in 1992 without Abraham's consent. He later stated that he ultimately accepted Pérez as a member of the family, recognizing that while each individual had their own life, familial ties remained intact.

On July 10, 1995, the Quintanilla family and Pérez signed a settlement agreement, granting Abraham executorship over Selena's estate, including rights to her likeness, business interests, properties, and assets. Abraham asserted that his children and Pérez lacked his depth of industry knowledge, claiming that without his leadership, the business would collapse. The remark was poorly received, prompting negative public and media reactions, with critics portraying him as overly controlling in familial and professional contexts. Suzette refuted claims that she was controlled by Abraham, which circulated in the media, asserting her independence and noting that she lived separately from her father, maintaining her own household and life.

According to The New York Times, some fans found Abraham to be a polarizing figure, perceived as headstrong and controlling, and at times accused him of manipulating Selena. Posthumous releases of the singer's works have received criticism from some fans, who allege that Abraham was seeking to profit from his daughter's career. In response, Abraham defended his actions in interviews, stating that he and his family were obligated to fulfill existing contractual commitments. In a 2021 interview, Abraham remarked, "For me, it became a business".

== Discography ==
- Con Esta Copa (1964) (as Los Dinos)
- Los Dinos a Go Go (1968) (as Los Dinos)

== Filmography ==
Film
Year	Film	Role	Notes	Refs.
1997	Selena		Executive producer	
1997	Selena Remembered		Producer	
Television
Year	Title	Role	Notes	Refs.
1995	Tejano Music Awards	Himself, receiving awards for Selena	TV appearances	
1998	American Justice: Selena: Murder of a Star	Himself	TV appearances	
1998	Behind the Music: Selena	Himself	TV appearances	
1999	Corpus: A Home Video for Selena	Himself	TV appearances	
2005	Don Francisco presenta	Himself	TV appearances	
2005	Selena ¡VIVE!	Himself	TV appearances	

== Works cited ==
- Arrarás, María Celeste (1997). Selena's Secret: The Revealing Story Behind Her Tragic Death. Simon and Schuster. ISBN 0-684-83193-7.
- Averyt, Libby (October 15, 1995). "Valdez vs. Tinker". Corpus Christi Caller-Times – via Newspapers.com.
- Cobo, Leila (April 2005). "Selena: The Legend, 10 Years Later". Hispanic. Vol. 18, no. 4. Gale 237040338 – via Gale Research.
- Falcon, Jaime-Paul (September 21, 2015). "Selena's Family Needs to Stop Tarnishing Her Legacy". Dallas Observer.
- Garcia, Ricky; Gamboa, Suzanne (March 15, 2022). "New digitally modified Selena music announcement gets mixed reviews online". Kxan.com.
- Hackleman, Esther (May 13, 2016). "MAC Unveils Its Selena Line". Corpus Christi Caller-Times – via Newspapers.com.
- Jiménez, Jesus (December 13, 2025). "Abraham Quintanilla Jr., 86, Dies; Music Producer Steered Daughter Selena's Career". The New York Times.
- Lister, Karen (July 16, 1995). "Excitement Builds for Singer's New CD". Corpus Christi Caller-Times – via Newspapers.com.
- McLemore, David (April 2, 2000). "Selena's Hold Remains Strong". The Dallas Morning News – via Archives.Dallasnews.com.
- Moreno, Sarah; Acosta, Andrea K. (December 13, 2025). "Abraham Quintanilla, father of music icon Selena, has died, family announces". KSAT.
- Patoski, Joe Nick (1996). Selena: Como La Flor. Little Brown and Company. ISBN 0-316-69378-2.
- Pérez, Chris (2012). To Selena, with Love. Penguin Books. ISBN 978-1-101-58026-4.
- Rice, Nicholas (December 13, 2025). "Selena Quintanilla's Dad, Abraham Quintanilla, Dies at 86". Yahoo! News Canada.
- Richmond, Clint (1995). Selena: The Phenomenal Life and Tragic Death of the Tejano Music Queen/Selena!. Pocket Books. ISBN 0-671-54522-1.
- Shawn Stockman (July 2, 2025). "Keeping Selena Alive, Suzette Quintanilla Opens Up On Selena's Tragic Passing, Legacy, & Upbringing". YouTube (Podcast).
- [TMZ] (December 13, 2025). "Selena Quintanilla's Dad Abraham Dead". TMZ.
- Valdez, Carlos (2005). Justice for Selena: The State Versus Yolanda Saldivar. Trafford Publishing. ISBN 9781412065252.
