= Selena: The Series =

American biographical drama streaming television series

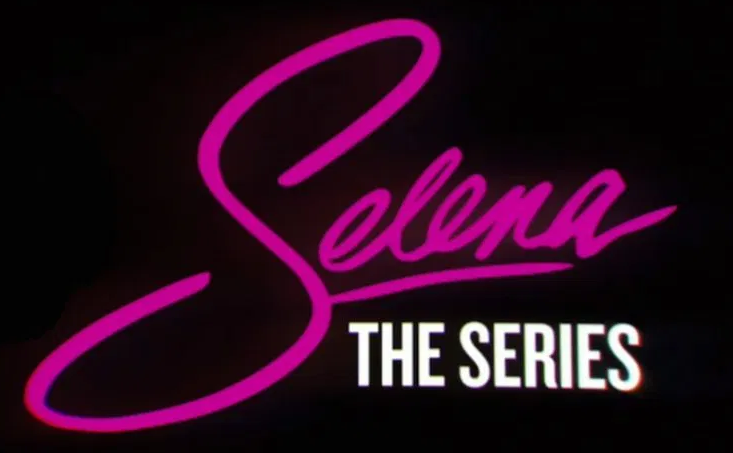
- Spanish: Selena: la serie
- Genre: Biographical; Musical; Drama
- Created by: Moisés Zamora
- Starring: Christian Serratos; Gabriel Chavarria; Ricardo Chavira; Noemi Gonzalez; Seidy Lopez
- Composers: Camilo Froideval; Dan Zlotnik
- Country of origin: United States
- Original languages: English; Spanish
- No. of seasons: 2
- No. of episodes: 18

Production
- Executive producers: Jamie Davila; Rico Martinez; Suzette Quintanilla; Simran A. Singh; Hiromi Kamata; Moisés Zamora
- Producers: Luisa Gomez de Silva; Lisa Matsukawa; Eddie Serrano
- Cinematography: Chuy Chavez
- Editors: Karen Antunes; Mario Monroy Nieblas; Joselito Martínez; Karina Espinoza Vázquez; Jose M. Martinez
- Running time: 32–40 minutes
- Production companies: Campanario Entertainment; Baja Studios

Original release
- Network: Netflix
- Release: December 4, 2020 – May 4, 2021

Related
- Selena's Secret (2018)

Selena: The Series (Spanish: Selena: la serie) is an American biographical drama television series created by Moisés Zamora. It tells the story of Tejano singer Selena Quintanilla Pérez's rise to fame and the sacrifices she and her family must make along the way.

The first season was released on Netflix on December 4, 2020. The second and final season premiered on May 4, 2021.

== Synopsis ==
The story of the Tejana singer Selena Quintanilla, from her childhood to her rise to fame, along with the difficult choices she and her family make to hold on to love and music.

== Cast and characters ==
=== Main ===
- Christian Serratos as Selena
  - Madison Taylor Baez as Young Selena
- Gabriel Chavarria as A.B. Quintanilla
  - Juan Martinez as Young A.B.
- Ricardo Chavira as Abraham Quintanilla
  - Brandol Ruiz as Young Abraham
- Noemi Gonzalez as Suzette Quintanilla
  - Daniela Estrada as Young Suzette
- Seidy López as Marcella Quintanilla
  - Aneasa Yacoub as Young Marcella

=== Recurring ===
- Hunter Reese Peña as Ricky Vela
- Luis Bordonada as Johnny Canales
- Paul Rodriguez as Roger Garcia
- Carlos Alfredo Jr. as Joe Ojeda
- Julio Macias as Pete Astudillo
- Gladys Bautista as Vangie
- Bryan Arion as Ray
- Jesse Posey as Chris Pérez
- Rico Aragon as José Behar
- Christian Escobar as Bill Arriaga
- Natasha Perez as Yolanda Saldivar

=== Guests ===
- Christopher Parks as Lee Ritenour
- David Barrera as Hector
- Oscar Avila as Manny Guerra
- Casey Tutton as Jilly
- Catia Ojeda as Laura Canales
- Mark Atkinson as Denny's manager
- David Fernandez Jr. as David Kramer
- Joe Lorenzo as Luis Silva
- Shauntè Massard as Whitney Houston
- Giovanna Bush as Young Beyoncé
- Marcela Guirado as Verónica Castro

== Episodes ==
=== Series overview ===
| Part | Episodes | Originally released |
|---|---|---|
| 1 | 9 | December 4, 2020 |
| 2 | 9 | May 4, 2021 |

=== Part I (2020) ===
| No. overall | No. in season | Title | Directed by | Written by | Original release date |
|---|---|---|---|---|---|
| 1 | 1 | "Daydream" | Hiromi Kamata | Moisés Zamora | December 4, 2020 |
The opening prologue is in 1994 when Selena performs a concert before thousands of fans in Chicago. The episode then moves to Selena's childhood in Texas, where her musically-inclined father Abraham decides to form a family band after hearing Selena sing. With Abraham's management and his wife Marcella's support, Selena and her siblings, Suzette and AB form Southern Pearl, a cover band that sings golden oldies. The family struggles through an economic recession and small gigs until they have a successful performance at a family friend's wedding, which encourages them to continue. At a carnival, Abraham sees a popular Tejano band and realizes that Tejano music has changed since his time in a band. He decides to revamp the family band and change their focus to Spanish-language music, forming Selena Y Los Dinos.
| 2 | 2 | "Dame Un Beso" | Hiromi Kamata | Moisés Zamora | December 4, 2020 |
In 1986, Selena Y Los Dinos has some success but still struggle financially. While Abraham gets them a new record deal, he encourages AB to take charge of the band, finding new members and getting new music. AB chases down songwriter Luis Silva but is disappointed when he refuses to give them a song. At Abraham's encouragement, AB starts writing new songs in collaboration with their new keyboardist, Rick. They record an LP and their song Dame un Beso is played on the radio, which thrills AB. However, Selena has to drop out of school and, although excited to design the band's costumes, feels that she's missing out on regular teenage experiences.
| 3 | 3 | "And the Winner is..." | Hiromi Kamata | Jessica Lopez | December 4, 2020 |
The family is excited when Selena Y Los Dinos are nominated at the Tejano Music Awards for Best Song and Female Vocalist of the Year; they lose the former, but Selena wins the latter. At the awards ceremony, Selena meets Laura Canales, who gives her advice to be who she is instead of who people want her to be. Abraham books an appearance at Johnny Canales' show, which would be Selena's first performance in Mexico, and she is determined to improve her speaking Spanish before then. The concert starts poorly when Selena opens with an English song, but improves when they switch to La Bamba. After the concert, Suzette, who has been feeling that her contribution to the band isn't significant, is touched to meet a young Mexican fan who wants to be a female drummer just like her.
| 4 | 4 | "Opening Act" | Hiromi Kamata | Claudia Forestieri | December 4, 2020 |
In 1988, Abraham buys a bus so the band can go on tour. After traveling through hot and cold weather in various states, Selena's voice starts to deteriorate. Arriving at Laredo, they find out that a nearby venue is trying to sabotage their gig. In order to help Selena manage her voice, they recruit an opening act, Los Bad Boys. The performance brings a full house and is visited by a CBS record producer, who gives Abraham his card. Abraham learns that their landlord wants to sell their house and, in expectation of closing a record deal, he buys their house and the two neighboring houses for the band. AB has a flirtation with a fan during a gig but afterward is intrigued by her sister, Vangie.
| 5 | 5 | "Dulce Amor" | Hiromi Kamata | Eddie Serrano | December 4, 2020 |
Negotiations with CBS are still on-going, but at the Tejano Music Awards, Selena is approached by an EMI record producer, José Behar. Abraham meets José, who offers less money than CBS but will commit to a crossover English album. Abraham decides to sign the band with EMI, though they will be signed as "Selena", i.e. dropping the band's full name. AB and Vangie prepare to have a baby, and AB worries how touring will affect his family because Roger leaves the band due to family stresses. Abraham invites Los Bad Boys' members, Joe and Pete, to join their band, and AB tries to recruit a new guitarist, Chris Perez, who initially turns him down.
| 6 | 6 | "My Love" | Hiromi Kamata | Aaron Serna | December 4, 2020 |
The band start work on their first album with EMI. AB and Rick do the music, with AB pushing himself for fear that the record label will keep Selena but drop the band if the album does poorly. Selena and Suzette design clothes for the album cover, but are forced by EMI's stylists into an "exotic" look that the whole band hates. The band concedes to the label's creative decisions for now, and use their disappointment to record a Spanish cover of Sukiyaki. Encouraged by feedback at a listening party, Selena decides she wants to make her own clothing line. Chris Perez joins the band as their new guitarist, and sparks immediately fly between him and Selena.
| 7 | 7 | "Fideo" | Katina Medina Mora | Jorge Ramirez-Martinez & Pamela Garcia Rooney | December 4, 2020 |
It's 1989, and the band starts a new tour with their refurbished bus. AB is kept under pressure writing new songs for the next album, among them Baila Esta Cumbia. Selena wins Female Vocalist of the Year at the Tejano Music Awards for the third time in the row but remains frustrated that her band doesn't win with her. Selena and Chris spend time together and grow close, worrying Suzette that they'll get in trouble with Abraham. After a show, Selena and Chris share a kiss, but the next day agrees to stay friends because Selena doesn't want to lie to her father or get Chris fired from the band.
| 8 | 8 | "Gold Rush" | Katina Medina Mora | Brenna Kouf | December 4, 2020 |
Feeling listless over Chris, Selena has her hair cut very short, the day before her photoshoot for the cover of her second album, Ven Conmigo. In 1991, Selena records her first music video, for Buenos Amigos with Álvaro Torres. Ven Conmigo achieves Gold status and Buenos Amigos reaches number 1 on Billboard's Hot Latin Songs, but EMI pushes back Selena's English-language album until she can achieve Platinum with a Spanish-language album. During a private moment, Selena and Chris share another kiss and decide to keep seeing each other in secret. Selena asks Marcella when she knew Abraham was "the one", and she tells her how she took a chance with him.
| 9 | 9 | "Qué Creías" | Katina Medina Mora | Henry Robles | December 4, 2020 |
At a performance in Eagle Pass, a fight breaks out in the crowd, and Selena is grabbed by a fan. Marcella asks Abraham to look into security options, and Abraham hires a friend as a bodyguard. With Selena's increasing popularity, José advises Abraham to start a fan club to manage her fan mail, merchandise, and activities; Abraham has Suzette contact Yolanda Saldívar, a fan who has volunteered to manage the fan club for free. Pete announces that he's pursuing a solo career, but for now stays with the band and helps AB write Como la Flor. Suzette figures out that Selena and Chris are seeing each other, and is at first angry with them until she gets into a long-distance relationship and realizes how frustrating the situation is for them. Abraham accidentally sees Selena and Chris in a private moment and immediately kicks him off the bus despite Selena's protests.

=== Part II (2021) ===
| No. overall | No. in season | Title | Directed by | Written by | Original release date |
|---|---|---|---|---|---|
| 10 | 1 | "Como la Flor" | Hiromi Kamata | Moisés Zamora | May 4, 2021 |
It's 1992, and Selena's new song Como la Flor is a success, increasing presales for her third album and leading EMI to ask for a fourth. However, Selena is still sad about being apart from Chris, whom she's seeing in secret. A confrontation with Suzette makes Selena realize a solution to having to choose between family and love — Selena and Chris elope. But before they can tell Abraham and the others themselves, a courthouse clerk leaks the news and they learn about it through the radio. Selena and Chris decide to stay away for a few days so that tempers blow over.
| 11 | 2 | "Enter My World" | Hiromi Kamata | Moisés Zamora | May 4, 2021 |
Selena and Chris return and are reconciled with Abraham and the others, though there are still hurt feelings at not being included in the wedding. Abraham offers Selena and Chris the empty house next door; Selena privately wants to get their own place, but agrees to take the house. The band go on tour in Mexico for the first time, where Abraham convinces Selena and Chris to hide their marriage, primarily for the sake of her male fans. Selena agrees at first, but after the pressure of lying on a live taping of Verónica Castro's TV show and to a journalist, at the Monterrey concert she introduces Chris as her husband. The audience boos at first, but Selena's charming demeanor wins the crowd over.
| 12 | 3 | "The Call" | Hiromi Kamata | Henry Robles | May 4, 2021 |
In 1993 Abraham completes construction on a recording studio for his production company Q-Productions, using a garage he'd had since 1982. Selena is inspired by Abraham to build a boutique, and pushes through despite Chris and Abraham's initial concerns. Abraham tells Selena to engage Yolanda, who runs her fanclub, to help with running the business. AB is under pressure to complete a new song for Selena's live album, and after a pep talk from Abraham, figures out that La Llamada needs to be recorded with the whole band in the studio riffing off each other. The success of the live album has Jose offer Selena the long-awaited English crossover album, to be produced by Nancy Brennan of SBK Records, but for Selena solo, without the band. Suzette's boyfriend, Bill, proposes to her.
| 13 | 4 | "Itty Bitty Bubbles" | Hiromi Kamata | Brenna Kouf | May 4, 2021 |
Selena struggles to juggle her time between touring, boutique renovations and preparing for Suzette's wedding. She hasn't accepted the English-language album deal, fearing her family's response and unsure if she can handle being on her own. During a sound check for the Lo Nuestro Awards in Miami, Selena and the band freestyle a tune that becomes Bidi Bidi Bom Bom. After struggling with the boutique's contractors, Selena delegates a lot of the work to Yolanda to manage. Suzette and Bill get married, with Selena as her matron of honor and Yolanda as a bridesmaid. Selena tells Suzette about the deal and, with her encouragement, signs the contract.
| 14 | 5 | "Oh No" | Hiromi Kamata | Jorge Ramirez-Martinez | May 4, 2021 |
Selena is overwhelmed as she works on her English-language album, another Spanish-language album, and readies the boutique for opening. Nancy's assistant is surprised that Selena is handling all the work personally instead of through an assistant. Selena and AB record Techno Cumbia and Ya No for the Spanish-language album. Selena hires her cousin Debra to work at the boutique. Yolanda feels unappreciated by Selena after all the work she's done.
| 15 | 6 | "Lo más bello" | Hiromi Kamata | Claudia Forestieri | May 4, 2021 |
The album Selena Live! is nominated for a Grammy for Best Mexican-American album. The band film the music video for Amor Prohibido, which is to be the first single of the next album. Selena records a new song written by Ricky, No Me Queda Más, which she realizes was written about Suzette. While out with her family, Selena crosses paths with a young Beyoncé. Selena has designer Martin Gomez make her Grammy dress, and the pair decide to make a clothing line together. At the Grammy awards in New York, Selena wins, but in her speech forgets to thank Chris, which adds to his feeling neglected as she gets busier. Also at the awards Selena and Suzette are recognized by Whitney Houston, Gloria Estefan and Luis Miguel, which makes Selena realize she's a star.
| 16 | 7 | "Si una vez" | Katina Medina Mora | Eddie Serrano | May 4, 2021 |
After SBK Records listens to her recording of Captive Heart for the English-language album, Selena is told to get a vocal coach. Tensions worsen in Selena and Chris' marriage. AB gets more songs for Selena, among them from Diane Warren and Keith Thomas. Singing I Could Fall in Love reminds Selena of her of how she and Chris fell in love, and the pair reconcile. Jose tells Selena that she and the band are to make a live album from a concert for 60,000 people at the Houston Astrodome. Selena and Martin's fashion show is a success, but shortly afterward Selena receives a court notice for unpaid bills for the boutique.
| 17 | 8 | "Astrodome" | Katina Medina Mora | Moisés Zamora | May 4, 2021 |
Selena and Abraham separately confront Yolanda about payments not being made, but she insists on her innocence. Suzette sprains her ankle just before the Astrodome concert, forcing them to get a replacement drummer. Abraham investigates the boutique and finds evidence of Yolanda embezzling from the boutique and Selena's fan club. Abraham, Selena and Suzette confront Yolanda about the money, but Yolanda insists that she didn't do anything. Abraham threatens to go to the police if Yolanda cannot bring evidence of her innocence. The Astrodome concert is a success. Elsewhere, Yolanda buys a gun.
| 18 | 9 | "When All the World is Sleeping" | Hiromi Kamata | Moisés Zamora | May 4, 2021 |
Yolanda continues to try to contact Selena, insisting it was all a misunderstanding. After fans manage to get into Selena and Chris' house, they decide to move to a plot of land that Selena has picked for them to build a house and small farm. Selena also tells Marcella and Suzette that she and Chris are going to try for children. Late one night, Selena picks up a call from Yolanda. The next morning Selena goes to Yolanda, demanding missing financial documents that Yolanda claims are in her motel room. A motel cleaner hears a gunshot from Yolanda's room; Selena has been shot, and dies at the Corpus Christi Memorial Hospital. Abraham and AB rush to the hospital but are not able to see her before her death. Family, friends and fans mourn her death. A month later, Selena's English-language album Dreaming of You is released. Six months later, Suzette has taken up Selena's role giving talks at school and AB is touring with the Kumbia Kings. In the aftermath, her music continues to be celebrated.

== Production ==
=== Development ===
On December 11, 2018, Selena: The Series was ordered to series by Netflix. The series is produced by Campanario Entertainment with Selena's father (Abraham) and sister (Suzette), from a screenplay by Moisés Zamora for Netflix. It is based on the life of Selena, and is the version authorized by Selena's family, unlike El secreto de Selena, an unauthorized version by María Celeste Arrarás, which the family publicly condemned. Part one of the series was released on December 4, 2020. The second part of the series premiered on May 4, 2021.

=== Casting ===
The series stars Christian Serratos as the titular character. Deadline later reported that "Other cast members include Noemi Gonzalez (The Young and the Restless) as Suzette Quintanilla, Selena's sister and best friend, who learns to embrace her role as the first female drummer in Tejano music history. Seidy López (Training Day) will play Marcella Quintanilla, Selena's mother; and newcomer Madison Taylor Baez will portray a young Selena." Ricardo Chavira and Gabriel Chavarria were to play Selena's father and brother respectively. It was later announced the series would include Julio Macias, Jesse Posey, Hunter Reese, Carlos Alfredo, Jr., Juan Martinez, Daniela Estrada and Paul Rodriguez, Jr. co-starring in the series as the Quintanila family and various other important members of Selena's life. Macias plays Pete Astudillo, with Posey as Chris Perez, Peña as Ricky Vela, and Alfredo as Joe Ojeda. Martinez portrays a young A.B. Quintanilla, Selena's brother, with Estrada as a young Suzette Quintanilla, Selena's sister, and Rodriguez as Roger Garcia, a shy guitarist who was part of the group before Chris Perez became its guitarist. Additionally co-starring Johnny Jay Lee (NCIS: Los Angeles) and Fernanda Moya as the young man and woman respectively.

=== Filming ===
Filming began in early October 2019 in Baja California, Mexico in places such as Rosarito, Tecate and Tijuana. Christian Serratos revealed in an interview with the Los Angeles Times that she finished filming the show's second season under the health and safety protocols of COVID-19 in November 2020.

== Soundtrack ==
Selena: The Series Soundtrack

Soundtrack album by Selena
- Released: December 4, 2020
- Length: 68:49
- Label: Capitol Latin
- Producer: A.B. Quintanilla III

Selena chronology
| The Last Concert (2017) | Selena: The Series Soundtrack (2020) | Ones (2021) |

| No. | Title | Writer(s) | Producer(s) | Length |
|---|---|---|---|---|
| 1. | "Como La Flor" | A.B. Quintanilla | A.B. Quintanilla | 3:04 |
| 2. | "Dame Un Beso" | A.B. Quintanilla; Ricky Vela | A.B. Quintanilla | 3:53 |
| 3. | "La Bamba" | Beau Ryan | A.B. Quintanilla | 3:54 |
| 4. | "Quiero" | A.B. Quintanilla; Ricky Vela | A.B. Quintanilla | 3:13 |
| 5. | "Terco Corazón" | A.B. Quintanilla; Ricky Vela | A.B. Quintanilla | 2:50 |
| 6. | "Yo Fui Aquella" | A.B. Quintanilla; Ricky Vela | A.B. Quintanilla | 3:04 |
| 7. | "My Love" | Selena Quintanilla | A.B. Quintanilla | 3:48 |
| 8. | "Besitos" | A.B. Quintanilla | A.B. Quintanilla | 2:23 |
| 9. | "Sukiyaki" | Ricky Vela | A.B. Quintanilla | 2:59 |
| 10. | "Ámame, Quiéreme" | A.B. Quintanilla; Pete Astudillo | A.B. Quintanilla | 2:51 |
| 11. | "I Could Fall In Love" | Keith Thomas | A.B. Quintanilla | 4:39 |
| 12. | "Enamorada De Ti" | A.B Quintanilla | A.B. Quintanilla | 4:01 |
| 13. | "Baila Esta Cumbia" | A.B. Quintanilla; Pete Astudillo | A.B. Quintanilla | 2:54 |
| 14. | "Buenos Amigos" (featuring Álvaro Torres) | Álvaro Torres | A.B. Quintanilla | 4:44 |
| 15. | "Ven Conmigo" | A.B. Quintanilla; Pete Astudillo | A.B. Quintanilla | 2:28 |
| 16. | "La Carcacha" | A.B. Quintanilla; Ricky Vela | A.B. Quintanilla | 4:10 |
| 17. | "No Quiero Saber" | A.B. Quintanilla; Pete Astudillo | A.B. Quintanilla | 2:57 |
| 18. | "Yo Te Amo" | A.B. Quintanilla; Pete Astudillo | A.B. Quintanilla | 3:41 |
| 19. | "Qué Creías" | A.B. Quintanilla; Ricky Vela | A.B. Quintanilla | 3:35 |
| 20. | "Ámame" | A.B. Quintanilla | A.B. Quintanilla | 3:41 |
| Total length: | | | | 68:49 |

=== Commercial performance ===
Selena: The Series Soundtrack debuted at number 8 on the Latin Pop Albums chart, selling 1,000 album-equivalent units during the week ending December 10, 2020.

== Reception ==
=== Critical response ===
For part 1 of the series, review aggregator Rotten Tomatoes reported an approval rating of 32% based on 34 critic reviews, with an average rating of 5.35/10. The website's critics consensus reads, "Selena: The Series's affections are obvious, but by not probing deeper into Selena herself it fails to capture the woman behind the legacy, settling for just-another-retelling of the charismatic star's life instead of something more." Metacritic gave the series a weighted average score of 48 out of 100 based on 9 critic reviews, indicating "mixed or average reviews".

For part 2 of the series, review aggregator Rotten Tomatoes reported an approval rating of 14% based on 7 critic reviews, with an average rating of 4.42/10.

=== Audience viewership ===
On January 15, 2021, Netflix announced that the series was watched by 25 million households for the first 28 days after its debut.

== Awards and nominations ==
| Year | Award | Category | Nominee(s) | Result | Ref. |
|---|---|---|---|---|---|
| 2021 | Golden Reel Awards | Outstanding Achievement in Sound Editing – Episodic Short Form – Music | Max Cremona | Nominated | |
| 2021 | Imagen Awards | Best Primetime Program – Drama | Selena: The Series | Nominated | |
| 2021 | Imagen Awards | Best Actress – Television (Drama) | Christian Serratos | Nominated | |
| 2021 | Imagen Awards | Best Actor – Television (Drama) | Ricardo Chavira | Nominated | |
| 2021 | Imagen Awards | Best Supporting Actor – Television (Drama) | Gabriel Chavarria | Nominated | |
| 2021 | Imagen Awards | Best Supporting Actress – Television (Drama) | Noemi Gonzalez | Nominated | |
| 2021 | Imagen Awards | Best Supporting Actress – Television (Drama) | Seidy López | Nominated | |
| 2021 | Imagen Awards | Best Music Supervision for Film or Television | Lynn Fainchtein | Nominated | |
| 2021 | Skyline Performer Award | Best Performance in a TV Movie/ Mini Series | Madison Taylor Baez | Nominated | |
