= Selena Etc. =

Boutique and beauty salon (1994–2009)

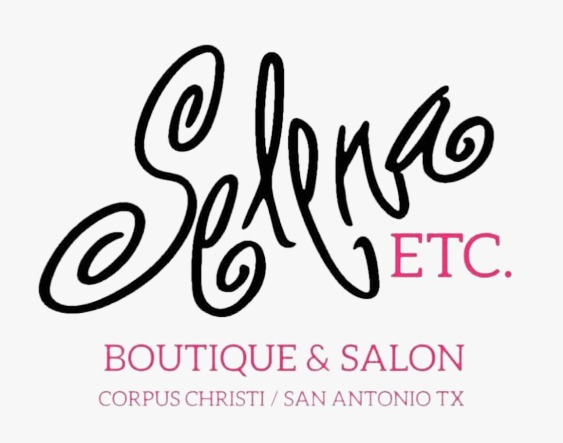
- Type: Clothing store hair salon nail salon
- Industry: Fashion
- Founded: Corpus Christi, Texas, U.S. (January 27, 1994)
- Founder: Selena Quintanilla-Pérez
- Defunct: July 1, 2009
- Area served: Texas
- Key people: Yolanda Saldívar (Former manager, 1994–1995); Sam Mariño (Former manager, 1995–2003); Kristal Sanchez (Former manager, 2003–2009)
- Products: Clothing hair products
- Owner: Selena Quintanilla Pérez

Selena Etc. was a South Texas-based boutique and beauty salon, which was founded and owned by the late American singer, Selena. Selena Etc. finished its building on January 27, 1994, in Corpus Christi, Texas, which was the headquarters.

Selena opened another boutique in San Antonio, Texas in October 1994. Both locations were equipped with in-house beauty salons.

Among the employees there was the president of her fan club, Yolanda Saldívar, who had been promoted to manager of her two boutiques, as well as controlling Selena's business checking accounts. However, she would lose this position after several employees began to approach Selena's father, Abraham Quintanilla, and they informed him that they had overdue payments on their payrolls, so upon initiating an investigation in this regard, Quintanilla was convinced that Saldívar was embezzling money.

On March 9, 1995, Abraham, Selena, and her sister Suzette confronted Saldívar and accused her of stealing money from the boutiques and the fan club, firing her immediately, although Selena continued to contact her because Yolanda had several financial documents in her possession that Selena needed to have back. Another boutique was planned to open in Monterrey, Mexico, in 1995, but on March 31 of that year, Saldívar would murder Selena by shooting her in the back after asking her to meet at the Days Inn motel in order to return her the financial records and documents she still had. After her death, Chris Pérez, Selena's widower, took over the business. The San Antonio boutique was closed sometime after 1999.

After the 15th anniversary of the opening of the Corpus Christi boutique, the store was officially closed as of July 1, 2009. A week after the store closed, Pérez placed a "for sale" sign in front of the building. The appraised price of the land and structure was USD91,454 according to the Nueces County Appraisal District. Perez' asking price for the property was $165,000. The Selena Etc. store had a full-service salon, as well as Selena memorabilia. They also sold jewelry, hats and other accessories. Soon after the foreclosure, due to the low economy, all merchandise and accessories began selling at the "Selena Museum", located several miles from where the Selena Etc. building once was.
