= Yolanda Saldívar =

Murderer of Selena Quintanilla (born 1960)

- Born: September 19, 1960 (age 66); San Antonio, Texas, U.S.
- Occupations: Nurse; fan club president; retail manager
- Known for: Murder of Selena
- Status: Incarcerated; parole denied; parole review scheduled in March 2030
- Conviction: Murder with a deadly weapon
- Penalty: Life imprisonment with possibility of parole after 30 years

Details
- Date: March 31, 1995
- Location: Corpus Christi, Texas
- Killed: 1
- Weapon: .38 Special Taurus Model 85 revolver
- Imprisoned at: Patrick O'Daniel Unit

Yolanda Saldívar (Spanish: [ɟʝoˈlanda salˈdiβaɾ]; born September 19, 1960) is an American former nurse who murdered singer Selena in Corpus Christi, Texas, on March 31, 1995. Saldívar had been the president of Selena's fan club and the manager of her boutiques, but she lost both positions a short time before the murder, when the singer's family discovered that she had been embezzling money from both organizations. In October 1995, Saldívar was found guilty of murder and sentenced to a prison term of 30 years to life. In 2025, she became eligible for parole. However, Saldívar's petition for parole was denied on March 27, 2025; her next parole review is set for March 2030.

== Biography ==
Yolanda Saldívar was born on September 19, 1960, in San Antonio, Texas. She was the youngest of seven children born to Frank and Juanita Saldívar. While growing up, she was teased and occasionally bullied at school because of her weight. She rarely made any friends and isolated herself from social activities. Her father was a head waiter at Jacala, a Mexican restaurant in the West End. She attended three different elementary schools in the Edgewood School district. Saldívar first attended Kennedy High School, then transferred to Holmes, followed by Jay High School, before graduating in 1979 from McCollom High School. While at McCollum, Saldívar belonged to the Junior ROTC. Few classmates do recall Saldivar, Ram Herrera a graduate of 1978 and Emilio Navaira a graduate of 1980.

Saldívar was accepted at the University of Texas in 1985, then transferred to Palo Alto College. She studied to be a registered nurse, and on December 10, 1990, received a Bachelor of Science in nursing from Texas A&M International University. At this time, she became obsessed with losing weight. She also began work as a graduate nurse at Medical Center Hospital. In March 1991, she received her license as a registered nurse from the Texas Board of Nurse Examiners and earned $60,000 a year. Saldívar, who married, had to work part time after adopting three children, one of them her niece.

Saldívar's employer, Faustino Gomez, a dermatologist, sued her for $9,200 that he said she stole from him starting in 1983. The lawsuit was eventually settled out of court. Within two months, Saldívar was back in court again when the Texas Guaranteed Student Loan Corporation obtained a Travis county court judgement in Austin against her for failing to repay a student loan of $7,361. At that time, Saldívar had switched jobs and was working as a nurse at St. Luke's Lutheran Hospital.

=== Selena fan club ===
Saldívar was a fan of country music. After attending one of Selena's concerts, she began repeatedly calling Selena's father, Abraham Quintanilla, about starting a fan club in San Antonio. Quintanilla eventually gave in to Saldívar's requests and she immediately became the club's president.

Saldívar was eventually promoted as manager of Selena's clothing boutiques, Selena Etc. By 1993, the fan club had reached 1,500 members in less than four years, and eventually grew to over 5,000. It became one of the largest fan clubs in the San Antonio area.

== Murder of Selena ==
In early 1995, Selena's family discovered that Saldívar had been embezzling money from both the fan club and boutiques, which led to her getting fired in the first week of March. On the morning of March 31, Selena agreed to meet Saldívar at a Days Inn motel in Corpus Christi to retrieve financial records that Saldívar had been refusing to turn over. Saldívar delayed the handover by claiming she had been raped in Mexico. Selena drove Saldívar to a local hospital, where they were told that the gynecological exam was to be done elsewhere, because the assault had allegedly happened in another country.

They returned to the motel, where Selena once more demanded the records. Saldívar then took a .38 Taurus Model 85 revolver from her purse and fired a hollow-point bullet, hitting Selena in the back. Selena ran towards the lobby for help; Saldívar chased after her, calling her a "bitch".

Following the shooting, Selena was rushed to the Corpus Christi Memorial Hospital and was pronounced dead at 1:05 pm. Saldívar was arrested that evening after a 9½ hour standoff with Corpus Christi police officers. During this standoff, Yolanda barricaded herself in a red GMC pickup truck and threatened to kill herself.

== Trial and imprisonment ==
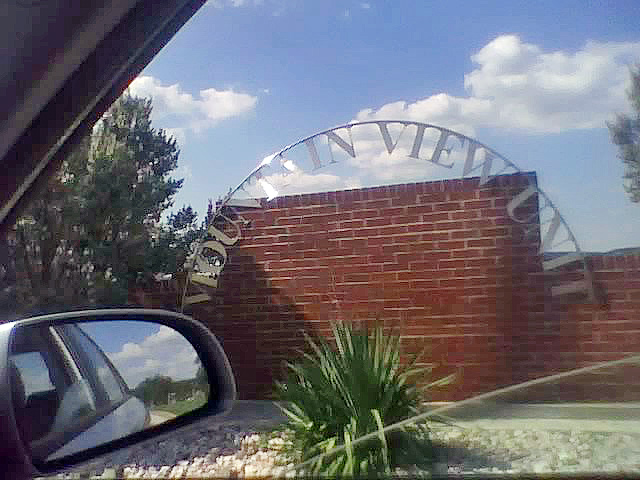
The Mountain View Unit, now Patrick O'Daniel Unit, where Saldívar is being held

Saldívar's trial for the murder of Selena was followed closely by the Latino community in the United States. The trial was not televised, but cameras were permitted on the courthouse premises. The venue was moved to Houston, Texas, after Saldívar's lawyers successfully argued that she could not receive a fair trial in Selena's hometown.

The State vs. Yolanda Saldivar was spearheaded by Douglas Tinker, who was appointed as the Outstanding Criminal Defense Lawyer of 1995. Before the start of the trial, CNN reported that prosecutors were expected to introduce a controversial police confession signed by Saldívar in which she said she shot Selena "during an argument over accusations from the singer's father that Saldívar stole money from Selena's accounts". The defense was expected to introduce testimony from Texas Ranger Robert Garza that "he overheard Saldívar claim the shooting was accidental, and that she objected when police failed to include it in her statement".

Saldívar tried to claim she brought the revolver to kill herself. The defense attorney had argued that the shooting was accidental, still the prosecution pointed out that Saldivar did not call 911 or try to help Selena after she was shot though she had been a registered nurse. Additionally, during an interview with the New York Post relatives of Saldivar stated that the shooting was in fact intentional.

On Monday, October 23, 1995 panel members consisting of six men and women -- made up of seven whites, four Latinos and one black--took three hours before finding Saldivar guilty. Three days later, on October 26, she was sentenced to 30 years to life; this was the maximum prison term allowed in Texas at the time. On November 22, 1995, she arrived at the Gatesville Unit (now the Christina Melton Crain Unit) in Gatesville, Texas, to be processed.

Saldívar was eventually transferred to the Mountain View Unit (now the Patrick O'Daniel Unit), also in Gatesville.

== After the conviction ==
The revolver used to kill Selena disappeared after the trial. It was later found in a box of office supplies at the home of court reporter Sandra Oballe, who has said she did not realize she had the weapon. Despite objections from some historical groups, one group offered to donate $100,000 to a charity if the gun was preserved, despite this; a judge ordered it be smashed with a sledgehammer, run through a shredder, and the pieces thrown into Corpus Christi Bay in 2002.

Saldívar has asked the Texas Court of Criminal Appeals to accept a petition that challenges her conviction. She claims the petition was filed in 2000 with the 214th District Court, but was never sent to the higher court. Her request was received on March 31, 2008, the 13th anniversary of Selena's death.

Saldívar first became eligible for parole in 2025 after serving 30 years in prison. Her first petition filed in January 2025 was denied on March 27, 2025, with March 2030 set as the next date for her parole review.

== In popular culture ==
Saldívar was portrayed by Lupe Ontiveros in the film Selena, by Damayanti Quintanar in Selena's Secret, a series based on the book of the same name, and by Natasha Perez in the Netflix original series, Selena: The Series. In 2017, Saldívar was portrayed by E. A. Castillo in the television documentary Murder Made Me Famous. Lastly, Saldivar was referenced heavily in the book “Justice for Selena: The State vs. Yolanda Saldívar,” which depicted the legal proceedings of Yolanda’s trial.
