= 1995 in Latin music =

This is a list of notable events in Latin music (i.e. Spanish- and Portuguese-speaking music from Latin America, Europe, and the United States) that took place in 1995.

== Events ==
- January 7 – Fonovisa, Global Records, and Sony Discos settle out of court after an infringement with Marco Antonio Solís and Los Bukis in December 1994.
- January 20 – The Los Angeles Police Department raided a piracy business in a San Fernando Valley area and confiscated 55,000 Latin music cassettes worth an estimated $500,000 (1995 USD).
- January 21 – The Latin music categories for the 37th Annual Grammy Awards are revealed. In addition, the National Academy of Recording Arts and Sciences introduces a new category for Latin jazz albums.
- January 28
  - The Mexican peso crisis sets off an uncertainty for Latin music, as regional Mexican music remained one of the biggest music genres and could have negatively affect Latin music as a whole. Due to the crisis, EMI Music Mexico began reducing stuff, becoming the first Latin music company to do so.
  - KAFY-AM (based in Bakersfield, California) and KELF-AM (based in Santa Barbara, California) were dropped from the Hot Latin Tracks reporting radio panels due to format changes.
- February 4
  - American executive and musician Jay Ziskrout forms Grita Records a label aimed at the Latin Alternative, or rock en español, market in the United States.
  - A report published by Billboard magazine showed that unsigned Latin music acts in Canada were easily selling thousands of copies, showing a correlation in Canada's melting pot cities Toronto, Montreal, and Vancouver.
- February 11 – Little Joe and La Mafia decided not to attend the 1995 Tejano Music Awards and spoke out against the organization for what they believed to be a faulty voting process.
- February 18
  - The rise of samba paulista sees a spike of interest among major record companies such as music club Bertelsmann Music Group, Polygram Records, EMI Brazil, Continental Records, and Sony Music Brazil.
  - Early estimates by Sony Music believed that the Brazilian music market would increase 10% in 1995 from 1994 sales figures provided by the Associação Brasileira dos Produtores de Discos (ABPD).
- February 23 – At the 37th annual Music Business Association (NARM), Warner Music Group director of Latin music sales, Gustavo Fernández is awarded for Luis Miguel's Segundo Romance (1994) for best-selling Latin album.
- February 25 – The emergence of zumba music begins as music companies began marketing the genre.
- March 1 – The 37th Annual Grammy Awards are held at the Shrine Auditorium in Los Angeles.
  - Luis Miguel wins the Grammy Award for Best Latin Pop Performance for his album Segundo Romance.
  - Cachao wins the Grammy Award for Best Tropical Latin Performance for his album Master Sessions, Vol. 1
  - Vikki Carr wins the Grammy Award for Best Mexican-American Performance for her album Recuerdo a Javier Solís
  - Arturo Sandoval wins the Grammy Award for Best Latin Jazz Album for his album Danzón (Dance On).
- March 4 – The A-Z directory of the Hot Latin Songs chart debuts in Billboard magazine.
- March 17 – The first annual Chilean Music Awards ceremony is held in the Chile de Santiago Stadium. Andean band Illapu won the most awards including Song of the Year, Best Group, and Best-selling Chilean Album of the Year.
- March 31
  - American Tejano performer Selena is shot and killed by Yolanda Saldívar, her friend and former manager of the singer's boutiques. The impact of the singer's death had a negative impact on Latin music, her genre—which she catapulted it into the mainstream market—suffered and its popularity waned following Selena's death. It was called an end of an era, as the Tejano market's "golden age" ended and never recovered.
  - Following Selena's death, the US state of Texas cancels all concerts that were scheduled for that day.
  - American regional Mexican music television host Johnny Canales marries his wife Nora.
- April 1 – Beginning with the April 1, 1995 issue of Billboard magazine, the weekly column of Latin music called "Latin Notas" began incorporating a column dedicated to the Music of Chile spearheaded by Pablo Marquez of the El Mercurio.
- April 4 – American disc jockey Howard Stern jokes about Selena's murder, burial, and mourners, and criticizes her music, saying "Spanish people have the worst taste in music. They have no depth." He then plays Selena's songs with gunshot noises in the background. After an arrest warrant for disorderly conduct was issued for him, Stern made an on-air statement, in Spanish. The League of United Latin American Citizens found Stern's apology unacceptable and urged a boycott of his show.
- April 8
  - Jose Antonio Eboli succeeds Jorge Undurraga as general manager of Sony Music Chile.
  - Sergio Fasanelli establishes Argentine indie label Disco Milagrosos, aimed at the Latin metal market.
- April 15 – Rodolfo Castro, Danny Barrocas, Gustavo Méndez, and Anthony Gonzalez founded Miami indie label Radio Vox, releasing its first maxi single by Fulano de Tal titled "Revolucion".
- April 29 – Selena becomes the first Hispanic artist to have five charting titles on the Billboard 200 chart simultaneously.
- May 18 – The 7th Lo Nuestro Awards:
  - Selena posthumously wins four awards, becoming the biggest winner. A tribute is held in honor of Selena.
- June 5-7: The sixth annual Billboard Latin Music conference took place.
  - The second annual Billboard Latin Music Awards is also held on June 7. Selena becomes the most awarded artist of the award ceremony, receiving four award posthumously including Hot Latin Tracks Artist of the Year. She is also posthumously inducted into the Billboard Latin Music Hall of Fame.
- July 18 - Dreaming of You, the crossover album Selena was working on at the time of her death, was released. On the day of its availability, 175,000 copies were sold in the U.S.—a record for a female vocalist—and 331,000 copies sold in its first week. It debuted at number one on the Billboard 200 chart, becoming the first predominately Spanish-language album to do so.
- November 24–26 – ShowMarket holds the first trade fair in Barcelona, Spain to focus on Latin music and relations among the Spanish- and Portuguese-speaking markets in Latin America, Europe, and the United States.

== Bands formed ==
- Angel (electro-Latin)
- Dos Almas (Latin jazz)
- Llamame "Yanko" (Cuban salsa)
- Grupo Raça (samba paulista)
- Os Morenos (samba paulista)
- Ginga Pura (samba paulista)
- Grupo Tempero (samba paulista)
- Adryana Ribeiro (samba paulista)
- Freddie Ravel of Earth, Wind & Fire begins his short venture in Latin music (Latin fusion)
- Los Filis (zumba music)
- Caribbean Jazz Project (Latin jazz)
- Pez (Latin psychedelic/progressive)
- Verde (Latin metal/thrash)
- No Demuestra (Argentine punk)
- Bobby Pulido (Tejano)
- Grupo Limite (Tejano)
- Jennifer Pena (Tejano)
- Enrique Iglesias (Latin pop)
- Donato y Estefano (Latin pop)
- Millie
- Ilegales
- Jailene Cintrón
- Mayra Mayra

== Bands reformed ==
- Djavan (on hiatus in 1991)
- Myriam Hernandez (on hiatus in 1994)

== Bands disbanded ==
- Selena y Los Dinos (formed in 1980)

== Bands on hiatus ==
- Arizita (on hiatus until 1996)

== Number-ones albums and singles by country ==
- List of number-one albums of 1995 (Spain)
- List of number-one singles of 1995 (Spain)
- List of number-one Billboard Top Latin Albums of 1995
- List of number-one Billboard Hot Latin Tracks of 1995

== Awards ==
- 1995 Premio Lo Nuestro
- 1995 Billboard Latin Music Awards
- 1995 Tejano Music Awards

== Albums released ==
=== First quarter ===
==== January ====
Day	Title	Artist	Genre(s)	Singles	Label
24	Hecho Con Fernando	Angel Villalona			MERENGAZO RECORDS
24	Llamame "Yanko"	Guianko	Salsa		Soho Latino
31	Tras la Tormenta	Willie Colón and Rubén Blades	Salsa		Sony Tropical

==== February ====
Day	Title	Artist	Genre(s)	Singles	Label
7	Pampas Reggae	Los Pericos	Reggae-Pop	"Runaway" "Home Sweet Home"	EMI
18	Ansias	Lilly Ponce			
25	Taiyo Okoku	Freddie Ravel			
28	El Piano	Armando Manzanero y Sus Amigos			BMG U.S. Latin, RCA
Unknown Day	Pure Emotion	Chico O'Farrill and His Afro-Cuban Jazz Orchestra	Afro-Cuban Jazz, Bop	"Variations on a Well-Known Theme" "El Loco Blues"	Milestone

==== March ====
Day	Title	Artist	Genre(s)	Singles	Label
7	Una Vez Más	Barrio Boyzz	RnB Swing/Swing		SBK Records
7	Diez	Elsa García	Tejano		EMI Latin
7	Reencuentro	Alvaro Torres			EMI Latin
14	Fusion	Moises Y La Gente Del Camino			BMG U.S. Latin
14	Cuban Gold, Vol. 2: Bajo Con Tumbao	Various Artists		"Pare Cochero"	
14	The Best of the Gipsy Kings	Gipsy Kings	Flamenco	"Djobi, Djoba" "Moorea" "Quiero Saber" "Bem, Bem, Maria" "Bamboleo"	Nonesuch, Atlantic, Nonesuch, Atlantic
15	Pochi y Su Cocoband (1995)	Pochi y Su Cocoband	Cumbia, Merengue, Salsa, Soca		Kubaney
21	El Tiempo Es Oro	Paulina Rubio	Synth-Pop, Soft Rock, Dance-Pop		EMI Latin
25	Guitarras Hermanas	Lara & Reyes			Higher Octave Music
28	Reunion '95	Little Joe y la Familia	Tejano, Conjunto, Corrido, Ranchera, Cumbia, Bolero		Tejanos Discos International
28	Amor	Los Dinnos		"El Taxista" "Amor"	

=== Second quarter ===
==== April ====
Day	Title	Artist	Genre(s)	Singles	Label
4	Sola	Millie	Ballad, Vocal		Capitol/EMI Latin
4	Las Reinas Del Pueblo	Selena and Graciela Beltrán		"Como la Flor" "¿Qué Creías?" "La Carcacha"	
11	Para Mi Pueblo	Cornelio Reyna	Ranchera		RCA, BMG U.S. Latin
13	Lágrimas	Ramón Ayala y Sus Bravos del Norte			
14	Mi Corazon Lloró	Ritmo Rojo			Discos Fonorama
16	¿Dónde Estarás?	Industria del Amor	Conjunto, Mariachi		Ramex
16	Realidades	Los Bondadosos	Conjunto		Profono Internacional, Inc.
16	Damelo	Los Bravos del Norte de Ramón Ayala	Norteno, Ranchera		Freddie Records
16	Alberto Vázquez	Alberto Vázquez	Ballad		Musart
16	No Hay Nada Eterno	Los Invasores de Nuevo León			
16	Mi Acordeon y Yo	Ramón Ayala	Norteno, Ranchera		Freddie Records
16	Sabor a Chocolate	Banda Pachuco			
16	Poeta y Campesino	Román Palomar			
18	Mar Adentro	Donato y Estefano	Rumba, Ballad		Sony Latin
18	En Cuerpo Y Alma	Rey Ruiz	Salsa		Sony Tropical
25	Cuando los Ángeles Lloran	Maná	Pop rock		Wea Latina, Inc.
25	Con el Primero	Mayra Mayra	Merengue		BMG Music

==== May ====
Day	Title	Artist	Genre(s)	Singles	Label
2	Que Seas Muy Feliz	Alejandro Fernández	Ballad, Mariachi		Sony Discos, Sony Discos
2	Por Amor a Mi Pueblo	Marco Antonio Solís y Los Bukis	Bolero, Cumbia, Ranchera		FonoVisa
2	Otro Mundo	Intocable	Norteno, Tejano	"La Mentira" "Coqueta" "Parece Que No"	EMI Latin
2	Café con Aroma de Mujer	Margarita Rosa de Francisco	Mariachi		Musart
4	Jaliene	Jailene			
9	Para Todos los Gustos	El Gran Combo de Puerto Rico	Salsa		Fonovisa Tropical

==== June ====
Day	Title	Artist	Genre(s)	Singles	Label
1	Turn Me Loose	Steve Jordan	Tejano, Norteno		RCA International
6	Viva!	Ottmar Liebert	Flamenco, Latin Jazz		Epic, Epic Records Group
13	15 Éxitos con Tambora	Antonio Aguilar	Ranchera, Corrido		Musart Especial
20	Presumida	Banda Zeta			
20	Rey Azúcar	Los Fabulosos Cadillacs		"Mal Bicho" "Carmela" "Las Venas Abiertas de America Latina"	SDI, SDI
23	Mamonas Assassinas	Mamonas Assassinas	Pop rock		EMI, EMI
27	Se Pegó	Charanga de los 4			
27	Macarena Mix	Various artists	Latin, Hip-House, Merengue, Dance-Pop	"Macarena" "Macarena" "Macarena"	BMG U.S. Latin
27	Amor Sin Barreras	Los Tiranos del Norte			
Unknown Day	No Se Parece a Nada	Albita	House, Latin, Deep House		Epic

=== Third quarter ===
==== July ====
Day	Title	Artist	Genre(s)	Singles	Label
18	Por Derecho Propio	Tito Rojas	Salsa		Musical Productions
18	La Trampa	Ana Bárbara		"La Trampa" "Me Asusta Pero Me Gusta" "No Se Que Voy a Hacer"	Fonovisa Music Corporation
25	La Tierra del Olvido	Carlos Vives	Cumbia, Pop rock, Vallenato		EMI Latin

==== August ====
Day	Title	Artist	Genre(s)	Singles	Label
2	Ritmo y Candela: Rhythm at the Crossroads	Patato and Changuito y Orestes			
15	Sueño Stereo	Soda Stereo	Pop rock	"Ella Usó Mi Cabeza Como un Revólver" "Zoom" "Paseando por Roma"	BMG U.S. Latin, Ariola
15	Gisselle	Gisselle	Merengue		BMG U.S. Latin, MC Records, RCA
22	Loco Corazón	Giro	Salsa		SDI, Ray-Ban
22	Raza Odiada	Brujeria	Grindcore, Death Metal		Roadrunner Records
29	Tesorito	Angel	Salsa		DUR Music

==== September ====
Day	Title	Artist	Genre(s)	Singles	Label
6	...No Se Cansan!	Jaime y los Chamacos	Tejano, Conjunto		Freddie Records
12	Solo Para Ti	Mazz	Tejano		EMI Latin
26	Abriendo Puertas	Gloria Estefan	Salsa, Sonero, Rumba		Epic

=== Fourth quarter ===
==== October ====
Day	Title	Artist	Genre(s)	Singles	Label
3	Master Sessions, Vol. 2	Cachao	Afro-Cuban Jazz, Latin Jazz		Epic
3	En Vivo Desde El Carnegie Hall	Gilberto Santa Rosa	Salsa		Sony Tropical
7	Di Blasio Latino	Raul Di Blasio			
10	Amor	Jon Secada	Smooth Jazz, Rhythm & Blues, Ballad		SBK Records, EMI Latin
10	Vamo' al Mambo!!	Zafra Negra	Merengue	"Coqueta y Sabrosa" "El Negro Pintao" "Sufriendo Por Ella"	EMI Latin, J&N Records
16	Desenchufado	León Gieco	Folk Rock, Acoustic		Tropical Music
17	El Concierto	Luis Miguel	Ballad, Bolero, Mariachi, Dance-Pop		Wea Latina, Inc.
17	Virao	Los Cantantes	Merengue		Los Cantantes
24	The Voice	Jay Perez	Tejano		Sony Discos
24	El Dorado	Aterciopelados	Alternative Rock, Rock & Roll, Pop rock, Punk	"Florecita Rockera" "Bolero Falaz" "La Estaca"	BMG
27	Silvio	Silvio Rodríguez	Nueva Trova		Discos Fuentes
Unknown Day	La Carretera	Julio Iglesias	Romantic, Vocal, Ballad		Columbia
Unknown Day	Los Dueños del Swing	Los Hermanos Rosario	Merengue, Bachata		Karen Records
Unknown Day	En éxtasis	Thalía	Ballad, Merengue	"Piel Morena" "Amandote" "Gracias a Dios" "Maria la del Barrio"	EMI Latin
Unknown Day	A Medio Vivir	Ricky Martin	Europop, Ballad	"María"	Sony Latin
Unknown Day	De Corazón a Corazón	Pimpinela	Ballad, Vocal		Polydor
Unknown Day	Cuerpo a cuerpo	Sergio Dalma	Pop rock, Ballad		Mercury

==== November ====
Day	Title	Artist	Genre(s)	Singles	Label
2	Canciones de Amor	Los Rehenes	Cumbia		FonoVisa
21	Camino del Amor	Los Temerarios	Cumbia, Ranchera, Bolero		Afg Sigma Records
21	Como Te Extraño	Pete Astudillo	Tejano		EMI Latin
21	Ilegales	Ilegales	Latin, Hip-House, Merengue	"La Morena" "Fiesta Caliente" "A Que Te Pongo"	BMG U.S. Latin, Ariola
21	Reclmando nuestro espacio	Los Adolescentes			
Unknown Day	Joyas de dos siglos	Ana Gabriel	Ranchera, Bolero		Sony Latin
Unknown Day	Domingo	Titãs	Pop rock		WEA

==== December ====
Day	Title	Artist	Genre(s)	Singles	Label
1	Al Pie del Cañon	La Mona Jiménez			RCA, BMG Argentina
1	Chocolate Aqui	El Chocolate			
1	Todos Queremos Mas	Arlnal Gomez	Salsa, Bolero, Cha-Cha		Carib Musicana Records
19	En Tus Manos	Milly y los Vecinos	Merengue		Tropic Sun
Unknown Day	Pedro Fernández	Pedro Fernández	Mariachi		Mercury, PolyGram

=== Unknown date ===
Title	Artist	Genre(s)	Singles	Label
Big Bang	Enanitos Verdes	Pop rock		EMI
Vida	La Mafia	Tejano	"Me Duele Estar Solo" "Vida"	Sony Discos
La Diferenzia	La Diferenzia	Cumbia, Ranchera, Norteno, Conjunto		Arista Texas, Arista Texas
Gracias Mujer	Banda Machos	Cumbia, Norteno, Mariachi, Tejano		Fonovisa, Inc.
Mi Forma de Sentir	Pedro Fernández	Ballad, Ranchera	"Mi Forma de Sentir" "Bonita" "Vamos a Platicar"	Philips
Yo Vendo Unos Ojos Verdes	Ezequiel Peña	Ranchera		FonoVisa
Circo Beat	Fito Páez	Alternative Rock	"Mariposa Tecknicolor" "She's Mine" "Dejarlas Partir"	Not On Label (Fito Páez)
Antonio Brasileiro	Antônio Carlos Jobim	Bossa Nova, Cool Jazz	"So Danço Samba"	Sony Latin Jazz, Sony Latin Jazz
Mirandote	Frankie Ruiz	Salsa	"No Dudes de Mi" "Mirandote"	Rodven Discos
12 de Janeiro	Nando Reis	Pop rock, Folk Rock		Warner Music Brasil
Valentín Alsina	2 Minutos	Punk		Polydor
Huellas del Pasado	Grupo Niche	Salsa	"Gotas de Lluvia" "Lo Bonito y Lo Feo" "Se Me Parte el Corazon"	SDI
Euphoria	Ottmar Liebert	Flamenco, Downtempo		Epic, Epic, Epic
Rompiendo Barreras	Bronco	Norteno, Ballad		FonoVisa
Tesoro	Graciela Beltrán	Banda		EMI Latin
Sin Miedo	Caló	Euro House, Dance-Pop, Reggae-Pop		Mercury
Siete Mananas	Julian	Ballad		Wea Latina, Inc., Warner Music Latina
Atrevete	Tres Equis			Soho Latino
Éxitos En Vivo	La Mafia	Tejano, Norteno		Sony Discos
Arete	Eddie Palmieri	Latin Jazz, Salsa		TropiJazz
Soy el Mismo	Gary Hobbs			EMI Latin
Circo Beat	Fito Páez	Argentine Rock	"Mariposa Tecknicolor" "She's Mine" "Dejarlas Partir"	Not On Label (Fito Páez)
Hay Amores Y Amores	Rocío Dúrcal	Ballad		Ariola, BMG U.S. Latin
My Family	Various artists			
Es Mundial	El General	Reggae, Hip Hop, Merengue, House	"Las Chicas" "Amor de Pobre"	BMG U.S. Latin
El Ejemplo	Los Tigres del Norte	Norteno		Fonovisa
Arturo Sandoval & The Latin Train	Arturo Sandoval	Latin Jazz	"Be-Bop" "Martebelona"	GRP
Aunque Me Duele el Alma	Vicente Fernández			
El Ganador	Los Palominos	Tejano	"La Llama" "Tan Bien Que Estaba" "Nunca Me Olvides"	Sony Discos
Todo a Su Tiempo	Marc Anthony	Salsa, Vocal	"Te Conozco Bien" "Nadie Como Ella"	Sony Discos, Soho Latino
3	Alejandro Sanz	Acoustic, Soft Rock, Pop rock	"La Fuerza del Corazon" "Mi Soledad y Yo" "Quiero Morir en Tu Veneno" "¿Lo Ves?"	WEA Latina
Vamo Batê Lata	Os Paralamas do Sucesso	Pop rock		EMI, EMI
La Espada & la Pared	Los Tres	Alternative Rock		SDI, Columbia
Magia	Jerry Rivera	Salsa, Bolero		Sony Tropical
Mi Mundo	Marta Sánchez		"Arena y Sol" "Vive Cada Día"	Mercury
Dreaming of You	Selena	Cumbia, Ballad, Tejano	"I Could Fall in Love" "Dreaming of You" "Amor Prohibido" "Techno Cumbia" "Como la Flor" "Bidi Bidi Bom Bom"	EMI Latin, EMI
El México Que Se Nos Fue	Juan Gabriel	Norteno, Ranchera, Bolero		BMG U.S. Latin, Ariola
Invisible	La Ley	Pop rock		Wea Latina, Inc.
El Hombre Merengue	Kinito Méndez	Merengue	"Cachamba" "Pica, Pica"	J&N Records, EMI Latin
Avalancha	Héroes del Silencio			El Dorado
Pensativo	Jerry Gonzalez and the Fort Apache Band	Afro-Cuban Jazz	"Midnight Train" "Gonzilla" "Heidi Ho"	Milestone
Viene del Alma	Ricardo Montaner	Ballad	"Soy Tuyo"	EMI Latin
Dance Manía	Grupo Manía	Merengue		Bombazo Records
Mama Funk	Los Tetas			EMI

== Best-selling records ==
=== Best-selling albums ===
The following is a list of the top 10 best-selling Latin albums in the United States in 1995, according to Billboard.

Rank	Album	Artist
1	Dreaming of You	Selena
2	Amor Prohibido	Selena
3	The Best of the Gipsy Kings	Gipsy Kings
4	Segundo Romance	Luis Miguel
5	12 Super Éxitos	Selena
6	Live!	Selena
7	Entre a Mi Mundo	Selena
8	Mi Tierra	Gloria Estefan
9	Abriendo Puertas	Gloria Estefan
10	Las Reinas Del Pueblo	Selena and Graciela Beltrán

=== Best-performing songs ===
The following is a list of the top 10 best-performing Latin songs in the United States in 1995, according to Billboard.

Rank	Single	Artist
1	"No Me Queda Más"	Selena
2	"Fotos y Recuerdos"	Selena
3	"Tú Sólo Tú"	Selena
4	"Que No Me Olvide"	Bronco
5	"I Could Fall in Love"	Selena
6	"Una Mujer Como Tú"	Marco Antonio Solís and Los Bukis
7	"Nadie"	Bronco
8	"Mi Forma de Sentir"	Pedro Fernández
9	"Toma Mi Amor"	La Mafia
10	"La Media Vuelta"	Luis Miguel

== Births ==
- January 5 – Whindersson Nunes, Brazilian YouTuber and musician
- January 7 – Leslie Grace, American bachata singer
- January 12 – Nathy Peluso, Argentine singer
- June 23 – Danna Paola, Mexican pop singer
- September 25 – Sofía Reyes, Mexican pop singer

== Deaths ==
- January 19 – Patricia Teherán, 26, Colombian vallenato singer (car accident)
- March 29 – Carl Jefferson, 75, founder of Latin jazz label Concord Picante
- March 31 – Selena, 23, American Tejano singer (murdered)
- May 31 – Antonio Flores, 33, Spanish flamenco singer (suicide by drug overdose)
- July 19 – Tomás Méndez, 68, Mexican ranchera composer
- July 24 – Manuel Pareja Obregón, Spanish composer of Andalusian folk music
- July 25 – Osvaldo Pugliese, Argentine tango musician

== Sources ==
- Arrarás, María Celeste (1997). Selena's Secret: The Revealing Story Behind Her Tragic Death. Simon and Schuster. ISBN 0-684-83193-7.
- Patoski, Joe Nick (1996). Selena: Como La Flor. Boston: Little Brown and Company. ISBN 0-316-69378-2.
- Shaw, Lisa (2005). Pop Culture Latin America!: Media, Arts, and Lifestyle. ABC-CLIO. ISBN 1-85109-504-7.
- Untiedt, Kenneth L. (2013). Cowboys, Cops, Killers, and Ghosts: Legends and Lore in Texas. University of North Texas Press. ISBN 978-1-57441-532-2.
