= Latin music in Canada =

The introduction of Latin music in Canada began during the immigration waves of Hispanics into the country. The commercialization of Latin music emerged during the "Latin explosion" or "Latin invasion" of the 1990s after American Latinos began competing with Canadian recording artists and receiving music certifications issued by Music Canada. Since 1999, Latin musicians have gained popularity on radios, at nightclubs, music festivals, and appearances on television in Canada.

Latin music had its beginnings in Canada when Ferdinand Morton began touring the country as early as the 1910s. Tropical music became a popular genre among Canadians; singers Tito Puente, Willie Colón, and Rubén González popularized it in the country. Female salsa music singers such as Celia Cruz gained success in Canada after the rise of women in music genres dominated by men. Cuban pop singer Gloria Estefan, Spanish pop singer Julio Iglesias, and Tejano music performer Lydia Mendoza found success in Canada before the 1990s Latin music explosion.

During the Latin music invasion of the 1990s, singers such as Selena, Ricky Martin, Jennifer Lopez, the Gipsy Kings, and the Buena Vista Social Club were among the most successful Hispanics in Canada. Buena Vista Social Club's self-titled debut album became the best-selling Latin album in Canada, having been certified triple platinum by Music Canada. During the 2000s decade, Latin music acts from Canada were recognized as with Alex Cuba who won a Juno Award for World Music Album of the Year in 2006 for his debut album. Canadian singer Nelly Furtado was inspired by Cuba to record a Spanish-language album in 2009; her album Mi Plan peaked number 20 on the Canadian Albums Chart, becoming the highest-charting Spanish-language album ever recorded by a Canadian artist. The Latin Recording Academy, known for its annual Latin Grammy Awards, includes membership from the Latino community of Canada.

In 2026, the Juno Awards introduced a dedicated category for Latin Music Recording of the Year.

== Styles of Latin music in Canada ==
=== Canadian Latin music ===
The Latin music scene in Canada began with the immigration of Hispanic people in Toronto, Montreal, Quebec, and Vancouver. Because of the large immigration move to these cities, Billboard magazine called this a "huge potential" for the popularity of Latin music in Canada. It wasn't until the 1994 FIFA World Cup Final, where Hispanics took to the streets of Toronto dancing to Latin music, that inspired record companies to begin commercializing and marketing Latin music in Canada. The marketing of Latin albums began shortly afterwards with Sony Music Canada, Warner Music Canada, and Sunrise Records at select outlets. Shortly afterwards, Sunrise Records sponsored Viva¡ Musica, a four-night Latin music show on the Canadian TV channel TeleLatino. A report published by Billboard magazine showed that unsigned Latin music acts in Canada were easily selling thousands of copies by 1995. Since at least 1999, Hispanic artists have gained popularity at nightclubs, radio airplay, festivals, and TV appearances. Latin music albums were once only localized in Toronto and Montreal where music companies and shops exclusively marketed Latin music towards Hispanic consumers. They believed that in order to promote sales of Spanish-language albums among Canadians, Hispanics would be the first targeted group to build commercial success.

Canadian music group Criollo, who record a bahire-style of bachata music which they coined, began recording their style of bachata music in 2006. The quintet band took part in the Rhythms of the World Festival and the International Merengue Festival held in Montreal. Born in Cuba, Alex Cuba started off recording music after emigrating to British Columbia and formed the Alex Cuba Band there. The band's debut album in 2006 earned them a Juno Award for World Music Album of the Year. With the support of Cuba who helped in the writing process, Canadian singer Nelly Furtado released her first Latin album Mi Plan in 2009. Randy Lennox of Universal Music Canada informed Billboard that they would be treating the release of Mi Plan as a "major release" similar to the marketing strategy used with Furtado's English-language albums. The album debuted and peaked at number 20 on the Canadian Albums Chart.

=== Latin American music in Canada ===
The earliest Latin music musician who gained fame in Canada was Ferdinand Morton, who toured throughout Canada beginning in the 1910s and popularized Latin jazz in the country. Veteran musicians who later formed the Afro-Cuban All Stars in 1996, gained a following in Canada and brought Cuban salsa music to the country as early as the 1940s. Other tropical music recording artists such as the Company Segundo, Cubanismo!, Rubén González, and Los Mocosos, also became popular Latin acts in Canada. Female salsa singers were not popular in Canada until the 1980s and 1990s, when the male-dominated salsa genre saw the rise of women playing the role as singers rather than dancers or listeners. Celia Cruz became a popular salsa singer in Canada along with her male counterparts Tito Puente and Willie Colon. Cuban pop singer Gloria Estefan also established her popularity in the country as well as Julio Iglesias during the 1980s. Filmmaker Anthony Azzopardi documented the growing popularity of Latin music in Canada and released his findings in 1992's docu-film Latin Nights.

The earliest recorded history of Tejano music being played in Canada was from Lydia Mendoza, who performed at the Smithsonian Folklife Festival in 1971 in Montreal. Mendoza continued to perform in Canada, where in 1985 she played in front of large crowds at theaters and music halls. After Mendoza, Selena—who began dominating the Tejano music scene in America—was on the verge of crossing over into the American pop market and gained a following in Canada after her 1994 Amor Prohibido album was released. The singer was shot and killed on March 31, 1995. Her posthumously released album Dreaming of You (1995), peaked at number seventeen on the Canadian RPM Top Albums chart, and was certified gold by Music Canada that December.

The 1990s "Latin explosion" brought the genre to the mainstream market in Canada. Beginning in 1999, Latin American music recording artists began selling platinum-certified albums—sales in excess of 100,000 units—in Canada including Selena's greatest hits album All My Hits/Todos Mis Exitos (1999), Ricky Martin's self-titled album, Jennifer Lopez's On the 6, and Buena Vista Social Club's 1997 debut album. Buena Vista Social Club's self-titled album remains the best-selling Latin album in Canada, having been certified triple platinum for sales of 300,000 units. Canadian music shops began stocking Latin music albums due to the mainstream success of Martin and Lopez. Sales of Latin music among Canadian consumers increased substantially in 1999. Georgia Tsao, international marketing manager of Warner Music Canada, said that because of Martin's commercial success in Canada "there's not a language barrier anymore". Martin's success in that country "springboarded" English and Spanish-language releases of Latin albums by Marc Anthony, Elvis Crespo, Shakira, Julio Iglesias Jr., and Alejandro Fernandez.

By 2006, Ricky Martin sold 1.6 million copies in Canada alone. On November 6, 2010, Colombian singer Shakira's ninth studio album Sale el Sol became the singer's first Spanish-language album to impact the Canadian Albums Chart; peaking at number eleven. The album produced two top 40 singles, "Loca" and "Rabiosa".

=== Iberian Peninsula music in Canada ===
Spanish singer Enrique Iglesias moved to Toronto for six months while recording his debut studio album in 1996. Iglesias' ninth studio album Euphoria was released in July 2010 for which he embarked on a world tour that included Canada. The album was certified gold for sales in excess of 40,000 units.

According to musicologist Ilan Stavans, Canadians enjoyed the morna musical styles of Portugal.

== Noted Canadian artists ==
As the hispanophone community in Canada is still relatively small compared to English or French speakers, the genre's prominence in Canada still derives more from the popularity of established international artists than from Canadian artists; however, a burgeoning number of Canadian artists have recorded and performed in Latin genres. This includes both artists who perform exclusively in traditional Latin, Spanish or Portuguese genres, and artists who blend Latin influences with other pop, rock or folk genres.

- Eva Avila
- The Battle of Santiago
- Dan Bejar
- Fito Blanko
- Boogat
- Jane Bunnett
- Patricia Cano
- Criollo
- Alex Cuba
- Beto Cuevas
- Lhasa de Sela
- Quique Escamilla
- Nelly Furtado
- Florence K
- Tom Landa and The Paperboys
- Norteño
- Pacifika
- Lido Pimienta
- Adonis Puentes
- Jessie Reyez
- Alejandra Ribera
- Samba Squad
- Étienne Drapeau
- El Unico Gio

== List of certified Latin recordings in Canada ==
Certified Latin albums in Canada
Album	Artist	Record label	Released	Canadian Albums Chart	Certification	Units shipped	Reference(s)
Buena Vista Social Club	Buena Vista Social Club	World Circuit/Nonesu	September 5, 1997	—	3× Platinum	300,000	
Gipsy Kings	Gipsy Kings	Trans-Canada Disq	November 14, 1988	—	2× Platinum	200,000	
Greatest Hits	Gipsy Kings	Columbia International	September 8, 1998	—	2× Platinum	200,000	
Vuelve	Ricky Martin	Columbia Records	February 10, 1998	11	2× Platinum	200,000	
Buena Vista Social Club Presents Ibrahim Ferrer	Buena Vista Social Club	Nonesuch/Worldcircut	June 8, 1999	—	Platinum	100,000	
All My Hits/Todos Mis Exitos	Selena	EMI Music Canada	March 9, 1999	—	Platinum	100,000	
Sale el Sol	Shakira	Sony Music BMG	October 19, 2010	11	Platinum	80,000	
Dreaming of You	Selena	EMI Music Canada	July 18, 1995	17	Gold	50,000	
Volare! The Very Best Of The Gipsy Kings	Gipsy Kings	Epic Records	1999	—	Gold	50,000	
Mañana Será Bonito	Karol G	Universal Music Latino	February 24, 2023	13	Gold	40,000	
El Dorado	Shakira	Sony Music BMG	May 26, 2017	20	Gold	40,000	
Las Mujeres Ya No Lloran	Shakira	Sony Music BMG	March 22, 2024	73	Gold	40,000	
Euphoria	Enrique Iglesias	Universal Republic Canada	July 2, 2010	12	Gold	40,000	

== See also ==
- List of Canadian musicians
- List of bands from Canada
- Latin music in the United States
- Music of Canada
- Music of Spain
- Music of Latin America
