= Battle of Santiago =

The Battle of Santiago may refer to:

== Battles ==
- Battle of Santiago de Chile (1541), native insurrection against the Spanish
- Battle of Santiago (1660), an engagement between Dominican militia and French buccaneers
- Invasion of Cuba (1741), a British attempt to capture Santiago de Cuba
- Battle of Santiago de Cuba (1748), a failed attempt by the British Royal Navy to force entrance to the port of Santiago de Cuba
- Battle of Santiago (1844), battle in the Dominican War of Independence.
- Battle of Santiago (1863), battle fought during the Dominican Restoration War.
- Battle of Santiago (1898), naval battle in the Spanish–American War
- Siege of Santiago (1898), also known as the Siege of Santiago de Cuba, last major action in Cuba fought during the Spanish–American War
- Battle of Santiago (1957), riots in Santiago, Chile in 1957

== Sports ==
- Battle of Santiago (1962 FIFA World Cup), a football match between Chile and Italy during the 1962 FIFA World Cup which saw violent play and fighting on the pitch between the two teams

== Music ==
- Battle of Santiago (band), Canadian Afro-Cuban post-rock band formed in 2011

== See also ==
- Battle of Chacabuco (1817), battle that lead to the turnover of Santiago to independent Chile from Spain
- Battle of Monte Santiago (1827), battle between the Argentine Navy and Brazilian Imperial Navy during the Cisplatine War
- Action of April 3, 1836, battle between the Texan Navy and the Mexican Navy during the Texas Revolution, also known as the Battle of Brazos Santiago and Battle of Matamoros
