= Theodore Stanley Heneken =

British activist and politician

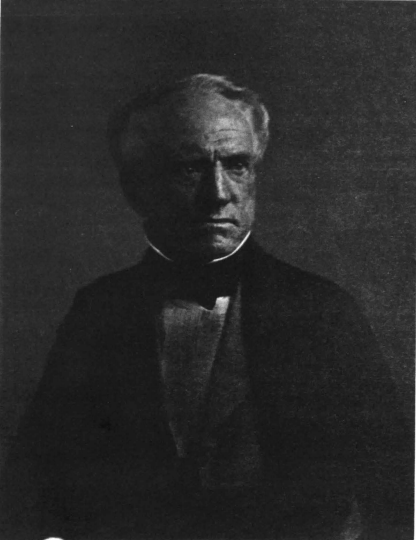
- Born: c. 1797; England
- Died: October 11, 1865; Santo Domingo, Dominican Republic
- Citizenship: British and Dominican

Theodore Stanley Heneken was a British activist who took part in the affairs of the Dominican Republic during its wars of independence against Haiti and against Spain between the 1840s and 1860s.

== Biography ==
Heneken was born in England at some point between the 1790s and the 1800s.

At the end of the 1820s, Heneken, attracted by the precious woods that existed in Hispaniola, settled in the north of the island in the city of Cap-Haïtien. It was there that in the second half of March 1844, Heneken became aware of the war preparations that were being made in that area, under the orders of the Haitian President Charles Rivière-Hérard and under the command of General Jean-Louis Pierrot, with the aim of occupying the cities of Puerto Plata and Santiago, after the Dominican Independence was declared on February 27, 1844. Upon learning of the plans of the Haitian military to crush the rebellion, Heneken, in a panic, left from Cap Haitien to Santiago to inform the Dominican independence fighters of the number of military personnel, estimated at 15 thousand, the type of weapons they had and the strategy they intended to develop to crush the recently proclaimed National Independence.

This is how the defenders of Santiago, led by Fernando Valerio, Román Franco Bidó, José María Imbert and José María López, among others, in the absence of Matías Ramón Mella who was in San José de las Matas, took cover on the banks of the Yaque del Norte River in the surroundings of Rafey and faced the invader in the Battle of Santiago, causing more than 600 casualties and forcing them to retreat, leaving behind wounded, prisoners and war supplies, all thanks to the logistics supplied to the Dominicans by Heneken.

From that moment on, Heneken was linked to the political activities of the Dominicans, participating in the efforts to expatriate Haitians imprisoned in Dominican jails and promoting civic and cultural activities, quickly becoming a naturalized Dominican for his behavior and dedication to patriotic activities.

Attracted by the precious woods existing in the northern part of the Northern Cordillera from Navarrete to Guayacanes, passing through Esperanza, he settled in the rural area of Pontón belonging to Esperanza when it was a Canton of the Santiago Province, on the banks of the Yaque del Norte River where the Monte Cristi and the Camino Real to Cabo Haitiano passed, near La Peñuela de Esperanza, becoming acquainted with the majority of our generals, mainly with his neighbor Gaspar Polanco, from the Canton of La Peñuela and the rancher Pedro Santana, among others, achieving for his merits that President Santana granted him Dominican Citizenship and the political designation of Member of the Tribunate (Deputies) for the province Santiago (to which Esperanza belonged) during the period 1847–1854.

In 1850, Heneken took part in securing the Dominican Republic's treaty with Great Britain.

In 1857, during the Revolutionary Government of José Desiderio Valverde, he was appointed Commissioner of Foreign Relations, Finance and Commerce.

Along with his political activities, he developed his business, lumber and livestock activities, becoming one of the main exporters of precious woods, which he transported on rafts along the Yaque River from Pontón to Manzanillo. From there, Pontón ranch he was the first to make sugar in nougat and sweet biscuits. At the same time he carried out scientific and cultural work, being, according to Prof. Eugenio de Jesús Marcano, the first to observe Dominican geology and that in 1853, he wrote the work entitled “Some Tertiary Deposits of Santo Domingo…”, and that in his honor there is a macrofossil with the name of Cimya henekeni.

On August 21, 1863, the Dominican Restoration War broke out on the island. Heneken was part of the War Board formed by the union of the initiating commanders of the Restoration, which was held in the Sabana de Los Fermines on the edge of Montecristi to Santiago in Guayacanes, where Colonel Heneken proclaimed General Polanco as Commander in Chief and Sole Leader of the Restoration Revolution, becoming his Secretary and Political Mentor, holding important positions in subsequent governments, becoming President of the National Convention of 1865.

Heneken died suspiciously (it is said that he was poisoned) in Santo Domingo on the afternoon of October 11, 1865. On October 12, the day of his burial, a day of National Mourning was declared, the flag was raised at half-mast and representatives of foreign nations and members of the Constituent Assembly participated in his funeral procession.

== Legacy ==
Heneken's remains were buried amid cannon salutes in the Independence Avenue Cemetery in Santo Domingo, where his grave disappeared when his remains were not claimed since he left no known descendants, although it is said that next to the recently built Hospital of the municipality of Navarrete there is a direct descendant who preserves the only photograph that exists of Heneken.

On December 19, 1974, the City Council of Esperanza, under the Office of the Mayor of Santiago, Mr. Osvaldo Muñoz, and the Presidency of the Chapter House, Miguel Jiménez Santelices, and after considering the letter from the Deputy for Santiago, Dr. Neftalí Núñez, and on the initiatives of Doctors Elías Fernández Bisonó and Julio Genaro Campillo Pérez, approved Resolution No. 18-74, by which it welcomed and recommended the naming of the Pontón section Villa Heneken, a decision that was ratified by the City Council of Villa Bisonó through its Resolution No. 5 dated June 28, 1975.

By Decree No. 1863 of April 6, 1976, the Villa Elisa Scientific Reserve was declared, later designated as “Dr. Orlando Cruz Franco” by Decree 176–86, located 8 kilometers north on the road to Punta Rusia. The purpose of this Scientific Reserve is to protect the second smallest in the world and one of the rarest species of ORCHIDS in our flora, the Oncidium Henekenii (commonly known as “Cacatica Orchid” due to its melithomimicry with an arachnid. This variety of orchid blooms between February and March), whose name was given to it in 1850 by its discoverer, the German botanist and researcher Robert Schomburg, in homage to his peer Teodoro Stanley Heneken.

On June 3, 1976, the then President of the Republic, Joaquín Balaguer, promulgated Law No. 411 by which the Section of Pontón was designated with the name VILLA HENEKEN, whose territory is today occupied by the municipalities of Esperanza, belonging to the province of Valverde, and Villa Bisonó, belonging to the province of Santiago. Among the reasons for making this decision, according to its CONSIDERANDUM, the legislator took into account Heneken's career, considering: "That it is an act of just historical reparation to pay tribute to the memory of such a prominent citizen."

== See also ==
- Battle of Santiago
- Dominican Republic–United Kingdom relations
- Dominican War of Independence
- Dominican Restoration War
