= Norteño =

Norteño (Spanish: "northerner") may refer to:

- Norteño refers to the people originally from Northern Mexico in hispanic countries
- By extension, Norteño refers to the people and the culture of Northern New Mexico (particularly north-central and north-eastern regions), formerly a part of Mexico
- Norteño (music) is a style of Mexican music related to polka and corridos
- Norteño (band) is a tango nuevo band from Ottawa, Ontario, Canada
- Norteño is an alcoholic beverage (aguardiente), from Ecuador
- The Norteños are a large organization of largely Mexican-American street gangs in the United States
