= Dominican–British Treaty (1850) =

1850 diplomatic treaty between Dominican Republic and Great Britain

Tratado de Reconocimiento, Paz, Amistad, Comercio y Navegación
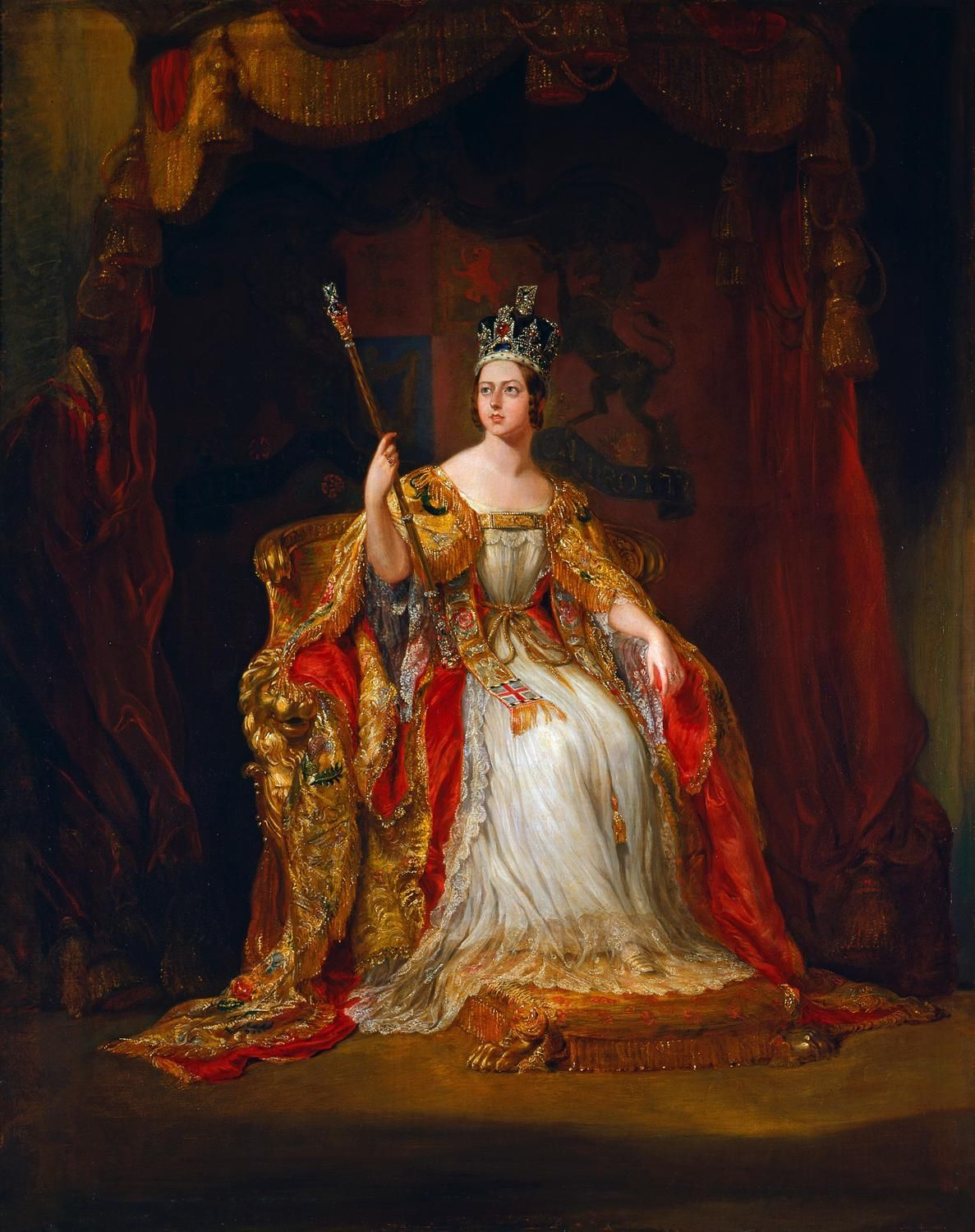
- Queen Victoria, the Queen of United Kingdom from 1837 to 1901
- Type: Diplomatic recognition and Trade agreement
- Signed: March 6, 1850
- Location: Santo Domingo, Dominican Republic
- Effective: 1850
- Parties: Dominican Republic (United Kingdom) Great Britain
- Language: Spanish, English

The Dominican–British Treaty (1850) (Spanish: Tratado Dominico–Británico de 1850) was an agreement between the Dominican Republic and the United Kingdom. Signed on March 6, 1850, this was the first international treaty of the Dominican Republic, which gave it historical importance. Furthermore, it served as a model for subsequent treaties between the independent Dominican state and other nations during the remainder of the 19th century. But the most important thing was that with its signature, the Dominican Republic received the first recognition as a State sovereign and nothing less than the most powerful nation in the world at that time: Great Britain, the “Queen of the Seas.” Its effects, both internal and external, were a great importance to its diplomatic relations as this took place in the midst of the Dominican War of Independence.

== Background ==
=== Attempt at recognition from the United States ===
The First Dominican Republic was proclaimed on February 27, 1844, and strengthened by the battles won against the Haitians, such as the Battle of Azua and the Battle of Santiago, on March 19 and 30 of that same year, respectively, the new Dominican authorities sought to consolidate it both internally and externally. The internal was a priority, since it consisted of the defense of the country against Haiti's attempts to reverse independence and keep the island united under its control. Also the organization of the new State was of great importance in the first years of Independence. The Constitution of San Cristóbal, passed on November 6, 1844, gave structure legal to the new nation.

Externally, there was an early project to obtain France the recognition and granting of a protectorate, promoted by the French group within the Central Government Board, whose main managers were Buenaventura Báez and Tomás Bobadilla. None of these goals were achieved because the French Government was reluctant to have more problems with Haiti than those it had at that time, when the payment of the debt assumed by Haitians was not resolved. These plans were halted further due to fears of local resistance to such projects, such as the coup d'état led by Generals Juan Pablo Duarte and José Joaquín Puello on June 9, 1844.

If France recognized Dominican Independence, renounced recovering the portion of the island from which it had ruled previously between 1795 and 1809 and would reduce the possibility to fully collect that debt. Regarding the protectorate, the French Foreign Ministry ruled it out, despite the insistence of its Consul in Santo Domingo, Eustache Juchereau de Saint-Denys. French diplomacy was very emphatic on that point, reiterating it on several occasions to the Dominican Government, through letters from the Chancellor to Consul Saint-Denys, in which France was not interested in the protectorate, as he noted in one of them, on November 20, 1844:

“The King's resolution has not changed. It matters now that she be engaged in Santo Domingo. It is not an abandonment, far from it, we wish that the Dominican Republic triumphs and overcomes the difficulties surrounding its birth; we will gladly help with everything which could strengthen it, whether inside or outside, but we believe useless, even for their own interests, become their protectors.”

While plans for protectorate ceased, French rejected a recognition of the new state. Thus, the next step was to go turn to the United States. The government chaired by Pedro Santana, recently installed after the promulgation of the Constitution of San Cristóbal of November 1844, decided to send an emissary to Washington. It was José María Caminero, who had been a member of the Central Government Board, (Government Dominican Provisional between March and November 1844) and the Constituent Assembly. Caminero arrived in Washington in December of that same year, carrying a letter of introduction from President Santana to American President John Tyler. He was received by the Secretary of State John C. Calhoun, in January 1845, to whom he subjected a Memorandum summarizing what happened after the proclamation of the Dominican Republic and formally requesting its recognition as an independent nation.

The United States Government welcomed the Dominican proposal, but before making a decision, it sent a person to Santo Domingo to learn about the situation. The envoy was John Hogan, who visited the country between February and October 1845, meeting with several Dominican officials, Archbishop Tomás de Portes e Infante, some merchants from his country residing in the Dominican capital and a Protestant Pastor. All gave favorable written opinions to the new Republic Commissioner Hogan returned to Washington and presented a long report to his Government, which concluded with these sentences:

“It only remains for me to add that in relation to these documents, I have every reason to judge that must be kept confidential, relieved of all precision; I have no doubt that the Dominican Republic, if not interfered with by foreign influences, has the full capacity to maintain its independence and even expand the territory under its sovereignty over the entire island."

But even so, the United States Government was not willing to recognize the new State that emerged on the island of Hispaniola. Perhaps due to the ongoing war on the island, American diplomats were uncertain if the Dominican Republic would emerge triumphant against the Haitian invasions. Several years passed without a decision from the Government of Washington, until, in 1846, he decided to send Navy Lieutenant David Dixon Porter, with the mission of investigating the Dominican situation. Lieutenant Porter passed several months in the country and gave a long and detailed report to his government, full of racist comments and statistics, which concluded with the opinion that the Dominican Republic should be recognized by the United States. Among his conclusions, he said of the Dominicans:

“No cause can be more just than yours; and once the history of all its sufferings is understood, and its Independence is recognized by a nation, I am convinced that they will have the sympathy of all, and each one will be eager to recognize them as an independent Government. […] It is certainly in the interest of the Government of the United States to take advantage of the present state of affairs and support the Dominican side in opposition to the faction on the western side of the island”

It turns out, however, that at that time, the United States was at war with neighboring Mexico to seize large portions of territory in the present-day states of Texas, California, Arizona and New Mexico and the Dominican issue was not a priority. Therefore, despite the recommendations of Commissioner Hogan and Lieutenant Porter, the Dominicans attempt to have their independence recognized by the United States ended with no result.

=== European recognition ===
Afterwards, Dominican officials soon shifted its gaze towards European powers: Spain, United Kingdom and again France. This was a serious and considered effort, with the sending, in May 1846, of an important Mission to those nations, which was composed of the outstanding characters of the new Buenaventura Báez, José María Medrano and Juan Esteban Aybar. However, due to an illness, Medrano was replaced shortly after by Pedro Antonio Bobea. The missionaries had precise instructions to present them in Madrid, Paris and London and for this they were given credentials and instructions.

What was sought was the formal recognition of the new nation and the signing of Recognition, Peace, Trade and Navigation Treaties. The Recognition of Independence was more urgent, since it would constitute a very important element in the face of Haitian efforts to recover what they call “the eastern part,” which they had lost in February 1844. These instructions were given in a document, dated from May 26, 1846, and in them the commissioners were required to conclude with those three countries, Treaties whose points essential were that:

“1. The Dominican Republic, in its condition as a free, independent and sovereign State, administered herself internally and preserved the right to make all kinds of international treaties. 2. The nation with whom you deal undertakes to do cease the hostilities that exist between the Dominican Republic and Haiti, answer for stability of peace and at the same time come out in defense of that in case of aggression on the part of the Haitians, looking at each other as such, the simple breaking of the territorial limits.

It started with going to Spain. Despite being well received, the Spanish attitude was lukewarm. That country was going through a situation very unstable politics and gave little importance to the Dominican topic. Furthermore, recognizing the independence of the Dominican Republic would mean giving up their rights towards it, since the Spanish still aspired to recover their oldest colony in the New World, which had previously detached itself from Spain in 1821. Therefore, the commissioners left Spain discouraged. From Madrid they went to Paris. The management there was at the beginning encouraging but in the end it was equally ineffective, because France was also going through a great political crisis. When the Mission arrived in Paris, in November 1847, it encountered an explosive situation, which culminated three months later with the deposition of King Louis Philippe I and the establishment of a provisional republican regime and in those circumstances, no negotiation was possible. However, the Dominican Government understood that it was easier to negotiate with a republic than with a monarchy and this was indicated by his Cabinet to Congress, in his message of February 27, 1848.

Therefore, it was months later when the French political situation, negotiations resumed which culminated, on October 22, 1848, with the signing of a recognition treaty. This treaty was ratified by the Dominican Congress, on April 3, 1849, but the French National Assembly did not validate it and, consequently, it was ineffective. (It was years later that, in 1852, a new Treaty was negotiated and ratified by the Legislative Branch of both countries, in May of that year).

The Dominican Commissioners traveled to their last destination, London, from whose Government they expected better treatment. In August 1848 negotiations began with the governmental authorities of Her Britannic Majesty. Contrary to France and Spain, Great Britain enjoyed a great political stability and enviable economic prosperity. Great Britain was referred as The Queen of the Seas, because its war and trade ships crossed all the oceans. It had colonies in the Caribbean, Asia, Africa and Oceania. (The British did not aspire to more possessions in the Caribbean Sea, since Jamaica, Trinidad and Tobago and other small islands were enough). British Foreign Secretary Lord Palmerston immediately became interested in learning about this Mission and the nation it represented. In February 1848, a British citizen residing in Santo Domingo, named Hendricks, had already suggested to the Government of London the appointment of a consul in the new Republic that had emerged on the island. In his letter to Lord Palmerston he indicated that France already had a consul there and the United States a Commercial Agent. He explained that this new country was an exporter of wood, tobacco, leather and other items towards Britain and therefore an official representative would be a great convenience for commerce.

Shortly after, in response to that request and before start negotiations with the Dominican Commissioners, the British Government appointed a Consul in Santo Domingo. The importance that the British gave to the new Republic was evident with that designation, since it fell to an eminent scientist from Germany who had recently been ennobled by Queen Queen Victoria with the title of Knight: Sir Robert Hermann Schomburgk; character who played a very important role in the Dominican Republic in subsequent years. He was also the person whom the British Government commissioned to carry out the negotiation of the Treaty with the Dominican Mission. There was no need, as in the case of the United States, to send a reconnaissance mission. The British already knew a lot about the new country, from reports from their subjects residing in Santo Domingo and Cibao who advocated the establishment of diplomatic and commercial relations.

== Treaty ==
The Dominican mission that traveled to London, included in the instructions it received the list of matters that had to be included in the treaty: the formal recognition of the Dominican Independence; the search for solutions to put an end to Haitian aggression; the appointment of consuls between both nations; an agreement on free trade, and the pact not to impose higher tariffs than those required to other nations. The British, in turn, were interested in other clauses, such as that of religious freedom and equality in the payment of trade licenses with the same tax as imposed on the Dominicans.

The British already had similar treaties with other nations of South America and wanted for the Dominican case a similar text. The Dominican Mission was well received and even entertained in London. They visited the royal Windsor Castle, a naval shipyard and negotiations began on September 6, 1848. Schomburgk was both British Delegate and interpreter. The conversations were slow and little was achieved. A final project was known, but the Dominicans did not feel they had sufficient powers to approve some of their aspects. Furthermore, eager to return to the country, they asked that The negotiations will continue in Santo Domingo, with the British representation in the hands of Consul Schomburgk, who would leave in those days to take office. The Dominican delegates were absent for Santo Domingo in November 1848. A hidden reason for That exit was that Buenaventura Báez had a lot of interest in returning to the country to participate in the difficult political situation locally, in which President Manuel Jimenes and former President Santana had such strong confrontations that soon the second deposed the first.

Schomburgk arrived in the country in January 1849 and took possession of his position the following month. A few months later, the invasion of Haitian Emperor Faustin I made the continuation of negotiations on the Treaty impossible. The initial fear that Haitians would occupy the capital caused many foreigners to seek asylum in the Consulates of Britain and France.

Only after the Dominicans defeated the Haitians in the Battle of Las Carreras, in April of that year, calm returned and it seemed that negotiations could continue. But soon another crisis prevented it and it was the fight between the president Jimenes and his rival General Santana. In May 1849, the fight turned into a short civil war between both sides that caused the overthrow of Jimenes and that in the capital The consulates were filled with their followers. It was after both crises had been overcome that were able to restart negotiations for the signing of the Treaty.It took a long time to do it, since each proposed modification on one side had to be approved by the other, which meant that when Schomubugk received a counter proposal Dominican had to write to her Chancellor in London and wait for your response. Sailing ship trips between Santo Domingo and England were not frequent and had to be done stopover on some British or Danish island, so it was the logical slowness that had prevented a quick agreement. The British considered discriminatory that its merchants based in the country would pay a higher patent tax than what they used to pay the Dominicans. The current Patent Law established the following:

“Article 8: While the war lasts and while the foreigners exempt from all military service, then that they have complied with the formality provided for in the previous article, will be subject to patent law as follows: For consignee in all ports qualified, will pay annually the sum of 1,000 pesos. For the bulk merchant, 600 pesos. For the shopkeeper, 400 pesos. For a grocery store, 250 pesos. Article 9: Any foreigner who declares that he wants to practice any industry or profession subject to the right of patent, except those included in the article preceding, will pay double the sum set by the tariff on nationals while the war lasts.”

The difference was more than 30%. That point was not could be resolved in the negotiations in London. Nor that of religious freedom. The British alluded to Article 38 of the Dominican Constitution which established:

The Catholic, Apostolic, Roman Religion is the state religion; his ministers, as to the exercise of the ecclesiastical ministry, depend only of the canonically instituted prelates.

Although in the list of rights enshrined in the Constitution those of free association and assembly appeared, the British wanted the treaty to establish specifically the right that his subjects could exercise his Protestant religion. Religious freedom was a requirement of the British, due to the existence of Protestant communities in Samaná and Puerto Plata. Furthermore, all British nationals who settled in the country, who did not convert to Catholic, and did not want to be prevented from freely professing their beliefs.

There was a precedent in the treaty with France that had been signed in Paris, on October 22, 1848, and was submitted for ratification by the legislatures of both countries, since in its Article 5 established freedom of conscience and religion. But as indicated above, the French National Assembly did not ratify it. The British did not want to be left behind and pressed to resolve the points in controversy. In April 1849, The Dominican Government appointed Juan Nepomuceno Tejera as the representative for the continuation of negotiations of the treaty and that same month Schomburgk notified the Dominican Government who had received instructions from his Chancellor to continue negotiations.

=== Important aspects ===
However, it was not until January 1850 that the consul Schomburgk was able to notify his Foreign Ministry that the negotiations had been resumed. Santana had shown herself less demanding in conflict points, such as in their claim that the state could maintain a monopoly on the import and export of products. He limited himself to asking that this monopoly be only temporary and while the war with Haiti lasted. It was agreed that that point will not be included in the text of the Treaty, but in an Annex. His point of religious freedom was objected to by Dominican Catholic clergy, Archbishop Portes, vehemently protested from the pulpit and personally in front of Santana.

The duration of the treaty, which had originally been agreed to be for only 4 years, was also discussed. Schomburgk wrote to Chancellor Lord Palmerston, on January 29, 1850, that President Santana had shown himself flexible on difficult points and that apart from the problem religious and patent, everything else was agreed upon. Santana's interest in having the Treaty signed ignored the complaints of the clergy and allowed the freedom of conscience and worship will be included in its text. He appointed a new representative, Minister Manuel Joaquín del Monte. Negotiations continued in February and early of March.

On March 6, 1850, Consul Schomburgk informed his chancellor Lord Palmerston that the Treaty was now ready for the signature. But Del Monte opposed signing it because he understood that Article 9 was unacceptable. Its text authorized the British warships to board, in territorial Dominican waters, to any Dominican or foreign vessel that, in the opinion of the British, could be harboring black foreigners who were taken to places where slavery was allowed. In order not to sign the treaty, Monte preferred to resign from his position. Santana's haste made him accept Del's resignation Monte and in his place appointed José María Medrano, who had been a member of the Delegation that had traveled to Europe in 1846 to seek recognition of Dominican independence. According to Consul Schomburg, in his aforementioned letter of March 6, the country awaited with great hope the signing of the Treaty, since he feared being disappointed as happened with those with the French, who after having signed a Treaty very similar, they did not ratify it.

=== Signature and ratification of the treaty ===
Finally, on March 6, 1850, the Treaty was signed the country being represented by José María Medrano and the Great Brittany by its consul Sir Robert Schomburgk. He himself had 11 Articles and one additional one that specified that while the war against Haiti lasted, the Dominican Government could establish extraordinary measures on trade and monopolies. On April 30 of that year, Schomburgk reported to his Government that the Dominican Congress had ratified it On Queen Victoria's birthday, 24 May, the British Consul hosted a reception in her honor and to celebrate the signing of the Treaty. Likewise, in Santo Domingo it was received with great complacency and proof of this was that, on June 29, 1850, the Dominican Government held a great banquet at the National Palace, to which, of course, Consul Schomburgk was invited, “as a gift to Her Majesty Queen Victoria I for the Treaty of Recognition, of the Independence, Peace, Friendship, Commerce and Navigation that has just been celebrated with the Government of this Republic.”(12)

On September 6, 1850, when it was reported that the queen Victoria had ratified the Treaty, the Dominican authorities declared a holiday on the 10th and a solemn ceremony was held in the Dominican National Palace, followed by a te deum in the cathedral and gun salute from the Ozama Fortress. It is also sent a letter that he had received from Cibao personalities recognizing British support in the war against Haiti and for the signing of the Treaty. Among the signatories were: Theodore Stanley Heneken; Benigno Filomeno de Rojas; José Dubcoq; Domingo Daniel Pichardo Pró; Ulises Francisco Espaillat; Domingo Mallol; Furcy Fondeur and José Desiderio Valverde, who would play important roles in the future of the country. Already in June of that year, 1850, received a similar letter from personalities in the capital, with the signatures of: J. A. Caminero; Toribio López Villanueva; Jacinto de Castro; Miguel Lavastida; Noel Henríquez and others, in which they “reverently” supported Queen Victoria and they congratulated her on her birthday.(13)

The importance of this treaty cannot be overemphasized for the Dominican Republic. Six years after its independence, the first world power gave it its recognition. With that endorsement, the Dominicans could feel stronger in the face of Haitian claims and invasions. Likewise, it removed the possibilities of a protectorate or annexation by other powers. Furthermore, said treaty gave rise to other nations to imitate the British and also sign recognition agreements, as were the cases of Denmark, in 1851, Holland, in 1853, Spain, in 1855 and the United States, in 1856.

=== Difficulties in the application of the Treaty ===
After the euphoria of the signing and ratification of the Dominican-British treaty, problems of interpretation and application arose. The most controversial point was the payment of the commercial patent that British merchants had to make based in the country. This is what happened in March 1852, when Consul Schomburgk complained to the Foreign Minister Dominican Foreign Affairs because a British merchant last name McKa and the Santo Domingo City Council had collected a patent for an amount greater than what Dominicans had to pay. The consul's complaint Schomburgk indicated that he wanted:(14)

“to solemnly protest against charging any subject of His Majesty, resident in the territory of the Dominican Republic, a higher price for the license to be able to buy and sell within her, that the one that Dominican citizens are obliged to pay, who in Great Britain enjoy the same rights and privileges as in that country sense enjoyed by His Majesty's own subjects.”

The Dominicans, however, believed was that this article of the treaty was implying that the British would be treated no worse than that given to merchants from other nations, not the Dominicans. The matter reached Congress where The legislators supported the position of Chancellor Aybar. By 1852, Lord Palmerston was not chancellor and his position was occupied by Lord Malmesbury, who did not want any difficulties with its interpretation just two years after the Treaty was signed. Furthermore, Consul Schomburgk said, in a letter dated May 31, 1852, that the treaty was not specific regarding equal treatment between Dominican and British merchants, but what the text prohibited was that the British people were not treated worse than other foreigners, but that the spirit of it was that there should be equal treatment among all.

Chancellor Malmesbury, although he agreed with Consul Schomburgk, did not want this point to provoke a conflict, so he instructed him to express to the Dominican Government his displeasure at the attitude assumed by the local authorities, and nothing more.(15) But in a very subtle and diplomatic way, he scolded the Dominican Government for not being faithful to the spirit of the Treaty, indicating that:(16)

"It appears that His Majesty's Government, during the negotiations on the issue of Patents and Licenses, had the verbal assurances and supposed friendly and liberal dispositions, and good faith of the Dominican Government, and was therefore induced to cease peremptorily insisting on the insertion of an express stipulation in the Treaty against the imposition of such burdens; and despite the fact that the Government of His Majesty considers that the Dominican Government is not legally bound by the letter of the Treaty to exonerate His Majesty's subjects from those burdens, in particular, whose origin and legality are not apparent to us, I am asked to express to the Minister the displeasure of His Majesty's Government in the breaking, in this case by the Dominican Government, of said verbal promises and of the friendly and liberal spirit that were expressed while the Treaty was under negotiations and on which the Government of His Majesty counted confidently.”

Another point of the treaty that, as expected, produced difficulties were related to religious freedom. It happened when a Protestant Minister in Puerto Plata, the Reverend Willam Towler, wanted to erect a chapel and was prevented by the local authorities. Consul Schomburgk complained to the Dominican Government and informed his chancellor. Lord Malmesbury also did not want that case to be a point of conflict, and instructed Schomburgk to try to convince the Dominican authorities that the erection of a chapel was within the terms of Article 8 of the treaty, but if he did not succeed, to inform the Reverend Towler, who would hold services within a private chapel in his own home. So was done and the problem was solved without major consequences.

Another case in the interpretation of the treaty arose in November 1852, when a black British Protestant pastor, named Richard Walter, arrived in Puerto Plata from the Turks and Caicos Islands, (who came in from Haiti), and was arrested by the authorities of that city. The Dominicans, still in the midst of war with the neighboring island country, feared the infiltration of spies and, therefore, any black foreigner who came from Haiti was considered suspicious. After many communications and recriminations between Consul Schomburgk and the Dominican authorities in Santo Domingo, he was finally allowed to enter to the British Consulate as an asylum and was later deported.

Finally, there was another case that caused a lot of headaches for Consul Schomburgk, who was very similar to the previous one. Several schooners arrived in Puerto Plata full of undocumented blacks without passports from the Turks and Caicos Islands, which was a British colony, located north of the island of Santo Domingo. Those islands had as their main and the only productive activity is the production of sea salt. During the rainy season, the salt flats lost salinity and, therefore, production was suspended, so when the temporarily unemployed workers came to Puerto Plata looking for temporary work.

The Dominican authorities prohibited their disembarkation and the British vice-consul in Puerto Plata, William Brefitt, informed Consul Schomburgk, who took the complaint to the Dominican Chancellery. The official Dominican response maintained that since they were black, they could be Haitians who came to spy and since they did not have any identification it could not be ensured whether they were British or not. Since the treaty obliged the Dominican authorities to provide facilities to British subjects who arrived in the country. Schomburgk alleged that the entry ban on workers from the Turks and Caicos Islands violated that contractual provision. There was a great exchange of correspondence between the British consul and Dominican authorities in both Santo Domingo and Puerto Plata. The official British position Chancellor Malmesbury expressed it in a letter to his Consul, dated October 11, 1852, in the following words:(17)

“I must indicate to you in response that under the circumstances cited and considering the terms of the existing Treaty between Great Britain and the Dominican Republic, Her Majesty's Government is of opinion that the Dominican Government did not have the right to act, under no justifiable circumstances to act as they did, without having previously

published the Regulation or communicate it to her Majesty's Consular Authorities, and more

particularly, in the absence of (at least in As for women) any circumstance of a suspicion or emergency. Even if such Regulation as the one referred to, would have been legally promulgated by a competent authority and applied to all foreigners, the passport or certification written statement from the British Consular Authorities in the place, they should have been sufficient to entitle the persons concerned to be considered in all felt as British subjects, most especially, because they certainly were not Dominicans. Therefore, it will inform the Dominican Government that the Government of H.M. requires that they give clear notice to the Consular Authorities of His Majesty of the existence and terms of any regulations that affect the rights or interests of the subjects of her Majesty, especially those guaranteed to it under the treaty.”

Finally, the case was not solved but was diluted when those emigrants returned to the Turks and Caicos Islands.

All of these problems occurred at times when Emperor Soulouque invaded Dominican territory again, in November 1855, being again defeated, and the mediation efforts that Great Britain, France and the United States sought to achieve a truce or a definitive peace between Dominicans and Haitians. The mediation had as its main actor the consul Sir Robert Schomburgk and, as is known, finally that pressure international took effect, achieving a brief truce and the Haitian invasions ceased.

== Aftermath ==
The Dominican Republic signed its first effective international treaty 6 years after gaining independence. The consul of Great Britain Sir Robert Hermann Schomburgk played a role in diplomatic efforts that contributed in a truce between the Dominican Republic and Haiti. Schomburgk was a naturalist and explorer who conducted surveys of the regions geography, flora, and fauna. His preserved reports and findings are divided in multiple British institutions such as the Royal Geographical Society, Royal Botanic Gardens, Kew (Kew Gardens Herbarium), The Natural History Museum, London, and The British Library.

By 1855, eight nations had signed Treaties of Recognition of Independence, Peace, Friendship, Trade and Navigation with the Dominican Republic. Following Great Britain, France ratified a second Treaty, in 1852; Denmark in 1852; Holland in 1851; Spain, Sardinia and the Free State of Bremen in 1855. The treaties with Holland and Denmark were important because those two nations had colonies in nearby Lesser Antilles and many products passed through its ports marketable between the Dominican Republic and Europe. These included the Dutch possessions of Curaçao and Aruba and the Danish-controlled island of Saint-Thomas. Bremen was an important German port in which the country placed agricultural products (tobacco, cocoa, some coffee, honey and wax) and at the same time acquired articles of use and consumption that did not produce. With the signature of the above treaties, the Dominican Republic strengthened its commercial position and laid the foundations to start a weak economic development process.

Haiti, despite its 50 years of independent life, only had a Treaty of Recognition, Peace, Friendship, Commerce and Navigation: with France. It was an important achievement that was overshadowed by its commitment to compensate her with a heavy debt that never was able to be paid in full. Haitians had to wait many years to get other countries to recognize their country as an independent nation. The United States recognized in 1865, after the abolition of slavery following its Civil War. Other nations also took a lot of time to do it. This highlights how the Dominican Republic, even in moments of serious internal and external crises, knew how to develop a diplomatic policy that earned the friendship and support of the great international powers, thereby consolidating its independence, managing to consolidate it and guarantee its further development.

== See also ==
- Dominican War of Independence
- First Dominican Republic
- Dominican Republic–United Kingdom relations
- Queen Victoria

== Bibliography ==
- Gobierno Dominicano. “Invitación para asistir a banquete en el Palacio Nacional, en ocasión del cumpleaños de la Reina Victoria I y la firma del Tratado de Reconocimiento, Paz, Amistad, Comercio y Navegación. Santo Domingo, 29 de junio de 1850”. Londres, Foreign Office. Documentos de Archivo de Bernardo Vega donados al Archivo General de la Nación. En lo adelante FO.DABV-AGN.
- Gobierno Dominicano. Colección de Leyes, Decretos y Resoluciones Emanadas de los Poderes Legislativo y Ejecutivo de la República Dominicana, Tomos 2 y 3, año 1847. Santo Domingo, Imprenta del Listín Diario, 1927.
- Hendricks, H. “Carta al canciller británico lord Palmerston. Santo Domingo, febrero de 1848”. FO.DABV-AGN. Malmesbury, canciller lord. “Carta al cónsul sir Robert
- Schomburgk. Londres, 31 de mayo de 1852”. FO.DABV-AGN. Malmesbury, canciller lord. “Carta al cónsul sir Robert
- Schomburgk. Londres, 30 de junio de 1852”. FO.DABV-AGN. Malmesbury, canciller lord. “Carta al cónsul sir Robert
- Schomburgk. Londres, 11 de octubre de 1852. FO.DABV-AGN.
- Schomburgk, cónsul sir Robert. “Carta al canciller lord Palmerston. Santo Domingo, 29 de enero de 1850”. FO.DABV-AGN.
- Schomburgk, cónsul sir Robert. “Carta al canciller lord Palmerston. Santo Domingo, 6 de septiembre de 1850”. F.O.DABV-AGN.
- Schomburgk, cónsul sir Robert. “Carta al Canciller Dominicano”. Santo Domingo, 11 de maro de 1852. FO.DABV-AGN.
