= Paco Serrano =

- Born: 5 September 1964 (age 61)
- Origin: Córdoba, Spain
- Genres: Flamenco music
- Occupation(s): Composer, Guitarist
- Instrument: Guitar

Paco Serrano (Francisco Miguel Serrano Cantero) is a Flamenco guitarist from Córdoba.

At the age of 12 he was studying at the Flamenco Academy of Merengue de Córdoba (the teacher also of Vicente Amigo and José Antonio Rodríguez), his sister Luisa learning dance with Merengue's wife Concha Calero at the same location. For recreation, he accompanied the dance of his sister, and the singers in the Peña Flamenca de Córdoba.

Following a TV appearance in 1980 with his teachers' troupe, he served his apprenticeship as accompanist to many major flamenco singers, such as Fosforito, La Niña de La Puebla, Juanito Valderrama, Chano Lobato, El Chocolate, José Mercé, Luís de Córdoba and Carmen Linares.

The late '80s and early '90s saw him winning several national prizes, culminating in both the Premio Manolo de Huelva for accompaniment and the Premio Ramón Montoya for solo guitar at the Concurso Nacional de Arte Flamenco.

In 1996 he graduated with a Master's Degree in Music from Rotterdam Conservatory, giving him the formal qualifications necessary to take up the position of Professor at the Conservatorio Superior de Música de Córdoba, which he still holds.

== Awards and prizes ==
- 1989 Premio Radio Nacional de España
- 1990 Gold Insignia of the Peña Flamenca de Córdoba
- 1991 1st prize at La Unión (Premio Bordón Minero)
- 1991 Gold Insignia of the Peña Flamenca de Murcia
- 1992 1st prize for accompaniment at Concurso Nacional de arte flamenco de Córdoba (Premio Manolo de Huelva)
- 1992 1st prize for solo guitar at Concurso Nacional de arte flamenco de Córdoba (Premio Ramón Montoya)
- 1995 Madroño Flamenco of the Peña Flamenca de Montellano (Seville)
- 2002 Fiambrera de Plata prize of the Ateneo de Córdoba

== Partial discography ==
=== As an accompanist ===
- 1983 Mi verdad by Antonio de Patrocinio
- 1984 Amor a mi tierra by Curro Díaz
- 1984 El metal noble by Joaquín Garrido
- 1984 Tierras del Sur by Antonio de Patrocinio
- 1987 Jodar canta by Various Artists
- 1988 Dejadme vivir by El Chaparro
- 1988 Córdoba en su cante by Various Artists
- 1990 Corazón de encina by Cándido de Quintana
- 1990 Flamencos de Córdoba by Various Artists
- 1992 Dos mundos cantan by El Perro de Paterna & Enrique Orozco
- 1993 La Unión by José Mercé & El Chocolate
- 1994 Confederación andaluza de Peñas by Joselete de Linares
- 2001 Me duele, me duele by Marina Heredia

=== As a soloist ===
- 1999 Mi camino
- 2012 Catarsis

== Sheet music + video ==
1993 La Guitarra Flamenca (Encuentro Productions)

== Flamenco Guitar Teaching ==
2012 Manual de la guitarra flamenca (Guitart)

2015 Online flamenco guitar lessons at onlineflamenco.com
