= Las Reinas del Pueblo =

Compilation album by Selena and Graciela Beltrán
- Released: April 4, 1995
- Recorded: 1990–1995
- Genre: Tejano cumbia; banda
- Length: 35:26
- Language: Spanish
- Label: EMI Latin
- Producer: A.B. Quintanilla; Roberto Guadarrama

Selena chronology
12 Super Éxitos (1994)	Las Reinas del Pueblo (1995)	Dreaming of You (1995)

Graciela Beltrán chronology
Tesoro (1995)	Las Reinas del Pueblo (1995)	Mi Corazón Es Tuyo (1996)

Las Reinas del Pueblo (English: The People's Queens) is a compilation album by American Tejano music singer Selena and Mexican banda singer Graciela Beltrán. It was released on April 4, 1995, by EMI Latin in the wake of Selena's death on March 31, 1995. The decision to produce a compilation album featuring Beltrán emerged after her tribute to the singer at a Houston memorial. The title was inspired by Mexican newspapers that referred to Selena as "an artist of the people" during a 1992 press tour in the nation and subsequently dubbed her "La Reina del Pueblo" in the aftermath of her death. Las Reinas del Pueblo encompasses six tracks by Selena and six by Beltrán, encapsulating their respective tenures with EMI Latin. Las Reinas del Pueblo peaked at number four on the US Billboard Top Latin Albums and Regional Mexican Albums chart, both behind other Selena releases. The recording peaked at number 147 on the American Billboard 200 chart. The album peaked at number ten on the Spanish albums chart in 2010. Beltrán's participation in the album yielded substantial promotional and sales enhancements.

== Background ==
On March 31, 1995, American Tejano music singer Selena was shot and killed by Yolanda Saldívar, her friend and former manager of the singer's boutiques. Concurrently, the artist was engrossed in the development of a crossover, designed to propel her into the American pop market. Within hours of Selena's murder, record stores sold out of her albums; EMI Latin began pressing several million CDs and cassettes to meet the expected demand. Concurrently, her song "Fotos y Recuerdos" held the fourth position on the American Billboard Hot Latin Tracks chart the day she was killed, ultimately peaking at the apex during the initial week that encapsulated the impact of her death. Moreover, her album, Amor Prohibido, rose from the fourth to first position on the Top Latin Albums chart. A resurgence of interest in Selena's music helped three of her other albums—Entre a Mi Mundo (1992), Live! (1993), and 12 Super Éxitos (1994)—re-entering the Top Latin Albums chart, while her albums occupied the first four chart positions on the Regional Mexican Albums chart in the same week. Additionally, all four albums simultaneously charted on the Billboard 200, an unprecedented feat for a Hispanic artist.

In 1994, Mexican banda singer Graciela Beltrán signed with EMI Latin, subsequently releasing her debut album, Baraja de Oro, which sold 100,000 units in the United States. Beltrán's prominence surged substantially with the launch of Tesoro (1995), amassing sales of 200,000 units within the US. It has been posited that Beltrán's rendition of Selena's "No Me Queda Más" (1994) during a memorial held in Houston, provided the impetus for EMI Latin to release a compilation album featuring both Beltrán's and Selena's recordings. Selena's affable disposition during a 1992 Mexican press tour earned her the moniker "an artist of the people", and she was subsequently dubbed "La Reina del Pueblo" in the aftermath of her death. According to Beltrán, she and Selena were the only regional Mexican music singers on the label. The company wanted to showcase both of them; Beltrán being from Mexico and Selena from Texas. The compilation album, titled Las Reinas del Pueblo, was announced on April 2, 1995, with a scheduled release date of April 4.

== Music ==
The album comprises six tracks from Selena and six from Beltrán. It commences with Selena's "Como la Flor" (1992), a commercially and critically acclaimed piece widely regarded as Selena's signature song, "Como la Flor" has become a posthumous epithet and swan song, as well as her most renowned recording. The subsequent track, Beltrán's rendition of Ramón Ayala's "Baraja de Oro", has emerged as one of Beltrán's most celebrated recordings. Selena's "No Debes Jugar", the third song on the album, was initially released as a studio track on Selena Live! The fourth track, Beltrán's "Pilares de Cristal", ascended regional music charts in various states, including Texas, California, Oregon, Illinois, Arizona, and Florida. Selena's "Bidi Bidi Bom Bom", the fifth song, features lyrics that originally portrayed a jubilant fish swimming freely in the ocean, before it transitioned into a cumbia and reggae song. Its onomatopoeic title and its nonsensical lyrics suggest the sound of a woman's heart throbbing for her crush.

The album continues with Beltrán's cover Mexican singer-songwriter Juan Gabriel on "Tú Me Dijiste Adiós". Selena's "La Llamada" is featured as the seventh track, while Beltrán's rendition of Cornelio Reyna's song "Mi Triunfo" appears as the eighth song, originally found on her Tesoro (1995) album. The ninth track, Selena's "¿Qué Creías?", functions as a "kiss-off anthem", that Selena claimed represents "all the ladies". Biographer Joe Nick Patoski characterized the track as "all sass and fire" and noted its deviation from Selena's customary cumbia style. The tenth song, Beltrán's "Tu Recado," is sourced from her second studio album, Graciela Beltran Con La Banda Santa Cruz (1993). The penultimate track, Selena's "La Carcacha", originally appeared on her album Entre a Mi Mundo (1992). Tejano music often suffered from simplistic and generic lyrical content; however, Selena's brother A.B. Quintanilla and her backup dancer and singer Pete Astudillo overcame this stereotype by crafting songs that rendered vibrant depictions of life in the barrio. The album concludes with Beltrán's "Morena y Delgadita".

== Critical and commercial performance ==
Professional ratings
Review scores
Source	Rating
AllMusic	3/5 stars

As reported by Ramiro Burr of the San Antonio Express-News, Beltrán experienced a significant promotional and sales augmentation following her appearance on the album. A parallel appraisal by Pat Muir in the TCA Regional News reiterated Burr's contention that Beltrán's career benefited from her participation in the album. Muir wrote how, akin to Selena, Beltrán's voice transcends linguistic boundaries, conveying emotions lucidly. Though English-speaking listeners may not grasp her precise words, they can discern her intended meaning. Following the album's release, its title evolved into an esteemed sobriquet for Beltrán. AllMusic characterizes the album's prevailing ambiance as spicy, street-smart, exuberant, sensual, and celebratory.

Las Reinas del Pueblo debuted at number 42 on the US Top Latin Albums chart and number 15 on the US Regional Mexican Albums chart. After a full week of availability, the album debuted at number 192 on the US Billboard 200 chart, concurrently with four other Selena titles, extending her record for the highest number of appearances on the Billboard 200 charts by a Hispanic singer. It subsequently rose and peaked at number four on the US Top Latin Albums and Regional Mexican Albums charts, trailing other Selena releases. In 2010, Las Reinas del Pueblo debuted and peaked at number ten on the Spanish albums chart.

== Track listing ==
Credits adapted from the liner notes of Las Reinas del Pueblo by EMI Latin.

No.	Title	Writer(s)	Artist	Length
1.	"Como la Flor"	A.B. Quintanilla, Pete Astudillo	Selena	3:02
2.	"Baraja de Oro"	Ramón Ayala	Graciela Beltrán	2:30
3.	"No Debes Jugar"	A.B., Astudillo	Selena	2:48
4.	"Pilares de Cristal"	Vicente Torres Muñoz	Beltrán	2:05
5.	"Bidi Bidi Bom Bom"	Selena, Astudillo	Selena	3:27
6.	"Tú Me Dijiste Adiós"	Juan Gabriel	Beltrán	2:45
7.	"La Llamada"	A.B., Astudillo	Selena	2:50
8.	"Mi Triunfo"	Jorge "Güiro" Borrego	Beltrán	2:49
9.	"¿Qué Creías?"	A.B., Astudillo	Selena	3:30
10.	"Tu Recado"	Pedro Rivera	Beltrán	2:01
11.	"La Carcacha"	A.B., Astudillo	Selena	4:09
12.	"Morena y Delgadita"	Rivera	Beltrán	3:05
Total length:				58:14

== Personnel ==
Credits are adapted from the liner notes of Las Reinas del Pueblo.

Musicians

- Graciela Beltrán – lead vocals
- Selena – lead vocals
- Ricky Vela – keyboardist
- Joe Ojeda – keyboardist
- Chris Pérez – guitarist
- Suzette Quintanilla – drums

Production

- A.B. Quintanilla – producer, arranger, remixer
- Roberto Guadarrama – producer
- Ramon Lopez Alvarado – arranger
- George G. Rivas – arranger
- Brian "Red" Moore – audio mixer

== Charts ==
1995 weekly chart performance for Las Reinas del Pueblo
Chart (1995)	Peak position
US Billboard 200 (Billboard)	147
US Top Latin Albums (Billboard)	5
US Regional Mexican Albums (Billboard)	5

2010 weekly chart performance for Las Reinas del Pueblo
Chart (2010)	Peak position
Spain (PROMUSICAE)	10

== See also ==
- 1995 in Latin music
- Latin American music in the United States
- Women in Latin music

== Works cited ==
- "Top Latin Albums > April 15, 1995". Billboard. Vol. 107, no. 15. April 15, 1995.
- "Top Latin Albums > April 22, 1995". Billboard. Vol. 107, no. 16. April 22, 1995.
- "Las Reinas del Pueblo - Selena : Songs, Reviews, Credits, Awards". AllMusic.
- "'The People's Queen' At the Fair". Merced Sun-Star. July 14, 2003. p. Merced County Fair 8 – via Newspapers.com.
- "Diez Años sin Selena". Milenio (in Spanish) (389–396). Diario de Monterrey: 388–390. March 31, 2005.
- "Dímelo - Graciela Beltrán". Houston Chronicle (in Spanish). September 16, 2005.
- "Hits of The World > March 31, 2010". Billboard. March 31, 2010. Gale 7CA224100795.
- "Popular Latina Music Star Graciela Beltran Sues EMI Music, Inc. Over Royalties: Brings Class Action Through Her Attorneys". PR Newswire. February 29, 2012. Gale 7CA327675281.
- Quintanilla, Selena (1994). Amor Prohibido. EMI Latin (Media notes). A.B. Quintanilla (producer), Suzette Quintanilla (spoken liner notes producer). 724354099403.
- Beltrán, Graciela; Quintanilla, Selena (1995). Las Reinas del Pueblo. EMI Latin (Media notes). A.B. Quintanilla (producer).
- Blanco-Cano, Rosana; Urquijo-Ruiz, Rita E. (2011). Global Mexican cultural productions (1st ed.). Palgrave Macmillan. ISBN 978-0-230-37039-5.
- Burr, Ramiro (1999). The Billboard Guide to Tejano and Regional Mexican Music. Billboard books. ISBN 0-8230-7691-1.
- Burr, Ramiro (March 31, 2000). "Search continues for 'next Selena'". San Antonio Express-News. ProQuest 262130420.
- Burr, Ramiro; Shannon, Doug (2003). Encyclopedia Latina. Scholastic Library Publishing. ISBN 0717258157.
- Gamboa, Suzanne; Thatcher, Rebecca (April 2, 1995). "A Singer of Many Record Labels". Austin American-Statesman. p. A16 – via Newspapers.com.
- Garcia, Gus (July 26, 1993). "Selena, Sunny wow crowd". Del Rio News-Herald. p. 1 – via Newspapers.com.
- Jasinski, Laurie E. (2012). Handbook of Texas Music. Texas A&M University Press. ISBN 978-0-87611-297-7.
- Lannert, John (April 15, 1995). "Latin Notas". Billboard. Vol. 107, no. 15.
- Lannert, John (June 10, 1995). "A Retrospective". Billboard. Vol. 107, no. 23. Prometheus Global Media.
- Lannert, John (April 22, 1995). "Selena's albums soar; EMI rushes shipments". Billboard. Gale 7CA16873775.
- Maldonado, Vilma (July 22, 1994). "Artists Busy Touring, Releasing New Tejano Music". The Monitor. p. 22E – via Newspapers.com.
- Maldonado, Vilma (May 18, 2001). "International Singer Beltran Goes 'Banda'". The Monitor. p. 3F – via Newspapers.com.
- Muir, Pat (June 10, 2015). "Beach Boys top Central Washington State Fair". TCA Regional News. ProQuest 1687230779.
- Muir, Pat (September 24, 2015). "Fair acts range from country to rock, Tejano to pop". TCA Regional News. ProQuest 1718189508.
- Parédez, Deborah (2009). Selenidad: Selena, Latinos, and the Performance of Memory. Duke University Press. ISBN 978-0-8223-9089-3.
- Patoski, Joe Nick (1996). Selena: Como La Flor. Boston: Little Brown and Company. ISBN 0-316-69378-2.
- Patoski, Joe Nick (December 4, 2020). "Dance Away Your 2020 Blues With Selena's Best Songs". Elle.
- Pérez, Erwin (October 22, 1999). "Rostros Etc". El Nuevo Herald (in Spanish). p. 4C – via Newspapers.com.
- Ragland, Cathy (March 24, 1996). "With Respect". Austin American Statesmen. p. G6 – via Newspapers.com.
- Untiedt, Kenneth L. (2013). Cowboys, Cops, Killers, and Ghosts: Legends and Lore in Texas. University of North Texas Press. ISBN 978-1-57441-532-2.
- Verhovek, Sam Howe (April 1, 1995). "Grammy-Winning Singer Selena Killed in Shooting at Texas Motel". The New York Times. p. 1.
- Ybarra, Rose (March 31, 2005). "Selena's Death Reshaped Family's Life". The Monitor. pp. 1A, 8A – via Newspapers.com.
