= Treizième Étage =

- Origin: Canada
- Genres: Hip-hop, rap Quebec
- Years active: 2000--present
- Label: 13 Deep Recordz
- Members: Sans Pression, Cobna, Cast, 2Saï

Treizième Étage, or Thirteenth Floor in English, is a Canadian hip-hop group from Quebec. It is made up of Sans Pression, Cobna, Cast and 2Saï.

== Biography ==
Thirteenth Floor was formed in 2000 on the initiative of rapper Sans Pression. At the time a collective composed of several members, it was in 2004 that it became a group formed by the rappers Sans Pression, Cobna, and 2Saï (who collaborates to a lesser extent), as well as the producer and musical director Cast.

The group released their first official album, Asphalt in My District on 23 May 2006 on the 13 Deep Recordz label. Characterized by social critiques focused on current events, L'asphalte dans mon district is the trigger that Quebec rap is missing to take the place that is due to it locally and internationally. It contains songs like Rien de bon and Le coeur de Montréal, as well as Faut pas perder, a collaborative song with Patsy Gallant. The first video, that of the song La Terre tourne (in collaboration with moindre mesure Joe BG), directed by O. G. Malik and produced by 13 Deep, has been on Musique Plus since mid-May.

In March 2011, the group released their second album, T'inkiète. It contains productions from Lonik, Farfadet, Hotbox/HBee and Scorpio B. The same year, the group participated in the soundtrack of the video game Battlefield 3 published by EA Games, with their single Comme d'habita.In September 2011, the group was announced on the 9th at Bistro Laurier in Beloeil. At the beginning of 2012, the group published the video clip for the song Cinq Cent Quatorze from their album T'inkiète.

== Discography ==
- 2006: L'Asphalte dans mon district
- 2011: T'Inkiète
