= Criollo (band) =

Canadian Latin hip hop band

- Origin: Montreal, Quebec, Canada
- Genres: Bahire, Bachata, Latin, Hip hop, Reggae, Reggaeton
- Years active: 2003– present
- Label: One Island Music
- Members: Salvador "Sol" Valdez; Jose "Chiro" Mata; Alexis "El Gordo" Grullon; Gilbert "Giby" Capellan

Criollo is a Montreal-based latin, hip hop band. Their music, in the "Bahire" style (which they coined), draws from Bachata, hip hop, reggae, latin and R&B influences, and is sung in Spanish.

== History ==
Criollo formed in 2003, and included four members; Salvador "Sol" Valdez, Jose "Chiro" Mata, Alexis "El Gordo" Grullon and Gilbert "Giby" Capellan. These musicians also produced and mixed music videos, engineered their own songs in the studio and albums for other artists, including Sans Pression, and worked with BLESS, SAT, and Guru-Gangstarr. They have also been members of now defunct bands Zona-X, Ultimo Capitulo/Last Chapter, and Black Sunz.

In 2006, they released the album, Bahire which is distributed locally by SOPREF (La Société pour la promotion de la relève musicale de l’espace francophone). In 2009 the band performed in Toronto.

The band has performed at many world music festivals including Festival des Rythmes du Monde, and has been showcased on televised shows such as The Roof, Belle et Bum, and Teleritmo. It has opened for musicians such as Fat Joe, Tego Calderón, Elvis Crespo, N'Klabe, Aguakate, DJ IOP, José Alberto "El Canario" and IAM.

== Discography ==
- Bahire (2006)

== Music videos ==
- Calle
- Son Criollo
- Lo Que Quisiera
