= List of number-one albums of 1995 (Spain) =

The List of number-one albums of 1995 in Spain is derived from the Top 100 España record chart published weekly by PROMUSICAE (Productores de Música de España), a non-profit organization made up of Spanish and multinational record companies. This association tracks record sales (both physical and digital) in Spain.

== Albums ==
Week	Chart Date	Album	Artist	Reference
1	January 2	Laura Pausini	Laura Pausini	
2	January 9	Laura Pausini	Laura Pausini	
3	January 16	Laura Pausini	Laura Pausini	
4	January 23	Laura Pausini	Laura Pausini	
5	January 30	No Need to Argue	The Cranberries	
6	February 6	Laura Pausini	Laura Pausini	
7	February 13	Laura Pausini	Laura Pausini	
8	February 20	No Need to Argue	The Cranberries	
9	February 27	Greatest Hits	Bruce Springsteen	
10	March 6	Greatest Hits	Bruce Springsteen	
11	March 13	Greatest Hits	Bruce Springsteen	
12	March 20	Greatest Hits	Bruce Springsteen	
13	March 27	Greatest Hits	Bruce Springsteen	
14	April 3	No Need to Argue	The Cranberries	
15	April 10	No Need to Argue	The Cranberries	
16	April 17	No Need to Argue	The Cranberries	
17	April 24	No Need to Argue	The Cranberries	
18	May 1	No Need to Argue	The Cranberries	
19	May 8	Alejandro Sanz 3	Alejandro Sanz	
20	May 15	Alejandro Sanz 3	Alejandro Sanz	
21	May 22	Alejandro Sanz 3	Alejandro Sanz	
22	May 29	Cosas Mías	Antonio Flores	
23	June 5	Cosas Mías	Antonio Flores	
24	June 12	Cosas Mías	Antonio Flores	
25	June 19	Cosas Mías	Antonio Flores	
26	June 26	La Carretera	Julio Iglesias	
27	July 3	La Carretera	Julio Iglesias	
28	July 10	La Carretera	Julio Iglesias	
29	July 17	La Carretera	Julio Iglesias	
30	July 24	La Carretera	Julio Iglesias	
31	July 31	La Carretera	Julio Iglesias	
32	August 7	La Carretera	Julio Iglesias	
33	August 14	Cosas Mías	Antonio Flores	
34	August 21	Cosas Mías	Antonio Flores	
35	August 28	Cosas Mías	Antonio Flores	
36	September 4	La Rebelión de los Hombres Rana	El Último de la Fila	
37	September 11	La Rebelión de los Hombres Rana	El Último de la Fila	
38	September 18	Avalancha	Héroes del Silencio	
39	September 25	La Rebelión de los Hombres Rana	El Último de la Fila	
40	October 2	Abriendo Puertas	Gloria Estefan	
41	October 9	Abriendo Puertas	Gloria Estefan	
42	October 16	Abriendo Puertas	Gloria Estefan	
43	October 23	Abriendo Puertas	Gloria Estefan	
44	October 30	Abriendo Puertas	Gloria Estefan	
45	November 6	Made in Heaven	Queen	
46	November 13	50 Aniversario	Nino Bravo	
47	November 20	Made in Heaven	Queen	
48	November 27	50 Aniversario	Nino Bravo	
49	December 4	50 Aniversario	Nino Bravo	
50	December 11	The Memory of Trees	Enya	
51	December 18	The Memory of Trees	Enya	
52	December 25	Abriendo Puertas	Gloria Estefan	

== See also ==
- List of number-one singles of 1995 (Spain)
