= Dominican Republic–United Kingdom relations =

- Dominican Republic: United Kingdom

Diplomatic mission
- Embassy of the Dominican Republic, London: Embassy of the United Kingdom, Santo Domingo

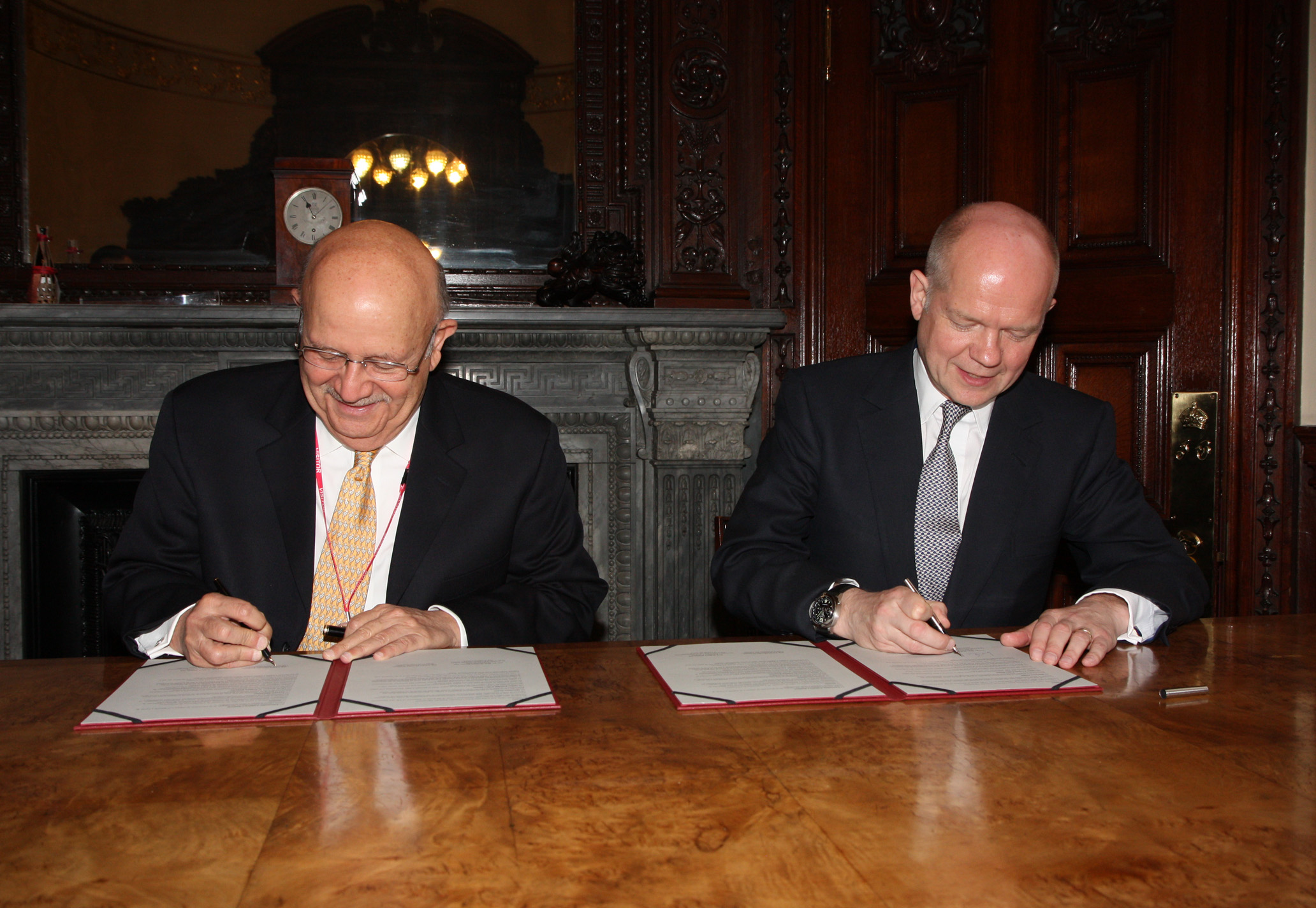
Dominican Republic Foreign Minister Carlos Morales Troncoso with British Foreign Secretary William Hague in London, June 2012.

Dominican Republics–United Kingdom relations encompass the international and bilateral relations between the Dominican Republic and the United Kingdom of Great Britain and Northern Ireland. The two countries established diplomatic relations on 6 March 1850 following the Domincan-British Treaty of 1850. The United Kingdom was the first country to recognise and establish diplomatic relations with the Dominican Republic.

Both countries share common membership of the Atlantic Co-operation Pact, the International Criminal Court, the United Nations, and the World Trade Organization, as well as the CARIFORUM–UK Economic Partnership Agreement. Bilaterally the two countries have a Maritime Boundary Agreement.

== Economic relations ==
From 29 December 2008 until 30 December 2020, trade between the Dominican Republic and the UK was governed by the CARIFORUM–European Union Economic Partnership Agreement, while the United Kingdom was a member of the European Union.

Following the withdrawal of the United Kingdom from the European Union, the UK and the CARIFORUM states signed the CARIFORUM–United Kingdom Economic Partnership Agreement on 22 March 2019, with the Dominican Republic signing on 4 April 2019. The CARIFORUM–UK Economic Partnership Agreement is a continuity trade agreement, based on the EU free trade agreement, which entered into force on 1 January 2021. Trade value between the CARIFORUM states and the United Kingdom was worth £5,108 million in 2022.

== Diplomatic missions ==
- Dominican Republic maintains an embassy in London.
- The United Kingdom is accredited to Dominican Republic from its embassy in Santo Domingo.

== See also ==
- CARIFORUM–United Kingdom Economic Partnership Agreement
- Foreign relations of the Dominican Republic
- Foreign relations of the United Kingdom
- Latin America–United Kingdom relations
