= Revolution of the chaucha =

1949 demonstration in Chile

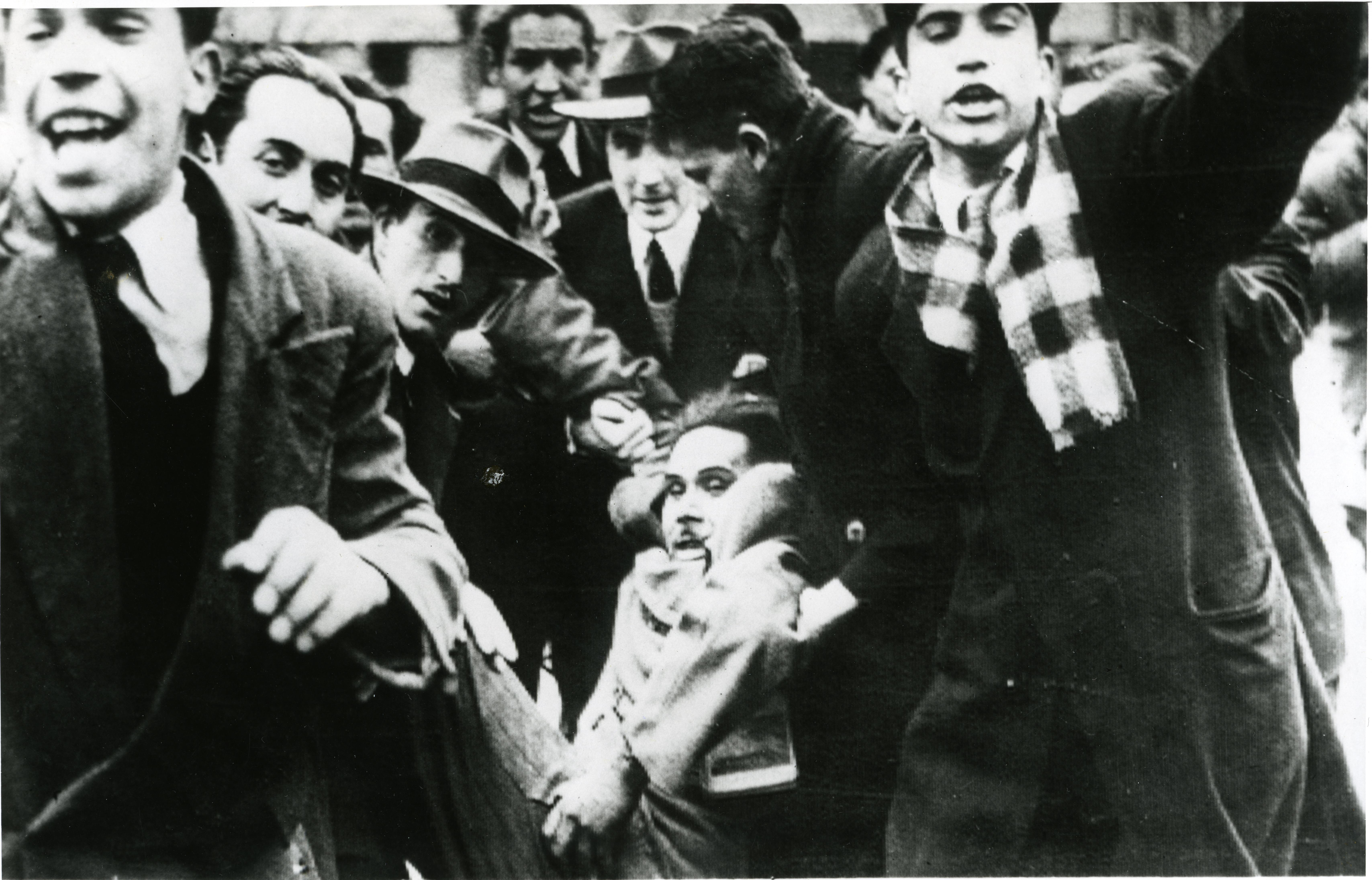
- Protestors carry a man injured by the Carabineros
- Native name: Revolución de la chaucha
- Date: 16-17 August 1949
- Location: Santiago, Chile
- Cause: Increase in the price of public transport tickets
- Target: Decrease in the price of the tickets
- Participants: Students, workers
- Outcome: Violent repression of the protests Price of tickets restored
- Deaths: 4-30
- Injuries: >100

The revolution of the chaucha (Spanish: revolución de la chaucha) was a demonstration held on August 16 and 17, 1949, in Santiago, Chile, against the proposed increase in the price of public transport tickets by 20 cents of the Chilean peso (a "chaucha" in the Chilean slang).

== Background ==
In 1949, the period of radical governments, which began in 1938 with the victory of the Popular Front, was entering a rapid decline. In 1946 Gabriel González Videla came to power, who had the support of the Communist Party and whose campaign leader was the poet Pablo Neruda. However, as a product of the Cold War that was beginning, González Videla cut the alliance with the communists in mid-1947, and later, in 1948, he promulgated the Law of Permanent Defense of Democracy that outlawed the Communist Party and persecuted Neruda. After the departure of the communists from the government, President González Videla was unable to maintain sufficient political support to establish stable cabinets. In August 1947 he was forced to organize an "administration cabinet", which included members of the military and independent politicians, sometimes right-wing, such as Jorge Alessandri, who took over as Finance Minister. Thus, the government ended up relying on right-wing political forces.

One of the main tasks of Alessandri was to stop inflation, for which he applied measures to stabilize wages and salaries, although he did not change the price controls of basic necessities. He finally managed to stop the inflation, but at the cost of earning the hostility of several unions that started a wave of strikes.

== Main events ==
On August 12, 1949, the government decided to increase the price of the collective locomotion ticket by 0.2 pesos or 20 cents ("a chaucha"), going from 1.4 to 1.6 pesos. Four days later, on August 16, the students went out to protest in the streets of Santiago, supported by employees and workers.

The protest included students, workers, employees and housewives – who demanded a reduction in the price of transportation to $1, using the slogan “Micros for one peso”. Barricades were set up, stones were thrown, cars and buses were burned and overturned, and power lines were knocked down. By order of the Government of González Videla, Carabineros and members of the Army attacked the demonstrators disproportionately, leaving more than one hundred injured and an indeterminate number of deaths, ranging between 4 and 30 people.

The revolt dissolved after two days of protest.

== Aftermath ==
The government was strongly affected by the revolt, and was forced to revoke the increase in the price of transport. In addition, the president made a cabinet change on February 7, 1950, including Finance Minister Jorge Alessandri, who was replaced by Arturo Maschke.

This movement has been considered to have been the basis for the creation of the Comité Unido de Obreros (CUO), an antecedent for the creation of the Central Única de Trabajadores (CUT) in 1953.

== See also ==
- Battle of Santiago (1957)
- Jornadas de Protesta Nacional
- 2019-2022 Chilean protests
