= Graciela Beltrán =

American singer

- Also known as: La Reina Del Pueblo
- Born: Graciela López Beltrán; December 29, 1974 (age 51); Los Angeles, California, U.S.
- Genres: Regional Mexican, Latin pop
- Occupation: Singer
- Years active: 1984–present
- Labels: Fonovisa/Univision, EMI Latin, Fonovisa/Universal, GB Music, Cintas Acuario

Graciela Beltrán (born December 29, 1974) is an American singer. She began singing in the Los Angeles area at the age of six at restaurants and parties. According to MTV she is "widely known as one of regional Mexican music's most influential female voices. Beltran is credited with helping to form the genre, as well as solidifying a woman's place in it."

Beltrán was included on the album Las Reinas del Pueblo, with famous Mexican-American singer Selena, which has sold over five million copies worldwide.

== Early life ==
While some sources give her place of birth as Sinaloa, in a small town called Costa Rica, Beltrán stated in an interview that she was born on U.S. soil. She began her music career entertaining the neighbors, who were her first followers. She has faced various family tragedies including the kidnapping of her brother whose body was never found, the murder of her brother-in-law and was even a witness to her step-father's killing when she was nine.

It was in Los Angeles where Beltrán's music career took off when she first stepped onto a professional stage. Under the name Gracielita Beltran, she began recording albums of norteño, banda and mariachi music with local musicians. Four years later, Beltran was noticed by record execs at EMI, who offered to produce her next record. "Baraja de Oro" was one of the first singles from the six albums Beltran recorded with EMI. At the 8th and 9th Lo Nuestro Awards, Beltran was nominated for Regional Mexican Female Singer of the Year.

== Career ==
Aside from the many awards, Graciela Beltrán is also proud of the many professional collaborations she has participated in during her career. These include duets with Ednita Nazario, Emilio Navaira, Los Tucanes de Tijuana, Chalino Sánchez, Adán Sánchez, Banda Machos, Grupo Modelo, Conjunto Primavera and recently with El Chapo de Sinaloa. Her compilation album with Selena, 'La Reina Del TexMex', titled Las Reinas Del Pueblo has sold 5 million copies worldwide. She has also worked with well-known and respected producers such as Juan Carlos Calderon, K.C. Porter, Bebu Silvetti, Los Cuates Omar y Adolfo Valenzuela and Joan Sebastian. She has shared the stage with Vicente Fernández among many other successful artists. In 2006, Graciela was the special guest for the Cinco de Mayo celebrations that year after year are held at the White House, in this occasion, she shared her talent and music in front of the President of the United States George W. Bush. She has racked up five film appearances and a discography with 20 original titles, the latter half of them with the Mexican Univision label. Her career consists of appearances in Sábado Gigante, Siempre en Domingo and various shows around the world.

After nearly four years of absence in the Recording Industry Graciela Beltran returned in 2014 with her own record label and three new productions One Album Excitos with Mariachi "Homenaje A La Voz Ranchera, Another Album with Banda Sinaloense with All new songs and finally a CD/DVD with Live Banda Sinaloense, Mariachi and Pop/Rock group.

Currently, 2013-2014 Promoting her New Upcoming Albums in her Extensive Tour in the U.S. and Mexico has been Accompanied by her Banda Sinaloense and Mariachi.

2004 Premio Las Palmas de Oro como "La mejor cantante de música de Banda en México".

2004 Premio Micrófono de Oro como "Cantante juvenil más destacada en música de Banda", otorgado por la Asociación Nacional de Locutores en México y La Fundación Guillermo Romo.

Cintas Acuario Records 2007 Premio Lo Nuestro A La Trayectoria por sus 20 años en la música Regional Mexicana.

As of 2017, Beltrán has released 26 albums throughout her career.

== Discography ==
Albums

- 1987: Gracielita Beltrán
- 1988: Gracielita Beltrán – 16 exitos'
- 1989: La Estrellita de Sinaloa
- 1989: Revelación Ranchero
- 1989: La Pochita de Sinaloa
- 1990: Gracielita Beltrán con la Banda Culiacán
- 1991: Graciela Beltrán - Voy a morir por ti - con Mariachi
- 1992: Juntos Cantan a México con Mariachi con Chalino Sánchez
- 1993: Mis Mejores Canciones – 17 Super Exitos
- 1993: Graciela Beltrán con la Banda Santa Cruz
- 1994: 12 Super Exitos
- 1995: Tesoro
- 1995: Las Reinas del Pueblo con Selena
- 1995: Te Sigo Extrañando a dúo con Grupo Modelo - Single
- 1996: Mi Corazón Es Tuyo
- 1996: Graciela Beltrán y Los Tucanes de Tijuana - Single
- 1997: Tuya - con Mariachi
- 1998: La Reina Del Pueblo con Banda y Mariachi
- 1998: Robame Un Beso - Producido por Joan Sebastian
- 1998: Graciela Beltrán con Banda – Grandes y Nuevos Exitos
- 1998: Navidad Para Mi Pueblo - Junto con otros artistas
- 1999: Graciela Beltrán con Banda – Grandes y Nuevos Exitos Volumen 2
- 1999: La Reina Del Pueblo con Banda
- 2000: La Reyna Del Pueblo 2000
- 2001: Para Mi Pueblo
- 2001: Esto Es Lo Nuestro
- 2002: A Los Grandes
- 2003: No Me Arrepiento De Nada
- 2003: Graciela Beltrán – La Historia - Incluye 10 Videos
- 2004: Mi Otro Sentimiento
- 2006: Rancherisimas con Banda
- 2007: Promesas No
- 2007: Mujeres Bravas
- 2008: Una Reina En Hollywood
- 2009: La Reina De La Banda
- 2014: Homenaje A La Voz Ranchera
- 2017: Évitame La Pena

== Filmography ==
- 1990 Ni Parientes Somos as Herself
- 1991 El Corrido De Los Perez as Herself
- 1994 La Reina de las Bandas as Herself
- 1994 La Quebradita as Herself
- 2009 ‘’Mas Sabe El Diablo’’ as Herself
- 2014 Tongue Tied as Marielena

=== Music videos ===
Year	Name	Album	Ref
1993	Pilares De Cristal	Graciela Beltran Con La Banda Santa Cruz	
1995	Tesoro	Tesoro	
1995	Están Lloviendo Lágrimas	Tesoro	
1998	Róbame Un Beso	Róbame Un Beso	
2001	Sigue Tu Ruta	Para Mi Pueblo	
2003	Que Dificil Es	No Me Arrepiento De Nada	
2004	Dile A Ella	Mi Otro Sentimiento	
2004	Corazón Encadenado	Mi Otro Sentimiento	
2005	¿A Donde Fue El Amor?	Mi Otro Sentimiento	
2005	Que Pena	No Me Arrepiento De Nada	
2005	No Me Pregunten Por Él	Rancherísimas Con Banda	
2007	Es Cosa De Él	Promesas No	
2007	O Ella O Yo	Promesas No	
2009	Ya No Supe Amar	La Reina De La Banda	
2017	Evitame La Pena	Evitame La Pena	
