= Jacinto de Castro =

26th President of the Dominican Republic (1878–1878)

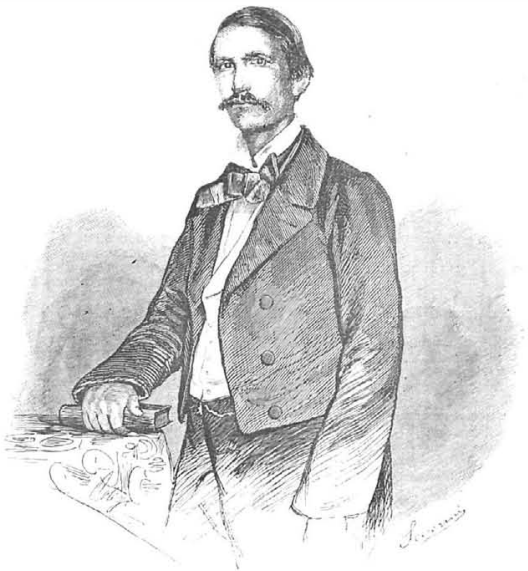
- Illustration of Jacinto de Castro

26th President of the Dominican Republic
- In office September 7, 1878 – September 29, 1878
- Preceded by: Ignacio María González
- Succeeded by: Cesareo Guillermo

Personal details
- Born: August 15, 1811 Santo Domingo, Captaincy General of Santo Domingo
- Died: December 13, 1896 (aged 85) Santo Domingo, Dominican Republic
- Spouse: Maria de la Concepción y Lara Suazo
- Children: 4

Jacinto del Rosario de Castro (August 15, 1811 – November 13, 1896) was a Dominican politician who served as the 26th President of the Dominican Republic from September 7, 1878 until September 29 of that year.

== Early years ==
Jacinto de Castro was born on August 15, 1811 in Santo Domingo, he was the natural son of Dolores Ana de Castro Urrutia, who in turn was the daughter of Juan María de Castro Guzmán and Mercedes de Urrutia Fox. The name of the father is unknown. He was baptized on August 27 of that same year in the Cathedral of Santo Domingo with the name of Jacinto del Rosario de Castro.

A lawyer by profession, he lived in Baní, where he took an active part in the actions of the Dominican War of Independence.

== Political career ==
His leadership qualities earned him positions of importance in the nation, including: deputy, plenipotentiary, prosecutor of the Supreme Court of Justice and minister of Justice and Public Instruction.

He was a founding member in 1846 of the patriotic society Friends of the Country, however, in 1861, he supported the annexation to Spain.

He served as president of the Supreme Court of Justice when on September 2, 1878, the President of the Dominican Republic, Ignacio María González, resigned his position, a situation that caused him to constitutionally provisionally occupy the first magistracy of the nation, to, within the deadlines established by the Constitution, call for the election of the definitive replacement for President González.

Upon assuming the Presidency, Jacinto de Castro organized a Provisional Government until elections were held to choose the new Head of State.

As Secretary of Justice and Public Instruction, he appointed Alejandro Angulo Guridi; Pedro M. Aristy, of Finance and Commerce, and Pedro Guillermo, Minister of War and Navy and in charge of the Ministry of Foreign Affairs.

As delegate of the Cibao Cabinet, he appointed General Ulises Heureaux.

On September 29 of the same year, Jacinto de Castro resigned from the presidency of the Republic. He took the reins of the country through a Council of Secretaries of State, until February 27, 1879, when Cesáreo Guillermo was elected.

== Personal life ==
Jacinto de Castro married María de la Concepción de Lara Suazo, daughter of Juan Bautista de Lara Pérez and María Salomé Suazo Arias, in Baní on June 3, 1835. They had four children:

- Apolinar de Castro de Lara, who was born in Santo Domingo on July 23, 1836. Lawyer, annexationist and fiscal attorney of San Cristóbal. He married Virginia Gómez Alfau, daughter of Fernando Joaquín Gómez Grateró and María Guadalupe Alfau Bustamante. They fathered: Heriberto Rafael (b. 1864); Lea (1865-1906), prominent philanthropist, and Publio de Castro Gómez (1866-1879). Apolinar died in Santo Domingo on November 20, 1889.
- Juan Pablo de Castro de Lara, who was born in Santo Domingo around 1839. He married Carmen Pérez and they were the parents of Carmen and Lucila de Castro Pérez. Juan Pablo died in 1881 in Santo Domingo.
- Teresa de Castro de Lara, who was born in Santo Domingo on July 21, 1841. She married on January 4, 1862, Manuel María Pellerano Bonetti (1837-1894), son of Giovanni Battista Pellerano Costa and María del Carmen Bonetti Garo. They procreated: Manuel de Jesús (b. 1862); Arturo Bautista (1864-1916), poet, better known as Lord Byron; Luis Armando (b. 1867); Eva (1869-1945), educator; Luisa Ozema (1870-1927), notable teacher, and María Mercedes Lucila Pellerano Castro (b.1872). Of this generation, both Eva and Luisa Ozema stood out notably in education, both having graduated from the Instituto de Señoritas, whose director was Salomé Ureña. Teresa died in Santo Domingo on March 14, 1897.
- José María de Castro de Lara, who was born around 1843. He married María Antonia Justina del Monte Yepes, daughter of the hero Félix María del Monte Fernández de Castro and Clementina Yepes. They fathered: José María, María Concepción (b. 1874), Jacinto Rafael (1876-1929), Mercedes Clementina (b. 1879), Luis Publio (1881-1944) and Celia de Castro del Monte. José María died in Santo Domingo in 1885.

According to the oral tradition of the Mañón family, Juana Francisca Mañón had eight children with Jacinto de Castro. They are these: Jacinto Mañón (b. 1868), Juan Francisco Mañón (b. 1869), Darío Mañón, Mario Mañón, Ercilia Mañón, Jorge Rogelio Mañón (b. 1877), Ana Graciela Mañón (b. 1879) and Luis Enrique Gregorio Mañón (b. 1881).

Likewise, the oral tradition of the García family also attributes two sons of Monserrat García to Jacinto de Castro. These are Mercedes García, born around 1853, and Ramón María García.

== Death ==
Jacinto de Castro died in Santo Domingo, on December 13, 1896 at the old age 85.

== Sources ==
- http://enciclopediadominicana.org/Jacinto_de_Castro
- https://vanguardiadelpueblo.do/1878/09/jacinto-de-castro-es-juramentado-presidente-de-la-republica/
- https://www.idg.org.do/capsulas/abril2009/abril200925.htm
