= Manuel Pareja Obregón =

Spanish musician and composer

Manuel Pareja Obregón (4 May 1933 – 24 July 1995) was a Spanish musician and composer who focused on Andalusian folk music. He married three times and had two children. He died of leukemia at 62 years.
