= Angel Villalona =

Dominican baseball player (born 1990)

- First baseman
- Born: August 13, 1990 (age 36); La Romana, Dominican Republic
- Bats: Right Throws: Right
- Stats at Baseball Reference

Angel Miguel Villalona (born August 13, 1990) is a Dominican professional baseball first baseman. He has been rated by many baseball websites as the San Francisco Giants' No. 1 prospect.

== Career ==
=== San Francisco Giants ===
In August 2006, the San Francisco Giants gave Villalona a club-record $2.1 million signing bonus. In 2007, they assigned him to extended spring training with the idea of sending him to rookie or short-season ball later in the minor league season. He was then assigned to the Arizona Giants of the Rookie-level Arizona League as a 3rd baseman, hitting .264 and with an OPS in excess of .800 through July 30, 2007. Villalona played 2008 with the Augusta GreenJackets of the Single–A South Atlantic League, and was named to the 2008 All-Star Futures Game. He played the year with the San Jose Giants of the High–A California League.

On November 19, 2011, the Giants added Villalona to their 40-man roster to avoid exposing him to the Rule 5 draft. He was subsequently optioned to San Jose in March 2012 and placed back on the restricted list in April. The Giants reported on February 8, 2013, that Villalona's visa to come to the United States had been approved, and that once he arrived at their spring training camp at Scottsdale, the team would apply to the league for his reinstatement from the restricted list.

Villalona played 44 games for the Dominican Summer League Giants in 2012, batting .303, hitting seven home runs, and driving in 34 runs. In 2013, he played for San Jose, and played in the all-star game. He played for the Richmond Flying Squirrels of the Double–A Eastern League in the 2013 and 2014 seasons. He also played the 2014 season with Richmond. After the 2014 season, the Giants outrighted Villalona off of their 40-man roster. He played the 2015 season with San Jose.

Villalona spent the 2016 campaign back with Richmond, batting .143/.250/.232 with one home run and five RBI across 24 games. He elected free agency following the season on November 7, 2016.

=== Guelph Royals ===
On June 27, 2018, Villalona signed with the Guelph Royals of the Intercounty Baseball League. In five games for the team, he went 8–for–22 (.364) with three RBI. Villalona played for the team during the 2019 season as well, batting .345 with seven home runs and 27 RBI across 36 games. The team was eliminated from the playoffs during both seasons.

== Personal life ==
On September 20, 2009, the Dominican Republic police announced that Villalona was a suspect in the murder of Mario Felix de Jesus Velete. He turned himself in, and could have faced up to 20 years in prison if convicted.

In November 2009, Villalona was released on bond but still faced a murder charge. The victim's family asked a judge to drop the case, prompting his release, which appears related to a reported monetary settlement of approximately $139,000 that Villalona reached with the family of Mario Felix de Jesus Velete. He would have stayed in jail awaiting arraignment on the charge without the settlement, but the prosecutor still planned to pursue the case. He appeared in court for a preliminary hearing on April 27, 2010, to determine whether the case would go to trial. He was then free on bond, but his U.S. visa was subsequently revoked.

The charge against him was dropped due to lack of evidence. According to USA Today, the prosecutor said that "his star witness, a friend who accompanied the deceased person to the bar, disappeared after Villalona paid the victim's family to avoid a civil lawsuit". As well, Villalona had friends who had been at the scene vouching for his innocence. Villalona filed suit against the Giants for breach of contract in a Dominican court in early 2011, but settled the case out of court when the team reinstated him to its farm system. Villalona resumed professional play with the Dominican Summer League in June 2012.
