= Dominican Republic–United Kingdom Maritime Boundary Agreement =

British-Dominican 1996 treaty

Dominican Republic – United Kingdom Maritime Boundary Agreement
Agreement between the Government of the United Kingdom of Great Britain and Northern Ireland and the Government of the Dominican Republic concerning the delimitation of the Maritime Boundary between the Dominican Republic and the Turks and Caicos Islands
- Type: Boundary delimitation
- Signed: 2 August 1996
- Parties: Dominican Republic; United Kingdom
- Depositary: United Nations Secretariat
- Language: English; Spanish

The Dominican Republic – United Kingdom Maritime Boundary Agreement is a 1996 treaty between the Dominican Republic and the United Kingdom which delimits the maritime boundary between the Dominican Republic and the British territory of the Turks and Caicos Islands.

The treaty was signed on 2 August 1996. The text of the treaty establishes a boundary that runs roughly east–west and is actually north (closer to the Turks and Caicos) of the equidistant line between the two territories. The boundary is 283 nautical miles long and consists of four straight-line maritime segments defined by five individual coordinate points. The far western point of the border is a tripoint with Haiti.

The treaty has not yet come into force because it has not been ratified by both states. The full name of the treaty is Agreement between the Government of the United Kingdom of Great Britain and Northern Ireland and the Government of the Dominican Republic concerning the delimitation of the Maritime Boundary between the Dominican Republic and the Turks and Caicos Islands.
