= 12 Super Éxitos =

Greatest hits album by Selena
- Released: October 18, 1994
- Recorded: 1990–1994
- Genre: Tejano, Latin pop
- Label: EMI
- Producer: A.B. Quintanilla

Selena chronology
Amor Prohibido (1994)	12 Super Éxitos (1994)	Las Reinas del Pueblo (1995)

12 Super Éxitos is a compilation of Selena's greatest hits released in 1994 by EMI Latin. It was the last album released before her murder on March 31, 1995. After its release, Selena began working on her crossover album, which was set to be released in the summer of 1995.

== Track listing ==
1. "Si Una Vez"
2. "La Llamada"
3. "No Debes Jugar”
4. "Las Cadenas"
5. “Techno Cumbia"
6. "Tú Robaste Mi Corazón" (with Emilio Navaira)
7. "Bidi Bidi Bom Bom"
8. "No Quiero Saber"
9. "La Carcacha"
10. "Missing My Baby"
11. "Como la Flor"
12. "¿Qué Creías?"

== Charts ==
=== Weekly charts ===
Chart (1995)	Peak position
US Top Latin Albums	2
US Latin Regional Mexican Albums	2
US Billboard 200	64

=== Certifications ===
Region	Certification	Certified units/sales
United States (RIAA)	Gold	500,000^{^}
^{^} Shipments figures based on certification alone.
