= Battle of Santiago (1957) =

Protests in Chile

The Battle of Santiago (also known as the "events of April 2") was the name given to the protests of April 2–3, 1957 in Santiago, Chile that ended with violent confrontations between protesters and the police. The street battles resulted in 16 deaths after which the government deployed the army to the streets.

== Background ==
During the second government of Carlos Ibáñez del Campo (1952-1958), the country suffered an economic crisis that was not controlled, despite the economic measures taken. Faced with this situation, the government hired a group of economists called the Klein-Sacks mission, which proposed more liberal measures to be adopted, in open contrast to the protectionist policy established until then.

Among other things, Klein-Sacks proposed freezing wage increases and eliminating price control of some goods. The Ibáñez government adopted some of these measures provoking the discomfort of the population. What triggered the crisis was the rise in the rate of public transport. Faced with this situation, the main trade union organizations, headed by the Central Única de Trabajadores, called for a great national mobilization on April 2 and 3 of that year. A little earlier, in Valparaíso, there was a march that ended in clashes with the Carabineros. More clashes occurred the following days. The impressive barricades on the night of Saturday the 30th in Valparaíso were accompanied by a festive spirit. The press denounced the protestors as "groups of drunkards". Against the multitude of enraged proletarians the State responded with shootings against the crowd.

== The protests and consequent massacre ==
The mobilization in Santiago had the support of trade unions, student centers and other social organizations, as well as parties such as Frente de Acción Popular. Unlike what happened in Valparaíso, the mobilization in Santiago developed spontaneously, with people arriving from different parts of the city and uniting along the way. Thus, the mobilization came to have close to 20 thousand people in the center of the capital. Some riots soon started. Police intervened, but the riots did not end, rather they worsened. Hundreds of people attacked and destroyed various commercial premises, public transportation vehicles, and other public and private property.

The government decided to temporarily suspend the sessions of Congress and declared a state of siege, taking to the streets several army units under the command of general Humberto Gamboa, who joined the police and confronted the protesters.

At nightfall of the 2nd of April, general Gamboa reported that the day had left 16 dead and nearly 500 wounded. At 2:15 a.m. on Wednesday, April 3, the Horizonte printing press was robbed. At that time, twenty workers and the editor on duty, journalist Elmo Catalán Avilés, worked in it.

== Consequences ==
The following day, police raided and seized elements of press media opposed to the government. Days later, the government was given extraordinary powers by Congress, which allowed it to detain and relegate opposition leaders.

The Battle of Santiago gave a fatal blow to the Ibáñez government, who saw his political career practically end with these events. Likewise, it meant the starting point for parties such as the Socialist Party of Chile to abandon the conciliatory and unifying policy that placed it within the center-left of the political spectrum, turning it towards a more confrontational and radicalized position, approaching the Communist Party and Marxism, with which it had had strong differences in the past. Other parties, like the radical, began to suffer internal divisions.

== See also ==
- Jornadas de Protesta Nacional
- 2019-2022 Chilean protests
- Revolution of the chaucha
