= Sans Pression =

Canadian rapper

- Origin: Quebec, Canada
- Genres: Hip hop

Kamenga Mbikay (born 1976), known as Sans Pression, is a Canadian rapper from Quebec. He is a member of hip hop band Treizième Étage. Sans Pression later became the solo project of SP.

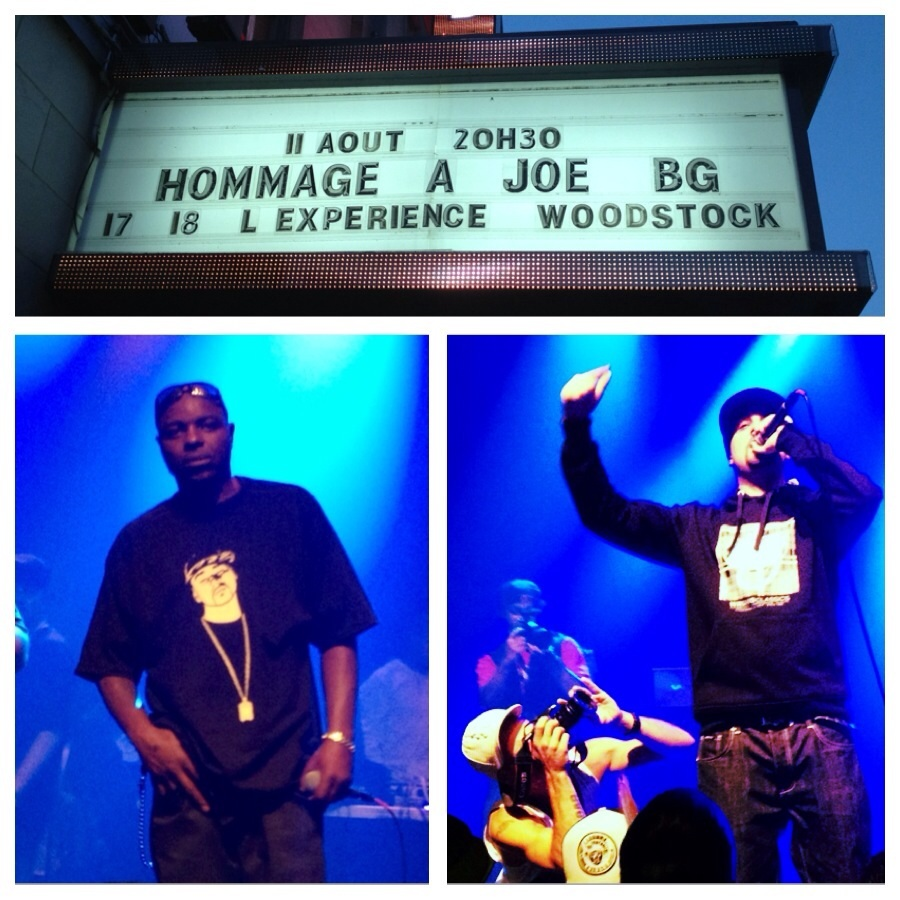
Sans Pression

== History ==
SP was born in Buffalo, New York, to Congolese parents, and; he grew up in Sherbrooke, Saint-Bruno-de-Montarville and Montreal. He formed the Sans Pression group along with his a Haitian friend, Jean-Philippe Guillaume, known as Ti-Kid, in 1997. Their performances featured heavier beats and stronger lyrics than were the norm for Quebec hip hop at the time. Their single "Numero 1" is used as one of Georges St-Pierre's UFC entrance themes.

Their first album, entitled 514-50 dans mon réseau (514-50 in my networks, 514 being an area code of Montreal and 450 for Greater Montreal (excluding Montreal)), was released in 1999 and sold over 45,000 copies; the album was unusual in that the lyrics combined English and French. The pair proceeded go on tour together until a fallout led to their separation. Ti-Kid left Quebec in order to pursue Creole rap projects.

SP continued to perform and record under the name Sans Pression. A second SP album, Répliques aux ofusqués (Response to the Outraged) was made and released without Ti-Kid in 2003. In 2007, SP took part in a tour called "93 tours". He organized a compilation project, XIII Deep, in collaboration with various Montreal rappers, including Jonathan Beaupré Guilbault.

In 2008, the Sans Pression album La Tendance Se Maintient was nominated as hip hop album of the year at the ADISQ awards. In 2010, Sans Pression performed with Yvon Krevé at the Francofolies. In 2017, he was once more featured at this festival.

== Discography ==
- 514-50 Dans Mon Réseau
- Répliques Aux Offusqués
- XIII Deep (compilation)
- Treizième Étage: L'asphalte Dans Mon District
- La Tendance Se Maintient
- Vagabond Ma Religion
- SP Micro Drive-By
- French Amerikkka
