= Battle of Santiago (1660) =

Date	29 March 1660
Location	Santiago de los Caballeros
Result	French victory

Belligerents
Dominican militia	(Kingdom of France) French buccaneers

Commanders and leaders
Unknown	Delisle

Casualties and losses
Unknown	10 killed 6 wounded

The Battle of Santiago (1660) was an engagement between Dominican militia and French buccaneers.

== Conflict ==
Pirates out of Tortuga attacked the Dominican town of Santiago de los Caballeros on March 27, 1660. Some 25 or 30 Spaniards were killed outright during their initial onslaught. After ransacking the town, they departed with a number of hostages on March 29, 1660. Several hundred Dominican militia cavalrymen had in the interim managed to rally from throughout the district, and prepared an ambush ahead of the French column. The leading two buccaneers were shot dead and a two-hour firefight ensued, before the Dominicans finally broke.

== See also ==
- Battle of Sabana Real
- Dominican-French War
