= Norteño (band) =

- Origin: Ottawa, Ontario, Canada
- Genre: Tango
- Years active: 1993–present
- Members: Pierre-Paul Provencher; Laurie Rosewarne; Geneviève Petit; Rémi Barrette; Tobias Meis
- Website: www.norteno.ca

Norteño is a Canadian "Tango nuevo" quintet from Ottawa, Ontario. It consists of Pierre-Paul Provencher (bandoneon), Laurie Rosewarne (piano), Geneviève Petit (violin), Rémi Barrette (electric guitar), and Tobias Meis (double bass).

== History ==
Norteño was started by Pierre-Paul Provencher and Laurie Rosewarne in 1993. Norteño plays a lot of music by Ástor Piazzolla, as well as some of Provencher's compositions in his style: tango nuevo, which is a fusion of tango and jazz.

In 2003, Norteño released an album entitled Milonga d'automne.

Norteño performed at the Montreal International Jazz Festival in 1996, as well as some concerts at the National Arts Centre in Ottawa. The group performed at the Ottawa Jazz Festival in 2007.
