= Battle of Santiago (band) =

Canadian Afro-Cuban post-rock band

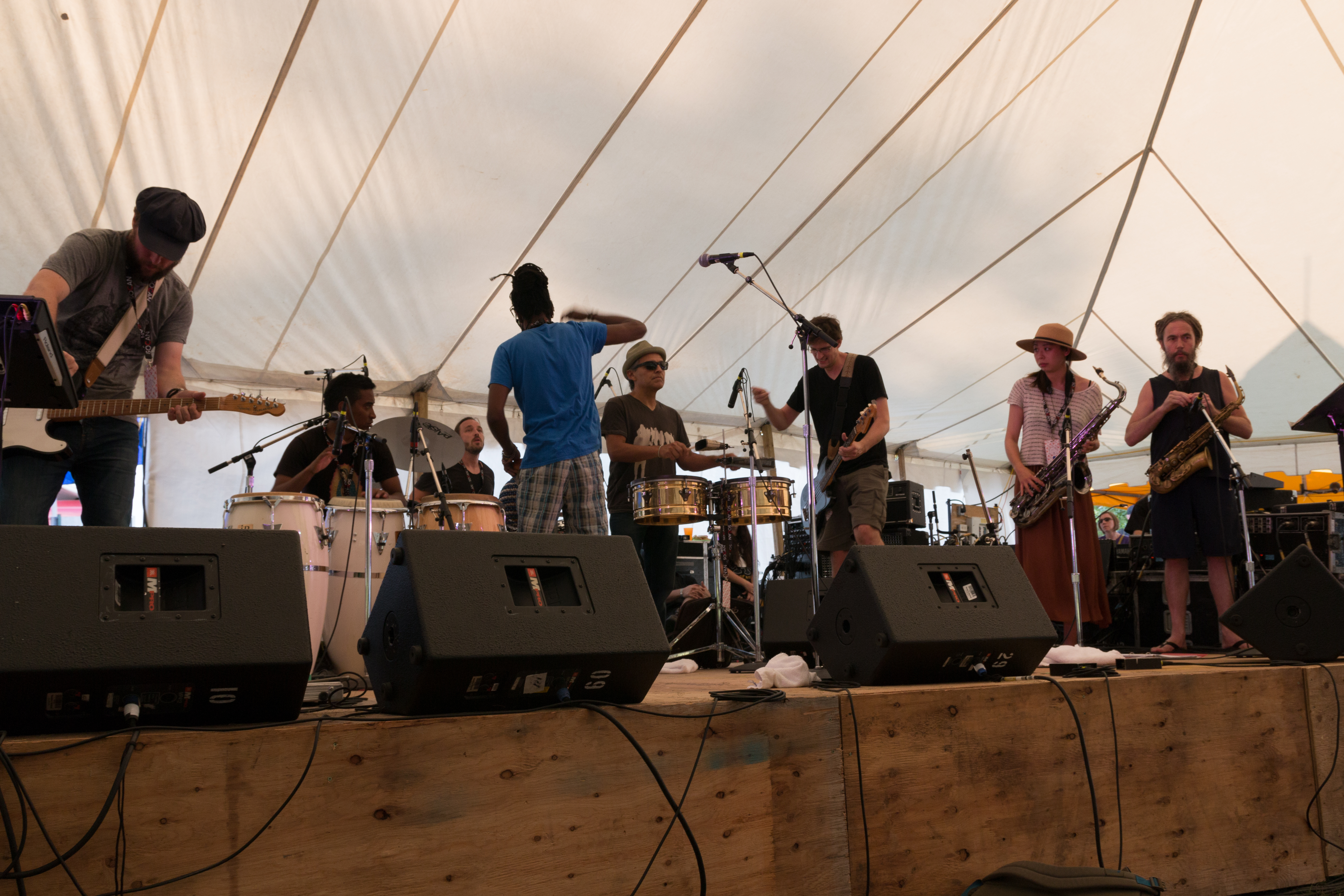
- Battle of Santiago performing at the 2015 Hillside Festival

Background information
- Origin: Toronto, Ontario, Canada
- Genres: Afro Cuban, Post-rock, experimental rock, world, Latin
- Years active: 2011–present
- Label: Made With Pencil Crayons (MWPC)
- Members: Reimundo Sosa; Lyle Crilly; Michael Owen; Michael Butler
- Website: www.battleofsantiago.com

Battle of Santiago is a Canadian Afro-Cuban post-rock band from Toronto, Ontario, Canada formed in 2011.

== History ==
The group is led by Michael Owen (bass player and producer) and has a rotating cast of musicians, with mainstays Reimundo Sosa (percussion and vocals), Lyle Crilly (guitar and synth), Michael Butler (saxophone and flute), and Anthony Daniel (drums), as well as many other supporting musicians.

In 2012, the band's debut album Full Colour was released under their label. Made With Pencil Crayons. The album became the #1 hit on the weekly Canadian college radio charts for International music and stayed in the national Top 20 charts for 4 months. Also, the release reached #1 in a few local markets in Canada, including Guelph and Calgary, also reaching #3 on the Jazz charts on CFRU in Guelph, Ontario. Additionally, this release was selected for CJSR Edmonton's best of 2012 list and reached #13 on Earshot's Top 20 for 2012 on the International music charts.

In 2013, Battle of Santiago released their second album Followed by Thousands. The album became the #1 hit on the weekly Canadian college radio charts for International music on CJSR in Edmonton, holding #5 for two months on the top 20 Earshot charts for International music in late 2012. This release has also hit the charts in the United States reaching #18 on KALX with tracks featured on Latino USA.

Also in 2013, the band was nominated for a SiriusXM Indie Award for World Music Artist of the year. The Knoxville News Sentinel concluded "even if Followed by Thousands fails to sustain keen interest, its mild appeal is consistent", and the group has received coverage from a variety of media outlets.

Battle of Santiago has opened for artists like Cadence Weapon, Saul Williams, and Femi Kuti. The band has performed at the Hillside Festival, Canadian Music Week, NXNE, OCFF, Mundial Montreal, Le Festival Musique Multi-Montréal, the Harrison Festival for the Arts, the Small World Music Festival and the Northern Lights Festival Boréal. At the latter festival, they debuted their fourth album, Queen & Judgement, which was released at the outset of the COVID-19 pandemic.

== Band members ==
- Lyle Crilly – guitar, synth, mixing engineer
- Reimundo Sosa – percussion, vocals
- Michael Owen – bass guitar, guitar, synth, producer, mixing engineer
- Michael Butler – saxophones, flute

Additional live and studio members

- Netto Brooks – vocals
- Melvis Santa – vocals
- Irene Torres – vocals
- Andrew Aldridge – guitar
- Paul Metcalfe – saxophone
- Isax – alto saxophone, flute
- Jason Hay – baritone saxophone, soprano saxophone, flute
- Joel Perez – percussion
- Daniel Mansilla – percussion
- Sty Larocque – drums
- Anthony Daniel – drums
- Magdelys Savigne – percussion, vocals
- Elizabeth Rodriguez – violin, vocals

== Discography ==
- Full Colour (2012)
- Followed By Thousands (2013)
- La Migra (2017)
- Queen & Judgement (2020)

== Awards ==
Year	Award	Work	Nomination	Result
2018	Juno Awards	La Migra	World Music Album of the Year	Nominated

== Awards ==
Year	Award	Work	Nomination	Result
2013	SiriusXM Indie Awards	Followed by Thousands	World Artist or Group of the Year	Nominated
