= List of number-one singles of 1995 (Spain) =

This is a list of the Spanish PROMUSICAE Top 20 Singles number-ones of 1995.

Issue date	Song	Artist
2 January	"Zombie"	Ororo
9 January	"Zombie"	Ororo
16 January	"Zombie"	Ororo
23 January	"Dancing with Tears in My Eyes"	Cabballero
30 January	"Zombie"	Ororo
6 February	"Zombie"	Ororo
13 February	"No More "I Love You's""	Annie Lennox
20 February	"Zombie"	Ororo
27 February	"Zombie"	Ororo
6 March	"Zombie"	Ororo
13 March	"Zombie"	Ororo
20 March	"Quiero volar"	G.E.M.
27 March	"Quiero volar"	G.E.M.
3 April	"Back For Good"	Take That
10 April	"You Belong to Me"	JX
17 April	"Scatman"	Scatman John
24 April	"Scatman"	Scatman John
1 May	"Scatman"	Scatman John
8 May	"Scatman"	Scatman John
15 May	"Scatman"	Scatman John
22 May	"Scatman"	Scatman John
29 May	"Scream"/"Childhood"	Michael Jackson and Janet Jackson
5 June	"Scream"/"Childhood"	Michael Jackson and Janet Jackson
12 June	"Scream"/"Childhood"	Michael Jackson and Janet Jackson
19 June	"Scream"/"Childhood"	Michael Jackson and Janet Jackson
26 June	"Scatman's World"	Scatman John
3 July	"Scatman's World"	Scatman John
10 July	"Scatman's World"	Scatman John
17 July	"Scatman's World"	Scatman John
24 July	"Get It Up"	Sensity World
31 July	"Never Forget"	Take That
7 August	"Never Forget"	Take That
14 August	"El Tiburon"	Proyecto Uno
21 August	"El Tiburon"	Proyecto Uno
28 August	"Play This Song"	2 Fabiola
4 September	"Play This Song"	2 Fabiola
11 September	"Play This Song"	2 Fabiola
18 September	"Extres"	EX-3
25 September	"Extres"	EX-3
2 October	"Shut Up (and Sleep with Me)"	Sin With Sebastian
9 October	"Shut Up (and Sleep with Me)"	Sin With Sebastian
16 October	"Shut Up (and Sleep with Me)"	Sin With Sebastian
23 October	"Shut Up (and Sleep with Me)"	Sin With Sebastian
30 October	"Shut Up (and Sleep with Me)"	Sin With Sebastian
6 November	"Exhale (Shoop Shoop)"	Whitney Houston
13 November	"Exhale (Shoop Shoop)"	Whitney Houston
20 November	"Chasis"	Ricardo F.
27 November	"I Don't Wanna Be a Star"	Corona
4 December	"Nirvana"	Viva
11 December	"Nirvana"	Viva
18 December	"I Don't Wanna Be a Star"	Corona
25 December	"Me and You"	Alexia

== Records for the Year ==
- Longest running number one of the year - Ororo "Zombie" (9 non-consecutive weeks)
- Artists with most number ones - Take That and Scatman John (2)

== See also ==
- 1995 in music
- List of number-one hits (Spain)
