= El Chocolate =

- Born: Antonio Núñez Montoya
- Origin: Seville
- Genres: Flamenco
- Occupation: Singer

El Chocolate (Antonio Núñez Montoya, 4 May 1931 – 19 June 2005) was a Flamenco singer from Seville. He was one of the stars of Carlos Saura's film Flamenco.

== Background ==
Montoya was born in Jerez de la Frontera and was related to the Montoya clan. He grew up in Seville.

== Career ==
He appeared in the film Los Torantos and recorded music with Niño Ricardo and Melchor de Marchena.

== Recognition ==
He was awarded the second Giraldillo del Cante award in 2002.

== Death ==
He was supposed to perform in July 2005 at the 40th Caracol Festival de Flamenco in Lebrija, but cancelled because of his ailing health. He died in Seville on 19 July of cancer in his home in Seville.

== Partial discography ==
- Antonio Núñez 'El Chocolate' (Belter, 1968)
- Mano a Mano El Chocolate/ Fosforito (Belter 1970)
- Antonio Núñez 'El Chocolate' (Trama, 1977)
- Los Cantes de El Chocolate (SAEF, 1980)
- 50 Años de Flamenco, 1935–1985 (Olympo, 1985)
- Los Cantes de El Chocolate (Perfil, 1986)
- El Chocolate, Maestros del Cante (Hispavox, 1987)
- El Chocolate, Maestros del Flamenco (Hispavox, 1988)
- Antonio Núñez 'El Chocolate', Flamenco de Hoy (Coliseum, 1990)
- Si Yo Volviera a Nacer (Senador, 1996)
- Mis 70 años con el Cante (Palo Nuevo/Muxxic, 2001)
