= La Carcacha =

1992 single by Selena

Single by Selena

from the album Entre a Mi Mundo
- A-side: "Baila Esta Cumbia"
- Released: April 1992
- Studio: AMEN Studios (San Antonio, TX)
- Genre: Tejano cumbia
- Length: 4:12
- Label: EMI Latin
- Songwriters: A.B. Quintanilla; Pete Astudillo
- Producer: A.B. Quintanilla

Selena singles chronology
"Buenos Amigos" (1991)	"La Carcacha" (1992)	"Como la Flor" (1992)

Music Video
- "La Carcacha" on YouTube

"La Carcacha" (English: "The Jalopy") is a song recorded by American singer Selena for her third studio album, Entre a Mi Mundo (1992). The song was written by A.B. Quintanilla and Pete Astudillo. It was inspired by a dilapidated car and an experience in which A.B. observed a woman's willingness to court the owner of a luxury car. The song, characterized by its rhythmic melodies and satirical portrayal of life in the barrio, highlights the importance of love and genuine connection over material wealth. It is a Tejano cumbia song that is emblematic of Selena's typical style, while music critics found it to be musically similar to "Baila Esta Cumbia".

The song experienced considerable airplay and chart success, reaching the top spot on Radio & Records Tejano Singles chart. The Recording Industry Association of America (RIAA) has certified it triple platinum, denoting 180,000 units consisting of sales and on-demand streaming in the US. "La Carcacha" played a pivotal role in propelling Selena to prominence within the Tejano music industry, as well as facilitating her breakthrough in Mexico, and emerged as one of her signature songs. The song inspired a lowrider car show and was included in the Broadway musical, Selena Forever (2000). In 2005, Ana Bárbara performed the song at the Selena ¡Vive! benefit concert.

== Background and inspiration ==
In 1991, A.B. Quintanilla, Selena's brother, and the band's keyboardist Joe Ojeda walked from their hotel in Uvalde, Texas, to get food. While eating, A.B. observed a dilapidated vehicle and proclaimed his desire to compose a song inspired by it. He asked Ojeda for the Spanish translation of "broken-down car," which Ojeda provided as "carcacha". A.B. was initially uncertain about the thematic direction he would pursue with the composition.

A month later after his observation of the run-down car, A.B. bought a BMW and went to pick up food. At the restaurant, a worker kept asking about his car, much to his frustration, as he simply sought to retrieve his meal. Overhearing a nearby woman expressing her willingness to court the owner of the car, A.B. utilized this experience to forge "La Carcacha" in collaboration with backup dancer and vocalist Pete Astudillo. Astudillo learned about A.B.'s idea in Eagle Pass, Texas, after a friend of Selena poked fun at a couple arriving at a dance in their beat-up car. Astudillo aspired to craft lyrics centered around a woman devoid of materialistic inclinations, whose acquaintances may deride her and engage in mockery. However, she lacks concern over her partner's possession of a battered car, showing that the paramount sentiment is the significance of love.

== Music and lyrics ==
"La Carcacha"
The composition was characterized by Selena's distinctive style: rhythmic melodies that elicited dance while simultaneously providing a satirical portrayal of life in the barrio.

Musically, "La Carcacha" is primarily a Tejano cumbia song, incorporating elements of piano and synthesizers "woven into it", under a "tasty beat". It features the characteristic danceable tempo typically associated with cumbia recordings. "La Carcacha" contains a fusion of traditional cumbia, Tejano, and alternative rock melodies. The track is emblematic of Selena's cumbia style, with her exuberance discernible in her vocal delivery, as observed by Marysabel E. Huston-Crespo for CNN en Español. The track harbors a musical resemblance to "Baila Esta Cumbia" (1990). Gus Garcia, writing for the Del Rio News-Herald, referred to it as a "hypnotic cumbia". Ramiro Burr, in Billboard, noted that the song encompassed "danceable cumbias and polkas" sharing similarities with "Baila Esta Cumbia". Burr, in the San Antonio Express-News, praised the song's "memorable melodic hook", which he believed engaged listeners in whistling along. He also felt that Selena drew inspiration from the sax-cumbia singer Fito Olivares, culminating in the creation of "La Carcacha". The composition was characterized by Selena's distinctive style: rhythmic melodies that elicited dance while simultaneously providing a satirical portrayal of life in the barrio. Burr believed that A. B. demonstrated a marked progression in his songwriting abilities, cultivating a predilection for power-pop and synthesizer-infused cumbias. "La Carcacha" opens with an introduction by Luis "Bird" Rodriguez, a disc jockey for Laredo's Z-93 radio station, presenting the piece as Selena's latest single. Rodriguez first met the band on the side of the road after their tour bus broke down and offered assistance. Subsequent to this event, Rodriguez was often invited to tour with the group. On a specific occasion, Rodriguez boarded the tour bus while the ensemble was busy fine-tuning "La Carcacha". Rodriguez assisted the group by introducing "a radio rap" and A.B. was particularly impressed by Rodriguez's contribution, and he expressed a keen desire to include the new element in the song. The song begins with a countdown "uno, dos, tres, cuatro" and features the sound of car horns honking in the background.

"La Carcacha" employs a comical narrative intertwined with an underlying moral message. The lyrics of "La Carcacha" revolve around a poignant commentary on materialism and superficiality. The narrative explores the protagonist's experience with a rundown vehicle, known as a "carcacha" in Spanish. By juxtaposing the protagonist's humble means of transportation with a materialistic young woman's desire for luxurious possessions, the song emphasizes the importance of love and genuine connection over material wealth. In a 1992 interview at the Poteet Strawberry Saloon, Selena articulated her creative approach, stating that the music she and her band produced aimed to encapsulate the emotional experiences that people encounter throughout their lives. The songs they wrote, such as "La Carcacha", sought to connect with listeners by reflecting on common experiences. Selena explained that the song's focus on "a clunker car" resonated with many individuals who found themselves in similar situations. According to Jessica Roiz of Billboard, the lyrics of Selena's songs served as a vehicle for conveying valuable life lessons to listeners. In particular, Roiz noted that "La Carcacha" encourages individuals not to be ashamed of their possessions or lack thereof, championing the joys of embracing simplicity and deriving pleasure from the small things in life. Billboard summarized the lyrics as Selena being ridiculed because of her relationship with a partner who owns a broken-down car and defending her partner despite his vehicle's subpar condition. With billowing tailpipe smoke, rudimentary wheels, and a reversed engine, Selena extols her partner's virtues, emphasizing his loyalty and devotion to her.

Tejano music had often suffered from simplistic and generic lyrical content; however, A. B. and Astudillo overcame this stereotype by crafting songs that rendered vibrant depictions of life in the barrio. Chris Riemenschnieder, for the Austin American-Statesman, compared the song's playful nature to Madonna's "True Blue" (1986). Mariam M. Echevarría Báez of El Vocero has drawn a parallel between the comedic essence of "La Carcacha" and that of Selena's "Salta La Ranita" (1986). In her analysis, scholar Deborah Vargas characterized the music in "La Carcacha" as a fusion of high-tech auditory elements. Vargas opined that the sounds in "La Carcacha" create an auditory landscape that has the potential to strongly resonate with those who find themselves situated within economically disadvantaged communities. Selena's biographer Joe Nick Patoski, noted that the singer frequently recorded songs depicting experiences she had not personally encountered, such as "La Carcacha", which delves into themes of "barrio teen romance". Patoski described the composition as an exemplary piece of contemporary music, characterized by its dynamic cumbia rhythm accentuated by call-and-response chants, exuberant shouts, whistles, and Chris Pérez's guitar fills. The song showcases Selena's "mesmerizing snake-charmer vocals"; oscillating between exhilarating and impassioned growls, as she awaits her lover's arrival in his ramshackle vehicle. The narrative encapsulates a story of love amidst adversity, a theme with which A. B. "knew well". John Flores, writing for The Monitor, observed that the song's straightforward themes revolve around a woman's affection for a man, irrespective of his car's condition. "La Carcacha" ultimately portrays the image of a decrepit automobile falling apart, as interpreted by Suzanne Gamboa in the Austin-American Statesman.

== Reception ==
The song experienced "considerable airplay" in several cities throughout Texas. It debuted on local Tejano radio station charts during the week concluding on April 23, 1992. "La Carcacha" ascended to the top spot on Radio & Records Tejano Singles chart on the week ending May 30, 1992. It reached number 14 on Mexico's Grupera Songs chart on the week ending January 26, 1993. In the week ending April 9, 2015, which marked the 16th anniversary of Selena's death, the song reached its peak at number six on the Regional Mexican Digital Song Sales chart. The song peaked at number 16 on the US Latin Pop Digital Song Sales chart on the tracking week of December 16, 2020. It peaked at number 21 on the Latin Digital Song Sales chart on the tracking week of December 16, 2020. In 2017, the Recording Industry Association of America (RIAA) certificated "La Carcacha" triple platinum (Latin), denoting 180,000 units consisting of sales and on-demand streaming in the US.

During her 1993 Houston Astrodome concert, Selena's performance of "La Carcacha" led the audience to "[rise] to their feet", a phenomenon also observed at her San Antonio Alamodome that same year. Similarly, she won over people in Miami, Puerto Rico, and the Caribbean with songs like "La Carcacha", which compelled them to dance, as noted by Ed Crowell in the Austin-American Statesman. The song served as the closing number for Selena's 1993 San Felipe Amphitheater concert, leaving attendees "wanting more". Selena performed "La Carcacha" with an arm-swaying and hip-shaking routine, which had listeners of all ages engaged throughout and emulating the dance moves, according to Roiz.

In May 1993, Selena released her Live! album, which was recorded during a free admissions concert in Corpus Christi, Texas that February. According to Tejano music columnist Rene Cabrera, "La Carcacha" and "La Llamada" (1993) overshadowed Selena's duet with Emilio Navaira on "Tu Robaste Mi Corazon" on the album. The live version allowed the Los Dinos band to excel, providing a show that "[rocked] the house with dynamics and production values equal to any contemporary act's in this part of the planet", according to Patoski. He observed that the live rendition did not necessitate language skills or familiarity with Latin culture for listeners to enjoy. Patoski also commended the keyboard lines, which were enhanced by Ricky Vela and David Lee Garza, and praised Garza's contribution of "street creditability and a touch of blues to his squeezebox instrumental break". Leila Cobo found "La Caracacha" as an example of what Selena did best.

"La Carcacha" was nominated for Single of the Year at the 1993 Tejano Music Awards, though it was dropped during preliminaries. Selena's first music video, shot in Monterrey, Mexico, was for "La Carcacha". This was a rarity for Tejano musicians, as it was unusual for Tejano artists to employ music videos as promotional tools. "La Carcacha" went on to win Video of the Year at the Tejano Music Awards, and was recognized as one of the award-winning songs at the first BMI Latin Awards in 1994. Selena's initial commercially successful singles in Mexico were "Baila Esta Cumbia" and "La Carcacha".

== Legacy and impact ==
"La Carcacha", along with "Como la Flor" (1992) and "Bidi Bidi Bom Bom" (1994), played a pivotal role in propelling Selena to prominence within the Tejano music industry. The song helped increase Selena's fanbase in Mexico, where the singer captivated Mexican audiences during the 1990s with songs such as "Como la Flor" and "La Caracha", by integrating her Mexican-American roots with her American heritage. The latter played a pivotal role in facilitating Selena's breakthrough in Mexico, and emerged as one of her signature songs, that significantly boosted Tejano music sales. Selena's entrance into Mexico with "La Carcacha", "Como la Flor", and "Baila Esta Cumbia", garnered her recognition in the country, and compelled men to traverse extraordinary lengths to see her in concert. On February 26, 1995, Selena delivered a performance of "La Carcacha" at the Houston Astrodome, which became her final concert before she was shot and killed a month later. This concert was posthumously released in February 2001 under the title Live! The Last Concert. Michael Clark, of the Houston Chronicle, posited that tracks like "La Carcacha" and "Bidi Bidi Bom Bom" exemplified Selena's lifelong efforts to elevate Tejano music into the American pop domain. Following the announcement of her death, "La Carcacha" and "Como la Flor" became the most-requested songs on Mexican radio stations. As the first anniversary of Selena's death approached on March 31, 1996, the former was the inaugural song played at the Apodaca casino. On the second anniversary of her death, the song continued to rank among the most requested by Mexican radio listeners. "Cumbia Medley", on the Selena movie soundtrack (1997) that includes "La Carcacha", was identified as a great offering for fans by Fernando Zamora in El Norte. According to scholar Deborah Vargas, "La Carcacha", alongside "Techno Cumbia" (1994) and "Bidi Bidi Bom Bom", serve as prime exemplars of an interwoven race and economic codes that permeate various genres. The lyrical and genre content of these songs inspired the Kumbia Kings, led by A. B., who aimed to emulate the transition from Selena's cumbias to a more urbanized soundscape.

The song served as the inspiration for a lowrider car show. A 1948 Chevrolet Fleetwood, adorned with a mural of Selena crafted by German artist Von Otto on its hood, was named after the song. This vehicle garnered accolades for "Best Bomb", "Best Mural", and "Best Engine" at the 1995 Dallas Low Rider Show and achieved runner-up status at the Los Angeles Car Show. It was awarded Bomb of the Year at the 1997 Lowrider magazine show, and subsequently hailed as "the world's most famous lowrider". The car was eventually incorporated into a Mexican museum collection. "La Carcacha" was included in the set list of the broadway musical Selena Forever (2000), featuring Veronica Vasquez as Selena. Vasquez admitted to struggling with enunciation while rehearsing the song. In their list of the 100 Greatest Car Songs of All-Time, Billboard ranked "La Carcacha" at number 66, writing that the song is emblematic of Selena's career that exemplified the singer and her band's innovative approach to Tejano music in the 1990s, which helped revolutionize the genre, deeming it the quintessential Latin pop car song.

In 2005, Ana Bárbara performed "La Carcacha" at the Selena ¡VIVE! benefit concert. Rogelio Olivas, writing for the Tucson Citizen, observed that Bárbara's rendition revealed a vulnerability in her vocal capabilities and commented on her revealing attire. Bárbara's version peaked at number eight on the Nicaragua Digital Song Sales chart in 2009. In July 2018, American singer-songwriter Cuco performed "La Carcacha" during the Solidarity for Sanctuary concert held at Lincoln Center in New York, citing his reasoning for covering the song was due to its upbeat and danceable nature. In December 2022, Mexican reggaeton artist Bellakath faced allegations of plagiarism for her song "Gatita" (2012), after it went viral on TikTok, as users identified similarities to "La Carcacha". Following accusations that Bellakath had misappropriated the track from another individual, "Gatita" was removed from several streaming platforms.

In Netflix's two-part limited drama, Selena: The Series (which aired from 2020 to 2021), Gabriel Chavarria portrayed A. B. opposite Ricardo Chavira who played Abraham. In the last episode of the first part titled "Qué Creías", Abraham and A.B. engage in a dialogue concerning the song selection for Selena's (Christian Serratos) next album. Abraham queries A.B. about any cumbia tunes that could appeal to their current fanbase, to which A.B. responds with "La Carcacha". Abraham, however, disparages it as a novelty song about a dilapidated car and expresses doubt that such a song could attain hit status. A.B. concurs and expresses his commitment to crafting a better composition. Abraham escalates the pressure on A.B. by emphasizing the record company's requirement for a platinum record as a precondition for Selena's crossover album. He underscores the need for a chart-topping track in order to achieve this objective.

== Credits and personnel ==
Credits are adapted from the liner notes of Entre a Mi Mundo.

- Selena – lead vocals
- A.B. Quintanilla – producer, songwriter, mixing, programming, background vocals
- Pete Astudillo – songwriter
- Ricky Vela – keyboard
- Joe Ojeda – keyboard
- Chris Pérez – guitar
- Brian "Red" Moore – music engineer

== Charts ==
1992 weekly chart positions for "La Carcacha"
Chart (1992–93)	Peak position
US Tejano Singles (Radio & Records)	1
Mexico Grupera Songs (El Siglo de Torreón)	14

2009 weekly chart positions for Ana Bárbara's cover of "La Carcacha"
Chart (2009)	Peak position
Nicaragua Digital Song Sales (EFE)	8

2011–2020 weekly chart positions for "La Carcacha"
Chart (2015–2020)	Peak position
US Latin Digital Song Sales (Billboard)	24
US Latin Pop Digital Song Sales (Billboard)	16
US Regional Mexican Digital Song Sales (Billboard)	6

== Certifications ==
Certification for "La Carcacha"
Region	Certification	Certified units/sales
Spain (Promusicae)	5× Platinum	0^{‡}
United States (RIAA)	3× Platinum (Latin)	180,000^{‡}
^{‡} Sales+streaming figures based on certification alone.

== Works cited ==
- "RIAA Gold & Platinum". RIAA.com. Archived from the original on August 21, 2016.
- "1993 Tejano Music Award Nominations". El Paso Times. December 11, 1992 – via Newspapers.com.
- "Tejano Singles > April 23, 1992". Austin American-Statesman. April 23, 1992 – via Newspapers.com.
- "Mexico Groupera Songs > January 26, 1993". El Siglo de Torreón (in Spanish). January 26, 1993 – via Elsiglodeterron.mx.
- "Selena y Los Dinos; Triunfan en La Onda Grupera". El Siglo de Torreón (in Spanish). August 4, 1993 – via Elsiglodetorreon.com.mx.
- "Los Premios Latinos de BMI" (PDF). Billboard. Vol. 106, no. 12. Nielsen Media. March 19, 1994. Archived (PDF) from the original on October 28, 2021.
- "'La Carcacha' A Showstopper". The Odessa American. November 12, 1995 – via Newspapers.com.
- "Reaccionan Con Tristeza Los Haitantes de Los Dos Lareados Ante la Muerte de Selena". El Siglo de Terron. April 3, 1995 – via Elsiglodetorreon.com.mx.
- "Reaccionan Con Tristeza Los Habitantes de los dos Laredos Ante la Muerte de Selena". El Siglo de Terron (in Spanish). April 2, 1995 – via Elsiglodetorreon.com.mx.
- "1990 to 1995: Highlights of Selena's Recording Career". The Star Tribune. March 31, 1996 – via Newspapers.com.
- "Selena-dedicated 'Carcacha' to be Part of Fiesta". The Odessa American. April 30, 2000 – via Newspapers.com.
- "Una Reina del Tex-Mex". Fort Worth Star-Telegram. September 15, 2005 – via Newspapers.com.
- "Éxitos discográficos de la semana > June 26, 2009". EFE. June 26, 2009. ProQuest 433547168.
- "Regional Mexican Digital Song Sales > April 9, 2011". Billboard. Vol. 123, no. 12. April 9, 2011. Gale A253627432 – via Gale Research.
- "Watch Cuco Pay Tribute to Selena With His Cover of "La Carcacha"". Billboard.com. August 22, 2018.
- "Latin Pop Digital Song Sales > July 15, 2020". Billboard. Archived from the original on July 15, 2020.
- "Esta es la canción de 2012 por la que acusan a Bellakath de plagio". El Sol de Mexico. December 21, 2022. ProQuest 2757013310.
- Anon. (March 31, 2025). "Certificados del artista: Selena". elportaldemusica.es (in Spanish). Archived from the original on August 18, 2026.
- Burr, Ramiro (March 14, 1992a). "The Young Turks of Tejano" (PDF). Billboard. Vol. 104, no. 8.
- Burr, Ramiro (December 11, 1992b). "1993 Tejano Music Award Nominees". El Paso Times – via Newspapers.com.
- Burr, Ramiro (April 1, 1995). "Selena – April 16, 1971 – March 31, 1995". San Antonio Express-News – via Newsbank.
- Burr, Ramiro (March 30, 2001). "Buzz: 'Selena' reopens as benefit show". San Antonio Express-News – via NewspaperArchive.com.
- Burr, Ramiro; Shannon, Doug (2003). Encyclopedia Latina. Scholastic Library Publishing. ISBN 0717258157.
- Burr, Ramiro (2004). Selena (2nd ed.). Schirmer Reference. Gale CX3428400473 – via Gale Research.
- Bustios, Pamela (December 16, 2020). "Selena Returns to Latin Pop Albums Chart With 'Selena: The Series Soundtrack'". Billboard.
- Cabrera, Rene (July 24, 1992). "Selena, Mazz plan concerts here". Corpus Christi Caller-Times – via Newspapers.com.
- Cabrera, Rene (February 26, 1993a). "Mazz, Navaira Top Tejano Award Nominees". Corpus Christi Caller-Times – via Newspapers.com.
- Cabrera, Rene (March 5, 1993b). "Selena, David Lee Draw Crowd in Houston". Corpus Christi Caller-Times – via Newspapers.com.
- Cabrera, Rene (June 11, 1993c). "More than 33,000 Attended Alamadone Concert". Corpus Christi Caller-Times – via Newspapers.com.
- Cabrera, Rene (March 31, 1996a). "Rising Tide of Tejano". Corpus Christi Caller-Times – via Newspapers.com.
- Cabrera, Rene (October 18, 1996b). "Another Smash Selena CD Due Out". Corpus Christi Caller-Times – via Newspapers.com.
- Cabrera, Rene (May 29, 1998). "Double Bill on Saturday in Alice; Selena Still Atop Chart with Boxed Set". Corpus Christi Caller-Times – via Newspapers.com.
- Campbell, Elizabeth (June 29, 1993). "Selena y Los Dinos Infect Tejano Rodeo with Dance Fever". Fort Worth Star-Telegram – via Newspapers.com.
- Chirinos, Fanny S (March 27, 2005). "Selena Fans Flock to City". Corpus Christi Caller-Times.
- Clark, Michael D. (January 10, 2002). "Best Sounds of 2001". Houston Chronicle. ProQuest 395808572.
- Cobo, Leila (September 14, 2002). "Vital Reissues". Billboard. Vol. 114, no. 37. p. 96.
- Colloff, Pamela (April 2010). "Dreaming of Her". Texas Monthly. 38 (4). Gale A222555398 – via Gale Research.
- Corpus, Lorena (April 1, 1996). "Por Siempre, Selena". El Norte (in Spanish). Gale A13276416 – via Gale Research.
- Crowell, Ed (April 6, 1995). "The Legend of Selena is Still in the Making". Austin-American Statesman – via Newspapers.com.
- Echevarría Báez, Mariam M. (August 26, 2022). "Nueva vida a la música de Selena". El Vocero (in Spanish).
- Flores, John (April 3, 1995). "Mourners Say Singer Was Perfect Role Model". The Monitor – via Newspapers.com.
- Flores, Veronica (April 15, 1994). "Nothing Lost in Translation Selena Brings Grammy Winning Latin Sound to Town". The Chicago Sun-Times. ProQuest 257998188.
- Garcia, Gus (July 20, 1993a). "Selena Del Rio-Bound". Del Rio News-Herald – via NewspaperArchive.com.
- Garcia, Gus (July 26, 1993b). "Selena, Sunny Wow Crowd". Del Rio Herald-News – via Newspapers.com.
- Gray, Anthony (April 2, 1995). "Mexico Mourns Loss of La Reyna Tejana". The Brownsville Herald – via NewspaperArchive.com.
- Gamboa, Suzanne (April 3, 1995). "Selena's Death Leaves Void in Hispanic Culture". Austin-American Statesman – via Newspapers.com.
- Hernandez, Mary (April 1, 1997). "Su Voz 'inunda' Las Transmisiones". El Norte (in Spanish). Gale A128280959 – via Gale Research.
- Huston-Crespo, Marysabel E. (March 31, 2022). "¿Cuál es la magia de Selena Quintanilla? El legado de la cantante tejana sigue intacto a más de un cuarto de siglo de su muerte". CNN en Español (in Spanish). Gale A698927110 – via Gale Research.
- Lawrence, Guy H (July 13, 1998). "Customizing Lowrider Cars Becoming a Family Affair". Corpus Christi Caller-Times – via Newspapers.com.
- Maldonado, Vilma (October 31, 1991). "Selena y Los Dinos Receives Gold Album". The Monitor – via Newspapers.com.
- Maldonado, Vilma (March 31, 2000). "Musical Tribute to a Tejano Icon". The Monitor – via Newspapers.com.
- Olivas, Rogelio (April 14, 2005). "Decade After Selena's Death, Pals Shine in Touching Concert". Tuscan Citizen – via Newspapers.com.
- Ovalle, Juan Martin (April 9, 2005). "Y El Espiritu de Selena Reino". Fort Worth Star-Telegram – via Newspapers.com.
- Patoski, Joe Nick (January 1993). "The Sound of Musica". Texas Monthly. 21 (1). Gale A13276416 – via Gale Research.
- Patoski, Joe Nick (1996). Selena: Como La Flor. Boston: Little Brown and Company. ISBN 0-316-69378-2.
- Patoski, Joe Nick (March 24, 1996b). "Remembering Selena". Austin-American Statesman – via Newspapers.com.
- Quintanilla, Selena (2002). Entre a Mi Mundo (Media notes). A.B. Quintanilla (producer), Suzette Quintanilla (spoken liner notes producer). EMI Latin.
- Riemenschneider, Chris (March 29, 1999). "Selena Redux is for Curious, Casual Fans". Austin-American Statesman – via Newspapers.com.
- Robles, Henry (December 4, 2020). "Qué Creías". Selena: The Series. Season 1. Episode 9. 30 minutes in. Netflix.
- Rodriguez, Estella (April 16, 1995). "Friends Remember Selena". Laredo Morning Times. "Mr. Quintanilla always wanted to hire Bird to be Selena's bodyguard, he says, and the group was always inviting him to tour with them. It was during one of those tours that Bird got involved in the recordings. "We were in the bus, and these guys were fixing this song called 'La Carcacha' – in the bus! I just started doing a radio rap and bam, A.B. says, 'you're going to do it. I want that in the song.' " Bird recalls."
- Rosas, Hector; Hernandez, Mary (March 31, 2005). "Llega como plebeya y se va como reina". El Norte (in Spanish). Gale A131077116 – via Gale Research.
- Roiz, Jessica (March 25, 2020). "Selena's Best Life Lessons in Her Lyrics: Staying Humble, Self-Worth & Living Life". Billboard.
- Roiz, Jessica (June 24, 2021). "The 100 Greatest Car Songs of All Time: Staff List". Billboard.
- Roiz, Jessica (June 10, 2019). "Selena Schools Us on a Very Important Life Lesson in This Rare 1992 Video: Watch". Billboard.
- San-Juan, Rocio (December 1992). "Selena y Los Dinos: La Revelacion del '92". Norteña Musical (23). "Entro fuerte y con el pie derecho cantando su "Carcacha", cancion que le dio el exito definintivo entre el publico Mexicano."
- Suarez, Carmen (March 21, 1993). "Award Show Honors Tejano Musicians". Abilene Reporter-News – via Newspapers.com.
- Vargas, Deborah R. (2012). Dissonant divas in chicana music : the limits of la onda. University of Minnesota Press. ISBN 978-0816673162.
- Villareal, Yvonne (December 6, 2020). "Christian Serratos Knows She's Not Selena". Stateside Record and Landmark – via Newspapers.com.
- Zamora, Fernando (May 3, 1997). "Solo Para Fans". El Norte (in Spanish). Gale A129991490 – via Gale Research.
