= Entre a Mi Mundo =

Studio album by Selena
- Released: May 6, 1992
- Recorded: 1991–1992
- Studios: AMEN (San Antonio, Texas)
- Genre: Tejano cumbia
- Length: 34:16
- Languages: Spanish; English
- Label: EMI Latin
- Producers: A. B. Quintanilla; Bebu Silvetti; Jorge A. Pino

Selena chronology
Ven Conmigo (1990)	Entre a Mi Mundo (1992)	Selena Live! (1993)

Singles from Entre a Mi Mundo
- 1. "La Carcacha" Released: April 1992; 2. "Como la Flor" Released: June 1992; 3. "¿Qué Creias?" Released: November 1992; 4. "Ámame" Released: April 1993

Entre a Mi Mundo (English: Enter My World) is the third studio album by American singer Selena, released on May 6, 1992, by EMI Latin. The label endeavored to bolster Selena's popularity within the Latin music market in the United States with this release. Selena's brother, A. B. Quintanilla kept his role as the singer's producer and, in collaboration with Selena y Los Dinos members Pete Astudillo and Ricky Vela, composed tracks for the album. The ensuing recording encompassed an eclectic array of songs, attributable to the members' diverse backgrounds, which facilitated the modernization of the many genres they explored. Entre a Mi Mundo is a Tejano cumbia album that encapsulated Selena's quintessential sound, characterized by engaging tunes harmonized with her distinctive, plaintive vocals and a relaxed, danceable cumbia beat. The album incorporates musical inspirations from power pop, R&B, disco, rock, funk, and synthesized Tejano music.

The assemblage of tracks featured on the album encompassed lyrics inspired by a myriad of personal experiences and tribulations, delving into themes such as unrequited love, teen romance, women empowerment, and heartbreaks. Entre a Mi Mundo was supported by its singles, including the career-propelling "La Carcacha", the career-defining track "Como la Flor", the crowd-pleaser "¿Qué Creías?", and Selena's ode to guitarist Chris Pérez, "Ámame". Two of the most popular singles, "La Carcacha" received critical acclaim for its quintessential representation of Selena's style, while "Como la Flor" burgeoned as Selena's signature song and her "trademark", serving as both her posthumous epithet and swan song. The song's ubiquity has enshrined it among her most esteemed works, solidifying its stature within the Texas musical canon and rendering it one of the most renowned songs recorded by an artist of Mexican descent in the United States. The preponderance of contemporary reviews lauded Entre a Mi Mundo, conferring widespread critical acclaim. Music critics discerned the album as Selena's "breakthrough album".

Selena promulgated Entre a Mi Mundo through an array of performances and public engagements. In July 1992, EMI Latin president José Behar organized a press tour for Selena in Monterrey, Mexico, attracting a multitude of Mexican entertainment journalists. Despite initial concerns about her limited Spanish proficiency and the perception of Tejanos in Mexico, Selena's approachable demeanor won over the press, who labeled her "an artist of the people". EMI Latin capitalized on the growing popularity of "¿Qué Creías?" and Entre a Mi Mundo, leading to several concert bookings in Mexico. Amid a concert in Monterrey, a sudden influx of attendees precipitated an exigent evacuation of the ensemble to sequester in the tour bus. Selena ultimately re-emerged on stage, asking for calm to enable the band to resume their performance. This occurrence was later portrayed in the 1997 biopic about Selena, starring Jennifer Lopez. Analogously, Selena's participation in Veronica Castro's Y Vero América ¡Va!, broadcast throughout Latin America, was subsequently depicted in Netflix's two-part limited drama Selena: The Series (2020–21), starring Christian Serratos. At the 1993 Lo Nuestro Awards, Selena shared the accolade for Best Regional Mexican Album for Entre a Mi Mundo with La Mafia's Estas Tocando Fuego, while the album procured Album of the Year — Orchestra at the 1993 Tejano Music Awards.

Entre a Mi Mundo peaked at number one on the US Billboard Regional Mexican Albums chart, for eight consecutive months. Critics praised the achievement while Entre a Mi Mundo ended 1993 as the best-selling Regional Mexican Album in the US. The album shattered the record for the longest stay at number one by a female Tejano artist, and it became the inaugural album by a Tejano woman to exceed sales milestones of 100,000, 200,000, and 300,000 units. Entre a Mi Mundo became the second all-time best-selling regional Mexican album in the US since Nielsen SoundScan began tracking sales in 1991. On March 31, 1995, Selena was murdered and Entre a Mi Mundo re-entered the Top Latin Albums and Regional Mexican Albums chart at the fourth position, superseded solely by other Selena releases. It eventually peaked at number 91 on the US Billboard 200 chart. By 1997, Entre a Mi Mundo had amassed 385,000 units in Mexico, marking the highest sales figure by a female Tejano artist within the country. In 2017, Entre a Mi Mundo was certified Diamond (Latin) by the Recording Industry Association of America (RIAA) denoting 600,000 album-equivalent units sold in the US. As of 2018, Entre a Mi Mundo has garnered a cumulative sales total of 1,000,000 copies across the US and Mexico.

== Production and development ==
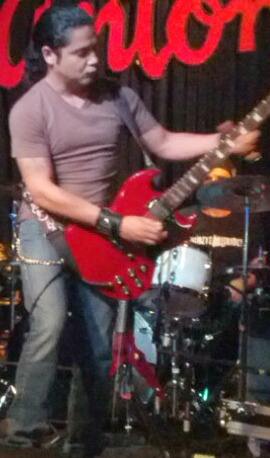
Following initial reservations from Abraham Quintanilla, Chris Pérez joined the group in 1988, briefly left, and returned in 1991. Entre a Mi Mundo became his inaugural collaborative effort with the band.

In 1988, Chris Pérez replaced Roger Garcia as the guitarist of Selena y Los Dinos. Pérez developed an admiration for the ensemble subsequent to experiencing their album Preciosa (1988), becoming particularly enamored with A. B. Quintanilla's musical production. Pérez elected to join Selena y Los Dinos, and abandoned his recently formed rock band. In 1990, Pérez temporarily departed the group, leading to Joe Ortega's recruitment. However, upon his wife's insistence, Ortega relinquished his position after their marriage, resulting in Pérez's return to the ensemble in the summer of 1991.

Initially, Abraham Quintanilla—the group's manager and father of A. B., drummer Suzette Quintanilla, and Selena—dismissed Pérez, perceiving him as more of a rocker and deeming him ill-suited for a Tejano band. Writing for People magazine, Betty Cortina asserted that Pérez contradicted Abraham's "clean cut good kids" image. A. B. convinced Abraham that Pérez was proficient in performing Tejano music, maintaining that Pérez's rocker image was innocuous. In 1989, EMI Latin hesitated to let A. B. maintain his role as the group's producer. However, given the uncertainty of the genre's future, the company acquiesced, allowing A. B. to stay on as producer but cautioning that failure would result in his replacement by a company-approved candidate. After Selena's 1989 self-titled album surpassed the performance of other female Tejano artists' releases, A. B. secured his position. The group's second studio album, Ven Conmigo (1990), achieved a top-five ranking on the United States Billboard Regional Mexican Albums chart. Consequently, EMI Latin, bolstered by this and other albums from Tejano artists, became the second most successful regional label in the nation. The company's mission for Selena's next album was to expand the singer's popularity within the Latin music market in the US.

Pérez was taken back at the group's work ethic throughout the entire production of Entre a Mi Mundo, which was the inaugural album on which he collaborated with the ensemble. During pre-production, keyboardist Ricky Vela would sequence the music—Pérez was taken aback by the emphasis placed on this aspect—while A. B. would collaborate with Vela to resolve any technical issues they encountered and select the compositions for Selena's recording. EMI Latin hired Argentine producer Bebu Silvetti to assist A. B. during the production of Entre a Mi Mundo. The group would convene at A. B.'s residence during pre-production to refine their musical elements, while Selena familiarized herself with the songs chosen by A. B. Pérez marveled at Selena's ability to learn songs autonomously. He observed this consistency during the production of Entre a Mi Mundo, where Selena would enter the studio and "add so much personality and liveliness to the song", which he believed facilitated listeners' connection to the recording. Vela also praised Selena's capacity to promptly comprehend the phrasing, the significance, and the essence of what the song aimed to convey, likening it to a cinematic performance. Pérez revealed that during production, Vela would be present from the onset of each recording day until its conclusion to address any issues that emerged as he was the individual to rectify them. Vela noted that during post-production, the band would frequently desire to modify a particular verse or lyric at the last minute; Selena would then arrive, incorporating her distinct musical flair to those adjustments and elevating the piece beyond its original intent.

== Writing and recording ==
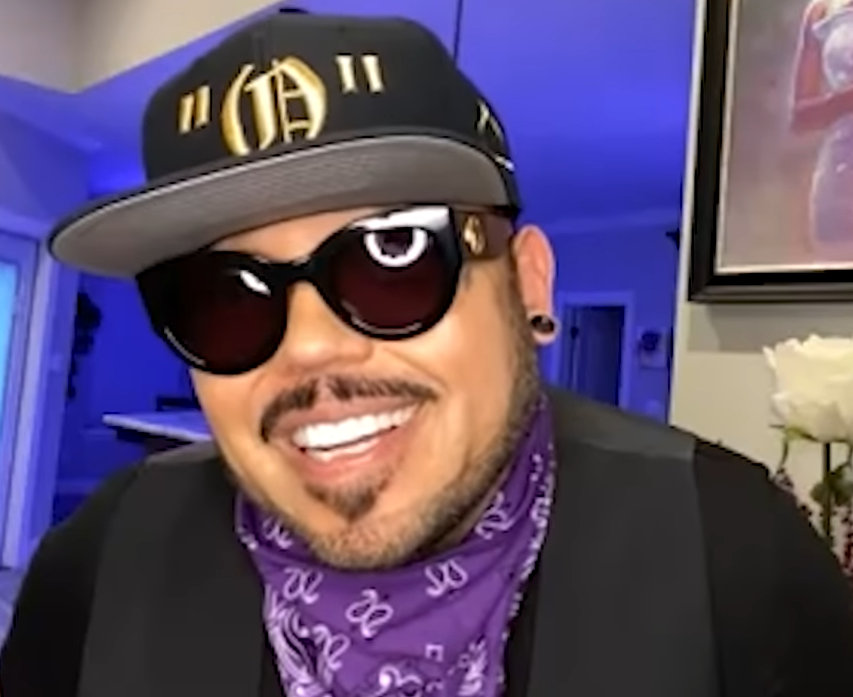
It took a decade for A. B. Quintanilla (pictured) to write "Como la Flor", after conceptualizing the idea in 1982.

The recording of Entre a Mi Mundo transpired at the San Antonio studio owned by Tejano music producer Manny Guerra, with Brian "Red" Moore, Guerra's in-house music engineer, supervising the process as A. B. assumed the roles of producer and arranger, directing the operation. The writing process commenced in early 1991. During the selection of tracks, Vela presented A. B. with multiple songs he had penned, including an incomplete piece titled "Si La Quieres". Though the song consisted merely of fragments, A. B. appreciated its existing chorus. Vela drafted a verse that failed to captivate A. B., compelling him to spend hours crafting verses and melodies until the unrequited love theme for the song garnered approval. In 1982, within the band's first year as a group, A. B. noticed a family selling illuminated plastic flowers at a Sacramento concert and resolved to compose a song about a flower someday. A decade later, while showering at a Bryan, Texas hotel, a catchy melody struck him, prompting him to hastily exit the shower and collaborate with Pete Astudillo on the song. Assembling the music required 20 minutes, while Astudillo spent an additional hour penning the lyrics for "Como la Flor".

Vela admitted to utilizing a thesaurus and dictionary to compete with Astudillo when composing "Yo Te Sigo Queriendo". Astudillo's collaborative efforts persisted with "¿Qué Creias?", a track conceived in the back seat of a car during a challenge from A. B. to create a song before the band's arrival in Las Vegas from their concert in California. Tejano artist David Lee Garza contributed his emotive accordion style to the piece. A. B. penned "La Carcacha" after he and keyboardist Joe Ojeda encountered a dilapidated vehicle at a Uvalde, Texas restaurant. When A. B. inquired about the Spanish term for a broken-down car, Ojeda supplied the word "carcacha". A. B. spent six months developing the song, inspired by an incident where, after collecting food in his newly acquired BMW, he grew irritated by a worker's incessant questions about the car and eavesdropped on a woman expressing her desire to date the car's owner. Astudillo became aware of A. B.'s concept for "La Carcacha" after a friend of Selena mocked a couple for arriving at a dance in their battered vehicle in Eagle Pass, Texas. Astudillo aspired to craft lyrics centered around a woman devoid of materialistic inclinations, whose acquaintances may deride her and engage in mockery, yet she remains unperturbed by her partner's possession of a battered car, showing that the paramount sentiment is the significance of love.

The album's sole English-language track, "Missing My Baby", was composed and recorded to highlight Selena's multifaceted musical abilities and enrich the album's assortment of musical genres. Selena aspired to include an English-language song on the album, believing it would persuade EMI Records of her readiness to release a crossover album. A. B. spent a week crafting "Missing My Baby", which was recorded three weeks later in late 1991 in Sun Valley, Los Angeles. The record company sought to have R&B duo Full Force create a remixed rendition of the track. A. B. and Selena convened with the duo at Full Force's Brooklyn recording studio, whereupon the group consented to contribute backing vocals, which they recorded within two days. Pérez and Selena began dating after confessing their mutual affection, despite her father's disapproval. In response to her feelings for Pérez and their covert liaison, Selena created "Ámame", enlisting Astudillo's help with the lyrics. Abraham described Selena's commitment to recording the song as her investing "every ounce of energy" into it.

== Composition ==
"Como La Flor"
According to Erika Ramirez of Billboard, Selena's performance of "Como la Flor" and "No Me Queda Más" (1994) was so passionate and devoted that it left listeners feeling either nostalgic or transported to a fantasy world.

At the time of its release, Entre a Mi Mundo showcased the band's most inventive auditory landscape. The group's diverse backgrounds contributed to the album's eclectic influences; Vela devised songs with intricate arrangements, Pérez infused rock and roll, Ojeda integrated "traditional street music", Astudillo introduced sophisticated lyrics and melodies with numerous chords, A. B. further refined his production skills, and Selena imbued her music with soul and adaptability. The album featured a multifaceted musical style, a formula that evidently succeeded, according to Patoski. According to Joey Guerra of the Houston Chronicle, the band demonstrated profound reverence for the various genres they modernized on the album. Entre a Mi Mundo encapsulated Selena's quintessential sound, characterized by engaging tunes harmonized with her distinctive, plaintive vocals and a relaxed, danceable cumbia beat, as noted by Leila Cobo. Entre a Mi Mundo is primarily a Tejano cumbia album. The recording encompassed a wide range of musical influences, including power-pop, synth-driven Tejano cumbia, traditional Tejano, R&B, disco, rock, and funk music.

Selena's biographer, Joe Nick Patoski, described "La Carcacha" as an exemplary piece of contemporary music, characterized by its dynamic cumbia rhythm accentuated by call-and-response chants, exuberant shouts, whistles, and Pérez's guitar fills. The song showcases Selena's "mesmerizing snake-charmer vocals"; oscillating between exhilarating and impassioned growls, as she awaits her lover's arrival in his ramshackle vehicle. The narrative encapsulates a story of love amidst adversity, a theme with which A. B. "knew well". Selena frequently recorded songs depicting experiences she had not personally encountered, as with "La Carcacha", which delves into themes of "barrio teen romance". Tejano music often suffered from simplistic and generic lyrical content; however, A. B. and Astudillo overcame this stereotype by crafting songs such as "La Carcacha" that rendered vibrant depictions of life in the barrio. Ramiro Burr asserted that Selena imbued her music with more emotion and soul in "La Carcacha". Burr, acknowledging A. B.'s significantly enhanced songwriting, noted that the band drew inspiration from sax-cumbia singer Fito Olivares when they recorded "La Carcacha", praising the song as a "marvelous [and] "danceable cumbia" track.

A. B. initially requested Pérez to perform "Las Cadenas" in a rock style but later opted for a conjunto (small band) style. Pérez was nevertheless delighted to record the song, as the conjunto nature evoked childhood nostalgia. He also believed that Selena's vocals would complement the song—a conjunto track about an exuberant protagonist regaining control of her life after feeling confined in a relationship. Incorporating the squeezebox, Mario Tarradell of The Dallas Morning News deemed the song well-crafted, catchy, and skillfully executed.

The ranchera track "¿Qué Creias?" portrays a woman indignantly confronting her lover, reminding female listeners of the tendency for men to take them for granted. The "spirited mariachi kiss-off anthem", chronicles an unrepentant woman who declines to reconcile with an unfaithful partner. Patoski perceived "¿Qué Creias?" as an anomaly in Selena's cumbia repertoire, noting its characteristics of traditional mariachi and bordering on "an outright theft." He further emphasized the song's demonstration of her unrestrained vocal range and forceful delivery of lyrics, reminiscent of Lucha Villa's gritty passion, characterizing it as brimming with sass and fire. Selena, in describing the song, avers that it embodies women on a collective scale.

The lyrics in "Como la Flor" describe a woman witnessing her former lover with another and accepting the need to move forward, wishing them well and comparing her past relationship to a withered flower. Selena portrays a hopeless romantic who finds solace in being able to say that she had loved, even if it meant losing the relationship. According to Erika Ramirez of Billboard, Selena's performance of "Como la Flor" and "No Me Queda Más" (1994) was so passionate and devoted that it left listeners feeling either nostalgic or transported to a fantasy world. Pérez describes the lyrics as "aching", while Wallace finds them plaintive, bringing even "the toughest hombres" to tears. Scholar Deborah Parédez characterizes the lyrics as self-abnegating after an unsuccessful relationship, in stark contrast to the themes of typical cumbia, salsa, and dance songs in Latin music; its lyrics more closely resemble those of pop music. During Selena's emotional proclamations of unrequited love, "Como la Flor" exerts a "tensive pull" on the listener. Selena's "teardrop vocals" capture and convey what Roland Barthes referred to as "the grain of Selena's voice".

According to Patoski, "Missing My Baby" exemplifies modern pop, while J. R. Reynolds of Billboard perceives it as an enchanting ballad that blends an R&B-infused tune with Selena's distinctive pop vocal style. Tim Baker of Newsweek found it to be avant-garde for its era. Lyrically, "Missing My Baby" delves into a poignant exploration of longing and reminiscence. The song's narrative centers around a protagonist who mourns the absence of her lover, as she nostalgically recalls the idyllic and rapturous moments once shared between them. Jerry Johnston of the Deseret News commented that Selena exhibited a "Lesley Gore baby-voice" in "Missing My Baby" and displayed remarkable vocal agility. The Virginian-Pilot noted that the song's hooks evoke Diana Ross's "Missing You", a tribute to Marvin Gaye, and the Beach Boys' "Good to My Baby". Tarradell suggested that "Missing My Baby" and other tracks were incorporated into Entre a Mi Mundo as a beneficial addition. Guerra discerned impassioned club rhythms within the music of "Ámame". In "Vuelve a Mí", characterized as a polka, expresses Selena's yearning for a former lover to return. In a recitative preamble accompanied by the auditory backdrop of a thunderstorm, Selena remarks that the precipitation evokes memories of the day her lover departed, drawing a parallel between the raindrops and her own tears.

== Release ==
=== Marketing ===
Entre a Mi Mundo preceded Pérez's encounters with law enforcement, his separate involvement in a vandalized hotel room, and his elopement with Selena on April 2, 1992. Upon witnessing Selena and Pérez's intimate interaction on the tour bus, Abraham stopped the vehicle and engaged in a heated dispute with them. He threatened to dissolve the group if the relationship persisted. Selena and Pérez acquiesced; Abraham dismissed Pérez from the band and barred Selena from departing with him. However, the pair secretly continued their relationship. Within hours, the media divulged their elopement, prompting Selena's family to search for her. Abraham initially reacted poorly to the news and distanced himself. He later approached Pérez, offered an apology, accepted the marriage, and reinstated Pérez in the band. In February 1992, EMI Latin enlisted Al Rendon to capture photographs for Entre a Mi Mundo after a previous photographer's images were met with disapproval. Rendon secured a studio and engaged John MacBurney for makeup, despite Abraham's frequent disagreements with MacBurney. MacBurney privately expressed to EMI Latin that Abraham was challenging to work with, yet both Rendon and MacBurney found Selena amenable. Selena selected her outfit and pose for the cover image, choices that visibly perturbed Abraham. Selena had designed the outfit she wore for the artwork. In 1998, the attire she donned for the album cover was displayed at the Selena museum in Corpus Christi, Texas. Entre a Mi Mundo was released in the United States on May 6, 1992. To commemorate Selena's 20th year in the music industry, the album was reissued and made accessible for physical and digital purchase on September 22, 2002. The limited edition featured Selena's duet with Salvadoran singer Álvaro Torres on their 1991 single "Buenos Amigos", a 1989 cover of Air Supply's Russell Hitchcock's solo single "Where Did the Feeling Go?", music videos for "La Carcacha" and "Buenos Amigos", as well as spoken liner notes containing commentary and recollections of each track provided by the singer's family, friends, and band.

Entre a Mi Mundo's lead single, "La Carcacha" was released in April and ascended to the top spot on Radio & Records Tejano Singles chart on the week ending May 30, 1992. The song played a pivotal role in propelling Selena to prominence within the Tejano music industry, while it increased Selena's fanbase in Mexico. The Recording Industry Association of America (RIAA) has certified "La Carcacha" triple Platinum (Latin), denoting 180,000 units consisting of sales and on-demand streaming in the US. "Como la Flor" was released as the second single in June 1992. It peaked at number six on the US Billboard Hot Latin Songs chart for the week ending October 24, 1992. Suzette Fernandez of Billboard stated that the song was Selena's first commercially successful single in the US and that it had made a statement in her musical career. (Note: Selena's first commercially successful single in the United States is her version of "La Bamba", which peaked at number 19 on Billboard's Hot Latin Songs chart on the week ending August 8, 1987.) The success of "Como la Flor" boosted sales of Entre a Mi Mundo. "Como la Flor" was the most-played song on Tejano radio stations in Texas, according to a survey conducted by the Austin American-Statesman. The song was also one of the most-played tracks on radio stations in Houston, Dallas, and San Francisco. The song finished 1992 as the 31st-best-performing song on the Hot Latin Songs chart while topping indie music charts in Texas.

In July 1992, EMI Latin president José Behar organized a high-profile press tour for Selena in Monterrey, Mexico, attracting a significant number of Mexican entertainment journalists. Despite initial challenges due to Selena's limited Spanish proficiency and the perception of Tejanos in Mexico, the growing popularity of "¿Qué Creías?" and Entre a Mi Mundo helped Selena connect with the Mexican press and audiences. As a result, "Como la Flor" climbed the Mexican Grupera chart, becoming one of the most-played songs on Mexican radio stations in 1992 and early 1993. "Como la Flor" became one of the most popular songs recorded by an artist of Mexican descent in the US. It is widely considered to be Selena's signature song and her "trademark", "Como la Flor" has become a posthumous epithet and swan song, as well as her most popular recording. This was a surprise, according to Red, because the group believed "La Carcacha" would have been the most successful song off of Entre a Mi Mundo. "Como la Flor" and "La Carcacha" marked Selena's career and cemented her in the public conscious.

The RIAA has certified "Como la Flor" 9× Platinum (Latin), denoting 540,000 units consisting of sales and on-demand streaming in the US. "¿Qué Creías?" entered at number 38 on the Billboard Hot Latin Songs chart on the week ending November 28, 1992. It peaked at number 14 on the issue dated February 6, 1993. The song was certified gold (Latin) by the RIAA, signifying 30,000 units consisted of sales and on-demand streaming. "Ámame" debuted at number 40 on the Billboard Hot Latin Songs chart on the week ending April 24, 1993. "Ámame" peaked at number 27 on the Hot Latin Songs chart in the week ending May 22, 1993. The recording was the third-highest charting Tejano single on the Hot Latin Songs chart for the week, following La Mafia's chart-topper "Me Estoy Enamorado" and Mazz "¿Qué Será?" at number 17. Songs on the album became the first recording by a Tejano singer to achieve massive radio airplay. Selena, alongside Bronco, La Mafia, and Liberación, became one of the most-played artists on Mexican radio stations in 1992.

=== Performances ===
By 1992, Selena's appearances in Corpus Christi, Texas, have been sell-outs. Within the initial week of Entre a Mi Mundo's release, Selena performed at Caesars Palace during the 1992 Premio Lo Nuestro on May 14. She also "captivated" attendees at the Los Angeles Fiesta Broadway, the largest Cinco de Mayo celebration in the US, according to biographer Himilce Novas. In June, Selena made her debut appearance on the Orale Primo music program. In October, she headlined a benefit concert in Houston for victims of Hurricane Andrew, drawing a crowd of 21,000, with proceeds directed toward aiding those affected in Florida. In December, Más, a celebrity magazine targeting the Hispanic market, featured a cover story on Selena. Photographer John Dyer recounted Selena's active involvement in the entire photoshoot, highlighting her amicable demeanor. However, he noted that Selena insisted on a specific style for her eyebrows, fearing her father's disapproval if changed, and found that she "wasn't cynical, standoffish, or haughty; not what'd expect from someone of her stature." At the 1993 Houston Astrodome, Selena performed to a crowd of 57,894 attendees, breaking the matinee record set by La Mafia and Texas Tornados in 1992, and received critical acclaim for her performance. Selena performed at the annual Cinco de Mayo celebration in Fort Worth's Marine Park, attracting an estimated 26,000 attendees. Writing in the Fort Worth Star-Telegram, Elizabeth Campbell lauded Selena's performance who consistently danced across the stage, acknowledging her fans, and believed the standout moment during the show was when Selena and A. B., performed a duet to "Ven Conmigo" (1990). Campbell wrote how Selena received thunderous applause when she performed "Como la Flor", while contributor Thomas Korosec, noted that people lined up that day, had stretched nearly a city block shortly before Selena went on stage.

Subsequent to her July 1992 Mexico press conference, Selena "played her cards right" earning accolades from Mexican newspapers as "an artist of the people". Her refreshing presence diverged from the typical fair-skinned, blond-haired, and green-eyed Mexican telenovela actors. As a result, she secured bookings for numerous concerts throughout Mexico, including a critically acclaimed performance at Festival Acapulco in May 1993, where Patoski dubbed her "the only and absolute queen of the festival." Selena's concert at La Feria de Nuevo León on September 17, 1993, drew 70,000 attendees, and her return on October 5 solidified her status as the preeminent Tejano act in Mexico. In that same month, she appeared on Siempre en Domingo, which helped increased her popularity, as did her subsequent appearance on Veronica Castro's Y Vero América ¡Va!, which was shown throughout Latin America through Televisa. Writing for Vogue México y Latinoamérica, Esteban Villaseñor felt that Selena displayed "charisma, genuineness and talent" during her appearance on Castro's show.

During a performance in Monterrey, a sudden surge of attendees prompted Abraham to order everyone to hide in the tour bus, as he tried unsuccessfully to pacify the unruly crowd. Selena eventually returned to the stage, appealing for calm so the band could continue performing. Pérez described the concert as attended by "tens of thousands", and noted "the craziest, the most zealous fans" the band had were in Mexico. This incident was dramatized by Jennifer Lopez, who played Selena, in the 1997 Warner Bros. biopic about the singer. Oscar Flores, the band's Mexican tour manager, advised Selena and Pérez to conceal their marriage to preserve Selena's image. Despite their reluctance, they complied, believing Flores and Abraham were acting in their best interest. However, Selena eventually resolved to be truthful about her marriage in October 1993. In one instance, as she introduced Pérez as her husband, the crowd jeered, to which she responded that if she were married to one of them, they wouldn't boo. The crowd subsequently erupted in laughter and applause.

== Commercial performance ==
Entre a Mi Mundo sold 50,000 units in pre-sale copies, and made its debut at number nine on the US Billboard Regional Mexican Albums chart for the week ending June 13, 1992. Tejano music columnist, Rene Cabrera, described the album's Billboard debut as having ascended the chart with "soaring" momentum. On September 5, 1992, it peaked at number one, supplanting La Mafia's Estas Tocando Fuego. Cabrera regarded the event as a remarkable accomplishment, observing that Selena unseated La Mafia, one of the preeminent Tejano groups. He remarked on the distinctiveness of Selena within the Tejano music landscape, asserting that she is the foremost female artist in the genre. The album maintained the number one position for eight consecutive months, effectively preventing international artists Vicente Fernandez, Ana Gabriel, and Bronco from claiming the chart's apex. Writing for El Paso Times, Pifas Silva identified Selena as one of the genre's most commercially successful artists in the US. Regarding her success on the Billboard charts and in record sales, Selena expressed her astonishment, noting that the sustained presence on the charts likely indicated a continued interest in purchasing her album. Entre a Mi Mundo finished 1992 as the sixth best-selling US Regional Mexican Album. On July 10, 1993, the album made its entrance at number 10 on the newly established US Billboard Top Latin Albums chart. It ended 1993 as the best-selling US regional Mexican album.

In a 1992 recap, Entre a Mi Mundo contributed to the surpassing sales of the genre's "classic days" of the 1970s. The album became the first recording by a female Tejano singer to reach sales of 100,000, 200,000 units (December 1992), and 300,000 units by December 1993. Entre a Mi Mundo outperformed any prior female Tejano singer in terms of sales. and became the second all-time best-selling regional Mexican album in the US since Nielsen SoundScan began tracking sales in 1991. Entre a Mi Mundo became the first album by a Tejano woman to outsell men in the genre. Entre a Mi Mundo reached sales of 385,000 units by April 1994, and sold 200,000 units in Mexico. Entre a Mi Mundo spent at number one on the Regional Mexican Albums chart for 36 consecutive weeks by May 1993, breaking the record for most weeks at number one by a female Tejano artist.

On March 31, 1995, Selena was shot and killed. Media attention had helped increased sales of Entre a Mi Mundo as well as her back catalogue. Record stores were unable to meet demand, and as a result, EMI Latin increased the production of the singer's albums at their Los Angeles, California, and Greensboro, North Carolina plants. It was the fifth best-selling Latin album in southern California in the days following her death. Entre a Mi Mundo and Amor Prohibido (1994), rose 1,250% in sales in the eight weeks following her murder. Entre a Mi Mundo re-entered the Top Latin Albums chart, peaking at number four, all behind other Selena releases. It debuted at number 179 on the Billboard 200, and peaked at number 97 on May 6, 1995. In June, the album was certified Gold by the RIAA, for shipping 500,000 units in the country. It ended 1995 as the seventh best-selling US Latin album, while it was the fourth best-selling US Regional Mexican album, behind other releases by Selena. By 1997, Entre a Mi Mundo had sold 385,000 units in Mexico, the most sold by a female Tejano artist in the country. As of November 2017, Entre a Mi Mundo has been certified Diamond (Latin), denoting 600,000 album-equivalent units sold in the US. As of 2018, Entre a Mi Mundo has sold a combined 1,000,000 copies in the US and Mexico.

== Critical reception ==
=== Reviews ===
Professional ratings
Review scores
Source	Rating
AllMusic	3/5 stars
Entertainment Weekly	B
Spin	4/10

The preponderance of contemporary reviews lauded the album, bestowing widespread critical acclaim. Music critics identified the record as Selena's "breakthrough album", that catapulted her popularity to unprecedented heights across the United States and Mexico. Entre a Mi Mundo was Selena's "coming of age" album, along with its successor Amor Prohibido. Isabelia Herrera of Pitchfork opined that Entre a Mi Mundo helped dispel skepticism, from those who cast aspersions on Tejano music who deemed it excessively antiquated, blue-collar, or catering excessively to non-Latino audiences, by contemporizing the genre's conventions while upholding its loyalty to the working-class. Frida Garza of Texas Monthly felt that the album's release provided audiences invitation to enter the singer's world, as the title implies. Tim Baker in Newsweek believed Selena made a significant advancement from Ven Conmigo to Entre a Mi Mundo. He opined that Entre a Mi Mundo unveiled Selena's ability to adeptly encompass an extensive array of styles within a single endeavor, though retaining its foundation in Latin pop. Baker asserted that Entre a Mi Mundo mirrors its dramatic roots through emotionally evocative compositions and an emergent penchant for experimentation. Fiona Ortiz in The Oregonian said that Selena had "cranked the volume up" on Entre a Mi Mundo.

Joe Galván, writing in Texas Monthly, wrote how he devoted months to repeatedly listening to the album and was captivated by the agile keyboard foundations of the songs on the album. Cabrera called it a "barn-burner" recording. Bruce Tomaso of The Dallas Morning News attributed Selena's appeal to a "sizable audience" to her distinct Tejano pop and vocal prowess. Ramiro Burr from the San Antonio Express-News opined that Entre a Mi Mundo fortified the "Selena juggernaut", and felt her vocal technique, which he believed to be a fusion of Gloria Estefan's emotive tremors and Debbie Gibson's youthful timbre, has enhanced in scope and profundity. Guerra expressed how he was instantly captivated by "Selena's brand" of Tejano music and deemed the album a "diverse collection", attributing the singer's "transformation into a Latin music icon" to the record. Guerra felt that Entre a Mi Mundo contained more pop influences as Selena demonstrated growth as a singer and adeptness in interpreting songs on the album, while it became a milestone for the singer, that has retained its innovative sound well into the 21st century. David Browne, an editor for Entertainment Weekly, characterized the album as a "tentative potpourri of both modern and traditional styles". According to Jeremy Simmonds in his book The Encyclopedia of Dead Rock Stars (2012), songs in Entre a Mi Mundo could be perceived as rather unremarkable in nature. Domino Renee Perez, writing in the Houston Chronicle, posited that Entre a Mi Mundo "[served] as a gateway" for Selena's subsequent releases.

Entre a Mi Mundo brought in pop fans unfamiliar with Tejano music. According to Tarradell, Selena successfully fulfilled her potential in the album, which was designed to present her to a global audience. Tarradell concurred that the album marked Selena's foray into the Latin pop music market and served as a "star-making turn" for the solo artist. Entre a Mi Mundo made Selena "a superstar", and is featured on The History of Texas Music's recommended listen list.

=== Accolades ===
At the 1993 Lo Nuestro Awards, Selena tied with La Mafia's Estas Tocando Fuego for Best Regional Mexican Album for Entre a Mi Mundo. At the awards ceremony, "Como la Flor" won Regional Mexican Song of the Year. At the 1993 Tejano Music Awards, "Como la Flor" was nominated for Song of the Year but was dropped during preliminaries, which was considered a surprise according to Cabrera, who expected Selena to win the category. "La Carcacha" was nominated for Single of the Year, but was too, dropped. Selena's duet with Astudillo on "Siempre Estoy Pensando En Ti" was nominated for Vocal Duo of the Year. Entre a Mi Mundo won Album of the Year — Orchestra, and Selena was awarded Female Vocalist and Female Entertainer of the Year, which she had done the previous year as well.

== Track listing ==
Credits adapted from the liner notes of Entre a Mi Mundo, while all songs featured on the album were produced by A. B. Quintanilla unless specified.

No.	Title	Writer(s)	Length
1.	"Si La Quieres"	Ricky Vela	3:10
2.	"Como la Flor"	A. B. Quintanilla; Pete Astudillo	3:02
3.	"Yo Te Sigo Queriendo"	A. B.; Vela	3:08
4.	"¿Qué Creias?"	A. B.; Astudillo	3:30
5.	"Las Cadenas"	A. B.; Vela	3:54
6.	"Vuelve A Mí"	A. B.; Astudillo	3:37
7.	"La Carcacha"	A. B.; Astudillo	4:09
8.	"Siempre Estoy Pensando En Ti"	A. B.; Astudillo	3:01
9.	"Missing My Baby"	A. B.	3:48
10.	"Ámame"	Selena; Astudillo	3:37
Total length:			34:16

2002 re-release bonus tracks
No.	Title	Writer(s)	Producer(s)	Length
11.	"Buenos Amigos" (featuring Álvaro Torres)	Álvaro Torres	Enrique Elizondo	4:44
12.	"Where Did the Feeling Go?"	Michael Masser, Norman Saleet	Masser; A. B.	3:44
13.	"Spoken Liner Notes" (commentary recollections provided by Selena's family, friends, and her band)	Nir Seroussi	Suzette Quintanilla	12:42
14.	"La Carcacha" (music video)	A. B.; Astudillo		4:09
15.	"Buenos Amigos" (music video)	Torres		4:44

== Credits and personnel ==
Credits adapted from the liner notes of Entre a Mi Mundo.

Vocal credits

- Selena – vocals, background vocals, composer
- Pete Astudillo – background vocals
- A.B. Quintanilla – background vocals

Visuals and imagery

- Suzette Quintanilla – stylist
- Al Rendon – photography
- Lisette Lorenzo – art direction
- Lisy – artwork and design
- Ramon Hernandez – re-issue photography

Instruments

- Suzette Quintanilla – drums
- Chris Pérez – electric guitar
- A.B. Quintanilla – bass guitar
- Joe Ojeda – keyboards
- Ricky Vela – keyboards
- David Lee Garza – accordion
- Manny Guerra – accordion
- Joel Guzman – trumpet
- Rodney B. – guitar

Technical and production credits

- A. B. Quintanilla – composer, executive producer, programmer, mixer, arranger
- Ricky Vela – composer, programmer
- Jorge A. Pino – re-issue executive producer
- Brian "Red" Moore – engineering
- Nir Seroussi – editor
- Guillermo J. Page – reissue producer
- Manny Guerra – engineer
- Suzette Quintanilla – spoken liner notes producer

== Charts ==
=== Weekly charts ===
1992-95 Weekly chart performance for Entre a Mi Mundo
Chart (1992–95)	Peak position
US Billboard 200	97
US Top Latin Albums (Billboard)	4
US Regional Mexican Albums (Billboard)	1

=== All-time charts ===
All-time chart performance for Entre a Mi Mundo
Chart (1994)	Peak position
US Regional Mexican Albums (Billboard)	2

=== Year-end charts ===
Year-end chart performance for Entre a Mi Mundo
Chart (1992)	Position
US Regional Mexican Albums (Billboard)	6
Chart (1993)	Position
US Regional Mexican Albums (Billboard)	1
Chart (1994)	Position
US Top Latin Albums (Billboard)	30
Chart (1995)	Position
US Top Latin Albums (Billboard)	7
US Regional Mexican Albums (Billboard)	4

== Certifications and sales ==
Certifications and sales for Entre a Mi Mundo
Region	Certification	Certified units/sales
Mexico	—	385,000
United States (RIAA)	11× Platinum (Latin)	660,000^{‡}
^{‡} Sales+streaming figures based on certification alone.

== See also ==
- 1992 in Latin music
- Selena albums discography
- Latin American music in the United States
- Billboard Regional Mexican Albums Year-end Chart, 1990s
- List of number-one Billboard Regional Mexican Albums of 1992
- List of number-one Billboard Regional Mexican Albums of 1993
- Women in Latin music

== Bibliography ==
- "RIAA Gold & Platinum ("La Carcacha")". RIAA.com.
- "RIAA Gold & Platinum ("Como la Flor")". RIAA.com.
- "RIAA Gold & Platinum ("Que Creias")". RIAA.
- "RIAA Gold & Platinum (Entre a Mi Mundo)". RIAA.com.
- "Tejano Music Past Award Winners". Texas Talent Association. Archived from the original on September 30, 2000.
- "Hot Latin Songs > August 8, 1987". Billboard. August 8, 1987.
- "Billboard Year-end Charts > 1992" (PDF). Billboard. Vol. 104, no. 52. December 26, 1992. p. YE-40.
- "Hot Latin Songs > November 28, 1992". Billboard. Vol. 104, no. 48. November 28, 1992. p. 36.
- "Regional Mexican Albums > June 13, 1992". Billboard.
- "Regional Mexican Albums > September 5, 1992". Billboard.
- "Regional Mexican Albums > May 15, 1993". Billboard.
- "Top Tejano Singles". Austin American Statesman. September 2, 1992 – via Newspapers.com.
- "1992, The Year in Music" (PDF). Billboard. Vol. 104, no. 52. December 26, 1992. ISSN 0006-2510.
- "Discos Mas Populares > October 2, 1992". El Siglo de Torreón. October 2, 1992.
- "Hot Latin Songs > July 18, 1992" (PDF). Billboard. Vol. 104, no. 29. July 18, 1992. ISSN 0006-2510.
- "Hot Latin Songs > October 24, 1992" (PDF). Billboard. Vol. 104, no. 43. October 24, 1992. ISSN 0006-2510.
- "Top Latin Albums > July 10, 1993". Billboard.
- "1993 Tejano Music Award Nominess". El Paso Times. December 11, 1992 – via Newspapers.com.
- "Billboard Year-end Chart > 1993" (PDF). Billboard. Vol. 105, no. 52. December 25, 1993. p. YE-58.
- "Selena Appeals to fans in U.S. and Mexico". New Braunfels Herald-Zeitung. April 4, 1993.
- "Mexico Groupera Songs > January 26, 1993". El Siglo de Terron (in Spanish). January 26, 1993 – via Elsiglodeterron.mx.
- "Listas Mas Populares". El Siglo de Torreón. March 2, 1993.
- "Hot Latin Songs > November 28, 1992". Billboard. Vol. 104, no. 48. November 28, 1992. p. 36. ISSN 0006-2510.
- "Nominations for Lo Nuestro Awards, 1993" (PDF). Billboard. Vol. 105, no. 11. March 13, 1993. ISSN 0006-2510.
- "1994: The Year in Music". Billboard. Vol. 106, no. 52. December 24, 1994. p. 60.
- "Records". Spin. 11 (5). August 1995.
- "Daily Break". The Virginian-Pilot. August 11, 1995.
- "1995: The Year in Music" (PDF). Billboard. Vol. 107, no. 51. December 23, 1995. p. 78.
- "Record company planning Selena retrospective". Fort Worth Star-Telegram. April 12, 1995.
- "Billboard 200 > May 6, 1995". Billboard.
- "The Charts Selena Forever". The Los Angeles Times. April 9, 1995. ProQuest 293134870.
- Anon. (November 26, 2008). "Selena: Biography". Biography. 60 minutes in. A&E.
- "Selena: 25 años sin la reina del Tex-Mex". El Porvenir. March 30, 2020.
- Arrarás, María Celeste (1997). Selena's Secret: The Revealing Story Behind Her Tragic Death. Simon and Schuster. ISBN 0-684-83193-7.
- Baker, Tim (2018). "The Life and Legacy of Tejano's Queen". Newsweek (100). "A great leap forward compared to Ven Conmigo, Entre a Mi Mundo revealed Selena could tackle a wide variety of styles in a single project. While still composed of Latin pop tracks, the album delivers a diverse track list that won acclaim from critics. Traditionally flavored Mexican ballads like "Que Creias" appear alongside reggae influenced fare such as "La Carcacha". "Missing My Baby" was noticeably ahead of its time. Entre a Mi Mundo reflects its dramatic origins with emotionally charged music and a newfound love of experimentation."
- Barkley, Roy (2003). The Handbook of Texas Music. Austin, Texas: Texas State Historical Association in cooperation with the Center for Studies in Texas History at the University of Texas at Austin. ISBN 0876111932.
- Bogdanov, Vladimir (2001). All Music Guide: The Definitive Guide to Popular Music (4th ed.). San Francisco, CA: Backbeat Books. ISBN 0-87930-627-0.
- Browne, David (May 12, 1995). "Selena: Crossover Dreams". Entertainment Weekly. p. 2. Archived from the original on November 6, 2016.
- Blanco-Cano, Rosana; Urquijo-Ruiz, Rita E. (2011). Global Mexican cultural productions (1st ed.). Palgrave Macmillan. ISBN 978-0-230-37039-5.
- Bruns, Roger (2008). Icons of Latino America : Latino Contributions to American Culture (1st ed.). Westport, CT: Greenwood Press. ISBN 978-0-313-34087-1.
- Burr, Ramiro (February 25, 1993). "Selena poised for pop success".
- Burr, Ramiro (December 18, 1992). "1992 The Year Modern Tex-Mex Ecliped Classic Days of the '70s". El Paso Times – via Newspapers.com.
- Burr, Ramiro (February 23, 1993). "Selena Poised for Pop Success". Austin American Statesman – via Newspapers.com.
- Burr, Ramiro (May 16, 1993). "Top salsa and pop performers to vie for Latin Music Awards". Houston Chronicle – via Newsbank.
- Burr, Ramiro (April 23, 1994). "Tejano music". Billboard. Vol. 106, no. 17. p. 104.
- Burr, Ramiro (July 18, 1995). "Selena crosses over to pop – Posthumous release a reminder of talent cut short". San Antonio-Express News.
- Burr, Ramiro (March 26, 1996). "Selena hits gold on, off stage – Singer's wedding, break-through album highlight of 1990". San Antonio Express-News.
- Burr, Ramiro (June 12, 1998). "Auction of Selena's car triggers family rift". San Antonio Express-News.
- Burr, Ramiro (1999). The Billboard Guide to Tejano and Regional Mexican Music. Billboard Books. ISBN 0-8230-7691-1.
- Burr, Ramiro; Shannon, Doug (2003). Encyclopedia Latina. Scholastic Library Publishing. ISBN 0717258157.
- Cabrera, Rene (January 3, 1992). "More and More Mazz is Top Tejano Band". Corpus Christi Caller-Times – via Newspapers.com.
- Cabrera, Rene (June 19, 1992). "La Mafia, Tiger Diaz in Concert Friday". Corpus Christi Caller-Times – via Newspapers.com.
- Cabrera, Rene (September 4, 1992). "Labor Day Weekend Packed with Top Latin Acts". Corpus Christi Caller-Times – via Newspapers.com.
- Cabrera, Rene (September 18, 1992). "Selena, La Mafia, Mazz Topping the Charts". Corpus Christi Caller-Times – via Newspapers.com.
- Cabrera, Rene (December 25, 1992). "Top Groups End Year With Area Performances". Corpus Christi Caller-Times – via Newspapers.com.
- Cabrera, Rene (May 21, 1993). "Tejano Acts Moving Up the Billboard Charts". Corpus Christi Caller-Times – via Newspapers.com.
- Cabrera, Rene (February 26, 1993). "Mazz, Navaira Top Tejano Award Nominees". Corpus Christi Caller-Times – via Newspapers.com.
- Cabrera, Rene (March 5, 1993). "Selena, David Lee Draw Crowd in Houston". Corpus Christi Caller-Times – via Newspapers.com.
- Cabrera, Rene (May 29, 1998). "Double Bill on Saturday in Alice; Selena Still Atop Chart with Boxed Set". Corpus Christi Caller-Times – via Newspapers.com.
- Campbell, Elizabeth; Korosec, Thomas (April 26, 1993). "Tejano Musicians Celebrate Good Times at Cinco de Mayo". Fort Worth Star-Telegram – via Newspapers.com.
- Cobo, Leila (October 19, 2002). "Singles Review". Billboard. Vol. 114, no. 42. p. 20.
- Cohen, Howard (March 27, 1997). "Music Review". Springfield News-Sun.
- Chirinos, Fanny S (March 27, 2005). "Selena Fans Flock to City". Corpus Christi Caller-Times.
- Del Toro, Jesus (March 31, 2005). "Selena 10 Anos". Rumbo de San Antonio. "Lo mejor de Selena paso por las manos de Red. "Fue una sorpresa", recuerda Red. "Muchos pensaban que la que iba a pegar fuerte era "La Carcacha". Pero la cancion que toco el corazon de todos fue "Como la Flor". Esa cancion convirtio a Selena en la numero uno". Pero vendrian mas. "Todo el disco Amor Prohibido lo grabamos en dos semanas". "La primera noche hicimos las secuencias de las partes de teclados hasta las 4 am." Despues grabamos a los musicos y por ultimo, Selena grabo su parte en tiempo record: era maravillosa. El martes de la segunda semana me llama Abraham y me disc "Estare en San Antonio este fin de semana Puedes traerme una mezcla que pueda oir?" Entonces, terminamos todo, le llevamos la mezcla y el nos hacia sugerencias. Pero le encanto inmediatamente y yo me puse muy feliz." En plena entrevista entra Abraham al estudio. Al ver a Red, sonrie. "Red!", grita Abraham, abrazandolo. "El Rojo, El Colorado...A este tenemos que vestirlo de vikin go. Es un heroe."
- Doeden, Matt (2017). American Latin Music: Rumba Rhythms, Bossa Nova, and the Salsa Sound. Twenty-First Century Books. ISBN 978-1-4677-0147-1.
- Erlewine, Stephen Thomas. "Amor Prohibido > Album Review". Allmusic.
- Erlewine, Stephen Thomas. "Amor Prohibido > List of releases". Allmusic.
- Fernandez, Suzette (March 26, 2020). "Selena's First U.S. Hit 'Como La Flor' Compares a Withering Flower With Losing Love: See English Lyrics". Billboard.
- Garcia, Gus (July 26, 1993). "Selena, Sunny wow crowd A Review". Del Rio News Herald.
- Galván, Joe (April 2021). "In Selena, Queer Tejanos See Themselves as Brilliantly Transfigured and Free to Love Grandly". Texas Monthly. ProQuest 2544571844.
- Garza, Frida (April 2021). "Selena Embraced Her Heritage and Championed Its Evolution in Style". Texas Monthly. ProQuest 2544571779.
- Guerra, Joey (March 25, 2005). "Collective recordings of Selena span a number of genres". Houston Chronicle.
- Guerra, Joey (March 26, 2000). "Selena's Music Over the Years". Houston Chronicle – via Newsbank.
- Guerra, Joey (August 10, 2018). "Cover Story; The 50 Greatest Texas Musicians ever". Houston Chronicle – via Newsbank.
- Guerra, Joey (August 16, 2019). "The new Selena merch collection features a photo taken in Houston". Laredo Morning Times.
- Guerra, Joey (March 27, 2020). "These 24 Selena songs don't get played enough". Houston Chronicle.
- Hartman, Gary (2008). The History of Texas Music (1st ed.). College Station: Texas A & M University Press. p. 55. ISBN 978-1603443944.
- Herrera, Isabelia (March 26, 2022). "Selena: Amor Prohibido Album Review". Pitchfork.
- Johnston, Jerry (September 8, 1995). "Selena's Talent Shines on 'Dreaming of You'". Deseret News. Archived from the original on April 2, 2015.
- Jones, Veda Boyd (2013). Selena. Infobase Learning. ISBN 9781438146379.
- Jimenez, Abel (March 16, 2010). "15 Anos Sin Selena Consequimos Su Portafolios Nunca Visto". TvNotas. 11 (689). "En este disco se incluiria su cancion mas importante: "Como la Flor", asi como "La Carcacha", temas que marcaron su carrera y la consolidaron en el guesto del publico."
- Kanellos, Nicolás (2023). Latino almanac : from early explorers to corporate leaders. Visible Ink Press. ISBN 9781578597536.
- Koster, Rick (2000). Texas Music (1st ed.). St. Martin's Griffin. ISBN 9780312254254.
- Lannert, John (April 24, 1993). "Hot Latin Songs > April 24, 1993" (PDF). Billboard. Vol. 105, no. 17. p. 92.
- Lannert, John (May 22, 1993). "Hot Latin Songs > May 22, 1993". Billboard. Vol. 105, no. 22. p. 131.
- Lannert, John (June 3, 1995). "Posthumous Certifications For Selena". Billboard. Vol. 107, no. 22.
- Maldonado, Vilma (March 31, 1996). "Remembering Selena One Year Later". The Monitor.
- Mejias-Rentas, Antonio (April 13, 1995). "Selena, numero uno". La Opinión. 69 (210).
- Márquez, Herón (2001). Latin Sensations. Minneapolis: Lerner Publishing Group. ISBN 978-0-8225-4993-2.
- Mottola, Tommy (2016). A New America: How and Music Reshaped the Culture and Future of a Nation and Redefined My Life. Penguin Books. p. 105. ISBN 978-0451467782.
- McDonnell, Evelyn (2018). Women who rock : Bessie to Beyoncé, girl groups to riot grrrl (First ed.). Running Press. ISBN 9780316558860.
- Lannert, John; Bronson, Fred; Mayfield, Geoff (April 15, 1995). "Selena's Tragedy Echoed in Charts". Billboard. Vol. 107, no. 15. pp. 72, 80, 82.
- Novas, Himilce (1995). Remembering Selena (1st ed.). Sagebrush Education Resources. ISBN 0-613-92637-4.
- Oliva, John (August 25, 2022). "Selena: 11 deep cuts from the Queen of Tejano you should be listening to". Corpus Christi Caller-Times. ProQuest 2706102503.
- Ortiz, Fiona M. (April 19, 1995). "Latin Pop 101". The Oregonian. ProQuest 416861748.
- Parédez, Deborah (2009). Selenidad: Selena, Latinos, and the Performance of Memory. Duke University Press. ISBN 978-0-8223-9089-3.
- Patoski, Joe Nick (1996). Selena: Como La Flor. Boston: Little Brown and Company. ISBN 0-316-69378-2.
- Peña, Manuel (2002). Música Tejana. Texas A&M University. ISBN 978-0-89096-888-8.
- Pérez, Chris (2012). To Selena, with Love. Penguin Books. ISBN 978-1-101-58026-4.
- Perez, Domingo Renee (March 27, 2015). "Perez: For Americans of Mexican descent, Selena's music helped us tell our story". Houston Chronicle.
- Peoples, Glenn. "A Year Later: Michael Jackson's Massive Sales Impact". Billboard.
- Quintanilla, Selena (1998). Anthology (Media notes). Abraham Quintanilla (written biography). EMI Latin. 7243494110.
- Quintanilla, Selena (2002). Selena (Media notes). A.B. Quintanilla (producer), Suzette Quintanilla (spoken liner notes producer). EMI Latin. 724354099403.
- Quintanilla, Selena (2002). Ven Conmigo (Media notes). A.B. Quintanilla (producer), Suzette Quintanilla (spoken liner notes producer). EMI Latin.
- Quintanilla, Selena (2002). Entre a Mi Mundo (Media notes). A.B. Quintanilla (producer), Suzette Quintanilla (spoken liner notes producer). EMI Latin.
- Ragland, Kathy (March 24, 1996). "With Respect". Austin American Statesmen – via Newspapers.com.
- Ramirez, Erika (March 31, 2015). "Selena's Legacy: Remembering the Singer on the 20th Anniversary of Her Death". Billboard.
- Reynolds, J. R. (August 19, 1995). "The Rhythm and the Blues". Billboard. Vol. 107, no. 33.
- Romo, Ricardo (April 15, 2018). "Remembering Selena Quintanilla". La Prensa. ProQuest 2036686119.
- Saldana, Hector (October 27, 1995). "'Storm' in Liberty Band's musical forecast". San Antonio Express-News.
- San-Juan, Rocio (December 1992). "Selena y Los Dinos: La Revelacion del '92". Norteña Musical (23). "(1) Entro fuerte y con el pie derecho cantando su "Carcacha", cancion que le dio el exito definintivo entre el publico Mexicano. (2) Selena, Bronco, La Mafia, y Liberacion, fueron los grupos que mas sonaron en la radio durante 1992."
- Stacy, Lee (2002). Mexico and the United States. New York: Marshall Cavendish. ISBN 0-7614-7402-1.
- Silva, Pifas (September 11, 1993). "Paso Del Norte's Musical Lineup". Corpus Christi Caller-Times – via Newspapers.com.
- Simmonds, Jeremy (2012). The encyclopedia of dead rock stars : heroin, handguns, and ham sandwiches (Second ed.). Chicago Review Press. ISBN 9781613744789.
- Tamayo, Martin (June 23, 2020). "Conoce las canciones mexicanas más famosas de la de la historia en los EU". El Sol de Sinaloa.
- Tarradell, Mario (April 1, 1995). "Singer soared beyond traditional limits on Tejano music". The Dallas Morning News.
- Tarradell, Mario (January 25, 2001). "Stampede knifes through struggling Tejano scene". The Dallas Morning News.
- Tarradell, Mario (March 30, 2000). "A Decade of Selena: 10 albums showcase the music behind the legend". The Dallas Morning News.
- Tarradell, Mario (April 13, 2015). "On what would've been her 44th birthday, Selena's legend endures". The Dallas Morning News.
- Tomaso, Bruce (April 1, 1995). "Tejano superstar Selena slain in Corpus Christi". The Dallas Morning News.
- Villaseñor, Esteban (May 4, 2021). "La historia de una memorable entrevista de Selena Quintanilla en México". Vogue México y Latinoamérica (in Spanish).
- Verhovek, Sam Howe (April 1, 1995). "Grammy-Winning Singer Selena Killed in Shooting at Texas Motel". The New York Times. p. 1. Archived from the original on July 20, 2016.
- Wallace, Christian (February 25, 2016). "Texas, My Texas, You Deserve a New State Song". Texas Monthly. Gale A445117357.
