= Anthology (Selena album) =

Box set by Selena
- Released: April 7, 1998
- Recorded: 1985–1995
- Studio: Q-Productions
- Genres: Latin pop; Mariachi; Tejano cumbia
- Length: 1:50:01
- Languages: English, Spanish
- Label: EMI Latin
- Producers: A.B. Quintanilla; Abraham Quintanilla; Jose Hernandez

Selena chronology
Selena (1997)	Anthology (1998)	All My Hits: Todos Mis Exitos (1999)

Selena remix chronology
Siempre Selena (1996)	Anthology (1998)	Enamorada de Ti (2012)

Anthology is the first box set by American singer Selena. It was released posthumously on April 7, 1998, through EMI Latin to commemorate the singer's works. The collection comprises 30 tracks, dispersed across three genre-themed discs: "Pop / English" showcases uptempo pop compositions, "Mariachi" highlights Mexican ballads featuring poignant narratives of heartache, and "Cumbia" presents danceable tropical rhythms. The album encompasses recordings from a 14-year-old Selena on her Alpha (1986) album to the posthumous "Disco Medley" (1997). With a limited number of unaltered tracks, Anthology predominantly features reworked and remastered musical arrangements, while preserving the singer's original vocals. Selena's death in March 1995 prompted an influx of requests from her admirers. The singer's father and manager, Abraham Quintanilla, expressed a desire to maintain his daughter's legacy through her music. However, Selena's family has faced criticism from both fans and the media, who accuse them of capitalizing on her death and commodifying her repertoire.

The album garnered favorable acclaim from music critics, with Stephen Thomas Erlewine describing Anthology as a "comprehensive overview" of Selena's musical career. Erlewine posited that the compilation offers a diverse showcase of the artist's multifaceted talents. Echoing this sentiment, The Orlando Sentinel's critics noted that Anthology effectively demonstrates Selena's adeptness in performing across various genres. Upon its release, Anthology debuted at number one on the United States Billboard Top Latin Albums and Regional Mexican Albums chart, selling 10,500 units in its inaugural week. The album also reached number 131 on the Billboard 200 chart and maintained its position atop the Regional Mexican Albums chart for 11 weeks—the longest duration for any album in that year. Anthology ended 1998 as the best-selling Regional Mexican Albums chart in the US, while it placed 12th on the Top Latin Albums year-end chart. Anthology has been certified Diamond (Latin) by the Recording Industry Association of America (RIAA), denoting 600,000 units consisting of sales and on-demand streaming.

== Background and production ==
On March 31, 1995, American Tejano music singer Selena was shot and killed by Yolanda Saldívar, her friend and former manager of the singer's boutiques. Concurrently, the artist was engrossed in the development of a crossover, designed to propel her into the American pop market. The aftermath of her death yielded adverse consequences for Latin music, as the genre—which she had thrust into the mainstream market—experienced a decline in popularity in the wake of her death. The envisaged crossover album, Dreaming of You was posthumously released on July 18, 1995, debuting and peaking atop the United States Billboard 200 albums chart, an unprecedented feat for a predominantly Spanish-language recording in the chart's history. This release incited a "buying frenzy" among Hispanic and Latino Americans for any merchandise associated with or featuring Selena. The ongoing dissemination of Selena's oeuvre fulfills a commitment made by Abraham Quintanilla to his family in the aftermath of his daughter's death, vowing to perpetuate Selena's memory through her music. As stated by A. B. Quintanilla, Suzette Quintanilla, and Selena, the trio had collectively concurred that, should any misfortune befall one of them, their desire would be to persist with their musical endeavors. A. B. recounted that Selena expressed a wish for her presence to "never go away". In the years since Selena's death, her family has faced censure from fans and the media, who have accused them of exploiting the singer and capitalizing on her murder by commodifying her repertoire.

Enclosed within Anthology is a biographical booklet penned by Abraham, in which he recounts the numerous requests he received from individuals seeking a compilation of the singer's oeuvre, expressing his hope that the album fulfills the demand. EMI Latin lauded Anthology as the inaugural collection produced in honor of Selena. Throughout the production process, Abraham characterizes his family's emotions as a manifestation of "a labor of love" and dedicates the album to Selena's fans. He extends gratitude to them for their unwavering support in aiding Selena in realizing her musical ambitions.

== Music ==
Anthology encompasses a wide array of songs, ranging from a 14-year-old Selena's recordings featured on her Alpha (1986) album to the posthumously released club remix of "Disco Medley" (1997). As asserted by EMI Latin, Anthology commemorates the singer's works, encapsulating her earliest recordings up to some of the final sessions before her death. With a paucity of tracks in their original form, Anthology incorporates recordings that have been reimagined and refreshed with newly remastered musical arrangements, while preserving the singer's original vocals. The production team extracted Selena's vocals and thoroughly restructured the musical components. Selena's Los Dinos band expressed satisfaction with the album's final result. The compilation features tracks recorded by Selena prior to her affiliation with EMI Latin in 1989, while songs released during her engagement with the label were recorded under her father's studio, Q-Productions.

The first disc, thematically titled "Pop / English", commences with "Always Mine", an upbeat composition that became Selena's initial foray into English-language pop music, a long-standing aspiration for both her and A. B. upon entering the music industry. The remix rendition of "No Quiero Saber" featured on Anthology originates from Voces Unidas, the official Latin album for the 1996 Atlanta Olympics. The third track, "Don't Throw Away My Love" is a remix version of Selena's initial songwriting credit "My Love", derived from her 1989 debut album. The subsequent song, "La Bamba" is a cover of the eponymous track recorded by Ritchie Valens in the 1950s. The ensuing piece, "I'm Getting Used to You" underwent remixing by David Morales. "Yo Fui Aquella" initially appeared as a ranchera, but was revamped with updated arrangements, transitioning it into a ballad. This modification strips away the majority of the instrumentation, accentuating Selena's capacity to carry a tune unaided. The seventh track, "Captive Heart", was among the final songs Selena recorded before her death. The following tracks, "Amame" and "Missing My Baby", originally appeared on Entre a Mi Mundo (1992). "Disco Medley" (Club Remix) concludes the first disc's track listing. This track comprises a medley of disco-era songs, including Donna Summer's "Last Dance" (1978) and "On the Radio" (1979), Van McCoy and the Soul City Symphony's "The Hustle" (1975), Gloria Gaynor's "I Will Survive" (1978), Lipps Inc.'s "Funkytown" (1979). Selena performed "Disco Medley" live at the Houston Astrodome on February 26, 1995, widely acknowledged as her final concert before her death. Writing for The Orlando Sentinel, music critics Natalie Pignato and Umatilla High observed that the first disc maintains its rapid, accelerated beats from the initial track to the last.

The second disc, designated and themed "Mariachi", commences with "El Ramalazo", recorded by Selena in 1986. The subsequent track, "Dame Tu Amor", represents the inaugural collaborative composition between Abraham and keyboardist Ricky Vela in 1985. The version on Anthology is a bolero, enhanced with string and brass accompaniments. The third track, "Pa'Qué Me Sirve La Vida", originally a ranchera, undergoes a transformation into a "mariachi-valseada" through updated arrangements on Anthology. "Diferentes" was recorded by Selena in 1986 after appreciating Rocío Dúrcal's rendition of the piece. The fifth song, "Siempre Hace Frío", was initially intended for the Don Juan DeMarco (1995) soundtrack but was ultimately shelved by the music producers. The subsequent track, "¿Qué Creias?", frequently featured Selena performing onstage alongside a male volunteer from the audience who assumed the role of her former lover, while Selena rebuked them as the aggrieved partner. The seventh track, "Quiero Estar Contigo", penned by A. B., originally employed the accordion and keyboards in its 1987 incarnation, coinciding with the zenith of keyboard-driven track popularity. The following song, "Rama Caída", represents one of Selena's earliest recordings, executed when she was only 14 years old. The ensuing song, "Sabes", was composed by Vela and particularly admired by Abraham, who lauded it as one of Vela's finest works. The track is succeeded by the mariachi composition "Tú Sólo Tú", also initially intended for the Don Juan DeMarco soundtrack, which concludes the second disc's track listing. The second disc exudes a subdued presence, encompassing Mexican ballads characterized by narratives of heartbreak.

Initiating the third disc, titled and themed "Cumbia", is "Yo Te Daré", which was modernized for Anthology alongside "La Puerta Se Cerró". The former, originally a salsa track from 1988, was updated to mirror the arrangements found in "Si Una Vez" (1994). In the album, it manifests as a cumbia with comprehensive mariachi instrumentation, accentuated by accordion and requinto elements. The third track, "Corazoncito" appears on Anthology in what Abraham dubs "an even funkier arrangement." Originally recorded in 1985 as a ballad, "Enamorada de Ti" commences slowly but swiftly metamorphoses into a contemporary pop cumbia. The fifth track, "No Debes Jugar" originally appeared on Selena Live! This is succeeded by "Cariño Mío", which ranked among the most-requested songs for Selena to perform in the 1980s. The track underwent a transformation from cumbia to tropical salsa. The subsequent song, "Salta La Ranita", is updated with an accordion, offering listeners a richer tapestry of instrumentation compared to its original minimalist rendition. In the eighth song, "Te Amo Solo A Ti", producers extracted Selena's vocals from the initial track and overlaid them onto a hybrid rhythm fusing cumbia and ranchera. Abraham expressed astonishment at the updated song's natural sound, given the stark stylistic disparities between cumbia and ranchera. The penultimate song, "La Llamada" features the protagonist's former lover contacting her and asserting his innocence; however, rejecting his justifications, she demands he cease contacting her. The third disc culminates with "Baila Esta Cumbia", previously included in Ven Conmigo (1990). According to critics Pignato and High, the third disc encompasses a greater number of Selena's finest works compared to the preceding discs.

== Release and reception ==
Professional ratings
Review scores
Source	Rating
Allmusic	4/5 stars

Originally slated for release on March 31, 1998, Anthology was deferred to April 7 due to insufficient inventory in music stores. The label, anticipating high demand for the album, deemed this a "sensitive issue" and consequently postponed the release by an additional week. Anthology is a triple box set comprising 30 tracks across three compact discs or cassette tapes, with each genre-themed volume containing ten tracks.

The album has garnered positive responses from music critics. Writing for Allmusic, Stephen Thomas Erlewine described Anthology as a "comprehensive overview" of Selena's musical career, providing listeners with a diverse array of the singer's talents. However, he noted the absence of some of her best works, such as "Dreaming of You" (1995). Echoing Erlewine's sentiments, The Orlando Sentinel's music critics Pignato and High asserted that Anthology exemplifies Selena's prowess in recording songs spanning various genres. They further opined that the album represents the singer's "crossover dream come true" more so than its posthumous predecessors, deeming it a "must-have for fans". Rosanna Ruiz of Fort Worth Star-Telegram contended that the album showcases Selena's extensive talents across the three explored genres.

Like its predecessors, Anthology is designed to highlight Selena's aptitude for singing an assortment of styles—from Anglo pop to mariachi—without alienating her devoted Tejano fanbase. Joey Guerra of the Houston Chronicle asserted that Anthology offers fans a glimpse of a singer refining her skills and embracing her talent. In addition to featuring rarely heard tracks, the album spotlights the production talents of A. B., who produced the songs with fresh arrangements. Jesse Katz in Texas Monthly observed that Anthology eschews labeling any section as Tejano, a genre that is not marketable in larger markets such as New York and Miami, where salsa and merengue music dominate. Conversely, Tejano music encompasses pop melodies that are excessively Americanized for the banda and norteño markets in Mexico and Southern California. In his review of the subsequent release, All My Hits: Todos Mis Éxitos (1999), Newsday music critic Richard Torres recommended Anthology for those interested in exploring more of Selena's songs.

== Commercial performance ==
Fernando del Valle, writing for The Monitor, discovered multiple music retailers in the Rio Valley displaying Anthology in advance of its official release. Laura Fajardo, manager of Camelot Music in Harlingen, Texas, observed that while "Selena fever" persists, it is not as fervent as before. A record store in Fort Worth similarly reported customers inquiring about the album, though interest has diminished compared to the period immediately following her death. EMI Latin distributed 300,000 units to stores throughout the US in anticipation of the release.

Anthology debuted at number one on the US Billboard Top Latin Albums and Regional Mexican Albums chart on the issue dated April 25, 1998. This marked Selena's third consecutive Top Latin Album number-one debut, following Siempre Selena (1996) and Dreaming of You (1995). Anthology extended Selena's record for the most cumulative weeks an artist has spent at number one, totaling 65 weeks atop the Top Latin Albums chart since Nielsen SoundScan began tabulating Latin album sales in 1993. The album sold 10,500 units, less than its predecessor Siempre Selena, which debuted with 14,500 units, while it entered the Billboard 200 chart at number 144. The album's sales contributed to pushing Latin album sales in the United States above 90,000 units for the first time in a month, surpassing sales of Latin albums in the US during the same period in 1997. Anthology sold 3,500 more units than Ricky Martin's Vuelve, displacing it from the top position.

The Mother's Day weekend holiday typically represents one of the highest-selling periods for Latin albums in the United States. However, Anthology sold 8,500 units, a 5% decrease from the previous tracking week. John Lannert of Billboard magazine expressed surprise that Anthology did not experience a sales increase that week. The album maintained its number one position on the Top Latin Albums and Regional Mexican Albums charts for the sixth consecutive week, while it slipped to number 151 on the Billboard 200 chart. Anthology remained at the summit of the Regional Mexican Albums chart for 11 weeks, constituting the most weeks an album has held the number one position, and secured the third-most weeks atop the Top Latin Albums chart for the year. Anthology's performance contributed to EMI Latin's ranking as the third-best-performing record imprint on Billboard's Latin music recap report, with the album placed at number nine in the Top Latin Albums recap report. Anthology ended 1998 as the best-selling regional Mexican album in the United States, while it placed 12th on the Top Latin Albums year-end chart. The set sold 116,000 units by December 1998, making it the best-selling album by EMI Latin for the year. The album was certified diamond by the Recording Industry Association of America (RIAA), denoting 600,000 units consisting of sales and on-demand streaming.

== Track listing ==
Disc 01: Pop / English
No.	Title	Writer(s)	Remixed by	Length
1.	"Always Mine" (previously on Dulce Amor)	A. B. Quintanilla	A. B., Chris Fonseca	3:36
2.	"No Quiero Saber" (previously on Ven Conmigo)	A. B., Pete Astudillo		3:40
3.	"Don't Throw Away My Love" (previously unreleased remix of "My Love")	Selena Quintanilla—Perez	A. B., Fonseca	3:38
4.	"La Bamba" (previously on And the Winner Is...)	Luis Martínez Serrano, Ritchie Valens	Brian "Red" Moore, Ray Paz	3:52
5.	"I'm Getting Used to You (Def Club Remix)" (previously on "I'm Getting Used to You" single)	Diane Warren	A. B., Fonseca, David Morales	8:36
6.	"Yo Fuí Aquella" (previously on Preciosa)	A. B.		3:34
7.	"Captive Heart" (previously on Dreaming of You)	Mark Goldberg, Kit Hain	A. B., Fonseca	4:23
8.	"Amame" (previously on Entre a Mi Mundo)	Selena, Astudillo		3:38
9.	"Missing My Baby" (previously on Entre a Mi Mundo)	A. B.		3:51
10.	"Disco Medley: Last Dance/The Hustle/On the Radio (Club Remix)" (previously on "Disco Medley" single)	Van McCoy, Giorgio Moroder, Donna Summer	A. B., Fonseca	6:10

Disc 02: Mariachi
No.	Title	Writer(s)	Arranged by	Length
1.	"El Ramalazo" (previously on Muñequito de Trapo)	Tomás Méndez	"Red", Paz	2:52
2.	"Dáme Tu Amor" (previously on Alpha)	Abraham Quintanilla, Ricky Vela	"Red", Paz	3:45
3.	"Pa'Qué Me Sirve La Vida" (previously on Alpha)	Jesús Monge	"Red", Paz	2:52
4.	"Diferentes" (previously on Muñequito de Trapo)	Juan Gabriel	"Red", Paz	3:16
5.	"Siempre Hace Frío" (previously on Siempre Selena)	Cuco Sánchez	Jose Hernandez	3:13
6.	"¿Qué Creías?" (previously on Entre a Mi Mundo)	A. B., Astudillo	"Red", Paz	3:30
7.	"Quiero Estar Contigo" (previously on Preciosa)	A. B., Jankarlos Nunez	"Red", Paz	2:28
8.	"Rama Caída" (previously on Muñequito de Trapo)	Juan H. Barrón	"Red", Paz	4:26
9.	"Sabes" (previously on Preciosa)	Vela	"Red", Paz	2:24
10.	"Tú, Solo Tú" (previously on Dreaming of You)	Felipe Valdés Leal	Hernandez	3:12

Disc 03: Cumbia
No.	Title	Writer(s)	Arranged by	Length
1.	"Yo Te Daré" (previously on And the Winner Is...)	A. B.	"Red", Paz	3:14
2.	"La Puerta Se Cerró" (previously on Dulce Amor)	Copyright Control	"Red", Paz	3:49
3.	"Corazoncito" (previously on Alpha)	A. B., Manny Guerra	"Red", Paz	2:48
4.	"Enamorada de Ti" (previously on Munequito de Trapo)	Luisa Fatello, Teresa Presmanes	"Red", Paz	4:00
5.	"No Debes Jugar" (previously on Selena Live!)	A. B., Vela	Los Dinos	2:51
6.	"Cariño Mio" (previously on Preciosa)	Vela	"Red", Paz	3:35
7.	"Salta La Ranita" (previously on And the Winner Is...)	Víctor H. Garza	"Red", Paz	3:12
8.	"Te Amo Solo a Ti" (previously on And the Winner Is...)	E.J. Ledesma	"Red", Paz	3:33
9.	"La Llamada" (previously on Selena Live!)	A. B., Astudillo	Los Dinos	3:09
10.	"Baila Esta Cumbia" (previously on Ven Conmigo)	A. B., Astudillo	Los Dinos	2:54
Total length:				1:50:01

== Personnel ==
Credits are adapted from the album's liner notes.

Musicians

- Selena –lead vocals
- Rolando Hernández –guitarist (tracks 1.04, 2.01—2.10, 3.02), vihuela (tracks 2.01—2.10, 3.02), background vocals (track 2.07)
- Roger Vera –trumpets (tracks 1.04, 2.01—2.10, 3.02)
- Mariachi Sol de Mexico – chorus (tracks 1.05, 1.10)
- Joe Murillo – guitarron (tracks 2.01—2.10, 3.02)
- Andy Wilson – violins (tracks 2.01—2.10, 3.02)
- Veronica Salinas – violins (tracks 2.01—2.10, 3.02)
- Tom McClung – violins (tracks 2.01—2.10, 3.02)
- Johnny Saenz – accordion (tracks 2.08, 3.01—3.10)
- Mateo Garcia – requinto (tracks 2.03, 2.05, 3.02)
- Mark Basaldua – background vocals (track 2.07)
- Jessie Garcia – background vocals (track 2.07)
- Jesse Ybarra – guitarist (tracks 3.01—3.04, 3.06—3.08)
- Favio Pinot – timbales (tracks 3.01—3.10)
- Lorena Pinot – background vocals (tracks 3.01—3.10)
- Suzette Quintanilla – drums (tracks 3.05, 3.09—3.10)
- Ricky Vela – keyboardist (tracks 3.05, 3.09—3.10)
- Joe Ojeda – keyboardist (tracks 3.05, 3.09—3.10)
- Chris Pérez – guitarist (tracks 3.05, 3.09—3.10)

Production

- Jose Behar – executive producer
- A. B. Quintanilla – producer, background vocals (track 2.07), remixer, arrangement (tracks 1.01, 1.02, 1.03, 1.05, 1.07, 1.10), bass (tracks 3.05, 3.09—3.10)
- Abraham Quintanilla – producer, liner notes
- Brian "Red" Moore – arrangement (tracks 1.04, 2.01—2.04, 2.06—2.09, 3.01—3.10), bass (tracks 3.01—3.04, 3.06—3.8)
- Ray Paz – producer, arrangement, remixer (tracks 1.04, 2.01—2.04, 2.06—2.09, 3.01—3.10), background vocals (track 2.07)
- David Morales – remixer (track 1.05)
- Los Dinos – arranger (tracks 1.09, 3.05, 3.09—3.10)
- José Hernández – arranger (tracks 2.05, 2.10)

Packaging

- Nelson Gonzalez – art & packagining, production coordinator
- Impressions Design – design, art direction

== Charts ==
=== Weekly charts ===
Weekly chart performance for Anthology
Chart (1998)	Peak position
US Billboard 200 (Billboard)	131
US Top Latin Albums (Billboard)	1

=== Quarterly charts ===
Quarterly chart performance for Anthology
Chart (1998)	Peak position
US Regional Mexican Albums (Billboard)	2

=== Year-end charts ===
Year-end chart performance for Anthology
Chart (1998)	Peak position
US Top Latin Albums (Billboard)	12
US Regional Mexican Albums (Billboard)	1

== Certification ==
Certification for Anthology
Region	Certification	Certified units/sales
United States (RIAA)	Diamond (Latin)	600,000^{‡}
^{‡} Sales+streaming figures based on certification alone.

== See also ==
- List of number-one Billboard Top Latin Albums from the 1990s
- List of number-one Billboard Regional Mexican Albums of 1998
- List of number-one debuts on Billboard Top Latin Albums
- Billboard Regional Mexican Albums Year-end Chart, 1990s
