= List of Billboard Regional Mexican Albums number ones of 1993 =

The Regional Mexican Albums, published in Billboard magazine, is a record chart that features Latin music sales information for regional styles of Mexican music. This data are compiled by Nielsen SoundScan from a sample that includes music stores, music departments at department stores and verifiable sales from concert venues in the United States. Billboard would publish a bi weekly chart up until July 17, 1993 when Billboard switched to publishing a weekly chart going forward.

== Albums ==
Issue Date	Album	Artist	Reference
January 2	Entre a Mi Mundo	Selena	
January 9	Entre a Mi Mundo	Selena	
January 16	Entre a Mi Mundo	Selena	
January 23	Entre a Mi Mundo	Selena	
January 30	Entre a Mi Mundo	Selena	
February 6	Entre a Mi Mundo	Selena	
February 13	Entre a Mi Mundo	Selena	
February 20	Entre a Mi Mundo	Selena	
February 27	Entre a Mi Mundo	Selena	
March 6	Entre a Mi Mundo	Selena	
March 13	Entre a Mi Mundo	Selena	
March 20	Entre a Mi Mundo	Selena	
March 27	Entre a Mi Mundo	Selena	
April 3	Entre a Mi Mundo	Selena	
April 10	Entre a Mi Mundo	Selena	
April 17	Entre a Mi Mundo	Selena	
April 24	Entre a Mi Mundo	Selena	
May 1	Entre a Mi Mundo	Selena	
May 8	Entre a Mi Mundo	Selena	
May 15	Ahora Y Siempre	La Mafia	
May 22	Entre a Mi Mundo †	Selena	
May 29	Entre a Mi Mundo †	Selena	
June 5	Entre a Mi Mundo †	Selena	
June 12	Ahora y Siempre †	La Mafia	
June 19	Ahora y Siempre †	La Mafia	
June 26	Ahora y Siempre †	La Mafia	
July 3	Ahora y Siempre †	La Mafia	
July 10	Live!	Selena	
July 17	Live!	Selena	
July 24	Live!	Selena	
July 31	Ahora y Siempre †	La Mafia	
August 7	Live! †	Selena	
August 14	Live! †	Selena	
August 21	Live! †	Selena	
August 28	Live! †	Selena	
September 4	Live! †	Selena	
September 11	Live! †	Selena	
September 18	Live! †	Selena	
September 25	Live! †	Selena	
October 2	Live! †	Selena	
October 9	Live! †	Selena	
October 16	Live! †	Selena	
October 23	Live! †	Selena	
October 30	Live! †	Selena	
November 6	Live! †	Selena	
November 13	Live! †	Selena	
November 20	Live! †	Selena	
November 27	Live! †	Selena	
December 4	Que Esperabas	Mazz	
December 11	Que Esperabas	Mazz	
December 18	Que Esperabas	Mazz	
December 25	Que Esperabas	Mazz	
