= List of Billboard Regional Mexican Albums number ones of 1992 =

The Regional Mexican Albums, published in Billboard magazine, is a record chart that features Latin music sales information for regional styles of Mexican music. This data are compiled by Nielsen SoundScan from a sample that includes music stores, music departments at department stores and verifiable sales from concert venues in the United States.

== Albums ==
Issue Date	Album	Artist	Reference
January 4	Mazz Live-Una Noche Juntos	Mazz	
January 11	Mi México	Ana Gabriel	
January 18	Mi México	Ana Gabriel	
January 25	Salvaje y Tierno	Grupo Bronco	
February 1	Mi México †	Ana Gabriel	
February 8	Mi México †	Ana Gabriel	
February 15	Mi México †	Ana Gabriel	
February 22	Mazz Live-Una Noche Juntos †	Mazz	
February 29	Mazz Live-Una Noche Juntos †	Mazz	
March 7	Mi Vida Eres Tú	Los Temerarios	
March 14	Mi Vida Eres Tú	Los Temerarios	
March 21	Estas Tocando Fuego	La Mafia	
March 28	Estas Tocando Fuego	La Mafia	
April 4	Estas Tocando Fuego	La Mafia	
April 11	Estas Tocando Fuego	La Mafia	
April 18	Estas Tocando Fuego	La Mafia	
April 25	Estas Tocando Fuego	La Mafia	
May 2	Estas Tocando Fuego	La Mafia	
May 9	Estas Tocando Fuego	La Mafia	
May 16	Estas Tocando Fuego	La Mafia	
May 23	Estas Tocando Fuego	La Mafia	
May 30	Estas Tocando Fuego	La Mafia	
June 7	Estas Tocando Fuego	La Mafia	
June 14	Estas Tocando Fuego	La Mafia	
June 21	Estas Tocando Fuego	La Mafia	
June 28	Estas Tocando Fuego	La Mafia	
July 4	Estas Tocando Fuego	La Mafia	
July 11	Estas Tocando Fuego	La Mafia	
July 18	Estas Tocando Fuego	La Mafia	
July 25	Estas Tocando Fuego	La Mafia	
August 1	Estas Tocando Fuego	La Mafia	
August 8	Estas Tocando Fuego	La Mafia	
August 15	Estas Tocando Fuego	La Mafia	
August 22	Estas Tocando Fuego	La Mafia	
August 29	Estas Tocando Fuego	La Mafia	
September 5	Entre a Mi Mundo	Selena	
September 12	Entre a Mi Mundo	Selena	
September 19	Entre a Mi Mundo	Selena	
September 26	Entre a Mi Mundo	Selena	
October 3	Entre a Mi Mundo	Selena	
October 10	Entre a Mi Mundo	Selena	
October 17	Entre a Mi Mundo	Selena	
October 24	Entre a Mi Mundo	Selena	
October 31	Entre a Mi Mundo	Selena	
November 7	Entre a Mi Mundo	Selena	
November 14	Entre a Mi Mundo	Selena	
November 21	Entre a Mi Mundo	Selena	
November 28	Entre a Mi Mundo	Selena	
December 5	Entre a Mi Mundo	Selena	
December 12	Entre a Mi Mundo	Selena	
December 19	Entre a Mi Mundo	Selena	
December 26	Entre a Mi Mundo	Selena	
