= List of Billboard Regional Mexican Albums number ones of 1998 =

The Regional Mexican Albums, published in Billboard magazine, is a record chart that features Latin music sales information for regional styles of Mexican music. This data are compiled by Nielsen SoundScan from a sample that includes music stores, music departments at department stores and verifiable sales from concert venues in the United States.

== Albums ==
Issue Date	Album	Artist	Reference
January 3	De Fiesta Con...	Los Tucanes de Tijuana	
January 10	De Fiesta Con...	Los Tucanes de Tijuana	
January 17	Asi Como Tu	Los Tigres del Norte	
January 24	Asi Como Tu	Los Tigres del Norte	
January 31	Asi Como Tu	Los Tigres del Norte	
February 7	Asi Como Tu	Los Tigres del Norte	
February 14	Asi Como Tu	Los Tigres del Norte	
February 21	Como Te Recuerdo	Los Temerarios	
February 28	Como Te Recuerdo	Los Temerarios	
March 7	Como Te Recuerdo	Los Temerarios	
March 14	Como Te Recuerdo	Los Temerarios	
March 21	Como Te Recuerdo	Los Temerarios	
March 28	Como Te Recuerdo	Los Temerarios	
April 4	Asi Como Tu †	Los Tigres del Norte	
April 11	Asi Como Tu †	Los Tigres del Norte	
April 18	Confesiones De Amor	Los Ángeles Azules	
April 25	Anthology	Selena	
May 2	Anthology	Selena	
May 9	Anthology	Selena	
May 16	Anthology	Selena	
May 23	Anthology	Selena	
May 30	Anthology	Selena	
June 6	Anthology	Selena	
June 13	Anthology	Selena	
June 20	Anthology	Selena	
June 27	Anthology	Selena	
July 4	Anthology	Selena	
July 11	Intocable	Intocable	
July 18	Amor Platonico	Los Tucanes de Tijuana	
July 25	Amor Platonico	Los Tucanes de Tijuana	
August 1	Amor Platonico	Los Tucanes de Tijuana	
August 8	Amor Platonico	Los Tucanes de Tijuana	
August 15	Amor Platonico	Los Tucanes de Tijuana	
August 22	Amor Platonico	Los Tucanes de Tijuana	
August 29	Amor Platonico	Los Tucanes de Tijuana	
September 5	Amor Platonico	Los Tucanes de Tijuana	
September 12	Amor Platonico	Los Tucanes de Tijuana	
September 19	Un Juego De Amor	Grupo Bryndis	
September 26	Amor Platonico	Los Tucanes de Tijuana	
October 3	Los Super Seven	Los Super Seven	
October 10	Los Super Seven	Los Super Seven	
October 17	Los Super Seven	Los Super Seven	
October 24	Los Super Seven	Los Super Seven	
October 31	Los Super Seven	Los Super Seven	
November 7	De Corazon Al Corazon	Limite	
November 14	De Corazon Al Corazon	Limite	
November 21	De Corazon Al Corazon	Limite	
November 28	15 Exitos Para Siempre	Los Temerarios	
December 5	Los Mas Buscados	Los Tucanes de Tijuana	
December 12	Los Mas Buscados	Los Tucanes de Tijuana	
December 19	Los Mas Buscados	Los Tucanes de Tijuana	
December 26	Los Mas Buscados	Los Tucanes de Tijuana	
