= Billboard Regional Mexican Albums Year-end Chart, 1990s =

The Year-End charts for the Regional Mexican Albums chart in the 1990s are published in the last issue of Billboard magazine every year. The chart was based on information provided by Nielsen Broadcast Data Systems, which collected a survey from music retail shops and one-stop sales in the United States until May 1991 when the methodology was changed to include point-of-sale data compiled from Nielsen SoundScan. The Year-End charts represent aggregated numbers from the weekly charts that were compiled for each artist, album and record company.

Mexican group Bronco had the best-selling album of 1990 with A Todo Galope. Beginning in 1992, Tejano music musicians dominated the year-end chart for five consecutive years; with La Mafia having the best-selling album of the year with their critically acclaimed recording Estas Tocando Fuego. Selena had the best-selling album of the year from 1993 to 1996 with Entre a Mi Mundo and Amor Prohibido (1994–96). The former became the only recording in the 1990s to have been named the best-selling Regional Mexican Album of the year for three consecutive times. The singer became the only female musician to have a year-end best-seller in the 1990s. Selena continued her streak of best-selling year-end albums with Anthology (1998) and All My Hits/Todos Mis Exitos (1999) following her death in March 1995. Other female singers to have appeared on the year-end chart includes Mexican singer Ana Gabriel whose album Mi Mexico was the second best-seller of 1992, while Gabriel's Con Un Mismo Corazon ranked fifth in 1998. Linda Ronstadt's double diamond certified album Canciones de Mi Padre ranked eighth and third on the year-end charts in 1993 and 1994, respectively. Grupo Límite's previous work, Por Puro Amor peaked at number one on the Regional Mexican Albums chart in 1996, it was replaced from the top with their album Partiendome el Alma; which became the best-selling album of 1997.

In 1995, Tejano musicians dominated the year-end chart with eight best-selling albums in the top ten; most of these were Selena. Seven different Tejano singers ranked within the top ten of the best-selling albums of 1996. Following this, the only performers of Tejano music that appeared in the top ten were Selena and Intocable; whose albums IV (1998) and Contigo (1999) ranked tenth in their respective years. Los Tigres del Norte placed a total of eight albums within the top ten including Jefe de Jefes, which is one of the best-selling Latin albums in the United States.

== Regional Mexican Albums of the Year ==
‡ – represents the best-performing single of the year.

Year	Rank	Album	Performer
1990	1	A Todo Galope ‡	Grupo Bronco
1990	2	No Te Olvidare	Mazz
1990	3	Mi Buena Suerte	Los Tigres del Norte
1990	4	Por Tu Maldito Amor	Vicente Fernández
1990	5	A Tu Recuerdo	Los Yonic's
1990	6	Enter the Future	La Mafia
1990	7	Tristes Recuerdos	Ramon Ayala
1990	8	Mi Acordeon y Yo	Ramon Ayala
1990	9	El Que Más Te Ha Querido	David Lee Garza
1990	10	No Cantan Mal Las Rancheras	Los Caminantes
1992	1	Estas Tocando Fuego ‡	La Mafia
1992	2	Mi Mexico	Ana Gabriel
1992	3	Salvaje y Tierno	Bronco
1992	4	Live–Una Noche Juntos	Mazz
1992	5	Mi Vida Eres Tu	Los Temerarios
1992	6	Entre a Mi Mundo	Selena
1992	7	Mas Canciones	Linda Ronstadt
1992	8	La Hielera	Los Acuario
1992	9	Romanticamente	Yndio
1992	10	Alejandro Fernández	Alejandro Fernández
1993	1	Entre a Mi Mundo ‡	Selena
1993	2	Ahora y Siempre	La Mafia
1993	3	Live!	Selena
1993	4	Con Sangre De Indio	Banda Machos
1993	5	Lo Hare Por Ti	Mazz
1993	6	Por El Mundo	Bronco
1993	7	Casimira	Banda Machos
1993	8	Canciones de mi Padre	Linda Ronstadt
1993	9	Mas Canciones	Linda Ronstadt
1993	10	Que De Raro Tiene	Vicente Fernández
1994	1	Amor Prohibido ‡	Selena
1994	2	Pura Sangre	Grupo Bronco
1994	3	Canciones de mi Padre	Linda Ronstadt
1994	4	Que Esperabas	Mazz
1994	5	Live!	Selena
1994	6	Tu Ultima Cancion	Los Temerarios
1994	7	Southern Exposure	Emilio Navaira
1994	8	Los Dos Plebes	Los Tigres del Norte
1994	9	En Grande	Fama
1994	10	Los Machos Tambien Lloran	Banda Machos
1995	1	Amor Prohibido ‡	Selena
1995	2	12 Super Exitos	Selena
1995	3	Live!	Selena
1995	4	Entre a Mi Mundo	Selena
1995	5	Las Reinas del Pueblo	Selena and Graciela Beltrán
1995	6	Exitos en Vivo	La Mafia
1995	7	El Ejemplo	Los Tigres del Norte
1995	8	La Diferenzia	La Diferenzia
1995	9	Rompiendo Barreras	Bronco
1995	10	Soundlife	Emilio Navaira
1996	1	Amor Prohibido ‡	Selena
1996	2	Unidos Para Siempre	Los Tigres del Norte
1996	3	Un Millon de Rosas	La Mafia
1996	4	Como Te Extrano	Pete Astudillo
1996	5	Por Puro Amor	Grupo Límite
1996	6	Pedro Fernández	Pedro Fernández
1996	7	Dulzura	Jennifer Peña
1996	8	En Concierto	Michael Salgado
1996	9	Llevame Contigo	Intocable
1996	10	Solo Para Ti	Mazz
1997	1	Partiendome el Alma ‡	Grupo Límite
1997	2	Siempre Selena	Selena
1997	3	Jefe de Jefes	Los Tigres del Norte
1997	4	Tucanos de Oro	Los Tucanes de Tijuana
1997	5	Deseos y Delirios	Pedro Fernández
1997	6	Juntos Otra Vez	Juan Gabriel and Rocío Dúrcal
1997	7	Muy Dentro De Mi Corazon	Alejandro Fernández
1997	8	Tucanos de Plata	Los Tucanes de Tijuana
1997	9	La Última Huella	Bronco
1997	10	Por Puro Amor	Grupo Límite
1998	1	Anthology ‡	Selena
1998	2	Sentimientos	Grupo Límite
1998	3	Como Te Recuerdo	Los Temerarios
1998	4	De Fiesta Con...	Los Tucanes de Tijuana
1998	5	Con Un Mismo Corazon	Ana Gabriel
1998	6	Asi Como Tu	Los Tigres del Norte
1998	7	Amor Platonico	Los Tucanes De Tijuana
1998	8	Partiendome el Alma	Grupo Límite
1998	9	Entre El Amor y Yo	Vicente Fernández
1998	10	IV	Intocable
1999	1	All My Hits/Todos Mis Exitos ‡	Selena
1999	2	Nuestro Amor	Los Tri-o
1999	3	Herencia de Familia	Los Tigres del Norte
1999	4	Entre el Amor y Yo	Vicente Fernández
1999	5	15 Exitos Para Siempre	Los Temerarios
1999	6	Mi Verdad	Alejandro Fernández
1999	7	Con Mariachi	Pepe Aguilar
1999	8	Necesito Decirte	Conjunto Primavera
1999	9	Juan Gabriel Con Banda...El Recodo	Juan Gabriel and Banda el Recodo
1999	10	Contigo	Intocable

Sources: 1990, 1992, 1993, 1994, 1995, 1996, 1997, 1998, 1999,
