= ¿Qué Creías? =

1992 single by Selena

Single by Selena

from the album Entre a Mi Mundo
- A-side: "La Llamada"
- Released: November 1992
- Studio: AMEN Studios (San Antonio, TX)
- Genre: Mariachi
- Length: 3:34
- Label: EMI Latin
- Songwriters: A.B. Quintanilla, Pete Astudillo
- Producer: A.B. Quintanilla

Selena singles chronology
"Como la Flor" (1992)	"¿Qué Creías?" (1992)	"Amame" (1993)

Audio
- "Que Creias" on YouTube

"¿Qué Creías?" ("What Did You Think?") is a song by American singer Selena, taken from her third studio album, Entre a Mi Mundo (1992). It was written by Pete Astudillo and A. B. Quintanilla; the composition was a result of a challenge issued by A. B. to Astudillo to create a song before they arrived in Las Vegas from California. Astudillo drew inspiration from the works of Mexican singer Juan Gabriel, culminating in a mariachi ballad. Selena, in describing the song, avers that it embodies women on a collective scale. It is the singer's torch song and the lyrics elucidate Selena's inflexible stance on refusing to absolve an unfaithful partner. She directly addresses her former lover who had taken her for granted, informing him of her capability to exist without him. Critics acclaimed Selena's emotional vocal range and her poetic expression with a distinctly feminine cadence.

"¿Qué Creías?" peaked at number 14 on the US Billboard Hot Latin Songs chart, and has since been certified gold (Latin) by the Recording Industry Association of America (RIAA). During Selena's live performances of the song, she frequently selected a male volunteer to portray her former lover on stage, allowing her to express her indignation as the wronged partner. This was dramatized by Christian Serratos in the Netflix two-part limited drama Selena: The Series (2020). Alicia Villareal performed the song during the benefit concert Selena ¡VIVE! (2005).

== Background and production ==
In a moment of creative spontaneity, Pete Astudillo, the backup vocalist, and A. B. Quintanilla, Selena's brother and producer, wrote "¿Qué Creías?" in the backseat of a car. Oftentimes, their tour bus broke down, rendering the crew to travel long distances in three vehicles. The songwriting process, sparked by A. B.'s challenge to Astudillo, occurred during one such journey from California to Las Vegas, a frequent stop by the group's manager Abraham Quintanilla whenever traveling back from California. Astudillo's source of inspiration was the Mexican singer Juan Gabriel, and he crafted a ballad intended to showcase Selena's vocal prowess expressing his desire to create a song that the singer could "really sink her teeth into and really let it roar". Upon arrival in Las Vegas, Astudillo had written two verses. Selena recorded the song quickly, according to the recollections of the group's guitarist, Chris Perez.

== Music and lyrics ==
Musically, "¿Qué Creías?" is a mariachi ballad and a torch song. It draws influences from historical boleros of northern Mexico, conjunto (small band) styles, ranchera, and Andalusian copla which showcases the historical and cultural connections to Spain. The song is a Latino-version of the blues, according to biographer Veda Boyd Jones. "¿Qué Creías?" includes seven major chords and a stretched instrumentation in its song structure. Tejano singer David Lee Garza lent his "soulful" accordion-style on the track. Lyrically, Selena portrays herself as a wronged woman, fiercely confronting her lover and reminding female listeners of how men often take them for granted. At the beginning of the song, Selena insists that her former lover leaves and clarifies that he would be mistaken if he believes that she would forgive him for his wrongdoing, as she can live without him. According to Selena's biographer Joe Nick Patoski, Selena "scorches" her former lover who took her for granted. Selena's "lack of restraint" emotive vocal range and lyrics echo the "gritty passion" of Lucha Villa, showcasing her as a "dramatic ballad singer".

== Reception ==
Elsa Nidia Barrett of the Tucson Citizen was moved by the lyrics of "¿Qué Creías?" and specifically praised Selena's ability to confront a cheating partner "with such aplomb". Similarly, Richard Torres of Newsday commended Selena's emotive delivery in songs like "¿Qué Creías?" and "Tú, Sólo Tú" (1995), which he believed was key to their success as hit singles. He praised the "extra throb in [Selena's] throat" as "truly heartrending". Musicologist and author John Storm Roberts felt that "¿Qué Creías?" lacked the "thousand octane and ten-Kleenex passion of a Lola Beltrán". However, he acknowledged the song's strong emotionalism and Mexican "pop-ranchera" style. Roberts emphasized that his criticism did not diminish Selena's talent and star quality. Elijah Wald of The New York Times regarded "¿Qué Creías?" as evidence that Selena was able to dig deep and express herself in a personal way. Wald found her delivery of the song to be akin to that of a "ferocious passion of a classic Mexican diva". "¿Qué Creías?" is a "kiss-off anthem", that Selena said speaks "for all the ladies". Patoski described the track as "all sass and fire", and noted its departure from Selena's usual cumbia style. In his review for the Lakeland Ledger, Steve Webb observed that the song showcased Selena's ambition to expand her musical range.

In a music report for New York, "¿Qué Creías?" was the fourth most-played song in the state. It received extensive airplay in various locations, including Austin and Houston. It was the eighth most-played song on Tejano radio stations in Texas. The song was especially popular among fans in Mexico. "¿Qué Creías?" entered at number 38 on the US Billboard Hot Latin Songs chart on the week ending November 28, 1992. It peaked at number 14 on the issue dated February 6, 1993. "¿Qué Creías?" debuted and peaked at number 10 on the US Billboard Latin Digital Song Sales chart on the tracking week of December 16, 2020. The song was certified gold (Latin) in 2017 by the Recording Industry Association of America (RIAA), which denotes 30,000 units consisted of sales and on-demand streaming in the United States.

== Promotion and media appearances ==
During the aftershow of the 1993 Tejano Music Awards in March, Selena discussed preparations for filming a music video for "¿Qué Creías?" in Nuevo Leon. In September 1992, EMI Latin organized a press conference in Monterrey, Mexico, in a bid to capitalize on the growing popularity of "¿Qué Creías?" and Entre a Mi Mundo, which marked Selena's first album to appeal to Mexican audiences. During live performances of "¿Qué Creías?", Selena often sought out a male volunteer from the audience to portray her ex-boyfriend and rebuke him as she depicted the role of a wronged woman. Gus Garcia of the Del Rio News-Herald praised A. B.'s songwriting, which deals with real-life situations, and Selena's ability to communicate the message of "¿Qué Creías?" through her performances. Tejano music columnist for the Corpus Christi Caller-Times, writer Rene Cabrera reported that during a 1993 concert at the Houston Astrodome, fans of the singer cheered loudly when she performed the song; which drew a record-breaking audience of 57,894. Wald described Selena's performances of the song as a "tribute to tradition while comically asserting her independence from it". One of Selena's 1994 performances of "¿Qué Creías?" on the Johnny Canales Show during which Canales played her ex-lover, was later included in the host's DVD compilation of "favorite songs".

In 2005, Alicia Villarreal performed the song at the Selena ¡VIVE! benefit concert. In 2020, Christian Serratos portrayed Selena in the Netflix two-part limited drama Selena: The Series. Serratos cited the concert scene of "¿Qué Creías?" as her favorite part because of Selena's unique ability to make her concertgoers feel as if "they were all hanging out together as friends". In preparation, Serratos re-watched Selena's performances of the song, and described one in particular as "just so badass" because of Selena's unbridled confidence.

== Credits and personnel ==
Credits are adapted from the liner notes of Entre a Mi Mundo.

- Selena – vocals
- A.B. Quintanilla – producer, songwriter, programming, arranger, mixing
- Pete Astudillo – songwriter
- Brian "Red" Moore – engineer, mix engineer
- Ricky Vela – keyboards
- Joe Ojeda – keyboards
- David Lee Garza – accordion

== Charts and certification ==
=== Weekly charts ===
Weekly chart performance for "¿Qué Creías?"
Chart (1993)	Peak position
US Hot Latin Songs (Billboard)	14

=== Certification ===
Certifications and sales for "¿Qué Creías?"
Region	Certification	Certified units/sales
United States (RIAA)	Gold (Latin)	30,000^{‡}
^{‡} Sales+streaming figures based on certification alone.

== Sources ==
- "RIAA Gold & Platinum > Selena > Que Creias". RIAA.
- Anon. (November 28, 1992a). "Hot Latin Songs > November 28, 1992". Billboard. Vol. 104, no. 48. p. 36. ISSN 0006-2510.
- Anon. (November 26, 1992f). "Top Tejano Singles > November 26, 1992". Austin American-Statesman – via Newspapers.com.
- Anon. (February 6, 1993e). "Hot Latin Songs > February 6, 1993" (PDF). Billboard. Vol. 105, no. 4. p. 47. ISSN 0006-2510.
- Alford, Steven (February 5, 2015). "New Selena DVD showcases rare television performance footage". Corpus Christi Caller-Times. Archived from the original on March 4, 2016.
- Barrett, Elsa Nidia (March 24, 2005). "Selena: one of us: Mexican-Americans admired the Texas singer". Tucson Citizen. ProQuest 237146234.
- Browne, John (August 18, 1995). "From the EW archives: Born Again: Selena's star is still rising". Entertainment Weekly.
- Bustios, Pamela (December 16, 2020). "Selena Returns to Latin Pop Albums Chart With 'Selena: The Series Soundtrack'" (PDF). Billboard Pro.
- Cabrera, Rene (July 24, 1992). "Selena, Mazz plan concerts here". Corpus Christi Caller-Times – via Newspapers.com.
- Cabrera, Rene (March 5, 1993). "Selena, David Lee Draw Crowd in Houston". Corpus Christi Caller-Times – via Newspapers.com.
- De la Torre, Chito (February 18, 1994). "Behind the scenes with AB Quintanilla". La Prensa de San Antonio. ProQuest 368510204.
- Garcia, Gus (July 26, 1993). "Selena, Sonny wow crowd". Del Rio News-Herald – via Newspapers.com.
- Guerra, Joey (November 1, 2017). "The stories behind Selena's legacy and biggest hits". Houston Chronicle.
- Jaklewicz, Greg (August 28, 1992). "Live with Garth, Selina's (sic) here; music coming to fair". Abilene Reporter-News – via Newspapers.com.
- Jones, Veda Boyd (2013). Selena. Infobase Learning. ISBN 9781438146379.
- Mendoza, Madalyn (February 23, 2018). "Rare Selena Photos: Queen of Tejano's 'Que Creías' serenade enchants Twitter". San Antonio Express-News.
- Patoski, Joe Nick (1996). Selena: Como La Flor. Boston: Little Brown and Company. ISBN 0-316-69378-2.
- Patoski, Joe Nick (2006). Texas monthly on Texas women (1st ed.). Austin, Texas: University of Texas Press. p. 229. ISBN 0292713274.
- Quintanilla, Selena (1992). Entre a Mi Mundo (Media notes). A.B. Quintanilla (producer), Suzette Quintanilla (spoken liner notes producer). EMI Latin.
- Roberts, John Storm (1999). The Latin Tinge (2nd ed.). Oxford University Press. p. 304. ISBN 9780190283841.
- Roiz, Jessica (April 13, 2020). "Selena Quintanilla Songs To Heal a Broken Heart". Billboard.
- Ruiz, Paula (January 2, 2005). "Haran disco a Selena". Grupo Reforma. ProQuest 373817429.
- Sanderson, Sertan (October 12, 2020). "Netflix honors Selena – and the German origins of Tejano". DW.
- San Miguel Jr, Guadalupe (2002). Tejano proud : Tex-Mex music in the twentieth century (1st ed.). College Station, Texas: Texas A&M University Press. p. 208. ISBN 1585441880.
- Salazar, Gene (April 30, 1995). "Fiesta '95 Dedicated to Selena". The Victoria Advocate.
- Selena (March 14, 1993). "1993 Tejano Music Awards Aftershow". Texas Talent Association (Interview). Interviewed by Jesus Soltero. San Antonio, Texas: Orale Primo Television.
- Torres, Richard (May 2, 1999). "Latin Sounds / The Best of Selena Lives On". Newsday. ProQuest 279217727.
- Walsh, Savannah (December 4, 2020a). "See The Cast Of Netflix's Selena: The Series Vs. The People They Play In Real Life". Elle.
- Walsh, Savannah (December 30, 2020b). "Is Christian Serratos Really Singing in 'Selena: The Series'?". Elle.
- Webb, Steve (February 17, 1995). "A Force in Change of Cumbia Tejano". The Ledger.
- Wald, Elijah (December 3, 2020). "Selena's Special Genius". The New York Times.
