= Ámame (song) =

Single by Selena

from the album Entre a Mi Mundo
- Released: April 1993
- Studio: AMEN Studios (San Antonio, TX)
- Genre: Dance pop, disco
- Length: 3:38
- Label: EMI Latin
- Songwriters: Selena, Pete Astudillo
- Producer: A. B. Quintanilla

Selena singles chronology
| "¿Qué Creías?" (1992) | "Ámame" (1993) | "No Debes Jugar" (1993) |

"Ámame" ("Love Me") is a song by American singer Selena, taken from her third studio album, Entre a Mi Mundo (1992). Selena and Chris Pérez began secretly dating subsequent to Pérez's reintegration into Selena y Los Dinos in the summer of 1991, despite her father's objections. The song was written by Selena and conveys her sentiments towards Pérez as they concealed their liaison from familial scrutiny. Pete Astudillo contributed to the lyrical development of the composition, while A. B. Quintanilla handled production. It was released as the fourth and final single from the album in April 1993.

"Ámame" is a dance-pop and disco song, inspired by Selena and A. B.'s desire to record pop music compositions, accompanied by lyrics delineating a woman's longing for reciprocated affection from her lover. It received a positive response from music critics who lauded Selena's resonant vocals and acknowledged the dance-pop influences. The song peaked at number 27 on the US Billboard Hot Latin Songs chart. Selena's creative process for the song was portrayed by Christian Serratos in the Netflix two-part limited drama, Selena: The Series (2020).

== Background and release ==
In 1988, Chris Pérez replaced Roger Garcia as the guitarist of Selena y Los Dinos. Pérez developed an admiration for the ensemble subsequent to experiencing their album Preciosa (1988), becoming particularly enamored with A. B. Quintanilla's musical production. Pérez elected to join Selena y Los Dinos, and abandoned his recently formed rock band. In 1990, Pérez temporarily departed the group, leading to Joe Ortega's recruitment. However, upon his wife's insistence, Ortega relinquished his position after their marriage, resulting in Pérez's return to the ensemble in the summer of 1991.

Pérez began dating lead singer Selena in secret, despite her father's objections. In reaction to her emotions for Pérez and their concealed relationship, Selena composed "Ámame" and sought lyrical assistance from backup dancer and singer Pete Astudillo. Contrary to a 1996 article by biographer Joe Nick Patoski in the Austin American-Statesman, "Ámame" was not Selena's inaugural songwriting credit; she had previously authored "My Love" for her debut studio album with EMI Latin, Selena (1989).

Abraham Quintanilla, Selena's father and manager, recounted the singer's dedication to recording the song as Selena "poured every ounce of energy" into it. A. B. produced the track for the group's third studio album, Entre a Mi Mundo (1992), which Abraham described as embodying one of Selena and A. B.'s "pop inclinations". The song was released as the fourth and final single from Entre a Mi Mundo in April 1993. Vilma Maldonado, writing for The Monitor, reminisced about the song permeating radio stations throughout Texas.

== Music, lyrics, and reception ==
"Ámame" (1992)
"Ámame" is a disco dance-pop song showcasing Selena's "rich, throaty vocals", which revealed a distinct facet of the artist.

Suzette Fernandez for Billboard magazine, characterized "Ámame" as a disco song track encompassing lyrics expressing a woman's longing for reciprocated affection from her lover. Jessica Roiz, also from Billboard, deemed Selena's live rendition of "Ámame" on Telemundo's music show Club Telemundo in 1993 among her most exceptional televised performances. Writing for the Houston Chronicle, Joey Guerra described the song as dance-pop, showcasing Selena's "rich, throaty vocals", which revealed a distinct facet of the artist. After a string of musicians covered songs by Selena at their RodeoHouston concerts, Guerra proposed that Brendon Urie of Panic! At the Disco, slated for an upcoming performance at the venue, could interpret "Ámame". Guerra contended that Urie could infuse the "dance-pop anthem" suggesting that his vocals and the track's production could elevate it "into the heavens".

Upon its radio release, "Ámame" debuted at number nine on the indie Tejano Singles chart for Texas on the week ending April 8, 1993. It debuted at number 40 on the US Billboard Hot Latin Songs chart on the week ending April 24, 1993. "Ámame" peaked at number 27 on the Hot Latin Songs chart in the week ending May 22, 1993. The recording was the third-highest charting Tejano single on the Hot Latin Songs chart for the week, following La Mafia's chart-topper "Me Estoy Enamorado" and Mazz "¿Qué Será?" at number 17.

The Netflix's two-part limited drama Selena: The Series (2020–21), portrayed the creation of "Ámame", with Christian Serratos depicting Selena opposite Jesse Posey as Pérez. In the ninth episode of the series' first part, Abraham rehires a bodyguard in response to a fan's aggressive physical approach during a live performance. Selena reacts by punching the concertgoer in order to set herself free from him. Because of the proximity of her bodyguard, Selena deliberately avoids Pérez, fearing the guard might disclose their relationship to her father. This avoidance distresses Pérez, leading him to suspect their romance has concluded. After Pérez confronts Selena, she pens her sentiments regarding their relationship, requesting Astudillo (Julio Macias) to transform "Ámame" ("Love Me") into a song. Following Selena's live performance, Pérez responds with "I do, te amo (love you)".

== Credits and personnel ==
Credits are adapted from the liner notes of Entre a Mi Mundo.

- Selena – vocals, songwriter
- A. B. Quintanilla – producer, arranger, mixing
- Pete Astudillo – songwriter
- Brian "Red" Moore – engineer, mix engineer
- Ricky Vela – keyboards
- Joe Ojeda – keyboards
- Chris Pérez – guitar
- Suzette Quintanilla – drums

== Chart performance ==
Weekly chart performance for "Ámame"
| Chart (1993) | Peak position |
|---|---|
| US Hot Latin Songs (Billboard) | 27 |

== Works cited ==
- Guerra, Joey (February 27, 2019). "From Cardi to Kane to George: Which Selena song should each RodeoHouston performer cover?". Houston Chronicle.
- Guerra, Joey (March 27, 2020). "These 24 Selena songs don't get played enough". Houston Chronicle.
- Quintanilla, Selena (1992). Entre a Mi Mundo (Media notes). A. B. Quintanilla (producer), Suzette Quintanilla (spoken liner notes producer). EMI Latin.
- Barrientos, Selena (May 3, 2021). "The Cast of Netflix's 'Selena' Looks Just Like Their Real-Life Counterparts". Good Housekeeping.
- Robles, Henry (December 4, 2020). "¿Qué Creías?". Selena: The Series. Series 1. Episode 9 (in English and Spanish). Netflix.
- Roiz, Jessica (August 9, 2018). "Watch Selena Quintanilla's Top 7 TV Performances". Billboard.
- Fernandez, Suzette (March 30, 2020). "All Selena Quintanilla's Hot Latin Songs Hits". Billboard.
- Patoski, Joe Nick (March 26, 1996). "Selena Finds Love, Independence". Austin American-Statesman – via Newspapers.com.
- Quintanilla, Selena (1989). Selena (Media notes). A. B. Quintanilla (producer), Suzette Quintanilla (spoken liner notes producer). EMI Latin. 724354099403.
- Maldonado, Vilma (April 15, 1994). "When Hard Work Pays Off, Why Do Crowds Boo?". The Monitor – via Newspapers.com.
- Cabrera, Rene (May 21, 1993). "Tejano Acts Moving Up the Billboard Charts". Corpus Christi Caller-Times – via Newspapers.com.
- "On the Charts > April 8, 1993". Austin-American Statesman. April 8, 1993 – via Newspapers.com.
- Lannert, John (April 24, 1993). "Hot Latin Songs > April 24, 1993" (PDF). Billboard. Vol. 105, no. 17. p. 92.
- Lannert, John (May 22, 1993). "Hot Latin Songs > May 22, 1993". Billboard. Vol. 105, no. 22. p. 131.
- Pérez, Chris (2012). To Selena, with Love. Penguin Books. ISBN 9780451414045.
- Patoski, Joe Nick (1996). Selena: Como La Flor. Boston: Little, Brown and Company. ISBN 0-316-69378-2.
- Quintanilla, Selena (1998). Anthology (Media notes). Abraham Quintanilla (written biography). EMI Latin. 7243494110.
