= Del Rio News-Herald =

Newspaper published in Del Rio, Texas, U.S. (1884-2020)

- Type: Daily newspaper
- Format: Broadsheet
- Owner: Southern Newspapers Inc.
- Publisher: David Rupkalvis
- Editor: Ruben Cantu
- Founded: 1884
- Ceased publication: November 18, 2020
- Headquarters: Del Rio, Texas, USA
- Circulation: 10,400
- Website: Del Rio News-Herald

The Del Rio News-Herald was a newspaper published in Del Rio, Texas, covering Val Verde County. The publication's origins date back to 1884, but the paper took on its current name after a consolidation of two separate titles in 1929. It was owned by Southern Newspapers Inc. and published Tuesday through Friday afternoons and on Sunday morning. Its final issue was published on November 18, 2020. At the time, the newspaper had a daily circulation of 10,400 and a Sunday circulation of 13,500 newspapers. The chief reporter for the paper was Karen Gleason.
