= Ludwig Chodziesner =

- Born: August 28, 1861; Obrzycko, Province of Posen, Prussia
- Died: February 13, 1943 (aged 81); Theresienstadt concentration camp, Protectorate of Bohemia and Moravia
- Education: Wągrowiec High School; Berlin University (Law)
- Occupation: Criminal defense lawyer
- Years active: 1891–1936

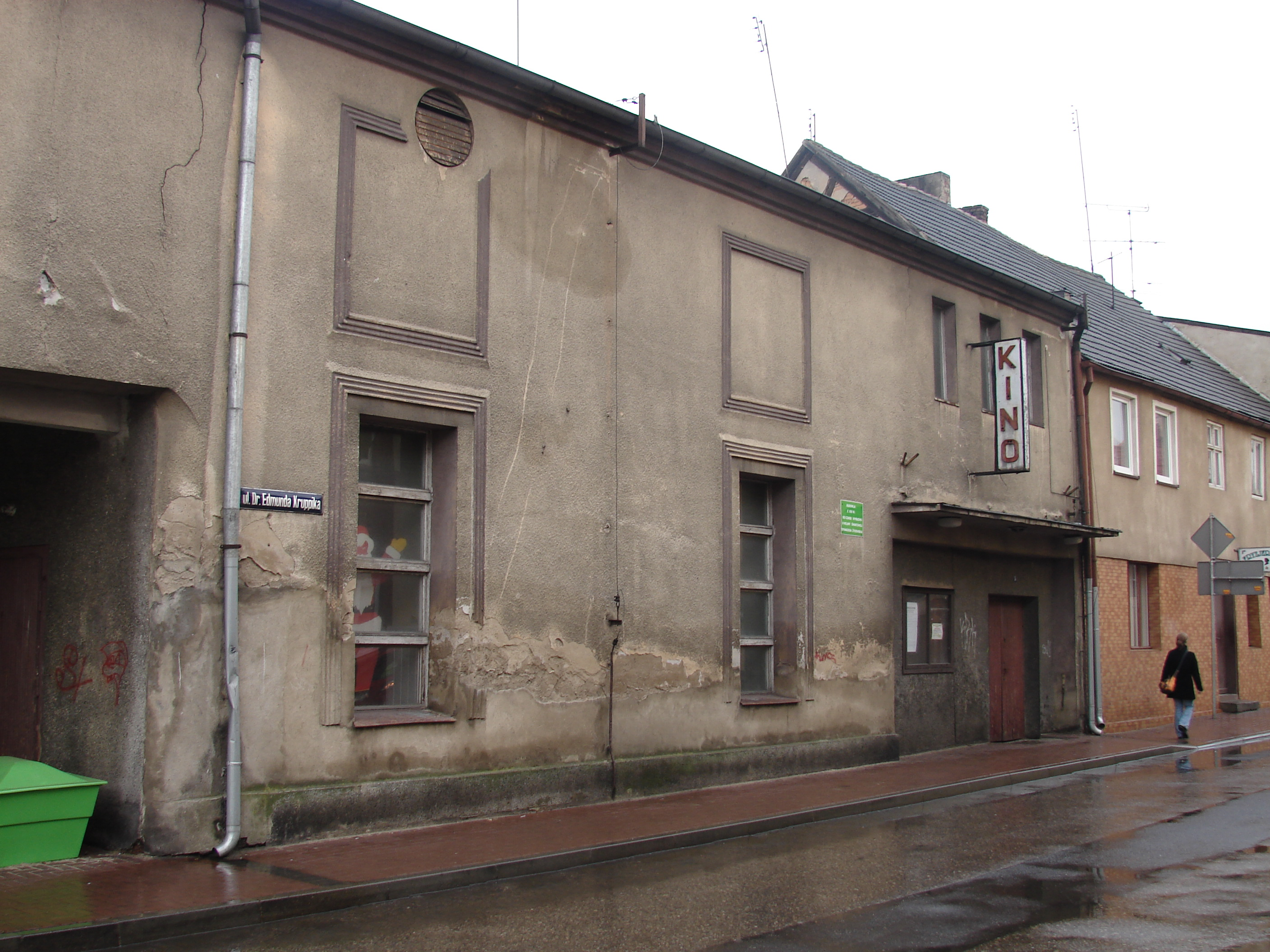
The former synagogue in Obrzycko, Poland, the birthplace of Ludwig Israel Chodziesner.

Ludwig Chodziesner (28 August 1861 – 13 February 1943) was a German criminal defense lawyer and father of German poet Gertrud Kolmar.

== Family roots and early life ==
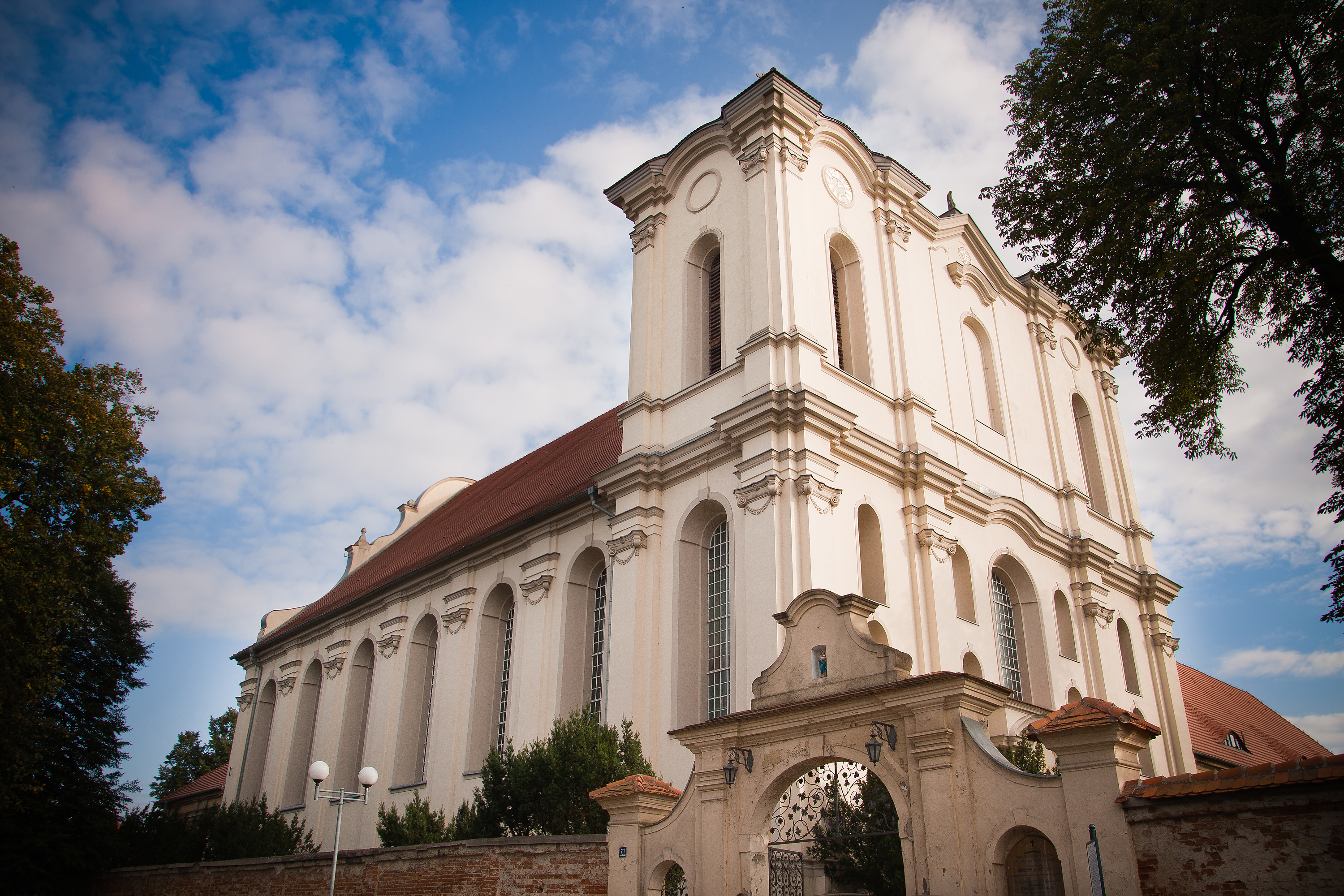
A view of the former monastic church in the Wągrowiec Abbey, of which Chodziesner said: “The school premises were located in the Cistercian monastery, where the district court was also located. Next to it, there was a monastery church with a patio. The whole thing, surrounded by a high wall, made a romantic impression on me, although I had no inclination to do so.

Ludwig's surname, Chodziesner, traces the family back to Chodzież, Poland. His Jewish ancestors had been connected to the vicinity of Greater Poland for generations, among them family members living in Rogoźno where his father Julius was born, and Mieścisko, the birthplace of his mother Johanna.

Ludwig Chodziesner was born in 1861 in Obrzycko, while his brothers Max and Siegfried were born in Dobiegniew nearly a decade later. This region had been annexed by Prussia during the Partitions of Poland in the late 17th century as South Prussia, which later became the Province of Posen. Ludwig spent all of his life in Greater Poland prior to his studies in Berlin Their parents were simple folk, with their father working as a door-to-door salesman who saved money to educate his sons. Ludwig attended high school along with his brothers Siegfried and Max in Wągrowiec where their mother's sister lived. This was an elite high school, counting among its alumni noted literati Carl Hermann Busse and Stanisław Przybyszewski.

Years later, the oldest Chodziesner recalled this period in Wągrowiec as follows: “I lived in this town for seven years. Here I have turned from a boy to a young man and from a young man to a man. (...) here I wrote my first poems, here I got to know the world of the Hellenes and the wealth of German writers and thinkers. The school premises were located in the Cistercian monastery, where the district court was also located. Next to it, there was a monastery church with a patio. The whole thing, surrounded by a high wall, made a romantic impression on me, although I had no inclination to do so."

== Career and death ==
After finishing high school in Wągrowiec, Ludwig Chodziesner left for Berlin, where he completed his law studies. Chodziesner ran a law firm with the influential attorney-at-law Max Wronker. Over time, he became a true star of the Berlin Bar and participated in some of the most notorious trials of the era of the late German Empire and the Weimar Republic. Chodziesner fought in court on behalf of the son of Countess Izabela Kwilecka regarding his right to inherit the family fortune, and conducted the divorce case of the future German ambassador to the Soviet Union, Count Friedrich-Werner Graf von der Schulenburg. Ludwig Chodziesner also defended Count Eulenburg, a close friend of Emperor Wilhelm II, who was charged with homosexuality in the Harden–Eulenburg affair.

In Berlin, Ludwig married Elise Schoenflies, who was born in Gorzów Wielkopolski. Elise and Ludwig had 3 daughters and a son, among which, their daughter Gertrude Käthe Chodziesner would become known to the world under her literary pseudonym, Gertrud Kolmar.

Ludwig had long identified as a German, so he was severely depressed after Adolf Hitler's rise to power. The removal of Ludwig in 1936, after forty-five years of practice, from the list of attorneys (tantamount to a ban on practicing his profession) as well as forcing him to sell their impressive home in the trendy Berlin-Westend struck him particularly hard. In 1939 he wrote in a letter to his younger daughter Hilde Wenzel: "On Friday evening I was in a synagogue for the first time in sixty years." After the forced relocation and the accommodation of tenants, he lived with his daughter, Gertrud Kolmar, in one room. He tried to appear normal, but this became harder over time. In September 1942, he was deported to Theresienstadt concentration camp in the Protectorate of Bohemia and Moravia, where he died on 13 February 1943. His daughter Gertrud outlived him by less than a month.

Ludwig's brother Siegfried Chodziesner was more fortunate; after the events of Kristallnacht, he emigrated with his family, via Italy, to Uruguay, where he died in 1948. While he lived in Berlin, Siegfried was not only a successful lawyer, but also a social activist, thanks to his membership on the board of Magnus Hirschfeld's Institut für Sexualwissenschaft as well as being a defender of gay rights. Siegfried was also active in the Scientific-Humanitarian Committee, where he collaborated with another countryman from Wągrowiec, doctor Max Tischler. Ludwig's other brother, lawyer Max Chodziesner, who in 1931 was included in the list of the sixty greatest Jewish personalities of Berlin which included Alfred Döblin, Lion Feuchtwanger and Albert Einstein, also survived the Holocaust by emigrating to South America.
