= Peter Sühring =

German musicologist

Peter Sühring (born 1946) is a German musicologist, publicist and music critic.

== Life and career ==
Sühring was born and raised in Berlin-Charlottenburg. He was a choirboy in the Staats- und Domchor Berlin and learned to play the cello and piano. He studied musicology, literary studies and philosophy in Tübingen and Berlin from 1967 to 1971 and from 2001 to 2002. He adhered to the "Great Refusal" recommended by Alfred North Whitehead, Virginia Woolf, Simone Weil, and Herbert Marcuse, the "primary characteristic of a critique based on ideals of untrue statements about reality" (Whitehead 1926) and took leave of the bourgeoisie. As part of the movement "West Berliner Kinderläden", he edited the unauthorized first publication and commentary on Walter Benjamin's writings on children's theater and children's education. From 1972 to 1981, he worked in print shops and publishing houses, and as a works council member in the book wholesale trade. From 1981 to 1997, he worked in Tübingen (in the bookstore Gastl) and in 1997/98 in Berlin as a scientific assortment manager (for philosophy, philology and social sciences), bookseller examination in 1985. He entered into historical music research with Elisabeth Musiquen (Academy for Historical Performance Practice Berlin) in 1999–2002. Today he lives and works as a music historian and publicist in Bornheim and Berlin.

In 2002, he wrote his master's thesis on the rhythm of the trobadors at the Humboldt University of Berlin. In 2004, he prepared a catalog of the Berlin and Łódźs holdings of Philipp Spitta's library for the Berlin University of the Arts Library, sponsored by the Ernst von Siemens Music Foundation. In 2006, he received his doctorate from Saarland University with a thesis on Wolfgang Amadeus Mozart's childhood operas. He conducted research on the German musicologist Gustav Jacobsthal from 2007 to 2009 as a fellow of the German Research Foundation (DFG) and from 2009 to 2012 as a research fellow of the Berlin University of the Arts, publishing a selection edition of his estate in 2010 and a scholarly biography of him in 2012. He also edited other previously unpublished writings by Gustav Jacobsthal. One focus of his work is Judaism in philosophy, music and literature.

He also published on the composers, musicologists, philosophers and writers Jean-Philippe Rameau, Wolfgang Amadeus Mozart, Felix Mendelssohn Bartholdy, Robert Schumann, Anton Reicha, Jean-Jacques Rousseau, Johann Wolfgang von Goethe, Heinrich Heine, Friedrich Hölderlin, Adelbert von Chamisso, Gertrud Kolmar, Karl Marx, Eduard Grell, Adolf Bernhard Marx, Theodor Hagen, Philipp Spitta, Hermann Kretzschmar, Leo Blech, Ferenc Fricsay und Giuseppe Verdi.

Since 1995, he has also worked as a music critic. His reviews were initially published mainly in daily newspapers, and in recent years increasingly in online media, such as info-netz-musik. Sühring is among others since 1999 a permanent freelancer for the magazine Concerto - Das Magazin für Alte Musik, as well as at Forum Musikbibliothek.

He works as an indexer of older German-language music journals for the Répertoire internationale de la presse musicale (RIPM), Baltimore/USA, since 2012.

He advocates a unified, inherently multidimensional musicology and a conception of music history beyond epochal divisions and normative aesthetics. Instead, he strives for a musical poetics of the individual musical artist and a hermeneutics of the individual musical work of art, whose meaning usually lies buried under cultural discourses.

== Publications (selection) ==
=== Books ===
- Der Rhythmus der Trobadors – Zur Archäologie einer Interpretationsgeschichte, Logos, Berlin 2003, ISBN 3-8325-0367-6
- with Krystyna Bielska: Katalog der Sammlung Spitta. Published by the Universität der Künste Berlin and the Bibliothek der Universität Łódź. Inventory vol. 3, Berlin 2005 (Schriften aus dem Archiv der Universität der Künste Berlin).
- Die frühesten Opern Mozarts. Untersuchungen im Anschluss an Jacobsthals Straßburger Vorlesungen, Bärenreiter, Kassel 2006, ISBN 978-3-7618-1895-4 (alaso a dissertation at the University of Saarbrücken 2006).
- Gustav Jacobsthal – ein Musikologe im deutschen Kaiserreich. Musik inmitten von Natur, Geschichte und Sprache. Eine ideen- und kulturgeschichtliche Biografie mit Briefen und Dokumenten, Olms-Verlag, Hildesheim 2012. Inhaltsverzeichnis: Deutsche Nationalbibliothek, retrieved 13 March 2021
- Gustav Jacobsthal: Glück und Misere eines Musikforschers Centrum Judaicum, Verlag Hentrich & Hentrich, Berlin 2014, ISBN 978-3-95565-042-1 (Jüdische Miniaturen. Vol. 149).
- Felix Mendelssohn. Der (un)vollendete Tonkünstler, Hentrich & Hentrich, Berlin 2018, ISBN 978-3-95565-285-2 (Jüdische Miniaturen, vol. 227,)
- Ferenc Fricsay. Der Dirigent als Musiker. edition text + kritik, Reihe SOLO, München 2023, ISBN 978-3-96707-815-2 (Verlagsmitteilung etk-muenchen.de; retrieved 9 May 2023).
- Der frühe Mozart – ein komponierendes Kind zwischen Nachahmung und Kreation. Untersuchungen einiger frühester Werke W. A. Mozarts mit forschungs- und editionskritischen Bemerkungen. musiconn.publish, Dresden 2024, doi:10.25366/2024.57.

=== Editor ===
- Gustav Jacobsthal - „Intimste Absichten des Componisten durch allerhand Nebenrücksichten verdunkelt". Bruchstücke aus einer Mozart-Vorlesung (Straßburg im Sommer 1888), aus dem handschriftlichen Nachlaß edited by Peter Sühring, in Programmheft Idomeneo der Salzburger Festspiele und des Festspielhauses Baden-Baden, June 2000, pp. 70–72.
- Gustav Jacobsthal – Die Musiktheorie Hermanns von Reichenau. In Musiktheorie 16 (2001), pp. 3–39. doi:10.25366/2021.03.
- Gustav Jacobsthal – Vorläufige Gedanken zur Verbesserung der musikalischen Zustände an den preußischen Universitäten. Memorandum an das preußische Kultusministerium 1883, sowie die Gutachten von Philipp Spitta und Heinrich Bellermann. In Jahrbuch des Staatlichen Instituts für Musikforschung Berlin, Preußischer Kulturbesitz, Stuttgart 2002, pp. 295–322. Together with an editorial preface and a commentary on the history of ideas and music education by the editor, also available online: musiconn.publish, retrieved 13 March 2021
- Gustav Jacobsthal – Übergänge und Umwege in der Musikgeschichte. Aus Straßburger Vorlesungen und Studien, Codex Montpellier, Palestrina, Monteverdi, Haydn, Emanuel Bach, Mozart, Olms-Verlag, Hildesheim 2010. Inhaltsverzeichnis: Deutsche Nationalbibliothek, retrieved 13 March 2021
- Gustav Jacobsthal - Der Codex Montpellier. Beschreibung und Untersuchung, only online: musiconn.publish, retrieved 13 March 2021
- Gustav Jacobsthal - Die Opern aus Mozarts Kindheit. Vorlesungsskizzen, Straßburg 1888, only online: musiconn.publish, retrieved 13 March 2021
- Gustav Jacobsthal - Schwierige Lieder – das „Spörl Liederbuch". Notizen zur Mondsee-Wiener Liederhandschrift des Mönchs von Salzburg (Wien, NB Cod. 2856). Herausgegeben (transkribiert, redigiert und kommentiert) von Peter Sühring, nur online: doi:10.25366/2025.262

=== Articles on the Internet ===
- Gustav Jacobsthal's Mozart reception. Mozart in Context: Special issue of Min-Ad: Israel Studies in Musicology Online, Vol. 6/II, December, 2006, retrieved 13 March 2021. And Sammlung Literatur zur Musik der Elektronischen Dokumente der UB Frankfurt/Main, retrieved 13 March 2021.
- Robespierre, Chodziesner, Benjamin, Wenzel: Personenkonstellationen um Gertrud Kolmar. Engführungen des Familiären, Poetischen, Politischen und Religiösen. Brouillon. Magazin der Unterhaltung und des Wissens, retrieved 13 March 2021.
- Wider das Erlösungssyndrom. Bemerkungen zu den Ursachen einer neudeutschen Judenfeindschaft von links. Brouillon. Magazin der Unterhaltung und des Wissens, retrieved 13 March 2021.
- Natur und Zivilisation in der Musik. Theodor Hagen, Marx und Goethe. Ein ideengeschichtliches Tableau musiconn.publish, retrieved 13 March 2021.

=== Essays and papers in print media and in the internet ===
About Wolfgang Amadé Mozart:

- Über den „ganz sonderbaren goût" eines Adagios aus Mozarts opus I, komponiert in Paris 1764. In: Concerto. Das Magazin für Alte Musik, No. 181, March 2003, S. 23–26.
- Eine vierhändige Sonate – „bis dahin noch nirgends gemacht"? Mit einem Anhang zu KV 19d. In: Mozart Studien, Bd. 13, Tutzing 2004, pp. 209–229.
- Ein Künstler im Kindesalter und sein väterlicher Erzieher. Über Wolfgang und Leopold Mozart. In Concerto. Das Magazin für Alte Musik 22 (2006), No. 206 and 208, February and June 2006.
- Der Künstler im Knaben Mozart. In Musik & Ästhetik 10 (2006), No. 39, July 2006, pp. 5–19.
- Musik, die den Handlungen, Situationen und Stimmungen folgt. Über Dramatik und Tonsatz in den ersten Bühnenversuchen Mozarts, Salzburg/Wien 1767/68. In Mozart-Jahrbuch 2006, Kassel 2008, pp. 209–221. Online: Sammlung Literatur zur Musik der Elektronischen Dokumente der UB Frankfurt, retrieved 13 March 2021.
- Sowohl ad libitum als auch obligat begleitend. Der Violinpart in Mozarts begleiteten Clavecin-Sonaten, Paris 1763/64, (KV 6–9). In Mozart Studien XVI, Tutzing 2007, pp. 91–114.
- Bachischer Geist aus Mozarts Händen? Mozarts vier neue Streichtrio-Einleitungen zu vier dreistimmigen Fugen von Johann Sebastian und Wilhelm Friedemann Bach (KV 404a), aus ihrem Kontext heraus erklärt. Vortrag auf dem 6. Dortmunder Bach-Symposium, Juni 2006. In Bach und die deutsche Tradition des Komponierens. Wirklichkeit und Ideologie, edited by Reinmar Emans and Wolfram Steinbeck, Dortmund 2009, pp. 109–121, sowie in acta mozartiana 55 (2008), issue 3/4, pp. 101–110.
- Fragen an Mozarts Idomeneo. Anmerkungen zur Editions- und Aufführungspraxis. In Die Musikforschung 62 (2008), pp. 222–232. Online: Sammlung Literatur zur Musik der Elektronischen Dokumente der UB Frankfurt/Main, retrieved 13 March 2021.
- „Großmutsoper" oder tragische Operette? Zu Mozarts „Fragment" Zaide. In Musik & Ästhetik. Heft 81, January 2017, pp. 76–90. Online: Sammlung Literatur zur Musik der Elektronischen Dokumente der UB Frankfurt/Main, retrieved 13 March 2021, as well as appendix: Ein selbstgezimmertes fensterloses Gehäuse der Mozart-Forschung. Ein Literaturbericht zu Mozarts Zaïde, nur online, DOI: https://doi.org/10.21248/gups.99497].
- Kindlich experimentelles Komponieren wider die Schablonen. Mozarts „Londoner Skizzenbuch“, London und Chelsea, Juli/August 1764 (KV 15a-ss). In: Die Musikforschung 76 (2023), S. 2–20, enthalten in: Der frühe Mozart. (Online).
- Kindlich experimentelles Komponieren wider die Schablonen. Mozarts „Londoner Skizzenbuch", London und Chelsea, Juli/August 1764 (KV 15a-ss). In: Die Musikforschung 76 (2023), S. 2–20, enthalten in: Der frühe Mozart. (Online)

About Felix Mendelssohn:

- Mendelssohns Unbehagen in der Musik. In Concerto. Magazin für Alte Musik. Cologne 2009/10, issue 229, pp. 12–13.
- Interpretationen der sieben Opern Mendelssohns (Soldatenliebschaft, Die beiden Pädagogen, Die wandernden Komödianten, Der Onkel aus Boston, Die Hochzeit des Camacho op.10, Heimkehr aus der Fremde, Die Lorelei). In Felix Mendelssohn Bartholdy. Interpretationen seiner Werke, Laaber 2016.
- Interpretation der Schauspielmusik zur Tragödie des Sophokles Oedipus auf Kolonos. In Felix Mendelssohn Bartholdy. Interpretationen seiner Werke, Laaber 2016.
- Interpretationen mehrerer geistlicher Gesänge für gemischten, Männer- und Frauen-Chor. In Felix Mendelssohn Bartholdy. Interpretationen seiner Werke, Laaber 2016.
- „Einen Text der mich nicht ganz in Feuer setzt componire ich nun einmal nicht". Mendelssohn als verhinderter Opernkomponist. In Concerto. Magazin für Alte Musik. Cologne 2017, issue 273, pp. 24–26 and issue 274, pp. 22–24. Online: Sammlung Literatur zur Musik der Elektronischen Dokumente der UB Frankfurt, retrieved 13 March 2021
- „meine Ideen über die Oper ins Klare und ans Licht bringen". Mendelssohns komponierte und nichtkomponierte Opern. urn:urn:nbn:de:bsz:14-qucosa2-810967:{{{2}}}
- „Übrigens gefall ich mir prächtig hier". Felix Mendelssohn in seinen Düsseldorfer Jahren 1833–1835. In: Helmut Rönz, Martin Schlemmer, Maike Schmidt (Hrsg.): „Refugium einer politikfernen Sphäre"? Musik und Gesellschaft im Rheinland des 19. und 20. Jahrhunderts. Köln 2023, S. 21–34 (rheinische-geschichte.lvr.de retrieved 30 January 2025).

About Gustav Jacobsthal:

- Das enträtselte Mittelalter. Gustav Jacobsthal und seine Schicksale. In Concerto. Magazin für Alte Musik, No. 152, April 2000, pp. 16–22.
- Der einzelne Ausdruck mit seiner Gewalt. Eine Beethoven-Kritik Gustav Jacobsthals aus dem Jahre 1889. In Die Musikforschung 55 (2002), pp. 373–385. Auch online verfügbar: musiconn.publish, retrieved 13 March 2021
- Verwirklichung des Humboldtschen Bildungsideals. Gustav Jacobsthal – ein fast vergessener Begründer der neueren deutschen Musikwissenschaft. In Forum Humanwissenschaften, Frankfurter Rundschau, 20 May 2003, p. 11.
- Gustav Jacobsthal als Kritiker der Modaltheorie avant la lettre. Archivalische Studien. In acta musicologica 75 (2003), pp. 137–172.
- Der Nachlaß Gustav Jacobsthals – ein Zimelium in der Musikabteilung der Berliner Staatsbibliothek. Eine Sichtung. In Forum Musikbibliothek 2007/1, pp. 17–27.
- Ein erster Versuch, das historische Instrumentarium in Monterverdis L'Orfeo zu verstehen: Gustav Jacobsthal, Straßburg 1903. In CONCERTO. Das Magazin für Alte Musik, Cologne, issue 219, April/May 2008, pp. 24–27. Online: Sammlung Literatur zur Musik der Elektronischen Dokumente der UB Frankfurt, retrieved 13 March 2021.
- Jacobsthals Stellung in der Mozart-Forschung des 19. Jahrhunderts. In Mozarts Welt und Nachwelt, Mozart-Handbuch, vol. 5, edited by Gernot Gruber und Claudia Maria Knispel, Laaber 2008, pp. 545–552.
- „Lupe und Ohr". Die am Straßburger Institut von 1872 bis 1905 von Gustav Jacobsthal etablierte Wissenschaftskultur und ihre verborgene Vorläuferrolle für historisierende Aufführungen älterer Musik. In: Basler Jahrbuch für historische Musikpraxis 32 (2008), Winterthur 2010, pp. 133–144.
- Calculation and emotion – rationality and imagination in music analysis. Hermann Graßmann and the mathematics of Gustav Jacobsthal's musicology. In: From Past to Future: Grassmann's Work in Context, Grassmann Bicentennial Conference Potsdam/Szczecin September 2009, Basel 2010, pp. 391–400. In German: Rechnen und Empfinden – Rationalität und Phantasie in der Musikanalyse. Über einige von Hermann Graßmann herrührende mathematische Elemente in den Untersuchungsmethoden Gustav Jacobsthals. In MusikTheorie 25 (2011), pp. 235–244.
- Von der Hörigkeit der Instrumente. Eduard Grell und Gustav Jacobsthal. In Jahrbuch des Staatlichen Instituts für Musikforschung Berlin, PK, 2011, Mainz 2011, pp. 105–124.
- Musik als Universitätsfach technisch und wissenschaftlich. Gustav Jacobsthals Konzeption des Faches Musik in seinem Memorandum von 1883. In: Die Musikforschung 65 (2012), pp. 231–253. Zusammen mit Jacobsthals Denkschrift und den Gutachten von Heinrich Bellermann und Philipp Spitta. Auch online verfügbar: musiconn-publish, retrieved 13 March 2021
- „Lehrer, Helfer und wohlmeinendster Freund". Die Arbeitsbeziehung und Freundschaft zwischen dem Germanisten Wilhelm Scherer und dem Musikologen Gustav Jacobsthal zwischen 1872 und 1886. In Geschichte der Germanistik. Mitteilungen vol. 42/42, Göttingen 2012, pp. 87–101.
- Die Macht der Refrains im Codex Montpellier. Verborgene französisch-deutsche Interpretationslinien zwischen Jacobsthal und Rokseth. Mit einem Brief von Heinrich Besseler aus dem Jahr 1934. In Die Musikforschung 72 (2019), pp. 38–52.
- „Schwierige Lieder" – volkssprachlich, binär, zweistimmig. Gustav Jacobsthals Arbeit an der „Mondsee-Wiener"-Liederhandschrift des Mönchs von Salzburg (A-Wn, Cod. 2856). Ein Hinführung. In: Die Musikforschung, 2025, 78, S. 99–115.

About music theory and the history of science:

- „Für die Musikwissenschaft eine der dringendsten und lohnendsten Aufgaben". Hermann Kretzschmar als Wegbereiter der Historischen Aufführungspraxis. Versuch einer Würdigung zum 75. Todestag, zugleich ein Bericht über das 2. Berliner Kretzschmar-Syposium 1999. In Concerto. Magazin für Alte Musik, No. 147, Sept. 1999, pp. 28–30.
- Musik – dämmernde Vermittlerin. Zu Heinrich Heines denkwürdiger Definition. In Musik & Ästhetik 5 (2001), issue 18 April 2001, pp. 5–11.
- Mitmachen und Widerstehen. Zur mißlungenen Doppelstrategie des Friedrich Gennrich im Jahre 1940. In Musikforschung Faschismus Nationalsozialismus, edited by I. v. Foerster, Chr. Hust, Chr.-H. Mahling, Mainz 2001, pp. 405–414.
- Musik und Sprache in Theorien französischer Aufklärer. In Musik & Ästhetik 7 (2003), issue 28 October 2003, pp. 50–69. In Italian: Musica e linguaggio nelle teorie degli illuministi francesi, translated by Simona Montisci. In Musica/Realtà 25 (2004), issue 73 (March 2004), pp. 45–67.
- Alte Musik lesen, hören und spielen. Zu einigen Bemerkungen Philipp Spittas, 110 Jahre nach seinem Tod. In Concerto. Magazin für Alte Musik, No. 196, Sept. 2004, pp. 9f.
- Die Rekonstruktion der Sammlung Spitta. In Jahrbuch des Staatlichen Instituts für Musikforschung PK 2004, Mainz 2005, pp. 307–322.
- Kontrapunktische Kindheit der Musikgeschichte – Adolf Bernhard Marx' geschichtsphilosophische These vom notwendigen Ende des Kontrapunkts nach Bach In Musik-Konzepte Sonderband "Philosophie des Kontrapunkts", Müunich 2010, pp. 48–59.
- Hans Heinrich Eggebrecht und die Musik im Mittelalter. Drei Notate. In Die Tonkunst 8 (2014). No. 2, April 2014, pp. 236–239.
- Kontinuitätsprobleme in der deutschen Musikwissenschaft. Ein Abgesang. In Musikgeschichte in Mittel und Osteuropa. Mitteilungen der internationalen Arbeitsgemeinschaft an der Universität Leipzig, issue 17, Gudrun Schröder Verlag, Leipzig 2016, pp. 133–155. Also available online: musiconn.publish, retrieved 13 March 2021
- „Die in musicis übercivilisirte Sphäre der Welt hat sich taub gemacht". Eduard Grells Kampf für den unbegleiteten Gesang. In Dichten, Singen, Komponieren. Die Zeltersche Liedertafel als kulturgeschichtliches Phänomen (1809–1945), Wehrhahn Verlag, Hannover 2017, pp. 105–120.
- The Origin and the Decline of Wagnerianism, as reflected in the Neue Zeitschrift für Musik (NZfM) and the Die Redenden Künste, Leipziger Konzertsaal (LKS), Vortrag auf dem IAML-Congress, Riga, June 2017, RIPM-Session, (PDF)
- Natur und Zivilisation in der Musik. Theodor Hagen, Marx und Goethe. Ein ideengeschichtliches Tableau. doi:10.25366/2021.04.

Introductions into musical journals:

- Musik als sozialer Akt und die Grenzen der Gemeinschaft. Eine Einführung in die Zeitschrift Musik und Gesellschaft (MGS), 1930/31. In Forum Musikbibliothek 2020/3, pp. 36–44.
- Gefährdete Pioniere der Musikethnologie. Eine Einführung in die Zeitschrift für vergleichende Musikwissenschaft (ZVM), 1933–35. In: Forum Musikbibliothek, 2021/2, S. 13–19 (journals.qucosa.de).
- Zwischen liberaler Debattenkultur und chauvinistischer Verengung. Eine Einführung in die Zeitschrift für Musikwissenschaft (ZfMw), 1918-35. In: Forum Musikbibliothek, 2023/1, S. 8–16. ()
- Wie man eine Musikbibliothek und ihr Jahrbuch zugrunde richtete, aufgezeigt anhand einer Einführung in die Jahrbücher der Musikbibliothek Peters (JMP), 1894–1940. In: Forum Musikbibliothek, 2023/3, S. 14–21. ().
- zusammen mit Alexander Staub, Vom Organ einer libertären Romantik zum neudeutschen Tendenzblatt. Eine Einführung in die „Brendel-Jahre“ der Neuen Zeitschrift für Musik (NZM), 1845-68. In: Forum Musikbibliothek, 2026/2, S. 14–22.

About individual musicians:

- Dichters Schmerzendrang – Musikers Schmerzensklang. Zu „Hör' ich das Liedchen klingen" aus Robert Schumanns Dichterliebe op. 48 (1840), Liederzyklus aus dem Buch der Lieder von Heinrich Heine. In „Das letzte Wort der Kunst". Heinrich Heine zum 200. Geburtstag und Robert Schumann zum 150. Todestag, Düsseldorfer Ausstellungskatalog, Stuttgart/Kassel 2006, pp. 183–191.
- Der gerissene Faden. Schönberg als Gegenstand historischer Aufführungspraxis. Überlegungen nach einer Berliner Tagung.In Concerto. Magazin für Alte Musik, No. 225, April/May 2009, pp. 5f.
- „Das war ich!". Leben und Werk von Leo Blech. In Jutta Lambrecht (ed.): Leo Blech – Komponist, Kapellmeister, Generalmusikdirektor, Hentrich & Hentrich, Berlin 2015, ISBN 978-3-95565-091-9 (Jüdische Miniaturen. Vol. 173), pp. 12–49.
- Anton Reichas Un-Fugen und ihre Folgen. In Concerto. Magazin für Alte Musik, No. 293, September/October 2020, pp. 8–11.
- Der Scherz des Falstaff war nicht sein letztes Wort. Verdis Sakralmusik. In: Benjamin Knysak, Zdravko Blažeković (Hrsg.): Musical History as Seen through Contemporary Eyes: Essays in Honor of H. Robert Cohen. Hollitzer, Wien 2021, S. 321 42; urn:urn:nbn:de:bsz:14-qucosa2-785779:{{{2}}}.

About Cultural Criticism:

- Was vermögen Philosophie, Kunst und Religion inmitten von Natur, Technik und Kapital? Empedokles – Hölderlin – Marx. In Musik & Ästhetik 14 (2010), issue 55, pp. 51–73.
- Robespierre, Chodziesner, Benjamin, Wenzel: Personenkonstellationen um Gertrud Kolmar. Engführungen des Familiären, Poetischen, Politischen und Religiösen. In: Brouillon. Magazin der Unterhaltung und des Wissens (brouillon.art).
- Wider das Erlösungssyndrom. Bemerkungen zu den Ursachen einer neudeutschen Judenfeindschaft von links. In: Brouillon. Magazin der Unterhaltung und des Wissens (brouillon.art retrieved 20 April 2018).
- (Un)Glück des Nichtidentischen und unverhoffte Gelegenheiten. Überlegungen zu den Gedichten des Adelbert von Chamisso. In: Musik & Ästhetik 29 (2025), Heft 116, S. 24–36 (auch online).
