= Kolmar =

Kolmar may refer to:

- the German name for the town of Chodzież in Poland
- the German name for the commune of Colmar in France
- Gertrud Kolmar, a German lyric poet

== See also ==
- Kreis Kolmar in Posen, a "county" in the Prussian province of Posen (1879-1919)
