= Jewish Cemetery in Obrzycko =

Cemetery in Obrzycko, Poland

Coordinates: 52.7060°N 16.5179°E

The Jewish Cemetery in Obrzycko is a cemetery where Jews who lived in the vicinity of Obrzycko were buried in keeping with Jewish tradition. Cemeteries are referred to in several different ways in Hebrew, including beit kevarot (house of sepulchers), beit almin (eternal home) or beit olam [haba], (house of afterlife), the beit chayyim (house of the living) and beit shalom (house of peace).

The cemetery was destroyed by the Germans after the invasion of Poland during World War II. There are currently no headstones on any of the graves.
