= August Koberstein =

German literary historian (1797–1870)

Karl August Koberstein
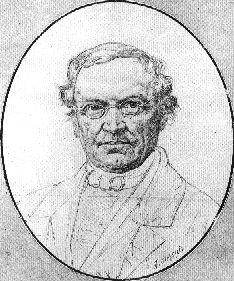
- Born: 10 January 1797; Rügenwalde
- Died: 8 March 1870 (aged 73); Pforta

Karl August Koberstein (also August Karl Koberstein; 10 January 1797, Rügenwalde – 8 March 1870, Pforta) was a German literary historian.

== Biography ==
He studied at Stolpe and Potsdam, then (1812) at Berlin. He was appointed professor at Schulpforta, where he was actively engaged till his death.

== Work ==
His literary career commenced with his work entitled Ueber das wahrscheinliche Alter und die Bedeutung des Gedichts vom Wartburgkrieg (On the apparent age and significance of the poem on the Wartburg War; 1823). He wrote, notably, Grundriss der Geschichte der deutschen National-literatur (Outline of the history of German literature; 1827), which, in its fourth revision (1847–66), became a comprehensive history of German national literature. This work was extended, after his death, in a fifth edition by Karl Bartsch (Leipzig, 1872–75). His other works include Vermischte Aufsätze zur Literaturgeschichte und Aesthetik (Miscellaneous essays on literary history and aesthetics; Leipzig, 1858), Heinrich von Kleists Briefe an seine Schwester Ulrike (Heinrich von Kleist's letters to his sister Ulrike; Berlin, 1860). He contributed to Löbell's Entwicklung der deutschen Poesie (Development of German poetry), the volume on Lessing (1865).

== Family ==
His son Karl Koberstein was a noted dramatist.
