= Nielba Wągrowiec (handball) =

Polish handball club

- Full name: Miejski Klub Sportowy Nielba Wągrowiec
- Short name: Nielba
- Founded: 1960
- Arena: OSiR Hall, Wągrowiec
- Capacity: 3000
- Head coach: Bartosz Świerad
- League: I liga (II)
Home	Away

Nielba Wągrowiec is a men's handball club from Wągrowiec, Greater Poland. The club also has an association football section.

== History ==
The handball section at the Nielba Wągrowiec club was established in 1960. In the 1960s and early 1970s the handball players of the team from Wągrowiec played in the "A Division", the "regional league" and the "territorial league". In 1973 they won the Polish Championship of the Railways Federation. In the 1973/1974 season they were promoted to the 2nd national league, in which they played for two years. They played again at this level in the 1980/1981 and 1984/1985 seasons. after that were promoted once again to the second division in 1993. After the reorganization of the league pyramid in 1998, they found themselves in the third division. In the 2004/2005 season they were promoted to the top national division.

In 2005–2009, Nielba was one of the leading teams in the 1st league. In the 2008/2009 season, the team won the league; they achieved 22 victories in 22 matches; they were four points ahead of the second in the table Śląsk Wrocław, and were promoted as a result.

Nielba made her debut in the top league on September 5, 2009, losing in the home game against Azoty-Puławy (30:31). The first victory was achieved in the next round, defeating NMC Powen Zabrze (30:25) in the away game. In the main round of the 2009/2010 season, the handball players from Wągrowiec took 7th place (eight wins, three draws, 11 defeats), joining the play-offs. In them they lost to Wisła Płock (18:32; 30:35) and Traveland-Społem Olsztyn (30:32; 31:32), and then to defeat Piotrków Trybunalski (28:27; 29:21) and achieved 7th place in the final standings. In the 2010/2011 and 2011/2012 seasons, Nielba finished the seasons in 10th place, which meant playing in the relegation play-offs. In May 2011, the club from Wągrowiec defeated Gwardia Opole (29:24; 30:16), keeping their place in the Super League. In May 2012, they lost the play-offs to Czuwaj Przemyśl (27:33; 40:33), dropping back to the first league.

In the 2012/2013 and 2013/2014 seasons, Nielba took 2nd place in the 1st league, entitling to play in the play-offs for promotion to the Super league. In 2013, the team from Wągrowiec was defeated by Chrobry Głogów (26:22; 16:31), while in 2014 they won with Piotrkowianin Piotrków Trybunalski (31:29; 25:20), thus returning to the highest league. In the 2014/2015 season, they took 12th place: three wins; one in the regular round, two in matches for places 9-12; 25 defeats; which had them relegated once more.

== Team ==
=== Current squad ===
Squad for the 2025–26 season

Goalkeepers

- (Poland) Dawid Dekarz

Left Wingers
Right Wingers
Line players

- (Poland) Eliasz Kapela

Left Backs
Central Backs
Right Backs

=== Transfers ===
Transfers for the 2025–26 season

Joining

- (Poland) Eliasz Kapela (LP) from (Poland) KPR Legionowo
- (Poland) Dawid Dekarz (GK) from (Poland) Stal Mielec

Leaving

== Achievements ==
=== Team ===
- Polish Championship:
  - 7th place: 2009/2010
- Polish Second Division:
  - 1st place: 2008/2009
  - 2nd place: 2006/2007, 2007/2008, 2012/2013, 2013/2014
  - 3rd place: 2005/2006

=== Individual ===
- Superliga top scorer
  - Dawid Przysiek: 2011/2012 (170 goals)
- I liga top scorer:
  - Sebastian Bukowski: 2005/2006 (204 goals)
