= Wilhelm Adolf Schmidt =

German historian (1812-1887)

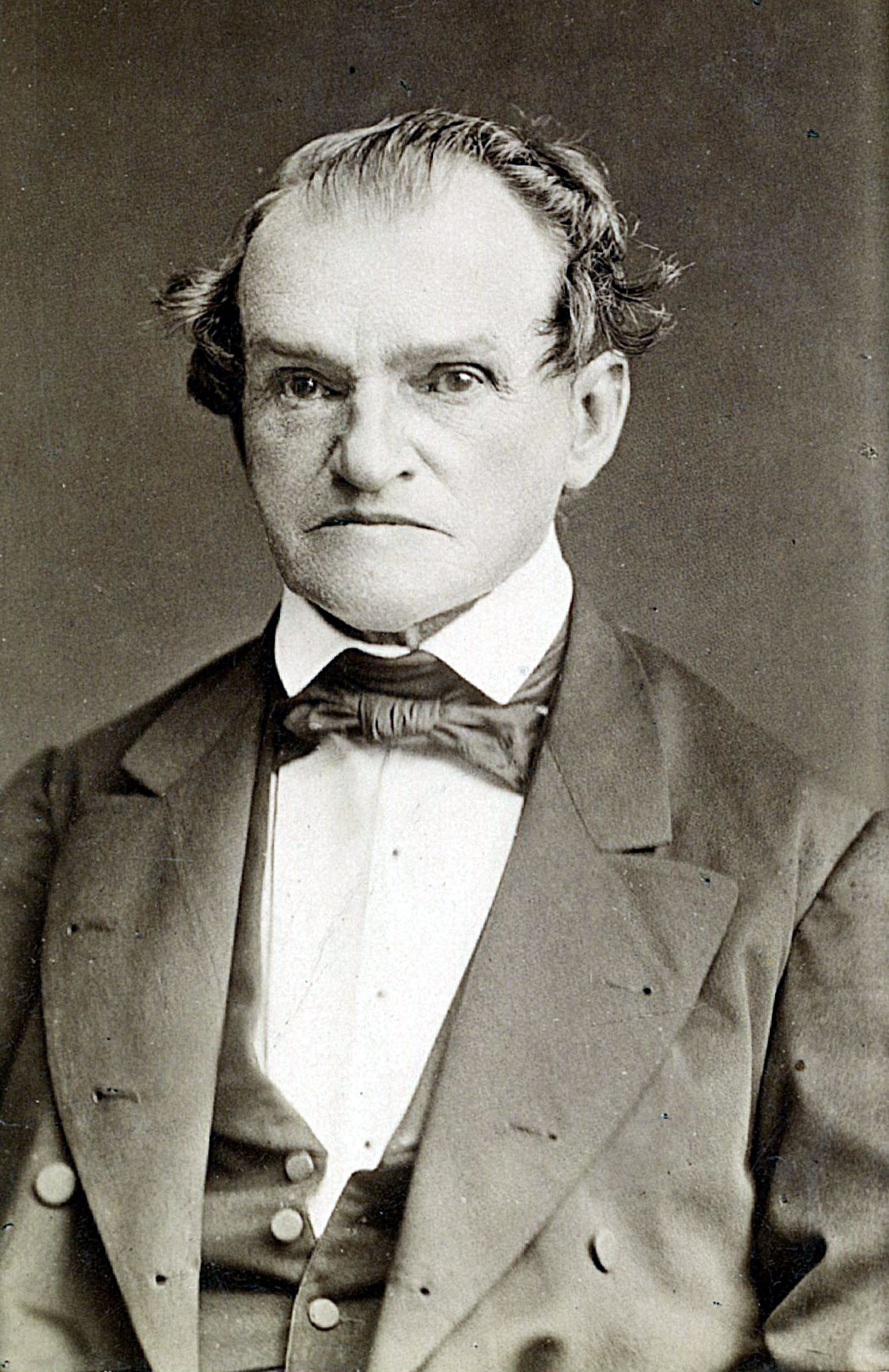
Wilhelm Adolf Schmidt (ca. 1885)

Wilhelm Adolf Schmidt (26 September 1812, Berlin – 10 April 1887) was a German historian.

== Biography ==
He studied at Berlin, in 1839 becoming a lecturer there, and in 1845 professor. In 1851, he became professor for history at the University of Zürich; nine years, he went to the University of Jena, where he remained for the rest of his life. He was a member of the Frankfurt Parliament in 1848, and of the German Reichstag from 1874 to 1876.

== Works ==
=== German history ===
This is his main body of work, mostly limited to the 19th century. The most important are:

- Geschichte der Denk- und Glaubensfreiheit im ersten Jahrhundert der Kaiserherrschaft und des Christentums (1847)
- Preussens deutsche Politik (Berlin, 1850, and other editions)
- Geschichte der preussisch-deutschen Unionsbestrebungen (Berlin, 1851)
- Zeitgenössische Geschichten: I. Frankreich von 1815 bis 1830. II. Oesterreich von 1830 bis 1848 (Berlin, 1859)
- Elsass und Lothringen (Leipzig, 1859 and 1870)
- Geschichte der deutschen Verfassungsfrage während der Befreiungskriege und des Wiener Kongresses (Stuttgart, 1890), which was published after his death by A Stern.

He edited the 8th issue of Karl Friedrich Becker's Weltgeschichte, 22 vols. (Leipzig, 1874–79).

=== Non-German History ===
- Tableaux de la Révolution Française publiés sur les papiers inédits du département de la police secrete de Paris (Leipzig, 1867-1870)
- Pariser Zustände während der Revolutionszeit (Jena, 1874—1876), translated into French by Paul Viollet (Paris, 1880—1885)
- Das Perikleische Zeitalter (Jena, 1877—1879)
- Handbuch der griechischen Chronologie (Jena, 1888)
- Abhandlungen zur alten Geschichte (Leipzig, 1888).

== See also ==
- The Revolutions of 1848 in the German states
