= Karl Koberstein =

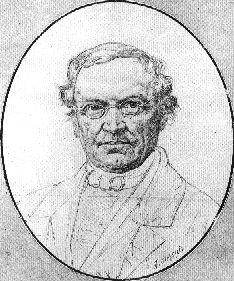
Karl Koberstein.

Karl Koberstein (born Schulpforta, 15 February 1836; died Wilmersdorf, 15 September 1899) was a German dramatist.

== Biography ==
He was the son of August Koberstein, a literary historian. He studied at the Stettin gymnasium, and then dedicated his life to the stage (1856). He was a member of the Dresden court theatre from 1862 until his retirement in 1883. He gained renown through his tragedies Florian Geyer (Dresden, 1863) and König Erich XIV (Dresden, 1869), and the comedy Was Gott zuzammenfügt, das soll der Mensch nicht scheiden (What God joins together, people should not part; Dresden, 1872). He published the Preussisches Bilderbuch (Prussian picture book; Leipzig 1887).
