= Karl Friedrich Becker =

German educator and historian (1777–1806)

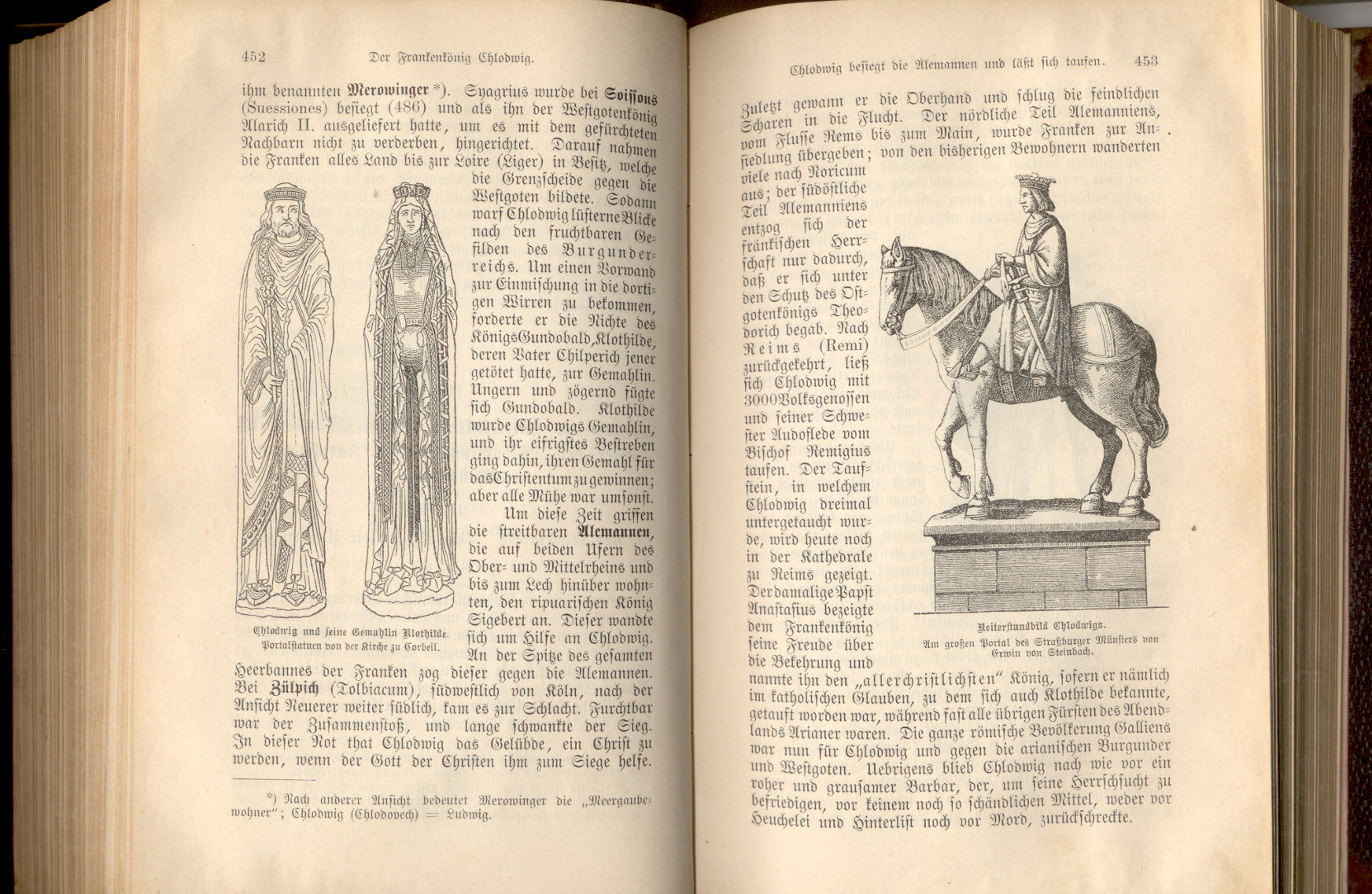
Two pages from Becker's "Weltgeschichte" (1885 edition)

Karl Friedrich Becker (11 March 1777 – 15 March 1806) was a German educator and historian. His major work was World History for Children and Teachers of Children (German: Weltgeschichte für Kinder und Kinderlehrer) which was widely used. It was much edited and revised by others after Becker's death.

== Biography ==
Becker was a native of Berlin. He studied history and philosophy at the University of Halle, and after finishing his studies, worked as a tutor in Cottbus. From 1798 to 1800 he was a schoolteacher in Berlin, but due to poor health had to resign from teaching and devote his time to literary and historical work. Becker died on 15 March 1806 at the age of 29. His grave is preserved in the Protestant Friedhof I der Jerusalems- und Neuen Kirchengemeinde (Cemetery No. I of the congregations of Jerusalem's Church and New Church) in Berlin-Kreuzberg, south of Hallesches Tor.

== Works ==
Becker is remembered today as author of the nine-volume Weltgeschichte für Kinder und Kinderlehrer. This work was published in Berlin between 1801 and 1805, and after his death was continued, edited and revised by numerous authors. Karl Ludwig Woltmann added a tenth volume, and Karl Adolf Menzel two more. Wilhelm Adolf Schmidt's edition of 1860-67 contains 20 volumes, including Karl Eduard Arnd's Geschichte der letzten vierzig Jahre and its continuations to 1867. The same author's Geschichte der Jahre 1867-1871 (1st vol., 1872) also served as a supplement. Johann Wilhelm Löbell was an editor. Though gaining in fullness and accuracy, the revisions lost something of the charm of Becker's original presentation.

Other publications by Becker include:

- Tales from history for young people (German: Erzählungen aus der Alten Welt für die Jugend; 3 vols., 1801-1803, Halle; 4th vol. by Günther, 1842, containing Die Perserkriege; 9th and revised ed. by Eckstein, 1857; later edition by Hermann Masius, 1873)
- Poetry from the Viewpoint of the Historian (German: Die Dichtkunst aus dem Gesichtspunkt des Historikers; Berlin, 1803)
