= Karl Eduard Arnd =

German historian and author

Karl Eduard Arnd (23 February 1802 – 3 September 1874) was a German historian and author who was a native of Wągrowiec.

Arnd studied at the Universities of Breslau and Berlin. During his career he lived and worked in Paris and Berlin. He is remembered for his numerous works on French history. In Karl Friedrich Becker's Weltgeschichte für Kinder und Kinderlehrer (World History for Children and Teachers of Children), his contributions involved "Continuation of the French Revolution to the Present", 1871). A few of his other publications in regards to French history are as follows:

- Geschichte des Ursprungs und der Entwickelung des französischen Volks (History on the origin and evolution of the French people), Leipzig, 1844–46 (3 volumes).
- Geschichte der französischen Revolution von 1789 bis 1799 (History of the French Revolution from 1789 to 1799), Braunschweig, 1851 (six volumes).
- Geschichte der französischen Nationalliteratur von der Renaissance bis zur Revolution (History of French national literature from the Renaissance to the Revolution), Berlin 1856.

Earlier in his career he was the author of several works that did not involve French history, including adaptations and modifications of existing classics such as Shakespeare's Two Gentlemen of Verona, of which he published with the title Die beiden Edelleute in Venedig (Two Noblemen in Venice). Other miscellaneous writings by Arnd are:

- Die Geschwister von Rimini (The Siblings of Rimini), Breslau 1829.
- Israelitische Gedichte. (Israelite Poems), Stuttgart 1829.
- Cäsar und Pompejus (Caesar and Pompey), Hamburg 1833.
