= Standesamt Wongrowitz =

Standesamt Wongrowitz was a civil registration district (Standesamt) located in Kreis Wongrowitz, province of Posen of the German Empire (1871–1918). This Standesamt was located in and administered the town of Wongrowitz as well as the nearby communities of:

Town	Kreis	Polish Spelling	Type	1905 Pop	Prot.	Cath.	Jews	Police Ofc	Court Ofc	Cath. Ch	Prot. Ch	Other Names
Bartelsee	Wongrowitz	Bartodzije / Bartodzieje	Village	247	44	203	0	Wongrowitz	Wongrowitz	Wongrowitz	Wongrowitz	
Biberfeld	Wongrowitz	Rudnicze / Bobrowniki?	Village	337	6	331	0	Wongrowitz	Wongrowitz	Wongrowitz	Wongrowitz	(Rudnitsch&Bobrowniki Kolonie)
Bismarksaue	Wongrowitz	Pokrzywnica	Village	89	44	45	0	Wongrowitz	Wongrowitz	Prusietz	Wongrowitz	
Blumenfelde	Wongrowitz	Runowskie / Runowskie huby	Village	93	87	6	0	Wongrowitz	Wongrowitz	Potulice	Kaisersaue	(Runowo Hauland)
Bobrownik	Wongrowitz	Bobrowniki	Estate	90	0	90	0	Wongrowitz	Wongrowitz	Wongrowitz	Wongrowitz	
Bukowitz	Wongrowitz	Bukowiec / Bukowie	Village	172	92	80	0	Wongrowitz	Wongrowitz	Wongrowitz	Wongrowitz	(Buchenhöfe)
Buschfelde	Wongrowitz	Mikołajewo	Village	106	62	44	0	Wongrowitz	Wongrowitz	Prusietz	Kaisersaue	
Durowo	Wongrowitz	Durowo	Estate	100	32	68	0	Wongrowitz	Wongrowitz	Wongrowitz	Wongrowitz	
Eichwald	Wongrowitz	Wiatrowo	Village	94	73	21	0	Wongrowitz	Wongrowitz	Prusietz	Wongrowitz	
Jankowo	Wongrowitz	Jankowo	Village	58	16	42	0	Wongrowitz	Wongrowitz	Wongrowitz	Wongrowitz	
Josephsthal	Wongrowitz	Durowskie huby / Kaliska	Village	130	43	87	0	Wongrowitz	Wongrowitz	Wongrowitz	Wongrowitz	(Waldhof)
Kobyletz	Wongrowitz	Kobylec	Village	182	115	67	0	Wongrowitz	Wongrowitz	Wongrowitz	Wongrowitz	
Laziska	Wongrowitz	Łaziska	Village	282	36	246	0	Wongrowitz	Wongrowitz	Wongrowitz	Wongrowitz	
Lengowo	Wongrowitz	Łęgowo	Village	344	32	312	0	Wongrowitz	Wongrowitz	Wongrowitz	Wongrowitz	(Entenflug)
Neuhausen	Wongrowitz	Łaziska	Estate	174	15	159	0	Wongrowitz	Wongrowitz	Wongrowitz	Wongrowitz	
Nowen	Wongrowitz	Nowe / Nowesołectwo	Village	304	116	188	0	Wongrowitz	Wongrowitz	Grylewo	Wongrowitz	(Noven; Neuhof)
Rgielsko	Wongrowitz	Rgielsko	Village	278	7	271	0	Wongrowitz	Wongrowitz	Wongrowitz	Wongrowitz	(Seehausen)
Rudnitsch	Wongrowitz	Rudnicze	Village	107	32	75	0	Wongrowitz	Wongrowitz	Rogasen	Wongrowitz	
Seehausen	Wongrowitz	Rgielsko	Estate	181	33	148	0	Wongrowitz	Wongrowitz	Wongrowitz	Wongrowitz	
Wongrowitz	Wongrowitz	Wągrowiec / Wągrodziec	Town	6040	1393	4264	383	Wongrowitz	Wongrowitz	Wongrowitz	Wongrowitz	(Eichenbrück)

== See also ==
- Wągrowiec (general article about the town where the Standesamt was located)
