= Benecke-Kaliko =

German plastics manufacturer

Coordinates: 52.423311°N 9.708581°E

Benecke-Kaliko AG
- Company type: Aktiengesellschaft (stock corporation)
- Industry: Automotive supplier
- Founded: 1718
- Headquarters: Hanover, Germany
- Key people: Dirk Leiß (Chairman)
- Revenue: €599M (2016)
- Number of employees: 2,900 (2016)
- Website: www.benecke-kaliko.de

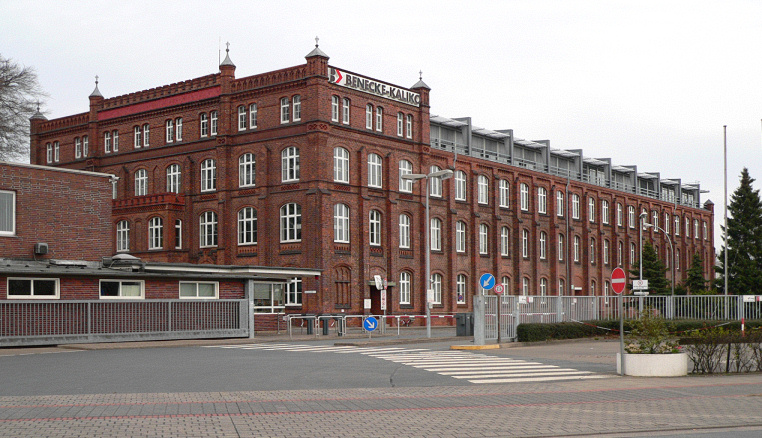
Benecke-Kaliko AG premises in Hanover

Benecke-Kaliko AG is a German plastic and plastic-derivative manufacturing corporation under the Continental AG Group (since 2017) headquartered in Hanover, Germany. It designs and manufactures components for the automotive industry, including upholstery, decorative plastics, paints, and surface-protecting varnishes.

== Company ==
Benecke-Kaliko AG is based in Hanover and forms part of the Benecke-Hornschuch Surface Group, which is a business segment of the ContiTech-Group. Its core expertise lies in the area of automotive interior trims, and In 2016 the company generated €599 million in sales. Benecke-Kaliko's production activities are spread across four sites. With a workforce of over 2,900 employees, Benecke-Kaliko is the world market leader in the manufacture of sheeting for automotive interiors. The company produces soft trim for instrument panels, sun visors, glove compartment covers, airbag seals, door and side trim, seating, centre consoles, and convertible roofs on behalf of automotive manufacturers. Benecke-Kaliko's materials are also installed in airplanes, trains, RVs, ships, and various other industrial applications.

== Main sites and products ==
At its headquarters in the Vinnhorst district of Hanover, Benecke-Kaliko employed roughly 1,000 staff members producing 36 million square metres (390 million square feet) of surface materials in 2015.

At the Eislingen site, 500 employees manufactured in the same year roughly 18 million square metres (190 million square feet) of thermoplastic polyolefin (TPO).

In 2015, Benecke-Kaliko AG produced approximately 86 million square metres (930 million square feet) of surface materials.

In 2006, Benecke Changshun Auto Trim Co., Ltd. was founded in Zhangjiagang, China, and primarily manufactures PVC foam laminate and PVC-expanded leather for the Chinese automotive industry, producing up to 20 million square metres (220 million square feet) per year. In 2013 a TPO production line was added to this location. As of 2018, it employed a workforce of around 480 staff members. This company is a joint venture with the Chinese automotive plastics retailer Jiangsu Changshun Group Co., Ltd.

A new plant was built in San Luis Potosí, Mexico, in 2008. The company has invested around €8 million in the factory. Since the start of 2009, this plant has been producing PVC foam laminate and PVC-expanded leather, as well as TPO compact foil and foam laminate for the American market – up to 7 million square metres (75 million square feet) a year. The plant employed around 250 staff members in 2018.

Benecke-Kaliko has sales offices in numerous countries worldwide such as the USA, Brazil and India.

In the fall of 2014, Benecke-Kaliko started building a second Chinese plant in Changzhou. Series production with a capacity of 10 million square metres (110 million square feet) per year started at the end of 2015 with approximately 100 employees. In 2015, the location had 159 employees. In addition, the company has acquired two locations from the Belgian Mecaseat Group in Pamplona, Spain and in Wągrowiec, Poland. Both locations combined had 150 employees in the year 2018 and a capacity to produce around 8 million square metres (86 million square feet) of surface materials.

== History ==
The company's history dates back to 1718, when wall and ceiling covering materials were produced in Hanover under the name of Königlich privilegierte Wachstuchmacherey vor dem Steinthore (transl. Royally privileged oilcloth factory in front of the stone gate); that is, outside the city walls, on Am Judenkirchhof. The relocation of the plant to its current site in Vinnhorst began in 1898 and the plant was opened in 1901.

The merger with Göppinger Kaliko GmbH took place in 1993, thereby creating the link with ContiTech Holding. In 2017, Benecke-Kaliko purchased the Hornschuch Group, headquartered in Weißbach, Germany, with more than 1,800 employees at four production locations in Germany and the USA and integrated the company in the business segment Benecke-Hornschuch Surface Group operating under the Continental brand. As a result, the company is expanding its industrial business and is opening up new sales markets, especially in North America.
