= Wągrowiec Abbey =

Abbey in Wągrowiec, Poland

Cistercian Abbey in Wągrowiec
- Opactwo Cystersów w Wągrowcu
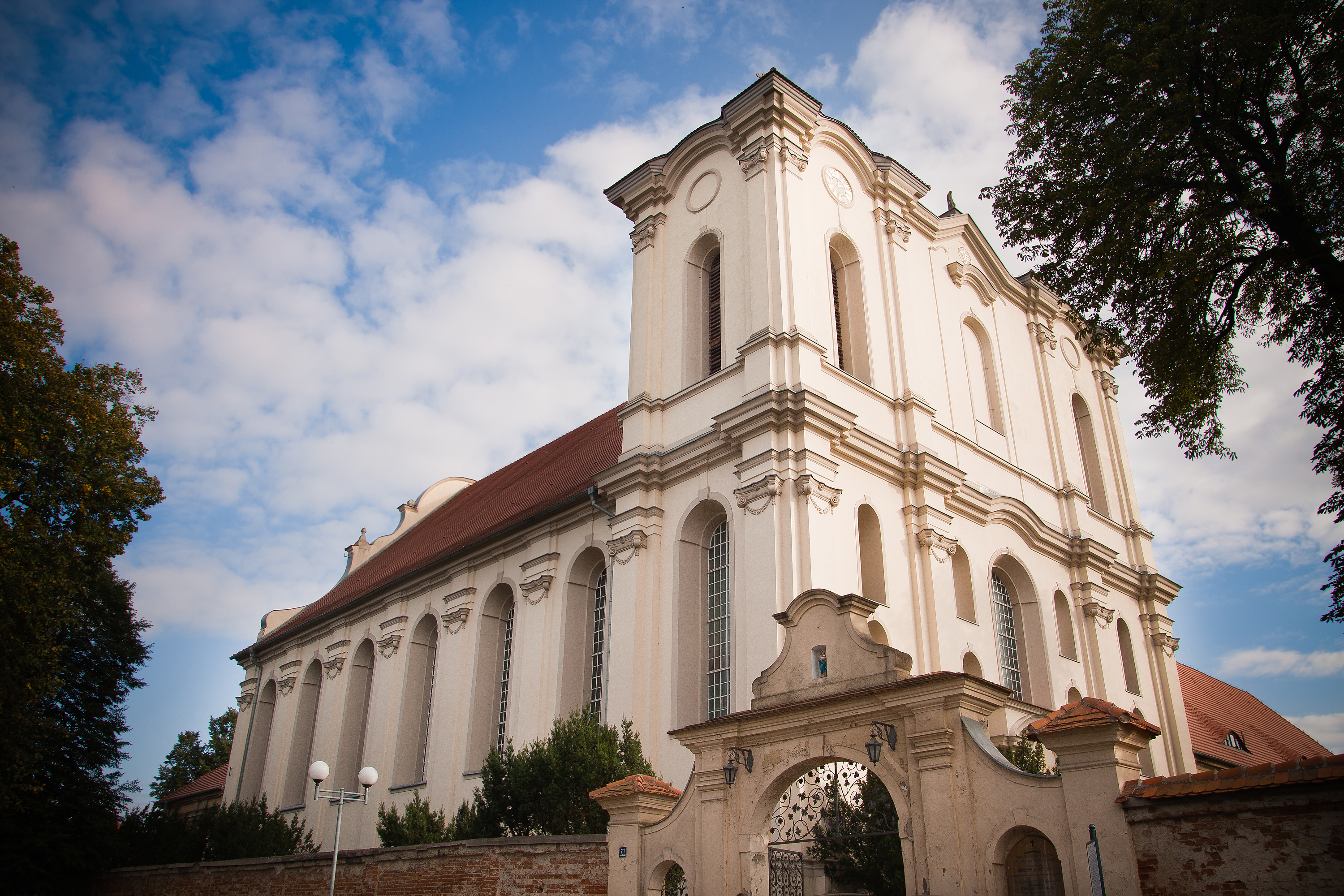
- A view of the Church of the Assumption of Mary from the abbey's entrance

- Location within Poland
- Interactive map of Cistercian Abbey in Wągrowiec

Monastery information
- Order: Cistercians
- Established: 1143

Architecture
- Style: Baroque

Site
- Location: Wągrowiec
- Country: Poland
- Coordinates: 52°48′17.06″N 17°11′30.68″E

Wągrowiec Abbey (Polish: Opactwo Cystersów w Wągrowcu) is a former Cistercian abbey in Wągrowiec, Poland. The former monastery's church is named in honor of the Assumption of Mary and serves as a parish church. The other buildings of the former monastic complex either serve the parish or are part of the local regional museum.

== Gallery ==
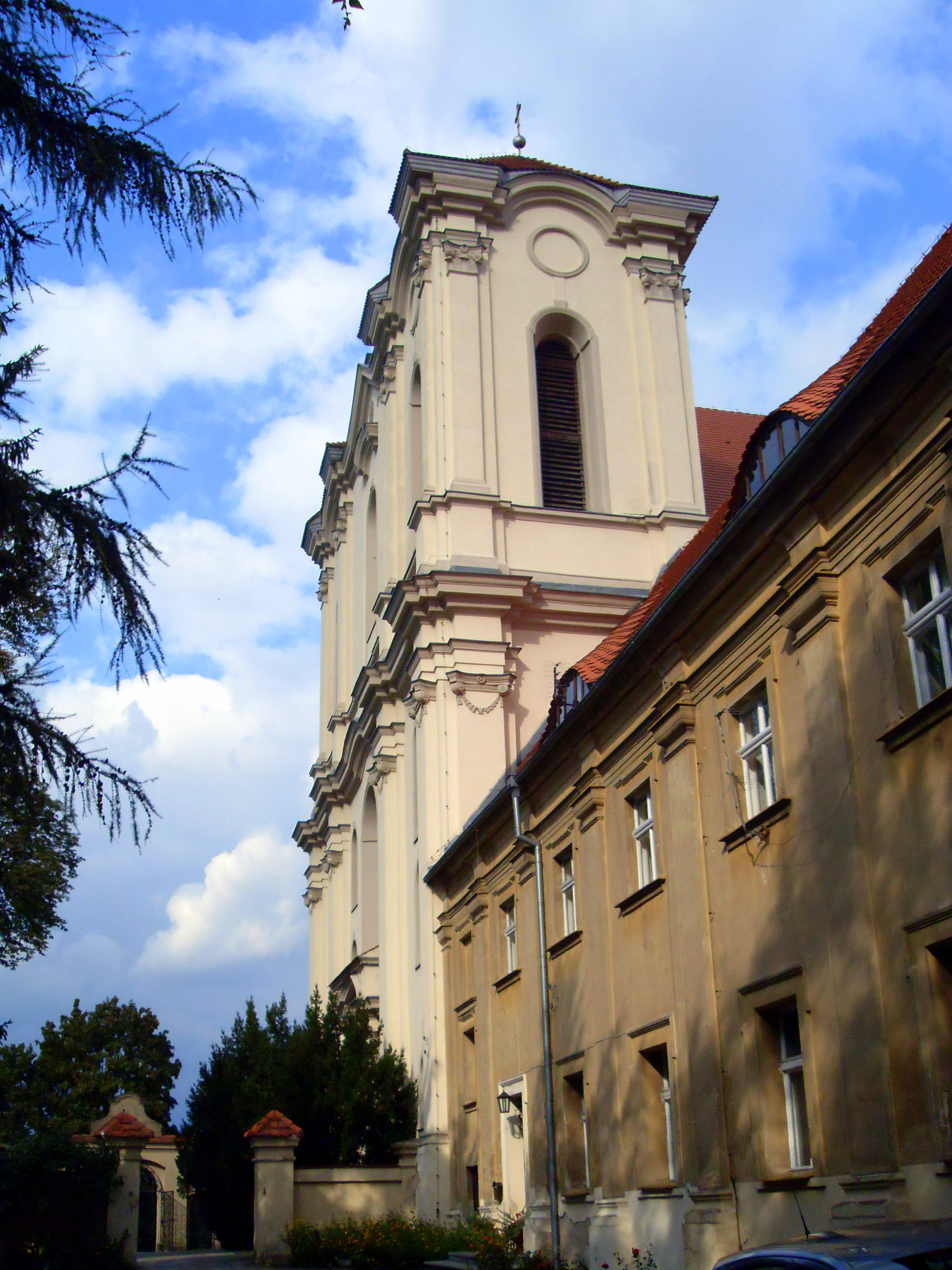
Part of the monastery complex with the church

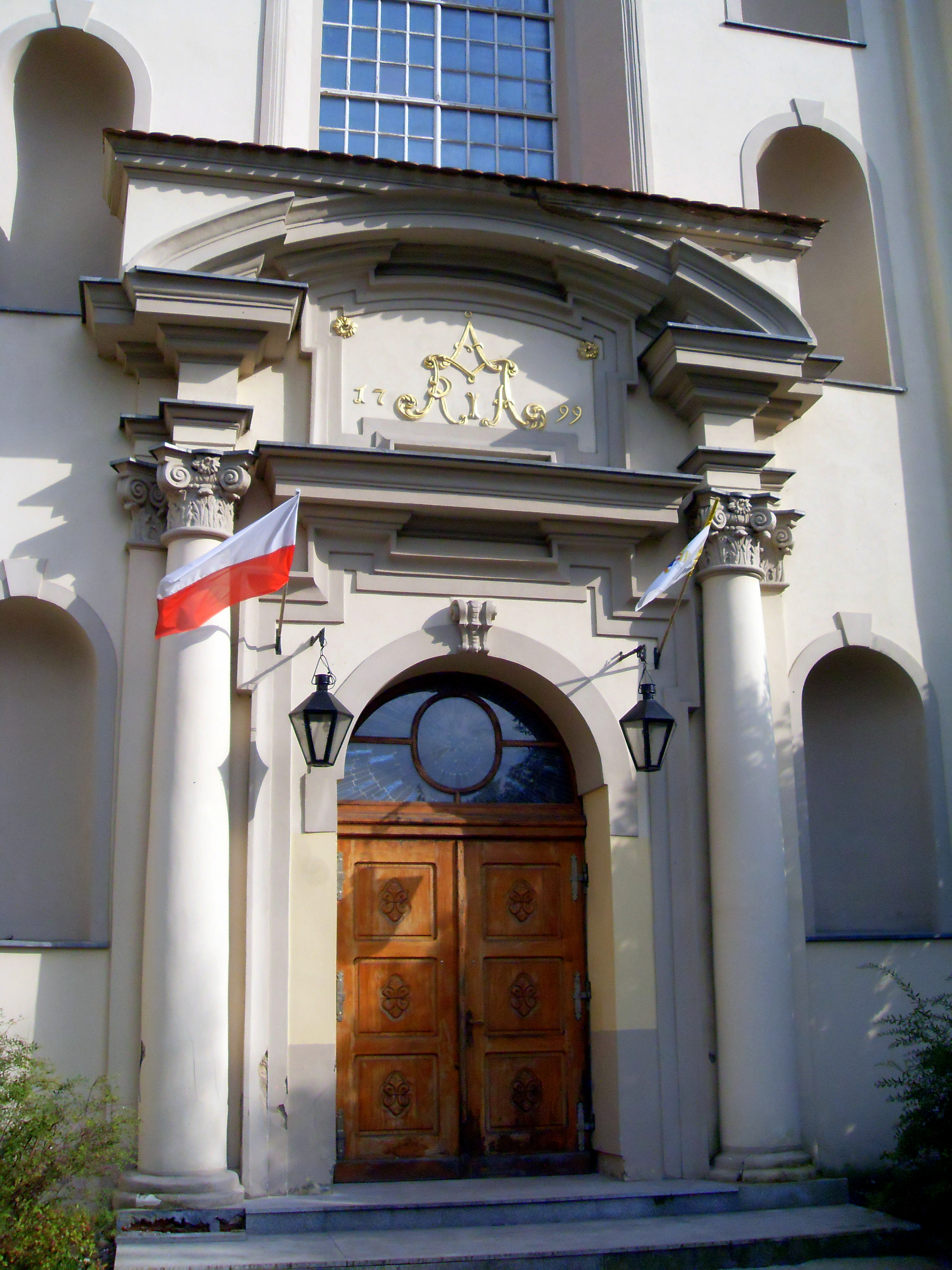
Main church entrance

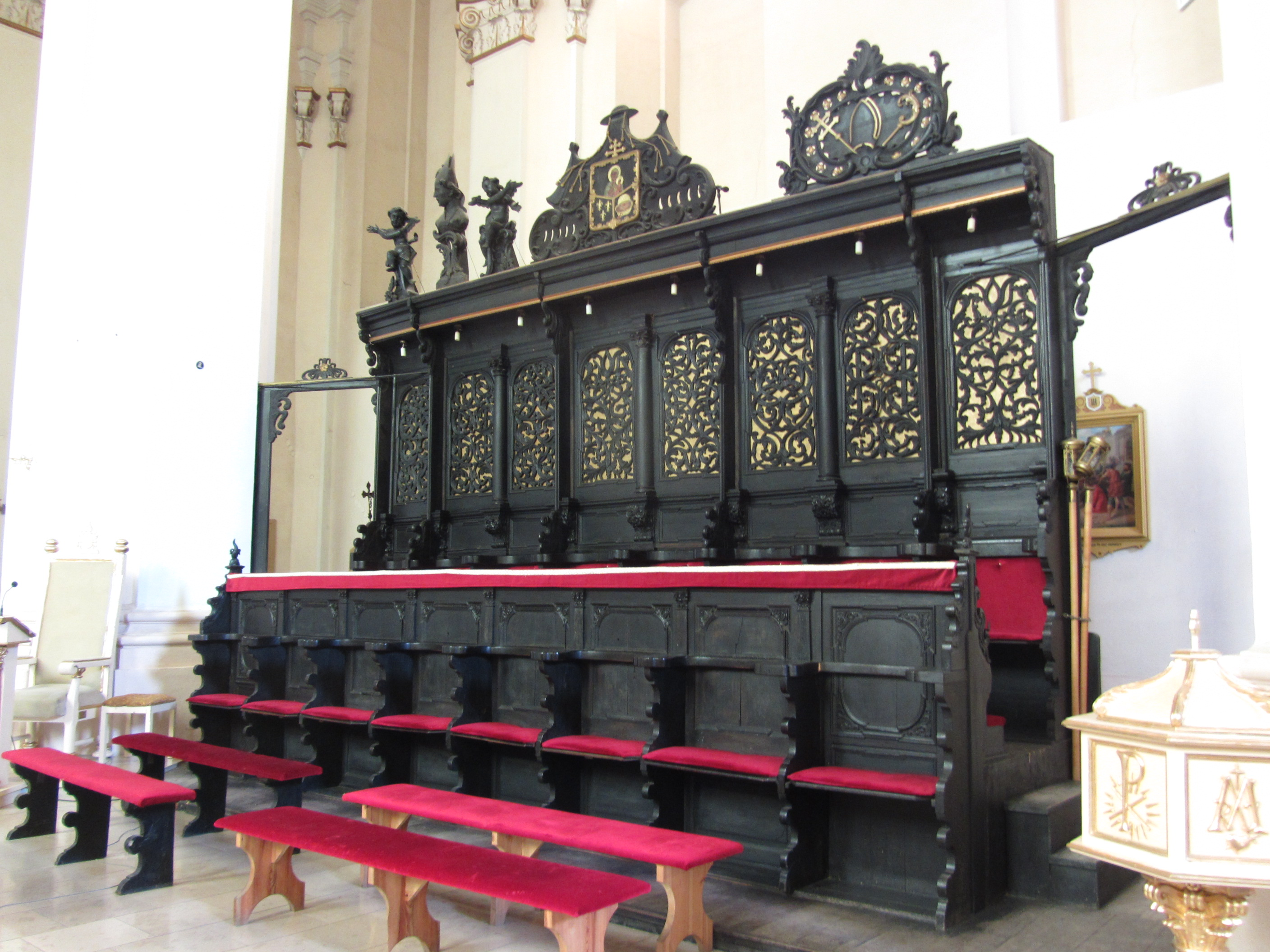
Stalls from 1713

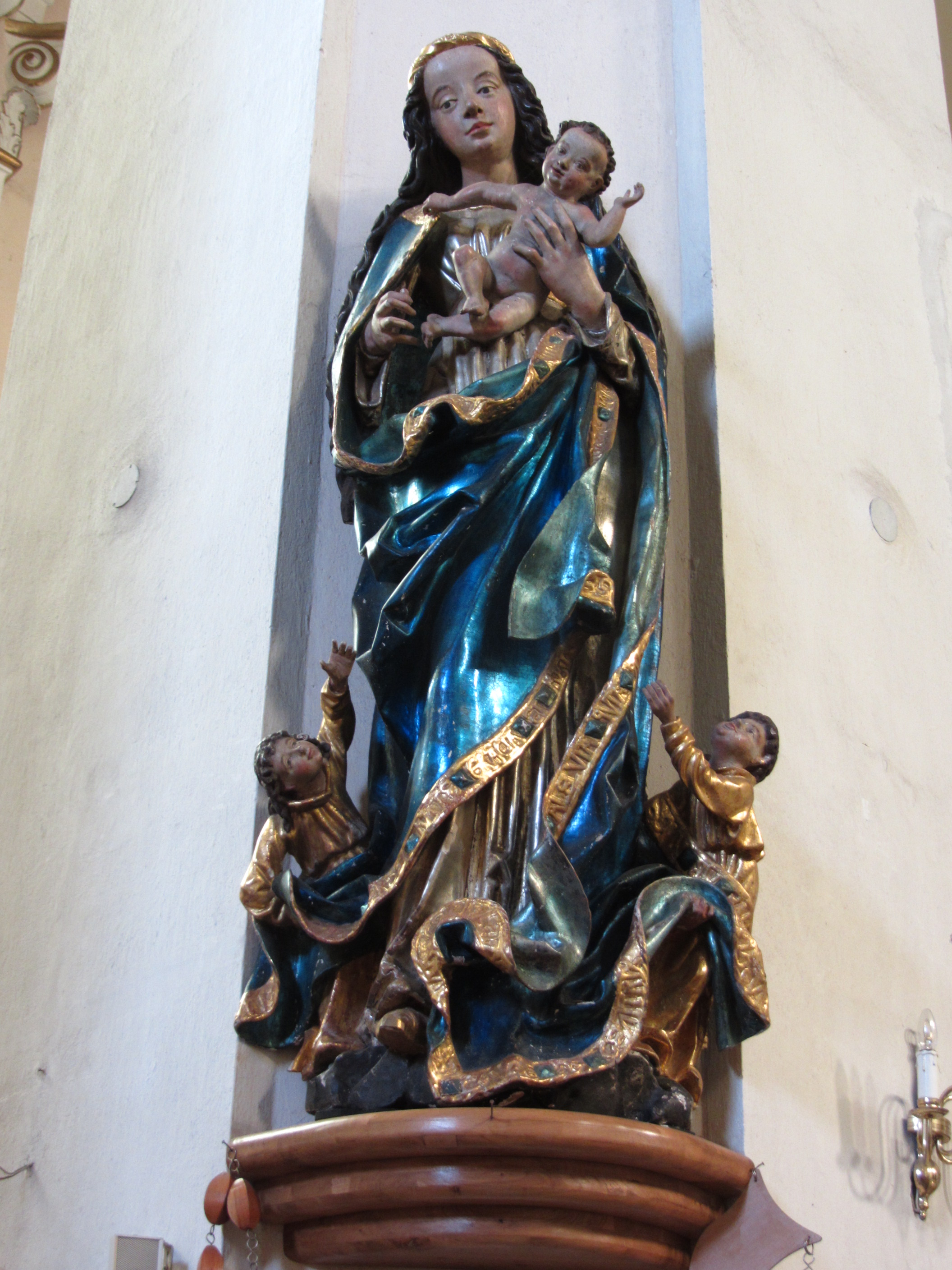
Gothic Saint Mary figure

== See also ==
- List of Cistercian monasteries
