= Gertrud Kolmar =

German poet and writer (1894–1943)

- Born: 10 December 1894; Berlin, Germany
- Died: March 1943 (aged 48)
- Occupations: Poet; writer
- Parent(s): Ludwig Chodziesner; Elise Schoenflies
- Relatives: Walter Benjamin (cousin)
- Writing career
- Pen name: Gertrud Kolmar

Gertrud Käthe Chodziesner (10 December 1894 – March 1943), known by the literary pseudonym Gertrud Kolmar, was a German lyric poet and writer. She was born in Berlin and was murdered, after her arrest and deportation as a Jew, in Auschwitz, a victim of the Nazi's "Final Solution". Though she was a cousin of Walter Benjamin, little is known of her life. She is considered one of the finest poets in the German language.

== Family and early life ==
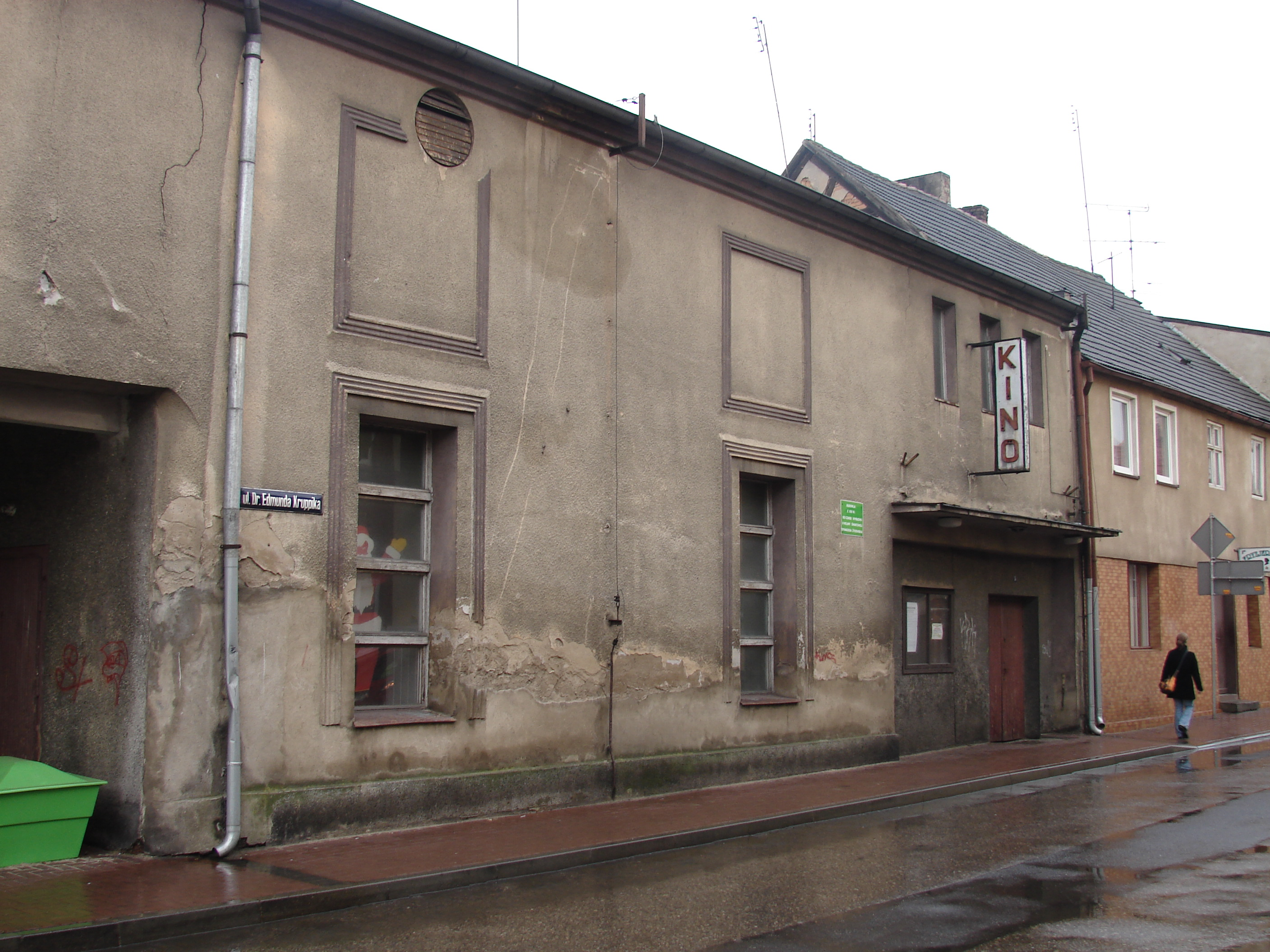
Former Synagogue in Obrzycko, Poland, the city where Gertrud's father Ludwig Israel Chodziesner was born on 28 August 1861.

Gertrud's surname, Chodziesner, traces the family back to Chodzież, Poland. Her Jewish ancestors had been connected to the Greater Poland area for generations, with family members living in Rogoźno and Dobiegniew. This region was annexed by Prussia during the Partitions of Poland in the late 18th century as South Prussia, which later became the Province of Posen. Gertrud's father, Ludwig Chodziesner, spent all of his life in Greater Poland prior to his studies in Berlin. Ludwig was born in Obrzycko and attended high school along with his brothers Siegfried and Max in Wągrowiec which authors Carl Hermann Busse and Stanisław Przybyszewski attended.

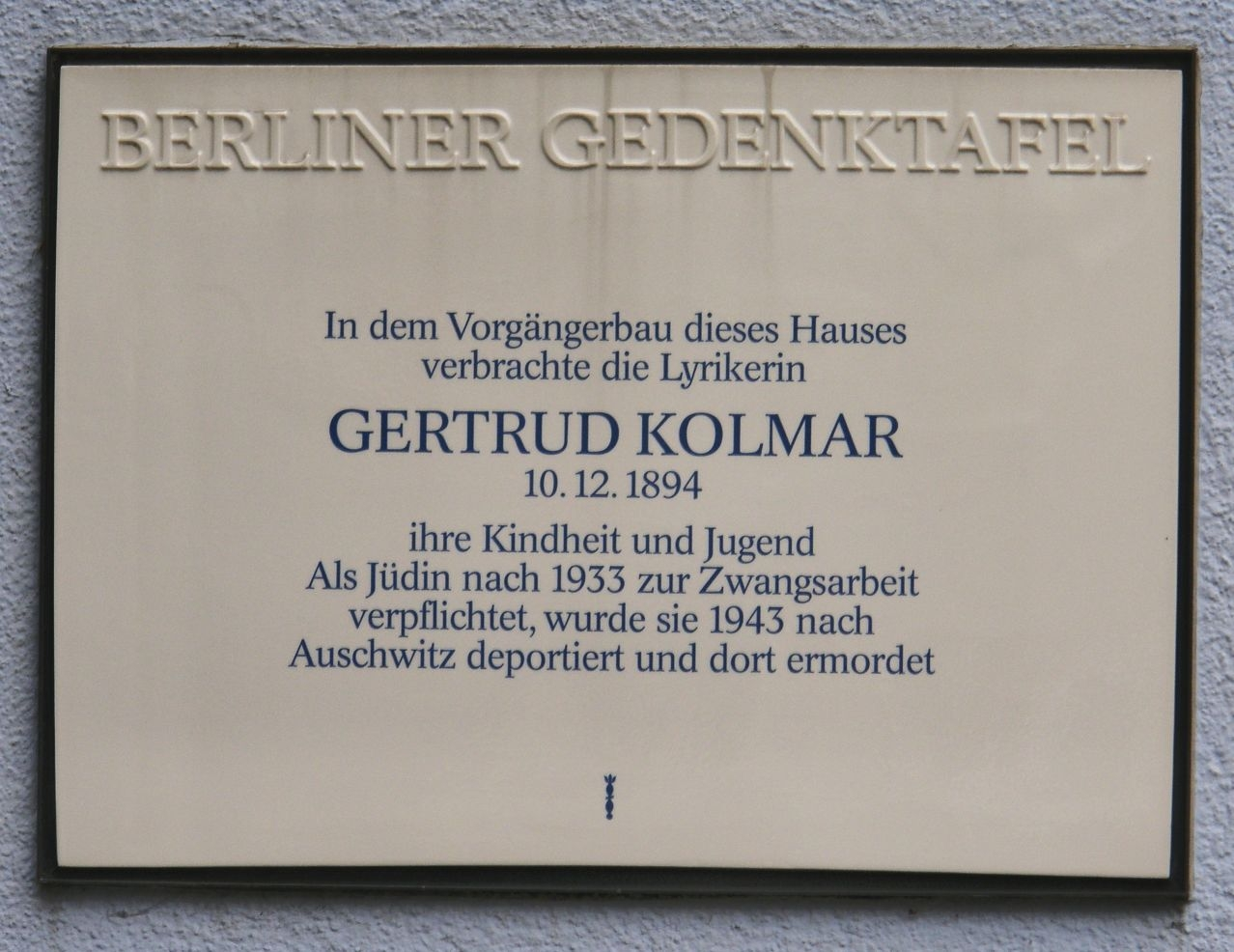
Commemorative plaque for Gertrud Kolmar in Berlin-Westend. Translated, it reads:"The lyric poet Gertrud Kolmar spent her childhood and youth in the previous building on this site. Committed to forced labour as a Jew after 1933, she was deported to Auschwitz in 1943, and murdered there."

Gertrud Kolmar came from an assimilated middle-class German Jewish family. Her father, Ludwig Chodziesner, was a criminal defense lawyer. Her mother, Elise Chodziesner (née Schoenflies), came from an intellectual mercantile family. The oldest of four siblings, she grew up in Berlin's Charlottenburg quarter, in the present-day Berlin-Westend. She attended a private girls' grammar school from 1901 to 1911, and then a women's agricultural and home economics college, Arvedshof, in Elbisbach, near Leipzig.

== Writing ==
In the late 1920s her poems began to appear in various literary journals and anthologies. Her third volume, Die Frau und die Tiere came out under a Jewish publisher's imprint in August 1938 but was pulped after the Kristallnacht pogrom in November of that year. The Chodziesner family, as a result of the intensification of the persecution of Jews under National Socialism, had to sell its house in the Berlin suburb of Finkenkrug, which, to Kolmar's imagination became her 'lost paradise' (das verlorene Paradies), and was constrained to take over a floor in an apartment block called 'Jewshome' (Judenhaus) in the Berlin suburb of Schöneberg.

Post-war critics have accorded Kolmar a very high place in literature. Jacob Picard, in his epilogue to Gertrud Kolmar: Das Lyrische Werk described her both as 'one of the most important woman poets' in the whole of German literature, and 'the greatest lyrical poetess of Jewish descent who has ever lived'. Michael Hamburger withheld judgement on the latter affirmation on the grounds he was not sufficiently competent to judge, but agreed with Picard's high estimation of her as a master poet in the German lyrical canon. Patrick Bridgwater, citing the great range of her imagery and verse forms, and the passionate integrity which runs through her work, likewise writes that she was 'one of the great poets of her time, and perhaps the greatest woman poet ever to have written in German'.

=== Bibliography ===
Original language

- Gedichte, Berlin 1917
- Preußische Wappen, Berlin 1934
- Die Frau und die Tiere, Berlin 1938
- Welten, Berlin 1947
- Das lyrische Werk, Heidelberg [and others] 1955
- Das lyrische Werk, Munich 1960
- Eine Mutter, Munich 1965
- Die Kerze von Arras. Ausgewählte Gedichte. Berlin and Weimar: Aufbau-Verl., 1968
- Briefe an die Schwester Hilde, Munich 1970
- Das Wort der Stummen. Nachgelassene Gedichte, edited, and with an afterword by Uwe Berger and Erinnerungen an Gertrud Kolmar (Memories of Gertrude Kolmar) by Hilde Benjamin, Berlin: Buchverl. Der Morgen, 1978
- Susanna, Frankfurt am Main, 1993; on 2 CDs, Berlin: Herzrasen Records, 2006
- Nacht, Verona 1994
- Briefe, Göttingen 1997

English translation

- Dark Soliloquy: the Selected Poems of Gertrud Kolmar, Translated with an Introduction by Henry A. Smith. Foreword Cynthia Ozick. Seabury Press, NY, 1975 ISBN 978-0-8164-9199-5 or ISBN 0-8164-9199-2
- A Jewish Mother from Berlin: A Novel; Susanna: A Novella, tr. Brigitte Goldstein. New York, London: Holmes & Meier, 1997. ISBN 978-0-8419-1345-5
- My Gaze Is Turned Inward: Letters 1934–1943 (Jewish Lives), ed. Johanna Woltmann, tr. Brigitte Goldstein. Evanston, Illinois: Northwestern University Press, 2004. ISBN 978-0-8101-1854-6
