= Wełna (river) =

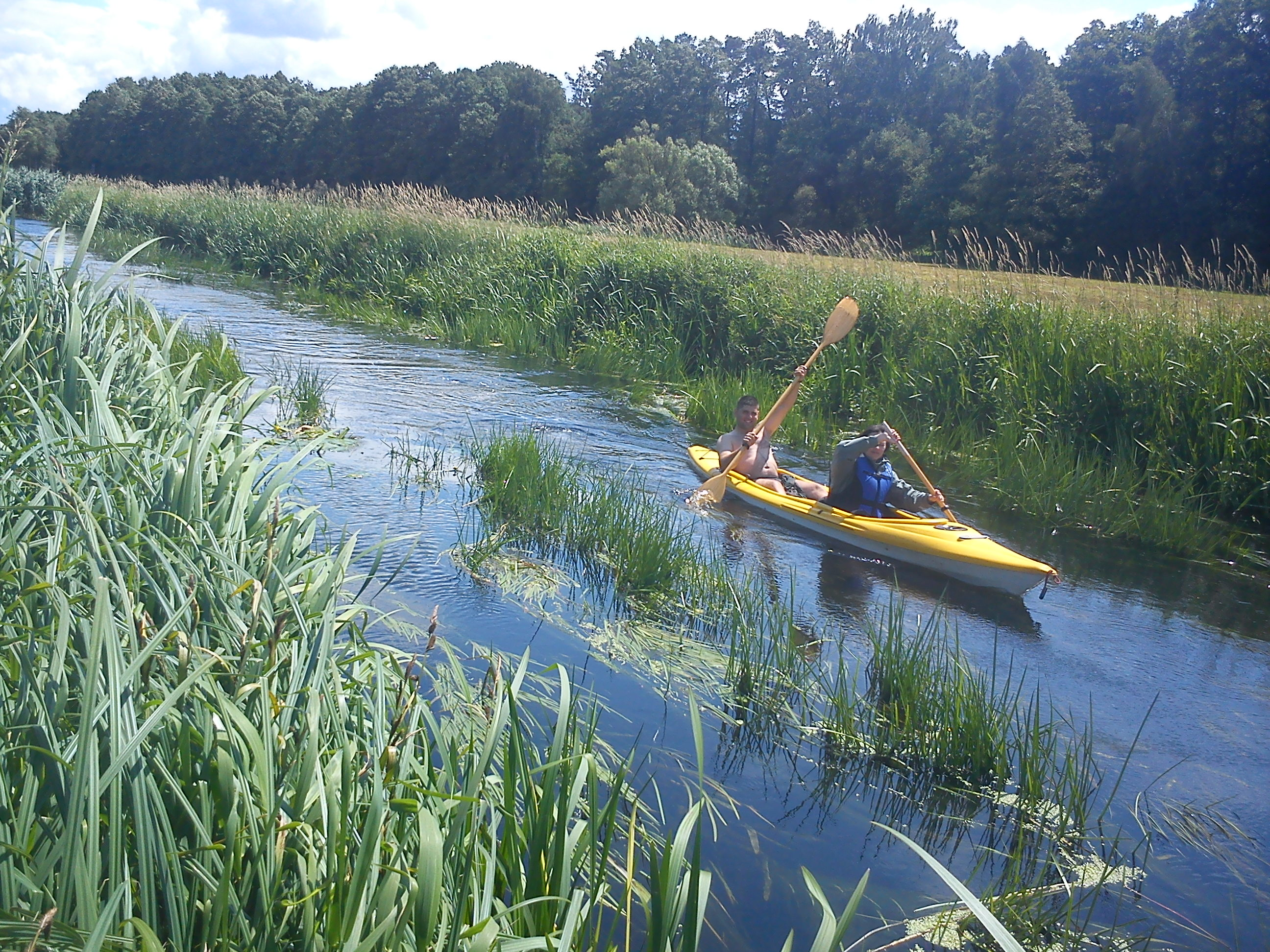

Physical characteristics
- Mouth
  - location: Warta
  - coordinates: 52.6442°N 16.8047°E
- Length: 118 km (73 mi)
- Basin size: 2,635 km^{2} (1,017 sq mi)
- Discharge
  - average: 9.2 m^{3}/s (320 cu ft/s)

Basin features
- Progression: Warta→ Oder→ Baltic Sea

The Wełna (German: Welna, also Kleine Warthe) is a river in west-central Poland, a right tributary of the Warta river, with a length of 118 kilometres (73 mi) and a basin area of 2,635 square kilometres (1,017 sq mi).

== See also ==
- Rivers of Poland
