= Johann Wilhelm Löbell =

German historian (1786–1863)

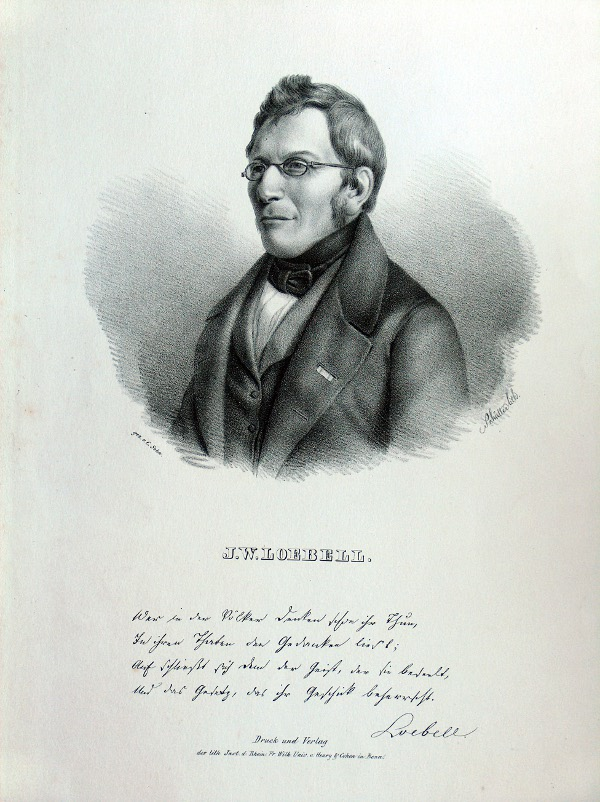
- Löbell in 1845
- Born: 15 September 1786; Berlin
- Died: 12 July 1863 (aged 76); Bonn
- Education: Heidelberg University; Humboldt University of Berlin
- Occupation: Historian

Johann Wilhelm Löbell (15 September 1786 – 12 July 1863) was a German historian.

== Biography ==
Löbell was a native of Berlin. He studied at the Universities of Heidelberg and Berlin under Wolf and Böckh. He had entered the scholarly life against the wishes of his mother who wanted him to go into business. During the War of the Sixth Coalition (1812–14), he served as a volunteer in a Landwehr installation. He was not on the frontlines but worked in a supporting office.

In 1814 he moved to Breslau, where he soon found work as a teacher in a war college. There he published a historical paper and another one on building connections between the sciences and humanities in gymnasium studies. In 1823, he went to work in Berlin at a military academy as a history teacher. There he also became involved with the issuance of new editions of Karl Friedrich Becker's "Weltgeschichte" (World history). He eventually oversaw the issuance of three new editions. During this time period he was friends to Henrich Steffens (1773-1845) and Friedrich von Raumer (1781-1873).

In 1829 he became an associate professor of history at the University of Bonn, where two years later he became a full professor. Among the works he wrote at Bonn were "Gregor von Tours und seine Zeit" (Gregory of Tours and his times, 1839), a revision of Becker's "Weltgeschichte" (1836–38), "Weltgeschichte in Umrissen und Ausführungen" (World history outlined and explained Part I, 1846), "Die Entwicklung der deutschen Poesie von Klopstocks erstem Auftreten bis zu Goethes Tode" (The development of German poetry from Klopstock until Goethe's death, 1856–65), and "Historische Briefe" (Letters on history, 1861), an anonymous attack on Ultramontanism.

== Legacy ==
Löbell's large personal library is now kept in a school library at the Bielefeld Ratsgymnasium, and is property of the city of Bielefeld.
