= Obrzycko =

Town in Greater Poland Voivodeship Poland

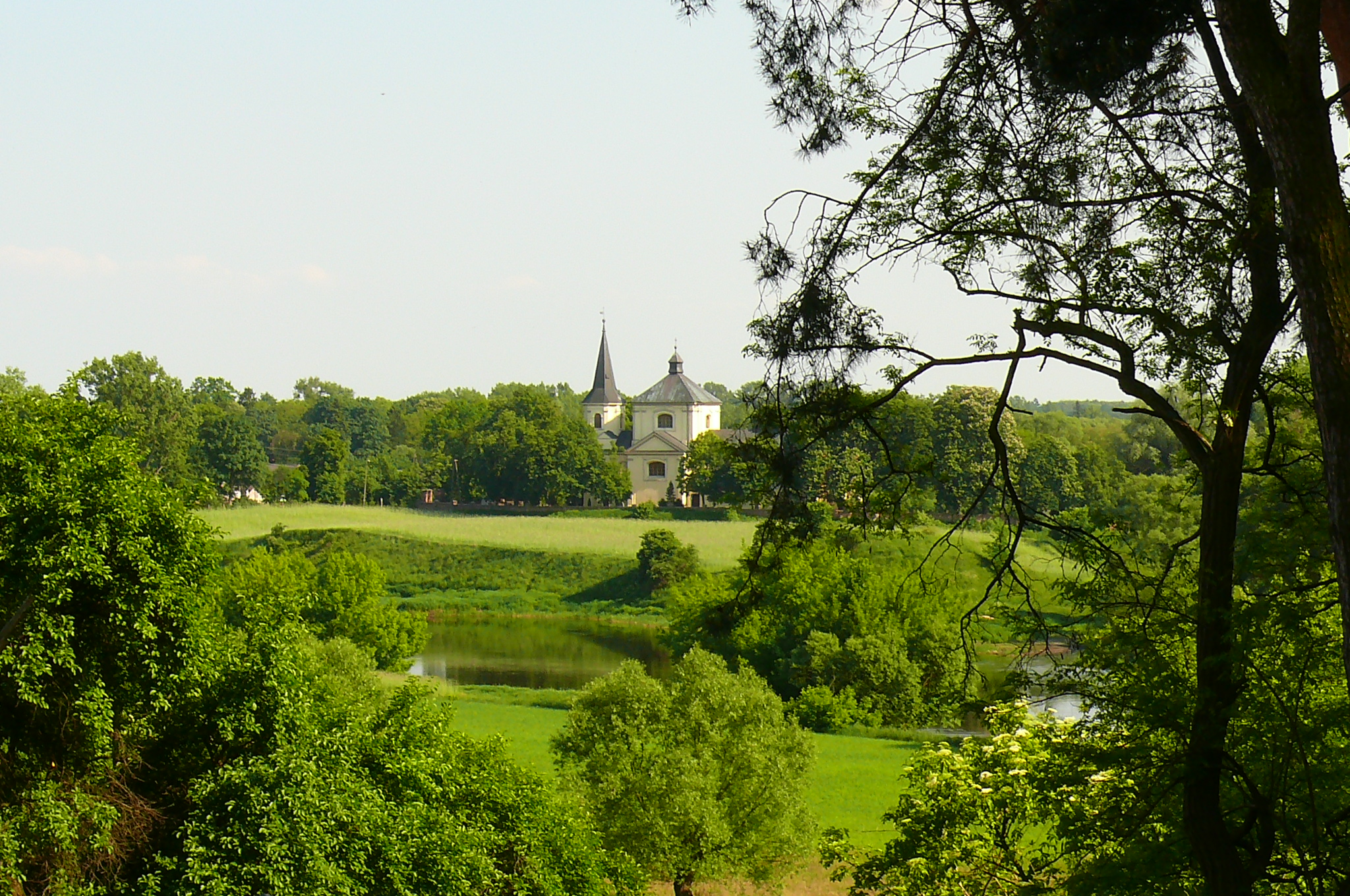
- Warta River and Baroque Saints Peter and Paul church

- Coat of arms

- Location within Poland
- Coordinates: 52°42′23″N 16°31′45″E
- Country: Poland
- Voivodeship: Greater Poland
- County: Szamotuły
- Gmina: Obrzycko (urban gmina)
- First mentioned: 1238
- Town rights: 1458-1580, 1638-1934, 1990

Government
  - City mayor: Igor Kołoszuk

Area
  - Total: 3.72 km^{2} (1.44 sq mi)

Population (2010)
  - Total: 2,262
  - Density: 608/km^{2} (1,570/sq mi)
- Time zone: UTC+1 (CET)
  - Summer (DST): UTC+2 (CEST)
- Postal code: 64-520
- Area code: +48 61
- Vehicle registration: PSZ
- Website: http://www.obrzycko.com/

Obrzycko ([ɔˈbʐɨt͡skɔ]) is a town in Szamotuły County, Greater Poland Voivodeship, in western Poland, with 2,262 inhabitants (2010).

Nearby municipalities include Wronki, Ostroróg, and Szamotuły.

== History ==
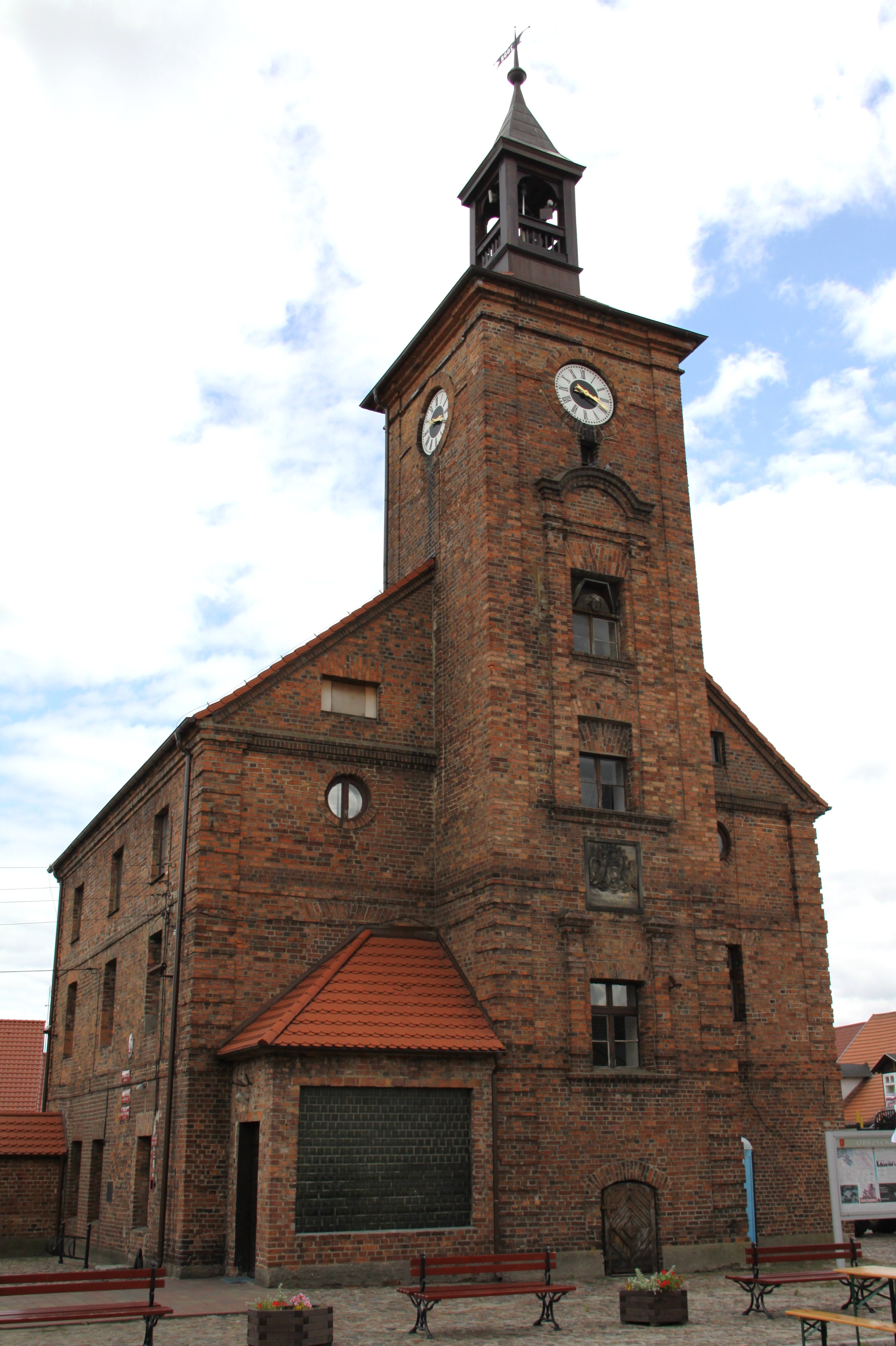
Town Hall

As part of the region of Greater Poland, i.e. the cradle of the Polish state, the area formed part of Poland since its establishment in the 10th century. It was mentioned as a seat of a castellany in 1238. Obrzycko was a private village of Polish nobility, and later a private town, administratively located in the Poznań County in the Poznań Voivodeship in the Greater Poland Province.

In the course of the Second Partition of Poland in 1793, the town was annexed by the Kingdom of Prussia. Following the successful Greater Poland uprising of 1806, it was regained by Poles and included within the short-lived Duchy of Warsaw. After the duchy's dissolution, it became part of Prussia again after the Congress of Vienna in 1815, and from 1818 it belonged to the Samter district.

As part of the Prussian Province of Posen, the town became part of Germany in 1871 under the Germanized name Obersitzko. The local population was subjected to Germanisation policies. At the beginning of the 20th century the town had a Protestant and a Catholic church, a synagogue, a furniture factory and a sawmill. According to. the census of 1910, the town had a population of 1,746, of which 1,018 (58.3%) were Germans and 725 (41.5%) were Poles. After World War I, it was involved in the Greater Poland uprising and soon became part of newly reborn Poland.

During the joint German-Soviet invasion of Poland, which started World War II in September 1939, the town was occupied by the German Wehrmacht. It became part of the Samter district in the newly formed province of Reichsgau Wartheland. In 1942, the occupiers established a subcamp of the Stutthof concentration camp in the town. Towards the end of the war, the Red Army captured the area and the town was restored to Poland.

== Demographics ==
Historical population

| Year | Pop. | ±% |
|---|---|---|
| 1810 | 1,664 | — |
| 1843 | 1,769 | +6.3% |
| 1880 | 1,605 | −9.3% |
| 1890 | 1,544 | −3.8% |

| Year | Pop. | ±% |
|---|---|---|
| 1910 | 1,746 | +13.1% |
| 1921 | 1,503 | −13.9% |
| 1931 | 1,776 | +18.2% |
| 2010 | 2,262 | +27.4% |

== Notable residents ==
- Abraham Berliner (1833-1915), historian
- O.E. Hasse (1903 -1978), German actor
- Ludwig Chodziesner (1861-1943) Lawyer and father of poet Gertrud Kolmar

== See also ==
The Jewish Cemetery in Obrzycko
