= Wągrowiec =

Town in Wielkopolska, Poland

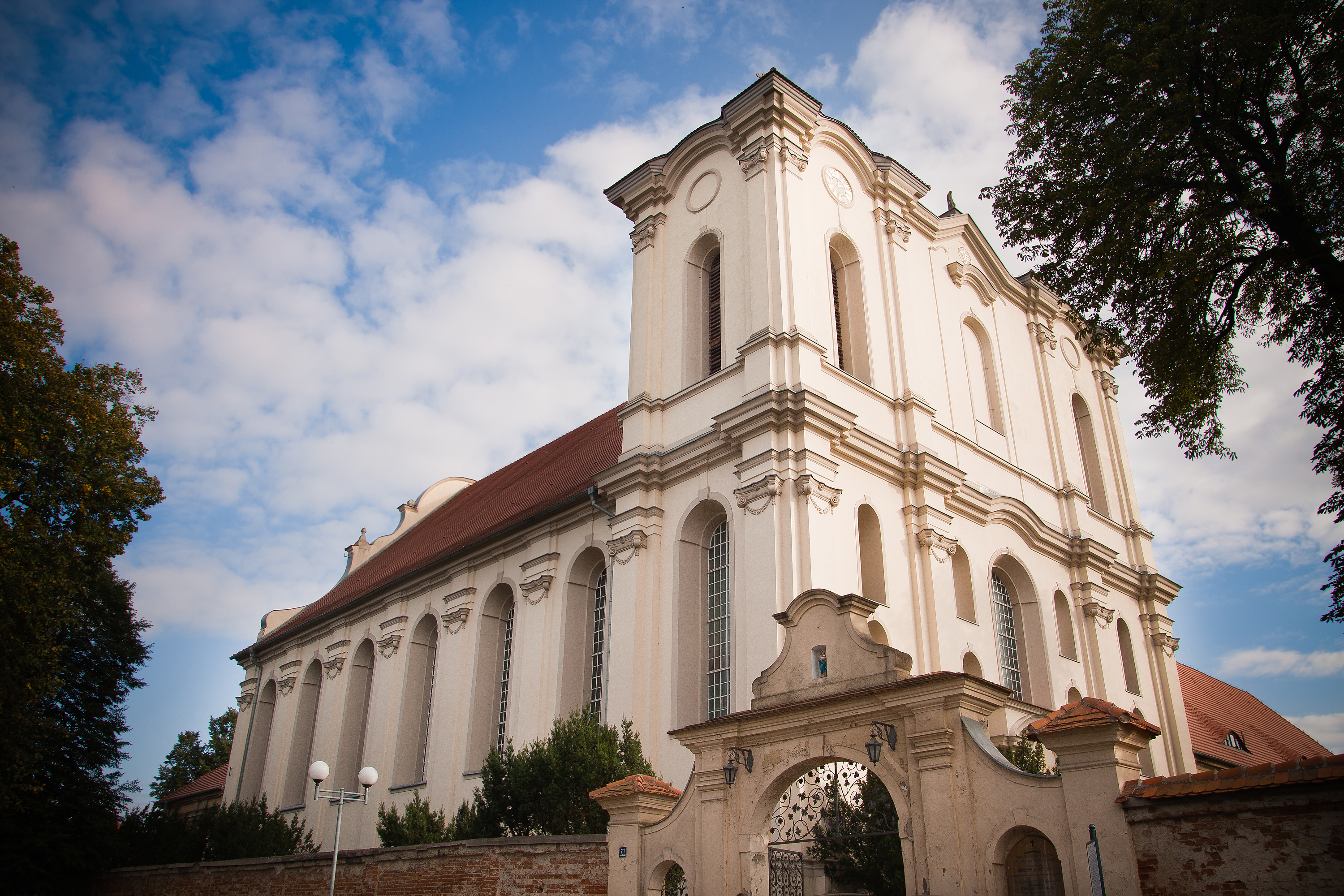
- Cistercian monastery

- Flag Coat of arms

- Location within Poland
- Coordinates: 52°48′N 17°12′E
- Country: Poland
- Voivodeship: Greater Poland
- County: Wągrowiec
- Gmina: Wągrowiec (urban gmina)
- Town rights: 1381

Government
  - Mayor: Alicja Trytt

Area
  - Total: 17.91 km^{2} (6.92 sq mi)

Population (2018)
  - Total: 25,648
  - Density: 1,439/km^{2} (3,730/sq mi)
- Time zone: UTC+1 (CET)
  - Summer (DST): UTC+2 (CEST)
- Postal code: 62-100
- Area code: +48 67
- Car plates: PWA
- Website: www.wagrowiec.pl

Wągrowiec [vɔŋˈɡrɔvjɛt͡s] is a town in west-central Poland, 50 kilometres (31 miles) from both Poznań and Bydgoszcz. Since the 18th century, it has been the seat of a powiat. Administratively, it is attached to the Wągrowiec County of the Greater Poland Voivodeship. The town is situated in the middle of the ethnographic and historical region of Pałuki within Greater Poland and the Chodzież lake area (Pojezierze chodzieskie), on the river Wełna and its tributaries, Nielba and Struga, as well as on the shores of Durów Lake.

== Geography ==
The region around the town is rich in lakes. The town itself sits in the middle of Lake Durowskie (jezioro durowskie). The Wągrowiec municipal area boasts a rare attraction: two rivers, the Nielba and Wełna cross there, without commingling.

== Administration ==
Wągrowiec is constituted as a gmina miejska, or municipal commune. The city is also the seat of the rural commune of Wągrowiec, as well as of powiat of Wągrowiec.

Situated in the Greater Poland Voivodeship since 1999, Wągrowiec was previously a part of the Pila Voivodeship (1975–1998).

== Economy ==
Wągrowiec is a significant centre of the furniture industry. The largest enterprises include upholstered furniture manufacturers (including Polinova Polska , Wągrowieckie Fabryki Mebli and Tappol).

An important branch of the local economy is the metal and machinery industry. The town is home to companies engaged in the production of central heating boilers and steel structures (Faustmann), transport technology equipment and waste sorting facilities (Horstmann Technika), as well as industrial fittings for hydropower engineering (TB Hydro). Merx specialises in precision metal machining on numerically controlled machine tools . The railway sector is represented by a plant specialising in the modernisation of railway carriages (ZUT Wągrowiec). The town also hosts a facility belonging to the Continental Group (Benecke-Kaliko)Benecke-Kaliko, which produces upholstery materials for the automotive industry.

Other industrial sectors represented in the town include: • the food industry – including grain processing (Komplexmłyn), poultry hatcheries and spice production ; • the wood industry – including one of the largest coffin manufacturers in Poland (Lindner); • the printing and packaging industry .

== History ==
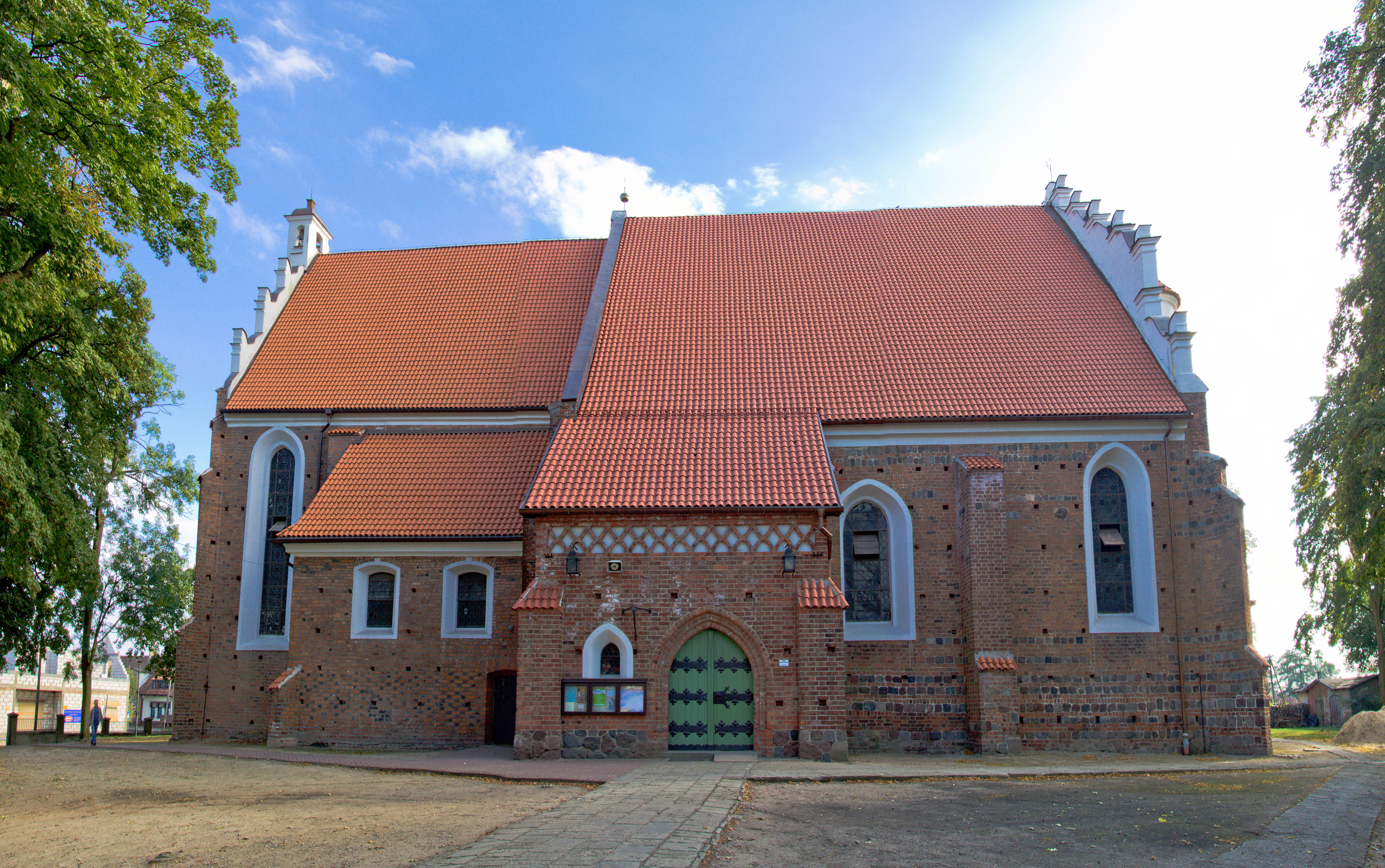
Gothic-Renaissance Saint James church

The town was founded as a small village called Prostynie by the Cistercian monks from the monastery in Łekno in 1319. In 1381, the name of Wągrowiec is mentioned for the first time in connection with the place. By that time, the town received city rights, most likely modelled after the Magdeburg Law. It was a private church town, administratively located in the Kcynia County in the Kalisz Voivodeship in the Greater Poland Province of the Kingdom of Poland. At the end of the 14th century, King Władysław II Jagiello gave the city the privileges of market and fair, and in 1396, the Cistercian monastery was established.

The town soon started to prosper. In the 15th and 16th centuries, it was an important centre of trade, commerce, and manufacturing (mostly textiles). In the 16th century, the Cistercians founded a school in Wągrowiec. This prosperity came to a halt during the Deluge in 1656, when the town was captured, pillaged and burnt by the forces of Charles X of Sweden.

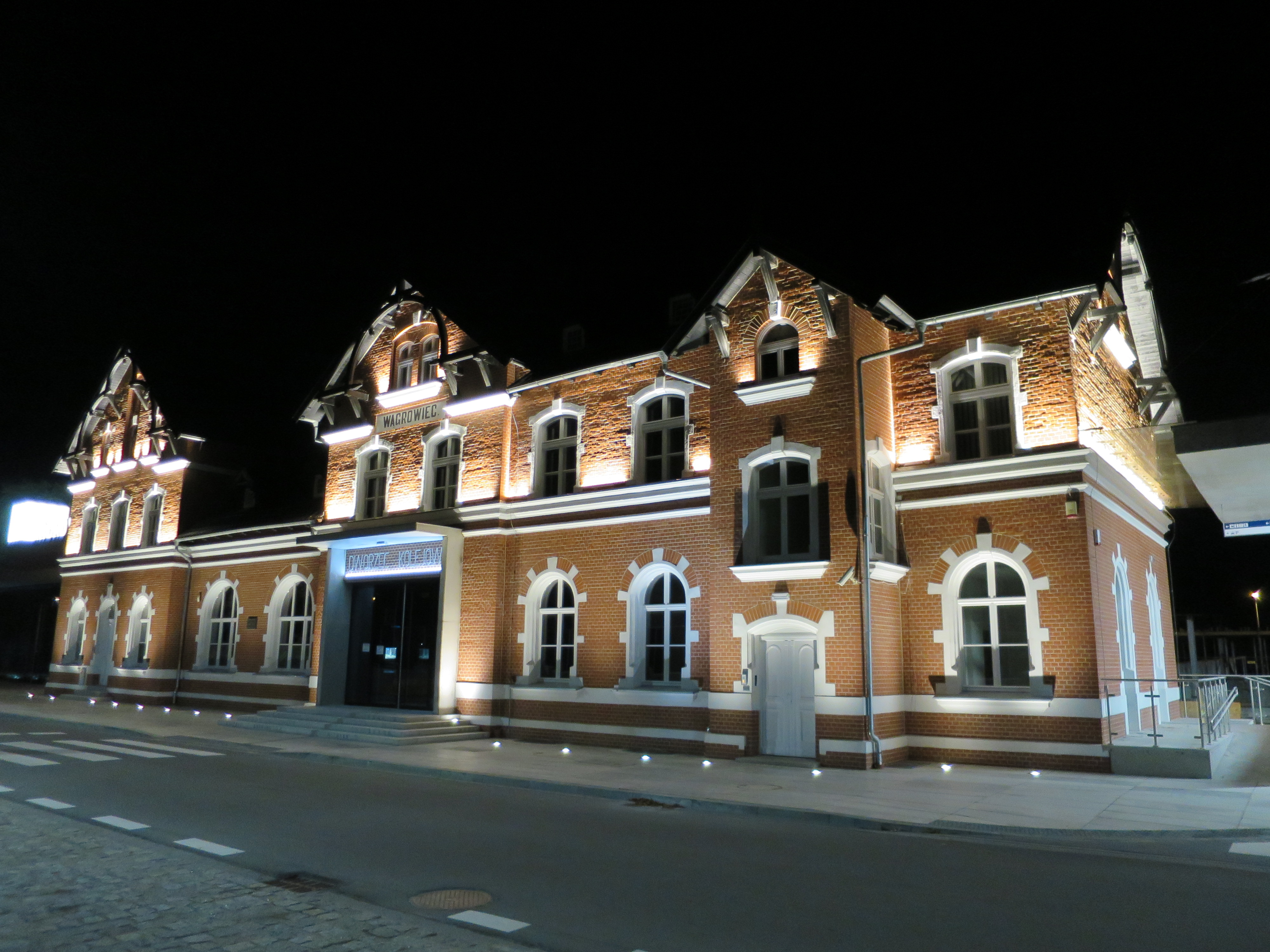
Wągrowiec train station at night

In 1793, after the Second Partition of Poland, Wągrowiec was annexed by the Kingdom of Prussia and was confiscated from the Cistercians in 1797. Initially it became part of the newly created province of South Prussia. After the successful Greater Poland uprising of 1806, it was regained by Poles and included within the short-lived Duchy of Warsaw. After the duchy's dissolution in 1815, Wągrowiec was again annexed by Prussia; this time it was made a part of the autonomous Grand Duchy of Poznań.

The populace was subjected to anti-Polish policies, including Germanisation. In 1835, the Cistercian monastic order was dissolved, and its property was confiscated by the Prussian authorities. Also in the 1830s, the Marianie secret resistance organization of Polish gymnasium students was formed in the town. On February 9, 1849, the autonomy of the Duchy was cancelled, and Wągrowiec — under the Germanized name of Wongrowitz—became part of the Province of Posen. In 1888, a railroad line linking Wągrowiec with Poznań was opened. In 1906–1907, local Polish school children protested against Germanisation, and the protests spread to nearby villages. German teachers used corporal punishment for the protests, especially flogging, and older students were expelled from the gymnasium.

In 1918, after World War I, Poland regained independence and Wągrowiec became the first town of northern Greater Poland to be liberated by the Poles during the Greater Poland Uprising. Polish inhabitants of Wągrowiec formed an insurgent unit, led by Włodzimierz Kowalski, a teacher from the nearby village of Czerlin, which fought in various battles in northern Greater Poland in 1919. The town was reintegrated with the Republic of Poland, and the local populace had to acquire Polish citizenship or leave the country. This led to a significant decline of ethnic Germans, whose number within the district decreased from 16,309 in 1910 to 8,401 in 1926 and further to 7,143 in 1934.

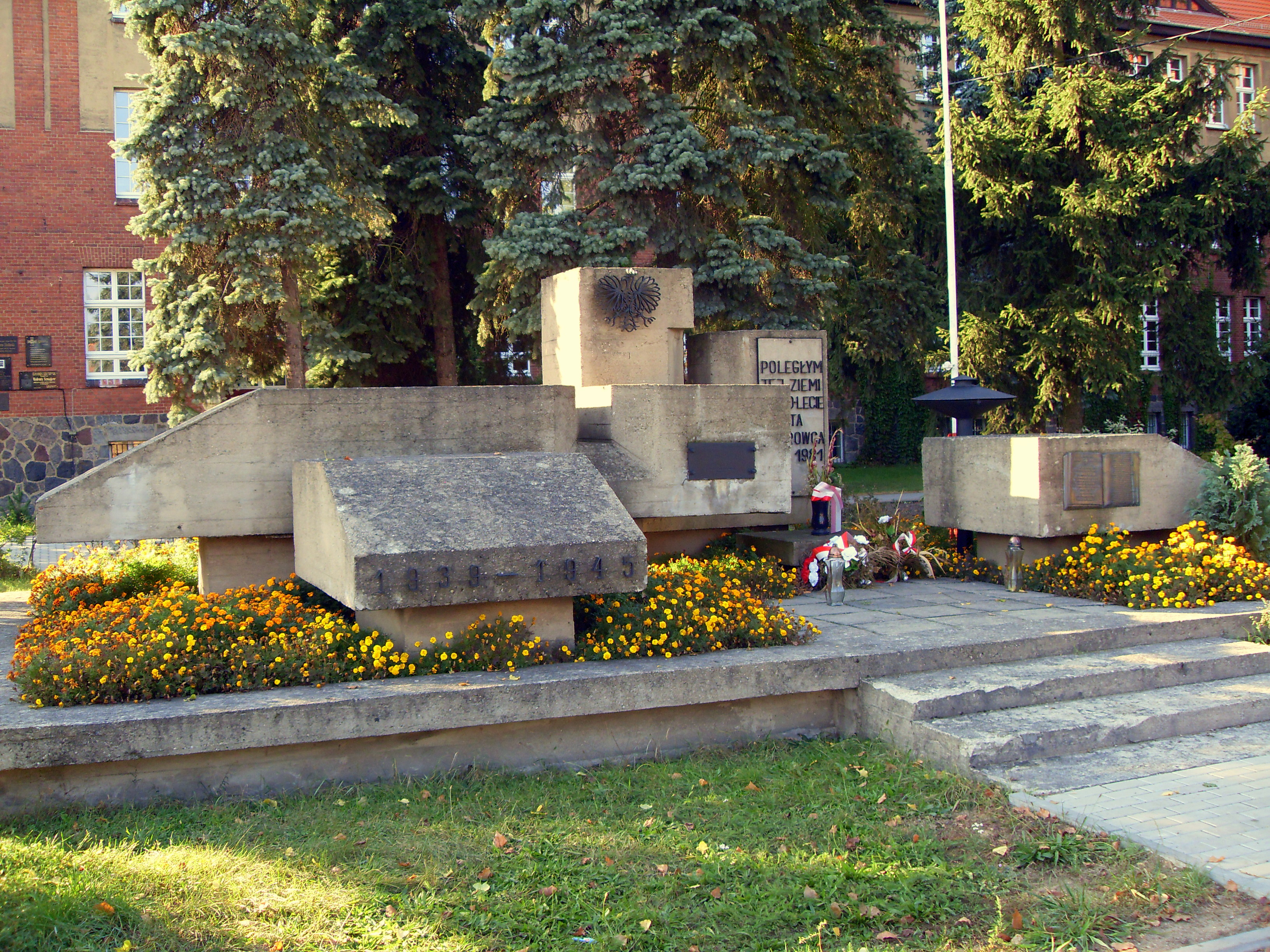
World War II memorial

Following the Molotov–Ribbentrop Pact and the end of the invasion of Poland, which started World War II in 1939, the town was annexed by Nazi Germany. On September 7, 1939, German troops carried out a massacre of eight Poles in Wągrowiec. During the German occupation, Wągrowiec was part of the German Reichsgau Wartheland and its name was changed by the Nazis to Eichenbrück. Germany operated a Nazi prison in the town. Poles from various settlements of the region were imprisoned in the town, and afterwards, on December 8, 1939, the Germans carried out a massacre of 107 Poles, including activists, participants of the uprising of 1918-1919, teachers, students, farmers, and merchants, in the forest near Bukowiec, north of Wągrowiec. Many Polish inhabitants were expelled to the more easterly areas of German-occupied Poland (General Government), as part of the implementation of Lebensraum policies. In August 1944, the Germans carried out mass arrests of local members of the Home Army, the leading Polish underground resistance organization. Wągrowiec was liberated in January 1945 and the expelled Polish inhabitants returned. Polish schooling resumed in February 1945.

== Notable architecture and other attractions ==
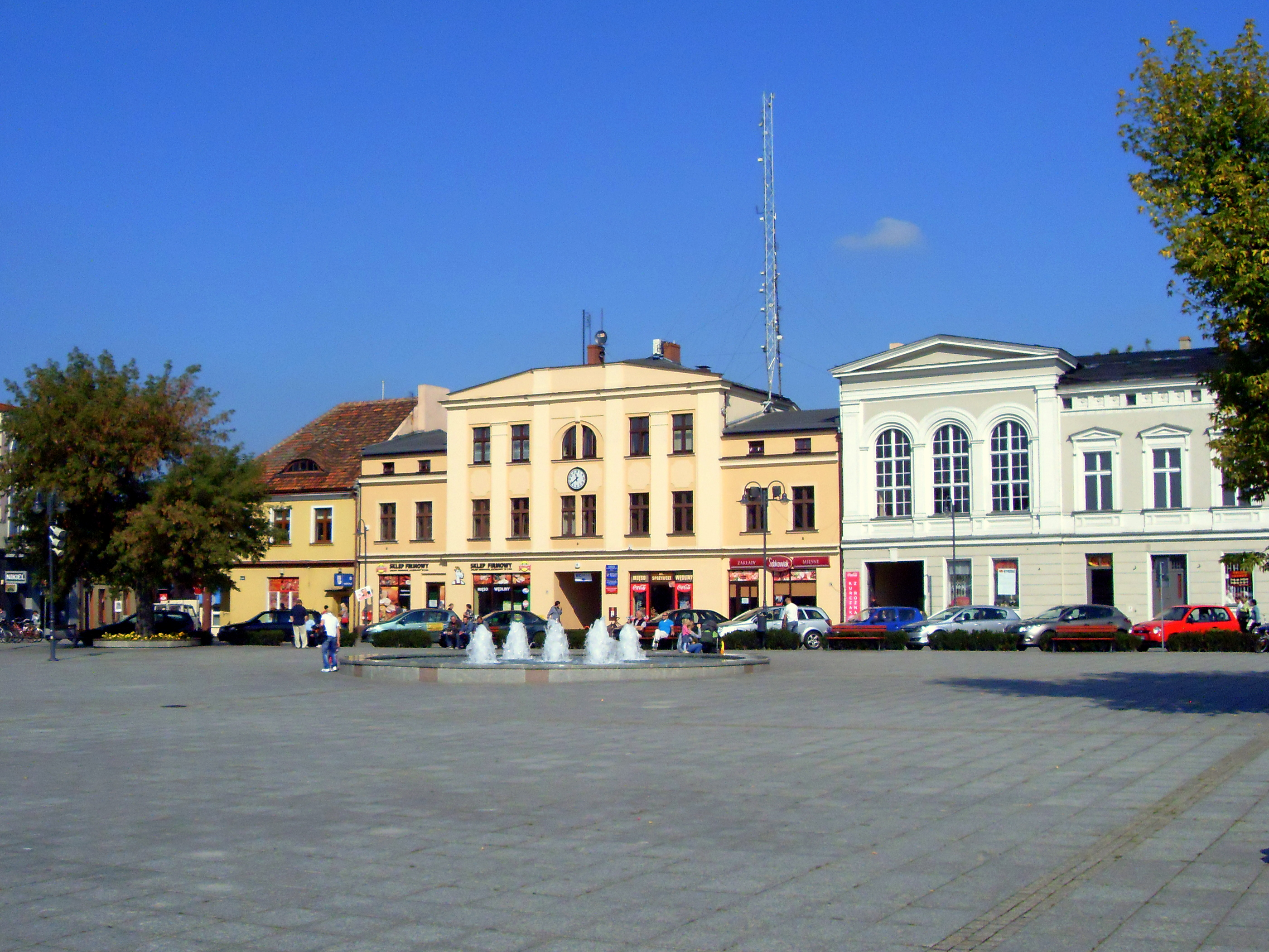
Rynek (Market Square)

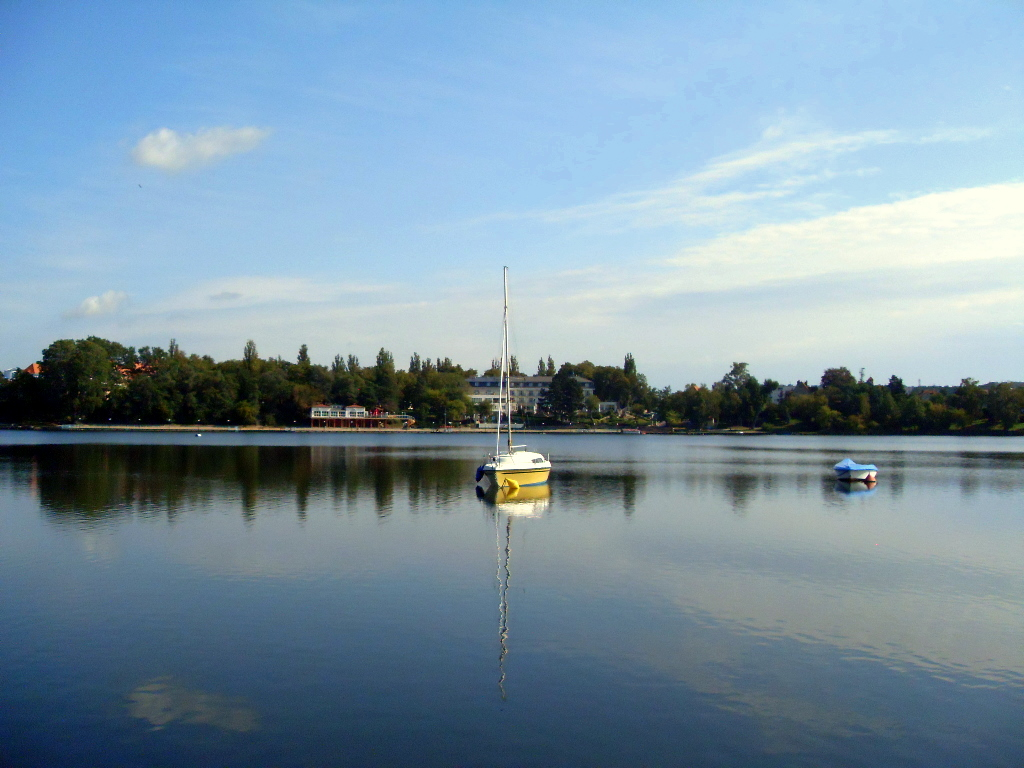
Lake Durowo

- The Gothic parish church with a belfry containing Renaissance polychromies dating to (1587)
- A Baroque Cistercian monastery (late 18th century)
- Late Baroque Cistercian church (late 18th century, burnt in 1945, rebuilt in 1946-1962)
- Opatówka abbey – the former seat of the Cistercian abbots, now a regional museum
- Pyramid of Lakiński – the pyramid-shaped tomb of a Polish captain who served in Napoleon's army
- The Dębina oak tree reserve with trees more than 200 years old and up to 40 metres tall, just outside the city limits
- A 5 floor residential high-rise with a large red-white painted mast on top

== Cuisine ==
Wągrowiec is one of the production sites of the Greater Poland liliput cheese (ser liliput wielkopolski), a traditional regional Polish cheese, protected as a traditional food by the Ministry of Agriculture and Rural Development of Poland.

== Sport ==
Nielba Wągrowiec is the town's professional sports club consisting of a football section and a handball section. The men's handball team plays in the second tier, but it also played in the top division, most recently in 2015. The men's football team competes in the lower professional and semi-professional leagues.

== Education ==
In Wągrowiec, there are five primary schools and five secondary schools, two vocational schools and two high schools and technical school. Two private universities opened branches in Wągrowiec, Gnieźnieńska Szkoła Wyższa Milenium and Poznańska Akademia Medyczna Nauk Stosowanych im. Księcia Mieszka I w Poznaniu.

== International relations ==
=== Twin towns – Sister cities ===
Wągrowiec is twinned with:

- Schönwalde-Glien, Brandenburg, Germany
- Adendorf, Lower Saxony, Germany
- Gyula, Hungary
- Krasnogorsk, Moscow Oblast, Russia
- Le Plessis-Trévise, Val-de-Marne, Île-de-France, France
- Burladingen, Baden-Württemberg, Germany
- Muggensturm, Baden-Württemberg, Germany

== Notable people ==
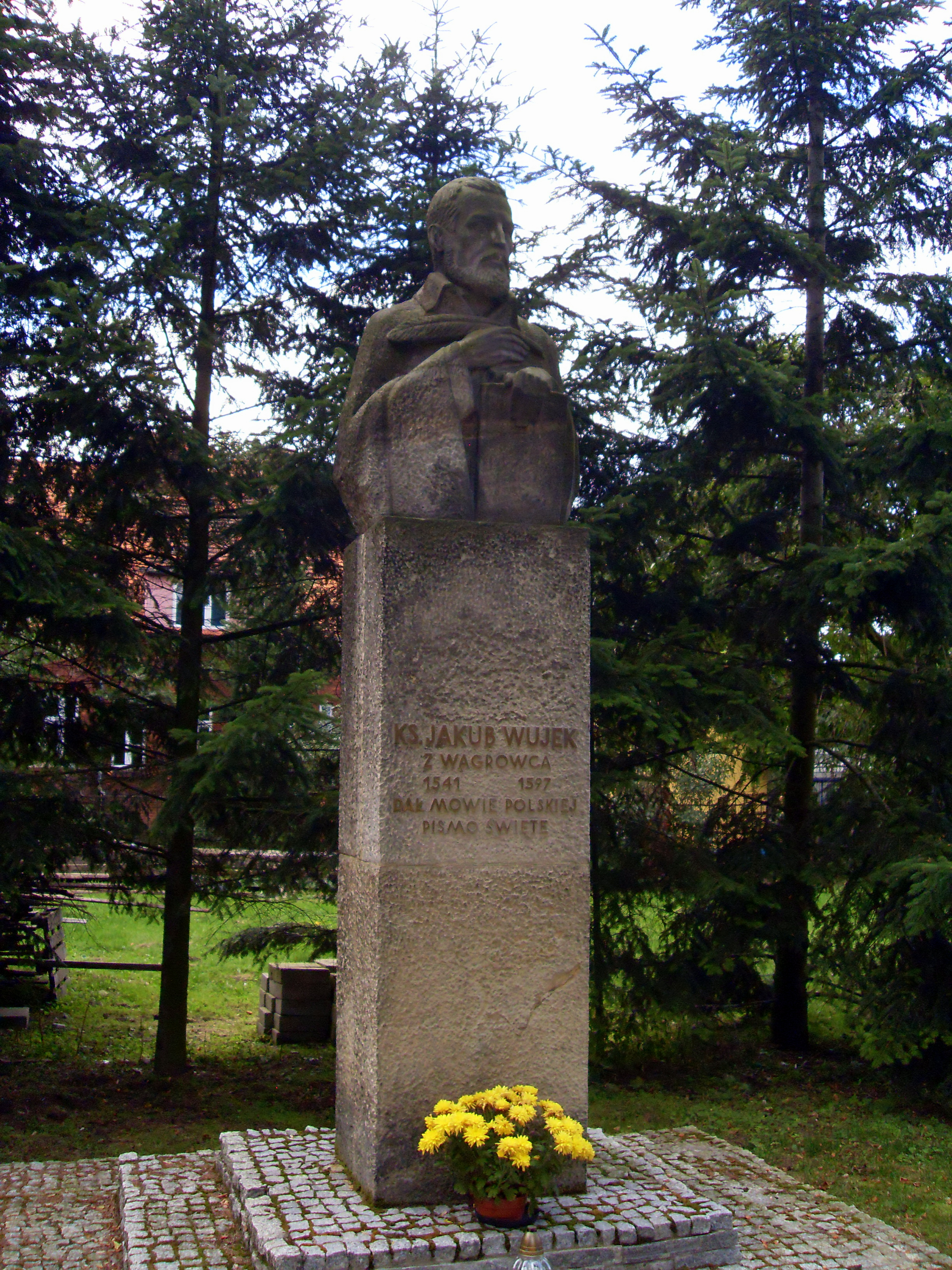
Monument of Jakub Wujek

- Jakub Wujek (1541–1597), author of one of the oldest translations of the Bible into the Polish language
- Adam of Wągrowiec (died 1629), organist, composer and Cistercian monk
- Karl Eduard Arnd (1802–1874), German historian and author
- Max Gerson, (1881–1959), German physician
- Stephan Rittau (1891–1942), Wehrmacht general
- Fritz Steuben (1898–1981), German author

== See also ==
- Kreis Wongrowitz – "county" during the Prussian administration
- Standesamt Wongrowitz
