= Saladin Schmitt =

German theatre director

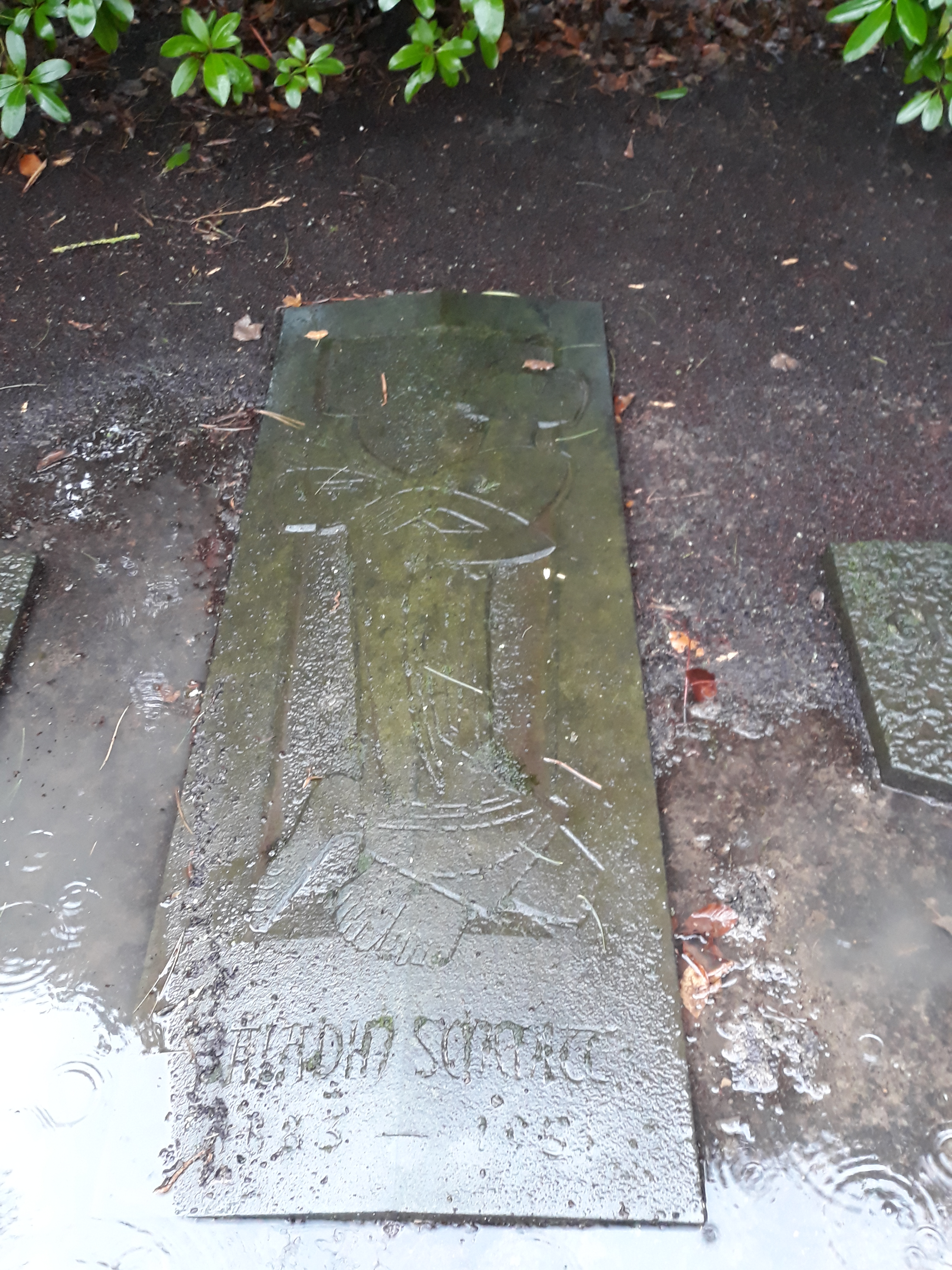
Schmitt's grave at the Friedhof Blumenstraße in Bochum.

Saladin Schmitt (18 September 1883 – 14 March 1951), real name Joseph Anton Schmitt, also active under the pseudonym Harald Hoffmann) was a German theatre director.

== Life ==
Born in Bingen am Rhein, Schmitt came from a family of wine merchants and mill owners who had lived on the lower Nahe for several generations. The eldest son was always called Saladin because, according to family legend, an ancestor had taken part in the Crusades. When his elder brother Saladin died, he took his first name.

After graduating from high school in Darmstadt in 1901, he studied German in Bonn and Berlin. In 1905, he received his doctorate from the Bonn Germanist and theatre scholar Berthold Litzmann with a thesis on Friedrich Hebbel. In addition to his studies, he took lessons as an actor and director under the pseudonym Harald Hoffmann at the Cologne Drama School under Max Martersteig as an actor and director.

In the 1906/1907 season, Schmitt worked as a dramaturge at the Stadttheater am Brausenwerth, after which he wrote mainly for the feuilleton of the Kölner Tageblatt. From 1913 to 1915, he was play director at the Stadttheater Freiburg, and during the First World War he directed the Deutsches Theater in Brussels.

From 1919 to 1949, Schmitt was the artistic director of the Schauspielhaus Bochum and from 1921 to 1935 also of the Deutsche Oper am Rhein. In Bochum, he established the reputation of the theatre with plays by Friedrich Schiller, William Shakespeare and other classical authors, but also with works of the younger generation, such as Heinrich Eduard Jacob, whose play Beaumarchais and Sonnenfels he successfully staged on 6 December 1919.

From 1937 he was vice-president and from 1943 president of the Deutsche Shakespeare-Gesellschaft. Schmitt was replaced as artistic director in 1949 when he tried to reinstate his former chief dramaturge Walter Thomas, who was considered controversial because of a National Socialist past; his removal was even demanded by a demonstration in front of the Rathaus Bochum.

Schmitt's homosexuality is first documented in his letters to Ernst Bertram, whom he met during their time studying together in Bonn. Their relationship ended when Bertram became firmly attached to Ernst Glöckner. Saladin Schmitt was open about his disposition. He knew numerous homosexuals and consorted with them. During the short engagement as head director in Freiburg he got into "considerable trouble" because of this.

Schmitt was a third cousin of Stefan George. After a first personal meeting in 1905, some of Schmitt's poems appeared in the Blätter für die Kunst between 1909 and 1919. A complete collection of the surviving poems as well as Schmitt's letters to George was published in 1964 by Robert Boehringer from George's estate. The following stanza from George's poem Secret Germany refers to Schmitt.

Den liebt ich der · mein eigenstes blut ·

Den besten gesang nach dem besten sang ..
Weil einst ein kostbares gut ihm entging
Zerbrach er lässig sein lautenspiel
Geduckt die stirn für den lorbeer bestimmt

Still wandelnd zwischen den menschen.

— Stefan George, Das neue Reich: Geheimes Deutschland
