= Frederick the Second =

1927 biography by Ernst Kantorowicz

- Front cover of the Georg Bondi editions
- Author: Ernst Kantorowicz
- Original title: Kaiser Friedrich der Zweite
- Translator: Emily Lorimer
- Language: German
- Subject: Medieval history
- Genre: Biography
- Publisher: Georg Bondi
- Publication date: 1927
- Publication place: Germany
- English publication date: 1931
- Pages: 650

Frederick the Second is a biography of Frederick II, Holy Roman Emperor, by the German-Jewish historian Ernst Kantorowicz. Originally published in German as Kaiser Friedrich der Zweite in 1927, it was "one of the most discussed history books in Weimar Germany", and has remained highly influential in the reception of Frederick II. The book depicts Frederick as a heroic personality, a messianic ruler who was "beseeltes Gesetz", the law given soul, but also a charismatic and calculating autocrat—"probably the most intolerant emperor that ever the West begot".

The book has courted controversy since its appearance for various reasons. Critics at the time of its publication objected to its lack of scholarly citations—though Kantorowicz subsequently published an additional volume detailing his sources—and to the book's apparent abandonment of the principles of documentary objectivity that characterised historical positivism. Since World War II, historians have debated the work's connection to Nazism and the broader nationalist milieu in Weimar Germany. Kantorowicz himself refused to approve the re-publication of Frederick the Second after the war on the grounds that it risked encouraging "outmoded nationalism".

== Context ==
The book was a product of Kantorowicz's association with the esoteric literary circle around Stefan George, and stands within a broader tradition of mythically inflected depictions of Frederick II that includes Friedrich Nietzsche's description of him as "the first European". The swastika on the front cover of the book's original German editions was itself a symbol of the George Circle, which they had adopted before and independently of the Nazi Party. Though Kantorowicz would deemphasise the connection, the book also served as background to his later 1957 work, The King's Two Bodies, which developed from a planned sequel concerning the "German interregnum" after Frederick's death.

== Synopsis ==
Frederick the Second presents Emperor Frederick as a heroic figure and early Renaissance man, "statesman and philosopher, politician and warrior, leader of armies and jurist, poet, diplomat, architect, zoologist, mathematician, the master of six or perhaps nine languages". He is a cosmopolitan "Roman German" who embodies the synthesis of the Roman spirit of universal dominion with the cultural and historical role of Germany, and "combines the triple culture of Europe ... of the Church, of the east and the Ancients". Campaigning in Jerusalem, Frederick studies the architecture of the Al-Aqsa Mosque and shows "unlimited admiration for the Arab intellect". Establishing his empire as a legal and bureaucratic state, he becomes lex animata and "high priest" of the law, turning the administration of justice into a mystical sacrament.

On the other hand, Kantorowicz says, Frederick was no "enlightened and tolerant potentate"—in fact he was "probably the most intolerant emperor that ever the West begot". Frederick terms himself the "God of vengeance who punishes the guilt of heretics to the second generation", and his Liber Augustalis begins with the proscription of heresy as treason punishable by death. At the Battle of Parma, "frightful necessity" drives him to a "reign of terror".

The book's account is florid and often exoticist. Kantorowicz frequently invokes an eclectic variety of literary references to enhance his depiction of Frederick, drawing especially on the medieval poetry of Dante and Parzival but also on classical Greek and Roman mythology. Frederick himself appears as a hybrid figure whose "mixed" identity Kantorowicz presents in highly positive terms. He is a monarch able to fulfil his contemporaries' desire to bring together "Muhammad and Christ, Kaiser and Khalif"; who, in a sense, "surrendered to the East". Frederick's government is itself "oriental" and autocratic, invoking but re-evaluating the concept of oriental despotism.

Upon his final excommunication in 1239, for Kantorowicz Frederick becomes at the same time a messianic figure and an Antichrist in the sense described by Nietzsche—proclaiming himself "the Hammer, the Doom of the World", he begins to construct a new church around himself. Frederick's "mysterious power ... sucked the whole globe into the vortex of his strife with Rome". With his death in 1250, however, the emperor's immense power immediately fades away, his plans unfulfilled. Kantorowicz concludes the book in a prophetic tone, pronouncing, "The greatest Frederick—he who his Volk neither grasped nor gratified—until today is not redeemed. 'He lives and lives not' ..."

== Reception and controversy ==
=== Weimar Germany ===
Frederick the Second was an immediate public success. Its first printing in March 1927 sold out by the end of the year, and 12,000 copies had been bought by the time the fourth edition appeared in 1936—a significant accomplishment during the Great Depression.

The book was originally published without footnotes or a list of sources, and was thus criticised for having an unclear scholarly basis. This was in fact a conscious decision: Stefan George had believed that academic historians tended to confuse the content of the works they studied with the scholarly infrastructure supporting their claims, which George felt distracted ordinary readers. In 1931, however, Kantorowicz issued an Ergänzungsband, or supplementary volume, containing a complete scholarly apparatus for the text.

Other critiques of Kantorowicz were more fundamental. Albert Brackmann, a prominent German medievalist and later Nazi propagandist, criticised Kantorowicz in a lengthy review essay published in 1929 for using "methodologically false means" to arrive at his conception of Frederick. Frederick the Second, Brackmann argued, proceeded from Kantorowicz's sentiments and subjective impressions rather than working from the objective evidence. Brackmann insisted, in contrast, that "one can write history neither as a pupil of George nor as a Catholic nor as a Protestant nor as a Marxist, but only as an individual in search of truth".

Kantorowicz responded to his critics at the seventeenth annual German Historical Conference, attended by 140 history professors and junior faculty, as well as 250 other participants, in April 1930. In his speech to the conference, he criticised the "colourless" writing of historical positivism and defended the necessity of writing history as a form of literature, using a wide range of non-documentary sources: even forgeries and technical formularies, he suggested, could shed light on the conditions of their time. History could not be written without preconceptions, and the task, he stated, was to defend the nation—though without "nationalistic tub-thumping".

=== Postwar reception ===
The reception of the book since World War II has been divided. After his emigration to the United States in 1938, Kantorowicz himself would distance his later work from Frederick the Second in what Conrad Leyser describes as a "conscious program of obfuscation", even—unsuccessfully—attempting to prevent its re-publication. After World War II he stated that the work was "out of date and runs the risk of encouraging an outmoded nationalism"—though he also rejected the description of the book by the Italian historian Ernesto Pontieri as a prototypical example of Nazism. A new German edition of the book appeared, in any case, immediately after Kantorowicz's death in 1963.

Subsequently, the German-American historian Felix Gilbert argued in 1988 that Frederick the Second was a "liberating" work, which overcame the "rigidification" of medieval history at the time and proved that research on the "ideas and values" that motivated medieval rulers could draw popular interest. The American medieval historian Robert E. Lerner, on the other hand, posited in 1991 that Kantorowicz's methodology may be seen as part of a general attack on the values of the Enlightenment, which manifested in the George circle as much as in Nazism.

In his 1991 Inventing the Middle Ages Norman Cantor gave perhaps the most far-reaching criticism of the work along with Kantorowicz's entire oeuvre, calling Kantorowicz's "Nazi credentials ... impeccable on every count except his race". Cantor's account has been widely criticized, however, described as "irresponsible misrepresentation" and "preposterous" by Lerner, "inappropriate" and "deeply regrettable" by the Cambridge medievalist David Abulafia, and "a tissue of falsehoods and half-truths" by Leyser.

Abulafia, in his own 1988 biography of Frederick, describes Kantorowicz's work as an "epic biography" that "combined scholarship about the past with prophecy about the future", mixing factual details about Frederick's life with "journeys of the imagination". Nevertheless, the book's critical Ergänzungsband may serve as a "permanent place of reference to scholars".

== Translation ==
The Anglo-Irish philologist Emily Lorimer was commissioned by Helen Waddell at the publishing firm Constable and Company in 1930 to prepare an English translation of the book, which appeared with Kantorowicz's approval the following year. Kantorowicz stated that Lorimer's translation was a "marvelous" reproduction of his writing style.

=== English editions ===
- Frederick the Second, 1194–1250. London: Constable and Co. 1931.
- Frederick the Second, 1194–1250. New York: Frederick Ungar Publishing Co. 1957.
- Frederick the Second: Wonder of the World, 1194–1250. London: Head of Zeus. 2019. ISBN 978-1789540833. Introduction by Dan Jones.
