= Max Kommerell =

German literary historian (1902–1944)

- Born: 25 February 1902; Münsingen, German Empire
- Died: 25 July 1944 (aged 42); Marburg, Nazi Germany
- Spouses: Eva Otto (m. 1931; div. 1936) Erika Franck (m. 1938)

Academic background
- Education: University of Marburg
- Thesis: Jean Pauls Verhältnis zu Rousseau ("Jean Paul's Relation to Rousseau") (1924)
- Doctoral advisor: Ernst Elster
- Influences: Stefan George

Academic work
- Discipline: Literary history
- School or tradition: George circle (1921–1930); Conservative Revolution
- Institutions: University of Frankfurt am Main (1930–1941); University of Marburg (1941–1944)

Max Kommerell (25 February 1902 – 25 July 1944) was a German literary historian, writer, and poet. A member of the Stefan George circle from 1921 to 1930, Kommerell was a prominent literary critic associated with the Conservative Revolutionary movement in the Weimar Republic and subsequently a leading intellectual in Nazi Germany and a member of the Nazi Party from 1941, though one of his works was banned by the Nazi government in 1943.

== Early life ==
Born on 25 February 1902 in Münsingen, Württemberg, Kommerell studied briefly at the University of Tübingen in 1919 before transferring to Heidelberg in 1920. There, Kommerell started a doctorate in German literature and attended lectures by Friedrich Gundolf, a close associate of the poet Stefan George. He became interested in the thought of the George circle, and after transferring again to the University of Marburg in 1921 he was introduced personally to Gundolf and George himself through a friend who worked there as an assistant of Friedrich Wolters, another member of the circle. George nicknamed Kommerell "Maxim" and "the Smallest One" (das Kleinste) on account of his short stature. He completed his doctorate in 1924 with a thesis on the Romantic novelist Jean Paul.

== Career ==
=== George circle ===
Under George's influence, Kommerell adopted a position of elitist disdain for democracy and support for irrationalism and German nationalism, becoming identified with the Conservative Revolutionary movement. In 1928, Kommerell published a programmatic work, Der Dichter als Führer in der deutschen Klassik ("The Poet as Leader in German Classicism"), embodying the views he had received from George. The critical theorist Walter Benjamin reviewed the book in 1930 in an article titled "Wider ein Meisterwerk" ("Against a Masterpiece"). Though he described the work as "amazing" and betokening an "extraordinary precision and boldness of ... vision", Benjamin attacked Kommerell for what he saw as repetitive images of violence and service to a dangerous nationalist ideology.

=== Later studies ===
After clashing with Ernst Morwitz, another member of the George circle, in 1929, Kommerell broke with George entirely in 1930, aiming to establish his independence from the poet's influence. He completed his habilitation at the University of Frankfurt am Main in the same year and taught there throughout the 1930s; his first lecture at Frankfurt concerned Hugo von Hofmannsthal, a rival of George, whom Kommerell praised as a poet who was not a "leader". He criticised George's "liturgical pathos", which he compared to "Philistinism dressed up as spirit".

In 1933, Kommerell published a monograph on Jean Paul, titled simply Jean Paul, which became one of the most influential studies of that writer. Contrasting Paul's trenchant humour with the artistic sensibility of Johann Wolfgang von Goethe, Kommerell suggested that Paul's spirit may have represented the beginning of a general "crisis of art" in modernity. Both writers were members of the bourgeoisie, but in Goethe, Kommerell argued, "the bourgeoisie is still a class [Stand]"—in Jean Paul it is "only in disorder [Mißstand]". Paul's humour represented a condition in which exterior life, formerly a realm of aesthetic potential, had fallen into "pettiness".

Kommerell failed to secure a chair at Frankfurt, and returned to Marburg after he was offered a professorship there by the Reich Education Ministry in September 1941. He joined the Nazi Party in 1941, likely after originally applying in 1939, and served as a member of the Sturmabteilung (SA). Nevertheless, in 1943 the Nazi government banned an anti-Soviet drama by Kommerell, Die Gefangenen ("The Prisoners"), for its "depressive character", perceiving in the play a critique of the German system itself.

=== Poetry ===
Though it has been overshadowed by his works of literary criticism, Kommerell also wrote poetry of his own. Between 1929 and 1944, he published seven compilations of poems and one novel. His final publication, a poem collection titled Mit gleichsam chinesischem Pinsel ("With a Sort of Chinese Brush", 1944), is heavily influenced by Chinese aesthetics.

== Personal life ==
Kommerell's sexuality was ambiguous: in 1919, he remarked that he had "actually never loved girls but rather only boys"; though he stated that he did not engage in gay sexual practices, he opposed any moral censure of them. Within the George circle he became attached to another male member, a student named Johann Anton. Kommerell and Anton lived together in Marburg from 1923 on. Following Kommerell's departure from the circle in 1930, however, Anton became distraught, writing to Kommerell that he was "threatened by something like insanity". Anton committed suicide on 25 February 1931. Kommerell went on to marry two women: Eva Otto from 1931 to 1936, and Erika Franck in 1938, with whom he had one daughter, Yvonne.

== Death and influence ==
Kommerell died of cancer in Marburg on 25 July 1944. Following World War II, his conservative positions fell out of favour in academic literary history. He is remembered primarily through Benjamin's critique of his work and his engagement with Martin Heidegger, whose analysis of Friedrich Hölderlin was once described by Kommerell to Hans-Georg Gadamer as a "productive train-wreck". He was a formative influence on the historian and critic Arthur Henkel (1915–2005). The historian Robert E. Norton describes Kommerell as "arguably the most original philosophical literary critic" of twentieth-century Germany, behind only Benjamin; the philosopher Giorgio Agamben similarly calls Kommerell "certainly the greatest German critic of the twentieth century after Benjamin".
