= Ernst Bertram =

German Germanist and writer (1884–1957)

Ernst August Bertram (27 July 1884 – 3 May 1957) was a German professor of German studies at the University of Cologne, but also a poet and writer who was close to the George-Kreis and the lyricist Stefan George.

== Life ==
Bertram was born the son of Evangelical Lutheran Church overseas merchant Ernst Bertram and his wife Johanne Müller in Elberfeld (today Wuppertal). He passed the Abitur in the spring of 1903 at the Wilhelm-Dörpfeld-Gymnasium in his hometown. Bertram then studied German history of literature, modern history of art and philosophy in Berlin, Munich and Bonn. On 9 July 1907, he received his doctorate from the University of Bonn with a dissertation written under Berthold Litzmann on Adalbert Stifter's novella technique.

The year 1906 was marked by two central encounters for him: on the one hand, he found access to Stefan George through Saladin Schmitt. On the other hand, he met his partner Ernst Glöckner at the beginning of the summer semester. Both understood their love as a "great mystery" and celebrated their Du-Tag with Beethoven's music and Thomas Mann reading. George's courtship of Glöckner led to a love triangle because Glöckner clung to Bertram.

In terms of works, various essayistic writings on Hugo von Hofmannsthal, Stefan George, Theodor Fontane, Gustave Flaubert, Conrad Ferdinand Meyer and Thomas Mann followed. Bertram was a close friend of the latter for a long time and even became godfather to his daughter Elisabeth.

In 1918, Bertram's book Nietzsche - Versuch einer Mythologie was published, with which he quickly became known in literary circles. Mann's preserved letters to Bertram (256 documents in the Deutsches Literaturarchiv Marbach) as well as Mann's Betrachtungen eines Unpolitischen (Reflections of a Nonpolitical Man), which appeared almost at the same time, bear witness to his influence on Thomas Mann during that time. The writing of these letters was accompanied by an intensive exchange of ideas. In 1919 Bertram was appointed lecturer at the University of Bonn, and in 1922 he received a professorship at the University of Cologne. In his poems in the Nornenbuch, he emphasised the inequality of peoples.

After the seizure of power by the Nazis, Bertram greeted the Nazi book burnings on 10 May 1933 with consecration verses: "Verwerft, was euch verwirrt, / Verfemt, was euch verführt! / Was reinen Willens nicht wuchs, / In die Flammen mit was euch bedroht“." (Reject what confuses you, / Condemn what seduces you! / What pure will did not grow, / Into the flames with what threatens you".) The extent to which Bertram distanced himself inwardly and outwardly from National Socialism over the next twelve years cannot be conclusively assessed.

In September 1945, an internal denazification commission at the university concluded that Bertram was "proven to be a man who belongs to the nourishers of National Socialism". In 1946, Bertram was removed from his teaching post, and in 1950, a review of the denazification process resulted in his rehabilitation and emeritus status. He was no longer active as a university lecturer.

Bertram also appeared as a poet throughout his life. Most of his volumes of poetry (including The Rhine, Strasbourg, Patenkinderbuch, Griecheneiland) were published by Insel Verlag. In addition, he wrote various so-called Spruchdichtungen, i.e. aphorisms that follow one another and stand in a certain context (Der Wanderer von Milet, Sprüche aus dem Buch Arja, Deichgrafensprüche), which in this form have a unique position in the German literature of the 20th century.

Bertram died in Cologne at the age of 72.

== Honours ==
- 1939: Treuedienst-Ehrenzeichen in Silber, 2. Stufe
- 1939: Joseph-von-Görres-Preis
- 1943: Rheinischer Literaturpreis
- 1953: Wuppertaler Kunstpreis

== Works ==
- Zur sprachlichen Technik der Novellen Adalbert Stifters. Ruhfus, Dortmund 1907
- Gedichte. Insel, Leipzig 1913
- Nietzsche. Versuch einer Mythologie. Bondi, Berlin 1918
- Straßburg. Ein Gedichtkreis. Insel, Leipzig 1920
- Zwei Gedichte aus dem unveröffentlichten Buch der Rhein. Privatdruck (?), Weilburg 1921
- Rheingenius und Génie du Rhin. F. Cohen, Bonn 1922
- Das Nornenbuch. Leipzig, Insel 1925
- Beethovens Bild. Rede zur Beethoven-Gedächtnisfeier. Oskar Müller, Cologne 1927
- Von deutschem Schicksal, Gedichte. Insel Leipzig 1933
- Wartburg. Spruchgedichte. Leipzig, Insel 1933
- Deutsche Gestalten. Fest- und Gedenkreden. Insel, Leipzig 1934
- Griecheneiland. Insel, Leipzig 1934
- Michaelsberg. Insel, Leipzig 1935
- Das weiße Pferd. Insel, Leipzig 1936
- Von der Freiheit des Wortes. Leipzig, Insel 1936 (Insel-Bücherei 485/1)
- Sprüche aus dem Buch Arja. Leipzig, Insel 1938
- Persische Spruchgedichte. Leipzig, Insel 1944 (Insel-Bücherei 87/3)
- Hrabanus. Aus der Michaelsberger Handschrift. Leipzig, Insel 1939
- Konradstein. Erzählung. Insel, Wiesbaden 1951
- Moselvilla. Flavus an Veranius. Bachem (commission), Cologne 1951
- Prosperos Heimkehr. Eine Gedenkmusik zur Wiederkehr von William Shakespeares Todestag . Auer, Donauwörth 1951
- Der Wanderer von Milet. Insel, Wiesbaden 1956
- Möglichkeiten. Ein Vermächtnis, edited by Hartmut Buchner. Neske, Pfullingen 1958 (mit Bibliographie Ernst Bertram S. 273–282)
