= George-Kreis =

German literary society

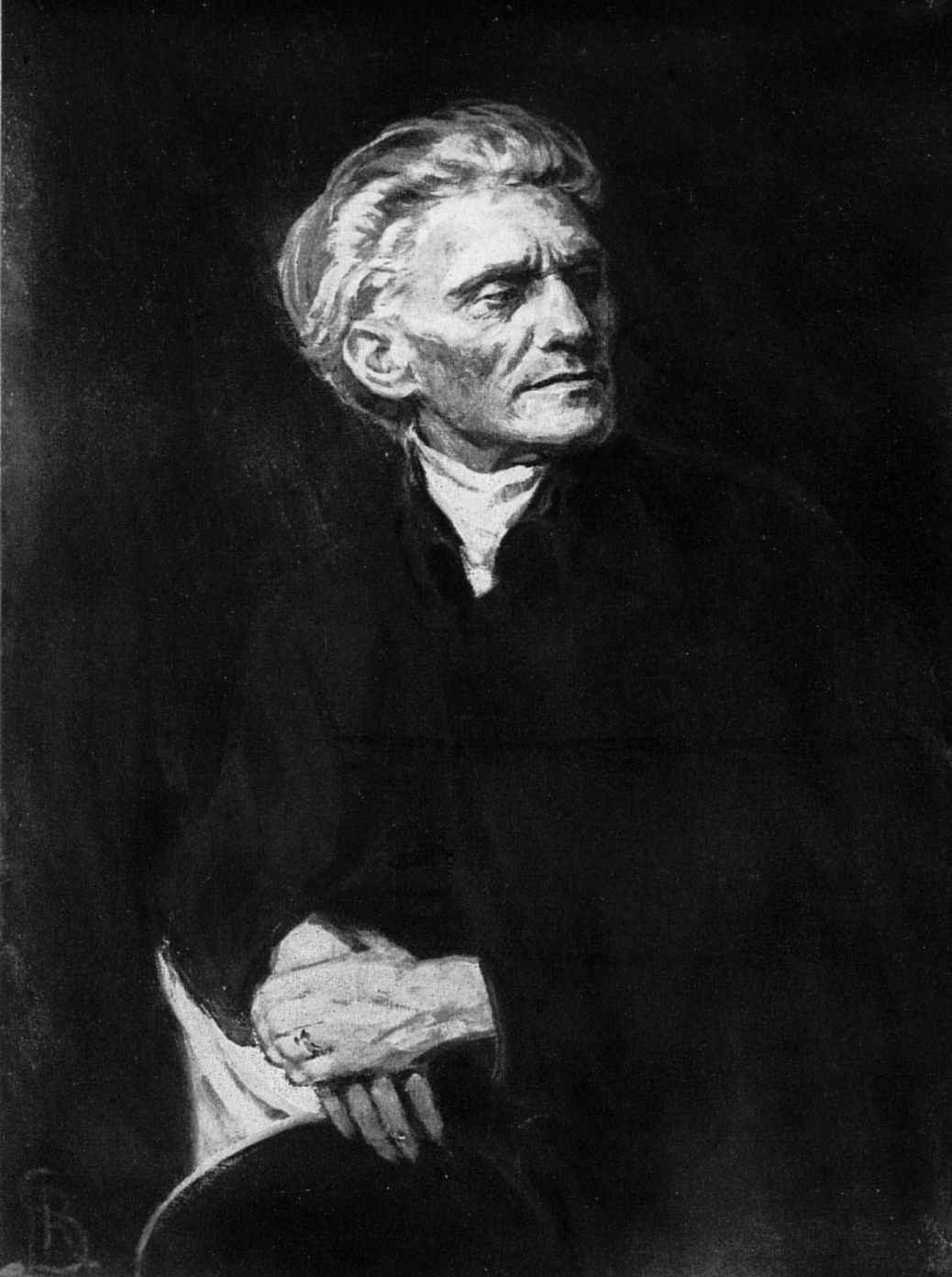
Stefan George, portrait by Reinhold Lepsius

The George-Kreis (German pronunciation: [ɡeːˈɔʁ.gə kʁaɪ̯s]; George Circle) was an influential German literary group centred on the charismatic author Stefan George. Formed in the late 19th century, when George published a new literary magazine called Blätter für die Kunst ("Journal for the Arts"), the group featured many highly regarded writers and academics. In addition to sharing cultural interests, the circle reflected mystical and political themes within the sphere of the Conservative Revolutionary movement. The group disbanded when George died in December 1933.

== Formation ==
George began publishing poems modelled on French Symbolism in the 1890s. In 1892, he created the Blätter für die Kunst magazine, mainly to publish his own works and those by his admirers. Among his followers were Karl Wolfskehl and, a little later, Alfred Schuler and Ludwig Klages, both members of the Munich Cosmic Circle, as well as the Polish author Waclaw Rolicz-Lieder and the Dutch poet Albert Verwey. George assembled talented young men in an order-like confraternity; he himself maintained a passionate friendship with the author and literary scholar Friedrich Gundolf whom he met in 1899.

About 1902, George encountered 14-year-old Maximilian Kronberger in Munich; when the adolescent died of meningitis two years later, he was "idealized [by George] to the point of proclaiming him a god, following his death... the cult of 'Maximin' became an integral part of the George circle's practice..." The Maximin-Erlebnis provided George with inspiration for his work in subsequent years. Robert Boehringer, head of the Boehringer Ingelheim pharmaceutical company, joined the circle in 1905; he later became George's literary executor. Still in 1919, George befriended the young historian Ernst Kantorowicz and guided him to write his biography of Emperor Frederick II.

The Circle presented itself as an assembly of young elitist writers with George as undisputed head, mentor and saviour, similar to the esoteric circle around Albert von Schrenck-Notzing or other poet collectives at that time, and already mocked by contemporaries like Otto Julius Bierbaum. Later the "Bohemian countess" Fanny zu Reventlow, acquainted with the Munich Cosmic Circle, satirized George's friends for their melodramatic actions and views. According to the sociologist Max Weber, the selected group gathering around a charismatic mastermind took on traits of a sect.

== Structure and topics ==
The teacher-student ratio formed a constituting characteristic of the group, with George and a small number of ingenious beings, such as Karl Wolfskehl and Ludwig Klages, empowered to create their own art by divine inspiration. These blessed minds aimed at depicting the world by creating a poetic language that recognizes and constitutes the archetypical perception. They should be differentiated from those who only could receive inspiration in a derivative form, similar to the concept of Mimesis and Dionysian imitatio, and were dependent on spiritual guidance. Hugo von Hofmannsthal, initially one of George's admirers, later criticized these ideas as "hypocritical" and only faking a cognitive penetration of the whole.

The members of the homophile fellowship were associated by the aesthetic experience discovering George's poetry and their veneration of his life and work. Ritual meetings were held by an enclave of the elect: in the first reunion after World War I, at Pentecost 1919, George assembled 'twelve disciples' in Heidelberg, where Ernst Kantorowicz was solemnly accepted as a member of the community. After the Nazi seizure of power and George's death in 1933, several attempts to continue the Circle's traditions ultimately failed.

Stefan George aimed at creating a mystical, anti-modernist society, distinguished by its aesthetic superiority and within the framework of clear hieriachies. He adopted the idea of an idealistic 'Secret Germany' (Geheimes Deutschland) conspiration, a vision of inner entity as coined by the cultural philosophers Paul de Lagarde and Julius Langbehn. Geheimes Deutschland was also the title of a poem published in George's late work Das Neue Reich ("The New Empire") in 1928, in which he proclaimed a new form of an intellectual and spiritual aristocracy, to some extent obliged to Schiller's On the Aesthetic Education of Man. The transfiguration of a 'German mind' below the surface of a real-existing, profane German nation state has later been described as a model for the conservative German resistance to Nazism, culminating in the 20 July plot. Indeed Alexander and Berthold von Stauffenberg had become acquainted with the Circle in 1923 through Albrecht von Blumenthal, shortly afterwards also their brother Claus who became a great admirer of George's work. According to some sources, at his execution he spoke his last words, "Es lebe das Geheime Deutschland!" ("Long live the Secret Germany!") On the other hand, the Circle's anti-civilizing attitudes have also been identified as preparing the ground for the rise of Nazism by Marxist scholars such as Bruno Frei or writers like Walter Benjamin, Theodor W. Adorno, and Thomas Mann.

== Notable members ==
- Albrecht von Blumenthal
- Robert Boehringer
- Kurt Breysig
- Ludwig Derleth
- Paul Gérardy
- Percy Gothein
- Friedrich Gundolf
- Henry von Heiseler
- Ernst Kantorowicz
- Hugo Marcus
- Ludwig Klages
- Oskar Kohnstamm
- Max Kommerell
- Ernst Morwitz
- Edgar Salin
- Alfred Schuler
- The von Stauffenberg brothers, Claus, Alexander, and Berthold
- Ludwig Thormaehlen
- Berthold Vallentin
- Karl Gustav Vollmoeller
- Karl Wolfskehl
- Friedrich Wolters
