= Hans-Jürgen von Blumenthal =

German aristocrat and Army officer (1907–1944)

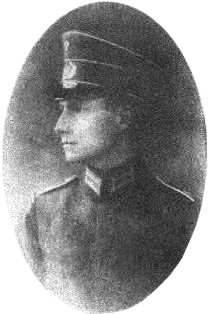
- Born: 23 February 1907; Potsdam, Kingdom of Prussia, German Empire
- Died: 13 October 1944 (aged 37); Plötzensee Prison, Berlin, Nazi Germany
- Cause of death: Execution by hanging
- Military career
- Branch: German Army
- Service years: 1935–1944
- Rank: Major
- Conflicts: Second World War

Hans-Jürgen Graf von Blumenthal (23 February 1907 – 13 October 1944) was a German aristocrat and Army officer in the Second World War who was executed by the Nazi regime for his role in the 20 July plot to assassinate Adolf Hitler.

== Biography ==
Hans-Jürgen was born in Potsdam, the son of Count Hans XII von Blumenthal (b. 1869) and his wife, Countess Melanie von der Schulenburg (1875–1953). He was christened Hans-Jürgen Adam Ludwig Oscar Leopold Bernard Arthur. His father, a colonel in the Prussian Army, had been wounded in the First World War, during which he served as military governor of the Belgian district of Neufchâteau.

The Blumenthal family, who had lost everything in the hyperinflation, moved to Neustrelitz in 1926. Educated at the Potsdam Gymnasium until 1928, followed by the Realgymnasium there, Blumenthal studied law and economics for two years at the University of Königsberg and the Ludwig-Maximilians-Universität München. He was a close friend of the eldest son of the last Crown Prince of Prussia, Prince Wilhelm of Prussia, to the extent that people said they behaved like twins.

At a young age he was a leading light of Der Stahlhelm, a right-wing and monarchist paramilitary organization formed after the end of the First World War for men who had served in the war, later opened to military men in general. Blumenthal edited the Stahlhelm newsletter until the Nazis took over the Association in 1935. He was an instructor in the "covert" army. In 1928, he was approached by his cousin the First World War hero Paul Emil von Lettow-Vorbeck with a proposal to form a common front between the German National People's Party and the Stahlhelm against the rise of National Socialism. The result was the so-called "Vorbeck-Blumenthal Pact".

In 1930, Graf Hans-Jürgen went on a three-month debating trip to the United States, including a visit to Columbia University. At about this time, he began taking an interest in the question of how to establish international peace and the possible unification of Europe. In 1931 at the Stahlhelm's "Potsdam Day", he and Prince Wilhelm met Hitler; both found him unsympathetic. In close circles, von Blumenthal referred to Hitler as "Emil". He had at first been an enthusiastic Nazi and became a Sturmbannführer (equivalent to a Major) in the Sturmabteilung (SA), but distanced himself from the Nazis more and more. His mother said he developed a "glowing hatred" of Hitler. He narrowly missed being killed during the Night of the Long Knives, perhaps because he was often at Göring's table and, through Prince Wilhelm, knew Mussolini's daughter Countess Ciano.

In 1935, after finishing his studies, Graf Hans-Jürgen went back to Neustrelitz, where he joined the 48th Infantry Regiment as a second lieutenant. In December 1936, he was promoted to lieutenant. In the army he remade the acquaintance of his childhood friend, Mertz von Quirnheim, and came into contact with other members of the German Resistance such as Hans Oster.

In the summer of 1938, Graf Hans-Jürgen became a company commander and had a position for two months at the War School in Munich. In that same year he wrote a contribution for the illustrated book for boys Wir Soldaten ("We Soldiers") but it is impossible to tell which piece was written by him. As he was writing his contribution to the book, he was already conspiring against Hitler. He had come to accept the view, common among the nobility, that the war was contrary to Germany's interests.

It was still well before the Sudeten Crisis and the invasion of Czechoslovakia that Graf Hans-Jürgen became a member of the German Resistance. A group of officers led by General Beck was opposed to war, and it was not difficult to foresee Hitler's intentions. Beck and his followers, Hans Oster and Erwin von Witzleben, planned a coup d'etat. The idea was for a storm-party of officers, including Graf Hans-Jürgen, to march into the Reich Chancellery, overcome the resistance of any SS guards found there, and arrest Hitler. However, the policy of appeasement towards Hitler espoused by the British Prime Minister Chamberlain led the conspirators to conclude that the planned coup had no future.

In August 1939, Graf Hans-Jürgen became a captain. He kept contact with the Resistance, based in the Abwehr under Admiral Canaris. War broke out, and on 9 September Graf Hans-Jürgen married Cornelia von Kries, née Schnitzler, a 34-year-old divorcée. Her first husband, Otto von Kries, by whom she had a daughter, would die at Leningrad in 1941. Her mother was a Borsig, a family of industrialists whose locomotive works in Berlin were among the largest enterprises in the country.

From September 1939 to May 1940, during the so-called Phoney War, Graf Hans-Jürgen was based at Saarbrücken in command of a machine-gun company. When this blissful calm ended, he took part in the offensive in Alsace, but in July his regiment was transferred to Tomaszew in central Poland, close to Warsaw, nearer to the new Soviet frontier, where in spite of his junior rank he took command of a battalion.

Graf Hans-Jürgen led his battalion to the gates of Kiev, where in July 1941 he was badly wounded by a dumdum bullet, his right arm rendered useless. He was in the army hospital in Leipzig until December 1942. His only son, Hubertus, was born in May 1942.

By this time, he was once again actively collaborating with the German Resistance.

After his recovery, he joined the Führer Reserve in Berlin and worked at the General War Office. There he got to know other opponents of the regime and introduced Mertz von Quirnheim to Count Claus von Stauffenberg, who was an intimate friend of Graf Hans-Jürgen's cousin Albrecht von Blumenthal. The latter had introduced Stauffenberg to the mystical poet Stefan George, from whose circle other conspirators were drawn. Furthermore, in the late 1930s Dietrich Bonhoeffer had operated an underground seminary for training Confessing Church pastors at Albrecht's estate at Schlönwitz.

In April 1943 Graf Hans-Jürgen was promoted to Major. He was the liaison officer between the Berlin Group and the Stettin High Command, Army District II, and was thus closely involved in the planning of the 20 July Plot of 1944. In his book Geist der Freiheit (1956), Eberhard Zeller wrote:

It is known that in the weeks before 20 July, Major Hans-Jürgen von Blumenthal was frequently driven to Stauffenberg in the evening. His driver waited for him – he went in fatigues [Trainingsanzug] – to an appointed place close to the Barracks at Düppel, which was close to where his department (General Weidemann) was supposed to have been off the Bendlerstrasse.

Elsewhere Zeller mentions that he worked in the department of Colonel Siegfried Wagner and which gave him contact with Goerdeler.

On the day Stauffenberg planted his abortive bomb, Graf Hans-Jürgen was on duty at OKH in the Bendlerstrasse. It was his task to control the messages which were to mobilize Operation Valkyrie in favour of the coup. As his name was at the top of the duty roster, he was the first to be identified as a conspirator. He evaded capture but could not get out of the building. He spent the night under an archway from where he witnessed the execution of Stauffenberg, Olbricht and his friend Mertz von Quirnheim.

He spent the weekend with his family at Kümmernitz in the West Prignitz, where he took the inexplicable fall of a mirror from the wall as a bad omen. The next day, 23 July 1944, he was arrested by three members of the Gestapo, who appeared in a car and took him away without his being able to say goodbye to his wife, who was thereafter unable to communicate with him. This all took place within half an hour. Between then and his trial before the German "People's Court" (Volksgerichtshof) and immediate execution by hanging at Plötzensee Prison on 13 October 1944, is almost unknown, apart from the slender details mentioned in his last letter to his wife. The sentence was as follows: 'In the name of the German people: Georg Schulze Buttger, Hans Jurgen Count Blumenthal, Roland von Hosslin and Friedrich Scholz Babisch, knew well beforehand of the planned betrayal of 20 July. They revealed nothing and thus allowed the plot to come to maturity. Thus they are forever without honour, jointly guilty of the heaviest betrayal known to history. They stand together as traitors with the assassin Count von Stauffenberg. With him they betrayed everything that we are, and for which we fight. They betrayed the sacrifices of our soldiers, betrayed the People, the Fuhrer and the Reich. They had a part in a betrayal which would have delivered us, defenceless, to our mortal enemies. For this they are sentenced to death.'

However, Zeller goes on:

...von Blumenthal came from the Potsdam Tradition, his father had been a tutor to the Hohenzollerns, but in the opinion of F. W. Heinz, the former editor of the Stahlhelm, from the beginning he had viewed the German nation's pact with Hitler as a misfortune, an opinion which grew ever stronger and made him increasingly restless as the years passed. He was close to Dohnanyi and Oster, and a childhood friend of Albrecht Mertz von Quirnheim. We know from eyewitnesses to his interrogation that he did not reveal the names of his accomplices.

In Fabian von Schlabrendorff's book Offiziere gegen Hitler, he is mentioned only in the death-roll.

In his last letter, Hans-Jürgen wrote:

My Most Tender Love!

When these lines reach your good, lovely hands, I will no longer be in this world. I have been sentenced to death and am smoking a final cigarette. Shortly I will pass into eternity, where we will once again find each other and never again be separated. I take with me a deep gratitude for everything that you have been to me and given to me in these past years... Yesterday I dreamt that Papa was standing in the doorway with his coat and hat and he said, "Come, my boy, it is time!"

Give my love to the children. It is also a difficult fate for them and they will only begin to understand it much later.

In my thoughts I take you once more in my arms. Soon that undying part of me will be with you and the children, until you all enter into eternity and you are once again united with

Your sincerest loving

Peter

Why he signed himself Peter is a mystery. It was possibly an agreed sign to his wife that the letter was either genuine or not genuine. It was, however, one of his son's Christian names. The children he refers to in his letter are his son, Hubertus Peter, then three years old, and his stepdaughter.
