= Mommsen family =

German family of historians

The Mommsen family is a German family of influential historians.

- Jens Mommsen (1783–1851) ∞ Sophie Elisabeth Krumbhaar (1792–1855)
  - Theodor Mommsen (1817-1903), 1902 Nobel Laureate in Literature ∞ Marie Reimer (1832–1907)
    - Marie Mommsen (1855–1936) ∞ Ulrich von Wilamowitz-Moellendorff (1848–1931)
    - Karl Mommsen (1861–1922)
      - Wilhelm Mommsen (1892–1966)
        - Wolfgang Mommsen (1930–2004) ∞ Sabine von Schalburg, other
        - Hans Mommsen (1930-2015) ∞ Margaretha Reindl
    - Ernst Mommsen (1863–1930) ∞ Klara Weber (1875–1953)
      - Theodor Ernst Mommsen (1905–1958)
      - Ernst Wolf Mommsen (1910–1979)
    - Hans Georg Mommsen (1873–1941)
      - Wolfgang A. Mommsen (1907–1986) ∞ Ingeborg Mend (1921–1992)
  - Tycho Mommsen (1819–1900) ∞ Franziska de Boor (1824–1902)
  - August Mommsen (1821–1913)
