= Ernst Kantorowicz =

German-American historian (1895–1963)

Ernst Hartwig Kantorowicz
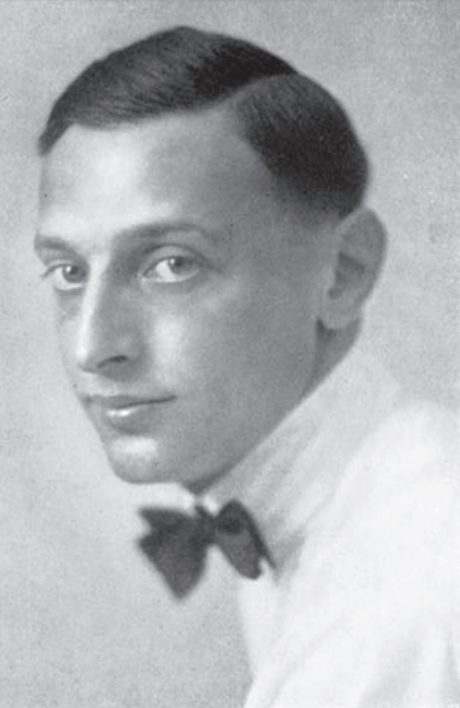
- Ernst Kantorowicz in 1921
- Born: May 3, 1895; Posen, German Empire
- Died: September 9, 1963 (aged 68); Princeton, New Jersey, U.S.
- Occupation: Historian
- Awards: Iron Cross II. Class (1915); Gallipoli Star (1917)

Academic background
- Education: Heidelberg University
- Doctoral advisor: Eberhard Gothein

Academic work
- School or tradition: George circle (before 1933)
- Institutions: University of Frankfurt am Main; University of California, Berkeley; Institute for Advanced Study
- Main interests: Medieval history Political theology
- Notable works: Frederick the Second; The King's Two Bodies
- Influenced: Agamben; Foucault; Neumann; Pound; Žižek; Rushdoony
- Military career
- Allegiance: German Empire
- Branch: Imperial German Army
- Service years: 1914-1918
- Rank: Vizewachtmeister
- Conflicts: Battle of Verdun; Ottoman front

Ernst Hartwig Kantorowicz (May 3, 1895 – September 9, 1963) was a German historian of medieval political and intellectual history and art, known for his 1927 book Kaiser Friedrich der Zweite on Holy Roman Emperor Frederick II, and The King's Two Bodies (1957) on medieval and early modern ideologies of monarchy and the state. He was an elected member of both the American Philosophical Society and the American Academy of Arts and Sciences.

== Life ==
=== Early life and education ===
Kantorowicz was born in Posen (then part of Prussia) to a wealthy, assimilated German-Jewish family, and as a young man was groomed to take over his family's prosperous liquor distillery business. He was also the cousin of author and Muslim homosexual activist Hugo Marcus.

Kantorowicz served as an officer in the German Army for four years in World War I. According to his biographer Robert E. Lerner, Kantorowicz served in a field artillery regiment and fought at Battle of Verdun, where he was wounded. He was awarded the Iron Cross, second class in 1915. He was later sent to the Ottoman front as a translator and liaison for Otto Liman von Sanders, commander of the Ottoman Fifth Army. In 1917, he was awarded the Iron Crescent, the "Ottoman counterpart of the Iron Cross." According to his friend Maurice Bowra and cousin-in-law Arthur Salz, Kantorowicz was later dismissed by von Sanders after having an affair with his mistress, and returned to Germany in May 1918.

After the war, he matriculated at the Friedrich Wilhelm University of Berlin to study economics, at one point also joining a right-wing militia that fought against Polish forces in the Greater Poland Uprising (1918–1919) and helped put down the Spartacist uprising in Berlin. The following year, he transferred briefly to the Ludwig-Maximilians-Universität München, where once again he was involved in armed clashes between leftists and pro-government militias, but soon thereafter settled on Heidelberg University where he continued to enroll in economics courses while developing a broader interest in Arabic, Islamic Studies, history, and geography.

While in Heidelberg, Kantorowicz became involved with the so-called George-Kreis or George circle, a group of artists and intellectuals devoted to the German symbolist poet and aesthete Stefan George, believing that George's poetry and philosophy would become the foundation of a great revival of the nationalist spirit in post-war Germany. In 1921, Kantorowicz was awarded a doctorate supervised by Eberhard Gothein based on a slim dissertation on "artisan associations" in the Muslim world.

=== Frankfurt ===
Despite the furor over the Frederick book, and not having written a formal Habilitationsschrift (second thesis to qualify for a professorial appointment), Kantorowicz received an (honorary) professorship at the University of Frankfurt am Main in 1930, though he remained at the Friedrich Wilhelm University of Berlin until 1931. By December 1933, however, Kantorowicz had to cease giving lectures due to increasing pressure on Jewish academics under the new Nazi regime, though he gave a subversive "reinaugural" lecture titled "The Secret Germany"—a motto of the George-Kreis—setting out his position in light of the new political situation on November 14 of that year. After taking several leaves of absence, he was finally granted an early retirement with a pension in 1935. He remained in Germany until departing for the United States in 1938, when after the Kristallnacht riots it became clear that the situation for even assimilated Jews such as himself was no longer tenable.

=== From Berkeley to Princeton ===
Kantorowicz accepted a lectureship at the University of California, Berkeley in 1939. After several years, Kantorowicz was finally able to secure a permanent professorship, but in 1950, he famously resigned in protest when the UC Regents demanded that all continuing faculty sign a loyalty oath disavowing affiliation with any politically subversive movements. Kantorowicz insisted he was no leftist and pointed to his role in an anti-communist militia as a young university student, but nonetheless objected on principle to an instrument which he viewed as a blatant infringement on academic freedom and freedom of conscience more generally.

During the controversy in Berkeley, two eminent German émigré medievalists working in Princeton, Theodore Mommsen (grandson of the great classical historian) and the art historian Erwin Panofsky, persuaded J. Robert Oppenheimer, director of the prestigious Institute for Advanced Study, to appoint Kantorowicz to the institute's faculty of Historical Studies. Kantorowicz accepted the offer in January 1951 and moved to Princeton, where he remained for the rest of his career.

== Works ==
=== Frederick the Second ===
Although his degree was in Islamic economic history, Kantorowicz's interests soon turned to the European Middle Ages and to ideas about kingship in particular. His association with the elitist and culturally conservative George-Kreis inspired Kantorowicz to undertake writing a sweeping and highly unorthodox biography of the great Holy Roman emperor Frederick II, published in German in 1927 and English in 1931. Instead of offering a more typical survey of laws, institutions, and important political and military achievements of Frederick's reign, the book struck a distinctly panegyrical tone, portraying Frederick as a tragic hero and an idealized "Roman German".

It included no footnotes and seemed to elide historical events with more fanciful legends and propagandistic literary depictions. The work elicited a combination of bewilderment and criticism from the mainstream historical academy. Reviewers complained that it was literary myth-making and not a work of serious historical scholarship. As a result, Kantorowicz published a hefty companion volume (Ergänzungsband) in 1931 which contained detailed historical documentation for the biography.

=== The King's Two Bodies ===
In 1957, Kantorowicz published his masterpiece, The King's Two Bodies, which explored, in the words of the volume's subtitle, "medieval political theology". The book traced the ways in which theologians, historians, and canon lawyers in the Middle Ages and early modern period understood "the king" as both a mortal individual and an institution which transcends time. Drawing on a diverse array of textual and visual sources, including Shakespeare and Dante, The King's Two Bodies made a major contribution to the way historians and political scientists came to understand the evolution of ideas about authority and charisma vested in a single individual versus transpersonal conceptions of the realm or the state in pre-modern Europe. The book remains a classic in the field.

Kantorowicz's account drew significantly on the French theologian Henri de Lubac, particular his study Corpus Mysticum. De Lubac's history of the Church as the mystical body of Christ helped Kantorowicz explain how theological concepts of corporate identity and continuity were transferred to secular political institutions.

==== Lineage in Kantorowicz's work ====
Scholars in recent years have traced the origins of the King's Two Bodies to Kantorowicz's specific time and place in 1920s and 1930s Germany, and driven in part by his wish to respond to contemporaneous theories about the theological origins of modern sovereignty.

Likely due to the polarizing reception of Kantorowicz's first book about the life of Frederick II (Kaiser Friedrich der Zweite) due to its lack of footnotes, Kantorowicz did rigorous research for The King's Two Bodies and cites heavily throughout the book. In Frederick II, the ruler was shown to be the founder of the secular state, at that point a new type of political entity that expressed the wishes of a lay culture that had been spreading for a century in Europe. Scholars draw a direct lineage of intellectual ambitions from the early to late Kantorowicz.

In Frederick II ideas about the relation between the monarch and the state are proposed but only fulfilled in the Tudor legal doctrine Kantorowicz elaborates and interprets in The King's Two Bodies: that "a successful secular state" finds its basis in "an all-encompassing body politic housed in the monarch’s body." Kantorowicz also believed that the doctrines advocated by these jurists-cum-theologians were ultimately fictitious yet emotionally satisfying. He believed that any political theory is based not on truth but non-rational psychological power.

William Shakespeare's play Richard II includes many themes relevant to the book including conceptions of the body politic.

Kantorowicz was concerned with the problem of ideas from the theological or religious world being transferred to the secular, a process that he believed characterized modernity. Thus, theological ideas are made juridical; liturgical political; and the notion of Christendom becomes a "humanistic community of mankind."

== Reception ==
=== Cantor controversy ===
Kantorowicz was the subject of a controversial biographical sketch in the book Inventing the Middle Ages (1991) by the medievalist Norman Cantor. Cantor suggested that, but for his Jewish heritage, the young Kantorowicz could be considered a Nazi in terms of his intellectual temperament and cultural values. Cantor compared Kantorowicz with another contemporary German medievalist, Percy Ernst Schramm, who worked on similar topics and later joined the Nazi Party and served as the staff diarist for the German High Command during the war. In addition to highlighting Kantorowicz's elitist nationalism in the Weimar period, Cantor claimed that Kantorowicz had been under the protection of the Nazi government.

Kantorowicz's defenders, including his student Robert L. Benson, responded that although as a younger man Kantorowicz embraced the Romantic ultranationalism of the George-Kreis, he had only contempt for Nazism and was a vocal critic of Hitler's regime, both before and after the war. Other historians who have criticized Kantorowicz in other respects have also since rejected Cantor's arguments, including David Abulafia and Robert E. Lerner. Conrad Leyser, summarizing the controversy in his 2016 introduction to The King's Two Bodies, describes Cantor's account as a "tissue of falsehoods and half-truths", but also a predictable reaction to Kantorowicz's own suppression of his German past. Michael Lipkin, also in 2016, concluded that Cantor was right to note the right-wing politics of Frederick the Second in particular, but he "cripples his argument by massaging his story".

== Bibliography ==
- Kaiser Friedrich der Zweite, Georg Bondi, 1927.
- Das Geheime Deutschland, Vorlesung, 1933.

=== Works in English ===
- Frederick II.: 1194–1250 (1931) (online at Archive.org)
- "A Norman Finale of the Exultet and the Rite of Sarum", The Harvard Theological Review, 34 (2), (1941). doi:10.1017/S0017816000031485. JSTOR 1508128. ISSN 0017-8160.
- "Plato in the Middle Ages", The Philosophical Review, 51 (3), (1942). doi:10.2307/2180909. JSTOR 2180909.
- Laudes Regiae: A Study in Liturgical Acclamations and Mediaeval Ruler Worship, University of California Press, (1946). doi:10.1086/ahr/51.4.702.
- "The Quinity of Winchester", Art Bulletin, Vol. XXIV, (1947). doi:10.2307/3047110. JSTOR 3047110.
- The Fundamental Issue: Documents and Marginal Notes on the University of California Loyalty Oath, Parker Print. Co., 1950. OCLC 1182841.
- "Dante's 'Two Suns'", in Semitic and Oriental Studies, 1951.
- "Pro Patria Mori in Medieval Political Thought", The American Historical Review, 56 (3), (1951). doi:10.2307/1848433. JSTOR 1848433.
- "Inalienability: A Note on Canonical Practice and the English Coronation Oath in the Thirteenth Century", Speculum, Vol. XXIX, 1954. JSTOR 2846791.
- "Mysteries of State: An Absolutist Concept and its Late Medieval Origins", Harvard Theological Review, Vol. XLVIII, 1955. doi:10.2307/2846791. JSTOR 1508452.
- The King's Two Bodies: A Study in Mediaeval Political Theology, Princeton University Press, (1957). doi:10.2307/j.ctvcszz1c. ISBN 0691017042. JSTOR j.ctvcszz1c.
- Frederick the Second, 1194–1250, Frederick Ungar Publishing Co., 1957. ISBN 1548217115.
- "The Prologue to Fleta and the School of Petrus de Vinea," Speculum, 32 (2), 1957. doi:10.2307/2849115. JSTOR 2849115.
- "On the Golden Marriage Belt and the Marriage Rings of the Dumbarton Oaks Collection", Dumbarton Oaks Papers, 14, 1960. doi:10.2307/1291142. JSTOR 1291142.
- "The Archer in the Ruthwell Cross", The Art Bulletin, 42 (1), 1960. doi:10.2307/3047875. JSTOR 3047875.
- "Gods in Uniform", Proceedings of the American Philosophical Society, Vol. CV, 1961. OCLC 84680316. JSTOR 985496.
- "Puer Exoriens: On the Hypapante in the Mosaics of S. Maria Maggiore," Perennitas, 1963.
- Selected Studies, J.J. Augustin, 1965. OCLC 1600443.
- Lerner, Robert E, ed. (2025). Radiances: Unpublished Essay on Gods, Kingship, and Images of the State. Ithaca: Cornell University. ISBN 9781501782527.

== See also ==
- Harold F. Cherniss, historian of ancient philosophy, friend and colleague of Kantorowicz, helped him secure a position at the Institute at Advanced Study after the 'loyalty oath' affair at Berkeley
- Kahler-Kreis
