= Friedrich Wolters =

German historian and writer

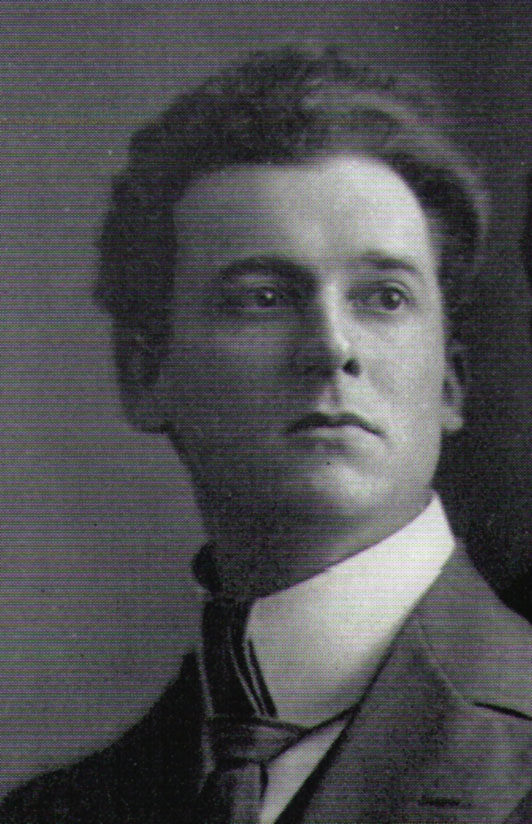
Friedrich Wolters; photograph by Jacob Hilsdorf (1910, detail)

Friedrich Wilhelm Wolters (2 September 1876 in Uerdingen – 14 April 1930 in Munich) was a German historian, poet and translator; one of the central figures in the George-Kreis.

== Life and work ==
He was the son of Friedrich Wolters, a businessman, and received his primary education in Rheydt and graduated from a gymnasium in Munich. In 1891, he began studying history, linguistics and philosophy at the University of Freiburg but, after one semester, returned to Munich. From 1899, he studied history and economics at Friedrich Wilhelm University in Berlin, with Kurt Breysig and Gustav von Schmoller. In 1900, he spent some time in Paris, attending lectures at the Sorbonne. He received his Doctorate in 1903. Two years later, he published an expanded version of his dissertation.

From 1907 to 1908, he served as one of the private instructors to Prince August Wilhelm of Prussia, who was struggling to complete his Doctorate. It is believed that Wolters wrote the Prince's dissertation himself. It was accepted "summa cum laude". Wolters received a few hundred Reichsmarks and was awarded the Order of the Crown, 4th class. After that, he earned his living as a teacher; primarily at girls' schools.

In 1909, after many years of trying to meet the poet Stefan George, whom he greatly admired, he finally attracted his attention with a pamphlet called Herrschaft und Dienst (Leadership and Service). Excerpts were published in George's magazine, Blätter für die Kunst. Wolters description of an ideal ruler and his society was specifically designed to flatter George. Shortly after, they spent a few weeks together in Berlin. The following year, he was accepted into George's inner circle, as someone who could broaden his image among German youth.

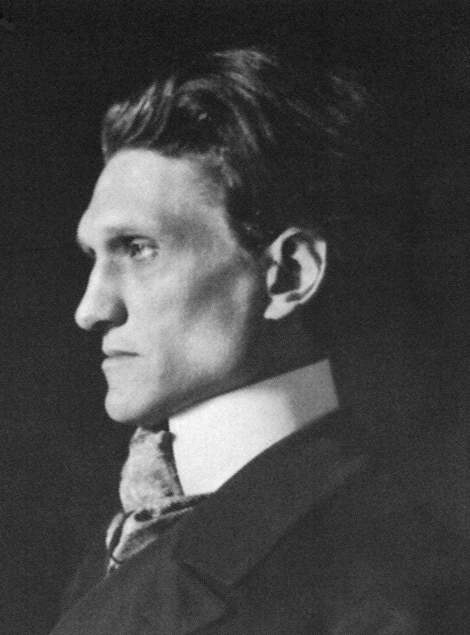
Stefan George in 1910

For this purpose, he published a new journal, the Jahrbuch für die geistige Bewegung (Yearbook for the Spiritual Movement), edited by Friedrich Gundolf. It included several major contributions by Wolters. For the first volume, he proposed dividing the human mind into "creative" and "ordering" forces, which are in opposition.0 In the next volume, he expanded on the concept of "gestalt" and its relationship to holism. In volume three, he extended his concepts to their external state, calling upon youth to take responsibility for the renewal of society. His proposals rejected the idea of equality, in favor of a natural hierarchy, under the benevolent control of a charismatic leader.

Wolters commitment to George was unconditional, and he would beg permission from "The Master" before undertaking any action, however simple. His reverence reached the point where other members of the Circle referred to him as "St. Paul", and friends from his earlier days were appalled by what they considered to be a "hideous transformation". Although George greatly appreciated Wolter's contributions to his movement, these strong feelings were not returned. In fact, many of George's followers were uncomfortable with this degree of adoration, so Wolters essentially ended by creating his own "Circle".

In 1914, after a year of studying, he passed the habilitation exam and became a private lecturer at the University. Shortly after, World War I broke out. He served as a driver and courier in several places, on both fronts, but never saw combat, although he did witness some events of the Serbian campaign. In his letters, he glorified the conflict and spoke of the spiritual feelings aroused by the war of attrition. In 1915, while on leave, he married Erika Schwartzkopff, who he had met at the home of his former instructor, Breysig; also a member of the Circle.

=== Professor of History ===
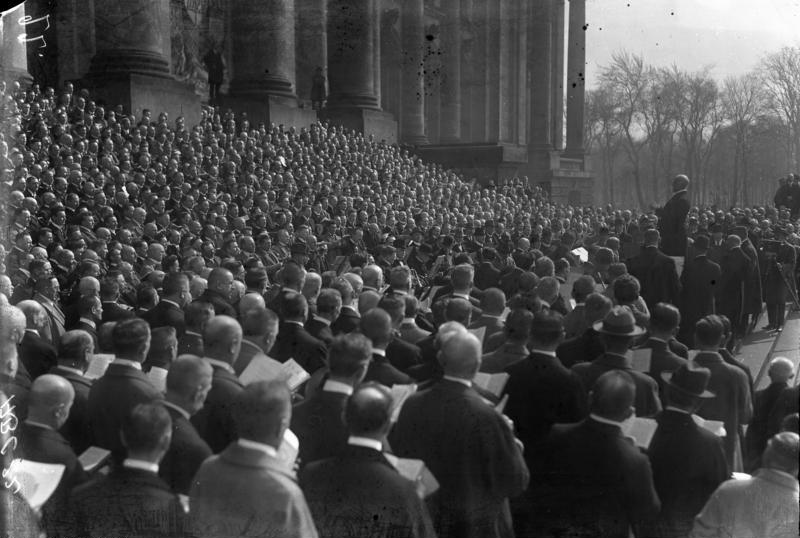
A rally against the French occupation of the Ruhr Valley ("The Black Disgrace")

In 1920, he was appointed professor of history at the University of Marburg, where he sought talented young men to join the Circle; making a significant impression on many. Some admired him, but rejected George. His students included Hans-Georg Gadamer, Herman Schmalenbach, Roland Hampe and Adolf Reichwein. George stayed with Wolters for several weeks every year. In 1924, he received another professorship, at the University of Kiel. He owed that appointment to Carl Heinrich Becker, State Secretary at the Ministry of Education, who used his influence to promote members of the Circle. Once again, George was a regular visitor.

His wife, Erika, died in 1925. By this time, he had virtually abandoned history for nationalist propaganda. He also became involved in issues of racial purity, and was a major contributor to encouraging belief in what was called "Die schwarze Schmach" (The Black Disgrace). His position was somewhere between the German National People's Party (DNVP) and the German People's Party (DVP). He once took part in a völkisch memorial service for the right-wing martyr, Albert Leo Schlageter. George, who disliked common politics, became increasingly skeptical of Wolters' ideas and motives.

In 1927 he remarried, to Gemma Thiersch (1907-1994), daughter of the architect Paul Thiersch. Two years later, he published what he considered to be his "magnum opus": Stefan George und die Blätter für die Kunst. Deutsche Geistesgeschichte seit 1890 (Stefan George and the Leaves of Art: German intellectual history since 1890). The critical reception was mixed. Even Friedrich Gundolf, one of George's early followers, thought it was a " hopelessly bad, thoroughly mendacious book". There were also anti-Semitic undertones that led Jewish members of the Circle, such as Karl Wolfskehl, to express their resentment.

He had suffered from heart problems since being hospitalized for severe rheumatism in 1917, during the war. While visiting Munich in 1930, he became ill and was diagnosed with an arterial thrombosis. After showing some improvement, he died suddenly, a month later, and was interred at the Waldfriedhof. His friends, Julius Landmann and Carl Petersen created the Friedrich Wolters Foundation; supported with funds from the University of Kiel. After Landmann's death, the Foundation became associated with the Nazis and his widow, Edith, called for its dissolution. It continued to operate until 1937, when its funding was withdrawn.
