= Karl F. Morrison =

American historian

Karl Frederick Morrison (born November 3, 1936) is an American historian of medieval intellectual history and religious culture and the Lessing Professor Emeritus of History and Poetics at Rutgers University.

He was born in Birmingham, Alabama and received a bachelor's degree in 1956 from the University of Mississippi. He earned his master's degree (1957) and Ph.D (1961) in medieval history from Cornell University, where he studied with Ted Mommsen and Brian Tierney. His dissertation, published in 1964 as The Two Kingdoms: Ecclesiology in Carolingian Political Thought, received the McKnight Foundation Award in the Humanities.

During his career, Morrison has taught at a number of institutions, including Harvard and the University of Chicago. Most recently, from 1988 until his retirement in 2011, he was the Lessing Distinguished Professor of History and Poetics in the History Department at Rutgers University in New Jersey.

Morrison has been the recipient of numerous scholarly awards and distinctions, including a Guggenheim fellowship. He has been a Carey Faculty Fellow in the Erasmus Institute at the University of Notre Dame, and was elected a Fellow of the Medieval Academy of America in 1986. He has several times been a member or visitor of the Institute for Advanced Study in Princeton.

Morrison's scholarship is wide-ranging and interdisciplinary, with a particular focus on the history of ideas and their influence over the longue durée of Western history. He has written on medieval historiography in the context of its hermeneutics, for instance in the works of the Cistercian historian Otto of Freising. In History as a Visual Art in the Twelfth-Century Renaissance (Princeton University Press, 1990), Morrison argued that twelfth-century historiographers approached their subject with a strong aesthetic sensibility that relied heavily on the visual imagination. His Understanding Conversion (University of Virginia Press, 1992), was awarded the Medieval Academy's Haskins Prize in 1994.

== Select Bibliography ==
The Two Kingdoms: Ecclesiology in Carolingian Political Thought (Princeton, 1964)

"Otto of Freising's Quest for the Hermeneutic Circle," Speculum 55 (1980), 207-236

History as a Visual Art in the Twelfth-century Renaissance (Princeton, 1990)

Understanding Conversion, The Page-Barbour Lectures at the University of Virginia, 1990 (Charlottesville, Va., 1992)

(As editor, with Rudolph Bell) Studies on Medieval Empathies (Turnhout, 2013)
