= The King's Two Bodies =

1957 book by Ernst Kantorowicz

- Author: Ernst Kantorowicz
- Publisher: Princeton University Press
- Media type: Print
- Pages: 616 pp.
- ISBN: 978-0691017044

The King's Two Bodies (subtitled, A Study in Mediaeval Political Theology) is a 1957 historical book by Ernst Kantorowicz. It concerns medieval political theology and the distinctions separating the "body natural" (a monarch's corporeal being) and the "body politic" (the state, or incoporeal political community, of which the monarch holds the office of sovereign).

The book has had significant influence on the field of medieval studies, even as its methods and style of argumentation are viewed with wariness by contemporary scholars. It is the recipient of the Haskins medal from the Medieval Academy of America.

Stephen Greenblatt has said that the book is a "remarkably vital, generous, and generative work," while the historian Morimichi Watanabe called it a "monumental classic." Others have called it "an unnoticed volume on the shelves" that remains important and influential in disciplines including art history. It is also said to have more admirers than readers. Horst Bredekamp, an art historian, has referred to the book as a "continuous success". It has been kept in print since 1957 by Princeton University Press and has been translated into Romanian, French, German, Italian, and Spanish.

Scholarly technique in the book includes use of art, philosophy, religion, law, numismatics, and archaeology.

== Background ==
The King's Two Bodies is described by historian Paul Monod as "boldly conceived, meticulously researched, and beautifully written." It attempts to show how a monarchical state developed out of Christian religious beliefs, specifically as articulated in mid-Tudor England. At that time, English legal doctrine saw the physical body of the ruler as joined to a "perfect, immutable and eternal body of the whole polity." Kantorowicz then argues that this is a culmination of Catholic teachings about the body of Christ.

== Structure ==
The book is structured around an exploration of the numerous devices and technologies medieval theologians and lawyers developed to "defeat death" and "extend bodily existence far beyond carnal boundaries".

Kantorowicz's magnum opus does not follow a linear or chronological structure. One scholar has said that it is "free-minded and unsystematic ... as though a happy society of fairies and spiders had come together to weave a learned web". It begins with an introduction to the theme of the King's "two bodies" as found in the reports of Edmund Plowden, an Elizabethan jurist. It then revisits the appearance of the same ideas as developed by William Shakespeare in Richard II. The problem and its horizon of enquiry is thus established for the reader: what makes the "juridical fiction" of the symbolic body of the king possible?

The author's excavation of these threads was not without controversy. Among Edmund Plowden's Reports, for instance, was a dispute over whether or not King Edward VI held the duchy of Lancaster as private property, or whether it belonged to the crown. The lawyers argued the latter:

the king has in him two Bodies, viz., a Body natural, and a Body politic. His Body natural (if it be considered in itself) is a Body mortal, subject to all Infirmities that come by Nature or Accident, to the Imbecility of Infancy or old Age … But his Body politic is a Body that cannot be seen or handled, consisting of Policy and Government, and constituted for the Direction of the People, and the management of the public weal, and this Body is utterly void of Infancy, and old Age, and other natural Defects and Imbecilities, which the Body natural is subject to, and for this Cause, what the King does in his Body politic, cannot be invalidated or frustrated by any Disability in his natural Body.

Whereas the medievalist F. W. Maitland saw "metaphysical nonsense" in remarks such as this, Kantorowicz perceived "a mystical fiction with theological roots, unconsciously transferred by Tudor jurists to the myth of the State".

The remainder of the text — the argument proper — then turns to "Christ-centered Kingship", "Law-centered Kingship" and "Polity-centered Kingship". These are a rough taxonomy of the multiple manifestations of mystical and corporeal kingship, which Kantorowicz tracks throughout history in a variety of cultures. The final three sections address respectively continuity and corporations (drawing on F. W. Maitland's analysis of "The Crown as Corporation"), the immortality of the king (as transcendental, not physical, body) and "Man-centered kingship", which contains a close discussion of the work of Dante Alighieri.

== Reception and influence ==
A primary reason for a revival of interest in Kantorowicz's work in the post-WWII era was the use of the work by Michel Foucault in his classic Discipline and Punish, where he drew a parallel between the duality of the king and the body of a man condemned. Reworkings of (and homages to) Kantorowicz's title have included The Queen's Two Bodies, The Pope's Body, The King's Two Maps, the People's Two Bodies, the King's Other Body, and more.

One of the more notable controversies involving Kantorowicz's legacy was Norman Cantor's claim that Kantorowicz was one of two "Nazi twins" (the other being Percy Ernst Schramm) due to the popular reception of his book on Frederick II among members of the Nazi party. Cantor's arguments, however, were later regarded as a twisting of facts and a "massive libel."
