= Theodor Ernst Mommsen =

German medieval historian

Theodor Ernst "Ted" Mommsen (/ˈmɒmzən/; July 11, 1905, Berlin – July 18, 1958, Ithaca, New York) was a German historian of medieval cultural and intellectual history with wide-ranging scholarly interests, from the Church Father Augustine of Hippo to the early Renaissance poet Petrarch. He was the grandson, and namesake, of the renowned historian of ancient Rome Theodor Mommsen. Mommsen began his academic career in Germany but emigrated to the United States in 1936 to escape Nazism.

== Early life and education ==
Theodor Ernst was born in Berlin in 1905. His father, Ernst (1863-1930) was an eminent physician and the second son of historian and Nobel literature laureate Theodor Mommsen (1807-1903), widely considered one of the greatest European scholars of the 19th century. His mother, Klara (1875-1953), was the sister of the sociologist and political economist Max Weber. Another uncle by marriage was the classical scholar Ulrich von Wilamowitz-Moellendorff. He had three older siblings, Konrad (b. 1896), Helene (b. 1893), and Clara (called Clärchen) (b. 1901). A younger brother, Ernst Wolf (b. 1910), became a prominent businessman and industrialist in West Germany after the war. Theodor Ernst was educated at the universities of Heidelberg and Vienna, and received his PhD from the University of Berlin in medieval history in 1929. He then became a research fellow ("wissenschaftlicher Mitarbeiter") at the Monumenta Germaniae Historica (MGH) under the supervision of its demanding director, Paul Fridolin Kehr. One of his main assignments was to assemble material for the Monumenta's edition of the diplomas and legislation of the Holy Roman emperors Louis the Bavarian (1328-47) and Charles IV (1355-78), a task which took him on frequent study trips to archives in Germany, France, and Italy.

== Career in the United States ==
Though not Jewish, Mommsen was deeply distressed by the rise of Nazism in the 1930s and so moved to the United States in 1936, initially with a fellowship to teach for one year at Johns Hopkins University. He then accepted an appointment as an instructor at Yale, where he remained until 1942. When war broke out between the United States and Germany, however, the Yale administration was hesitant to keep a citizen of a hostile power on the faculty, and also facing a large drop in enrollments due to the draft, did not renew his contract. Thus from 1942 to 1946, he taught Latin and history at the Groton School, an elite preparatory academy in Massachusetts. While at Groton, he also lectured to American soldiers preparing for deployment, and even German POWs, on European history. In 1946, he was hired as an assistant professor at Princeton University, becoming the junior colleague of Joseph Reese Strayer in the medieval history field there. Mommsen was tenured and promoted to associate professor in 1948-49, the same year he was awarded a prestigious Guggenheim Fellowship that allowed him to return to Germany for the first time in over a decade. He was able to reestablish many of the familial and scholarly relationships that had been severed by the war. Still, a few years later, in 1954, he left for Cornell University in upstate New York, where he was offered a full professorial chair in medieval history.

Mommsen taught and mentored a number of students, particularly at Princeton, who went on to become notable scholars in medieval and Renaissance history in the United States in the second half of the twentieth century, including Gene Brucker, William Bowsky, Norman F. Cantor, and Robert L. Benson. Karl F. Morrison studied under Mommsen at Cornell and co-edited the (posthumously published) translated source collection with him, Imperial Lives and Letters of the Eleventh Century.

== Personal life and death ==
Throughout his life, Mommsen struggled both personally and professionally to escape the shadow of his famous grandfather. During his time at the MGH, he once stepped off a train in an Italian city where he planned to work in the archives, only to be greeted by a brass band, the mayor, and other local dignitaries, who mistakenly believed he was the elder Mommsen, who had been dead for several decades but was still renowned throughout Italy. At the University of Vienna, he even studied Chinese, instead of European, history for a time, hoping to create an academic path for himself where he would not be continually compared to his grandfather.

Mommsen never married, but maintained close ties and friendships with many fellow German refugee scholars in the United States, including Felix Gilbert, Paul Oskar Kristeller, and Ernst Kantorowicz, all with whom he shared an abiding interest in medieval and Renaissance literary and political culture and memories of life in pre-war Germany. He was one of several Princeton academics who lobbied J. Robert Oppenheimer to bring Kantorowicz to the Institute for Advanced Study following his resignation from UC Berkeley in 1950 in protest over the loyalty oaths being required of UC faculty at the time. American friends and colleagues, dispensing with German formalities, always referred to him as "Ted."

According to his close friend Felix Gilbert, Mommsen suffered bouts of depression throughout his adult life, but seemed to be happy in Cornell and was looking forward to an upcoming leave that he would spend back in Germany reunited with family and friends. On the morning of July 18, 1958, however, he was found unresponsive in his bed by a housekeeper. He died at an Ithaca hospital a short time later. The death was ruled a suicide from an overdose of barbiturates. Although it was reported that a suicide note was found among his effects, its contents were never disclosed and the exact reasons Mommsen chose to end his life when he did remain unknown.

== Works ==
Mommsen never published a major scholarly monograph. He did, however, produce a number of meticulously crafted essays and article-length studies that are still considered important contributions in the fields of patristics, and later medieval and Renaissance cultural history. His seminal studies of late medieval imperial political and archival history, based mostly on research he did for the MGH in the early 1930's, are collected in the volume Italienische Analekten zur Reichsgeschichte des 14. Jahrhunderts (1310-1378), ed. Wolfgang Hagemann, Schriften der MGH 11 (Stuttgart, 1952). Other essays, particularly those on Petrarch, are found in the anthology Medieval and Renaissance Studies, ed. Eugene F. Rice (Ithaca, 1959). A full bibliography of Professor Mommsen's published scholarship can be found at the RI-OPAC here.
