= Robert E. Lerner =

American medieval historian

Robert E. Lerner (born 1940, New York City) is an American medieval historian and professor of history emeritus at Northwestern University.

Lerner gained his B.A. at the University of Chicago and his Ph.D. at Princeton in 1964, where he studied with Joseph R. Strayer. He specialised in medieval heresy and millennial eschatology, as well as writing on a variety of topics in medieval religious and intellectual history. His major monographs are The Heresy of the Free Spirit in the Later Middle Ages (1972), The Powers of Prophecy (1983), and The Feast of Saint Abraham (2001). Prominent among his articles are the widely cited “Refreshment of the Saints” (1976) and “Ecstatic Dissent” (1992).

Lerner is a fellow of the Medieval Academy of America and the American Academy in Rome. In the course of his career he has received honours and awards from the John Simon Guggenheim Memorial Foundation, the Institute for Advanced Study in Princeton, the Historisches Kolleg in Munich, the Woodrow Wilson International Center for Scholars in Washington, D.C., and the Max-Planck Gesellschaft of the Federal Republic of Germany.

He has been guest lecturer at many American colleges and universities, the École des hautes études en sciences sociales in Paris, and such European universities as Berlin, Oxford, Heidelberg, and Florence. He is an active member on the editorial boards of a variety of historical journals.

Lerner recently published a biography of the medieval historian Ernst Kantorowicz and is currently preparing an edition of a treatise written during the Great Schism of the West.

== Personal life ==
He lives in Evanston, Illinois, and is married with two daughters.

== Major works ==
- The Heresy of the Free Spirit in the Later Middle Ages. Berkeley: University of California Press, 1972. Revised edition: Notre Dame, Ind.: University of Notre Dame Press, 1991.
- Co-author Western Civilizations: Their History and Their Culture. New York, N.Y.: W.W. Norton & Company, 1980, 1984, 1988, 1993, 1998.
- The Powers of Prophecy: The Cedar of Lebanon Vision from the Mongol Onslaught to the Dawn of the Enlightenment. Berkeley: University of California Press, 1983. Reprint: Ithaca, N.Y.: Cornell University Press, 2009.
- Weissagungen über die Päpste, with Robert Moynihan. Stuttgart: Belser Verlag, 1985.
- Johannes de Rupescissa, Liber secretorum eventuum: Edition critique, traduction et introduction historique, with C. Morerod-Fattebert. Fribourg, Switzerland: Editions Universitaires, 1994.
- Refrigerio dei santi. Rome: Viella, 1995.
- ed., Neue Richtungen in der hoch- und spätmittelalterlichen Bibelexegese. Munich: Oldenbourg Verlag, 1996.
- The Feast of Saint Abraham: The Joachite Millennium and the Jews. Philadelphia: University of Pennsylvania Press, 2001). Italian translation: La festa di sant’Abramo (Rome: Viella, 2002).
- Scrutare il futuro: L’eredità di Gioacchino da Fiore alla fine del Medioevo. Rome: Viella, 2008.
- Ernst Kantorowicz. A Life. Princeton: Princeton University Press, 2017.
