= Ernst Morwitz =

German-American poet, literary historian, and judge

Ernst Morwitz (September 13, 1887 – September 20, 1971) was a German-American poet, literary scholar, and judge.

== Biography ==
Born in Danzig in 1887, after studying law at Freiburg, Heidelberg, and Berlin, Morwitz served as a judge in Fürstenwalde from 1910 to 1930, then in Berlin from 1930 until his compulsory retirement due to his Jewish ancestry under the Nazi regime in 1935. He emigrated to the United States in 1938, where he served as a German teacher for the U.S. Army and, after the end of the war, lecturer in German literature at the University of North Carolina, Chapel Hill. He was naturalized as an American citizen in 1948. In 1952 West Germany restored Morwitz to an honorary judicial position, but he decided against returning there. He died in Muralto, Switzerland, in 1971.

Besides his judicial career, from 1905 Morwitz was a friend of the poet Stefan George and member of his circle, publishing poetry in George's journal, the Blätter für die Kunst. Following George's death in 1933 and his own subsequent emigration to the United States, he played an important role in promoting George's work in the Anglosphere through translations of his poems.

Morwitz died in Muralto. A posthumous collection of Morwitz's own poems was published in 1974.
