= Albrecht von Blumenthal =

German classical philologist

Albrecht von Blumenthal (10 August 1889 – 28 March 1945) was a Classicist professor and soldier.

== Early life ==
Albrecht von Blumenthal was born in Staffelde in Vorpommern, the son of Rittmeister Vally von Blumenthal and Cornelia Kayser. His father was a Prussian nobleman, his mother a descendant of the painters Lucas Cranach the elder and younger. He was educated by a private tutor PWG Gutzke, the Wilhelmsgymnasium at Eberswalde and then nominated by the Kaiser Wilhelm I as a Rhodes Scholar reading Philosophy at Lincoln College (Oxford University) from 1907 to 1909. He returned to Berlin University to switch to Classics and complete his degree in 1911. In 1913 his dissertation Hellanicea: De Atlantiade was approved by Carl Robert at the University of Halle.

== World War I ==
He volunteered as a trooper in the Second Heavy Cavalry at the outbreak of the First World War and was commissioned in the field after a few months. In the Second Battle of Champagne he was captured by the French and imprisoned in Corté, Corsica. After a failed escape attempt he was punished with solitary confinement in conditions where he contracted tuberculosis. After a spell on a hospital ship, which gave him his first and only glimpse of the Aegean, he was invalided home via Davos in an exchange of prisoners in 1917. Here he was reunited with his English wife Wilhelmine and briefly made the acquaintance of Lenin.

== Career ==
After the war he taught at Jena University from 1922. He produced research on Aeschylus, Archilochus and Hellanicus of Lesbos. From 1927 he contributed articles to the Realencyclopädie der classischen Altertumswissenschaft. In 1928 he was nominated as an auxiliary professor at Jena. In 1938 he was appointed full professor at Giessen University in the chair of Rudolf Herzog. The same year, he and his brother Robert allowed Dietrich Bonhoeffer to use their estate at Schlönwitz to run an illegal Lutheran seminary. On 10 April 1940 he applied to join the NSDAP and was admitted on 1 July (No. 8142228), very late indeed. His personal file indicates that his party membership was connected with his promotion from Ausserordentlicher to Ordentlicher Professor, which followed that year when he was appointed to a residential teaching professorship. However, he took little part in its activities and never rose to any significant rank in the party. His publications throughout the period of National Socialism were strictly apolitical and free from any kind of Führer-adulation.

== Social Academia ==
Blumenthal belonged to the Stefan George Set, to which he introduced Alexander Schenk Graf von Stauffenberg and his brothers Claus Schenk Graf von Stauffenberg and Berthold Schenk Graf von Stauffenberg, to whom he was close and to whom he dedicated one of his works.

== Family ==
Blumenthal's first wife was Wilhelmine Hainsworth, daughter of the Yorkshire industrialist A.W. Hainsworth. They had two sons who accompanied their mother back to England following the divorce. One was the historian Charles Arnold-Baker, who joined the British Army when WWII broke out, both later serving in MI6. After divorcing on grounds of his adultery, Albrecht remarried and had a further four children, Albrecht, Viktor, Karolina and Erika. Albrecht is a Lutheran Pastor, and Viktor currently teaches at Marburg University in the footsteps of his father.

Albrecht's cousin Hans-Jürgen, whom Albrecht introduced to Claus von Stauffenberg, was hanged for his part in the July Plot.

== Suicide ==
A conservative and patriotic German, he found it impossible to imagine life in an occupied Germany. In February 1945 Blumenthal fled with his second wife from the advancing American Army to Marburg and there, under a suicide pact, took the life of his wife and himself with his service pistol, on an upturned cart outside No. 12 Moltkestrasse on 28 March.
