= Maximilian Kronberger =

German poet

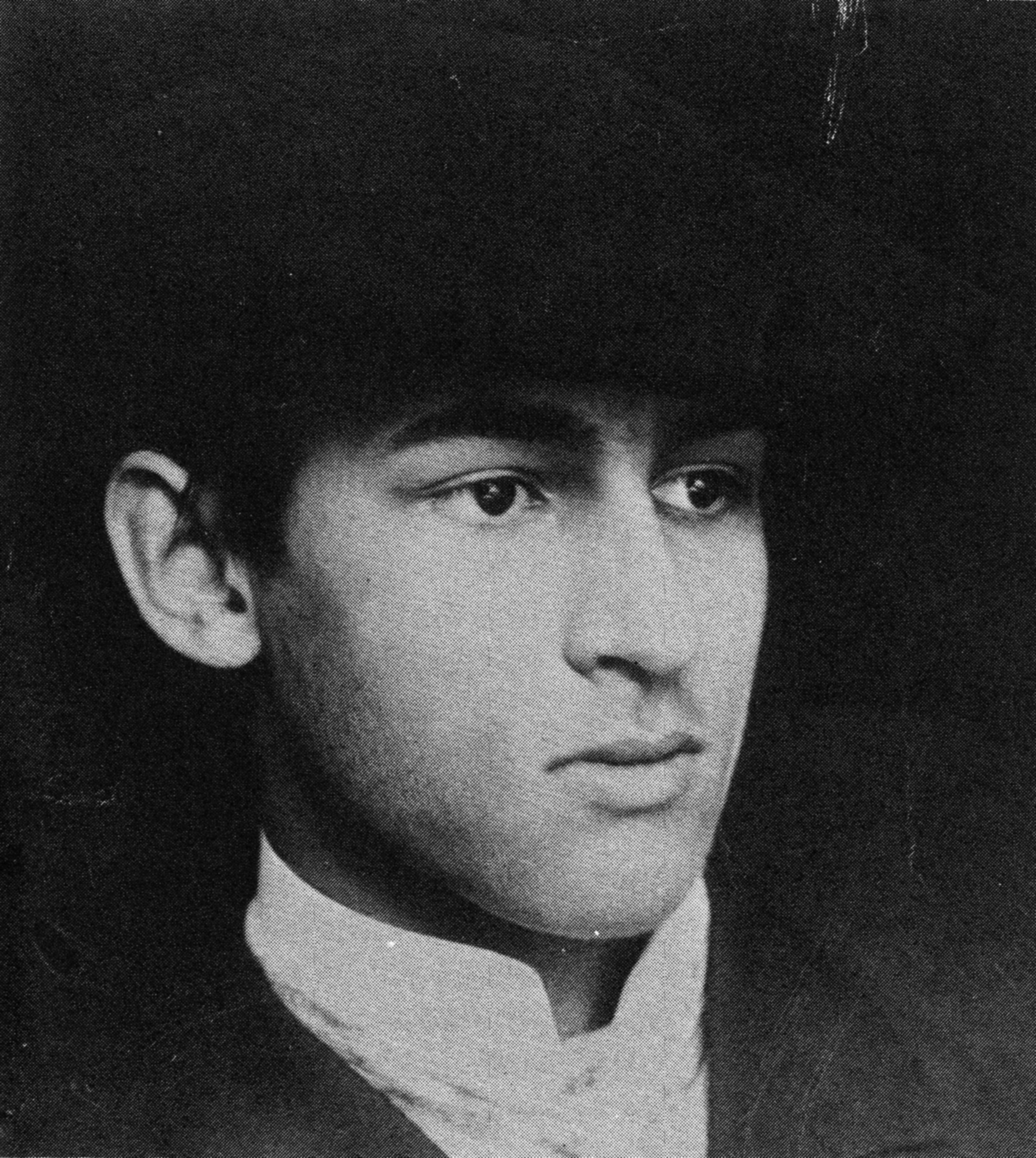
Maximilian Kronberger

Maximilian Kronberger, known familiarly as Maximin (April 15, 1888 – April 16, 1904), was a German poet and a significant figure in the literary circle of Stefan George (the so‑called George‑Kreis).

Maximin came to the attention of Stefan George in Munich in 1903 (according to some sources, in March 1902; others cite 1901 as the date of their original meeting); he died unexpectedly of meningitis the following year, on the day after his 16th birthday. He was "idealized [by George] to the point of proclaiming him a god, following his death... the cult of 'Maximin' became an integral part of the George circle's practice..." The Maximin-Erlebnis certainly provided George with inspiration for his work in subsequent years.

Thirty-three of Kronberger's poems are included in the posthumously published collective volume, Maximin: Ein Gedenkbuch (now a rare book).

== Primary references ==
- Maximilian Kronberger, Gedichte, Tagebücher, Briefe, ed. Georg Peter Landmann, Stefan-George-Stiftung (Stuttgart, Klett‑Cotta, 1987).
- Maximilian Kronberger, Maximilian Kronberger: Nachlass (Zurich, Bürdeke, 1937).

=== Subsidiary references ===
- Claus-Artur Scheier, 'Maximins Lichtung: Philosophische Bemerkungen zu Georges Gott', George‑Jahrbuch (Tübingen), No. 1 (1996/1997), pp. 80–106.
- Andreas Martin Mauz, 'Gedicht und Gebet: Aspekte einer Familienähnlichkeit', unpublished M.A. dissertation, University of Basle, 2001.
- Robert E. Norton, Secret Germany: Stefan George and his Circle (Ithaca, New York, Cornell University Press, 2002).

== See also ==
- Stefan George
- Erich Heller
- Petra Kronberger
