= Norman Cantor =

Canadian-American historian (1929–2004)

Norman F. Cantor
- Born: November 19, 1929; Winnipeg, Manitoba, Canada
- Died: 18 September 2004 (aged 74); Miami, Florida, U.S.
- Education: University of Manitoba (BA); Oriel College, Oxford; Princeton University (MA, PhD)
- Occupations: Historian; essayist; teacher
- Spouse: Mindy Mozart (m. 1957)
- Children: Howard Cantor, Judy Cantor

Norman Frank Cantor (November 19, 1929 – September 18, 2004) was a Canadian-American medievalist. Known for his accessible writing and engaging narrative style, Cantor's books were among the most widely read treatments of medieval history in English. He estimated that his textbook The Civilization of the Middle Ages, first published in 1963, had a million copies in circulation.

== Life and scholarship ==
Born in Winnipeg, Manitoba, Canada to a Jewish family, Cantor received a Bachelor of Arts degree at the University of Manitoba in 1951. He moved to the United States to obtain an M.A. degree (1953) from Princeton University, then spent a year as a Rhodes Scholar at Oriel College, Oxford. He returned to Princeton and received his Ph.D. in 1957 under the direction of eminent medievalist Joseph R. Strayer. He also began his teaching career at Princeton. His personal acquaintance and collaboration with many of the major medievalists of the twentieth century gave him a privileged view of the field, and allowed him to distinguish himself as a synthesizer and popularizer of the field. His magnum opus within the subject domain became the basic textbook and popular historical standard on the period for many years, and in a later work he defined the canon of major medievalists.

After teaching at Princeton, Cantor became a professor at Columbia University from 1960 to 1966. He was a Leff professor at Brandeis University until 1970 and then was at Binghamton University until 1976, when he took a position at University of Illinois at Chicago for two years. He then went on to New York University (NYU), where he served as Dean of NYU's College of Arts & Sciences, as well as a professor of history, sociology and comparative literature. After a brief stint as Fulbright Professor at the Tel Aviv University History Department (1987–1988), he returned to NYU where he taught as a professor emeritus until his retirement in 1999, at which time he devoted himself to working as a full-time writer.

Although his early work focused on English religious and intellectual history, Cantor's later scholarly interests were diverse, and he found more success writing for a popular audience than he did engaging in more narrowly focused original research. He did publish one monograph study, based on his graduate thesis, Church, kingship, and lay investiture in England, 1089-1135, which appeared in 1958 and remains an important contribution to the topic of church-state relations in medieval England. Throughout his career, however, Cantor preferred to write on the broad contours of Western history, and on the history of academic medieval studies in Europe and North America, in particular the lives and careers of eminent medievalists. His work sometimes received mixed reviews in academic circles, but these scholarly reactions to his work tend to reveal its contemporary pre-eminence as a reigning orthodoxy within the discipline whose perimeter less-famous (or more methodologically radical/postmodern) academics sought to critique. His books were often popular bestsellers, buoyed by Cantor's fluid, often colloquial, writing style and his lively critiques of persons and ideas both past and present.

Several books written outside Cantor's standard period and wheelhouse in the Middle Ages include his monograph Antiquity, his short biography of Alexander the Great, The Sacred Chain (a meditation on Jewish history), and his brief study on a pair of Renaissance thinkers: Dante & Machiavelli.

Cantor was intellectually conservative and expressed deep skepticism about what he saw as methodological fads, particularly Marxism and postmodernism, but he also argued for greater inclusion of women and minorities in traditional historical narratives. In his books Inventing the Middle Ages (1991) and Inventing Norman Cantor (2002), he reflected on his strained relationship over the years with other historians and with academia in general.

Upon retirement in 1999, Cantor moved to Miami, Florida, where he continued to work on several books up to the time of his death, including the New York Times bestseller In the Wake of the Plague (2001). He was also editor of Encyclopedia of the Middle Ages (1999).

He died of a heart failure in Miami at the age of 74.

== Cantor's canon of 'major medievalists' (of the 20th century) ==
Cantor's book, Inventing the Middle Ages, presents itself (more or less explicitly) as a canon of the most important contributions to Western European medieval scholarship during the twentieth century. He predicts at the end of the book that the problems remaining to be solved in the period wait upon a synthesis of the well-developed scholarship of Western European history with the as-yet-to-be successfully accomplished composition (and/or dissemination) of great masterworks of equal stature covering the Eastern, Byzantine, Jewish, and Islamic histories of the period.

Scholars who receive their own chapter length treatments in Cantor's canon of major western medievalists include:

- Frederick William Maitland ('Law & Society')
- Ernst Kantorowicz & Percy Ernst Schramm ('The Nazi Twins')
- Marc Bloch & Louis Halpern ('The French Jews')
- C.S. Lewis, J.R.R. Tolkien & Frederic Maurice Powycke ('The Oxford Fantasists')
- Charles Homer Haskins & Joseph Strayer ('American Pie')
- David Knowles & Étienne Gilson ('After the Fall')
- R.W. Southern ('The Once and Future King')

Outriders [re: Medievalists also receiving mention for their indelible contributions in the final chapter] or in small sections or shorter discussions throughout the book:

Eileen Power, Johan Huizinga, Gershom Scholem, Henri Pirenne, George Duby, Erwin Panofsky, M.M. Postan, Carl Erdmann, Theodor Ernst Mommsen, Emanuelle le Roy Ladurie, Carlo Ginzburg, Aby Warburg, Frances Yates, and Fritz Saxl.
