= Berthold Litzmann =

German literary historian (1857–1926)

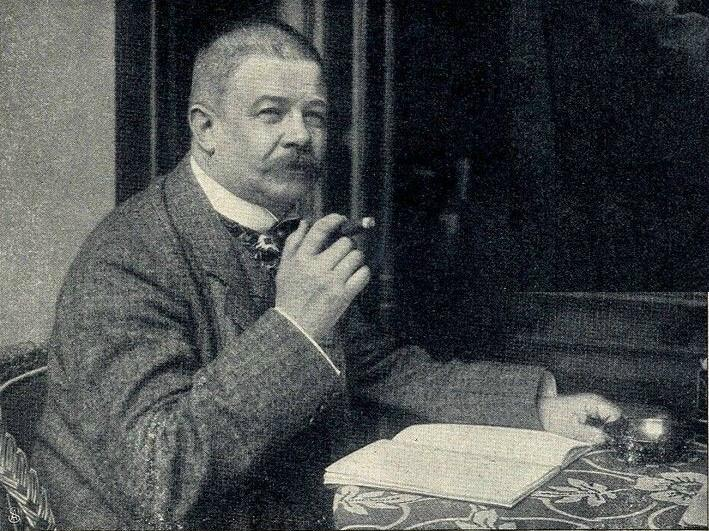
Berthold Litzmann

Berthold Litzmann (18 April 1857 – 14 October 1926) was a professor of German studies and a literature historian. He was a professor at the University of Bonn and the founder of the Society for Literature History, which also included Thomas Mann.

He is known as the author of a three part biography of Clara Schumann.

Litzmann was born in Kiel, the son of Carl Conrad Theodor Litzmann. He died in Munich.

== Works ==
- Clara Schumann. Ein Künstlerleben. Nach Tagebüchern und Briefen. 3 Volumes. Breitkopf & Härtel, Leipzig 1920.
- Ludwig Schröder. Ein Beitrag zur deutschen Litteratur- und Theatergeschichte. 2 Parts. Voß, Hamburg/Leipzig 1890–1894.
- Goethes Faust. Eine Einführung. Fleischel, Berlin 1904.
- Das Tragische in Gerhart Hauptmanns Dramen (= Mitteilungen der Literarhistorischen Gesellschaft Bonn. Jg. 3 Nr. 6, 1908). Ruhfus, Dortmund 1908.
