= Waclaw Rolicz-Lieder =

Polish poet

Wacław Rolicz-Lieder
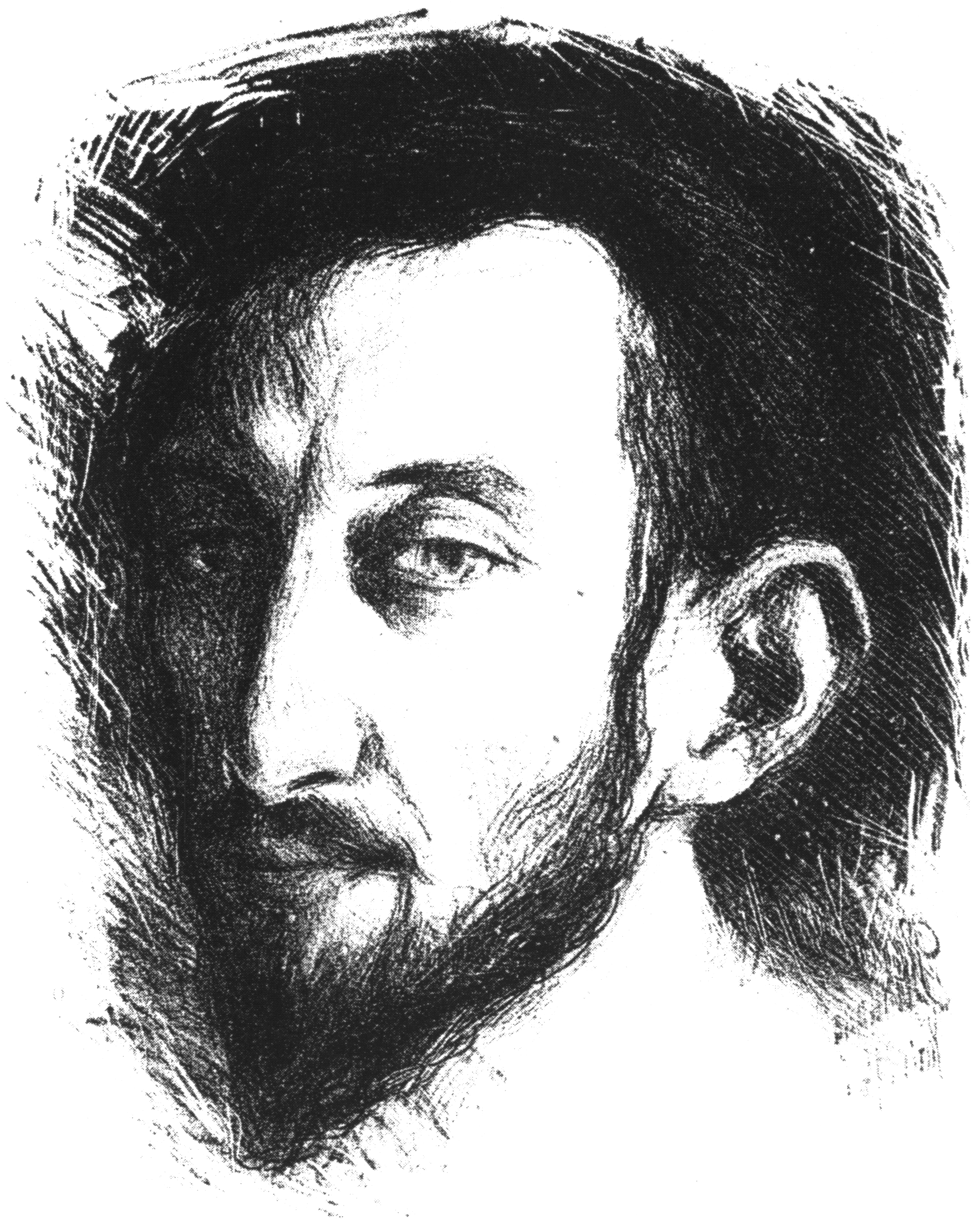
- Wacław Rolicz-Lieder
- Born: September 27, 1866 Warsaw, Poland
- Died: April 25, 1912 (aged 45) Warsaw, Poland
- Occupation: Poet, translator
- Language: Polish, German
- Literary movement: Symbolism
- Parents: German father (bank clerk), Polish mother

Wacław Rolicz-Lieder (* September 27, 1866 in Warsaw, Poland, † April 25, 1912), was a Polish Symbolist poet and translator of German poetry.

He was the son of a German immigrant bank clerk, and a Polish mother.

== Works ==
- Poezje I, Krakau 1889;
- Poezje II, Krakau 1891 (only 60 copies printed);
- Elementarz języka arabskiego (elementary book of the Arab one), Kirchhain 1893;
- Wiersze III, Krakau 1895 (only 50 copies);
- Abu Sajid Fadlullah Ben Abulhair i tegoż czterowiersze (translation from the Persian one), Krakau 1895;
- Moja Muza, Krakau 1896 (only 30 copies);
- Wiersze V, Krakau 1898 (only 20 copies);
- Nowe Wiersze, Krakau 1903 (collected poems, 100 copies);
- Wybór Poezji, Krakau 1962, (500 copies);
- Poezje wybrane, Warsaw 1962, (1000 copies).
