= Robert Boehringer =

German industrialist and poet

Robert Boehringer (30 July 1884 – 9 August 1974) was a German industrialist and poet.

Boehringer was the son of a factory owner. He spent his childhood, youth, and student years in Basel, where he earned his Ph.D. at the local university. Until 1920 he was the head of the family firm C.H. Boehringer in Ingelheim. From 1931, he was involved in the establishment of Hoffmann-La Roche in Basel and was a close friend of 1930s Roche leader Emil Barell. While he belonged to the ultra-pietist Boehringer family originally from Stuttgart, his esoteric views often conflicted with the Roche company culture cultivated by Barrell, leading to a falling out that was only reconciled shortly before Barrell's death.

In 1930 he settled in Geneva. After the outbreak of World War II Boehringer gave up his German citizenship and became a Swiss national. He founded the Commission mixte de Secours de la Croix Rouge Internationale and after the war he worked for J. R. Geigy AG.

From about 1905, Boehringer became a member of the circle of Stefan George and one of his most trusted friends. After George's death, Boehringer inherited and administered George's estate. In 1959 he established the Stefan George Foundation and the Stefan George Archive.

Works by Boehringer: „Über das Leben von Gedichten“, „Bildnisse und Nachweise“ and „Das Antlitz des Genius“.

Boehringers papers are held by the German Federal Archives.

== Literature ==
- Boehringer, Robert: Gedenken an Robert Boehringer, Stefan-George-Stiftung, Stuttgart 1994. Ed. Michael Stettler.
