= Stefan George =

German symbolist poet and translator

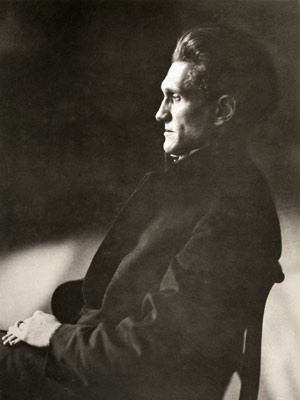
- 1910 photograph
- Born: Stefan Anton George; 12 July 1868; Büdesheim, Grand Duchy of Hesse, German Empire
- Died: 4 December 1933 (aged 65); Minusio, Ticino, Switzerland
- Occupation: Poet
- Writing career
- Language: German
- Notable awards: Goethe Prize (1927)

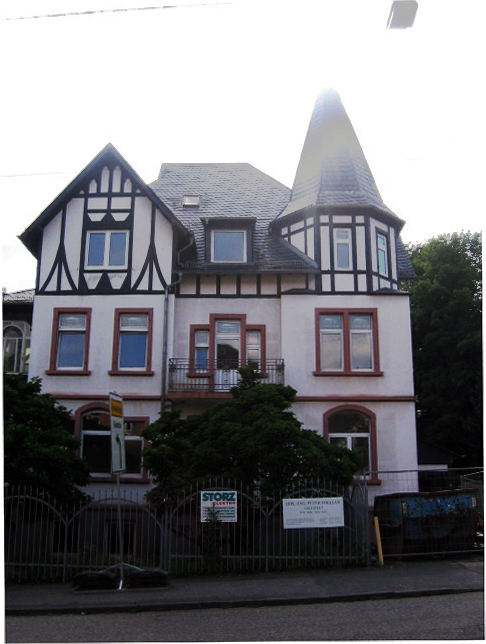
From 1921 George spent his summers in the hills on the south-western edge of Frankfurt at this house in Königstein, where he was attended by his sister, Anna.

Stefan Anton George (German: [ˈʃtɛfan ˈʔantoːn ɡeˈ(ʔ)ɔʁɡə]; 12 July 1868 – 4 December 1933) was a German symbolist poet and a translator of Dante Alighieri, William Shakespeare, Hesiod, and Charles Baudelaire. He is also known for his role as leader of the highly influential literary circle called the George-Kreis and for founding the literary magazine Blätter für die Kunst ("Journal for the Arts").

== Life and career ==
=== Early life ===
George was born in 1868 in Büdesheim in Bingen (now part of Bingen) in the Grand Duchy of Hesse. His father, also named Stefan George, was an innkeeper and wine merchant, and his mother Eva (née Schmitt) was a homemaker. When Stefan was five years old, the family moved to Bingen am Rhein.

According to Erika and Michael Metzger, both sides of the George family had lived in the area for generations and had risen from peasants, to millers, and finally to merchants.

At the time, the Roman Catholic Church was very important to the daily life of Bingen am Rhein and to the George family. Life revolved around the feast days of the Liturgical Calendar. Furthermore, when Stefan's mother died, the oleander trees she had planted when she had married her husband were donated to the nuns of the nearby Rochusberg, which symbolized a returning of God's gifts back to Him.

After attending primary school in Bingen, Stefan was sent, at the age of thirteen, to one of the best secondary schools in the Grand Duchy of Hesse, the Ludwig-Georgs-Gymnasium in the Grand-Duke Louis IV's capital city of Darmstadt. There, from 1882 to 1888, Stefan, "received a vigorous humanistic education in which Greek, Latin, and French were stressed."

Stefan "excelled in French" and gained "a thorough knowledge of modern European literature, as well as of the Greek and Roman authors."

Although later described as a loner, Stefan assembled his first circle of friends in Darmstadt, where he had access to libraries and to the theater, which fascinated him. He also taught himself to read Norwegian in order to read the works of Henrik Ibsen in the original language.

=== Making of a poet ===
At the age of nineteen, George and a few other students of the Gymnasium started a literary journal called Rosen und Disteln ("Roses and Thistles"). Here George published his first poems under the pseudonym Edmund Delorme. Even though the Gymnasium emphasized the poetry of the German Romantics, George taught himself Italian, in order to both read and translate the Renaissance poets whom he most revered. His first poems consisted of literary translations and imitations of the Italian poetry of Petrarch and Torquato Tasso.

When his schooling was concluded in 1888, it was clear to George and to his family that it would not work for him to follow the usual course into university, business, or the German civil service. Instead he began to travel.

He later told a friend, "Germany was intolerable then; just think of Nietzsche! I would have thrown a bomb if they had kept me here; or I would have perished like Nietzsche. My father was glad to get rid of me, for he sensed the danger."

Hoping to improve his grasp of English, George lived in London between May and October 1888. Queen Victoria was on the throne and London was still the capital of the global British Empire. George later recalled that in England he saw, "an expansive sense of life, borne by great political tasks and goals, an ancient cultural unity which carefully preserved traditions, a firmly moded way of life for all classes of the populace, a decorous politeness among all the people, phenomena which were no longer found in the Germany of those years, or which were just beginning to emerge."

It is also believed to have been during his time in London that George first encountered the English poetry the "honored masters" Dante Gabriel Rossetti, Algernon Charles Swinburne, and Ernest Dowson, whose works George would later translate into German and publish in his homeland.

While briefly returning to Germany and his parental home in Bingen, George expressed a desire to convene a "Congress" of like-minded poets and to publish a collection of their works.

This was an idea deeply rooted in both the Western Canon and in German literature, as Goethe, Schiller, and the other German Romantic poets had circles of adherents who gathered around them. Even before that, Friedrich Gottlieb Klopstock had referred to his closest friends as, die wenigen Edlen ("the noble few") and had made detailed plans for Die Gelehrtenrepublik ("The Republic of Scholars").

During his subsequent tours of Switzerland and northern Italy, George played the title role in a production of Moliere's Le Misanthrope performed at Montreux. George later recalled, "Can you imagine anything more contradictory than that I, the socialist, communard, atheist, should play in a comedy with a German baron in the house of a professor of theology surrounded by a whole bevy of society ladies?"

Suffering from severe loneliness, George arrived in Paris in May 1889. On his first day there, he met the French poet Albert Saint-Paul, through whom George was introduced into the city's literary bohemia. Despite the intensely anti-German revanchism reigning over French culture during the Belle Époque, George found himself "spontaneously accepted by his peers." Through Albert Saint-Paul, George was introduced to Paul Verlaine, Francis Vielé-Griffin, Albert Mockel, and Waclaw Rolicz-Lieder.

Saint-Paul also persuaded the poet Stéphane Mallarmé to invite George to attend the Tuesday Symbolist soirées held in, "that little room in the Rue de Rome". George had been described to Mallarmé as resembling "the young Goethe before Werther". When they met, Mallarmé received George warmly, particularly when the latter revealed that he had recently begun translating Charles Baudelaire's Les Fleurs du Mal into German.

Many years later, the members of Mallarmé's circle were to recall that they immediately identified Stefan George as, "a poet of unusual promise." Despite his confidence, George seemed extremely shy and rarely participated in the circle's discussions, preferring instead to listen and learn. Meanwhile, George also filled 365 pages with poems by French and other European authors, many of which he was later to translate into German.

According to the Metzgers, "For the Symbolists, the pursuit of 'art for art's sake' was a highly serious – nearly a sacred – function, since beauty, in and of itself, stood for a higher meaning beyond itself. In their ultimate higher striving, the French Symbolists are not far from the Platonic ideals of the Good, the True, and the Beautiful, and this idealistic aspect was undoubtedly what appealed to George far more than the Estheticism, the Bohemianism, and the apparent Nihilism so often superficially associated with this group."

Paul Verlaine and Stéphane Mallarmé were the only living poets whom George considered his superiors and whose apprentice he ever wished to be. Particularly Mallarmé, whose circle of disciples called him Le Maître ("The Master"), was to be a lifelong model for George's art, philosophy, and way of life.

The French Symbolists were every bit as enthusiastic for George, as is revealed by the evidence of their surviving letters and subsequent memoirs of his visit to Paris, which were published in a 1928 theme issue of the Revue d'Allemagne. George wrote in 1896, "Paris, the only place where I found and possess true friends."

At this time, George felt a very intense hostility to what he saw as the banality and philistinism of German culture during the German Empire. In his subsequent poem Franken ('Frankish Lands'), which celebrates his visit to Paris and "whose title recalls the original unity of Germany and France under Charlemagne", George denounced the militarism and expansionism of the Imperial Government, "the complacent materialism of the German middle class", and the hostility to German artists, poets, and intellectuals. George asked the German people, "Where is your bard, you proud and boastful race?" He then answered that there was no one, as the German people had driven Friedrich Nietzsche insane and forced Arnold Böcklin into exile. Even so, "Stefan George's experience in Paris during the early 1890's ... impelled him to return to Germany to give a new voice and form to German poetry."

=== Blätter für die Kunst ===
After returning to Germany, George first began to study Romance languages and their literature at Friedrich Wilhelm University in Berlin, where he remained for three semesters.

At the time, George had serious doubts about the ability of the German language to say what he wished to say in his poems. For this reason, he preferred instead to write French and Spanish poetry and even invented a language which he dubbed Lingua Romana, which combined words from Spanish and Latin with German syntax.

George also seriously considered emigrating to Mexico at the urging of a wealthy Mexican family he had met and befriended in Paris. When George saw the family off on a ship back to Mexico, he gave them a copy of the first collection of his poems in German, Hymnen ("Odes"), which had just been privately printed in a limited edition of 100 copies.

Also while living in Berlin, George joined forces with fellow student Carl August Klein to found the annual literary magazine entitled Blätter für die Kunst. At the time, George felt that German poets had been reduced to two main literary movements, both of which he opposed. The first was for a poet to be "a provider of a pleasant diversion", or as Arno Holz called such poetry, "a lilac-sweet spring rhapsode". The other role was for a poet to become a Naturalistic social critic, or what George sarcastically termed, "an apostle of reality". Stefan George and Carl Klein therefore intended for Blätter für die Kunst to be a vehicle for what they termed "the new art", which was intended to both build upon and supersede both literary movements within German poetry, while also drawing upon the ideas of the French Symbolists.

While George was not the first German poet to draw inspiration from the French Symbolists, he has been termed, "the most gifted, eloquent, and productive exponent of the poetic aspects of the movement in his homeland". George also, "did not slavishly follow any masters", but set his own stamp upon those aspects of Symbolism that he found appropriate for his purpose of revitalizing German culture and German literature.

George was the main person of the literary and academic group known as the George-Kreis ("George Circle"), which included some of the major, young writers of the time such as Friedrich Gundolf and Ludwig Klages. In addition to sharing cultural interests, the group promoted mystical and political themes. George knew and befriended the "Bohemian Countess" of Schwabing, Fanny zu Reventlow, who sometimes satirised the group for its melodramatic actions and opinions. George and his writings were identified with the Conservative Revolutionary philosophy. He was homosexual, yet exhorted his young friends to have a celibate life like his own.

=== Ida Coblenz ===
In 1892, George met Ida Coblenz, a wealthy and cultured German Jewish heiress who not only admired his poetry but also demonstrated deep insight into his work. Their meeting took place in Bingen am Rhein. Many of George’s poems in Preisgedichte (1895), Das Jahr der Seele (1897), and even Der siebente Ring (1907) were inspired by her. Years later, George told his friends that there had once been a woman who was "my world".

George saw Ida often, particularly in the fall of 1894 and the summer of 1896. Ida's brief and unhappy arranged marriage to Leopold Auerbach, a Jewish businessman from Berlin, did nothing to interrupt her relationship with George. When Ida, however, began a relationship with the married poet Richard Dehmel, whom she later married in 1901, George viewed Ida's decision as a betrayal of the worst order. Dehmel, due to his Marxism, Bohemianism, and "sensual glorification of life as it is", stood for everything that George detested in German poetry in Imperial Germany.

After meeting Dehmel before Coblenz's house in Bingen, George wrote to her, "Our [friendship] arises from the fact that each of us is able to communicate what he thinks great and noble to the other – it rises and falls with this ability – and disappears entirely when something appears great and noble to one which is brutal and debased to the other."

George had been planning to dedicate his 1897 poetry collection Das Jahr der Seele to Ida Coblenz. Instead, the name of George's sister was printed where that of Ida Coblenz was intended to have stood.

=== World War I and rise of the Nazi Party ===
During 1914, at the start of the World War, George foretold a sad end for Germany. In 1916, in a deliberate revolt against the jingoistic literary movement known as Hurrah-Patriotismus, which was overwhelmingly popular on the German home-front during the First World War, George wrote and published the pessimistic poem Der Krieg ('The War').

The outcome of the war was the realization of his worst fears. In the 1920s, George despised the culture of Germany, particularly its bourgeois mentality and archaic church rites. He wished to create a new, noble German culture, and offered "form", regarded as a mental discipline and a guide to relationships with others, as an ideal while Germany was in a period of social, political, spiritual and artistic decadence.

George's poetry was discovered by the small but ascendant Nationalsozialistische Deutsche Arbeiterpartei (NSDAP), i.e. Nazism, which had its roots in Bavaria. George's concepts of "the thousand year Reich" and "fire of the blood" were adopted by the NSDAP and incorporated into the party's propaganda. George would come to detest their racial theories, especially the notion of the "Nordic superman".

According to Peter Hoffmann, George "had a low opinion of Hitler, in whom he saw none of the greatness of a Caesar or a Napoleon". Shortly before Hitler became Chancellor on 30 January 1933, "the poet said that if the National Socialists came to power, everyone in Germany would have to wear a noose around his neck, and those who refused would be hanged immediately."

In February 1933, the Nazis began dismissing all of their political opponents as well as Jews from the Prussian Academy of the Arts; these included Thomas Mann, René Schickele, Georg Kaiser, and Franz Werfel. They were replaced with politically reliable "national writers", such as Hans Grimm and Hans Carossa (though Carossa was anti-Nazi).

By April 1933, George was referring to the National Socialists as "hangmen". He also assigned the youngest of his followers, Karl Josef Partsch, to talk Frank Mehnert out of joining any Nazi-affiliated organizations.

On 5 May 1933 the Prussian Minister for Sciences, Arts, and Public Education, Bernhard Rust, informed George that the new government wished to appoint him to an honorary position within the academy. Rust further explained that he intended to publicly describe George as the forefather of the Nazi Party's "national revolution", and also offered him a large sum of money to do with as he wished. If George was agreeable to the proposal, President Paul von Hindenburg or Chancellor Adolf Hitler would personally write the official letter.

On 10 May 1933 George replied by letter. He declined both the money and the honorary position "in the so-called academy", but said that he approved of its "national" orientation. George explained, however, that he had administered German literature for five decades without any need for an academy. On the other hand, George did not deny his "ancestorship of the new national movement and did not preclude his intellectual cooperation".

There were those within the Nazi Party, however, who were enraged by George's negative response to the offer, who suspected the sincerity of his claims of sympathy for the national revolution, and who even denounced George by calling him a Jew.

In order to renew his passport, George returned to his native Bingen am Rhein at the beginning of July 1933, but left for Berlin-Dahlem just four days before his 65th birthday. Some historians believe that this was a deliberate effort to evade official honors from the new government. However, the new Government made no further efforts beyond a personal telegram of congratulations from Propaganda Minister Joseph Goebbels.

=== Death in exile ===
On 25 July 1933 George travelled to Wasserburg on Lake Constance, where he remained for four weeks. He was joined there at various times by Frank Mehnert, Berthold von Stauffenberg, Claus von Stauffenberg, and other younger members of the George-Kreis.

On 24 August 1933 George took a ferry across the lake to Heiden, Switzerland. Although George had chosen to make the journey to escape the humid lakeside air and had spent the previous two winters at Minusio, George later said, in an example of his "mild political humor", that in the middle of the lake he began to breathe far more easily.

Berthold von Stauffenberg arrived at Minusio on 27 September 1933, shortly after having attended the wedding at Bamberg of his brother Claus to Baroness Nina von Lerchenfeld, and found George feeling very weak and devoid of appetite.

That same month, however, George declared that both his way of life and his friendships were sufficient proof of his tolerance and indifference to all religions.

In November 1933, Frank Mehnert spread the news that George's medical condition was very grave. Mehnert, Robert Boehringer, Walter Kempner, and Clotilde Schlayer took turns keeping vigil at his hospital bedside. When Karl Josef Partsch, Albrecht von Blumenthal, Walter Anton, Ludwig Thormaehlen, and the three Stauffenberg brothers also arrived, they were allowed a brief glimpse of George in his darkened room; but the poet was not aware of their presence.

George died at Minusio on 4 December 1933. Although Berthold von Stauffenberg, Thormaehlen, Anton, Blumenthal, and others wished to return his body to Germany for burial, Boehringer, as the poet's heir, overruled them by quoting George's own words: "A man should be buried where he dies." In response, the George-Kreis decided to inter him locally. Claus von Stauffenberg organized the wake in accordance with the customs of the Italian-speaking Canton of Ticino and the George-Kreis kept constant vigil at the Minusio cemetery chapel until the morning of 6 December 1933.

On 5 December the German Consulate at Lugano contacted the city officials of Minusio and asked for the date and time of the funeral. The George-Kreis replied that the funeral would be at 3pm on 6 December but added that mourners from outside the Circle were not wanted. Just in case, the funeral was then secretly rescheduled for 8:15 on the morning of 6 December. Boehringer, however, disapproved of the deception and quietly informed Baron Ernst von Weizsäcker, the German Minister at Bern, that he could deliver a wreath to the grave on the day after the funeral.

Twenty-five members of the George-Kreis, including Jewish members Ernst Morwitz and Karl Wolfskehl, attended the funeral. The laurel wreath later delivered by the German Foreign Office bore a swastika printed on a white ribbon. This subsequently caused a running battle within the Circle between those, like Clotilde Schlayer, who repeatedly chose to remove it and other members who kept replacing it with new swastika ribbons. As the mourners left the railroad station at Locarno following the ceremony, some of the younger members of the George-Kreis were seen to give the Nazi salute.

According to the Metzgers, "When Stefan George died in 1933, there was a grim dissonance between the eulogies from inside and outside Germany, the former claiming George as the prophet of the Third Reich, which had taken power that year, the latter often interpreting his silence as expressing his utter contempt for the new regime."

== Literary achievements ==
From the inception of the Circle, George and his followers represented a literary and cultural revolt against the literary realism trend in German literature during the last decades of the German Empire.

George was also a highly important intermediary between 19th century German Romanticism and literary realism and the 20th-century Expressionist and Modernist poetry of Rainer Maria Rilke, August Stramm, Reinhard Sorge, and Berthold Brecht. Even though George was, like his fellow war poets Siegfried Sassoon, Hedd Wyn, and Wilfred Owen, a very harsh critic of his own era, he was also very much a man of his own time.

George's poetry is characterized by an aristocratic ethos; his verse is formal in style, lyrical in tone, and often arcane in language, being influenced by Greek classical forms. By both emulating and building upon the literary language of the German Romantics and Biedermeier poets, "Stefan George's poetry", according to Peter Hoffmann, "helped to form modern literary German." He also experimented with various poetic metres, punctuation, obscure allusions and typography.

Believing that the purpose of poetry was to create an alternative to reality ‍—‌ he was a strong advocate of art for art's sake ‍—‌ George's beliefs about poetry were drawn from the French Symbolist poets and he considered himself to be both the student and the successor of Stéphane Mallarmé and Paul Verlaine.

Stefan George's "evident homosexuality" is represented by works such as Algabal and the love poetry he devoted to a gifted adolescent of his acquaintance named Maximilian Kronberger, whom he called "Maximin", and whom he believed to be a manifestation of the divine. The relevance of George's sexuality to his poetic work has been discussed by contemporary critics, such as Thomas Karlauf and Marita Keilson-Lauritz.

Algabal is one of George's best remembered collections of poetry, if also one of his strangest; the title is a reference to the effete Roman emperor Elagabalus. George was also an important translator; he translated Dante, Shakespeare and Baudelaire into German.

George was awarded the inaugural Goethe Prize in 1927.

=== Das neue Reich ===
George's last complete book of poems, Das neue Reich ('"The New Realm"'), was published in 1928. It was banned in Occupied Germany after World War II, as the title sounded tainted by Nazism. But George had dedicated the work, which includes the lyric "Geheimes Deutschland" ('"Secret Germany"') written in 1922, to Berthold Schenk Graf von Stauffenberg, who, with his brother Claus, took a leading role in the 20 July plot to assassinate Adolf Hitler and overthrow the Nazi Party. Both brothers, who were executed after the plot had failed, considered themselves to be acting on the teachings of George by trying to kill Hitler and put an end to Nazism. The book describes a new form of society ruled by a hierarchical spiritual aristocracy. George rejected all attempts to use it for mundane political purposes, including those of Nazism.

== Influence ==
In a view inspired by the German Romantic poets and the French Symbolists, George and his followers saw him as the monarch of a separate government of Germany, composed of his intellectual and artistic disciples, bonded by their faithfulness to "The Master" and to a common vision. In his memoirs, Albert Speer claims to have met George during the early 1920s and that his elder brother, Hermann, was an acquaintance of George's: George "radiated dignity and pride and a kind of priestliness ... there was something magnetic about him."

George's poetry emphasized self-sacrifice, heroism, and power, which won him the approval of the National Socialists. Though many Nazis claimed George as an influence, George remained aloof from such associations. Soon after the Nazi seizure of power, George left Germany for Switzerland where he died the same year.

Some of the members of the 20 July plot against Hitler were drawn from among his devotees, notably the Stauffenberg brothers who were introduced to George by the poet and classical scholar Albrecht von Blumenthal. Although some members of the George circle were avowedly anti-semitic (for example, Klages), the Circle also included Jewish authors such as Gundolf, the historian Ernst Kantorowicz, the Zionist Karl Wolfskehl, and Erich Berger. George was fond of his Jewish disciples, but he expressed reservations about their ever becoming a majority in the group.

George's influence on Ernst Kantorowicz was decisive in the latter's controversial biography of Holy Roman Emperor Frederick II, which was published in 1927. The book's account of Frederick II and his "dynamic personality and ability to shape the Empire according to a higher vision seemed to sum up the aspirations of the George Circle." George is even reported to have "carefully corrected" the manuscript and saw that it was published.

One of George's most well known collaborators was Hugo von Hofmannsthal, a leading literary modernist in the Austro-Hungarian Empire. Hofmannsthal, however, refused membership in the group. Later in life, Hofmannsthal wrote that no one had influenced him more than George. Those closest to the "Master," as George had his disciples call him, included several members of the 20 July plot to assassinate Hitler, among them Claus von Stauffenberg himself. Stauffenberg frequently quoted George's poem "Der Widerchrist" ('"The Anti-Christ"') to his fellow members of the 20 July plot.

=== In music and film ===
Stefan George's poetry was a major influence upon the 20th-century classical music composed by the Second Viennese School, particularly during their Expressionist period.

Radically innovative Austrian Jewish composer Arnold Schoenberg set George's poetry to music in the "Ich darf nicht dankend an dir niedersinken", Op. 14/1 (1907), String Quartet No. 2, Op. 10 (1908), and in The Book of the Hanging Gardens, Op. 15 (1909). Arnold Schoenberg's student Anton Webern also set George's poetry to music in his early choral work Entflieht auf leichten Kähnen, Op. 2. Webern did the same in two other sets of songs, Op. 3 and 4 of 1909, and in several posthumously published vocal compositions from the same period.

Rainer Werner Fassbinder's 1976 comedy film Satan's Brew pokes fun at both Stefan George and the George-Kreis.

== Works ==
- 1890: Hymnen ('Odes'), 18 poems written reflecting Symbolism; dedicated to Carl August Klein; limited, private edition
- 1891: Pilgerfahrten ('Pilgrimages'); limited, private edition
- 1892: Algabal, illustrated by Melchior Lechter; limited, private edition
- 1895: Die Bücher der Hirten- und Preisgedichte, der Sagen und Sänge, und der hängenden Gärten ('The Books of Eclogues and Eulogies, of Legends and Lays, and of the Hanging Gardens')
- 1897: Das Jahr der Seele ('The Year of the Soul')
- 1899: Teppich des Lebens ('The Tapestry of Life')
- 1900: Hymnen, Pilgerfahrten, and Algabal, a one-volume edition published in Berlin by Georg Bondi which first made George's work available to the public at large
- 1901: Die Fibel ('Primer'), poems written from 1886 to 1889
- 1903: Tage und Taten ('Days and Works'; cf. Hesiod's Works and Days)
- 1907: Der siebente Ring ('The Seventh Ring')
- 1913: Der Stern des Bundes ('The Star of the Covenant')
- 1917: Der Krieg ('The War')
- 1928: Das neue Reich ('The Kingdom Come')
