= Native Americans in German popular culture =

Romanticised culture

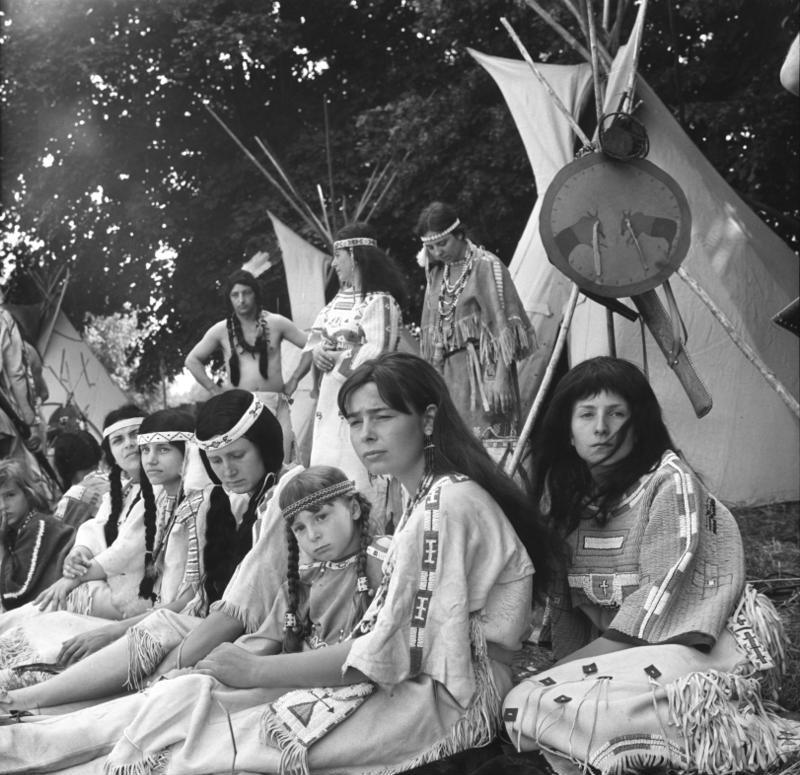
East Germans portraying Native Americans at an event in Leipzig, 1970

Since the 18^{th} century, Native Americans have been a topic of fascination in German culture, inspiring literature, art, film and historical reenactment, as well as influencing German ideas and attitudes towards environmentalism. Hartmut Lutz coined the term Indianthusiasm for this phenomenon.

These Native Americans are largely portrayed in a romanticized, idealized, and fantasy-based manner, that relies on historicised, stereotypical depictions of Plains Indians, rather than the contemporary realities facing the real, and diverse, Indigenous peoples of the Americas. Sources written by German people, for example, Karl May, are prioritised over those by Native American peoples themselves.

In 1985, Lutz invented the term Deutsche Indianertümelei ("German Indian Enthusiasm") for the phenomenon. The phrase Indianertümelei is a reference to the German term Deutschtümelei ("German Enthusiasm") which mockingly describes the phenomenon of celebrating in an excessively nationalistic and romanticized manner Deutschtum ("Germanness"). It has been connected with German ideas of tribalism, nationalism and Kulturkampf.

== Background ==
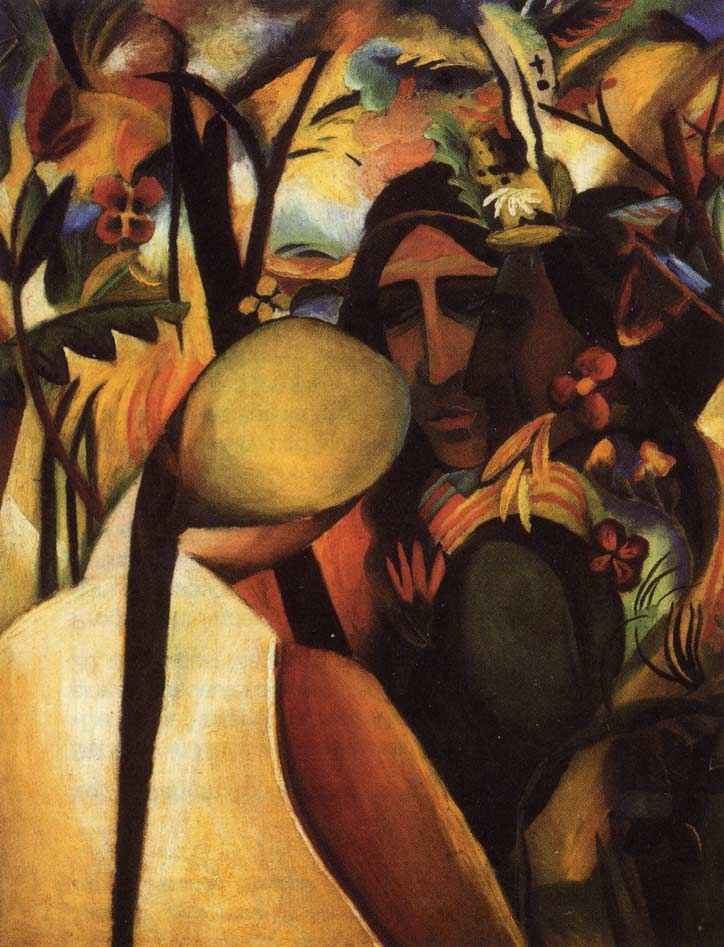
Indianer by August Macke

=== Projections of sentiments ===
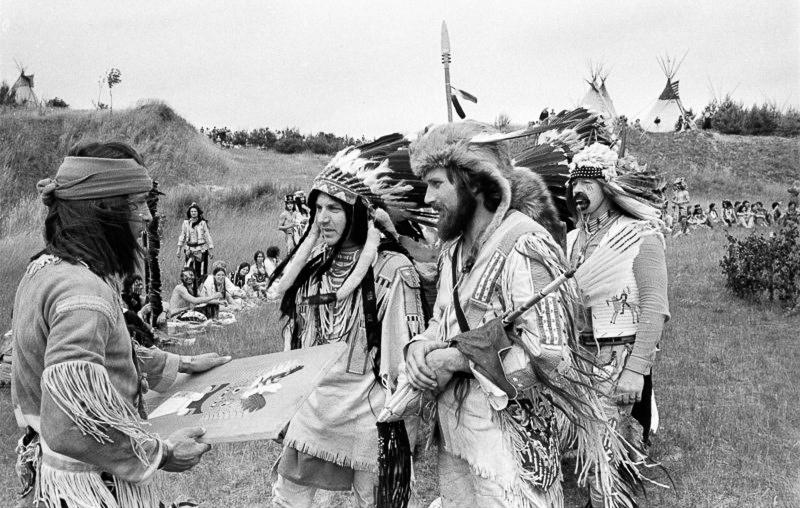
East Germans at an Indianistikmeeting in Schwerin, 1982

H. Glenn Penny states a striking sense, for over two centuries, of affinity among Germans for their ideas of what American Indians are like. According to him, those affinities stem from German polycentrism, notions of tribalism, longing for freedom, and a melancholy sense of "shared fate." In the 17th and 18th centuries, German intellectuals' image of Native Americans was based on earlier heroes such as those of the Greeks, the Scythians, or the Polish struggle for independence (as in Polenschwärmerei) as a base for their projections. The then popular recapitulation theory on the evolution of ideas was also involved. Such sentiments underwent ups and downs. Philhellenism, rather strong around 1830, faced a setback when the actual Greeks did not fulfill the classic ideals.

Antisemitism and pro-Indian stances did not necessarily exclude each other in Germany. In the 1920s, Anton Kuh's mockery of a contrast between Asphalt und Scholle (asphalt and clod), urban literature referred to metropolitan Jews and rural-inspired Heimatschutz writings.

Much of German nationalism glorified ideas of "tribalism", using heroes of Germanic mythology and folklore such as Sigurd and Arminius, and attempting to position itself as an alternative role model to the colonial empires of the time (and the Roman past) by trying to convey the ideal of a colonizer loved by the colonized. After 1880, Catholic publishers had a specific role in publicizing Karl May's fictional Indian stories. The way May described Native Americans was seen as helpful to better integrate German Catholics, which were "a tribe on their own" and faced Kulturkampf controversies with the Protestant dominated authorities and elite. H. Glenn Penny's Kindred By Choice treats the image and changing role of masculinity connected to Indians in Germany besides a (mutually assumed) longing for freedom and a melancholy sense of shared doom.

Johann Gottfried Seume (1763–1810) was among the Hessian auxiliaries contracted by the British Crown for military service in Canada and wrote about his encounters with Native Americans in his autobiography. His admiration for naturality and a description of a Huron as a noble but sort of frank man is part of his poem "Der Wilde" (the savage) which became well known in Germany. Seume is also among the first to use the words "Canada" and Kultur (culture) in today's meaning in German.

Seume's Huron has stereotypical characteristics used as well for Germanic people of old – he drinks mead and wears a bear skin and uses a sort of blunt didactic on an unfriendly European settler. Seume had actually met some Mi'kmaq, but in his poems he used tribe names with symbolic significance. Hurons (Wyandot people) stood in the contemporary poetry for the noble savage, Mohawks for the brute.

=== Wandervogel and youth movement ===
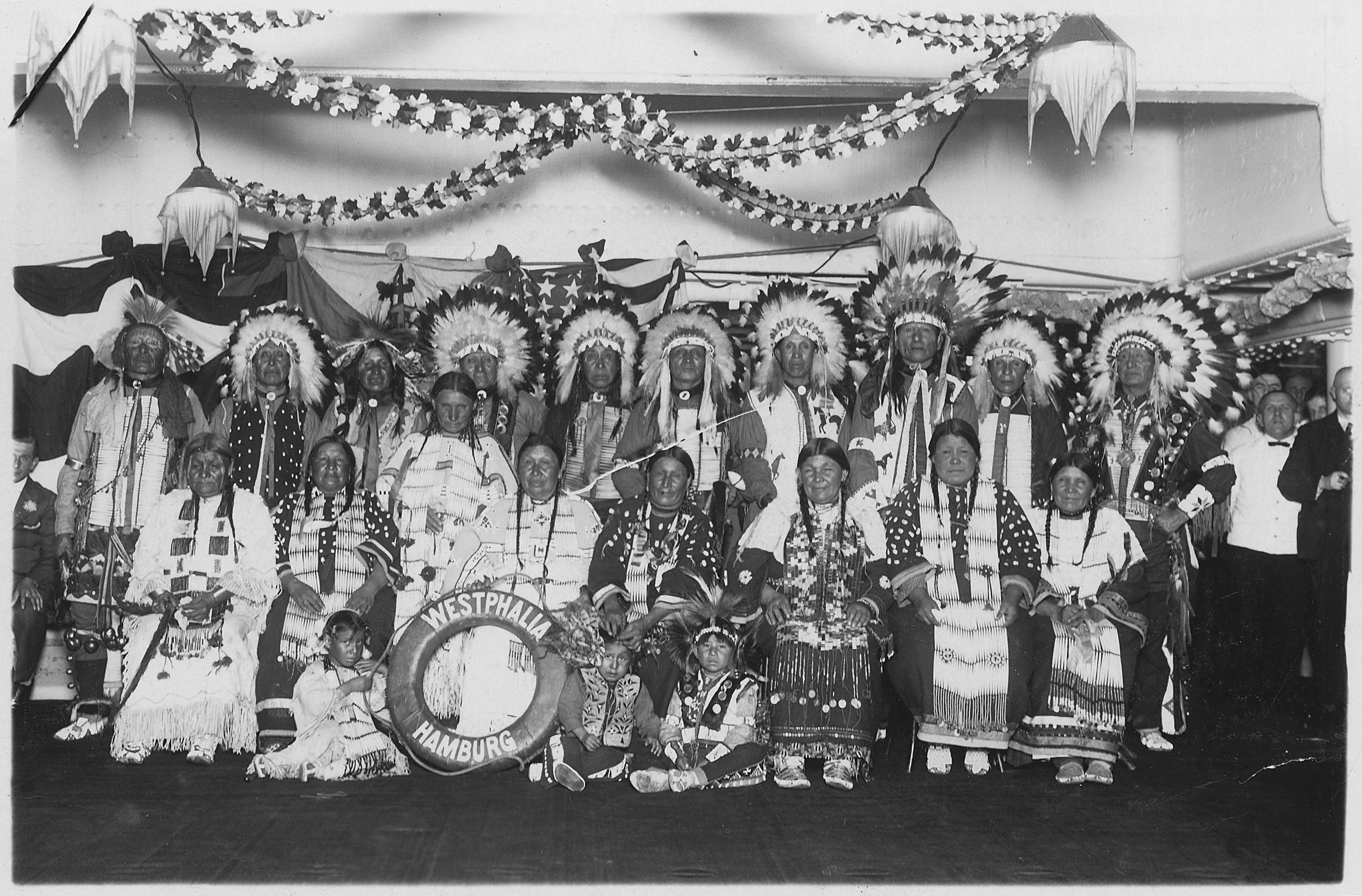
A group photo of Circus Sarrasani Sioux on board the steamship Westphalia

The German Empire saw the rise of the German youth movement, especially the Wandervogel, as an antimodern culture criticism. The German image of Indians again projected German beliefs and dreams about a bucolic past onto them. Authenticity, living free and close to nature, was among those aims. It closely interacted with outdoor meetings, games, songs and even commercial Wild West shows, as by Buffalo Bill and other various media. Austrian Christian Feest attributes the popularity of the Indian in the German youth movement to the then all-European impact of late-19th-century human zoos.

The first actual Indians came to Germany in the 19th century. Kah-ge-ga-ga-bow, an Ojibwa born in 1819, baptized as Reverend George Copway, took part in the 1850 World Peace Congress at St. Paul's Church, Frankfurt am Main. The image of the warrior turned Christian went down well with the public and Copway became a media star in Germany. Henry Wadsworth Longfellow recommended him to the leftist poet Ferdinand Freiligrath.

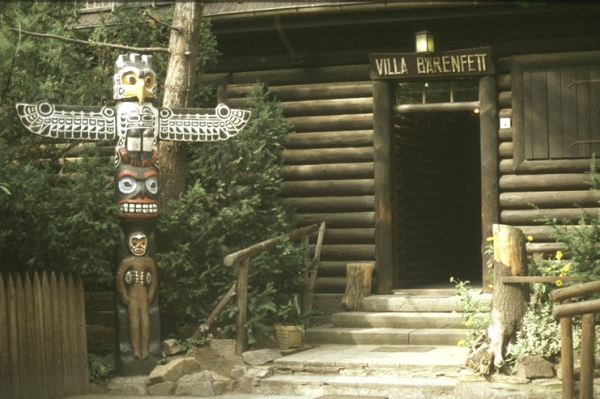
The Bärenfett Radebeul Villa; entrance to the Indian collection

Other Native Americans arrived with human zoos and took part in shows in zoological gardens and circuses. In 1879, Carl Hagenbeck (1844–1913) engaged among others some Iroquois for a show in Dresden. Painter and author Rudolf Cronau, a personal friend of Sitting Bull, invited members of the Hunkpapa Lakota, who came to Europe in 1886. Buffalo Bill's European shows in 1890 and between 1903 and 1907 involved several hundred Indians and were quite popular in Germany. Edward Two-Two, a Lakota-Sioux, worked at the Sarrasani circus in Dresden in 1913/14 and was buried there in 1914 according to his wishes.

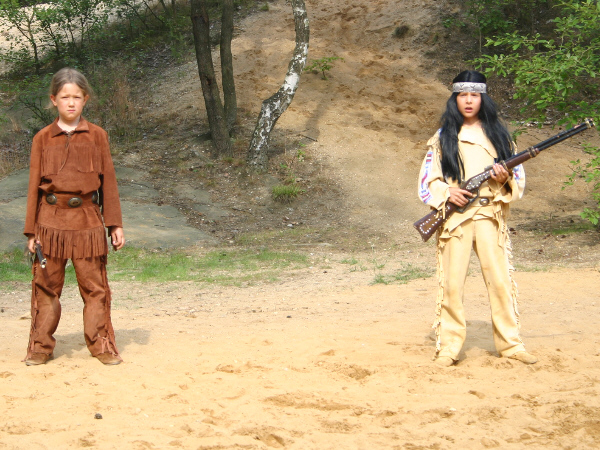
Karl-May-Spiele Bischofswerda: Winnetou and Old Shatterhand in the "blood brothers" bonding scene

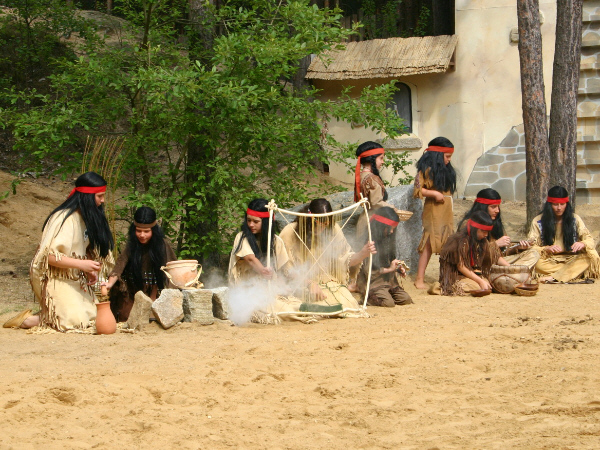
Karl-May-Spiele Bischofswerda: German actors playing Apaches

== Karl May ==
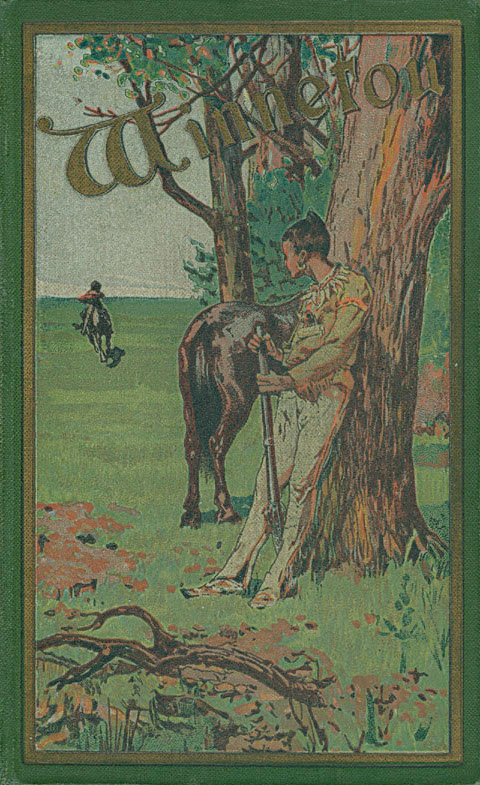
Winnetou book cover, 1898

A strong influence on the German imagination of Native Americans is the work of Karl May (1842–1912), who wrote various novels about the American Wild West which relied upon, and further developed, this romantic image. May is among the most successful German writers. As of 2012, about 200 million copies of May's novels have been sold, half of them in Germany. He is among the most popular authors of formula fiction in the German language. These specifically German fantasies and projections about Indianer have influenced generations of Germans. Indianer refers to Native Americans in the United States, and also to natives of the Pacific, Central and Latin America, and "Red Indians" in the stereotypical sense.

Karl May found admirers among such different personalities as Ernst Bloch, Peter Handke and Adolf Hitler, but has almost no presence in English-speaking countries. His most famous books, mainly about the Wild West with a fictional Apache, Winnetou, among the main characters, were at first deemed 19th-century pulp fiction. Winnetou was described by some as "an apple Indian" (outside red, inside white).

Karl May never visited America, or had any direct contact with Native American people, before he wrote these influential works. May drew his inspiration among other sources from Balduin Möllhausen, who had traveled in the Rocky Mountains in 1850 with Duke Paul Wilhelm of Württemberg, and George Catlin's reports, which were popular in Germany.

Gojko Mitić became famous playing Red Indians in various films for the East German company DEFA, such as The Sons of Great Bear, and was popular in the Eastern bloc. The Karl May festivals (in East and West Germany) gain interest by real Indian guests and partners in the meantime. In 2006, the cultural authority of the Mescalero Apaches and the Karl-May-Haus in Hohenstein-Ernstthal made an agreement to cooperate. Films based on May's Winnetou novels were shot from 1962 to 1968, starring Pierre Brice. A parodistic adaptation of the genre, the 2001 comedy Der Schuh des Manitu, was among the biggest box office hits in Germany. Bravo, Germany's largest teen magazine, awards an annual prize, the Bravo-Otto, in the form of a classic Karl May Indian.

=== Spiritual and esoteric aspects ===
At the end of the 19th century, there was a widespread notion of a coming new humanity, building on then-current esoteric myths such as those of Helena Blavatsky and Rudolf Steiner as well as on popularly accepted philosophy such as Nietzsche's Übermensch. May was no esoteric, but a devout (Protestant) Christian, published by Catholic publishing houses. He used Winnetou and other protagonists (Winnetou's mentor Klekih-Petra, a former German 48^{er}, became a member of the Apache tribe) less as 'apple Indians' than as personifications of his dream of a German-Native American synthesis based on shared Christian faith.

According to Mays' vision "in place of the Yankees, a new man will emerge whose soul is German-Indian". This approach is found both in his later novels, such as Winnetou IV, and in public speeches, such as his last speech, given in 1912 and titled "Empor ins Reich der Edelmenschen" (Ascend to the empire of noble men).

Austrian novelist Robert Müller's 1915 Tropen. Der Mythos der Reise. Urkunden eines deutschen Ingenieurs (Tropics, The myth of travel) is an important early example of a German exotic novel. Here, as in May, the Indians are not just projections of what white Europeans had been (in a mere racist outline of unilineal evolution), but also of what they should be in the future, on a higher level.

== Role of the noble warrior image ==
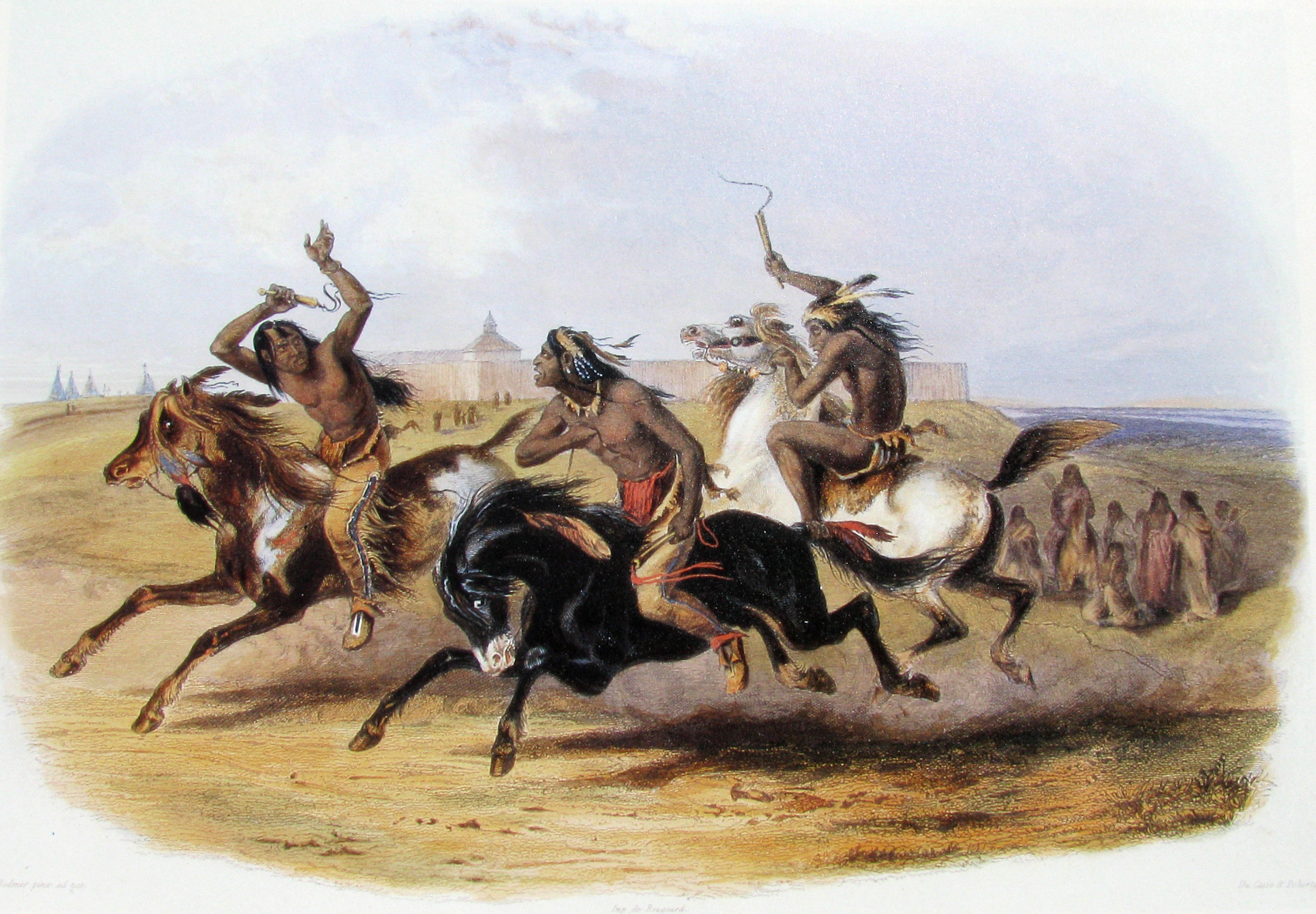
Karl Bodmer, Horse Racing of the Sioux c. 1836

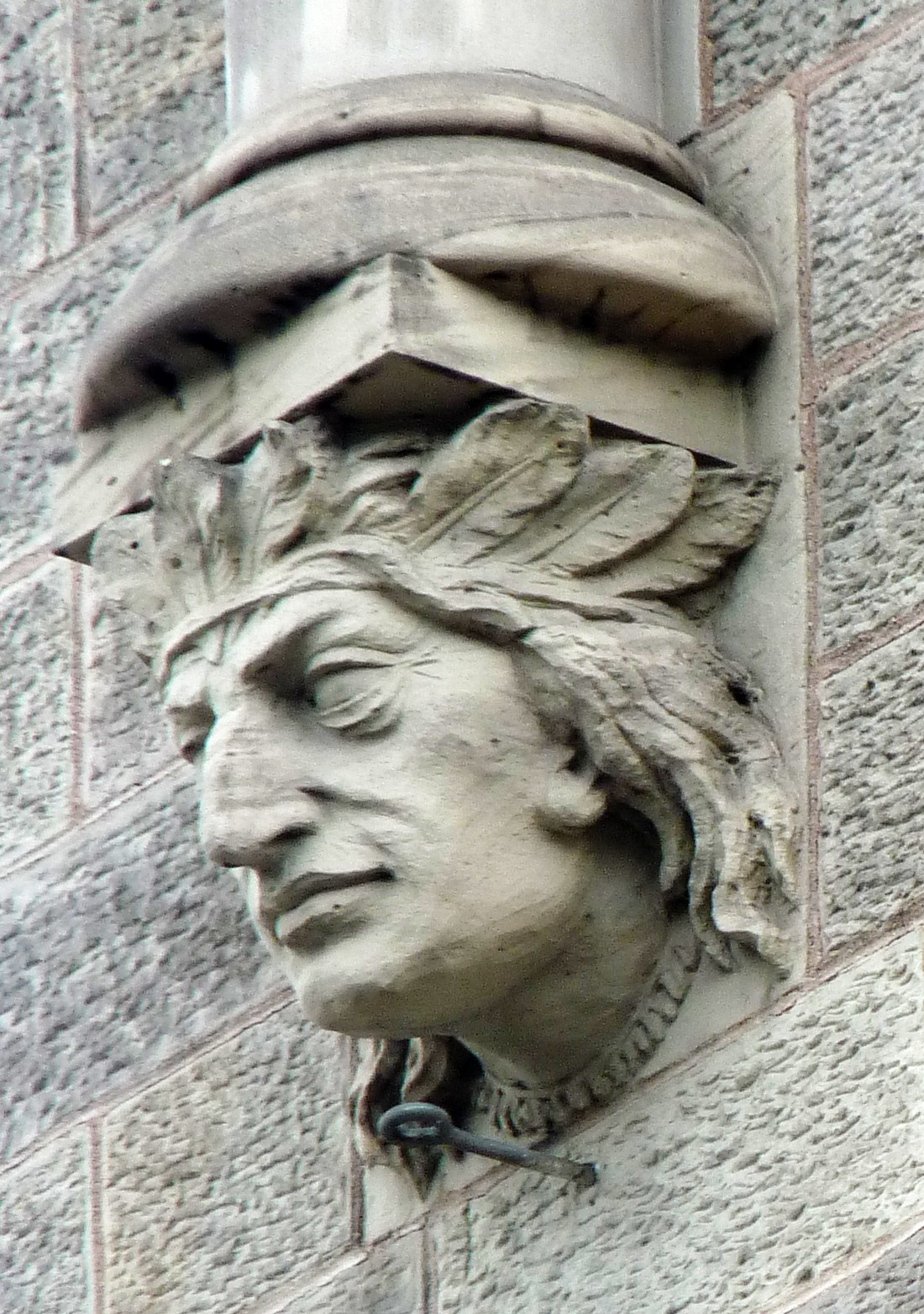
Stereotypical plains Indian warrior at the 1896 Wilheminian main post office in Strasbourg

Prior to European contact, the Native American population is estimated to have been in the millions. By 1880, the population had been severely impacted mainly by disease brought by the colonists as well as wars and violence. The destruction of communities and culture gave rise to the idea of the "Vanishing Indian". Theories about the rise and fall of human races, in and beyond Germany, were rather popular in the late 19th century, as a part of science and the eugenics movement, and in esoteric writings by authors such as Helena Blavatsky.

Friedrich Nietzsche's popular, The Gay Science praised endurance of pain as a prerequisite of true philosophy. Nietzsche drew parallels between his ideas of contemporary Indians and his preference for Pre-Socratic philosophy and "pre-civilized", "pre-rational" thinking. The romantic image of the noble savage or "seasoned warrior" took hold on Wilhelminian Germany; phrases that originated in this period, such as "An Indian knows no pain" [sic] (Ein Indianer kennt keinen Schmerz), are still in use today, for example to console children at the dentist's.

The German approach was somewhat different from the Social Darwinism taking place in the majority of American society at the time, as the German stereotypes were more idealized than denigrating. According to Philip J. Deloria, Americans also perpetrated the same, problematic idealization in a parallel tradition of Playing Indian – simultaneously mimicking stereotypical ideas and imagery of "Indians" and "Indianness", while also dismissing, and making invisible real, contemporary Indian people.

In Germany and America, these hobbyists idealize these archaic and "back to the roots" stereotypes of Native Americans. Stefan George, a charismatic networker and author, saw and studied Indians as role models of his own cosmogony, using ecstatic and unmediated experiences to provide a sacred space for himself and his disciples.

The Munich Cosmic Circle, an enlarged (compare Fanny zu Reventlow) circle of followers beyond the all-male Georgekreis, became and made Munich famous for its lavish parties and happenings ante litteram. George has been quoted with "Nietzsche may have known the Greek philosophers, but I am aware about the (Red) Indians".

In World War I, about 15,000 Native Americans served in the Allied Forces as members of the United States and Canadian armies. Both their own comrades and the enemy shared the stereotypical image of them as a "vanishing race" but with a strong warrior spirit. German soldiers feared Indian snipers, messengers and shock troops and the Allied troops were already using Indian languages via "windtalkers" to encode open communication. World War I propaganda claimed to be quoting a Cherokee soldier, Jo Fixum, with stereotypical, improbable, and offensive language features.

[Kaiser Wilhelm II] killum papoose und killum squaw, so Jo Fixum will find this Kaiser and stickum bayonet clear through. Ugh! [sic]

— Britten, p. 100

By 1940, the Indigenous population in the USA had risen to about 334,000. Because the German government was aware of the Indian communications specialists' abilities, their agents tried to use anthropologists as spies on reservations to subvert the cultures of some Indian tribes and learn their languages. The pro-Nazi German American Bund tried to persuade Indians not to register for the draft, for example using the swastika with some Native Americans as a symbol depicting good luck in order to gain sympathy.

The attempts may have backfired. During World War II, more than 44,000 Native Americans joined the military service, e.g. the 45th Infantry Division, and had all Americans enlisted in similar numbers and with such fervor, conscription would have not been necessary. Indian participation in World War II was extensive, and became part of American folklore and popular culture.

Johnny Cash's recording of "The Ballad of Ira Hayes", which commemorates the Pima Marine of the title who was one of the six men who raised the American flag on Iwo Jima, also became popular in Germany. Like Cash himself, who had been a G.I. in Bavaria, soldiers formerly or currently based in Germany played a role in German-Native American relations. Veterans are highly honored in most Native American communities, and many who serve in tribal government are veterans.

Since 1945, more Native Americans have set foot in Germany – many through US Army bases, and others due to business or educational reasons. The Native American Association of Germany, formed in 1994, provides resources and contact between Native Americans in Germany, greater Europe and the USA.

== "Indianthusiasm" (Indianertümelei), hobbyists and politics ==
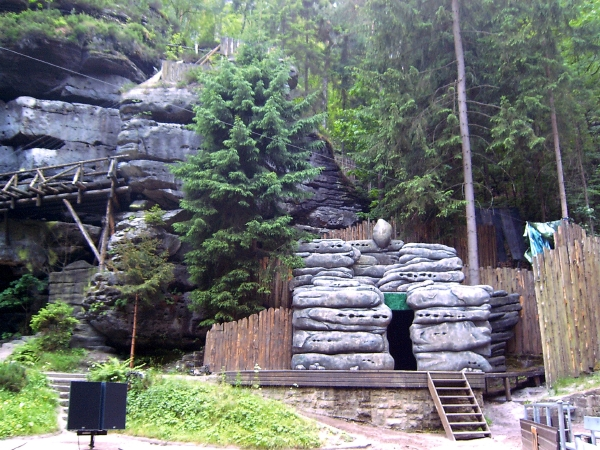
Rathen Open Air Stage had a völkisch origin

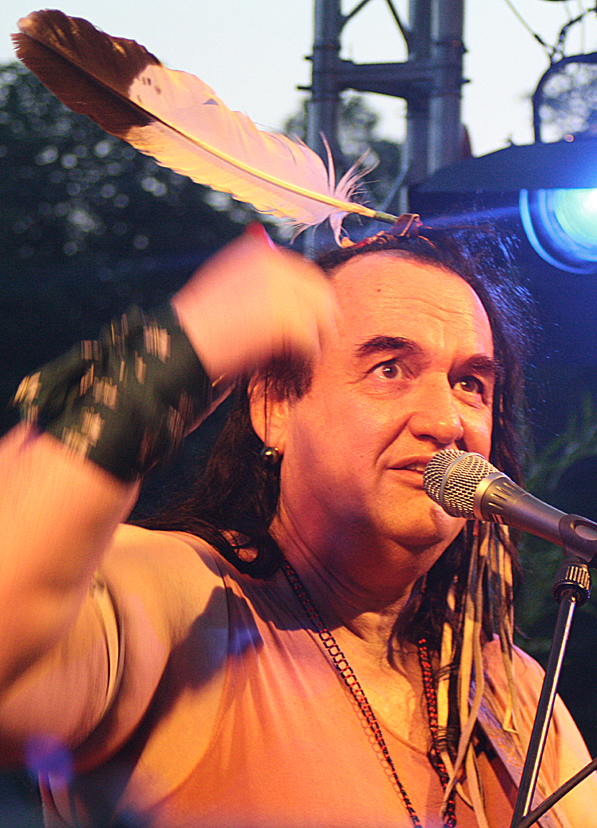
Willy Michl, who calls himself an "Isar Indian", Munich, 2010

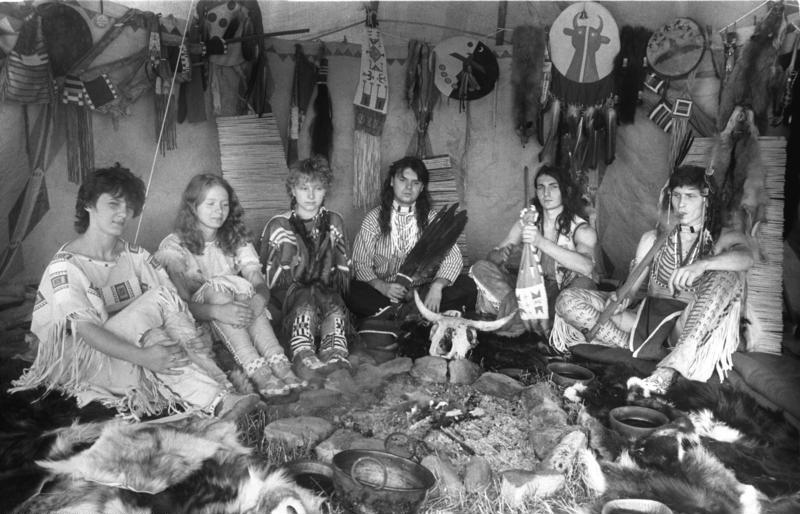
Czechoslovaks portraying Indians in a kohte, 30th anniversary of the Triptis Indianistik meeting, 1988

There was a widespread cultural passion for Native Americans in Germany throughout the 19th and 20th centuries. "Indianthusiasm" (German: Indianertümelei) contributed to the evolution of German national identity. Long before German unification in 1871, it had been widely assumed in German nationalist circles that a unified Reich would also have a colonial empire, and many of the debates at the proto-parliament in Frankfurt in 1848-49 concerned colonialist ambitions.

In the late 19th century, a recurring complaint in Germany was that the Reich had a relatively small colonial empire compared to other nations, especially the United Kingdom. As a result, "Indianthusiasm" served as a sort of Handlungsersatz-an untranslatable term meaning a surrogate for an action that substitutes for real power. Many of the colonial adventure stories in 19th century Germany had as their theme "stories of sexual conquest and surrender, love and blissful domestic relations between colonizer and colonized, set in colonial territory, stories that made the strange familiar and the familiar 'familial'".

A recurring theme of "Indianthusiasm" suggested that German immigrants would be act in a morally superior manner towards the indigenous population of North America than the "Anglo-Saxon" powers of Great Britain, Canada and the United States; this theme also promoted the idea that Germans held a genuine interest in Native American culture that other Europeans lacked.

A popular theme of Indianthusiasm novels in Imperial Germany were stories of German immigrants settling in rugged places such as the wilderness of Canada, where Auslandsdeutschtum ("Germanness abroad") served as a "civilizing force" that tamed the wilderness while also simultaneously offered up a very romanticized picture of the Indigenous inhabitants of Canada as "noble savages". The idealized picture of Indigenous Canadians as having an innate moral nobility served as a critique of modernity.

Most notably, the image of Indigenous Canadians as "noble, but dying races" suffering from the "cruel misrule" of the British Empire not only allowed the authors of these books to portray the Germans as better colonizers than the British, but also allowed them to resolve the dilemma that the "civilizing process" begun by German immigrants and celebrated in these novels also meant the end of the traditional lifestyles of Indigenous Canadians by putting the latter down to the British.

Imagery of Native Americans was appropriated in Nazi propaganda and used both against the US and to promote a "holistic understanding of Nature" among Germans, which gained widespread support from various segments of the political spectrum in Germany. The connection between anti-American sentiment and sympathetic feelings toward the underprivileged but authentic Indians is common in Germany, and it was to be found among both Nazi propagandists such as Goebbels and left-leaning writers such as Nikolaus Lenau as well. During the German Autumn in 1977, an anonymous text by a leftist Göttinger Mescalero spoke "with secret joy" (klammheimliche Freude) of the murder of German attorney general Siegfried Buback and used the positive image of Stadtindianer (Urban Indians) within the radical left.

In his book on the topic, Indianthusiasm, scholar Hartmut Lutz states that after the Second World War, Indianthusisam served as a surrogate for guilt about the Holocaust. After 1945, the "Wild West" of the 19th century became a historical zone in German popular imagination where it was the victors in World War II who were committing genocide. The 19th century "Wild West" became for Germans in the 1950s-1960s a "distant, vaguely defined past" where it was the Americans who were perpetuating genocide while German immigrants to the United States like May's hero Old Shatterhand became the ones who were trying to stop the genocide.

There was an implicit tu quoque argument to Indianthusisam in West Germany that Allied nations such as the United States had also committed genocide in the 19th century with the obvious conclusion that therefore there was no reason for the Germans to feel especially guilty about the Holocaust. In East Germany, this message was made explicit where policies of the United States government towards Indians in the 19th century were linked to capitalism, and therefore the treatment of American Indians supposedly showed the brutal, rapacious and genocidal nature of American capitalism and imperialism.

In East Germany, the frequency of films devoted to the subject of the Indians led to the term Indianerfilme being coined to describe the genre. In the East German Indianerfilme, the Americans were always the villains while the Indians were always the heroes. More recently, Indianthusiasm has been linked to the rise of environmentalism in Germany, where the traditional lifestyles of the Indians is portrayed in a romantic manner as superior to modern industrial civilization of the West.

=== Karl May festivals during the Nazi period ===
In 1938, the first outdoor Karl May festivals took place at the Rathen Open Air Stage. The open-air theatre was laid out in 1936, inspired by the ideas of the Thingspiele movement, which was active in the early stages of the Nazi period. The Thingspiele movement failed in staging neopagan and Nordic mythical aspects of the völkisch movement, while May's all-Christian legends found more approval with the mainstream.

=== Communist interpretations ===
The Communist East German government had major problems with the mixed heritage of May's works: his strong Christian leanings and his broad support, including on the political right. His books were not available for a long time, and "indianistic" reenactors were closely monitored by the security forces. The Communist authorities tried to integrate the movement into the socialist world view. Some prominent communist philosophers, such as Karl Marx' friend and sponsor Friedrich Engels, had used Native American tribal structures as examples for theories on family, private property, and the state. Engels contributed to the controversy about whether the Native American tribes actually had a notion of private property before the Columbian age. Indianerenthusiasm is now also being found in Russia.

=== West German interpretations ===
In West Germany, May's heritage was less problematic; both the books and the festivals were soon copied and reprinted. The Karl May Festival in Bad Segeberg overtook its predecessor in Rathen, as the GDR officials discontinued the tradition there. The Federal Republic experienced some aspects of an idealized Indian image during the Protests of 1968 and the related generation and in the founding phase of Die Grünen and NGOs like Greenpeace, which have a strong influence in Germany. Cultural critics tended to depict Indians positively to criticize Western society while conflicts of and with actual Native Americans over issues such as fur hunting, slavery, forest fire triggering, non-sustainable practices such as buffalo jumps, seal clubbing and whaling were neglected. The positive image, however, also influenced the self-image of actual Indians.

=== Hobbyists ===
Native American hobbyism in Germany, also called Indian Hobbyism, or Indianism, is the performance and attempt at historical reenactment of the American Indian culture of the early contact period, rather than the way contemporary Indigenous peoples of the Americas live. The cultures imitated are usually a romantic stereotype of Plains Indian cultures, with widely varying degrees of accuracy; influenced by the stereotypes seen in Hollywood Westerns. Some of the early to mid 20th century hobbyists gained widespread acclaim as selftaught experts in anything pertaining to the subjects of Native Americana, particularly the Zurich, Switzerland, based accountant, Joseph Balmer.

This is done by non-Natives as a hobby and pastime, such as for a weekend retreat, hobbyist pow wow, or summer camp. It exists in several European countries, but is prominent in Germany, where approximately 40,000 practitioners, known as hobbyists, participate. Response to this by actual Native Americans has been largely negative.

==== Background ====
According to the history laid out in H. Glenn Penny's Kindred By Choice, many Germans identify their roots as tribes that lived independently of one another that were colonized by Romans and forced to become Christians. Because of this distant tribal background and history of colonization, and in fact all ancient Europeans lived tribally at some point in their history, many of these Germans identify with Native Americans more than European nations in contemporary times.

This belief in kindred lifestyle is detailed in Penny's in-depth study of German fascination with and performances as their ideas of historical Native American peoples. These Germans are also interested in depiction of Native Americans in art and anthropology. Penny covers this history in Kindred By Choice and other published writings, chronicling German artists such as Rudolf Cronau, Max Ernst, Georg Grosz, Otto Dix, and Rudolf Schlichter's portrayals of Native Americans.

German academics such as Alexander von Humboldt, Karl von den Steinen, Paul Ehrenreich, and Carl Jung all traveled to the United States to learn more about Native Americans. Their documentation of their journeys were regarded positively by the German public and assisted in fostering German fascination with Native Americans. Penny also details how Germans often denounced the violence inflicted upon Native peoples by the United States government.

Another factor in the popularity of Hobbyism in Germany can be attributed to the many Wild West shows that toured throughout Germany and featured real Native Americans in stereotypical "cowboy and Indian" performances. One of the most popular Wild West shows was organized by William Frederick "Buffalo Bill" Cody. German Hobbyism is generally believed to have been largely popularized by the dime-store novelist Karl May, whose fictional Apache warrior character, Winnetou, and his German blood-brother, Old Shatterhand, adventure throughout the Wild West. In one of the many novels, Winnetou is murdered and Old Shatterhand avenges him and ultimately becomes an Apache chief. The Winnetou novels were first published in the 1890s.

==== In the 20^{th} century ====
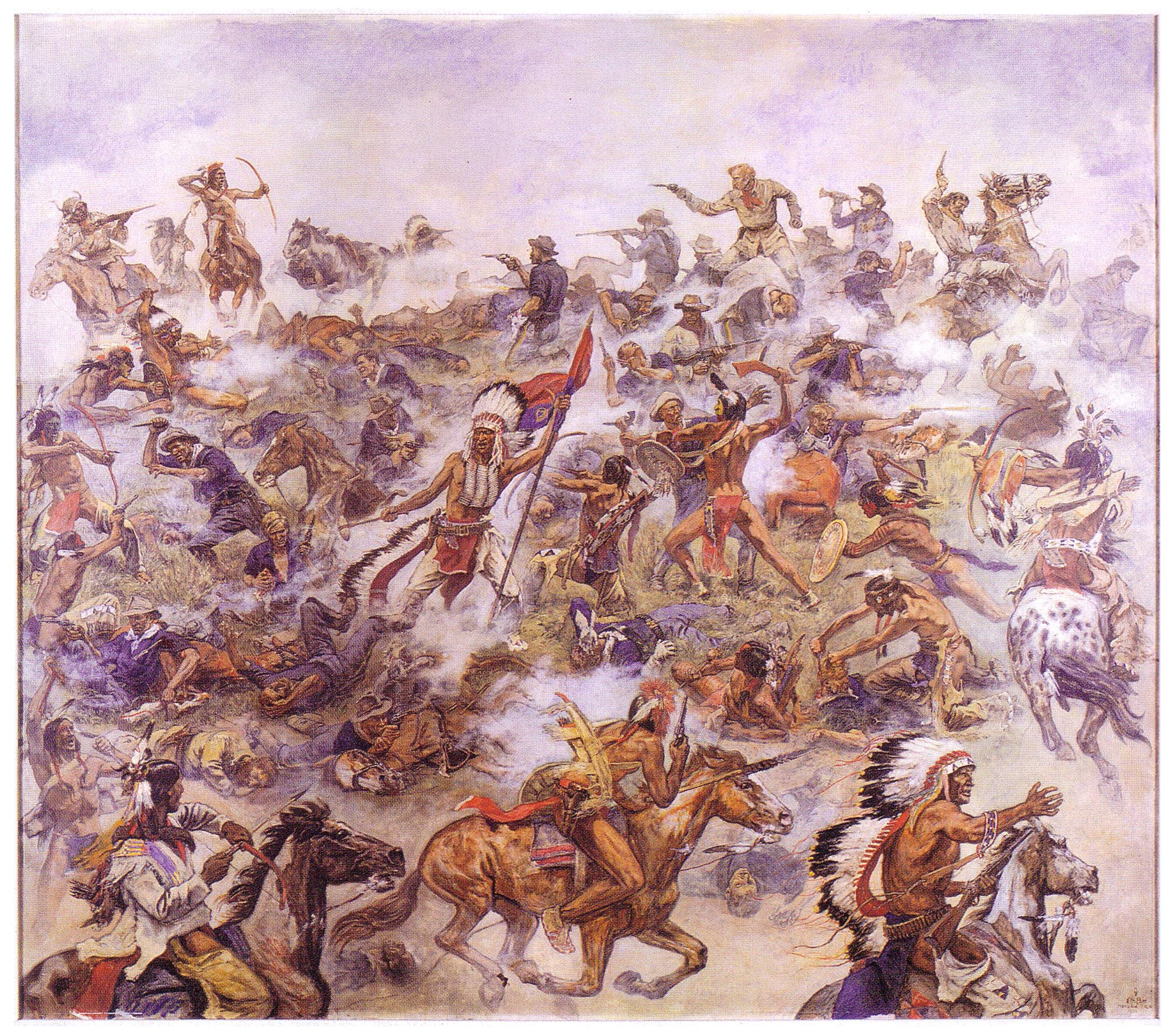
Die Indianerschlacht am Little Big Horn, by Elk Eber, 1936

The first such hobbyist club was the Cowboy Club founded in Munich in 1913. As part of the phenomenon of Indianertümelei a number of Western and Indian theme parks operate in Germany, the most popular of which are the Pullman City theme park outside of Munich and El Dorado theme park outside of Berlin.

Hobbyism was greatly affected by the separation of Germany after World War II. de:Katrin Sieg|'s Ethnic Drag discusses the differences between West German Hobbyism and East German Hobbyism, saying that while West Germany could continue to openly participate in the hobby, East Germans had to go underground for fear of being targeted as rebels. This translated to a difference in opinion between East and West in how they interacted with real Native Americans; East German hobbyist clubs often interacted with Native Americans and supported them in their issues financially.

West Germans often avoided contact with real Native Americans, which Sieg surmises is because they feared being told they are not truly Native American. These patterns continue to be true today. Dakota academic Philip Deloria theorizes in his book Playing Indian that there are two types of Hobbyism—people Hobbyism and item Hobbyism. West Germans would be considered, according to Deloria, as item hobbyists who focus on the objects, and the East Germans would be considered people hobbyists, who also include objects but want to interact with real Native Americans and issues facing Native communities.

The East German interest in having hobbyists start engaging with living Native Americans may be partially attributable to the fact that the East German government began to recognize the propaganda value; criticism of the historical treatment of American Indians could be used as an example of why East Germans citizens should criticize US policies in general.

May's novels featuring Winnetou and Old Shatterhand have been adapted into both theatrical and film productions in German-speaking countries. It is believed that film adaptations of Karl May's characters in the 1960s may have saved the West German film industry. Each summer in Bad Segeberg, Schleswig-Holstein, Germany, the Karl May Festival (Karl-May-Spiele) hosts stage productions weekly and particularly during the Karl May Festival. The Karl May Festival is an annual event purported to bring the Wild West to northern Germany.

==== In the 21^{st} century ====
German Hobbyism continues today in the form of festivals, museums, pow wows, theater, and clubs. The Karl May Festival in Bad Segeberg continues each year and is a popular attraction to families from all over Germany and Europe. Additionally, there are multiple Wild West Amusement Parks all throughout Germany. The Karl May Museum in Radebeul and other museums that host Native American exhibits continue to be wildly popular. Hobbyists that organize through the means of a club host pow wows and teach each other and communities about Native American culture. The topic of German Hobbyism has become more recently documented by mainstream news sources New York Times, the Huffington Post, and independent filmmakers such as Howie Summers, who created a short documentary titled Indianer that explores German Hobbyists and their fascinations.

Writer, psychologist and filmmaker Red Haircrow, whose father is African American while his mother is of Native (Chiricahua Apache/Cherokee) heritage, attended the Winter Pow-wow 2014 in Berlin on 15 February. He described the participants as wearing as many "breastplates, bear claw necklaces, feathers and bone jewelry as they seemed able to physically support," and that the attendees also wore Native American costumes in addition to the hobbyist dancers.

In 2019, it was estimated that between 40,000-100,000 Germans are involved in Indianer hobbyist clubs at any given moment. Interviewed in 2007, one member of an Indianer club stated: "Our camp is always in summer, in July for two weeks. During this time, we live in tipis, we wear only Indian clothes. We don't use technology and we try to follow Indian traditions. We have those [pretending to be] Lakota, Oglala, Blackfeet, Blood, Siksika, Pawneee... and we go on the warpath against each other day and night, anytime at all. In two weeks, every tribe can fight each other. We don't know when somebody will attack or when they will come to steal our horses. And the battles are always exciting, too. I really enjoy them".

==== Criticism ====
The main criticism of German Hobbyism by Native American journalists and academics argues on the basis of cultural appropriation and misrepresentation of Native American cultures and identities. When it comes to the borrowing of American Indian culture, Philip J. Deloria dubs it "playing Indian", which he defines as the adoption or portrayal of being Native by Anglo-American individuals. These actions are often motivated by hobby and sometimes financial gain. Further, Deloria writes that these individuals and groups who play Indian build a collectivity in their performance of otherness, which in turn defines their own identity through the distinction of playing the national "other".

Katrin Sieg applies the thoughts and ideas of Deloria to the performance studies field in Germany. Her book Ethnic Drag discusses the ways in which Germans have historically dressed up as "othered" peoples, which includes Jews, Native Americans and Turks. While the portrayals of Jews and Turks were largely negative stereotypes, the portrayal of Native Americans differed in that they were seen as heroic and noble.

The first Native American women's theater troupe known as Spiderwoman Theater traveled to Germany and Europe in order to perform a satire of the European and particularly German fascination with Native Americans. According to Spiderwoman Theater, it was an act of resistance meant to reclaim their identity as real Native Americans. Their show is titled Winnetou's Snake Oil Show from Wigwam City, and parodied Karl May's characters, New Ageism, and individuals who pretend to be Native American.

In 1982, a Canadian Ojibwe painter Ahmoo Allen Angeconeb visited West Germany where he discovered his paintings were selling better than in Canada, looking for a chance to exhibit his work. Angeconeb soon discovered that most Germans were interested in the traditional culture of the Plains Indian peoples and had no interest in the Eastern Woodslands peoples, such as the Ojibwe, or in the modern First Nations peoples. His attempts to argue that there was more to the Indians of North America than the lifestyle of the Plains Indians in the 18^{th} and 19^{th} centuries did not meet with much success, as he recalled in an interview: "Actually, most of these Indian clubs were interested in Plains Indians. So, when they found out I was Ojibwe, they had no idea who the Ojibwe were. We weren't Plains Indians, so therefore we weren't 'real Indians' [...]. [...] And then, they seem to have this romantic view that they didn't want to have altered. I was too 'real' an Indian for them. They wanted to keep their romantic view; they didn't want to hear about the modern way of living for Ojibwe people here. That we lived in wooden-structure homes, that we drove cars".

Red Haircrow has written articles from Berlin, where he resides, regarding the controversial aspects of Hobbyism from the perspective of a real Native American. Haircrow has traveled to pow wows and reported to Indian Country Today Media Network about his experience as a Native American at an event in which Germans performed Native American identity. He reported the premiere of the blockbuster remake The Lone Ranger, in which Hobbyists were hired to perform as Native Americans in Berlin.

Haircrow also covered a controversy at the Karl May Museum, when the owners of the museum in Radebeul refused to return Native American scalps to the tribes from which they are claimed to have come. As an act of protest, Native American singer Jana Mashonee chose not to perform at the Karl May Fest in Radebeul, Saxony and released an official statement denigrating the refusal of the Karl May Museum to return the Native American scalps. The scalps were not returned to the Ojibwe nation as requested, but they were removed from display.

Haircrow also notes that not every Native American has a negative view of the German fascination with their culture. Comanche Laura Kerchee, who was stationed in Germany with the U.S. Air Force, told him that "she was impressed with how enthralled the Germans there were by Native Americans". Haircrow adds that "some tribes in North America [are] reaching out to their fans in Europe. They realize that this is an opportunity to promote understanding and education and a way to market Native culture to a highly sympathetic audience." Red Haircrow's 2018 documentary "Forget Winnetou! Loving in the Wrong Way" focuses more Native perspectives on Indian hobbyism, cultural appropriation and the connection to racism and continuing colonial practices in Germany, won the Audience Award at the Refugees Welcome Film Festival in Berlin, Germany in 2018.

In the United States, there is a widespread criticism from Native Americans about the misappropriation and misrepresentation of Native American identity and culture. Examples include the Native American mascot controversy, backlash against artists such as Gwen Stefani and Lana Del Rey who have performed in feather war bonnets, and campaigns to educate the public about not wearing Native American costumes for Halloween and themed parties, such as My Culture Is Not a Costume. This same sentiment was expressed by Haircrow's son, who claimed that "they are stealing from others, but don't want to admit it. That's why they didn't want us there, because they know we know what they are doing is wrong".

In a New York Times short documentary titled Lost in Translation: Germany's Fascination with the American Old West, the actor portraying Winnetou, Jan Sosniok, is asked if he thinks that real Native Americans would take offense to the portrayal of Native Americans. The actor responds that he does not believe they would be offended. The video also portrays a German man who studied at the Institute of American Indian Arts in New Mexico. This person shares his discomfort with seeing a burial dance take place in the Bad Segeberg performance, and calls it grotesque and claims that it perpetuates a stereotypical image of the Native American.

Journalist James Hagengruber discussed German hobbyists in an article for Salon's website, describing the occasional clashes between the German fantasists and actual Native Americans. Visiting Native American dancers were shocked when German hobbyists protested their use of microphones and details of their costumes (to which they counter-protested). A hobbyist profiled in the article defended the German tendency to focus on Indian culture before 1880, instead of engaging with issues that affect contemporary tribes, comparing it to studying "the [ancient] Romans." Some Germans have been surprised and irritated when real Native Americans don't act the way they do in the German imagination.

Hagengruber comments that "some dying Indian languages may end up being preserved by German hobbyists." Dick Littlebear, "a member of the Northern Cheyenne Nation and the president of Chief Dull Knife College in Lame Deer, MT," told Hagengruber "he doesn't worry about Germans fixating on his culture," as long as they do not copy sacred ceremonies, and pointed out that he had learned "lost Northern Cheyenne stitching methods from the 1850s" from German hobbyists.

Journalist Noemi Lopinto in her article for UTNE reports that an Ojibwe man named David Redbird Baker found the performance of sacred ceremonies in Germany to be offensive: "They take the social and religious ceremonies and change them beyond recognition." Lopinto paraphrases Baker as adding, "They've held dances where anyone in modern dress is barred from attending—even visiting Natives." Both Lopinto and Hagengruber quote Carmen Kwasny, who works with the Native American Association of Germany, as saying the Germans need to learn to view Native Americans as people, rather than idealized cultural fantasy characters.

== Literature and art ==
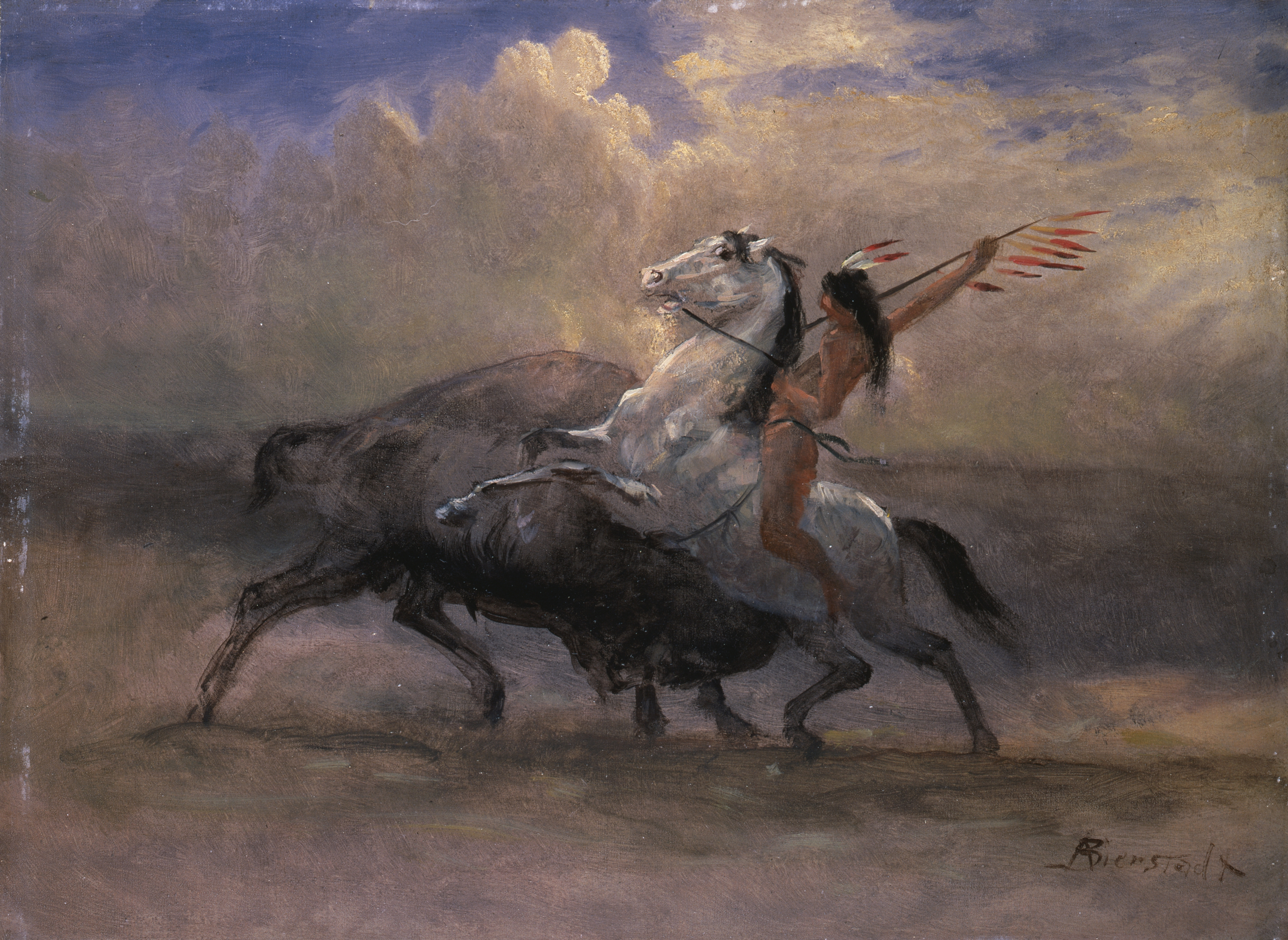
German-American painter Albert Bierstadt's Sketch for The Last of the Buffalo 1888

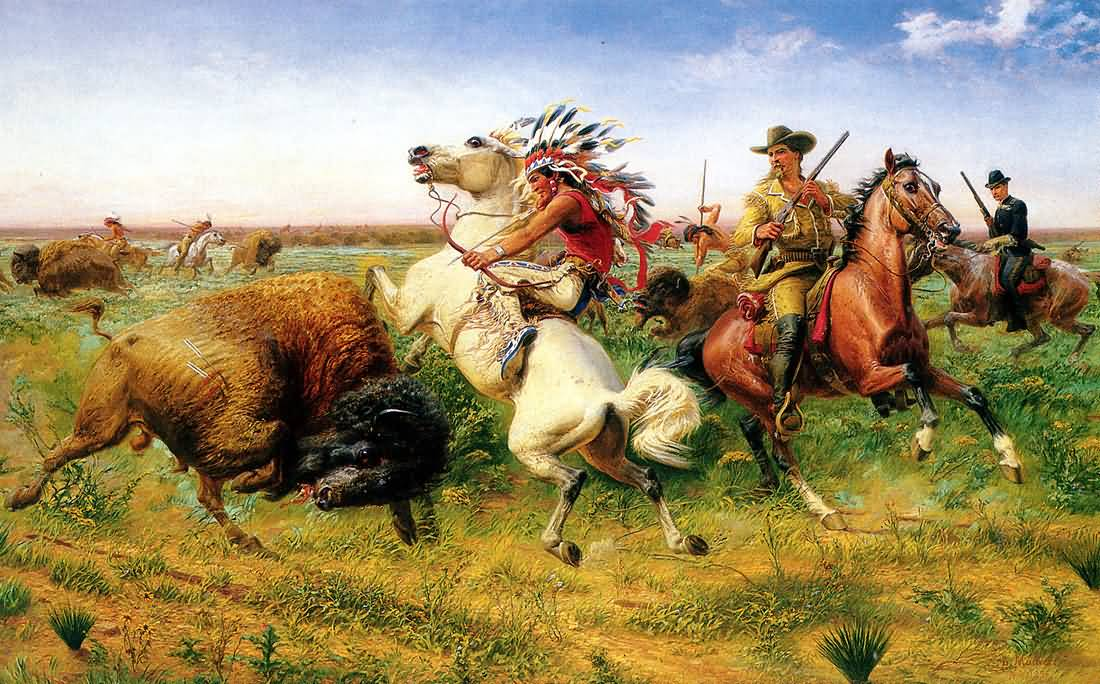
Louis Maurer, 1895: Great Royal Buffalo Hunt

The specific image of Indians originated earlier than May's writings. Already in the 18th century a specific German view on the fate of Native Americans can be found in various travel reports and scientific excursions.

Philipp Georg Friedrich von Reck (1710–1798) traveled to Massachusetts and Georgia in 1733/34 and saw the Muskogee nation. James Fenimore Cooper's Leatherstocking Tales were admired by Johann Wolfgang von Goethe and still are among the German youth literature classics. In 1815–18, the poet Adelbert von Chamisso took part in a tour around the world led by Otto von Kotzebue and met native people in Latin and Northern America.

Christian Gottlieb Prieber, a lawyer and political utopian from Zittau, emigrated to North America in 1735 and lived with the Cherokee in Tennessee. He tried to build a society based on his ideals but was imprisoned in 1743 and died in prison in 1745.

Maximilian zu Wied-Neuwied, a nobleman and scientist, traveled from 1815 to 1817 to Brazil and from 1832 to 1834 to North America, accompanied by the Swiss painter Karl Bodmer. Bodmer's portraits of North Dakota, Ohio River and Missouri River Indians includes, among others: Blackfoot, Choctaw, Cherokee and Chickasaw.

Karl Postl (1793–1864) wrote novels about his experiences in the US between 1823 and 1831, using the pseudonym Charles Sealsfield. Similarly to Friedrich Gerstäcker, he wrote about Tecumseh and provided a more realistic picture than previous authors.

Fritz Steuben's Tecumseh novels were bestsellers in the 1930s. After some Nazi allegations had been erased, the novels were reprinted – and sold well again – in the 1950s.

Painter and ice skater Julius Seyler (1873–1955) lived in Montana and depicted Blackfeet (Three Bear, Eagle Calf, Bear Pipe Man, etc.) and sacred locations such as the Chief Mountain. Early modern painters inspired by Native Americans include August Macke, George Grosz, Max Slevogt and Rudolf Schlichter.

Klaus Dill (1922–2000) was a well known illustrator of German books about Native Americans.

Bavarian musician Willy Michl describes himself as an "Isar Indian".

Pop rock band Nena's first album, Nena (1983), includes a song about "Indians like you and me" (German: Indianer wie du und ich).

German musician Olaf Henning made a hit song called "Cowboy und Indianer" that was quite successful, reaching 6th position on the German charts in February 2009.

The Vanilla Ninja cover of "When the Indians Cry", originally by Chris Norman, became a major hit in Austria in 2004, reaching 7th in the charts.

Franz Kafka's short short story (just one lengthy sentence) "Wish to become an Indian" ("Wunsch, Indianer zu werden") was published in 1912:

If one were only an Indian, instantly alert, and on a racing horse, leaning against the wind, kept on quivering jerkily over the quivering ground, until one shed one's spurs, for there needed no spurs, threw away the reins, for there needed no reins, and hardly saw that the land before one was smoothly shorn heath when horse's neck and head would be already gone.

— Franz Kafka

== German Westerns ==
=== East German Westerns ===
The GDR produced Indianerfilme (Indian Films) under the production company DEFA. These films were massively popular and heavily inspired by West German interpretations of Karl May novels and spaghetti westerns. Under DEFA, the western genre was entirely different with the protagonists being Native Americans, their chief usually being played by actor Gojko Mitic, and the antagonists being white settlers and the US military. Indianerfilme are mostly concerned with presenting an anti-imperialist and anti-capitalist message. These films were massively successful in East German box offices, with more than 9 million tickets sold for the most popular Indianerfilm: "Die Söhne der großen Bärin" (The Sons of Great Bear).

List of GDR Westerns:

- "Die Söhne der großen Bärin" (1966)
- "Chingachgook, die große Schlange" (1967)
- "Spur des Falken" (1968)
- "Weiße Wölfe" (1969)
- "Tödlicher Irrtum" (1969)
- "Osceola" (1971)
- "Tecumseh" (1972)
- "Apachen" (1973)
- "Blutsbrüder" (1975)

== Common German proverbs referring to "Indianer" ==
In a 1999 speech delivered in the United States in English, Lutz declared: "For over two hundred years, Germans have found Indianer so fascinating that even today an Indian iconography is used in advertising. The most popular image of the Indianer is provided by Karl May's fictional Apache chief Winnetou... Indian lore is profitable and marketable, as some Native Americans travelling in Germany may attest... There is a marked Indian presence in German everyday culture, even down to the linguistic level, where sentences like ein Indianer weint nicht (an Indian doesn't cry), ein Indianer kennt keinen Schmerz (an Indian braves pain) or figures such as der letzte Mohikaner (the Last of the Mohicans) have become part of the everyday speech". Other examples include:

"Großes Indianerehrenwort!", literal translation "Indian's major word of honour!", synonymous with "Scout's honour!".

"Ein Indianer kennt keinen Schmerz!", literal translation "An Indian knows no pain!", synonymous with "Big boys don't cry!".

“I had thought,” resumed Cora, “that an Indian warrior was patient, and that his spirit felt not and knew not the pain his body suffered?” - The Last of the Mohicans (1826), Volume 1, Chapter 11.

== German-American heritage ==
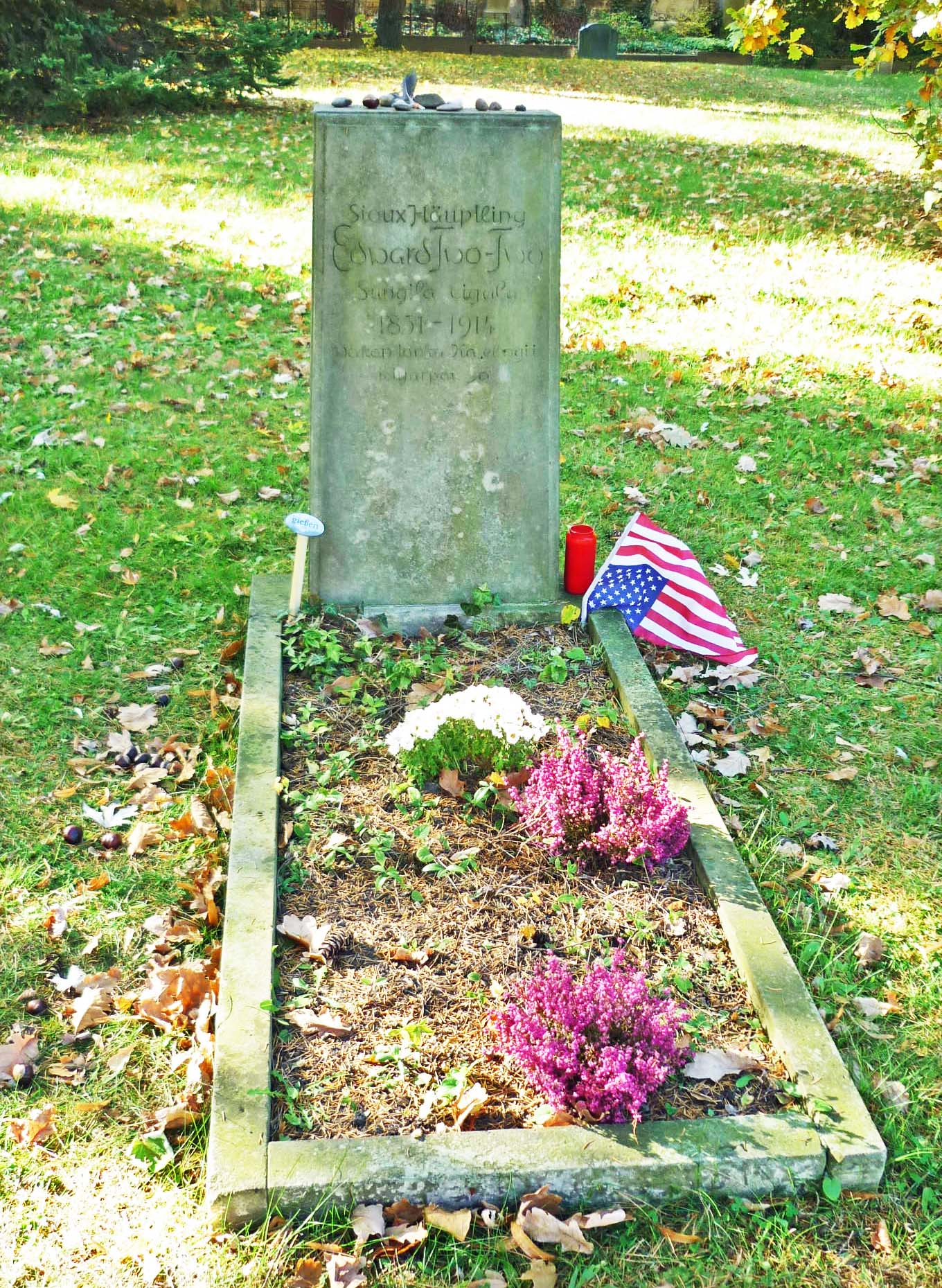
The grave of Edward Two-Two in Dresden

The descendants of the founders of New Braunfels and Fredericksburg in Texas claim that their peace treaty with the local natives, the Meusebach–Comanche Treaty of 1847, has never been broken. However, German immigrants underwent less of a close synthesis and interaction than, for example, Scottish Americans, with some notable exceptions such as Ben Reifel.

Prominent German-Americans with a certain role in the image-building of Native Americans include the painters Albert Bierstadt (1830–1902) and Louis Maurer (1832–1932). Important contribution in the humanities include anthropologist Franz Boas (1858–1942) and Native American Renaissance writer Louise Erdrich (born 1954).

Germans still have an easygoing approach to using blackface or redface; there is a varied and continuing tradition of temporarily immersing oneself in different customs that is part of Carnival. Indianerhobby reenactment or living history is in effect part of German folklore. The "cult" goes beyond Karl May and aims at a high level of authenticity. This sort of "second-hand folklore" is an alternative way of dealing with Americanization, "anti-Imperialism", and popular ethnology.

The background in human zoos (Völkerschau in German) and the first Western movies is still vivid as well in "Cowboy and Indianer" children games. Americans have e.g. harshly criticized photoshoot of (predominantly white) candidates dressed in Native American garb in Heidi Klum's Germany's Next Topmodel show.

The harsh condemnation by Marta Carlson, a Native American activist, of Germans for getting pleasure from "something their whiteness has participated in destroying", is not shared by others. As with Irish or Scottish immigrants, the "whiteness" of German immigrants was not a given for WASP Americans. Both Germans and Native Americans had to regain some of their customs, as a direct heritage tradition was no longer in place. It is however still somewhat disturbing for both sides when German hobby Indians meet Native German enthusiasts. There are allegations of plastic shamanism versus mockery about Native Americans excluding non-Indians and banning alcohol at their events. German (and Czechs) hobbyists' concept of multiculturalism includes the inaleniable right to keep and drink beer in their tipis or kohtes.

== Notable collections and museums ==
The Indian department of the Ethnological Museum of Berlin contains one of the largest collections of Native American artifacts in the world, the curators ask for a more active community dealing with the heritage.

Maximilian zu Wied-Neuwied, sketches and paintings are part of Prince Maximilian's travel report book Reise im Inneren von Nordamerika (1844) and can be seen at the Nordamerika Native Museum (NONAM) in Zurich and in the Joslyn Art Museum in Omaha, Nebraska.

Villa Shatterhand in Radebeul, Saxony, hosts the Karl-May-Museum and in its backyard, a log cabin called Villa Bärenfett (bear fat villa) with an exhibition about Red Indians. Author, adventurer, artist, curator and acrobat Ernst Tobis alias Patty Frank (1876–1959) founded this leading collection of Native American artifacts in Germany and took care of them till his death. He led hundreds of thousands of visitors through the collection.

The Museum Five Continents in Munich contains the collection of Indian artefacts and art of Princess Theresa of Bavaria, a natural scientist and eager traveler.

The Übersee Museum Bremen possesses a permanent exhibition on the Americas with many North American Native pieces and examples. The museum even includes a buffalo taxidermy.

The Linden Museum in Stuttgart has a permanent exhibit of items from plains and prairie cultures present in their America Room.

== See also ==
- List of fictional Native Americans
- Cosplay
- Declaration on the Rights of Indigenous Peoples
- Indian princess
- Native American criticism of the New Age movement
- Ostern, the Soviet Union and Eastern Bloc countries' take on the Western.
- Pretendian
- Rainbow Gathering
