= Cronau =

Cronau is a surname. Notable people with the surname include:

- Rudolf Cronau (1855–1939), German-American painter, illustrator, and journalist
- Shelley Cronau (born 1985), Australian wheelchair basketball player
