= Edward Two-Two =

Edward Two Two
- Edward Two-Two
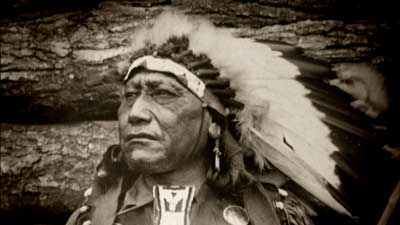
- Edward Two-Two

Lakota leader

Personal details
- Born: c.1851 Great Plains, United States. Near present day North and South Dakota
- Died: July 27, 1914 Essen, German Empire
- Resting place: New Catholic Cemetery; Dresden, Germany
- Known for: Native American actor who demonstrated his culture to German citizens.

Edward Two-Two (c.1851 in the USA; died July 27, 1914, Essen, Germany) was a Lakota Sioux Native American who appeared at the beginning of the 20th century at Hagenbeck in Hamburg, Germany, and in the Sarrasani circus in Dresden educating and entertaining German audiences of Native American life.

== Early life ==
Edward Two-Two was a Native American from the Lakota Sioux tribe, who was born on the Great Prairie of the United States, which later became the Pine Ridge Reservation in South Dakota. He later served as a Reserve Police Officer on that reservation in 1891. He traveled to Germany in 1910 to be part of a human zoo, in the Hagenbeck Zoo of Hamburg, Germany and shortly afterward he returned to America. Sometime between 1913 and 1914, he returned with his family again to Europe, and worked at the Sarrasani circus in Dresden where he was appointed "Sioux Chief".

Due to the good treatment and recognition of his family, he expressed his wish to be buried in Dresden. While touring in Essen he died, his body was transferred as back to Dresden and was buried at the New Catholic Cemetery. His name "Two-Two" meant in the Lakota language means "One of two". The inscription on his gravestone reads in the Lakota language: "To Paradise angel like you escort".

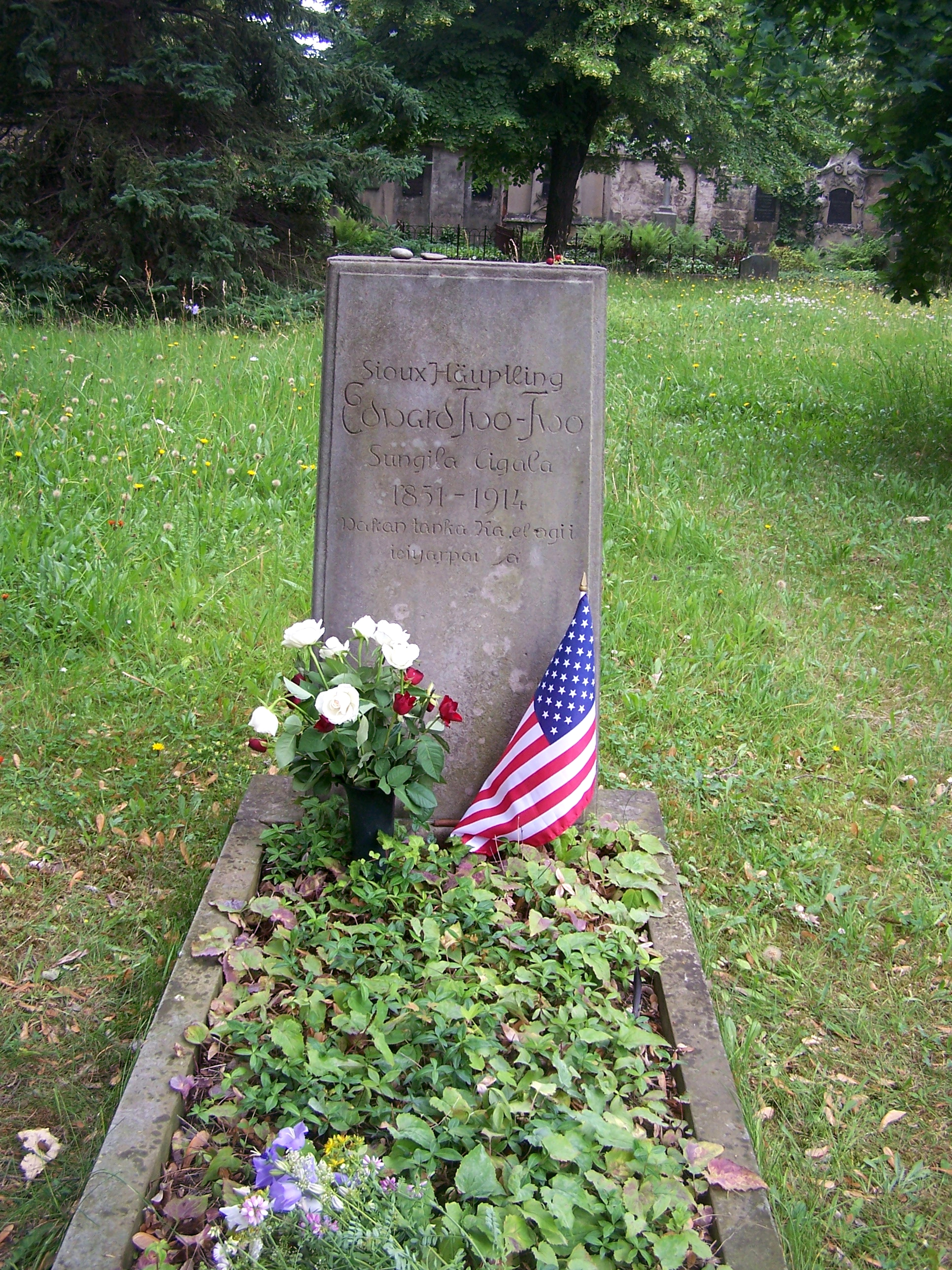
Gravesite of Edward Two Two

== Other individuals ==
Two-Two and German writer Karl May, who wrote extensively about Native American culture and contributed to the popular image of Native Americans in German-speaking countries, never met as Karl May died in 1912, before Two-Two and his men arrived in Dresden in March 1913. In addition to the grave at the New Catholic Cemetery in Dresden, there is a second Indian grave in Emden (William Big Charger, 1872-1932), where another Sarrasani Indian died there in 1932. In 2012 Bettina Renner produced a documentary Bury My Heart in Dresden, which deals with the contemporary life of the Indians on the Pine Ridge Reservation in South Dakota, with Edward Two-Two and his descendants.

== External sources ==
- Anne Drees Bach: Domesticated Wild. The exhibition "exotic" people in Germany, Campus Verlag, 2005.
- René Grießbach: Indians in Dresden, in:. Blätt'l Dresden, 18. Jg, issue 13/2007 of November 2, 2007
