= Fritz Steuben =

German author

- Born: Erhard Wittek; 3 December 1898
- Died: 4 June 1981 (aged 82)
- Occupation: Author

Fritz Steuben (3 December 1898 – 4 June 1981), the pen name of Erhard Wittek, was a German author who wrote popular novels and stories about romanticised Native Americans. His bestselling novels depicting the life of the Shawnee chief Tecumseh were influenced by national socialism.

He wrote several war novels based on personal experiences in World War I, including "Durchbruch anno achtzehn: Ein Fronterlebnis" ("Breakthrough 1918: A Frontline Experience") and other novels under his birth name.

== Early life and military service ==
Wittek was born in Wongrowitz, Province of Posen. He participated in World War I.

== Career ==
After the war he started as a book-seller apprentice and became finally head of production in the publishing house Franckh-Kosmos in Stuttgart.

From 1929 until 1952 Steuben wrote stories on American Indians under his pseudonym. The eight volumes of his Tecumseh anthology follow the Shawnee chief Tecumseh from his childhood to his death. In 1937 Wittek moved to Neustrelitz, where he lived as an independent writer. In 1955 he moved again to Pinneberg, where he died.

Using the pen name Fritz Steuben, initially for his Native American Indian (Tecumseh) stories, he wrote many of his works under the influence of national socialism. However, contrary to the Western novels of Karl May, famous in Germany, yet temporarily discredited by false claims to authenticity, his fiction was based on real persons and comparatively serious use of sources available to him. In Germany his books had already achieved a circulation of 790,000 copies in the Thirties. After the Second World War the Tecumseh-anthology reappeared ideologically cleaned (or at least superficially politically corrected) by Nina Schindler and is still on sale in this form.

== Selected works ==
=== Erhard Wittek ===
- Das Buch als Werbemittel, 1926
- Durchbruch anno achtzehn. Ein Fronterlebnis, Stuttgart 1933
- Männer. Ein Buch des Stolzes, 1936 (Männer, heroische Anekdoten aus dem Krieg, 1944)
- Bewährung der Herzen, Novelle, Dresden 1937
- Traum im Februar, Erzählung, 1939
- Ein Becher Wasser, und andere Begebenheiten aus Polen, Dresden 1940
- Der Marsch nach Lowitsch. Ein Bericht, 1940
- Dem Vaterland zugute ..., Erzählung, Dresden 1943
- Wir, von der Weichsel und Warthe edited with Karlheinz Gehrmann, Hanns von Krannhals, Salzburg 1950
- Der alte Witt und andere Geschichten aus dem Osten, Würzburg 1963

=== Pseudonym Fritz Steuben ===
- Tecumseh-Reihe, Franckh'sche Verlagshandlung, Stuttgart 1930–1939
  - 0. Schneller Fuß und Pfeilmädchen 1935
  - 1. Der fliegende Pfeil, 1930, Tecumseh – The Flying Arrow
  - 2. Der rote Sturm, 1931
  - 3. Tecumseh, der Berglöwe, 1932
  - 4. Der strahlende Stern, 1934
  - 5. Tecumseh, der große Seher
  - 6. Der Sohn des Manitu, 1938
  - 7. Tecumseh, der große Häuptling, (T.-Häuptling der Indianer. =Tecumseh, Strahlender Stern + Großer Häuptling Tecumseh).
  - 8. Tecumsehs Tod 1939, Tecumseh's Death (part 1 of this separated as Ruf der Wälder, 1951)
- Die Karawane am Persergolf. Eine abenteuerliche Kriegsfahrt durch die arabische Wüste, 1935
- Der ehrliche Zöllner. Kleine Geschichten aus dem Osten, 1949
- Wolfram fährt nach Südtirol. Die Geschichte einer Kinderfreundschaft, 1949
- Bewährung der Herzen, 1949
- Emir Dynamit. Bilder aus dem Leben des Obersten Lawrence, 1949
- Die Anna, Roman, Stuttgart 1951
- Dort hinter dem gläsernen Berge, 1952
- Zwei Mädel wie Hund und Katze. Ein fröhliches Buch aus glücklichen Tagen (Illustrationen von Ulrik Schramm), 1954
- Müllers ziehen um. Zwei Mädel wie Hund und Katze in der neuen Heimat (Illustrationen von Ulrik Schramm), 1955
- Mississippi Saga, Sieur de la Salle, Entdecker, Eroberer, Edelmann, 1956. (Tragödie am Mississippi, 1957)
- Gunnar vom Eisland, 1957
- Der Weg nach Bethlehem. Zeichn. v. Willy Kretzer, Wien 1957
- Der ewige Hunger nach Gold. Interessantes, Amüsantes und Verwunderliches aus der Geschichte des Handels, Gütersloh 1965
- Abenteuer, Abenteuer!, (Editor) 1957
- Gunnar vom Eisland. Illustr. v. Heiner Rothfuchs, 1957
- Der weite Ritt, Roman, Gütersloh 1960
- Die reinsten Musterkinder (Illustrationen von Heiner Rothfuchs), 1968
- Auf großer Fahrt. Wanderungen zwischen Pregel und Beskiden, Freiburg 1966
- Der Thronfolger. Fürstensohn Ibn Saud gründet das heutige Königreich Saudi-Arabien, 1976

Steuben edited also renarrated editions of James Fenimore Cooper. Cooper was together with Kipling his preferred model author.

=== Translations ===
- Roland Dorgelès: Die hölzernen Kreuze (jointly with Tony Kellen)
- Richard Morenus: Alaska Slim. Ein Leben in der Wildnis, 1956
- Glenn Tucker: Tecumseh, Bremen 1969 (Tecumseh, Vision of Glory)

== Literature ==
Secondary literature concentrates mostly on the ideological function and the corresponding developments after the war.

- Barbara Haible: Indianer im Dienste der NS-Ideologie. Untersuchungen zur Funktion von Jugendbüchern über nordamerikanische Indianer im Nationalsozialismus. Hamburg: Kovac 1998. (= Schriftenreihe Poetica; 32) ISBN 3-86064-751-2 ( an analysis of youth fiction on (Native American) Indians in the Service of NS-ideology)
- Winfred Kaminski: Heroische Innerlichkeit. Studien zur Jugendliteratur vor und nach 1945. Frankfurt am Main: dipa-Verlag 1987. (= Jugend und Medien; 14) ISBN 3-7638-0127-8
- Thomas Kramer: "Tecumseh und Toka-itho: Edle Wilde unter roten Brüdern. Zur Rezeption der Indianerbücher von Fritz Steuben und Liselotte Welskopf-Henrich in der DDR". In: Berliner Blätter. Ethnographische und Ethnologische Beiträge (noch im Druck)
- Günter Waldmann: Die Ideologie der Erzählform. Mit einer Modellanalyse von NS-Literatur. München: Fink 1976. (= Uni-Taschenbücher; 525) ISBN 3-7705-1332-0
