= Joseph Balmer =

Swiss historian (1914–2006)

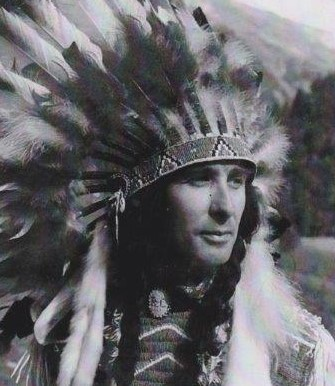
- Joseph Balmer in 1962
- Born: 26 December 1914; Ebikon, Switzerland
- Died: 4 June 2006 (aged 91); Küsnacht, Switzerland
- Occupation: historian
- Spouse: Hedwig Huber
- Children: Josef James Balmer; Susanna Hedwig Maria Balmer
- Writing career
- Genres: Native Americans, Plains Indians, Western Americana

Joseph Balmer (26 December 1914 – 4 June 2006) was a Swiss specialist in Native American studies.

== Early life ==
Balmer was born in Ebikon, Lucerne to Peter Balmer of Flühli, Lucerne and Josephine Magdalena, née Schwerzmann. In 1920, his family moved to Horw, Lucerne where Balmer attended elementary school for six years, following his secondary schooling (Swiss equivalent of the American high school) in the city of Lucerne. In 1929 his family moved again, to Zürich, Switzerland's largest city where his father found employment in an import/export firm primarily dealing with oriental carpets. Balmer would briefly find part-time work at the same firm where his father worked. In 1930, at the age of 16, Balmer entered a mercantile apprenticeship with the COOP Konkordia Schweiz and underwent 3 years' training as an accountant, graduating in 1933. However, he spent most of his spare time reading about North America's Native Americans

== Career ==
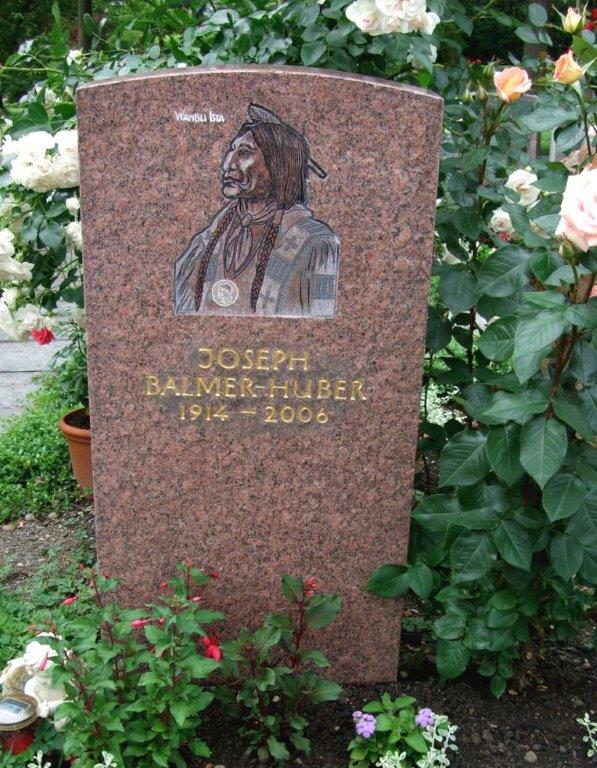
Balmer's gravestone in Zürich

Starting in the 1920s Balmer would spend much of his time at local libraries in Zürich, reading literature pertaining to Native Americans and the American frontier. He was particularly inspired by the book "Der Letzte Mandanen-Häuptling" (The Last Chief of the Mandans) by Wilhelm Herchenbach, inspiring his lifelong interest in the subject. Balmer, by now proficient in English, began corresponding with notable historians and authors of Native Americana in this period, including Stanley Vestal, George E. Hyde, Earl Alonzo Brininstool, and Mari Sandoz, and became well known in Europe as an authority on the subject. He also taught himself the Lakota language. Balmer, at the suggestion of the Bureau of Indian Affairs, also reached out to various Indian reservations in South Dakota by mail, befriending a number of the few surviving veterans of the Indian Wars. Some of the descendants of Chief Red Cloud at Pine Ridge Indian Reservation adopted Balmer into the family, bestowing upon him the Lakota name Wambli Ista [Eagle Eye], a fact into which he took great pride. Over the years Balmer acquired hundreds of first edition books on Native American subjects, many of which were inscribed personally to him. He also owned an sizable collection of Native American artifacts, among of which was a pair of moccasins once owned by James Henry Red Cloud (1879-1960), grandson of the great chief Red Cloud, and a warbonnet trailer decorated with eagle feathers that had belonged to Jackson "Jack" Red Cloud (ca. 1858–1918), the former's son. Balmer also assembled a large collection of period photographs by photographers such as David Francis Barry, Orlando Scott Goff, John C. H. Grabill, Stanley J. Morrow, Frank Bennett Fiske, George W. Scott, Laton Alton Huffman, George E. Trager & Frederick Kuhn and others. By the 1950s Balmer's reputation as a Native American expert had become well known in Europe, even though he never set foot onto the American continent or ever personally encountered a Native American. He was frequently consulted by European scholars and authors throughout the remainder of his life, including Swiss author de:Ernie Hearting. Balmer died on 4 June 2006 in Küsnacht.

== Personal life ==
Balmer was married in Zürich on 21 May 1937, to Hedwig Huber [1915-2011]. The union produced two children, Josef James and Susanna Hedwig Maria Balmer.
