= Rudolf Cronau =

German-American artist and journalist

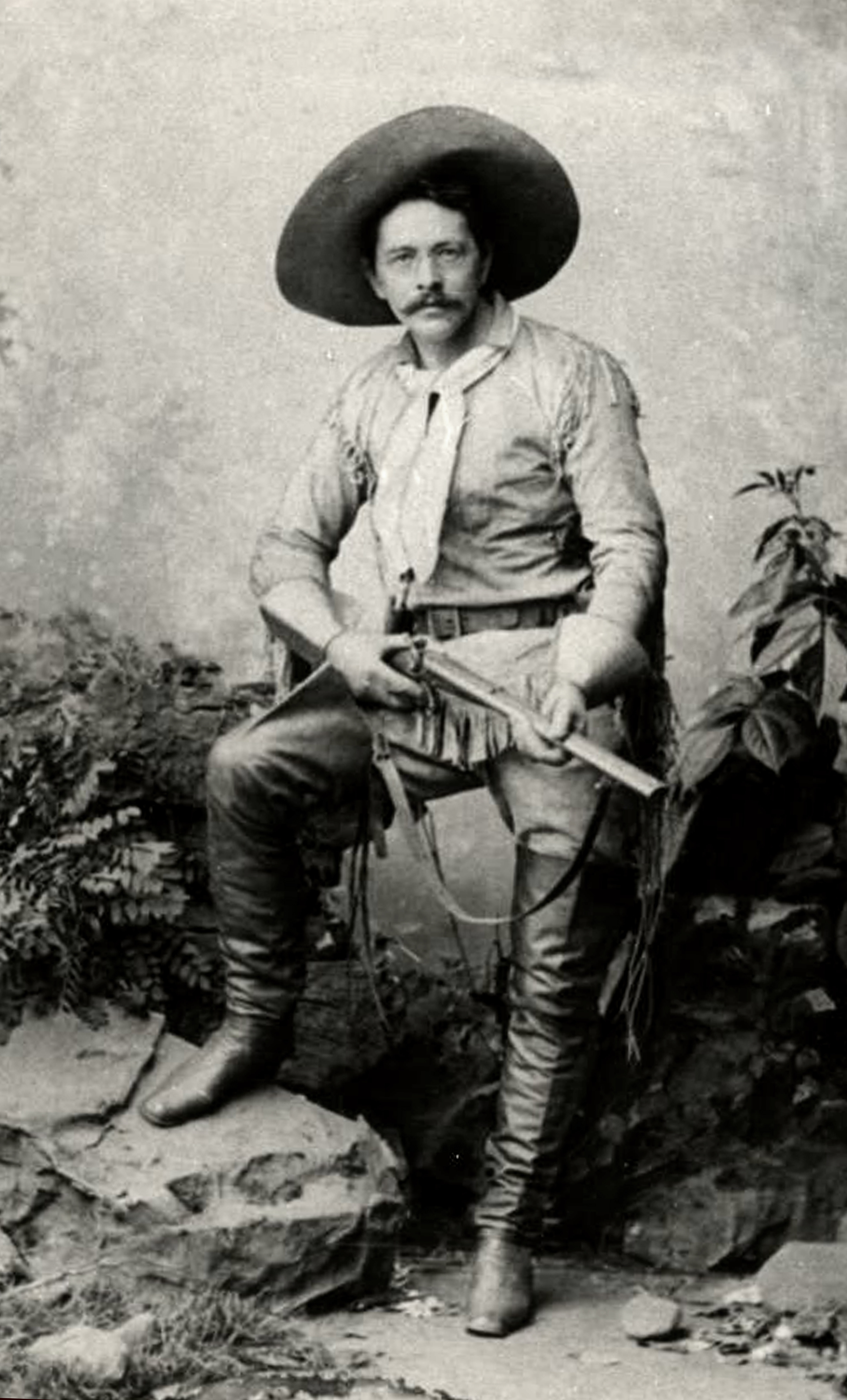
- Rudolf Cronau, 1882/83
- Born: Rudolf Daniel Ludwig Cronau; 21 January 1855; Solingen, Prussia (Nordrhein-Westfalen), Germany
- Died: 27 October 1939 (aged 84); Philipse Manor, New York, United States
- Occupations: illustrator, journalist, author
- Spouse: Margarethe Tänzler (1865-1944)
- Children: 3
- Writing career
- Notable works: portrait of Sitting Bull; Von Wunderland zu Wunderland (1886); Im Wilden Westen (1890)

Signature
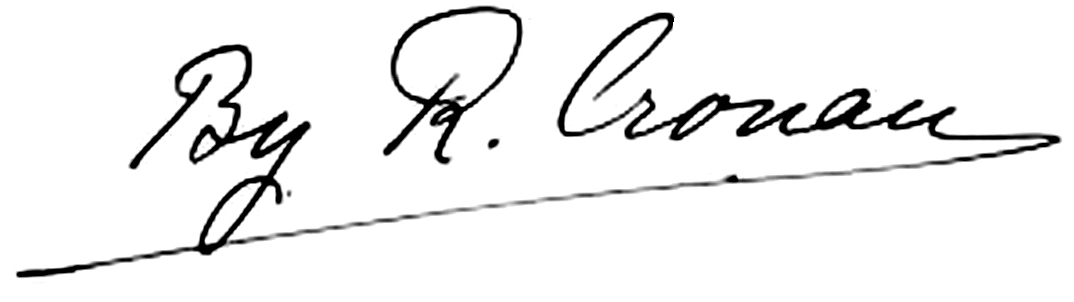

Rudolf Daniel Ludwig Cronau (21 January 1855 – 27 October 1939) was a German-American painter, illustrator and journalist.

Rudolf Cronau was well known in Germany for his illustrations, articles and books about the American West.

== Early life ==
Rudolf Daniel Ludwig Cronau was born in Solingen, North Rhine-Westphalia, Prussia (Germany) on 21 January 1855, the only son of Rudolf Cronau, tax official by Helene Wilhelmine, née Waldeck. He attended between 1866 and 1869 the public school (höhere Bürgerschule) at Solingen. In 1870 Cronau was accepted into the Royal Academy of Art in Düsseldorf receiving formal art training, among others from renowned Andreas Achenbach. For a time he maintained an art studio at Düsseldorf. In 1877 he relocated to Leipzig and began working for Die Gartenlaube, an illustrated magazine. Cronau landed the job as their correspondent to the United States and sailed on the vessel "Oder" from Bremen, Germany reaching New York City on 17 January 1881.

== Career ==
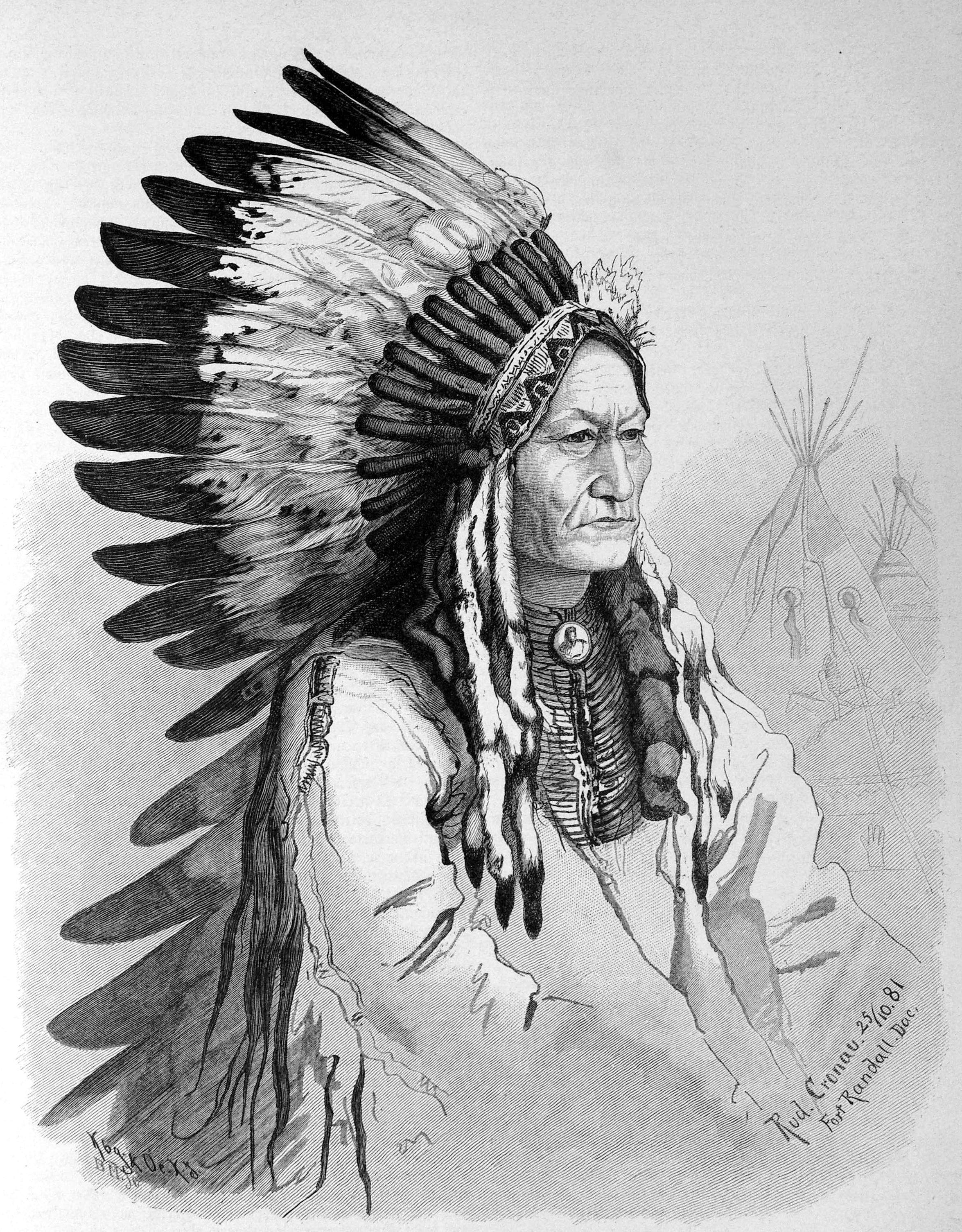
Die Gartenlaube (1882) b 277

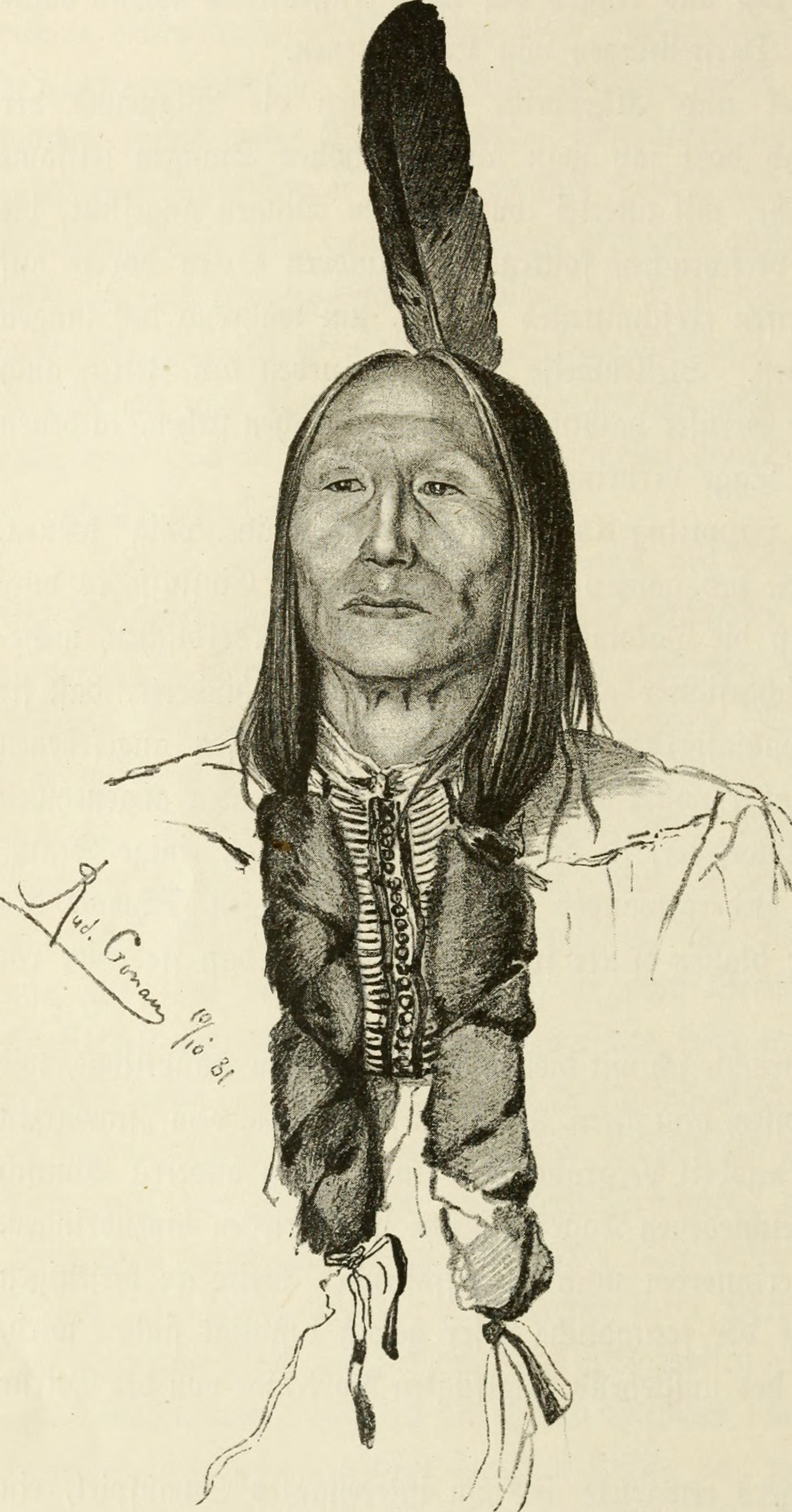
Im wilden Westen - eine Künstlerfahrt durch die Prairien und Felsengebirge der Union (1890) (14785919953)

Cronau contributed a series of articles and illustrations on the subject of life in the United States. In the fall of 1881 he journeyed to Fort Randall in Dakota Territory where he would meet and befriend Sitting Bull, then a prisoner of war at that post. Cronau was sympathetic to the Indian's plight, causing him to remain nearly half a year in the territory documenting and illustrating the Sioux. Most of Rudolf Cronau's artistic work from that period is in pencil, some in pen, and there are a few watercolors. Some of his drawings were transferred into collotypes, a photo printing process using gelatin. After Cronau returned to Germany in 1883, he published 50 collotypes in a book about his American visit entitled "Von Wunderland zu Wunderland".

== Criticism ==
In Cronau's earlier writings in the 1880s and those just following the Plains Wars, he described an affinity with Indigenous people – the Sioux in particular. However, during WWI his opinions of Indigenous peoples changed dramatically casting Indigenous peoples as a "hindrance of progress and territorial expansion." The historian H. Glenn Penny describes this type of German settler colonialism in Minnesota, in his book Kindred by Choice: Germans and American Indians since 1800. The historian Christoph Strobel goes on to point out that Cronau was exemplary of "the rise and fall of German America, the transnational world and interactions of Native American performers and artists, post–World War II Native American and German activists, reservation tourism, German hobbyists “playing” Indians."

Cronau was aligned with the beliefs of Social Darwinism; he "argued that the key to progress was the annihilation of the "lower races," who stood in the way of advanced culture and civilization." Some social Darwinists of his time believed that violent racial extermination "would result in moral progress for humanity."

== Family and later life ==
Rudolf Cronau was married in Leipzig, Germany on 8 February 1888 to Margarethe Tänzler of Chemnitz. Their daughter Margarethe Hildegard was born at Leipzig on 8 February 1892. Two years later, in 1894 Cronau returned to the United States bringing his wife and daughter settling in Washington DC, where their second daughter, Elisabeth was born on 20 January 1896. By the turn of the century Cronau relocated to New York where he would reside the remainder of his life. His only son, Rudolph was born in New York on 6 March 1900. Rudolf Cronau became a naturalized U.S. citizen on 21 December 1901. He died in Philipse Manor, New York, on 27 October 1939.

== Publications (all in German) ==
- Die Geschichte der Solinger Klingenindustrie (1885)
- Fahrten im Lande der Sioux (1886)
- Von Wunderland zu Wunderland (1886/87)
- Das Buch der Reklame. Geschichte, Wesen und Praxis der Reklame (1887–1889)
- Im Wilden Westen (1890)
- Amerika: Die Geschichte seiner Entdeckung (1892)
- Drei Jahrhunderte deutschen Lebens in Amerika (1909)
- Die Deutschen als Gründer von Neu-Amsterdam/New York und als Urheber und Träger der amerikanischen Freiheitsbestrebungen (1926)

== Publications in English ==
- Illustrative Cloud Forms for the Guidance of Observers in the Classification of Clouds (1897)
- Our Wasteful Nation. The Story of American Prodigality and the Abuse of Our National Resources (1908)
- Do We Need a Third War of Independence (1914)
- The British Black Book (1915)
- England, a Destroyer of Nations (1915)
- Our Hyphenated Citizens: Are They Right or Wrong? (1916)
- Woman Triumphant. The Story of Her Struggles for Freedom, Education, and Political Rights (1919)
- The Army of the American Revolution and its Organizer (1923)
- Prohibition and the Destruction of the American Brewing Industry (1926)

== See also ==
- Native Americans in German popular culture
- Noble savage
