= Military history of Native Americans =

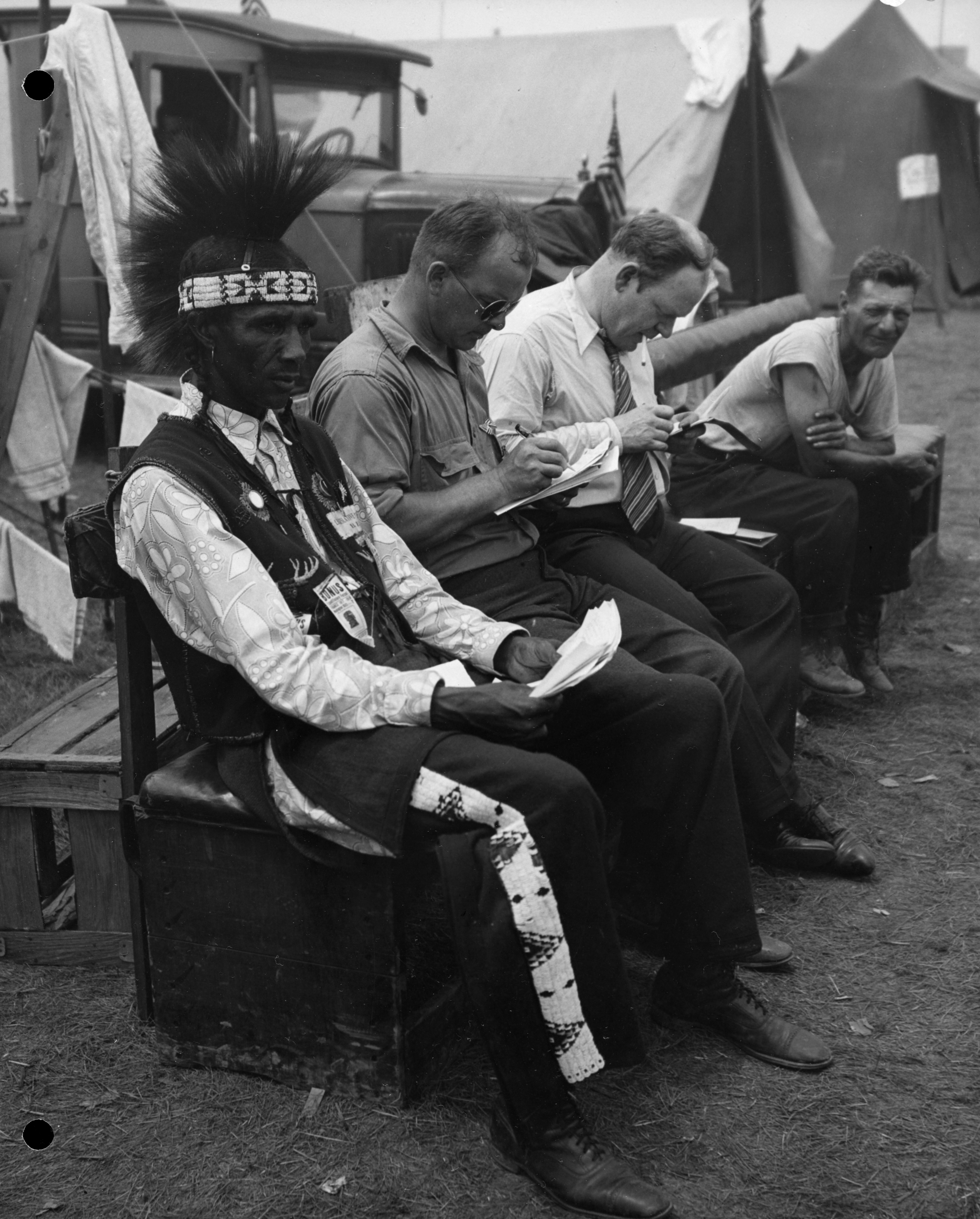
A Native American veteran at the Bonus Army camp in Washington, D.C. c. July 1932

Native Americans in the United States have been a part of major military engagements throughout the history of the United States. There were many wars and battles fought between tribes before the birth of the United States, and later between European colonizers and Native Americans. Native Americans participated in many of the wars of the United States such as the French and Indian War, the Revolutionary War, the War of 1812, the Civil War, the Spanish–American War, the Philippine–American War, the Boxer Rebellion, World War I, World War II, the Korean War, the Vietnam War, the Gulf War, the War in Afghanistan, and the Iraq War.

== Terminology ==
Over time, different names have been used to refer to the Indigenous people of North America, such as Indian, Indigenous, Native American, Native, etc. The specific names of tribes or groups, such as Cherokee, Navajo, or Shawnee, are preferable. For the sake of clarity in this article, the name Native or Native American will be used, unless from a direct quote.

== French and Indian War ==
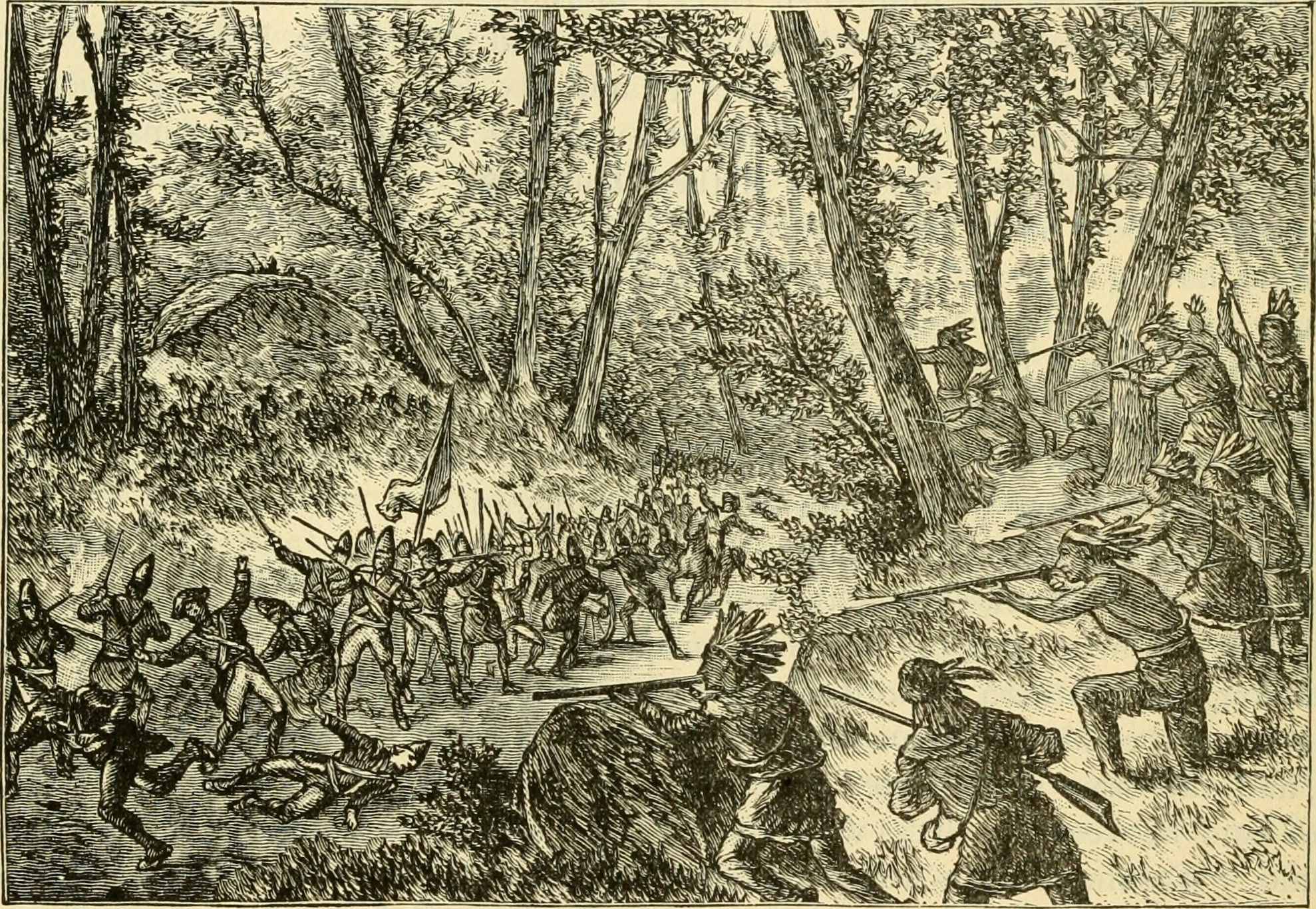
Indians ambushed the British army at the Battle of the Monongahela

Native Americans of multiple tribes fought on both sides of the French and Indian War. This war was all about tensions on each side of the border and the conflict that ensued. Some major tribes that fought during this war were the Iroquis and the Cherokee. These Native Americans were not trained in the European form of combat, yet they still found a way to defeat their enemies, such as the Battle of the Monongahela. The battle was a victory for the French and Native allies, and Hale C. Scipe states that "this was the most crushing defeat ever administered to a British Army on American Soil." The Native Americans vanquished trained soldiers. Some other Native American tactics in this war were to hide in the trees and bushes, then wait for the enemy to come so they could ambush them. After a battle, these people would also go and scalp the enemy, and sometimes steal whatever was found on the bodies. Though many of these Native Americans were fighting for the correct cause, many individuals were very hostile towards them, such as the Schupps Mill Massacre. This hostile massacre took place when Native Americans were helping refugees look after their livestock. Many were killed, and the rest of the Natives retreated. The war ended with the Treaty of Paris and greatly influenced the Revolutionary War because of the continuous dispute about borders after the treaty was signed.

== Revolutionary War ==
During the Revolutionary War, both the early American colonists and the British wanted Natives on their side. Some, like the Abenakis, were persuaded not by a "cause that was not their own", but by whichever side could provide them with "provisions". In the south, along the Mississippi River in the area of Natchez, the Choctaws and Chickasaws became allies of the British. Those tribes agreed to pressure the colonists to stay loyal to Britain, in return for goods given to them by the British. Later in the war, the agreement fell apart as Britain reneged on their end of the deal and the tribes began pillaging settlers for their own interests.

The Iroquois confederacy, an alliance of six Native American nations in New York that had existed in peace for hundreds of years, was divided by the Revolutionary War. Joseph Brant, part of the Mohawk tribe, attempted to convince other tribes to join the cause against the colonists. There was a differing of opinions amongst the Iroquois, with some supporting Brant and some not. While four of the tribes sided with the British, largely because of promises from the Crown that tribal land would be preserved, the Oneidas and the Tuscaroras sided with the colonists.

== War of 1812 ==
The origins of the War of 1812 are complex in nature, mostly revolving around trade issues and tensions between America and Britain. American colonists and Natives disputed over land, particularly in the great lakes and northern midwestern area.

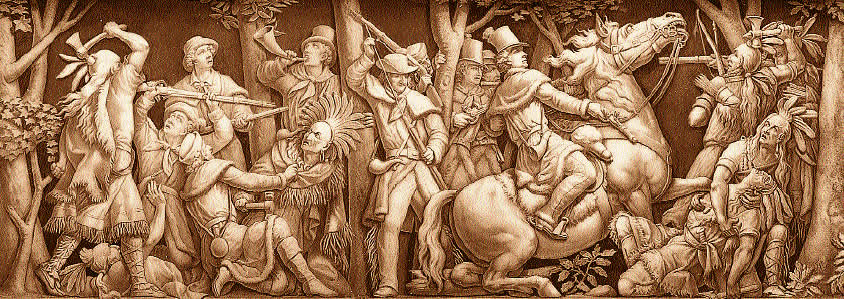
"The Death of Tecumseh" depicted on the Frieze of the Rotunda of the United States Capitol

The British Native's support on their side, such as the Tecumseh confederacy. Tecumseh was a prominent leader in the Shawnee tribe. He is known for working on creating an alliance between multiple Native American tribes "west of the Appalachian Mountains". His goal was to oppose the American colonists and white expansion. However, many tribes were not thrilled to join the confederacy and Tecumseh was killed at the 1813 Battle of the Thames; so, his quest turned out unsuccessful. Another alliance included the Menominee tribe.

Throughout the war, the Native Americans were a major player on the side of the British, with quite literally much of the "British dependence" resting on their shoulders. American officials strongly opposed the way Native people waged war—in their mind it seemed barbaric. This ended up being controversial on both the American and British sides, with the British also trying to limit the amount of brutal killing and America producing "propaganda about it". Native Americans struck fear into many hearts, both because of the way they painted themselves and dressed, and because of the reputation that followed them. However, because of all of this, Natives had both subtle and obvious power over both sides because of British dependence and American fear.

Americans also allied with Natives, although not as successfully as the British. Indians fought using their own methods, such as "ambushing". At the end of the war, in part because of the Treaty of Ghent, Indians did not get the promised lands and received little protection. Those tribes who supported the British "paid dearly" because of the later loss of their lands. Indians were very involved throughout the whole war, however, "it was also the last time that Indians played a major role in determining the future of the continent."

== Civil War ==
During the Civil War, many Native Americans enlisted in the Confederate Army, such as Thomas Sanderson. Sanderson enlisted in 1862 and participated in the bloody Battle of Antietam, a battle that killed thousands on both sides. Native Americans also were able to advance in rank, such as in Sanderson's case, where he was promoted to corporal, then full sergeant. Native Americans in the west also had ties to the Confederacy, though not through soldiers. Slave owners in the West were few, but the Confederacy found that these few slave owners had enough wealth to help them in their cause.

Towards the end of the Civil War, tensions between the Native Americans, the Union, and the Confederacy began escalating. The treaty that was signed between the Americans and the Natives promising 60 million acres to the Natives was compromised by the Americans because of the black gold that was found in those lands. Americans came in and took the land, violating any trust the Natives had gained with them during the time of the Civil War.

== American Indian Wars ==
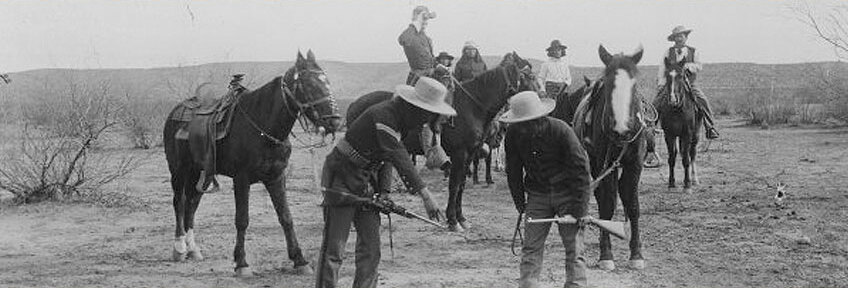
Soldiers and Indian scouts take observations before the Battle of Big Dry Wash (1882)

United States Army Indian Scouts were Native Americans enlisted to serve as guides, trackers, and interpreters in US army between 1866 and 1947. They helped the Army during the Indian Wars, using their terrain and tracking skills against rival tribes. Some earned the Medal of Honor.

== World War I ==
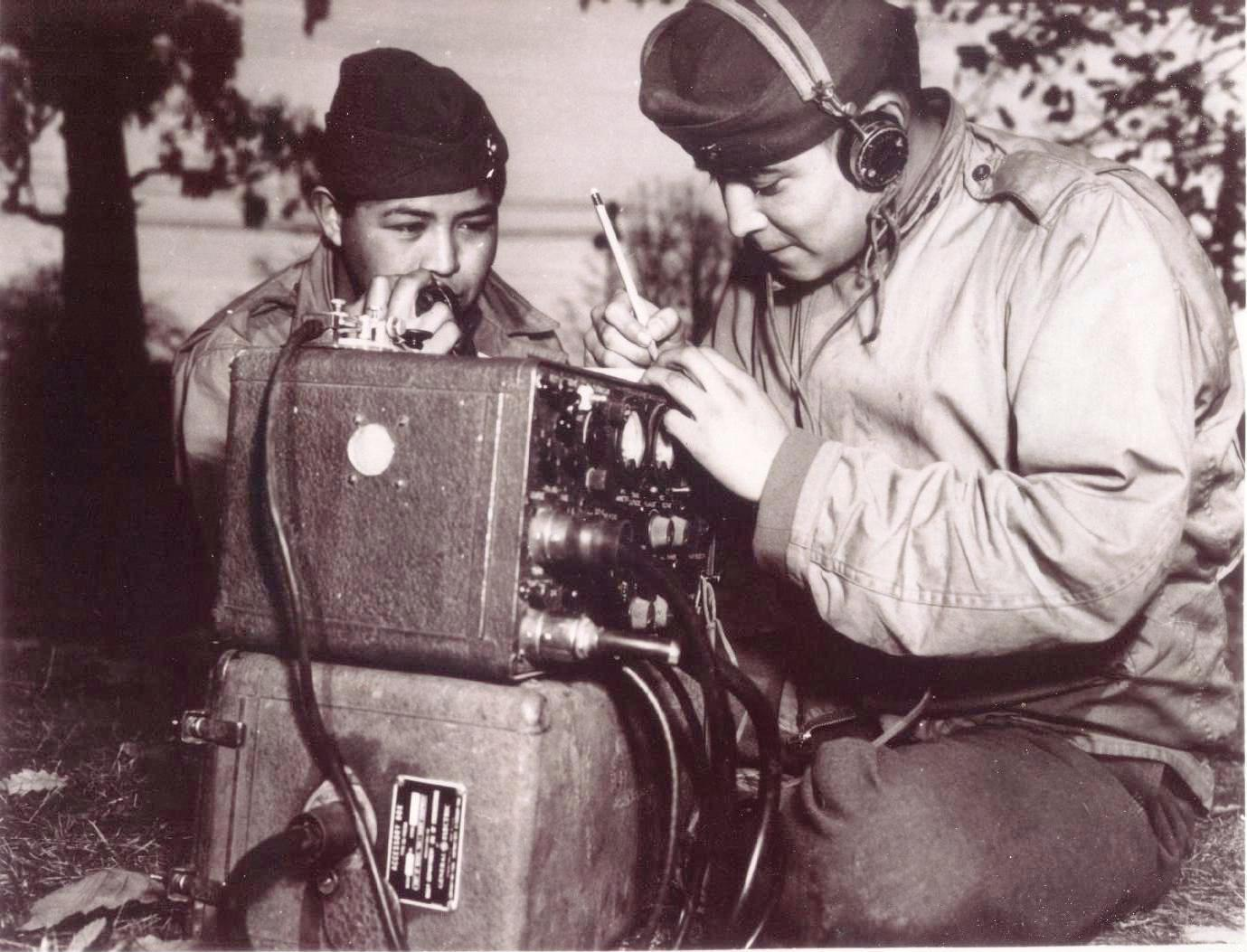
Code talkers at work.

Thousands of Native Americans joined the military during World War I, and had a massive impact on the war, especially in forms of communication across enemy lines and territory. Using Native Americans to help send messages first began when leaders in the American army realized how Native American languages could be used to communicate complex messages in languages that were little understood by outsiders. Previously, the Axis powers were able to decode many American messages, but the Indigenous languages of North America were almost impossible for Germans or other belligerents to understand. Many soldiers from different tribes were responsible for being code talkers. Below is a chart that will help the understanding of which tribe helped with code talking in which infantry.

Tribe	No.	Unit
Choctaw	(8)	Co. E, 142nd Inf. Reg., 36th Div. Later 18 men and 3 NCOs trained at Louppy-le-Petit.
Cherokee	NA	119th and 120th Inf. Regs., 30th Div. Cherokee Co. E, 142nd Inf. Reg., 36th Div
Comanche	(5)	357th Inf. Reg., 90th Div.
Osage	NA	Co. M, 143rd Inf. Reg., 36th Div
Winnebago	NA	Co. A, 7th Inf. Reg., 3rd Div.

There were many different types of Native American Code Talking, yet all helped to accomplish sending messages that could not be deciphered by the German forces. This was the fastest form of communication, Philip Johnston, a WWI veteran stated that "Navajos could encode, transmit, and decode a three-line message in 30 seconds" and that Code Talking was over 98 percent faster than the current encryption machines." Native American code talkers were beneficial both during WWI and after because the positive view of Native Americans and their languages after the war was greatly increased.

Partially in recognition of their service, on June 2, 1924, President Calvin Coolidge signed the Indian Citizenship Act, which granted U.S. citizenship to all Native Americans.

== World War II ==
See also: Native Americans and World War II
About 44,000 Native men and 800 women joined the military during World War II. There are many reasons that Natives joined the United States military, such as a way to advance their education or opportunities to earn money and receive life experience outside of their hometown. However, an important motive was "the warrior tradition—the tradition of protecting their people".

During World War II, the military sent coded messages by way of Code talkers. These were Native Americans who encoded messages into their Native language. This was used in World War I and then grew more significant during World War II. Natives from tribes such as the Comanche, Meskwaki, Chippewa, Oneida, Hopi, and Navajo worked as code talkers, with varying representation from each tribe. There was even a school set up to train code-talkers, who were both enlisted and drafted.

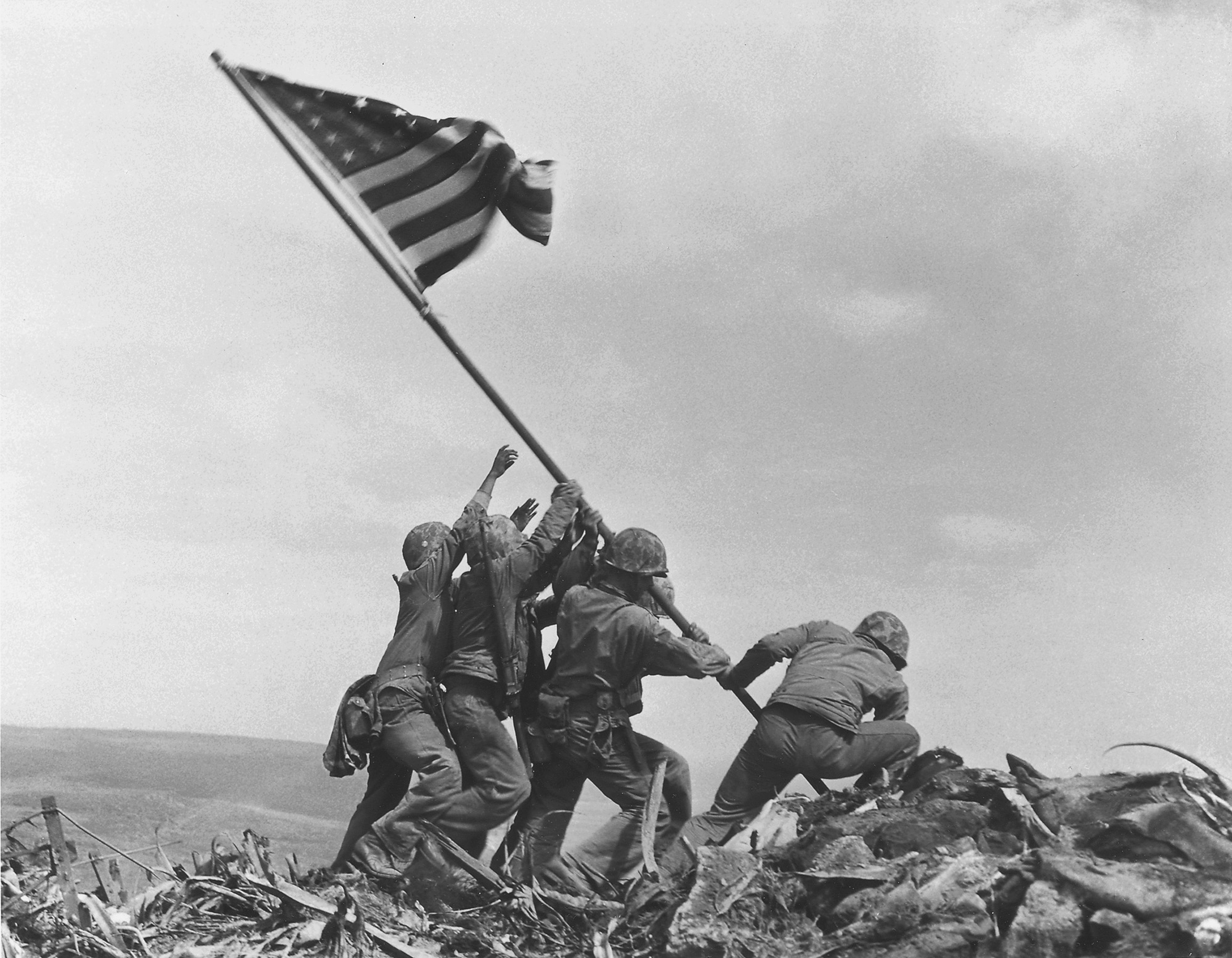
The raising of the flag on Mount Suribachi in Iwo Jima. Ira Hayes is the marine on the far left.

Ira Hayes was a Native American that became very well known because of WWII. He trained as a Marine paratrooper and saw combat in Bougainville and Iwo Jima. It was at Iwo Jima that he was documented with four other soldiers raising an American flag, which then became a very famous picture. He suffered after the war from what could have been PTSD. He is represented in the Marine Corps War Memorial in Arlington, Virginia.

In the famous picture of six Americans raising the American flag on Mount Suribachi, Ira Hayes is the marine on the left, raising his hands up towards the flag.

== Vietnam War ==
Like many of the soldiers that fought in the Vietnam War, Native American soldiers experienced and saw terrible atrocities. About "one of four eligible Native people compared to about one of twelve non-Natives served," which in all numbered about 42,000. Of those who were not drafted, which turned out to be quite a few, their motivation stemmed essentially from the "family and tribal traditions of service."

Both Native men and women fought in Vietnam War. One Native woman Donna Lorring, was a communications specialist. She was between the age of 18–21 when she served and her post was the Long Binh Post.

Because of the atrocities they experienced, Native Americans came back home to their tribes with emotional trauma and were more likely to suffer from PTSD. However, many have been welcomed home with ceremonies meant to honor them for service. This has helped some veterans feel like they have a place in their communities and help transition back to civilian life. It helps veterans feel like they have a place because it connects them with the role of a warrior, which has a deep interconnected "relationship with the community." However, many female veterans don't experience the same inclusion in these veteran communities as their male counterparts.

Some Native Vietnam soldiers saw similarities between the war "fought by whites against their ancestors". It was similar to how the American soldiers "relocat[ed] entire Vietnamese village populations". Some Native veterans became politically active in the Indigenous Rights Movement (aka Red Power Movement). Some participated in protest events such as the 71-day occupation at Wounded Knee, South Dakota in 1973.

== Post-Vietnam to present day ==
As of November 2021, the total number of men and women who serve in the military on active duty numbered more than 24,000. This includes both "American Indian and Alaskan Native." Additionally "more than 183,000 veterans identify as American Indian or Alaskan Native."

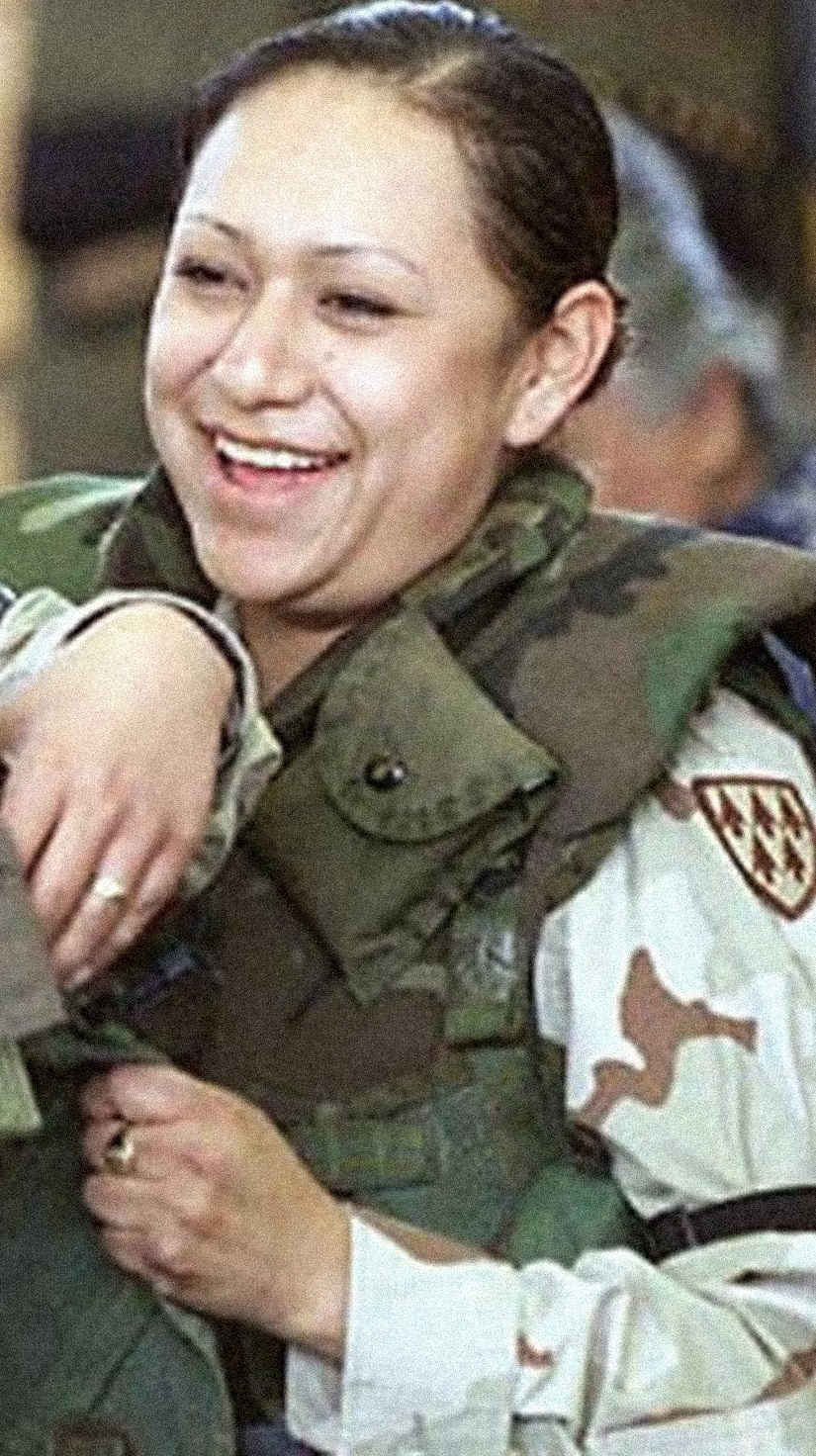
Lori Piestewa: Member of the 507th Maintenance Company

Native Americans have participated in the armed forces throughout conflicts in the Middle East. During one mission, Operation Enduring Freedom, which took place in Afghanistan from 2001 to 2014, "some 30 American Indians and Alaska Natives were killed and 188 wounded." Also, "43 American Indians died while 344 were wounded in Operation Iraqi Freedom which lasted from 2003–2010.

Some specific units had some of the "highest proportion of American Indians," such as the 120th Engineer Combat Battalion at 20 percent.

Lori Piestewa, who was a member of the 507th Maintenance Company, was killed in combat in Iraq in 2003. She was part of the Hopi Tribe. She was the first Native American woman to die in combat while serving in the U.S. military and the first woman in the U.S. military killed in the Iraq War. Squaw Peak in Arizona was renamed Piestewa Peak after her. There is also an annual event which is named in memory of her: Lori Piestewa National Native American Games.

In September 2004, the 120th Engineer Combat Battalion received permission to help organize an official powwow. This occurred in Iraq. Soldiers, both Native and non-Native participated in traditional Native American games. They even made a drum from an old oil drum. This powwow was the "first one ever known to be a full-blown powwow in a combat zone."

== Recognition and memorials ==
Code talkers were given honors by the United States, as well as France. The Navajo tribe received acknowledgement first as their activities were more well-known, but when previous code talkers from other tribes and conflicts were made known, they also received recognition. On November 15, 2008, The Code Talkers Recognition Act of 2008 (Public Law 110-420), was signed into law by President George W. Bush, which recognizes every Native American code talker who served in the United States military during World War I or World War II, with the exception of the already-awarded Navajo, with a Congressional Gold Medal for his tribe, to be retained by the Smithsonian Institution, and a silver medal duplicate to each code talker.

The National Museum of the American Indian opened on September 21, 2004. It is part of the Smithsonian Institution.

== See also ==
- American Indian Wars
- American Revolutionary War
- Native Americans and World War II
- Native Americans in the American Civil War
- United States Armed Forces
