= Baal Müller =

German writer and publisher

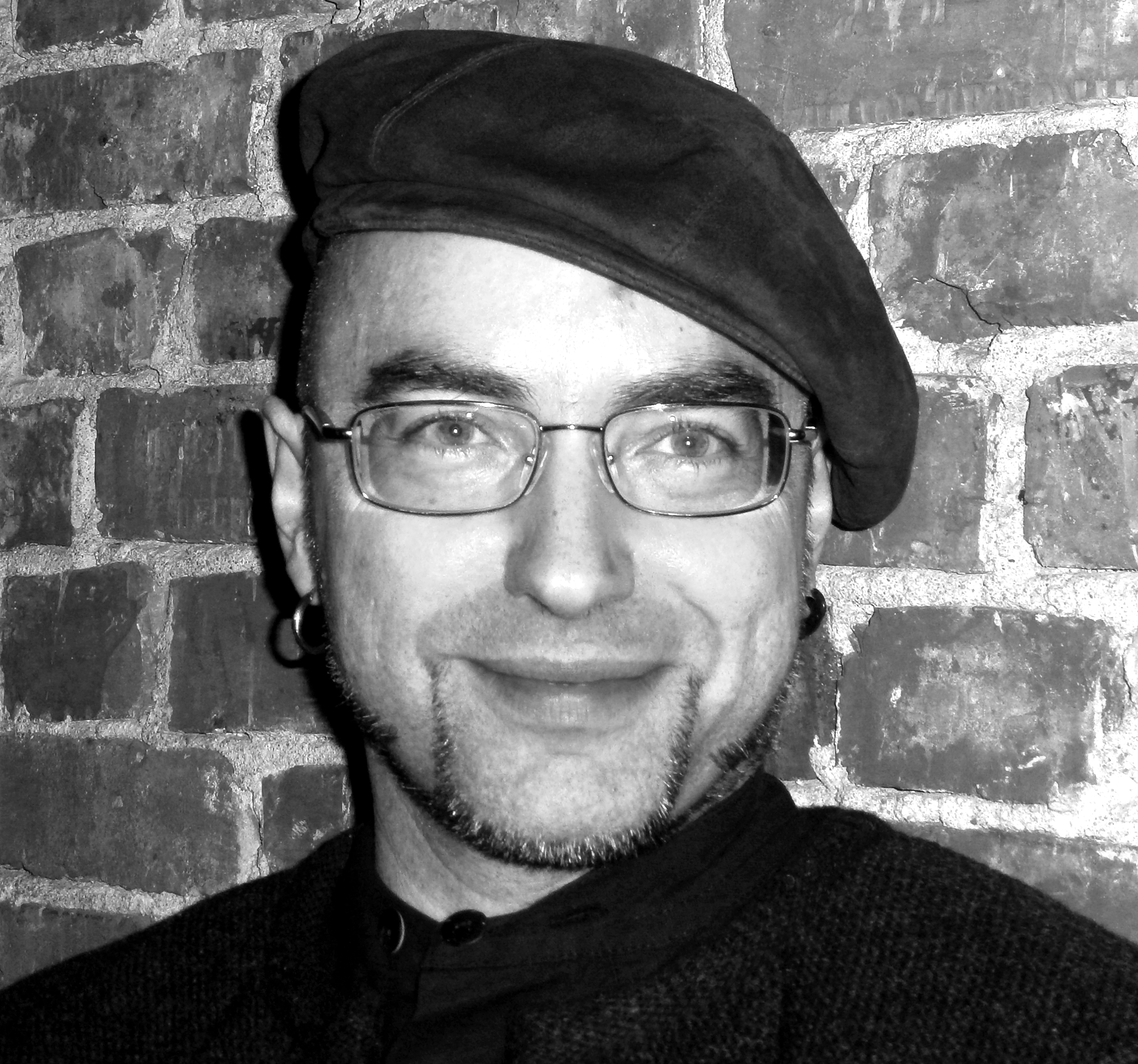
Müller in 2012

Baal Müller (born 21 December 1969 as Carsten Müller) is a German writer and publisher associated with the German New Right. He operated the publishing house Telesma-Verlag from 2003 to 2015 and is known as a promoter of neopaganism.

== Life and work ==
Carsten Müller was born on 21 December 1969 in Frankfurt and grew up in Kelkheim, Bad Schwalbach and Michelstadt. He decided to replace his birth name with the theonym Baal. In 2003 he acquired the publishing house Telesma-Verlag. In 2004 he obtained a doctorate from the University of Tübingen on a dissertation about Ludwig Klages, Alfred Schuler and the Munich Cosmic Circle. The dissertation forms the basis for his 2007 monograph Kosmik. He sold Telesma-Verlag in 2015 and it became an imprint of Arnshaugk-Verlag.

Müller is a practitioner and promoter of neopaganism, which he characterizes as a "religion of experience" (German: Erfahrungsreligion) where gods are understood as "basic qualities or basic characters of the world". Formerly a member of the Germanic neopagan organizations Eldaring and Verein für germanisches Heidentum, his version of paganism is close to that of the historian and philosopher Reinhard Falter, one of his frequent collaborators. As religious influences, Müller has mentioned Friedrich Nietzsche, Klages, Schuler, Walter F. Otto, Mircea Eliade, "in some respects" Carl Jung, and the poets Stefan George, Gottfried Benn, Rainer Maria Rilke, Theodor Däubler and Rudolf Pannwitz. Müller and Falter distance themselves from the racial theories and antisemitism associated with some of these writers. In the introduction to Schuler's collected writings, which Müller edited in 1997, Müller writes that Schuler's "anti-Judaism is not a racist anti-Semitism, but an anti-monotheism motivated by vitalism."

Müller is politically engaged within the German New Right, having been a columnist for the magazines Junge Freiheit and Sezession, the latter published by the New Right think tank Institut für Staatspolitik. He is critical of restorationist approaches to culture and reliance on conspiracy theories to explain decline, instead promoting a cyclical view of culture and civilization influenced by Oswald Spengler. He has held readings at the New Right gathering the Orphischer Kreis and spoken at anti-Islam, far-right Pegida rallies, where he has condemned what he calls the "lying press" and established parties. In January 2019 he began to work for the nationalist and right-wing populist party Alternative for Germany, handling press and social media for the party's parliamentary group in the Bavarian State Parliament. According to the Süddeutsche Zeitung, Müller's New Right activities and use of rhetoric close to that of the Identitarian movement made his employment controversial within the party.

== Selected publications ==
- Alfred Schuler: Cosmogonische Augen. Gesammelte Schriften (editor). Igel Verlag, Paderborn 1997, ISBN 978-3-89621-052-4.
- Alfred Schuler. Der letzte Römer (editor). Castrum Peregrini, Amsterdam 2000, ISBN 90-6034-107-4.
- Die Nibelungen. Nach alten Quellen neu erzählt. Arun, Uhlstädt-Kirchhasel 2005, ISBN 3-935581-63-7.
- Alfred Schuler: Gesammelte Werke (editor). Telesma, Munich 2007, ISBN 978-3-9810057-4-5.
- Kosmik. Prozeßontologie und temporale Poetik bei Ludwig Klages und Alfred Schuler. Zur Philosophie und Dichtung der Schwabinger Kosmischen Runde. Telesma, Munich 2007, ISBN 978-3-9810057-3-8.
- Der Vorsprung der Besiegten. Identität nach der Niederlage. Edition Antaios, Schnellroda 2009, ISBN 978-3-935063-84-5.
- Wendische Fahrt. Gedichte. Arnshaugk, Neustadt an der Orla 2016, ISBN 978-3-944064-64-2.
- Hildebrands Nibelungenlied. Arnshaugk, Neustadt an der Orla 2017, ISBN 978-3-944064-85-7.
- Die Selbstzerstörung der Demokratie. Deutschland am Abgrund. J.K. Fischer Verlag, Gelnhausen 2020, ISBN 978-3-96850-001-0.
