= The Homeric Gods =

1929 book by Walter F. Otto

- The Homeric Gods: Spiritual Significance of Greek Religion (1954 English language edition)
- Author: Walter F. Otto
- Original title: Die Götter Griechenlands
- Translator: Moses Hadas
- Language: German
- Subject: Ancient Greek religion
- Publisher: Friedrich Cohen
- Publication date: 1929
- Publication place: Germany
- English publication date: 1954
- Media type: Print (Hardcover and Paperback)
- Pages: 371 (first edition)

The Homeric Gods: Spiritual Significance of Greek Religion (German: Die Götter Griechenlands. Das Bild des Göttlichen im Spiegel des griechischen Geistes, lit. 'The Gods of Greece: The Image of the Divine in the Mirror of the Greek Spirit') is a book about ancient Greek religion, published in 1929 and written by the philologist Walter F. Otto. Its main thesis is that the Greek religion was focused on the profundity of natural experiences, and therefore used less magical thinking than Asian religions, which tend to focus more on miracles. According to Otto, this reached its greatest expression in the works of Homer, where the Greek gods are portrayed as present in the natural world as particular forms of existence.

The book has both been praised for its insights and larger arguments and criticized for its approach and errors. Otto's ontological approach to polytheism had an impact on a number of scholars and influenced the structuralist study of ancient religions.

== Background ==
Walter F. Otto (1874 – 1958) was a professor of classical philology at the University of Frankfurt. He belonged to the German philhellenic tradition of Winckelmann, Goethe, Hölderlin and Nietzsche. He was the main representative of a current in philology that stressed the existential and intuitive in the study of myths, which generated much enthusiasm in German academia in the 1920s and 1930s. It led to an ontological approach to understanding the gods, as opposed to understanding them as products of culture, history or society. Otto's fundamental views on religion were close to those of Ulrich von Wilamowitz-Moellendorff and Leo Frobenius.

Otto was an anti-establishment conservative, held contact with the George-Kreis and understood his own works as part of an attempt to revitalize Europe. The historian Hubert Mohr said the main sources for his interpretation of Greek theology in The Homeric Gods (1929) and Dionysus (1933) were Nietzsche, Friedrich Wilhelm Joseph Schelling, the Cosmics—a neopagan group involving Alfred Schuler, Stefan George and Ludwig Klages—and Martin Heidegger.

The German title, Die Götter Griechenlands, is borrowed from Friedrich Schiller's poem "Die Götter Griechenlandes", published in March 1788 in Der Teutsche Merkur.

== Summary ==
Otto writes that many people appreciate the lifelikeness and beauty of ancient Greek sculptures, yet will assess Greek religion as primitive or naturalistic, because they use oriental religions as the standard for measurement. Otto writes that the Greek religion should be examined on its own merits. Unlike Yahweh in the Old Testament, the gods in the Iliad and the Odyssey almost never perform miracles, but are present in experiences such as a clever thought, the awakening of enthusiasm and the ignition of courage. According to Otto, the Greek conception of divine power differed from the Asian in that it was not based on magical thinking, but saw the natural world in the light of the divine. This reached its greatest expression in the epic poetry of Homer, which Otto uses throughout to support his theses.

Otto interprets Titans, Erinyes and Gorgons as remnants from an older religion, and contrasts these chthonic and grotesque beings with Homer's more humanlike Olympian gods. The difference is noticeable in comparisons with Hesiod, who retains many pre-Homeric features. The older deities are powerful through magic, whereas Homer's Olympians are powerful because they are connected to the being of nature.

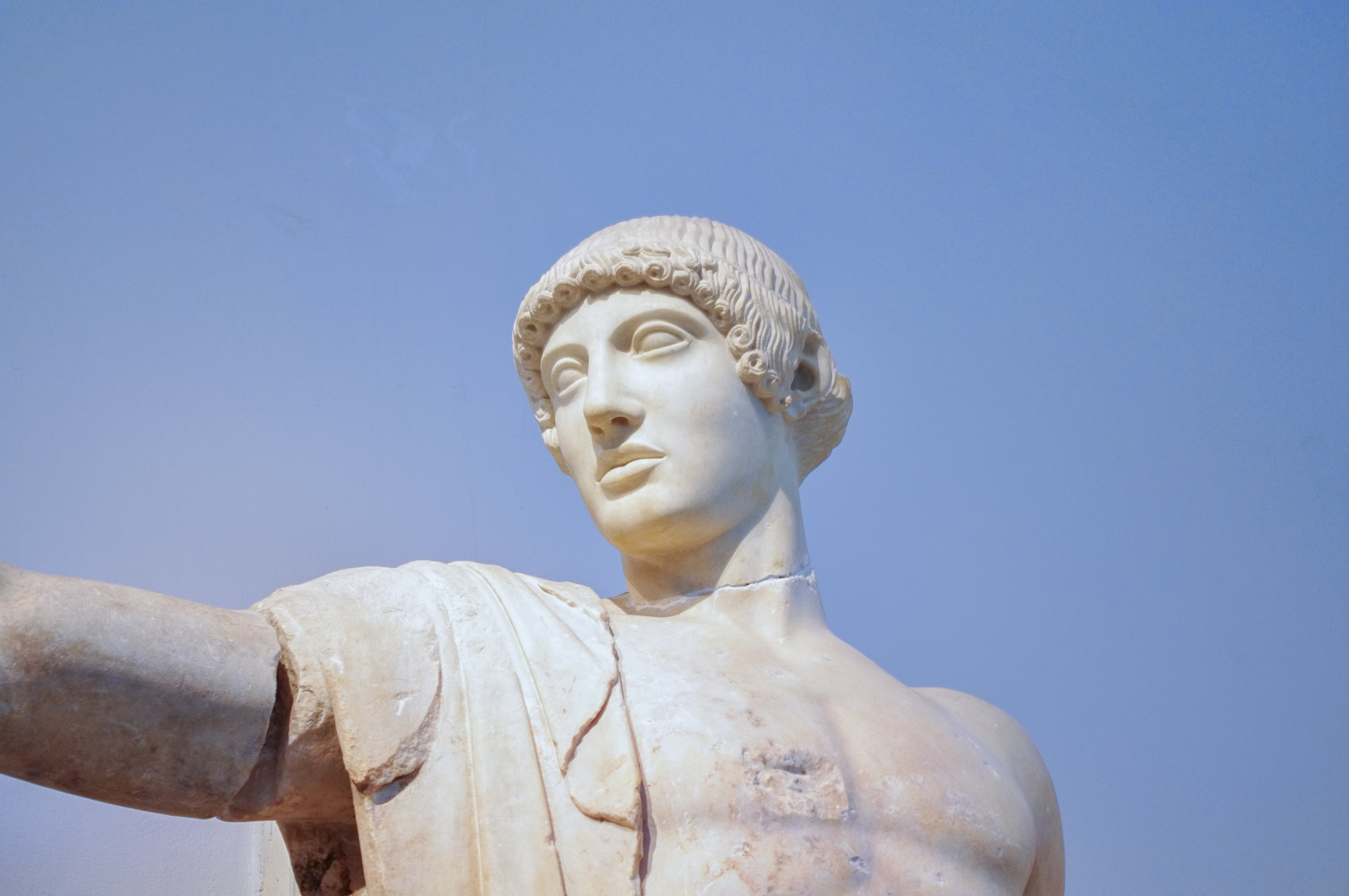
According to Otto, Homeric religion is expressed in the Apollon of Olympia, "a vivid representation of what is loftiest, most eminent, and at the same time brightest".

Analysing the Homeric gods, Otto does not give Zeus a separate treatment, because all divinity converges in him. Athena belongs to the immediate present and the clarity of action, where she provides level-headedness, quick-wittedness and boldness for men, and skill in handicraft for women. Apollo and Artemis signify the distance between gods and humans and thus humanity's limitations. Apollo embodies the divine in self-knowledge, measure and intelligent order, and is associated with the sun, form and masculinity. His twin sister Artemis is associated with untouched nature, development and femininity; she teaches hunters, leads the way on journeys and presides over childbirth. Aphrodite is the goddess of rapture, spring and powerful yearning, and appears in prosperous sea journeys and blooming nature. Hermes is associated with luck, the nocturnal and travel, exhibiting the Olympian traits but also a connection to the pre-Homeric order of magic. Homer's gods are immortal, ageless, beautiful and tall. They reside in the aether but are present in the natural world. The presence of Poseidon, Hephaestus and Dionysus is limited in the epics, because Homer's gods are sublime entities who manifest their particular spirit in the totality of the world; they are not bound to elements, nor do they represent individual virtues or functions. They unify spirit and nature, which is reflected in Greek sculptures. Their connection to the natural world also explains their humanlike form, as humans are the highest natural forms.

Homer's religion has a myth of the world as opposed to a myth of the soul: the gods provide depth and significance to humans who are active in the world. Free will is complicated because there is no logical border between human and divine activity. The favour of a god can be won through insight or a talent the god appreciates. When gods reveal themselves, it happens in ways that are outwardly natural, and the work of a god is sometimes not recognized as such until a poet points it out. By being timeless, the gods direct humans away from the personal and towards the essentiality of nature; their temper is always inclined to the general, impersonal and non-sensual. Ancient Greek poets honoured the divine in any eternal image of life, even if it was morally offensive. The gods have requirements, but those exist as living ideals, not moral laws. Fate, or Moira, is in Homer's works an impersonal order that limits life. The gods affirm life, allow human greatness and can intervene against avoidable acts, but they have no power over the unavoidable fate of death, and ultimately they always execute Moira's law.

== Publication history ==
The first German edition of The Homeric Gods was published in 1929 by Friedrich Cohen in Bonn. The publisher had been responsible for several works by Otto's former teacher Hermann Usener, and for Platons Mythen (1927) by Karl Reinhardt, one of Otto's colleagues. Within its genre, The Homeric Gods was a success. By 1970 it had been published in six German editions without revisions and translated into multiple languages.

== Reception ==
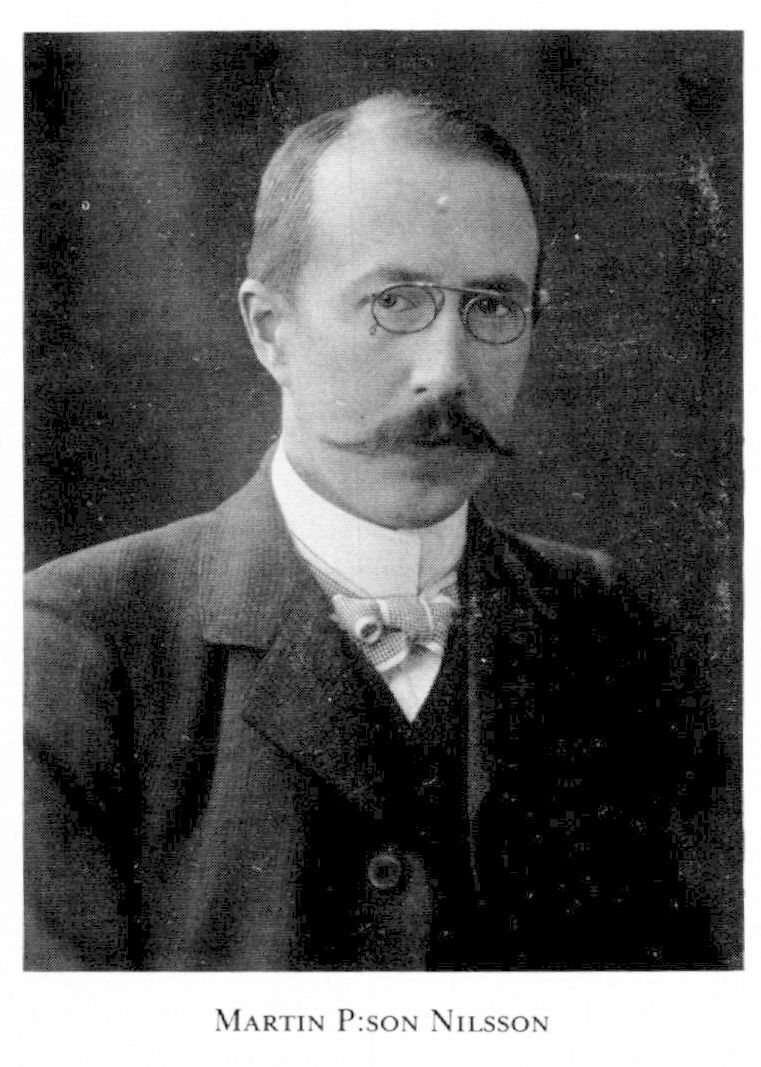
Martin P. Nilsson thought the book was delusional.

Upon the original publication, Otto Weinreich wrote in the Frankfurter Zeitung that Otto "looks deeper and further" than Georges Méautis and Tadeusz Stefan Zieliński in two recent books that also reassess Greek religion. Weinreich wrote that the "one-sidedness" of Otto's book is both its strength and weakness, and that it brings up aspects that must be considered by everybody who studies ancient Greece. The philologist Martin P. Nilsson, who represented a rivaling approach where cult was placed at the centre of ancient theology, was highly critical in his 1929 review, railing against the mystic approach in Otto's book which he considered delusional.

The British classical scholar H. J. Rose reviewed Moses Hadas' English translation in 1956. He noted a number of translation errors, and wrote about the book itself: "I find that a work, admittedly containing some good ideas here and there, which has so large a proportion of mere windy rhetoric and so many statements either certainly wrong or very doubtful (I noted about thirty) is but ill suited for the kind of reader the translator has chiefly in view." Edith Hamilton on the other hand praised it for being "a book about the Olympians written with religious fervor."

In his book Greek Religion (1977), Walter Burkert wrote: "Die Götter Griechenlands (1929) is a challenging attempt to take the Homeric gods seriously as gods, in defiance of 2,500 years of criticism: the gods enjoy an absolute actuality as Urphänomene in Goethe's sense of the term. This path, which ends in a sublime private religion, is not one which can be taken by everyone, but the work still radiates a powerful force of attraction." In 2016, Carson Bay wrote in Reviews in Religion & Theology that the book contains much that is objectionable to scholars, but still, Otto's "arguments come from deep Homeric readings and, if it is easy to find particular points in which he errs, it is less easy to dismiss his larger arguments and descriptions. For classicists and religionists, this book presents a robust, even inspiring, macro-argument for understanding Homeric religion, and an opportunity briefly to glimpse a past when philologists wrote comfortably at the head of the 'theoretical' disciplines."

== Legacy ==
The Homeric Gods is Otto's most famous work and together with Dionysus his only work that scholars of classics still read with some regularity. With this and other books, Otto influenced a number of scholars and students, notably Károly Kerényi. The ontological approach had an influence on the structuralist study of ancient polytheism and can be seen as a precursor to later ontological turns in anthropology. The Neue Deutsche Biographie describes Otto's two major works from the Weimar Republic—The Homeric Gods and Dionysus—as not only contributions to the study of Greek religion, but also documentations of the religious studies in Germany during the Weimar era and its demise.

== See also ==
- Homeric scholarship
- Archaic Greece
- Orientalizing period
- Natural religion
