= Fanny zu Reventlow =

German writer, artist and translator

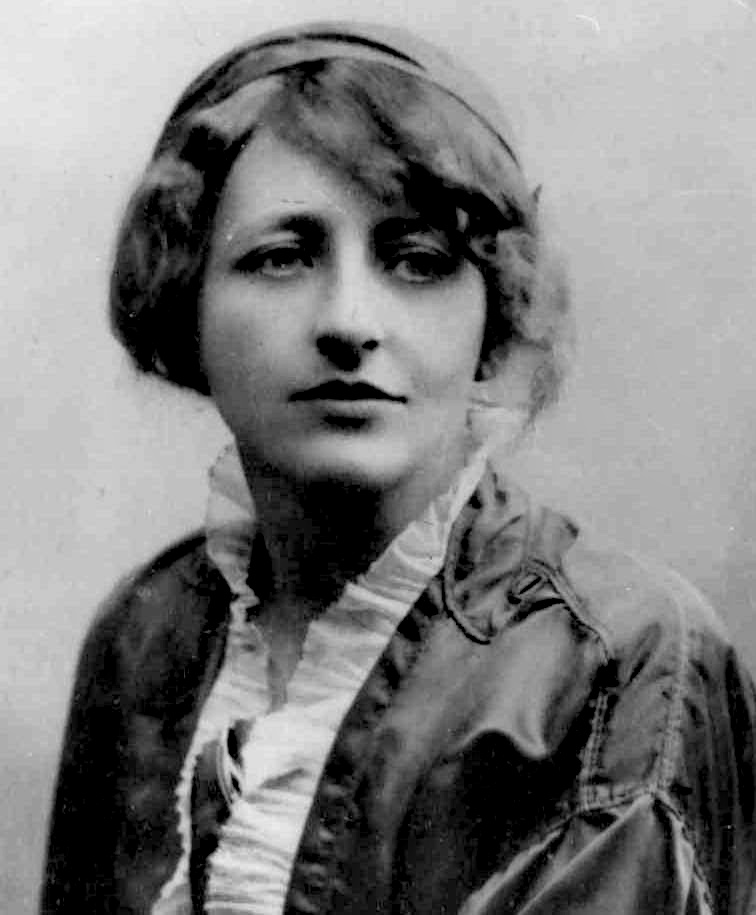
Franziska Countess zu Reventlow, undated photo

Countess Fanny "Franziska" zu Reventlow (Fanny Liane Wilhelmine Sophie Auguste Adrienne) 18 May 1871 – 26 July 1918) was a German writer, artist and translator, who became famous as the "Bohemian Countess" of Schwabing (an entertainment district in Munich) in the years leading up to World War I.

== Life ==
Fanny (or Franziska, as she was also called later) Reventlow was born in the family seat at Husum into the German nobility, the fifth of six children of Ludwig, Count zu Reventlow (1825–1894) and his wife Emilie (1834–1905). The family were on friendly terms with the North German writer Theodor Storm. Her eldest brother Theodor died as a fifteen-year-old, her other brother Ernst, was an ultra-nationalist writer and eventually became a Nazi.

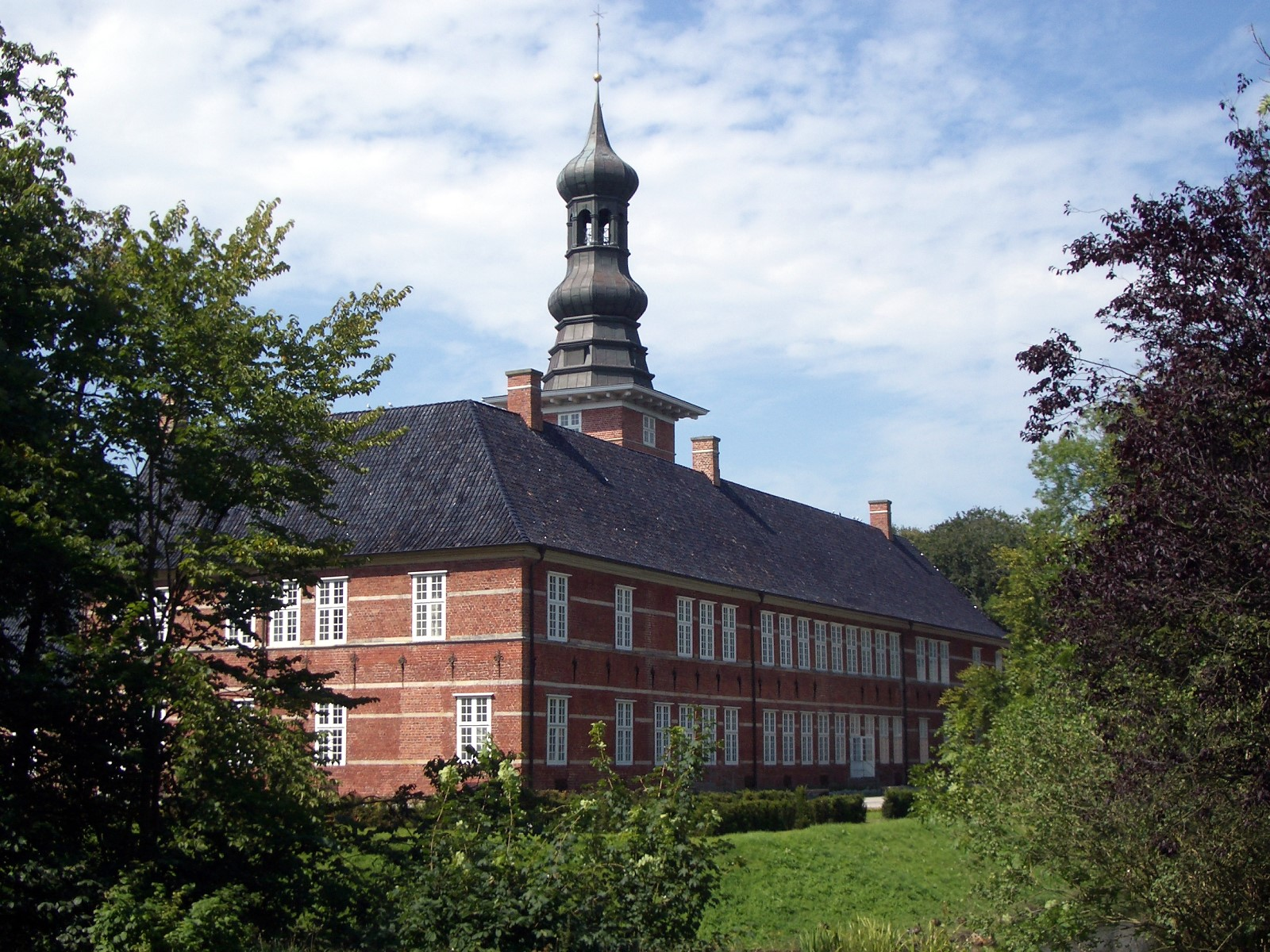
The family Schloss at Husum

While young she was in constant conflict with her mother. She was thrown out of boarding school for misbehavior and lack of respect for the authorities. After being sent to stay with a family friend in 1893, she fled to Hamburg. Here she met Walter Lübke, who financed her art studies in Munich, and whom she married in 1894. Her artistic studies also included singing, with instruction by Charlotte Lachs.

The marriage broke up when she set off again in 1895 to Munich, to continue her studies. They were divorced in 1897. In September of that year her son Rolf was born; she never divulged the name of the father (although it is very likely to have been the Polish-born painter & engraver Adolf Eduard Herstein).

In Munich she supported herself by translation work for the Albert Langen Publishing House and by writing short articles for magazines and newspapers such as Simplicissimus and the Frankfurter Zeitung. After taking some acting lessons in 1898, she had a short engagement at the Theater am Gärtnerplatz. Otherwise she took casual jobs as a secretary, assistant cook, insurance agent and so on to keep going. As usual in Bohemian circles, she also received financial help from male friends and casual acquaintances.

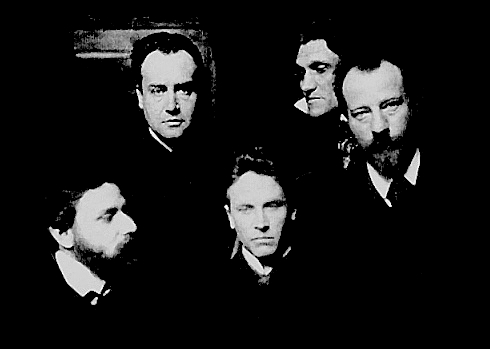
Karl Wolfskehl, Alfred Schuler, Ludwig Klages, Stefan George, Albert Verwey. Photograph by Karl Bauer

She was a friend of Ludwig Klages and thus became part of the Munich Cosmic Circle based around the mystic Alfred Schuler, which also included Karl Wolfskehl. It broke up in acrimonious circumstances in 1904. She wrote about her experiences with the Circle in her Roman à clef Herrn Dames Aufzeichnungen (1913). She also got to know Theodor Lessing, Erich Mühsam, Oskar Panizza, Rainer Maria Rilke, Marianne von Werefkin, Alexej von Jawlensky, Frank Wedekind and many others of the "Munich Moderns". With her son she travelled to Samos (1900), Italy (1904, 1907) and Corfu (1906/1907).

She left Munich for Ascona in Switzerland in 1910 (Monte Verità), where she wrote her "Schwabing" novels. In 1911 married Baron Alexander von Rechenberg-Linten, a marriage of convenience, which enabled him to inherit 20,000 Marks. However, he lost this in a bank collapse in 1914.

In 1916 she moved to Muralto on Lago Maggiore. She died in 1918 in a clinic in Locarno following a bicycle accident and was buried in the cemetery of the Santa Maria in Selva church in Locarno. Emil Ludwig spoke at her funeral.

== Feminism ==
Reventlow is best known as one of the most unorthodox voices of the early women's movement in Europe. While many of her peers were pressing for improved social, political, and economic rights for women, Reventlow argued that ardent feminists, whom she labelled "viragos," were actually harming women by attempting to erase or deny the natural differences between men and women. Reventlow maintained that sexual freedom, and the abolition of the institution of marriage, were the best means by which women could hope to achieve a more equal social standing with men.

== Works ==
- (with Otto Eugen Thossan) Klosterjungen. Humoresken (two stories), Wigand, Leipzig 1897
- Das Männerphantom der Frau (Essay), in: Zürcher Diskußionen 1898
- Was Frauen ziemt (Essay); under the title Viragines oder Hetären? in: Zürcher Diskußionen 1899
- Erziehung und Sittlichkeit (Essay), in: Otto Falckenberg, Das Buch von der Lex Heinze. Leipzig 1900
- Ellen Olestjerne, J. Marchlewski, Munich 1903
- Von Paul zu Pedro, Langen, Munich 1912
- Herrn Dames Aufzeichnungen oder Begenheiten aus einem merkwürdigen Stadtteil, Langen, Munich 1913
- Der Geldkomplex, Langen, Munich 1916
- Das Logierhaus zur Schwankenden Weltkugel und andere Novellen, Langen, Munich 1917
- Tagebücher (ed. Irene Weiser, Jürgen Gutsch), Stutz, Passau 2006

== Sources ==
- Stein, Gerd (1982). Bohemien-Tramp-Sponti (in German). Fischer. ISBN 3-596-25035-8.
- Wendt, Gunna (2008). Franziska zu Reventlow. Die anmutige Rebellin. Biographie (in German). Aufbau-Verlag. ISBN 978-3-351-02660-8.
- Egbringhoff, Ulla (2000). Franziska zu Reventlow (in German). Reinbek (rm 614). ISBN 3-499-50614-9.
