= Elsa Bruckmann =

- Princess Cantacuzène of Romania
- Born: 23 February 1865
- Died: 7 June 1946 (aged 81)
- Husband: Hugo Bruckmann
- House: Cantacuzene

Elsa Bruckmann (23 February 1865 – 7 June 1946), born Princess Cantacuzène of Romania was the Munich publisher of Houston Stewart Chamberlain. She held the "Salon Bruckmann" and made it her mission to introduce Adolf Hitler to leading industrialists.

== Biography ==
She was born in Traundorf near Gmunden in Upper Austria. Her father was Prince Theodore Cantacuzène, a Royal Bavarian Ulan officer. They were descendants of an old Greek Byzantine princely dynasty. Her mother was Countess Caroline Deym von Střitež, from a Bohemian-Austrian noble family. She married Hugo Bruckmann, a Munich art book publisher in 1898.

Bruckmann and her husband financially supported International Modernism in art and design. In 1899 Houston Stewart Chamberlain read at Elsa Bruckmann's first salon in January 1899. Attendees at their salon included Rainer Maria Rilke, Heinrich Wölfflin, Rudolf Kassner, Hermann Graf Keyserling, Karl Wolfskehl, Ludwig Klages, Harry Graf Kessler, Alfred Schuler, Georg Simmel, Hjalmar Schacht and her nephew Norbert von Hellingrath.

During World War 1 and in the Weimar Republic Bruckmann and her husband allied themselves with the political radical right in Bavaria. Bruckmann's initial interest in Social Darwinism developed into xenophobic nationalism, paired with racist anti-Semitism. Elsa Bruckmann actively supported Nazism, after attending a speech by Hitler at the Circus Krone in 1921. Hitler first attended their salon on 23 December 1924. Bruckmann introduced Hitler to Paul Troost, who went on to become Hitler's first state architect.

The Bruckmanns joined the Nazi Party in 1932, but this was back-dated to 1925 with honorary membership numbers 91 (Elsa) and 92 (Hugo).

== See also ==
- Alfred Schuler
