= Regina Ullmann =

Swiss poet and writer (1884–1961)

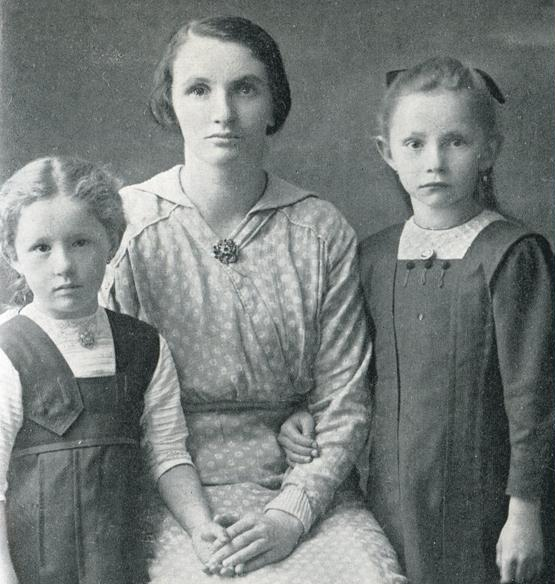
- Camilla, Regina and Gerda Ullmann
- Born: 14 December 1884; St. Gallen, Switzerland
- Died: 6 January 1961 (aged 76); Ebersberg, Germany
- Occupation: Writer
- Children: 2
- Writing career
- Language: German
- Period: 1907–1954
- Notable work: Die Landstraße

Regina "Rega" Ullmann (14 December 1884 – 6 January 1961) was a Swiss poet and writer.

== Life ==
Ullmann was the second daughter of a Jewish-Austrian embroidery businessman, Richard Ullmann, and his German wife Hedwig. She was born in the Swiss town of St. Gallen, but in 1902, following her father's death in 1887, she and her mother moved to Munich, where she first read such influential poets such Ina Seidel, Hans Carossa, Ludwig Derleth and Rainer Maria Rilke. She began a correspondence with Rilke, who became a major supporter and mentor; the two met for the first time in 1912.

In January 1906, Ullmann gave birth to an illegitimate daughter, Gerta, in Vienna. The father was the economist Hanns Dorn. A second child, Camilla, followed in 1908 following a relationship with psychoanalyst Otto Gross. Ullmann left both children to grow up with foster parents, though she visited them regularly and oversaw their education.

Ullmann converted to Catholicism in 1911, apparently under Ludwig Derleth's influence, after which her work was characterised by a more "pious" attention to what she perceived as the religious mystery inherent in everyday life.

Unmarried and without work, Ullmann suffered from severe depression, exacerbated by her mother's suicide by hanging. With her first collection of short stories, however – Die Landstraße – she gradually became better known. With Rilke's help, she acquired some financial support for her writing, first from her publisher and later from Swiss patrons and Catholic aid agencies.

The Nazis expelled her from the German Writers Association in 1935 because of her Jewish ancestry, and the following year she left Germany, moving to Austria where her mother died in 1938. Following the Anschluss, she returned to St. Gallen, Switzerland, where she remained and worked for some twenty years, until shortly before her death. In the final months of her life, she returned to Germany and stayed in a nursing home under the care of her daughter Camilla. She died on Epiphany 1961 in Ebersberg.

== Works ==
=== Lyrics ===
- Von der Erde des Lebens, 1910
- Die Landstrasse, 1921 (The Country Road, translated by Kurt Beals, New Directions 2015, ISBN 9780811220057)
- Die Barockkirche, 1925
- Vom Brot der Stillen, 2 Bände, 1932
- Der Apfel in der Kirche, 1934
- Der Engelskranz, 1942
- Madonna auf Glas, 1944

=== Other works ===
- Erinnerungen an Rilke, 1947
