= Hugo Bruckmann =

German publisher and Nazi supporter

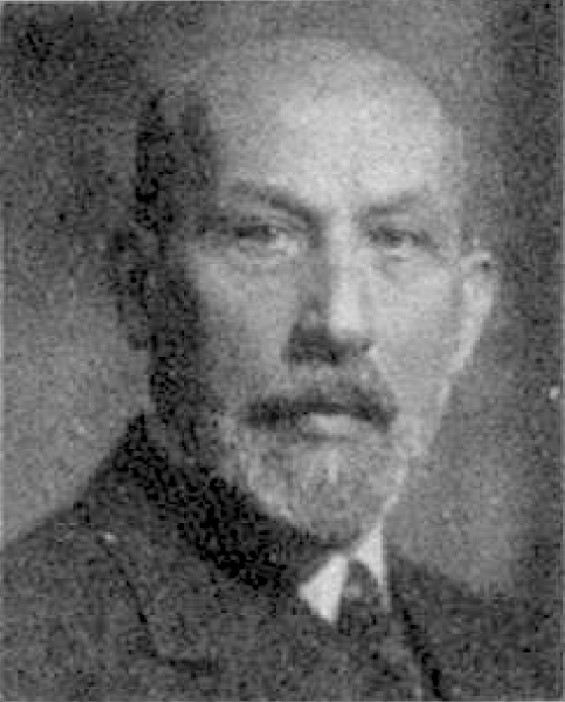
Hugo Bruckmann

Hugo Bruckmann (13 October 1863, in Munich – 3 September 1941, in Munich) was a German publisher. He became a supporter of Adolf Hitler and served as a Nazi Party deputy in the Reichstag from 1932 until his death.

== Biography ==
Bruckmann was the younger son of the publisher Friedrich Bruckmann. After his father's death in 1898 Hugo and his brother Alphons became the owners of F. Bruckmann KAG in Munich. Bruckmann and his wife Elsa Bruckmann were among the early and highly influential promoters of Adolf Hitler, and they helped him with gaining access to, and acceptance within, upper-class circles in Munich.

The Bruckmanns were from 1928 public promoters of the National Socialist Society for German Culture. As from 1930 Hugo Bruckmann was a board member of the Militant League for German Culture, founded by Alfred Rosenberg. The Bruckmanns joined the Nazi Party in 1932, but this was back-dated to 1925 with honorary membership numbers 91 (Elsa) and 92 (Hugo). In July 1932, he was elected as a deputy to the Reichstag from the Nazi Party electoral list. He continued to serve in the Reichstag until his death in 1941, switching to electoral constituency 26 (Franconia) at the November 1933 election and constituency 32 (Baden) at the April 1938 election.

After Oskar von Miller’s resignation in 1933, Bruckmann became a member of the board for the German museums. His personal influence on Hitler were to some extent to reduce the political interference within the cultural sphere. The attempt to ban Jewish books from libraries was successfully opposed by Bruckmann.

== Death ==
After the outbreak of World War II Bruckmann was, because of personal connections, able to have his publishing house declared of special importance for the war effort. After his death in 1941 he was honored with a state funeral.

== See also ==
Alfred Schuler
