= Eric Singer (graphologist) =

Eric Singer, LL.D. (Vienna) (1896-1969) was an Austrian poet and writer, as well as one of the foremost UK graphologists of the 20th century. He originally studied handwriting analysis and psychology in Austria and Switzerland under Ludwig Klages and went on to specialise in English handwriting. His research focussed on ego symbols and in particular the personal pronoun "I". He also taught graphology and his most notable student was Francis Hilliger who went on to found the British Institute of Graphologists (B.I.G.) After his death his wife and the B.I.G. felt his contribution to be so important that they republished a number of his works.
