= Ludwig Derleth =

German writer (1870–1948)

Ludwig Benjamin Derleth
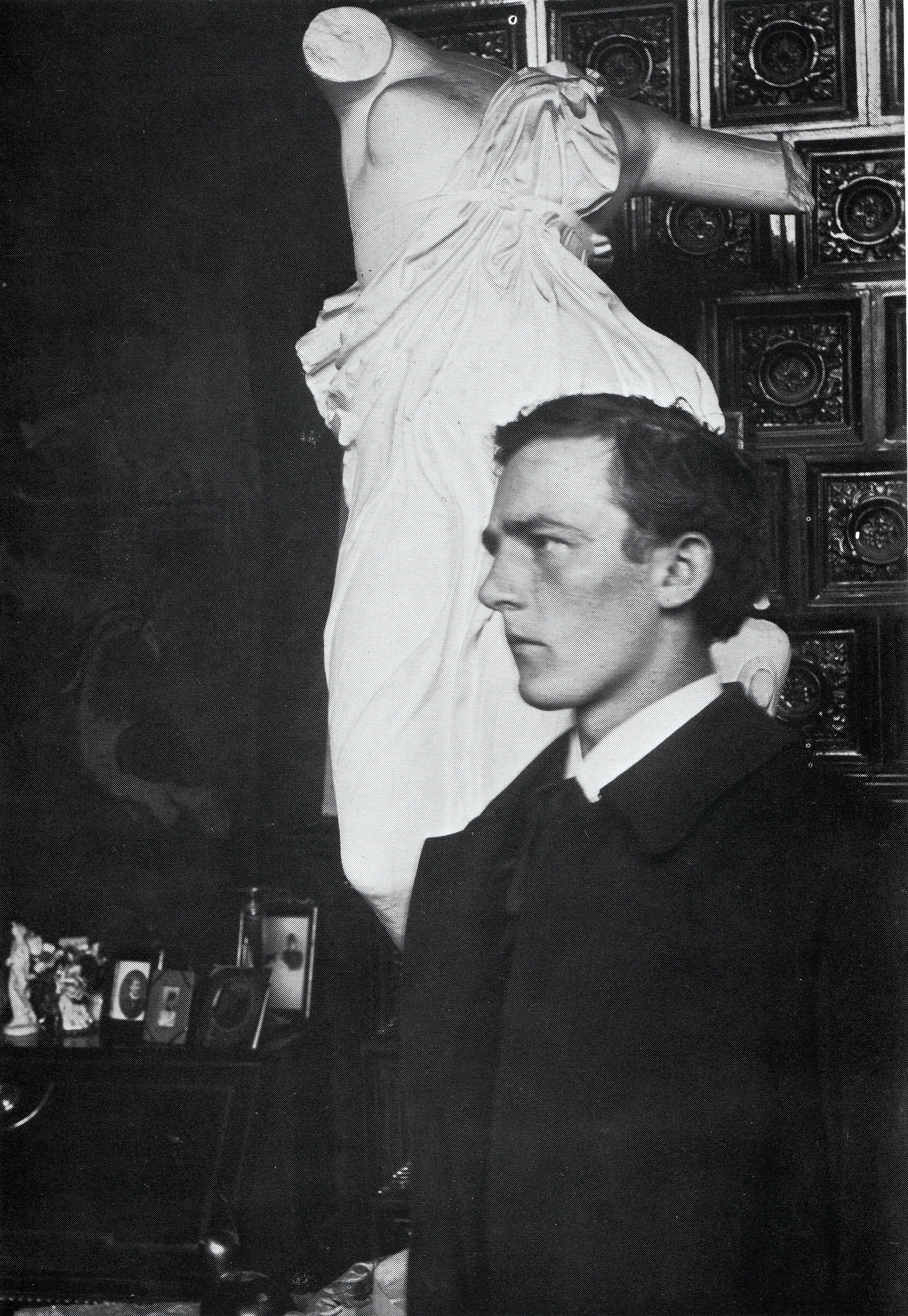
- Ludwig Derleth in Paris, 1900
- Born: November 3, 1870; Gerolzhofen, Schweinfurt, Kingdom of Bavaria
- Died: January 13, 1948 (aged 77); San Pietro di Stabio, Ticino, Switzerland

Ludwig Benjamin Derleth (3 November 1870 – 13 January 1948) was a German writer and poet, best known for his highly-stylized and anti-humanistic writings on spirituality and Christianity.

== Life ==
Derleth was born in 1870 in Gerolzhofen, Lower Franconia, Bavaria to Anna Maria (née Strobel) and Johann Derleth, at what is today Ludwig-Derleth-Strasse 4. He had a younger sister named Anna Maria (1874-1955), with whom he lived as a semi-recluse for his entire life. Ludwig Derleth spent his youth in Stadtprozelten, Bischofsheim, Münnerstadt, and Nuremberg.

After studying philosophy, psychiatry, and classics, Derleth worked as a Gymnasium-level teacher of ancient languages for twelve years.

In 1898 while visiting Paris, he met the symbolist poet Stefan George. While living in Munich, he became closer to George's entourage, as well as the Munich Cosmic Circle based around Alfred Schuler and Ludwig Klages, which broke up in 1904. Derleth was the subject of verses in two cyclical poems by George: his 1907 Der Siebenten Ring ("The Seventh Ring"), and his 1914 Der Stern des Bundes ("The Star of the Covenant").

Derleth came into contact with the sculptor Georg Kolbe in Paris, and the latter began a short-lived romantic relationship with Derleth's sister Anna-Maria. Kolbe sculpted a portrait bust of Derleth in 1904. During this period, he also travelled to Algeria, Budapest, Carthage, Iraq, Lebanon, Rhodes, and Syria.

In later years, Derleth made his living as a freelance writer in Rome, Basel, and Perchtoldsdorf (near Vienna). In Rome, on 15 March 1924, he married Christine Ulrich (born 1894 in Darmstadt), whom he had met in 1911. In 1935, he settled in neutral Ticino, Switzerland, where he died in 1948.

Surviving her husband, Derleth's widow Christine undertook the collection, organization, and (re)publication of most of his work. Derleth's archives are now held at the Deutsches Literaturarchiv Marbach. A school in his birthplace of Gerolzhofen, the Ludwig-Derleth-Realschule, is named in his honour.

== Work ==
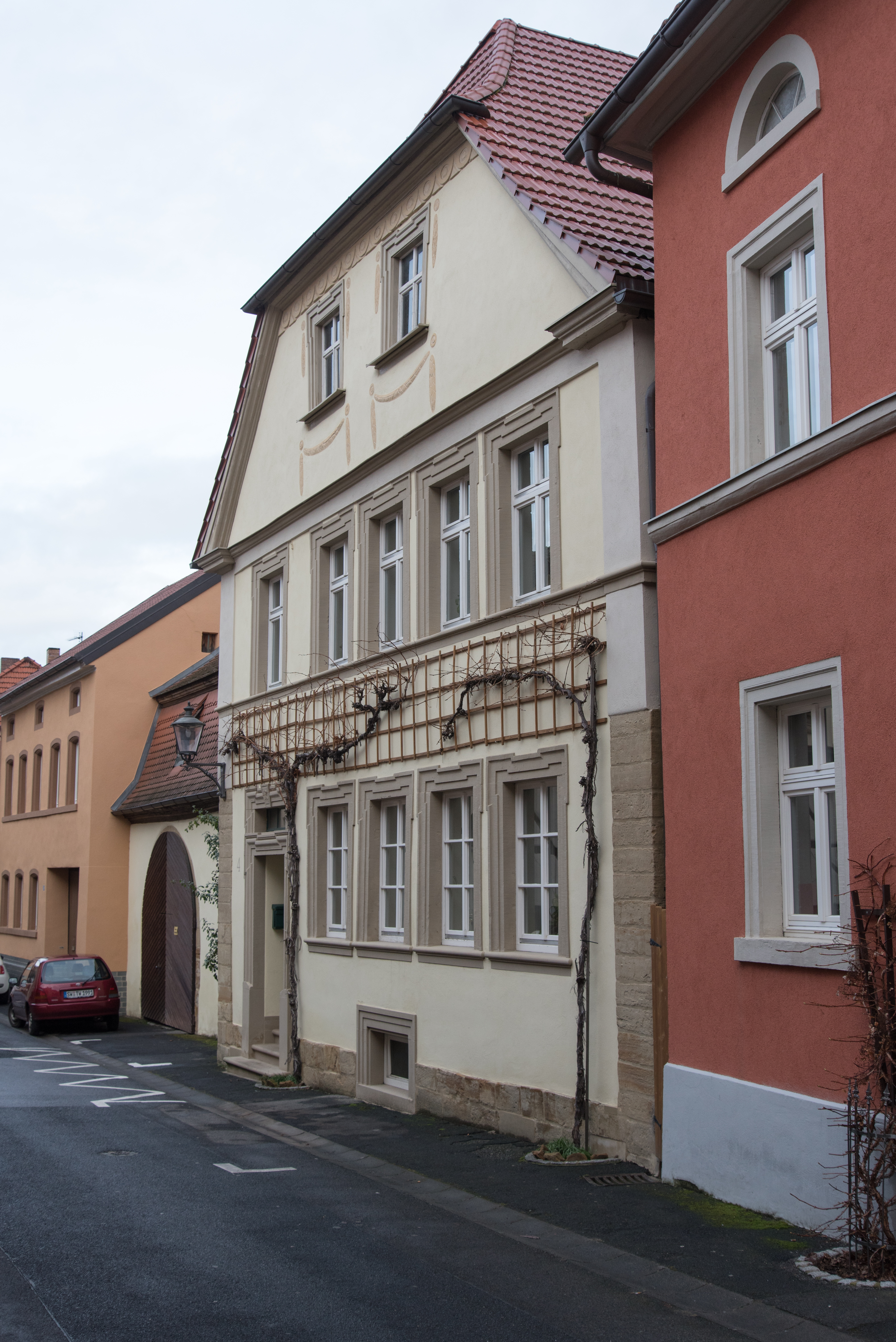
Ludwig Derleth's birthplace in Gerolzhofen, at Ludwig-Derleth-Straße 4.

From 1896 to 1910, Derleth published his first poems in the Berlin-based arts magazine Pan and in Stefan George's Blätter für die Kunst.

In 1904 he published his Proklamationen ("Proclamations") which called for a reformed and reorganized Catholicism based on a revolutionary, Nietzschean hierarchy and "purity". Much of Derleth's early work was anti-humanistic in tone, and advocated an almost-totalitarian vision of Christianity that was both idealistic and militant in character. An updated edition of Proklamationen was published in 1919. It is believed that fellow author Thomas Mann's interactions with Derleth during this period inspired his 1904 short story "Beim Propheten" ("At the Prophet's"), as well as characters in his novella Gladius Dei (1902) and Doktor Faustus (1947).

Proklamationen caused detractors and critics to occasionally label his work as "proto-Nazi" or fascistic, though he would distance himself from Nazism, living in Switzerland during the Third Reich. In Derleth's later poetry, he would meditate on themes of apocalyptic war, referring to Hitler as a "blindly raging destroyer of history's rule of peace / who attempted to fill the abyss with innumerable corpses" in Das Sybillinische Buch ("The Sibylline Book", written 1935-1940). He maintained friendships with Jewish peers like the playwright Lilith Bellenson.

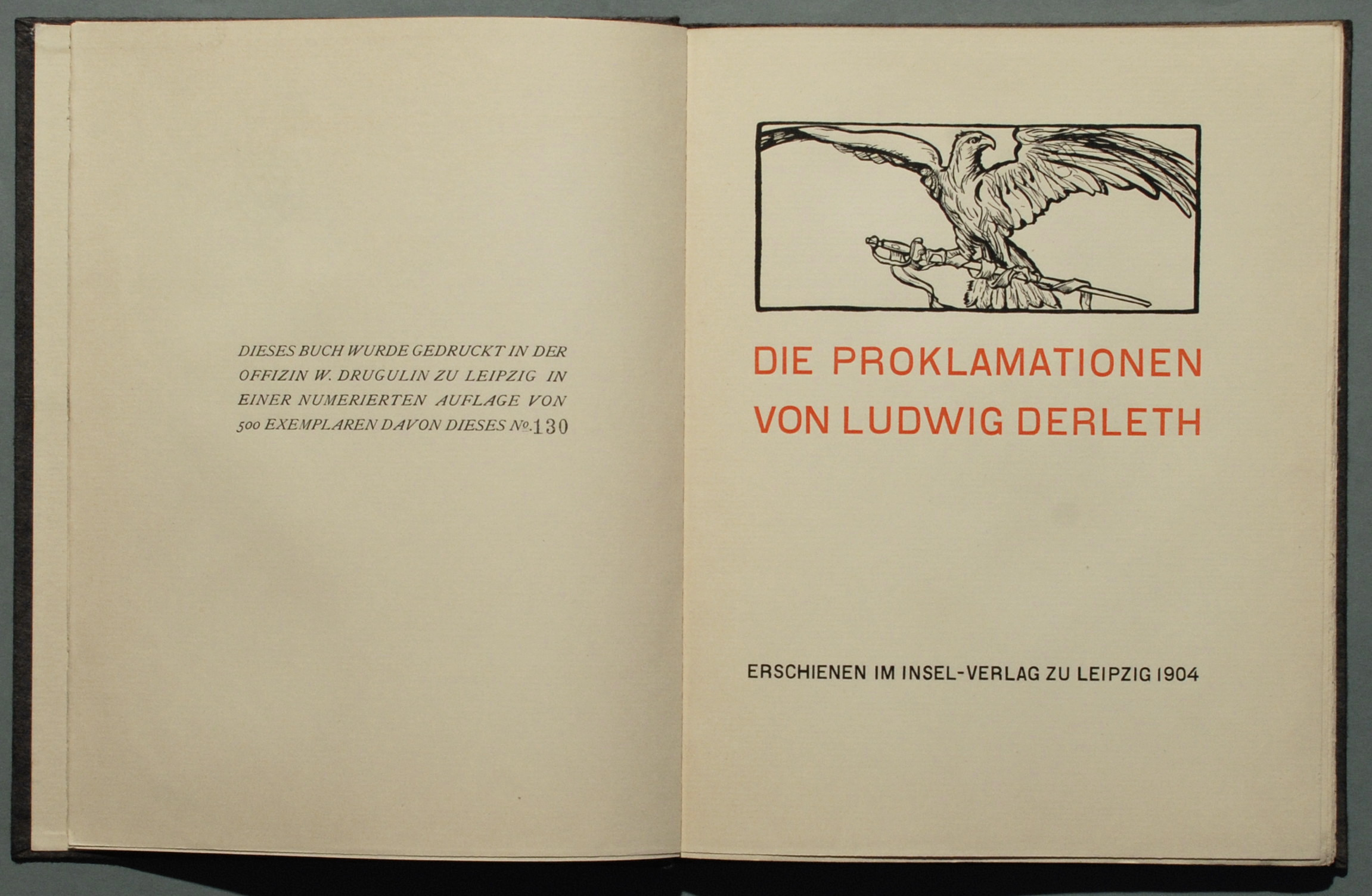
Thomas Mann describes the reading of Derleth's Proklamationen in Munich in 1904 in his story "At the Prophet's".

Recurrent themes in Derleth's later poetry include violence, mysticism and visions, nature, and androgyny. The latter theme, alongside Derleth's close friendships with several homosexual artists and writers (including Stefan George, André Germain, and the illustrator Alastair) have caused some biographers to attribute bisexual or homosexual characteristics to the poet.

Derleth spent 40 years completing his major work, Der fränkische Koran ("The Franconian Qur'an"), a multi-volume documentation of Derleth's own spiritual and religious journey. Comprising over 15,000 verses, the work combines Eastern and Western religious themes to outline Derleth's own worldview; the work also incorporates themes from Greco-Roman mythology, in what Derleth described as a "pilgrimage of the human soul from God to God".

Derleth's other works include Die Lebensalter ("The Ages [of Life]", 1937), Seraphinische Hochzeit ("Seraphinic Wedding", 1939), and Der Tod des Thanatos ("The Death of Thanatos", 1945). Seraphinische Hochzeit takes the form of parables about a monk named Bruder Immerwach (literally, "Brother Ever-wake") who experiences mystical visions; the work combines prose and rhyming poetry. Der Tod des Thanatos, completed towards the end of Derleth's life, is largely a meditation on sin, war, and violence incorporating Biblical themes.

His complete works were compiled and edited by his widow Christine and his biographer Dominik Jost, and were republished in seven volumes as Das Werk (1971).
