= Alfred Einhorn =

German chemist (1856–1917)

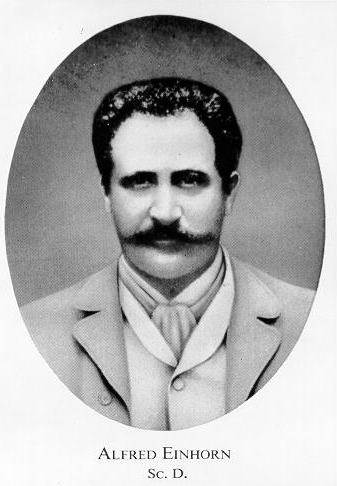
- Alfred Einhorn
- Born: 27 February 1856; Hamburg
- Died: 21 March 1917 (aged 61); Munich, German Empire
- Education: University of Tübingen
- Known for: Novocain
- Scientific career
- Workplaces: Ludwig-Maximilians-Universität München
- Doctoral students: Richard Willstätter; Ludwig Klages

Alfred Einhorn (27 February 1856, Hamburg, Germany – 21 March 1917, Munich, Germany) was a German chemist most notable for first synthesizing procaine in 1905 which he patented under the name Novocain. Until that time the primary anesthetic in use was cocaine, however its undesirable side effects (including toxicity and addiction) led scientists to seek out newer anesthetic drugs. Novocain was found to be comparatively safe and effective, although its anesthetic effects were weaker than cocaine and some patients proved highly allergic. However, none of the other anesthetics developed during this period proved more effective and Novocain quickly became the standard local anesthesia. Although its use has largely been replaced by lidocaine, it is still in use today, most frequently in dentistry.

== Life ==
Einhorn was born in Hamburg, and due to the death of his parents his education took place in Leipzig with his relatives. He studied chemistry at Leipzig University and later at the University of Tübingen where he received his Ph.D. for his work on ketones in 1878. He joined the group of Adolf von Baeyer at the Ludwig-Maximilians-Universität München in 1882, left two times for his habilitation to the University of Darmstadt and to the University of Aachen, but came back to the Ludwig-Maximilians-Universität München permanently in 1891. He was professor at the Ludwig-Maximilians-Universität München until his death in 1917.
