= Richard Willstätter =

German chemist (1872–1942)

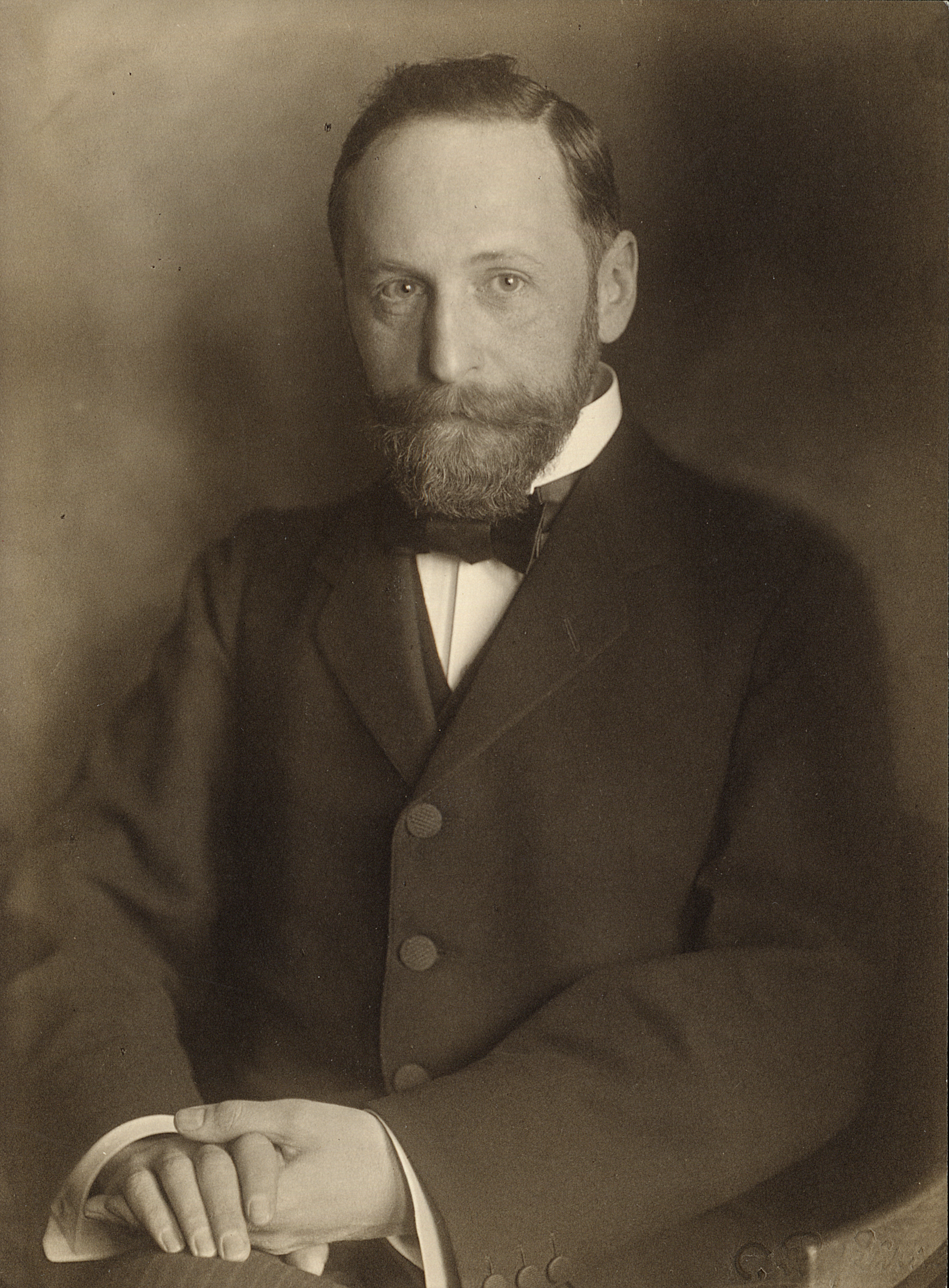
- Born: Richard Martin Willstätter; 13 August 1872; Karlsruhe, Grand Duchy of Baden, German Empire
- Died: 3 August 1942 (aged 69); Muralto, Locarno, Switzerland
- Education: Ludwig-Maximilians-Universität München
- Known for: Organic chemistry
- Spouse(s): Sophie Leser (1903–1908; her death; 2 children)
- Awards: Nobel Prize for Chemistry (1915); Faraday Lectureship Prize (1927); Davy Medal (1932); Willard Gibbs Award (1933); Fellow of the Royal Society
- Scientific career
- Fields: Physical chemistry
- Workplaces: Ludwig-Maximilians-Universität München; ETH Zurich; Friedrich Wilhelm University of Berlin; Kaiser Wilhelm Institute
- Doctoral advisor: Alfred Einhorn, Adolf von Baeyer
- Doctoral students: Jean Piccard

Richard Martin Willstätter FRS(For) HFRSE (German pronunciation: [ˈʁɪçaʁt ˈvɪlˌʃtɛtɐ], 13 August 1872 – 3 August 1942) was a German organic chemist whose study of the structure of plant pigments, chlorophyll included, won him the 1915 Nobel Prize for Chemistry.

== Life ==
Willstätter was born into a Jewish family in Karlsruhe. He was the son of Maxwell (Max) Willstätter, a textile merchant, and his wife, Sophie Ulmann.

He went to school at the Karlsruhe Gymnasium and, when his family moved to Nuremberg, he attended the Technical School there. At age 18, he entered the Ludwig-Maximilians-Universität München to study science and stayed for the next fifteen years. He was in the Department of Chemistry, first as a student of Alfred Einhorn—he received his doctorate in 1894 – then as a faculty member. His doctoral thesis was on the structure of cocaine. Willstätter continued his research into other alkaloids and synthesized several of them. In 1896, he was named Lecturer and in 1902 Professor extraordinarius (professor without a chair).

In 1905, he left the Ludwig-Maximilians-Universität München to become professor at ETH Zurich and there he worked on the plant pigment chlorophyll. He first determined its empirical formula.

In 1912, he became professor of chemistry at the Friedrich Wilhelm University of Berlin and director of the Kaiser Wilhelm Institute for Chemistry, studying the structure of pigments of flowers and fruits. It was here that Willstätter showed that chlorophyll was a mixture of two compounds, chlorophyll a and chlorophyll b. He lived in the Dahlem neighborhood near other scientists.

In 1915, his friend Fritz Haber asked him to join in the development of poison gases. Willstätter would not work on poisons but agreed to work on protection. He and his coworkers developed a three layer filter that absorbed all the enemy's gases. Thirty million were manufactured by 1917 and Willstätter was awarded the Iron Cross Second Class.

In 1916, he returned to the Ludwig-Maximilians-Universität München as the successor to his mentor Baeyer. During the 1920s, Willstätter investigated the mechanisms of enzyme reactions and did much to establish that enzymes are chemical substances, not biological organisms. However, to the end of his life he refused to accept that enzymes were proteins.

In 1934, Willstätter's career came to "a tragic end when, as a gesture against increasing antisemitism, he announced his retirement." According to his Nobel biography: "Expressions of confidence by the Faculty, by his students and by the Minister failed to shake the fifty-three-year-old scientist in his decision to resign. He lived on in retirement in Munich .... Dazzling offers both at home and abroad were alike rejected by him." His only research was with assistants who telephoned their results. Despite pleas for him to move to Jerusalem or to Switzerland earlier in the 1930s, Willstätter did not flee from Germany until 1939.

In 1933, the Centralverein (Central Union of German Citizens of the Jewish Faith) commissioned a book entitled Juden im deutschen Kulturbereich: ein Sammelwerk or 'Jews in the Realm of German Culture'. Amos Elon described it as a list of "Jewish 'achievements' and Jewish 'achievers,' which included Jewish luminaries in literature and the arts, in Jewish as well as Christian theology, in politics, warfare, industry, and the natural sciences ... a vast, meticulously detailed encyclopedia of Jewish contributions to German life and culture during the past two centuries." The oversized book ran to 1,060 pages and comprised thousands of entries and names. Willstätter wrote the introduction. However, not surprisingly, in December 1934 the (Nazi) Berlin State Police confiscated all the copies that had already been printed.

In 1939, Willstätter immigrated to Switzerland. He spent the last three years of his life there in Muralto near Locarno writing his autobiography. He died of a heart attack in 1942.

Willstätter's autobiography, Aus meinem Leben, was not published in German until 1949. It was translated into English as From My Life in 1965.

== Family ==
In 1903, he married Sophie Leser, who died in 1908. They had two children.

== Honours ==
In 1965, the school in Nuremberg he had attended named itself Willstätter-Gymnasium, in his honour.

== See also ==
- List of Jewish Nobel laureates
