= Karl Wolfskehl =

German Jewish writer

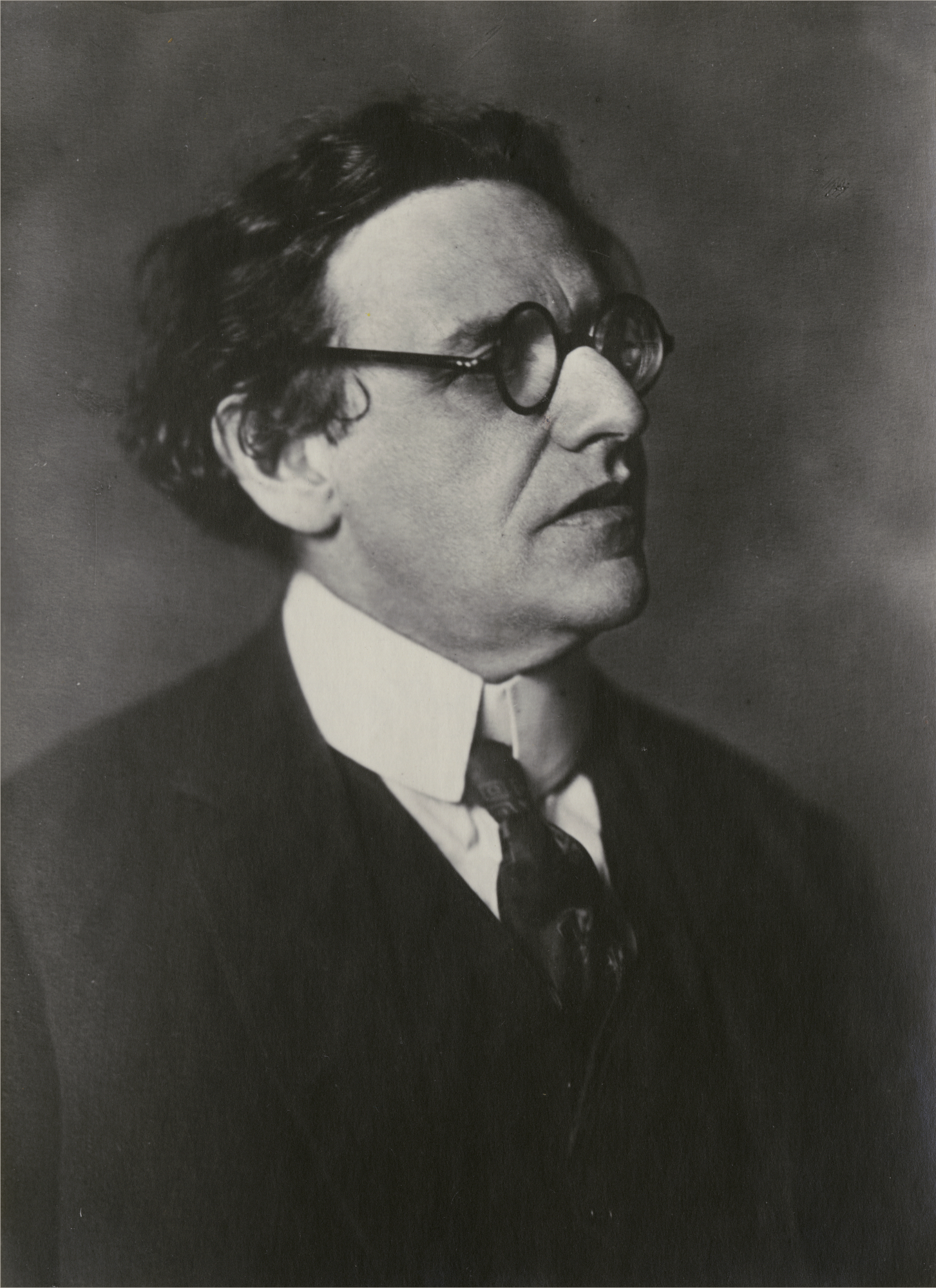
Karl Wolfskehl; photograph by Theodor Hilsdorf

Karl Wolfskehl (German: [ˈvɔlfskeːl]; 17 September 1869, Darmstadt – 30 June 1948 Auckland) was a German author and translator. He wrote poetry, prose and drama in German, and translated from French, English, Italian, Hebrew, Latin and Old/Middle High German into German.

== Biography ==
Wolfskehl's family had a long history in Germany. During the 10th century, one of his ancestors, a rabbi, had emigrated to Germany from Italy with the Holy Roman Emperor Otto II. Wolfskehl's ancestors then settled in Mainz, where they lived for the next thousand years.

Karl Wolfskehl was born in Darmstadt, Germany, the son of the banker and politician Otto Wolfskehl. He studied Germanic languages and philology and a range of humanities courses in Giessen, Leipzig and Berlin. Under Otto Behaghel, he gained a PhD with a dissertation on a topic in German mythology.

In 1898 he married Hanna de Haan (1878-1946), daughter of the Dutch conductor Willem de Haan at the Grand Ducal court theatre at Darmstadtf. They had two daughters, Judith (born 1899) and Renate (born 1901).

He defined himself by pride in his Jewish faith and heritage as well as in his roots in German literature and culture. He developed a lasting friendship with the poet Stefan George and was a leading figure in the poet's circle of friends and followers. With the philosopher Ludwig Klages and the archaeologist Alfred Schuler, Wolfskehl formed the short-lived so-called Munich Cosmic Circle around 1900. His family's wealth allowed Wolfskehl to pursue an independent career devoted to his literary, intellectual, and art related interests. Holding a jour fixe at his house, Wolfskehl became a central personality in the literary bohemia in Munich's borough of Schwabing during the last two decades of the German Empire.

Amongst his friends and associates were Rainer Maria Rilke, Thomas Mann, Wassily Kandinsky, Franz Marc, Paul Klee, Alfred Kubin and Martin Buber.

In 1915, Wolfskehl bought an estate at Kiechlinsbergen an der Kaiserstuhl, in the wine country of the Grand Duchy of Baden. He and his family moved there in 1919 after he had lost his family fortune due to the First World War and the ensuing inflation. He was forced to earn a living as a tutor in Italy and as an editor, cultural journalist and translator in Munich.

In 1933 appalled by Hitler's rise to power, Wolfskehl left Germany for Switzerland the day after the Reichstag fire. Following Stefan George's death on 3 December 1933, Wolfskehl and fellow Jewish member of the George-Kreis Ernst Morwitz were informed and attended the Master's funeral in Minusio, Switzerland.

Wolfskehl moved on to Italy in 1934. During his years as a refugee, Karl Wolfskehl became a central figure in the anti-Nazi literary movement with German literature known as Exilliteratur.

In defiance of what Peter Hoffmann calls the Nazi Party's "absurd efforts" to exclude him from the German people, Wolfskehl often said that wherever he was, there was the German Geist ("Spirit"). Also in 1934, Wolfskehl published a collection of poems titled, Die Stimme Spricht ("A Voice Speaks"), in which he affirmed his belief in Judaism and warned of the impending dangers posed by the Nazis. Some fellow members of the George-Kreis, however, feared that Wolfskehl's denunciations of Nazism might put every other member of the Circle in very real physical danger.

In 1938, due to the rapprochement between Nazi Germany and Fascist Italy, he moved to New Zealand with his partner Margot Ruben (1908–1980). There he became a staunch friend of the conductor Georg Tintner, also a refugee, from Nazi Austria. He was granted New Zealand citizenship after World War II and remained there until his death in 1948.

== Works (selection) ==
- Ulais. 1897.
- Gesammelte Dichtungen. 1903.
- Maskenzug. 1904.
- Saul. 1905.
- (with Friedrich von der Leyen) Älteste Deutsche Dichtungen. 1908 (translations).
- Sanctus. 1909.
- Gedichte des Archipoeta an Kaiser Friedrich Barbarossa und seinen Kanzler: nach Jakob Grimms Ausgabe. 1921 (translation).
- de Coster, Charles: Die Geschichte von Ulenspiegel und Lamme Goedzak und ihren heldenmäßigen, fröhlichen und glorreichen Abenteueren im Lande Flandern und anderwärts. München 1926 (translation).
- (with Curt Sigmar Gutkind) Das Buch vom Wein. 1927 (translations).
- Der Umkreis. 1927.
- Bild und Gesetz. Gesammelte Abhandlungen 1930.
- Die Stimme spricht. 1934/1936.
- An die Deutschen. 1947.

Posthumously published

- Hiob oder Die vier Spiegel. 1950.
- Sang aus dem Exil. 1950.
- Gesammelte Werke. 2 Vol. 1960.
- Briefwechsel aus Neuseeland 1938-1948. 2 Vol. Ed. C. Blasberg 1988.
- Briefwechsel aus Italien 1933–1938. Ed. C. Blasberg 1993.
- Von Menschen und Mächten. Stefan George, Karl und Hanna Wolfskehl. Der Briefwechsel 1892-1933. Ed. B. Wägenbaur and U. Oelmann, 2015
- Three Worlds / Drei Welten. Selected Poems. German and English. Transl. and ed. by A. P. Wood and F. Voit. 2016
- Poetry and Exile. Letters from New Zealand 1938-1948. Ed. and transl. By N. Wattie. 2017

== Sources ==
- Norman Franke, ‘Jüdisch, römisch, deutsch zugleich…’? Eine Untersuchung der literarischen Selbstkonstruktion Karl Wolfskehls unter besonderer Berücksichtigung seiner Exillyrik. Universitätsverlag Winter, Heidelberg 2006, ISBN 3-8253-5106-8 (German)
- Norman Franke, ’"Mirobuk!"Karl Wolfskehl als satirische Romangestalt'. In: Studia Niemcoznawcze, Studien zur Deutschkunde. (Vol. XXXI., Warsaw, 2005), pp. 339 - 360 (German)
- Norman Franke, 'The last European and the first New Zealander'. In: SPAN, Brisbane, Hamilton 1998/99, pp. 57 – 71
- Manfred Schlösser, Karl Wolfskehl 1869-1948. Leben und Werk in Dokumenten, Darmstadt: Agora Verlag, 1969 (German)
- Manfred Schlösser, Karl Wolfskehl – Bibliographie, Darmstadt: Erato-Presso (AGORA Verlag), 1971, ISBN 978-3-87008-021-1 (German)
- Elke-Vera Kotowski, Gert Mattenklott: "O dürft ich Stimme sein, das Volk zu rütteln!" Leben und Werk von Karl Wolfskehl Olms, Hildesheim 2007, ISBN 978-3-487-13303-4 (German)
- Friedrich Voit: Karl Wolfskehl. A Poet in Exile. Cold Hub Press, Lyttelton / Christchurch 2019, ISBN 978-0-473-47669-4
