= Munich Cosmic Circle =

German group of Intellectuals and writers

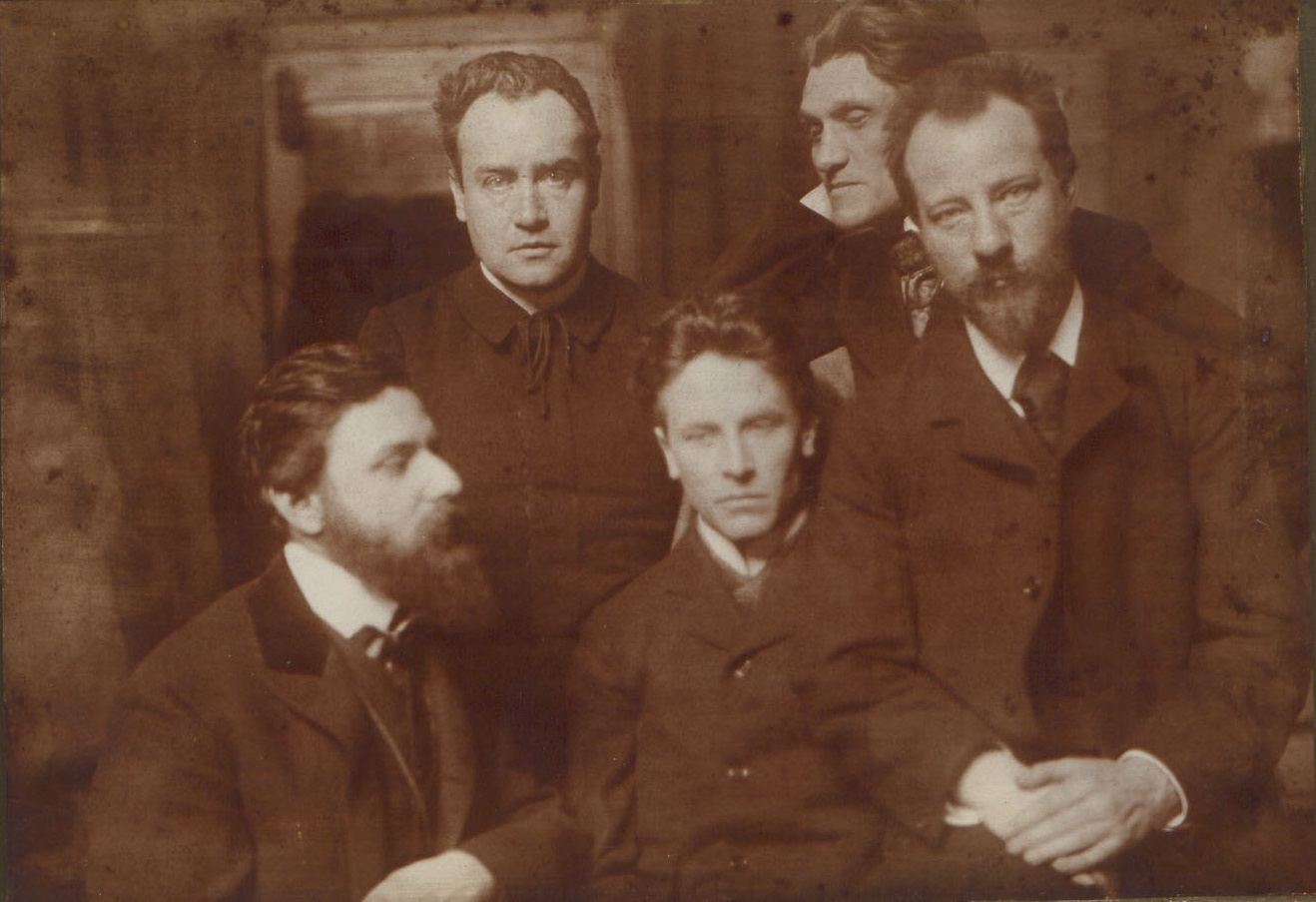
From left to right Karl Wolfskehl, Alfred Schuler, Ludwig Klages, Stefan George, and Albert Verwey. Photograph by Karl Bauer, 1902.

The Munich Cosmic Circle (German: Kosmikerkreis or Kosmiker for short) was a group of writers and intellectuals in Munich, Germany at the turn of the 20th century, founded by esotericist Alfred Schuler (1865–1923), philosopher Ludwig Klages (1872–1956), and poet Karl Wolfskehl (1869–1948). Other members of the group included writer Ludwig Derleth (1870–1948) and the "Bohemian Countess" of Schwabing, Fanny zu Reventlow (1871–1918). She wrote about her experiences with the group in her roman à clef Herrn Dames Aufzeichnungen (1913).

== History ==
Alfred Schuler and Ludwig Klages came to know each other in 1893. They based their early association upon an appreciation of Henrik Ibsen's dramas. Another interest was the work of Johann Jakob Bachofen (1815–1887), a Swiss anthropologist and sociologist, and his research into matriarchal clans. They developed a doctrine according to which the West was plagued by downfall and degeneration, caused by the rationalizing and demythologizing effects of Christianity. A way out of this desolate state could, according to the "Cosmic" view, only be found by a return to pagan origins. Schuler was described by Theodor Lessing as "an oddity, a curious mixture of charlatan and genius, a show-off and a visionary". The activities and rituals of the group were often sensationalized in bohemian fin-de-siècle Schwabing.

Some members of the Circle were also active in the group around the poet Stefan George, whom Wolfskehl introduced to the group. Ludwig Klages wrote a book praising his poetry in 1902. George was not a member of the Circle, though he was in close contact with them.

The group fell apart through an acrimonious dispute in 1904 between Klages, who considered himself a neo-pagan and against any form of organized religion, and the Zionist Wolfskehl, which led to charges of antisemitism against Klages. Stefan George had also begun to distance himself from Klages' philosophy at this time and defended Wolfskehl against Schuler and Klages.

In spite of the antisemitism prevalent in the group, the fascist Alfred Rosenberg, who was in Hitler's cabinet and later executed after being found guilty at the Nuremberg trials, would express hate for Klages. Similarly Julius Evola would denounce a book by Schuler as "politically dangerous", and stated that Klages' writings had a "jewish tone". The antisemitism of the Kosmikerkreis was of a peculiar kind, supportive of homosexuality and opposed to patriarchy.

The English writer D. H. Lawrence was influenced by the Lebensphilosophie of the group.
