= Alfred Schuler =

German poet (1865–1923)

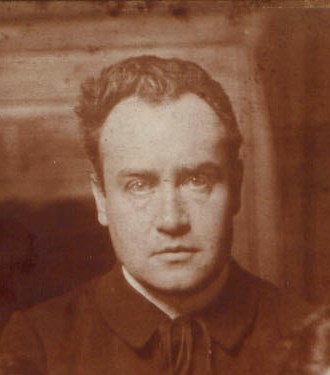
- Alfred Schuler in 1902

Personal life
- Born: 22 November 1865 Mainz, German Confederation
- Died: 8 April 1923 (aged 57) Munich, Weimar Germany
- Cause of death: Surgical complications during tumorectomy
- Main interest(s): Roman history, archaeology, classical philology, symbology
- Notable works: Dichtugen (1930); Nachlass (1940)
- Education: Ludwig-Maximilians-Universität München
- Occupation: Independent scholar, writer, poet

Religious life
- Religion: Neopaganism; Western esotericism
- Founder of: Munich Cosmic Circle
- Initiation: Blutleuchte

Senior posting
- Reincarnation: Roman citizen
- Influenced by: Gérard Encausse; Franz Hartmann; Carl Kiesewetter; Ludwig Klages; Eliphas Lévi; Johann Jakob Bachofen
- Influenced: Ludwig Derleth; Stefan George; Ludwig Klages; Karl Wolfskehl

Alfred Schuler (German: [ˈʃuːlɐ]; 22 November 1865 – 8 April 1923) was a German classicist, esotericist, ceremonial magician, mystagogue, writer, poet, and independent scholar. He was a co-founder and central esoteric figure of the Munich Cosmic Circle, a prominent group of Munich-based writers and intellectuals. Furthermore, he was a notable influence to poet Stefan George and philosopher Ludwig Klages, of whom he was a life-long friend, as well as other members of the Circle. The majority of his literary output was not published until after his death.

Schuler studied law and archaeology at the Ludwig-Maximilians-Universität München, and made his living as an independent scholar after his studies. Though devoid of political motives, Schuler's research into the historic significance of the swastika may have led to its appropriation by the Nazi movement. Schuler became highly critical of modern archaeology, seeing those in the discipline as "desecrators of graves ripping out of the earth what has been sanctified by the rite of burial, and confining to the unwholesome air of museums the lustrous force rightly working its mighty influence under the cover of darkness".

Schuler adopted the title ultimus paganorum (lit. 'the last pagan'), and was believed to be reincarnate of a Roman citizen of the late imperial era. He held his own "rebirth into an unpleasant epoch" to be the responsibility of an evil demon. Schuler died during an operation meant to remove a malignant tumour.

He was openly gay.

== Munich Cosmic Circle and Blutleuchte ==
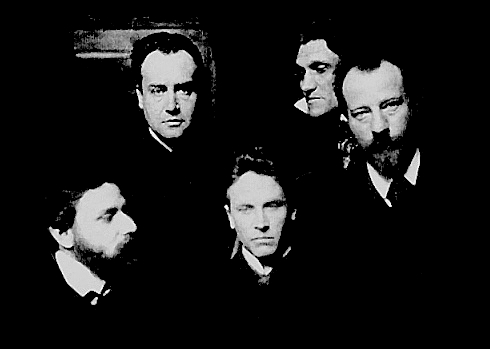
"Münchener Kosmiker": Wolfskehl, Schuler, Klages, George, Verwey. Photograph by Karl Bauer

At the end of the nineteenth century the Munich borough of Schwabing became the center of certain anti-bourgeois forces tending towards an interest in the occult, among which were found the secretive cult of the Blutleuchte ("Blood Beacon"). An occult circle (Munich Cosmic Circle) gravitating around Karl Wolfskehl, Alfred Schuler and Ludwig Klages developed a doctrine according to which the Occident was plagued by downfall and degeneration, caused by the rationalizing and demythologizing effects of Christianity, held to be responsible for the betrayal of life's primary forces. A way out of this desolate state could, according to the "Cosmic" view, only be found by a return to the pagan origins. No exact common ground did however exist, as to what this "homecoming" would entail.

Alfred Schuler and Ludwig Klages came to know each other in 1893, and both knew the so-called Bohemian Countess of Schwabing, Fanny zu Reventlow. They were, above all others, the leading personalities of the "Blutleuchte" and, with a few other 'initiates' such as Ludwig Derleth and the poet Karl Wolfskehl, the founders of this "occult circle". The first contact with Stefan George was established through Wolfskehl.

As clearly signalled by the name, "Blutleuchte", "Blood" and "Light" were to play an important role. With the historical "degeneration of the blood", held to be a sacred life elixir and a metaphysical substrate of souls, "truthful" life was seen as sinking into an ever more weakened state. And thus it was found to be necessary to lead this conception of the blood up to its former state of light and power, as it was thought to have been in heathen times thousands of years ago, and to some degree in antiquity. In the sign of the "Blood Beacon" and the swastika, its incarnate emblem, a healthy state of life were to be regained.

From a chosen few, among which they imagined themselves to be and in which the "untainted blood" was supposed to be still working its healthy influence, a reversal was thought to be possible. By the work of these chosen few, the "incarnation of the undying spark of a distant past" (L. Klages), the founding energies of the "cosmic solstice" were to be rekindled. The occult practices of the Blutleuchte was supposed to be a symbiosis of heathendom and "lordly leadership" in the service of a wayward humanity in need of a fundamental rebirth.

== Influence ==
The influence of the "Cosmic Circle" on Stefan George and his entourage is apparent by his use of the swastika in some of his publications, such as the Blätter für die Kunst. The "cosmic" influence can also be traced in the article "The Seventh Circle" and in his later work. As there was, however, in 1904, a rupture between George and the Schuler circle, its overt influence was intermittent.

From about the turn of the century, Schuler kept in touch with occultists such as Henri Papus, and later took part in spiritualist séances directed by Albert von Schrenck-Notzing. Schuler also held a large number of lectures on "ancient heathen mysteries"; and in the "salon" of Elsa Bruckmann a series of speeches (from 1915 to 1923) on the subject of "the eternal city". Rainer Maria Rilke is known to have been present during Schuler's speeches. Adolf Hitler was known to have attended some of Schuler's lectures there in 1922 and 1923.

The research into Schuler's life has been predominantly concerned with the memetic influence he may have exerted upon certain progenitors of German National Socialism, spurred by his anti-Judaism, his distinct employment of the swastika and, above all, by Robert Boehringer's thesis that Adolf Hitler may have met Schuler in the "salon Bruckmann". Despite his anti-Semitism, Schuler was, however, neither a National Socialist nor a member of any political party and it may seem likely that he would have found the active, public agitation of a politician to be a sacrilege against his gnostic beliefs. He is also known to have criticized the "nationalist tumour", and the "Hitler group" as representing the "drunken torchlight of death, leading people into the slaughterhouse".

In later years Schuler has become the subject of some interest as a poet in his own right and as a forerunner of certain experimental practices of modernist literature.

== Literary works ==
- Dichtungen. Aus dem Nachlass. K. Saucke, Hamburg, 1930. 28 pages. (in German).
- Fragmente und Vorträge aus dem Nachlass. Mit Einführung von Ludwig Klages. Leipzig, 1940. 150 pages. Full text at Schuler at the Internet Archive. (in German).
- Gesammelte Werke / Alfred Schuler; herausgegeben, kommentiert und eingeleitet von Baal Müller. [München: Telesma, 2007. 632 pages. ISBN 978-3-9810057-4-5 (in German)
