= Walter F. Otto =

German classical philologist (1874–1958)

- Born: 22 June 1874; Hechingen, German Empire
- Died: 23 September 1958 (aged 84); Tübingen, West Germany
- Occupation: Philologist
- Parent: Hermann Ernst Otto

Walter Friedrich Gustav Hermann Otto (22 June 1874, in Hechingen – 23 September 1958, in Tübingen) was a German classical philologist particularly known for his work on the meaning and legacy of Greek religion and mythology, especially as represented in his seminal 1929 work The Homeric Gods.

== Life ==
Walter F. Otto was born to pharmacist Hermann Ernst Otto in Hechingen (Baden-Württemberg), Germany in 1874. In 1882, after his family moved to Stuttgart, Otto began attending the Eberhard-Ludwigs-Gymnasium. Instead of completing the Abitur, he took the so-called Konkurs exam, the successful completion of which secured him admission to the Tübinger Stift.

As was expected of him by the Stift, Otto began studying Protestant theology, but switched to classical philology after two semesters, and continued his studies under professors Otto Crusius, Ludwig Schwabe and Wilhelm Schmid. Schmid convinced Otto to transfer from Tübingen to Bonn, where he completed his studies under Hermann Usener and Franz Bücheler. Bücheler, renowned for his work as a Latinist, influenced the young Otto to such a degree that the latter dedicated the bulk of the following 20 years to topics centred on Roman culture and literature - this, despite the fact that he is principally remembered as a Hellenist.

Otto graduated in 1897 with the thesis Nomina propria latina oriunda a participiis perfecti ("Latin Personal Names derived from the Perfect Participle"). Shortly thereafter, he acquired the license to teach in secondary schools. The following year, he became an assistant to the preparations of the Thesaurus Linguae Latinae and moved to Munich to carry out his new duties. He served in the positions of editor and author of the Onomasticum Latinum until 1911, by which time he had completed his doctoral work under Crusius. In the Fall of that year, Otto was offered and accepted a professorship at Vienna, where he met fellow philologist Hans von Arnim, and the two became close friends.

Two years later, in 1913, Otto transferred to Basel, where he took up the position of Ordinarius. The following year he transferred again, this time to the newly founded University of Frankfurt, where he remained for next 20 years as professor for classical philology. During this time, he developed a close friendship with Hellenist Karl Reinhardt.

In 1934, the Nazi regime forced Otto to accept the offer to serve as the successor to Paul Maas, who was removed from his position for being of Jewish descent, in Königsberg. From 1933 to 1945, Otto was a member - and from 1935, the administrator - of the "Scientific Committee" of the Nietzsche Archive. In 1939 and 1940, he, together with Karl Reinhardt and Ernesto Grassi, published a yearbook entitled Geistige Überlieferung ("Spiritual Tradition"). In the introduction, Otto expressed his concern regarding the destiny of the classical tradition, and the yearbook was subsequently banned by the government. He was able to flee Königsberg in 1944, but through the process lost all of his possessions, including his personal library and manuscripts. From that point until the end of the Second World War, Otto found refuge in Elmau near Garmisch-Partenkirchen in Bavaria, where he entertained the local community with lectures and small theatrical performances.

After the war, Otto was only able to secure positions as a substitute: 1945 in Munich, 1946 in Göttingen and, later, in Tübingen as visiting professor. After the reinstitution of the department in Tübingen, he was a member of the faculty of the university as professor emeritus. In Tübingen, Otto was able to settle in, and found good working conditions and students: at 83, he was still holding lectures and colloquia. He died there in the Fall of 1958 while working on the essay Die Bahn der Götter ("The Path of the Gods"). His remains were interred in the Tübingen Woodland Cemetery.

== Reception ==
In his work on Greek religion and mythology, especially in his studies The Homeric Gods (German: Die Götter Griechenlands; 1929) and Dionysos (1933), Otto emphasized the 'rational' aspects of classical mythology, and thus clearly distinguished his own position from that found in the more traditional school of Hermann Usener. In Otto's description, the faith of the ancient Greeks was a kind of "religion of objective realization" (Reinhardt). This explains the palpable and continuing influence Otto's writings have had, not only on classical philologists such as Karl Kerényi, but particularly on scholars from fields unrelated to philology. For the same reason, his works — particularly Theophania (1959) — have been misinterpreted and attacked by Christian theologians as an attempt to revive classical religion. Otto himself described such an interpretation as absurd.

== Bibliography ==
- Nomina propria latina oriunda a participiis perfecti (Dissertation), Bonn: Georgi, 1897 (auch erschienen als Supplement Band Nr. 24 (1898) der Jahrbücher für classische Philologie)
- Der Geist der Antike und die christliche Welt, Bonn, 1923.
- Die Manen oder Von den Urformen des Totenglaubens, Berlin, 1923 (2. Aufl. Darmstad, 1958; 3. Aufl. Darmstadt: Wissenschaftliche Buchgesellschaft, 1962; 1983).
- Kulturgeschichte d. Altertums. Überblick üb. neue Erscheinungen, München: Beck, 1925.
- Die altgriechische Gottesidee, Berlin, 1926.
- Binding, Rudolf G.; Otto, W. F. : Nähe der Antike / Zeit und Antike. Zwei Ansprachen, Frankfurt am Main: Englert und Schlosser, 1926.
- Die Götter Griechenlands. Das Bild des Göttlichen im Spiegel des griechischen Geistes, Bonn, 1929 (Frankfurt am Main, 2002 (9) ISBN 978-3-465-03173-4)
- Der europäische Geist und die Weisheit des Ostens, Frankfurt am Main, 1931.
- Dionysos. Mythos und Kultus, Frankfurt am Main, 1933 (6. Aufl., 1996 ISBN 978-3-465-02874-1).
- Der griechische Göttermythos bei Goethe und Hölderlin, Berlin, 1939.
- Grassi, Ernesto; Otto, W. F.; Reinhardt, K. (Hrsg.): Geistige Überlieferung, Berlin: Helmut Küpper, 1940 SS.
- Der Dichter und die alten Götter, Frankfurt am Main: Klostermann, 1942.
- Das Vorbild der Griechen, Tübingen/Stuttgart, 1949.
- Gesetz, Urbild und Mythos, Stuttgart, 1951.
- Die Musen und der Göttliche Ursprung des Singens und Sagens, Düsseldorf: Diederichs, 1954.
- Die Gestalt und das Sein. Gesammelte Abhandlungen über den Mythos und seine Bedeutung für die Menschheit, Düsseldorf: Diederichs, 1955.
- Theophania. Der Geist der altgriechischen Religion, Hamburg: Rowohlt, 1956 (2. Aufl. 1959; 3. Aufl. 1993 ISBN 978-3-465-02597-9).
- Mythos und Welt, Stuttgart: Klett, 1962.
- Das Wort der Antike, Stuttgart: Klett, 1962.
- Grassi, Ernesto (Hrsg.): Die Wirklichkeit der Götter. Von der Unzerstörbarkeit griechischer Weltsicht, Reinbek bei Hamburg: Rowohlt, 1963.
- Epikur, Stuttgart: Klett, 1975.
- Aufsätze zur römischen Religionsgeschichte, Meisenheim (am Glan): Hain, 1975.
