= Karl Bauer =

German painter, graphic artist (1868–1942)

Karl Konrad Friedrich Bauer (1868–1942) was a German artist, print-maker and poet. Bauer's traditional skills in draftsmanship made him a popular illustrator and portrait artist in the early 20th century. In his later life he made a number of portraits of Nazi leaders. His poetry was admired and promoted by Stefan George.

== Life ==
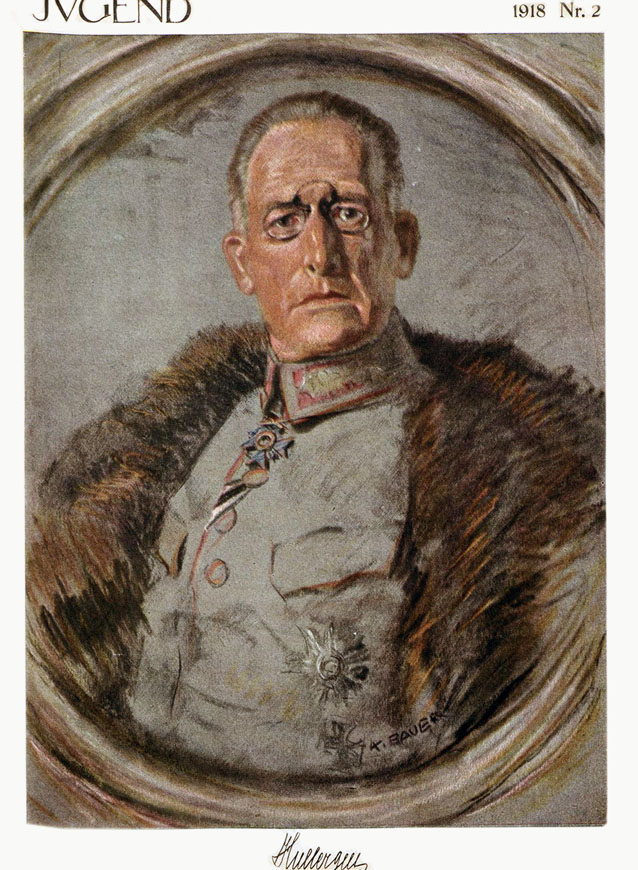
A portrait by Bauer of General Hugo von Huller, on the cover of Jugend in 1918

Born on 7 July 1868, Bauer spent his childhood and youth in Stuttgart. He studied at the Academy of Fine Arts, Munich under Wilhelm von Lindenschmit. During his studies Bauer traveled frequently to Italy and France. He financed himself by teaching drawing to the children of wealthy families and making portraits. In 1891, while he was in Venice, he met Stefan George, of whom he painted a portrait and to whom he showed his poetry. George was impressed both by Bauer's draughtsmanship and his poems, publishing several of them in Blättern für die Kunst and invited Bauer to join his circle in Munich. In 1893 he studied in Paris.

He was back in Munich in the autumn of 1895, when George acquainted him with the young poet Karl Gustav Vollmoeller, for whom he created illustrations. His graphic work includes mainly lithographs, pen-and-ink drawings and etchings. After 1896, he settled in Munich, where he worked as illustrator including a notable edition of Heinrich Heine's Buch der Lieder. In 1927 he participated in the Munich art exhibition.

In 1930 he moved from Munich back to Stuttgart, living above the town in Sillenbuch. In the Nazi era, Bauer's traditionalist style was acceptable to the regime, and his career continued to be successful. In 1938 he was awarded the Goethe Medal for Art and Science. On 6 May 1942, he died during a visit to Munich.

== Work ==
In addition to poetry, Bauer was a prolific writer on history, literature and religion.

As a painter, he specialized in portraits, drawing in a detailed linear style influenced by Renaissance German masters such as Dürer. He created portraits in the Northern Renaissance style depicting Martin Luther for churches in Görlitz, Oppenweiler and Helsinki. He also made numerous portraits of other German historical figures, including Goethe, Schiller and Beethoven.

In World War I he published a book of portrait illustrations entitled Führer und Helden (Leaders and Heroes), depicting military celebrities. During the Nazi period, he made several portraits of Adolf Hitler. He also depicted Joseph Goebbels, Hermann Göring, and other leaders. A collection of his drawings illustrated deceased Nazi heroes such as Dietrich Eckart, Albert Leo Schlageter and Horst Wessel.
