= Ludwig Klages =

German psychologist and philosopher (1872–1956)

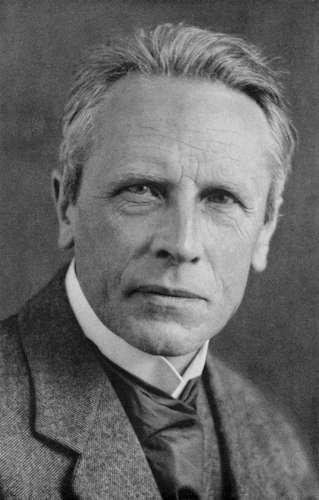
- Born: 10 December 1872; Hannover, Prussia, German Empire
- Died: 29 July 1956 (aged 83); Kilchberg, Zurich, Switzerland
- Awards: Goethe Medal for Art and Science (1932)

Education
- Education: Leipzig University; Technische Hochschule Hannover; Ludwig-Maximilians-Universität München

Philosophical work
- Era: 20th-century philosophy
- Region: Western philosophy
- School: Continental philosophy; Anti-foundationalism; Anti-militarism; Biocentrism; Lebensphilosophie; Perspectivism
- Main interests: Aesthetics, anthropology, classical studies, eroticism, handwriting, intellectual history, metaphysics, philosophy of history, philosophy of language, philosophy of mind, poetry, psychology
- Notable ideas: Ausdruckspsychologie; Biocentric ethics; Criticism of logocentrism; Id; Seele–Geist dialectic
- Co-founder of: Munich Cosmic Circle
- Scientific career
- Fields: Theoretical psychology, characterology, chemistry
- Workplaces: Ludwig-Maximilians-Universität München: Chemisches Institut (from 1893) and Psychodiagnostisches Seminar (1905–1914)
- Thesis: Attempt at a Synthesis of Menthone (1901)
- Doctoral advisor: Alfred Einhorn
- Other academic advisors: Theodore Lipps

Friedrich Konrad Eduard Wilhelm Ludwig Klages (German: [ˈklaːɡəs]; 10 December 1872 – 29 July 1956) was a German philosopher, psychologist, graphologist, poet, writer, and lecturer, who was a two-time nominee for the Nobel Prize in Literature. In the Germanosphere, he is considered one of the most important thinkers of the 20th century. He began his career as a research chemist according to his family's wishes, though soon returned to his passions for poetry, philosophy and classical studies. He held a post at the Ludwig-Maximilians-Universität München, where in 1905 he founded the Psychodiagnostisches Seminar; the latter was forced to close in 1914 with the outbreak of World War I. In 1915, Klages moved to neutral Switzerland, where over the following decades much of his mature philosophical works were written. Klages died in 1956.

Klages was a central figure of characterological psychology and the Lebensphilosophie school of thought. Prominent elements of his philosophy include: the opposition between life-affirming Seele and life-denying Geist; reality as the ongoing creation and interpretation of sensory images, rather than feelings; a biocentric ethics in response to modern ecological issues and militarism; an affirmation of eroticism in critique of both Christian patriarchy and the notion of the "sexual"; a theory of psychology focused on expression, including handwriting analysis; and a science of character aimed at reconciling the human ego to the divide it effectuates between living beings. Central to Klages's thought is a linguistic opposition to logocentrism, a term introduced by Klages to diagnose a fixation on language or words to the detriment of the things to which they refer. His formulation of this concept came to be of significant importance to semiotic studies of Western science and philosophy, namely within Derridean deconstruction. Klages is similarly seen as a forebear to critical theory, deep ecology, and existential phenomenology.

Klages's place in modern psychology has been likened to those of his contemporaries Sigmund Freud and Carl Jung. His philosophy was roundly attacked by Nazi leaders during the height of his career, though his proximity has since fallen to dispute. Though little of his literary output has historically been available in English, Klages's thought has exhibited sweeping influence on German developments in psychology, psychiatry, literature, and various other disciplines.

== Biography ==
=== Early life ===
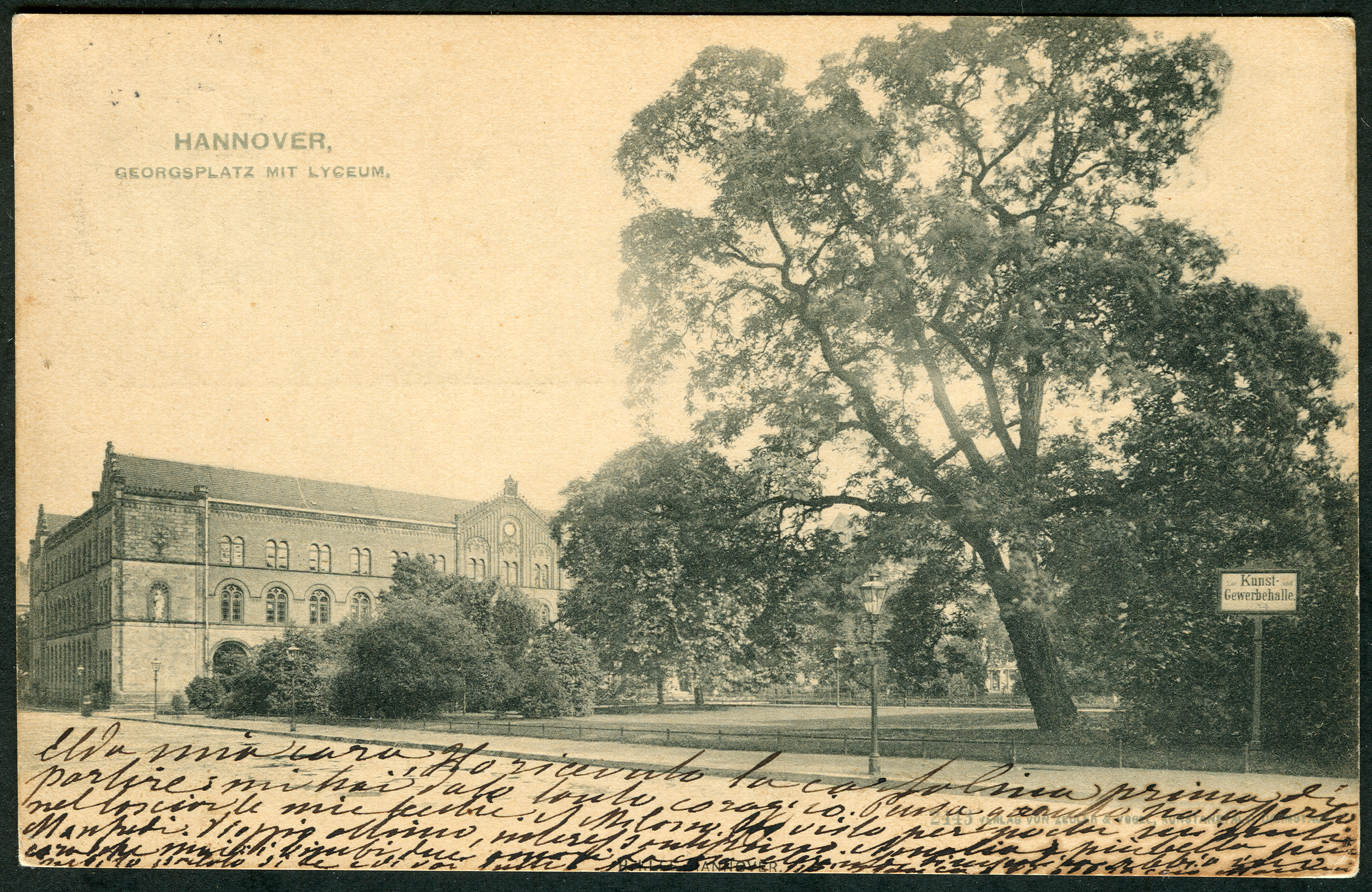
The Lyceum am Georgsplatz (c. 1900)

Klages was born on 10 December 1872, in Hannover, Germany, the son of Friedrich Ferdinand Louis Klages, a businessman and former military officer, and wife Marie Helene née Kolster. In 1878, his sister Helene Klages was born and the two shared a strong bond throughout their lives. In 1882, when Klages was nine years old, his mother died. The death is thought to have been the result of pneumonia. Klages had begun attending school at the Lyceum am Georgsplatz (later called the Kaiser-Wilhelm-und-Ratsgymnasium) in Hannover, when his aunt, Ida Kolster, soon came to live with them to help raise the children, in keeping with the dying mother's request. Klages's early education was marked by a traditional emphasis on the classics and humanities. He quickly developed a strong interest in both prose and poetry writing, as well as in Greek and Germanic antiquity. His relationship with his father was strained by the latter's strictness and will to discipline him. Nevertheless, attempts to forbid Klages from writing poetry were unsuccessful by both his teachers and parents.

Klages developed an intense childhood friendship with classmate Theodor Lessing, with whom he shared many passionate interests. Klages fought to maintain their friendship in spite of his father's antisemitism. According to Lessing, "Ludwig's father did not view his son's fraternization with 'Juden' as acceptable." In 1891, Klages completed his Abitur-level schooling and continued to Leipzig University, where he began his studies in physics and chemistry. His father had instructed him to pursue a career in industrial chemistry. He took two semesters at Leipzig, during 1891–1892, then one semester at the Technische Hochschule Hannover (now the University of Hannover), during 1892–1893.

=== Munich career ===
Klages moved to Munich in 1893, continuing his undergraduate studies at the Ludwig-Maximilians-Universität München. The same year, he joined the Chemisches Institut, a laboratory founded at the university by Adolf von Baeyer in 1875. Alongside his studies, he engaged in the cultural scene in Schwabing, the Bohemian district of Munich. In 1894, Klages met poet and sculptor Hans Busse, who had recently founded the Institut für wissenschaftliche Graphologie (Institute for Scientific Graphology). Handwriting analysis, or graphology, was at that time a more reputable discipline than now; Busse was sought on occasion to give expert testimony in court cases, and his passion for the subject drew Klages to him. Others figures who entered Klages life at this time include psychiatrist Georg Meyer, poet Stefan George, classicist Alfred Schuler, and novelist Franziska zu Reventlow.

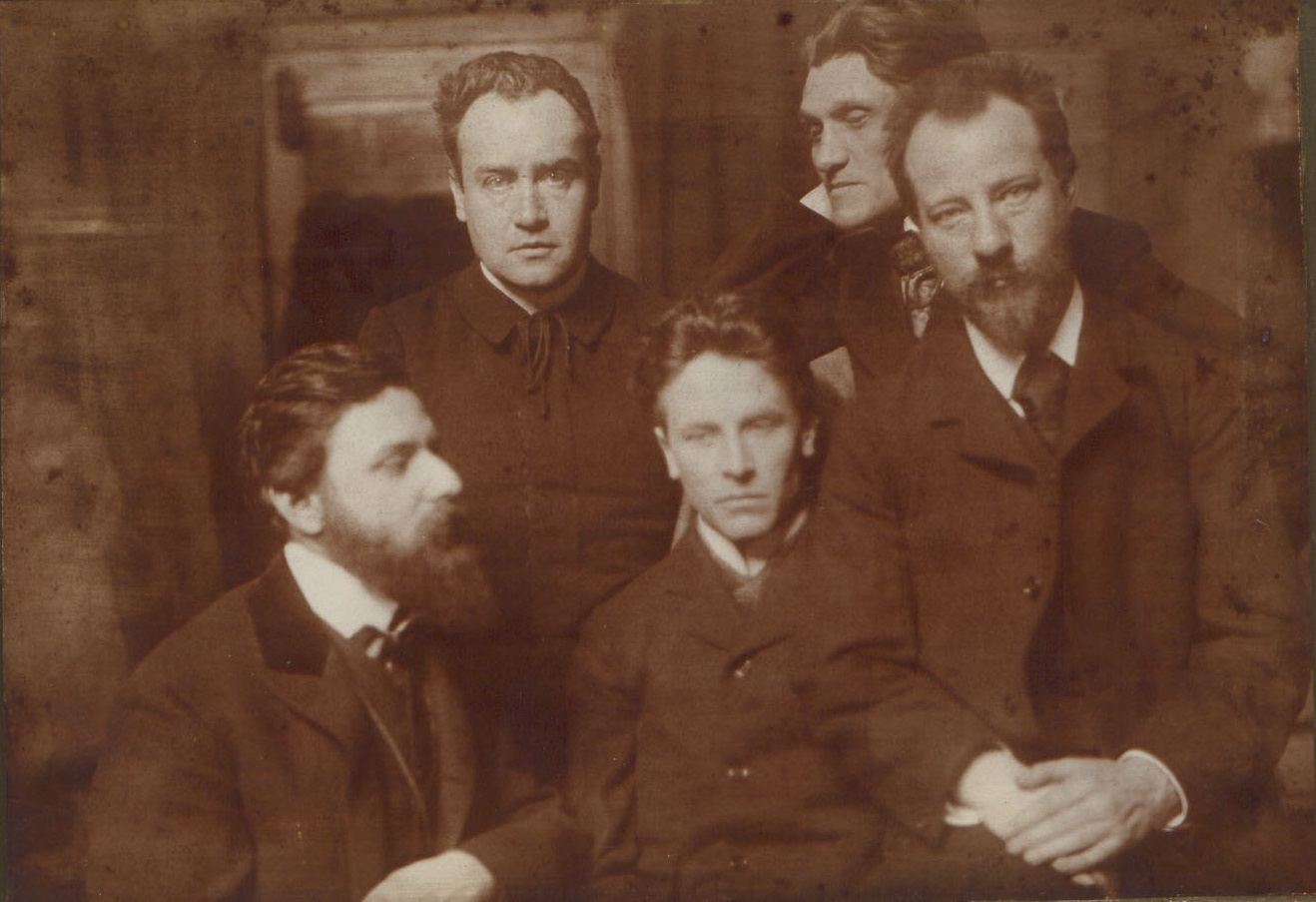
Members of the Munich Cosmic Circle, from left to right: Karl Wolfskehl, Alfred Schuler, Ludwig Klages, Stefan George, Albert Verwey (1902, photo by Karl Bauer)

After graduating, Klages continued his work as a research chemist and began preparing his doctoral thesis under Alfred Einhorn. Klages's writings in both prose and poetry began appearing in Blätter für die Kunst, a journal publication owned by Stefan George, who himself had eagerly recognized Klages's talent. In 1896, Klages, Meyer, and Busse founded a new graphological institution, the Deutsche Graphologische Gesellschaft (German Graphological Society). Klages's childhood friendship with Theodor Lessing came to a bitter end in 1899. Both would later write about the depth of their relationship and influence on each other—though many aspects, such as the effect race had on their friendship, remain unclear.

In 1900, Klages received his doctorate in chemistry from the Ludwig-Maximilians-Universität München; since chemistry had seven years earlier moved from the medical faculty, Klages received his qualification as a philosophy doctorate (PhD) rather than a medical doctorate (MD). Klage published his thesis Attempt at a Synthesis of Menthone in 1901.

=== Switzerland career ===
In 1914 at the outbreak of war Klages moved to Switzerland and supported himself with his writing and income from lectures. He returned to Germany in the 1920s and in 1932 was awarded the Goethe medal for Art and Science. However, by 1936 he was under attack from Nazi authorities for lack of support and on his 70th birthday in 1942 was denounced by many newspapers in Germany. After the war he was honoured by the new government, particularly on his 80th birthday in 1952.

== Thought ==
Klages's thought is often seen as the link between Friedrich Nietzsche and much of contemporary continental philosophy, with even Klages once regarding his as "the most plundered" body of work of the present age. Jürgen Habermas, who regarded Klages as well ahead of his time, describes his philosophy as "anti-spiritual" (German: geistfeindlichen). In this regard, Klages is also seen as a pioneering figure of critique against the Hegelian notion of spirit as adverse to the affirmation of life.

Much of Klages's work makes noted use of highly precise philosophical German language as well as occasional esoteric terminology.

He created a complete theory of graphology and will be long associated with the concepts of form level, rhythm and bi-polar interpretation. Together with Friedrich Nietzsche and Henri Bergson he anticipated existential phenomenology. He also coined the term logocentrism in the 1920s.

As a philosopher, Klages took the Nietzschean premises of Lebensphilosophie "to their most extreme conclusions." He drew a distinction between life-affirming Seele (soul) and life-destroying Geist (spirit or intellect). Geist represented the forces of "modern, industrial, and intellectual rationalization", while Seele represented the possibility of overcoming "alienated intellectuality in favor of a new-found earthly rootedness." After his death, the German philosopher Jürgen Habermas urged that Klages's developments in the fields of anthropology and philosophy of language should not be left veiled behind his enigmatic metaphysics and apocalyptic philosophy of history. Habermas characterized Klages's thought in this regard as ahead of its time.

Klages influence was widespread and amongst his great admirers were contemporaries like Jewish thinker Walter Benjamin, philosopher Ernst Cassirer, philologist Walter F. Otto and novelist Hermann Hesse. The novelist Robert Musil satirised Klages as the character Meingast in The Man Without Qualities. Although the portrayal is a parody, influences from Klages's theories can be found throughout the novel's treatment of image and eros.

== Personal life ==
=== Relationships and sexuality ===
In uniting his philosophy and personal preferences, Klages generally opposed sexuality as a formal concept. Even during the heyday of sexual and bohemian rebellion, Herf writes, "Klages struck most observers as strikingly clean and honourable in erotic matters."

When Klages moved into a new Schwabing flat in 1895, he entered into an intense sexual relationship with his landlady's daughter, with the mother's approval; the daughter, whom Klages called 'Putti', was 12 years old, and their relationship continued for almost two decades. During his years in Schwabing, Klages also became romantically involved with novelist Franziska zu Reventlow, which was further alluded to in her 1913 roman à clef Herrn Dames Aufzeichnungen. Both Stefan George and Alfred Schuler, with whom Klages closely associated, were openly homosexual men. Whilst some of Klages's outward statements on homosexuality may be seen as harsh, he maintained an intimate personal and academic admiration for Schuler all throughout his life.

=== Religion and political views ===
Klages, like Friedrich Nietzsche, was critical of Christianity as well as what they both saw as its roots in Judaism. Some of his earlier statements on Judaism in this regard may be seen as only veiled attacks on Christianity, drawing further similarities to Nietzsche and Voltaire. "On one level, it is possible to see in Klages a call for a return to polytheism or pantheism, inasmuch [as] there are significant affinities between his outlook and the cosmogony of the ancient Greeks, who saw each individual part of the world in pantheist and pagan terms", writes contemporary scholar Paul C. Bishop; he concludes however, that Klages's religious views in this regard "must remain an open question". Other sources, such as by Josephson-Storm, have more overtly regarded Klages as a neo-pagan.

Klages has largely been identified as apolitical, with resemblances to deep ecology in his bioethical stance, feminism in his rejection of Christian patriarchy, and pacifism in his staunch anti-war position on German involvement in World Wars I and II. Despite his opposition to fascist militarism, among the most common charges against Klages is the misconception that he sympathised with Nazism. Attempts have been made to dismiss Klages on these grounds for his inclusion of antisemitic remarks, while under the rule of the Third Reich, in the foreword to a 1940 publication of the late Alfred Schuler's Nachlass. Klages is also sometimes placed among thinkers of the Conservative Revolution. Klages was however, as Bishop states, "not a fundamentally anti-semitic thinker, not a right-wing philosopher, and not a Nazi." Earlier publishings by scholars Lebovic, Stauth, and Turner regard Klages as antisemitic. Likewise, historian Josephson-Storm states "As an American Jew who lost extended family in the Shoah, I personally find this the most disgusting and odious part of Klages's oeuvre." Bishop further states that such views on Klages can be traced back to polemical interpretations forwarded by Jewish thinkers Ernst Bloch and Georg Lukács, and later embraced by the European New Right. Addressing the issue of antisemitism, Klages wrote:

I have never endorsed the claim that the Nazi big-wigs belonged to a superior race. However, I must also add that I have consistently refused to accept the claim of another such race as the chosen people. The arrogance is identical in both cases, but with this important distinction: after waging war against mankind for more than three thousand years, Judaism has finally achieved total victory over all nations of the earth.

== Works ==
Klages wrote 14 books and 60 articles between 1910 and 1948, and co-edited the journal Berichte (1897–1898) and its successor Graphologische Monatshefte until 1908.

=== Translated works in English ===
- — (2022) [1921]. On the Nature of Consciousness [Vom Wesen des Bewusstseins] (translated from the 1st ed.). Independently Published. ISBN 979-8500264039.
- — (2019) [1922]. Of Cosmogonic Eros [Vom kosmogonischen Eros]. Translated by Kuhn, Mav. Theion Publishing. ISBN 978-3-9820-6540-3.
- — (1926). The Science of Character [Grundlagen der Charakterkunde]. Translated by Johnston, Walter H. (translated from the 5th & 6th ed.). London: Unwin Brothers (published 2018).
- — (n.d.). The Biocentric Worldview: Selected Essays and Aphorisms. Translated by Pryce, Joseph D. Arktos Media (published 2013). ISBN 978-1-9071-6661-7.
- — (n.d.). Cosmogonic Reflections: Selected Aphorisms. Translated by Pryce, Joseph D. Arktos Media (published 2015). ISBN 978-1-9105-2441-1.

=== Selected works in German ===
- Vom Wesen des Bewusstseins (1921)
- Vom kosmogonischen Eros (1922)
- Die Grundlagen der Charakterkunde (1926)
- Der Geist als Widersacher der Seele (1929–32)
