= Adios Miguel =

Compilation album by Menudo & Miguel Cancel
- Released: 1983
- Recorded: 1981–1983
- Genre: Latin pop
- Length: 37:03
- Label: Padosa, Inc. (in Puerto Rico, Dominican Republic, Virgin Islands, Haiti and Mexico); RCA Victor (in Central America, Caribbean, United States, Canada and South America).
- Producer: Edgardo Diaz

Menudo & Miguel Cancel chronology
Una aventura llamada Menudo (1982)	Adios Miguel (1983)	Feliz Navidad (1983)

Adiós Miguel is a compilation album by the Puerto Rican boy band Menudo, released by the Padosa record label in 1983. The album includes songs featuring former member Miguel Cancel as the main vocalist. In the band's discography, it was common for each song to have one member as the lead vocalist, while others were sung by the entire group.

== Background ==
Miguel Cancel joined the group in 1981, during the release of the album Fuego, and the lineup at that time included brothers Oscar and Ricky Meléndez, René Farrait, Johnny Lozada, and Xavier Serbiá. Miguel replaced Oscar, who reached the age limit of 15 years. During his career as part of the quintet, he recorded the studio albums: Quiero Ser (1981), Por Amor (1982), Una Aventura Llamada Menudo (1982), and Xanadu (1981), which featured the group's hit songs re-recorded by the current members of the time, as well as some new tracks.

The tracklist for Adiós Miguel includes hit songs like "Rock en la TV," "A Volar," "Quiero Rock," and three original tracks that were never released on any other album. The title of the album reflects Miguel's voluntary departure from the group before the expected time. There is no fixed lineup for this album, but it features all the members who were part of Menudo's "golden era" from 1981 to 1983.

Miguel Cancel is the only member of Menudo to have a farewell album dedicated to him, although tribute albums were also released for Fernando Sallaberry and his bandmates Xavier Serbia, Johnny Lozada, and Ray Reyes.

== Commercial performance ==
Commercially, the album was well received in the United States, where it appeared on the Billboard magazine's chart for Latin music albums.

The record label strategically released the album, capitalizing on the extensive media coverage surrounding Miguel's departure. In this context, the label took the opportunity to release three additional Menudo albums during the same period in 1983. Together, the four albums achieved an impressive milestone, selling 750,000 copies in just three days.

== Tracklist ==
No.	Title	Writer(s)	Length
1.	"La Flor de la Canela"	Chabuca Granda	2:35
2.	"Cuando Pasará"	J. Seijas, L. G. Escolar	3:47
3.	"Quiero Rock"	J. Seijas, C. Villa, A. Monroy	2:34
4.	"Me Voy a Enamoriscar"	Juan Pardo	3:06
5.	"No Me Olvides"	Marilyn Pagan	3:27
6.	"Tu Te Imaginas"	A. Monroy, C. Villa, E. Díaz	3:14
7.	"Cielito Lindo"	D. R.	2:18
8.	"Bailemos en el Mar"	C. Villa, E. Díaz	3:13
9.	"Rock en la T.V."	C. Villa, E. Díaz	3:12
10.	"Xanadu"	Jeff Lynne	3:22
11.	"Es por Amor"	J. Seijas, C. Villa, E. Guerin	3:44
12.	"A Volar"	A. Monroy, C. Villa, E. Díaz	4:13

== Charts ==
Weekly chart for Adios Miguel
Chart (1983)	Peak position
US Billboard Top Latin Albums (California)	7
US Billboard Top Latin Albums (New York)	4

== Extensive links ==
- Adiós Miguel Discogs.
