= Felicidades (album) =

¡Felicidades!

Studio album by Menudo
- Released: December 1979
- Genre: Christmas, Holidays, Plena, Latin Pop
- Label: Padosa, Inc.
- Producer: Edgardo Diaz

Menudo chronology
Chiquitita (1979)	¡Felicidades! (1979)	Más, Mucho Más... (1980)

¡Felicidades! (Congratulations) is the fourth studio album and the first Christmas-themed album by the Puerto Rican boy band Menudo, released in 1979 by the record label Padosa. It features the Meléndez brothers, Carlos, Óscar, and Ricky, along with Fernando Sallaberry and René Farrait. This was the last album to feature Carlos Meléndez, as he reached the group's age limit of 15 in early 1980 and was replaced by Johnny Lozada.

According to author Damarisse Martínez Ruiz, albums like ¡Felicidades! served as a vehicle to expand the group into international markets, as evidenced by their appearance on the Spanish television show 300 millones, in 1979.

== Production and songs ==
Among the tracks on the album ¡Felicidades!, four compositions by Herminio de Jesús stand out. A renowned Puerto Rican songwriter with a deep connection to his country's traditional music, he contributed the following songs: "El chiji navideño", "Naqui quiñaqui", "Arre, caballito", and "Eso es lo mío".

Four of the songs are credited as "D. R.", an abbreviation of Derechos Reservados, which typically indicates that the works are traditional or of public domain origin, with no specific composer officially credited. These songs are: "Ensillando mi caballo", "Noche de paz", "A la banda de allá", and "Plena borinqueña". "Noche de paz" is the Spanish-language version of the well-known Christmas carol "Silent Night", originally written in German as "Stille Nacht" in 1818 by Franz Xaver Gruber (music) and Joseph Mohr (lyrics). "Plena borinqueña", as the title suggests, draws from the plena genre, an Afro-Puerto Rican musical tradition used historically for storytelling and social commentary.

== Release and promotion ==
To promote the album, the group performed on television programs. On 31 December 1979, they performed four songs from the album on the Spanish show 300 millones, broadcast on TVE1 in Spain, and transmitted via satellite to all member stations of the Organización de Televisión Iberoamericana (OTI) in Hispanic America and the United States, which aired it in their countries.

The album was not released in its entirety in the United States, but in 1983, the record label Profono included six of its ten tracks on a compilation titled Feliz Navidad — Con 14 Éxitos Navideños that also featured the group's second Christmas album, Es Navidad (1980), in full. This compilation was commercially successful, appearing on the Latin albums chart in Billboard magazine. The remaining four tracks from ¡Felicidades! were not included in any other Menudo releases.

== Reviews and analysis ==
In her book Menudo: El Reencuentro con la Verdad, author Damarisse Martínez Ruiz wrote that ¡Felicidades! and Menudo's other early works were not distinguished by their musical quality, instead featuring simplistic and underdeveloped content. Despite that she acknowledges that the songs were deliberately crafted with catchy choruses and youthful themes, targeting a teenage audience that had been largely overlooked by the music industry at the time.

== Track listing ==
No.	Title	Writer(s)	Lead vocal(s)	Length
1.	"El chiji navideño"	Herminio de Jesus	Full group
2.	"Ensillando mi caballo"	D. R.	Carlos Meléndez and Fernando Sallaberry
3.	"Naqui quiñaqui"	H. de Jesus	Full group
4.	"Noche de paz"	D. R.	René Farrait
5.	"Arre, caballito"	H. de Jesus	Oscar Meléndez
6.	"Eso es lo mío"	H. de Jesus	Oscar Meléndez and René Farrait
7.	"A la banda de Allá"	D. R.	Fernando Sallaberry and René Farrait
8.	"Me siento niño"	Leida E. Colon	Ricky Meléndez
9.	"Fue tu voz"	Antonio Morales	Carlos Meléndez
10.	"Plena borinqueña"	D. R.	Fernando Sallaberry
Total length:				29:41

== Personnel ==
Credits adapted from the liner notes of ¡Felicidades!.

- Production director: Edgardo Díaz
- Recording and mixing: V.U. Recording, San Juan, P.R.
- Recording engineers: Jonatan Castro, Edgardo Díaz
- Mixing: Vinny Urrutia, Edgardo Díaz
- Cover photo: courtesy of New York Department Stores
- Back cover: Rod Hernández
- Production assistant: Ricardo Pérez
- Cover layout: Pichy Ponla, René Zayas
- Cutting: Miguel Vega
- Cover cutting: The Lacquers Lab, San Juan, P.R.
- Arrangements: Miguel Monserrat
