= Feliz Navidad (Menudo album) =

Compilation album by Menudo
- Released: 1983
- Genre: Christmas
- Label: Profono Internacional

Menudo chronology
Adios Miguel (1983)	Feliz Navidad (1983)	A Todo Rock (1983)

Feliz Navidad (official title including subtitle: Feliz Navidad — Con 14 Éxitos Navideños) is a compilation album released by the Puerto Rican group Menudo in 1983 under the label Profono Internacional. The tracklist features fourteen songs previously released on two of the group’s Christmas-themed studio albums: ¡Felicidades! (1979) and Es Navidad (1980), both originally released by Padosa Records. The LP includes a colorful 12" x 12" Christmas card printed in four colors, featuring a holiday greeting from the quintet.

The aforementioned albums were recorded by two different lineups of the group. While ¡Felicidades! was performed by members Fernando Sallaberry, René Farrait, and the Meléndez brothers—Carlos, Óscar and Ricky—, Es Navidad featured Óscar and Ricky Meléndez, René Farrait, Johnny Lozada, and Xavier Serbiá. Despite this, the cover showcases newer members, all dressed as Santa Claus: Ricky Meléndez, Johnny Lozada, Xavier Serbiá, Miguel Cancel, and Charlie Massó.

Regarding its production, the backing vocals on the included tracks were enhanced by professional singers, including the group’s vocal coach, Marilyn Pagán. The two source albums were commercial successes. Es Navidad sold over 143,000 copies in Venezuela by October 1984, while the remastered digital version of ¡Felicidades! peaked at No. 70 on Mexico’s iTunes charts.

== Commercial performance ==
The album performed well in the United States, charting on Billboard’s Latin albums ranking. That same year, capitalizing on the buzz around member Miguel’s departure and Menudo’s growing popularity, the label released three more of the group’s albums. Together, the four albums achieved an impressive milestone, selling 750,000 copies in just three days.

== Track listings ==
Feliz Navidad — Con 14 Éxitos Navideños
No.	Title	Writer(s)	Singer(s)	Length
1.	"La Gallina"	H. de Jesus	René Farrait	4:07
2.	"Traigo Una Parranda"	H. de Jesus	Xavier Serbiá	2:51
3.	"Noche De Paz"	Gruber, Mohr	René Farrait	2:33
4.	"Las Nubes"	D.a.r	Johnny Lozada	2:44
5.	"Las Navidades"	H. de Jesus	Ricky Meléndez	3:02
6.	"Ensillando Mi Caballo"	D.a.r.	Carlos Meléndez and Fernando Sallaberry	2:33
7.	"Chiji Navideño"	H. de Jesus	All group members	2:50
8.	"Mi Parranda"	H. de Jesus	Óscar Meléndez	2:50
9.	"El Tamborilero"	Adapted by E. Diaz	Johnny Lozada	3:11
10.	"Eso Es Lo Mío"	H. de Jesus	Óscar Meléndez and René Farrait	3:13
11.	"Ñaqui Quiñaqui"	H. de Jesus	All group members	3:21
12.	"Voy También"	C. Alonso	Johnny Lozada	2:32
13.	"Año Nuevo Y Reyes"	J. de D. Guzmán	Johnny Lozada	1:59
14.	"Plena Borinqueña"	D.a.r	Fernando Sallaberry	2:50

== Charts ==
Weekly chart performance for Feliz Navidad
Chart (1983–1984)	Peak position
US Top Latin Albums – California (Billboard)	10
US Top Latin Albums – Florida (Billboard)	14
US Top Latin Albums – New York (Billboard)	6
US Top Latin Albums – Texas (Billboard)	2
