= Es Navidad =

Studio album by Menudo
- Released: 1980
- Genre: Latin pop

Menudo chronology
Más, Mucho Más... (1980)	Es Navidad (1980)	Fuego (1981)

Es Navidad (It's Christmas) is the sixth studio album and second Christmas album by the Puerto Rican boy band Menudo, released in 1980 by Padosa Records. The group members at the time were the Meléndez brothers, Óscar and Ricky, René Farrait, Johnny Lozada, and Xavier Serbiá.

Regarding its production, as with their previous albums, the backing vocals were enhanced by professional singers including the group's vocal coach, Marilyn Pagán. The tracklist includes two songs that also appeared on their previous album ¡Felicidades! (1979): "El chiji navideño" and "Eso es lo mío".

The album wasn't released in the United States, but in 1983 all its songs were included in the compilation Feliz Navidad — Con 14 éxitos navideños, released exclusively in that country. The LP and cassette versions featured different cover art showing the group members dressed as Santa Claus. The tracklist added four songs from their previous Christmas album ¡Felicidades!. The album performed well in the U.S., appearing on Billboard magazine's Latin albums chart.

== Critical reception ==
According to Damarisse Martínez Ruiz, author of the book Menudo: El Reencuentro con la Verdad, the album's production doesn't stand out for its musical quality, featuring simplistic and underdeveloped content.

== Commercial performance ==
Commercially, the album was successful in Venezuela, becoming Menudo's first recording to sell 100,000 copies in that country. According to an October 1984 report in the American magazine Cashbox, sales had exceeded 150,000 units in Venezuela by that date. On April 9, 2023, the digital remastered version of the album reached #70 on Mexico's iTunes charts.

== Track listings ==
Es Navidad
No.	Title	Writer(s)	Singer(s)	Length
1.	"La Gallina"	Herminio de Jesus	René Farrait	4:09
2.	"Traigo Una Parranda"	H. de Jesus	Xavier Serbiá	2:51
3.	"Las Nubes"	H. de Jesus	Johnny Lozada	2:45
4.	"Las Navidades"	H. de Jesus	Ricky Meléndez	3:04
5.	"Chiji Navideño"	H. de Jesus	All group members	2:53
6.	"Mi Parranda"	H. de Jesus	Óscar Meléndez	2:52
7.	"El Tamborilero"	Adapted by Ed Diaz	Johnny Lozada	3:10
8.	"Eso Es Lo Mío"	H. de Jesus	Óscar Meléndez and René Farrait	3:14
9.	"Voy También"	Curet Alonso	Johnny Lozada	2:34
10.	"Año Nuevo Y Reyes"	Juan de Dios Guzmán	Johnny Lozada	2:01

== Certifications and sales ==
Region	Certification	Estimated sales
Venezuela	Gold	150,000
