= Más, Mucho Más... =

Studio album by Menudo
- Released: 1980
- Studio: Padosa
- Genre: Latin Pop

Menudo chronology
| Felicidades (1979) | Más, Mucho Más... (1980) | Es Navidad (1980) |

Más, Mucho Más... (English: More, Much More...) is the fifth studio album by the Puerto Rican boy band Menudo, released in 1980 under the label Padosa. Produced by Edgardo Díaz, with arrangements by Miguel Moriarty and Alejandro Monroy, it was recorded in studios in Puerto Rico and Spain and featured enhanced vocals and songs aimed at a young audience.

The group's lineup at the time consisted of the Meléndez brothers, Óscar and Ricky, along with Fernando Sallaberry and René Farrait, as well as new member Johnny Lozada, who replaced Carlos.

In the same year as its release, two compilations with the same title were launched—one in Panama (containing ten tracks, only three of which were from the original album) and another in Venezuela (keeping the original title and cover). The album's promotion included television performances, with the track "No quiero decir adiós" standing out as the closing theme for the group's show on the Telemundo television network.

== Production and recording ==
The album was produced by Edgardo Díaz and featured arrangements by Miguel Moriarty and Alejandro Monroy. Recording took place at VU Recording Studios (Puerto Rico) and EXA Music (Spain), with technical assistance from Jordán Castro and Vinny Urrutia. The graphic design was created by Mecánica Graf, while the cover was designed by René Zayas, and the photos were taken by Rita Hernández. The final cuts of the album were done at The Lacquer Lab.

The track "Madre" features guest vocals by Inés, Mirta, Rosa, and Patty. The songs followed the pattern of previous releases: simple, romantic, with youthful themes and catchy choruses, aimed at a young audience. To enhance the vocal quality, the backing vocals were reinforced by professionals, including the group's vocal coach, Marilyn Pagán.

== Versions ==
In the same year as the album's release, the record label Prodim launched a compilation in Panama with the same title. This compilation featured a selection of ten tracks, presenting a completely different repertoire from the original album—except for the songs "Más, mucho más", "No quiero decir adiós", and "No, que no". The cover of this compilation had a distinct design. In Venezuela, the label Colibrí used the same tracklist as the Panamanian compilation but kept the original name, title, and cover of Más, Mucho Más...

== Promotion ==
To promote the album, the group performed on various television shows.

In Venezuela, they appeared on programs aired by RCTV. On Fantástico, hosted by Guillermo "Fantástico" González and Neyda Plessman, they performed the song "No que no". On the show Estamos Contentos, they sang "Más, mucho más".

The album's closing track, "No quiero decir adiós", became particularly popular among fans as it served as the closing theme for La Gente Joven de Menudo, a TV show broadcast on Saturdays by Telemundo in the early 1980s. At the time of the album's release, the program was still growing in popularity.

== Track listing ==
Studio album
| No. | Title | Writer(s) | Vocalist(s) | Length |
|---|---|---|---|---|
| 1. | "Más, mucho más" | L. Seijas, C. Villa, E. Guerín | Full group | 3:23 |
| 2. | "Madre" | Juan Carlos Calderón | René Farrait | 4:03 |
| 3. | "No que no" | C. Martínez Varon, D. Vona, G. P. Felisatti | Óscar Meléndez | 2:56 |
| 4. | "Cuando yo era pequeño" | L. Seijas, C. Villa, E. Guerín | René Farrait and Johnny Lozada | 3:14 |
| 5. | "Háblame de ti" | Pedro José Herrero | Carlos Meléndez and Fernando Sallaberry | 3:11 |
| 6. | "A bailar" | J. Segura, R. Méndez | René Farrait | 3:00 |
| 7. | "Mentira para dos" | José Luis Perales | Carlos Meléndez and Fernando Sallaberry | 3:30 |
| 8. | "Demasiado para mi cuerpo" | L. Seijas, F. O. Donaggio | Ricky Meléndez | 3:12 |
| 9. | "Cara dura" | María Veranes, J. C. Calderón | Fernando Sallaberry | 3:27 |
| 10. | "No quiero decir adiós" | Edgardo Díaz, F. De Diego | Carlos Meléndez and Fernando Sallaberry | 3:38 |

Compilation album
| No. | Title | Writer(s) | Vocalist(s) | Length |
|---|---|---|---|---|
| 1. | "Voy a America" | L. Seijas, C. Villa, E. Guerín | Full group |
| 2. | "Solo tu amor" | E. Díaz, Celi Bee | René Farrait |
| 3. | "Laura" | J. Seijas, L. G. Escolar | Full group |
| 4. | "No que no" | Carmine Ewan, D. Voano, G. P. Felisatti | Óscar Meléndez |
| 5. | "No quiero decir adiós" | E. Díaz, F. de Diego | Carlos Meléndez and Fernando Sallaberry |
| 6. | "Ella a-a" | J. Seijas, H. Herrero, L. G. Escolar | Full group |
| 7. | "Mi mejor amiga" | Centeno | Fernando Sallaberry |
| 8. | "Cucubano" | Curet Alonso | Carlos Meléndez |
| 9. | "Más, mucho más" | J. Seijas, C. Villa, E. Guerín | Full group |
| 10. | "Voulez-Vous (Quiere usted)" | B. Andersson, B. Ulvaeus, adapt. E. Díaz | Full group |
