= Proyecto M =

Puerto Rican boy band

Proyecto M was a Puerto Rican boy band from the 1980s and 1990s. The band's name came about because all band members were at one point members of boy band Menudo.

Band members initially included Johnny Lozada, Rene Farrait and Xavier Serbia. Initially, other former Menudo like Fernando Sallaberry and Melendez brothers Carlos, Oscar and Ricky Melendez reunited on a project - a group- they were going to call XCHANGE. In 1987, there was some publicity, and they recorded a few demos, but were not offered a recording contract and disbanded. Eventually, Farrait, Lozada and Serbia formed Proyecto M that same year. A few years later, Serbia left the band and was substituted by Ray Reyes, the same singer who had also replaced him in Menudo.

The band had success in Puerto Rico and in Venezuela, where they participated as actors in a telenovela named "Alba Marina".

Including three greatest hits compilations, Proyecto M released a total of eight albums before disbanding in 1994.

In the late 1990s, Ray Reyes contacted with various other former members of Menudo to form "El Reencuentro", a band which first performed in 1998 and enjoyed more success than Proyecto M and which included Reyes, Lozada, Farrait, Ricky Melendez, Miguel Cancel and Charlie Masso. Serbia declined to participate in El Reencuentro, citing personal reasons.

== Burger King commercial ==
During the late 1980s, Proyecto M, which at the time included Farrait, Lozada and Serbia, recorded a popular commercial for Burger King in Puerto Rico, as part of a brand campaign that also included Rosita Velazquez, Jose Miguel Agrelot, Luisito and Roberto Vigoreaux, Chucho Avellanet, Mario Morales and fellow former Menudo member Charlie Masso.

== See also ==
- El Reencuentro
