= Edward Aguilera =

Spanish singer

- Birth name: Edward Alberto Aguilera Enchautegui
- Born: 17 December 1976 (age 48); Spain
- Occupation: Singer
- Years active: 1990–1991
- Formerly of: Menudo

Edward Alberto Aguilera Enchautegui (born December 17, 1976, in Spain) is a Spanish singer.

== Singing career ==
Aguilera became the only European in boy band Menudo (but not the first, as Fernando Sallaberry was also born in Spain) in December 13, 1990 at the age of 13, when he, along with Venezuelan actor Jonathan Montenegro, both replaced Sergio Gonzalez and Rubén Gómez when the two were involved in a drug scandal in Miami International Airport back in November 22, 1990, resulting in Gonzalez and Gomez to be expelled. Edgardo Diaz had plans to internationalize the band's line-up at the time, as all Menudos from past eras had been Puerto Ricans. When Aguilera joined, he became a bandmate of Menudo's first non-Puerto Rican member, Mexico's Adrian Olivares. For a small period from December 1990-April 1991, Aguilera became a teen idol in Puerto Rico and other Latin Countries.

Aguilera, Montenegro and two other band members, Robert Avellanet and Rawy Torres left the group after a problematic 1991 year that due to the reputation that Sergio and Ruben had done, but as well as the band to be almost broken by a scandal in which Ralphy Rodriguez and his father accused Edgardo Diaz and Joselo (Menudo's choreographer), among others, of sexual abuse. The charges against Diaz and Joselo were never proven at the time (This was two decades before Roy Rossello called him out in 2014) and Olivares was the only member not to leave the band since Edgardo decided to renew his contract with more money and leadership. He was proposed to join a spinoff group called Euphoria with both Robert and Rawy, but instead, he declined to join the group, which eventually made him to lose the desire to sing nor perform.

The comparatively massive leaving of Menudo members at the time opened spaces for Abel Talamantez, Cuban American Ashley Ruiz, Puerto-Rican Andy Blazquez and Dominican Alexis Grullon, among others, to join the group.

Edward Aguilera left the group without recording any CDs with them.

== After Menudo ==
Aguilera's singing career fizzled after he left Menudo. He pursued in career in surfing and then later in architecture. He's currently married and is unknown how many kids he has, though it implicates he has one daughter.

== See also ==
- List of Spaniards
