= Menudo =

Menudo can refer to:

- Menudo (group), Puerto Rican boy band
  - Menudo (album), a 1985 album by the band
  - Menudo: La Película, a 1982 film featuring the band
  - Menudo: La Reunion, a 2005 music project composed of former band members
- Menudo (soup), traditional Mexican soup
- Menudo (stew), Filipino meat stew
