= No Me Corten El Pelo =

Studio album by Menudo
- Released: December 1, 1990
- Genre: Latin Pop, Latin Rock, Rock
- Length: 33:44
- Label: Sonografica, Melody, Sonotone Music Corp.
- Producer: Jesus Enrique Gonzalez, Luis Oliver, Ezequiel Serrano

Menudo chronology
Os Ultimos Herois (1990)	No Me Corten El Pelo (1990)	Detrás De Tu Mirada (1991)

No Me Corten El Pelo (Don't Cut My Hair) is a studio album by the Puerto Rican boy band Menudo, released in 1990. The lineup for the quintet included Sergio Gonzalez, Rubén Gómez, Robert Avellanet, Rawy Torres, and new member Adrián Olivares, after César Abreu left the group.

== Promotion ==
Events surrounding the album's release and promotion marked a significant crisis in Menudo's history. In November 1990, Gonzalez and Gómez were detained at Miami Airport for marijuana possession and were expelled from the group a few days before the album's release on December 1. Management quickly replaced both with Edward Aguilera and Jonathan Montenegro, forming a new lineup composed of Robert, Rawy, Adrian, Edward, and Jonathan.

Months later, on April 6, 1991, another crisis unfolded: Avellanet, Torres, Aguilera, and Montenegro announced their departure from the group due to physical, psychological, and emotional abuse. Although Edgardo Díaz, Menudo's manager, denied the allegations, management decided to replace them with new members: Alexis Grullón, Abel Talamántez, Andy Blázquez, and Ashley Ruiz, in an attempt to stabilize the group.

== Critica reception ==
Regarding reviews from music critics, AllMusic rated it three out of five stars, although no accompanying text was provided to justify the rating.

== Commercial performance ==
Commercially, despite the incidents, the album was a success. According to Cashbox magazine, the quintet recorded significant sales with the album, after periods of low sales in their discography. In the United States, it reached the 22nd position on the Billboard Latin Pop Albums chart. In Puerto Rico, it ranked 15th on the Cashbox Latin LPs chart.

== Track listing ==
No.	Title	Writer(s)	Singer(s)	Length
1.	"No Me Corten El Pelo"	Juan Carlos Perez Soto	Robert Avellanet	3:23
2.	"Necesito Hablar Con Ella"	Carlos Villa and Alejandro Monroy	Sergio Blass	3:23
3.	"Solamente Tú"	Juan Carlos Perez Soto	Rawy Torres	3:32
4.	"Solo En La Madrugada"	Carlos Lara	Adrian Olivares	3:13
5.	"Tú, Simplemente Tú"	Fernando Osorio	Ruben Gomez	3:11
6.	"Grito En La Oscuridad"	Carlos Lara	Adrian Olivares	3:49
7.	"Te Recordaré"	Jesus Monarrez	Robert Avellanet	3:40
8.	"Mi Banda Me Traicionó"	Carlos Villa and Alejandro Monroy	Sergio Blass	2:49
9.	"Menudamente Solos"	Juan Carlos Perez Soto	Ruben Gomez	3:11
10.	"Baila"	Carlos Lara	Rawy Torres	3:24

== Charts ==
Weekly chart for No Me Corten El Pelo
Music chart (1990)	Peak position
United States (Billboard Latin Pop Albums)	22
Puerto Rico (Cashbox Puerto Rico Latin LPs)	15
