= Ralphy Rodríguez =

Puerto Rican musician

Ralphy Rodriguez (born April 17, 1973, in Carolina, Puerto Rico) is a singer/songwriter, musician, producer, and former member of Menudo. He replaced Charlie Massó.

Ralphy joined Menudo in late 1986 as Charlie Masso's replacement. He was a member of a Menudo line-up that included Ricky Martin, Raymond Acevedo, Sergio Blass, Ruben Gomez and Robi Rosa. His first project with Menudo was acting in the 100 episode soap opera “Por siempre amigos” which had the boyband living in Buenos Aires, Argentina for 6 months during the filming of the project. It aired in 1987 on WAPA TV in Puerto Rico, in Argentina, and few other markets.

Ralphy’s first performance with Menudo was at the Araneta Coliseum in Manila Philippines in late 1986, where he was first introduced as newest member of the group. His first performance in Puerto Rico was on Jan 6th, 1987 at the Hiram Bithorn Coliseum for the boyband’s yearly “Three Kings Day” concert.

He sang the songs "Cuando Seas Grande" and "Y Te Veré (A Las Tres)" featured on the Spanish album Somos Los Hijos del Rock as well as “Come back to me” and “Sa Bawat Halik” from the English album “In Action” released in the Philippines. In December of 1987, Ralphy was pulled out of the group by his parents, citing improper treatment by management.

In 1991, Edgardo Diaz (the band’s founder) was accused by ex members of Menudo of physical and sexual abuse towards Menudo members in various interviews. In a May 1991 Univision Television Program Cristina Show, with Rodriguez and his dad present as main accusers, Diaz denied the allegations. Diaz has been the target of several sexual crime allegations by former Menudo members. Roy Rossello accused him of sexual abuse during a Brazilian reality show's transmission on October 21, 2014.

Rodríguez became a born-again Christian in 1995, and released 3 Christian Inspirational CD’s between 1998-2008. In 1998 he released the Independent Album “Ralphy - El pie del mundo”, then released two albums with the Christian Label Canzion, “Ralphy - Quiero” in 2001 and “Ralphy Rodriguez - Voy a Tí” in 2008, which features a duet with Marcos Witt “Volví a vivir”, written by Juan Pablo Manzanero. He’s a Latin Grammy recipient as one of the vocalists on Marcos Witt’s 2004 award winning album “Recordando Otra Vez”, where he sang lead vocal on the classic “Peña de Horeb” as well as background vocals on the album.

After various years away from music to focus on raising a family with his wife, he made his return to music in 2017. He is co-founder, lead vocalist and bass player for the international pop-rock band “2080 VEINTE/OCHENTA”. The band released their first single “Lo haré por ti” on August 31, 2020.

Ralphy Rodriguez took part of the HBO Max Documentary "Menudo: Forever Young" alongside 12 other former Menudo members who shared their real life experiences within the iconic boyband. This 4 part mini-series was released on June 23, 2022.

During one of former "Los Chamos" member Gabriel Fernandez's YouTube "Retro Show" podcasts in 2023, it was revealed that Rodriguez and his former Menudo bandmates Sergio Gonzalez (Sergio Blass), Raymond Acevedo and Ruben Gomez would go on tour as a super-group they named "Evoluxion", which would emulate another super-group of former Menudo members, "El Reencuentro". "Evoluxion" was Rodriguez's idea. The X in EvoluXion is because in Spanish, "ex" is commonly used as a word that means "former", and the band is, like Proyecto M, composed of former Menudo members. EvoluXion released their first single “Sin querer” in August of 2024 and did their first live concert in Mexico City on Nov. 24 of the same year.

== Discography ==
=== With Menudo ===
- Somos Los Hijos del Rock (1987)
- In Action (1987)

=== Solo ===
- El pie del mundo (1998)
- Quiero (2001)
- Voy a Ti (2008)

== See also ==
- List of Puerto Ricans
- Bolivar Arellano - who accompanied Rodriguez to a television show to accuse Edgardo Diaz
