= Rubén Gómez (singer) =

American singer and actor (born 1974)

Ruben Gomez
- Also known as: Ruben Gomez, Ruben Gomez Kane, Reuben Gaumes, Ruben Kane,
- Born: Ruben Gomez Cotti; April 25, 1974 (age 51); Brooklyn, New York, NY
- Genres: Pop rock, rock, latin rock
- Occupations: singer, songwriter, actor
- Labels: Arista Latin, BMG Records, Ariola
- Formerly of: Menudo, Kings Harem, Banda Exoluxion

Ruben Gomez (born Ruben Gomez Cotti; April 25, 1974) is an American singer, actor and former member of the Puerto Rican boy band Menudo.

== Biography ==
Ruben Gomez was born in Brooklyn, New York, NY on April 25, 1974, of Puerto Rican ancestry. He began his career in New York at a young age, participating in television commercials for national companies such as McDonald's and Roy Rogers. He studied acting and starred in roles in plays including the Broadway production of "Oliver!" and the film "A Time to Remember." At the age of 10, he released a first single album titled "No es una ilusión", a Spanish version of "Puppy Love" previously popularized by Paul Anka.

He joined Menudo in Early 1987, at the age of thirteen, replacing Robby Rosa. During his tenure in this group he performed songs in Spanish, English, Portuguese and participated in seven albums. Along with Sergio Blass, Robert Avellanet, Rawy Torres and Angelo Garcia, Rubén filmed the series "Los Ulitmos Heroes", the videohome "No me Corten el Pelo" and the series "Menudomania", which was very successful in Puerto Rico. By the time he was 15 or 16, Ruben stood at 6 ft 1 in (1.85 m), making him the biggest Menudo member by height.

On November 22, 1990, on their way from Mexico to Venezuela, Ruben and Sergio were arrested at Miami International Airport for drug possession and consequently dismissed from Menudo. Ruben was eventually replaced by Venezuelan Actor, Jonathan Montenegro.

Gomez launches his solo career under the Arista Latin label with the album of the same name. The production, which has acoustic sounds, was made by the Argentine Daniel Freiberg (Cristian), also includes romantic ballads. The album was released on July 29, 1997. Rubén, along with Freiberg, chose songs that reflect his musical influences, personality, and performing style. In addition, producer Freiberg is an outstanding composer who in this case contributed songs of his own especially written for Rubén, such as the first single "Me Vuelves Loco", a contagious and rhythmic song. "Me Vuelves Loco" features a video filmed in Mexico City. An impressive team of prominent composers and their works complete the Ruben Gomez album: Argentine singer-songwriter Alejandro Lerner and his rock song "Nena Neurotica;" ex-Menudo Raymond Acevedo and his translation of the passionate ballad "Perdido;" and a contemporary version of the ballad "Porque Yo Te Amo," a 1970s hit performed by Spanish pop music icon Sandro. In 1998, he recorded a duet with Filipina actress/singer Angelika Dela Cruz as part of her second album, "My Only Wish".

In 2005, Ruben became part of Menudo: La Reunion, with Roy Rossello, Raymond Acevedo, Sergio Blass, and Andy Blázquez, then later Anthony Galindo and MDOCaleb Avilés, before the group disbanded in early 2006. During the short time, The group made TV appearances and even recorded a demo & video of new version of 'Sabes a Chocolate'—with a more reggaeton-hip/hop beat.

Months later, after the Menudo:La Reunion tour, both Ruben and Anthony Galindo reunited as a new duo called Blacksheep, where the duo sang and performed primarily in the Brazil area. However, Ruben was involved in an accident in Rio de Janeiro when he was crossing the traffic and the traffic lights turned green and the car came towards him and hit him. Ruben was not seriously injured.

Ruben became the lead vocalist of rock band Kings Harem with John Crisci (guitars), Jon Orth (drums), John Seput (keyboard) and Jerry Capri (bass). During Kings Harem, Ruben recorded four singles released in 2012. Ruben is currently in a group Banda Evoluxion, with the lineup from Somos Los Hijos Del Rock, specifically Raymond Acevedo, Ralphy Rodriguez and Sergio Blass (Ricky Martin was the only one who didn't participate in the group).

== Discography ==
=== With Menudo ===
- Somos Los Hijos del Rock (1987)
- In Action (1987)
- Sons of Rock (1988)
- Sombras & Figuras (1988)
- Los Últimos Héroes (1989)
- Menudo: Edicion Brasil (1990)
- No Me Corten El Pelo (1990)

=== Solo career ===
- Ruben Gomez (1997)
- Z - The Masked Musical of Zorro (1999) - We do what we must do
- Tomorrow Forever (2000) Single
- Baila Baila Conmigo (2001) Single
- Down by the Riverside - Kings Harem (2012) Single
- Shake it up! - Kings Harem (2012) Single
- Alone From You- Kings Harem (2012) Single
- Feels Real Good- Kings Harem (2012) Single
- Nina Luna (2013) Single
- Zorro Love Duets: The Musical of Zorro (2013)
- Ruben (2016)

== Theatre ==
Year	Title	Role	Notes
1984	Oliver!	Workhouse Boy / Fagin's Gang	Broadway/Known as Ruben Cuevas
1986	Lady With a View	Johnny	Known as Reuben Gaumes at the time
1987	The Knife	Choir Boy, Kitchen Boy	Off-Broadway

== Filmography ==
Year	Title	Role	Notes
1987	Magic Sticks	Street kid #1	Movie
1988	A Time to Remember	Angelo Villano	Filming occurred in 1985–1986. TV Movie
1990	Los Últimos Héroes	Ruben Gomez (Main Character)	4 episode Miniseries.
1994	24 Hours in Rock and Roll	Self	TV Movie
2002	Big Trouble	Boundman 3	Movie
2010	Red Dead Redemption	Voiceover	
2011	Drones, Clones and Pheromones	Alpha MIBs	
