= Xanadu (Menudo album) =

Studio album by Menudo
- Released: 1981
- Genre: Latin pop

Menudo chronology
Fuego (1981)	Xanadu (1981)	Quiero Ser (1981)

Xanadu (1981) is Menudo's eighth Spanish album and the second one released in 1981 featuring René Farrait, Johnny Lozada, Ricky Meléndez, Xavier Serbiá and Miguel Cancel. Half of the songs on the album were previously featured on past albums and re-recorded with this new line up; the other half of the songs are from other English-speaking groups that were big hits in the late 1970s and early 1980s, translated into Spanish, like Queen, Kiss, Village People, ABBA, Olivia Newton-John and Electric Light Orchestra.

The album sold over 19,000 LPs in Peru and about a quarter of that amount in cassettes in the first month of release.

== Track listing ==
No.	Title	Singer(s)	Length
1.	"Xanadu"	Miguel Cancel	3:18
2.	"No Se Puede Parar La Música"	René Farrait	3:03
3.	"No Que No"	Oscar Melendez	2:58
4.	"Fui Hecho Para Amarte"	Johnny Lozada	4:02
5.	"Sueños"	René Farrait	2:48
6.	"Cosita Loca Llamada Amor"	René Farrait	2:38
7.	"Ella-a-a"	Group	5:01
8.	"Voulez Vous"	Group	3:48
9.	"A Bailar"	René Farrait	2:49
10.	"Voy A América"	René Farrait	2:57

== Charts ==
Chart (1981)	Peak position
Argentina (Cashbox)	6
Uruguay (Record World)	13
