= Jonathan Montenegro =

Venezuelan actor and singer (born 1978)

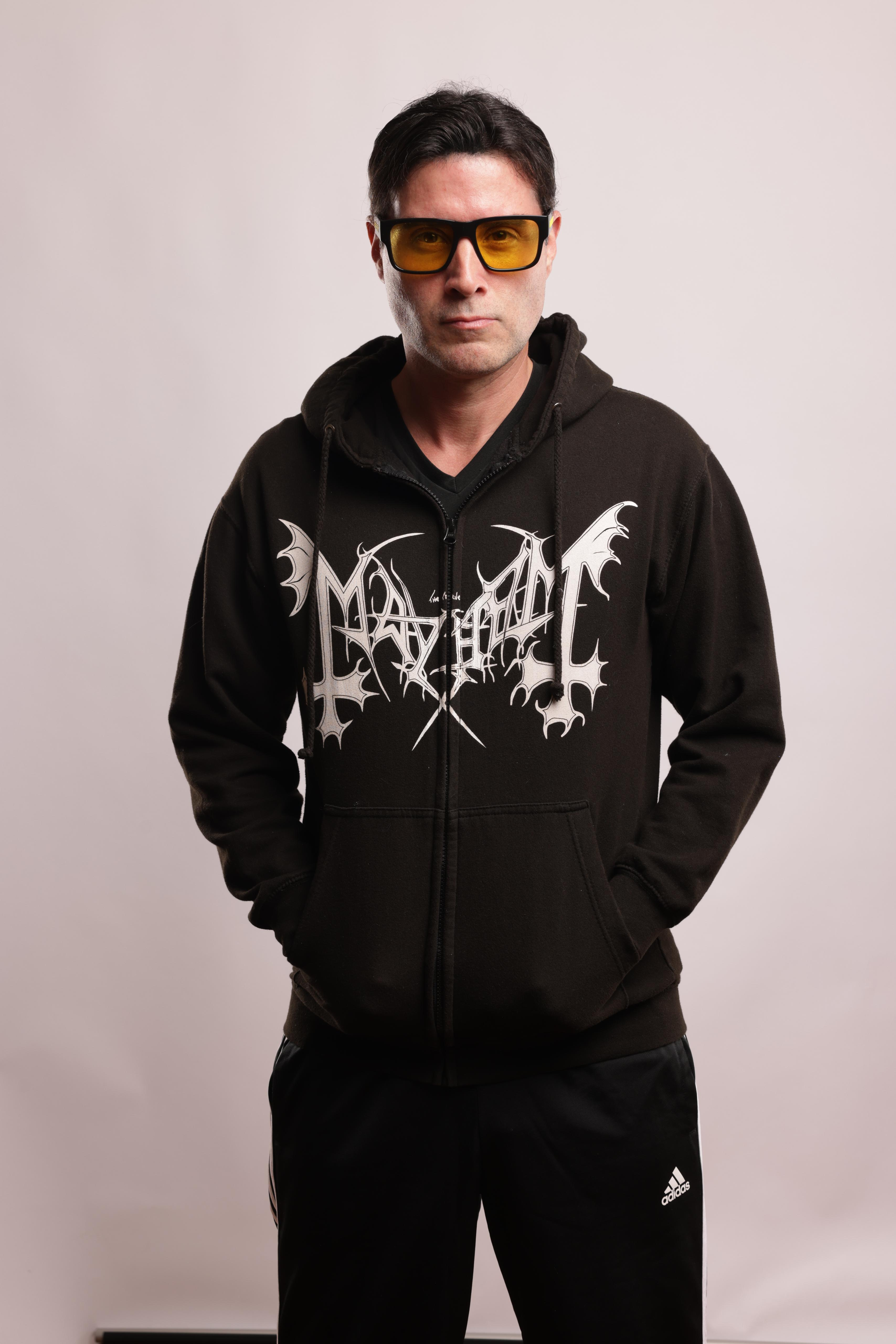
- Montenegro in 2024
- Born: Jonathan Daniel Montenegro Uzcátegui; May 11, 1978 (age 47); Caracas, Venezuela
- Citizenship: Venezuela; United States
- Occupations: Actor; singer
- Years active: 1984–present
- Spouse(s): Juliet Lima (m. 2003; div. 2008) Patricia Schwarzgruber (m. 2008; div. 2012)
- Partner(s): Yelena Maciel (2011–2014); Alejandra Torres (2020)
- Children: 4
- Musical career
- Origin: Venezuela
- Genres: Pop rock; heavy metal
- Instrument: Vocals
- Formerly of: Menudo

Jonathan Daniel Montenegro Uzcátegui (born May 11, 1978) is a Venezuelan actor and singer. Montenegro was a member of the popular Puerto Rican boy band Menudo.

== Early life ==
Jonathan Daniel Montenegro Uzcátegui was born on May 11, 1978. He was mostly raised by his grandmother and his maternal aunt since he was orphaned by his parents. Montenegro's American dad died when he was 7 months old on New Years' Eve 1978 and his mother lost her life in 1984 to the underworld in Caracas, while he was 6 years old, just weeks prior for his show business career to begin.

== Career ==
Montenegro has been involved in show business since he was a small child, being chosen in 1984 to act in two Radio Caracas Television telenovelas, "El Analisis" and "La Ciudad Muerta" ("Ghost Town"), both of which had been written by the well-known Venezuelan writer and politician, Rómulo Gallegos.

In 1985, Montenegro made three theater plays and he debuted in film, making two Venezuelan movies. In addition to that, Montenegro obtained a second place in the prestigious "Festimagico Infantil" ("Magic Children's Festival") talent show, which was held by Venevisión.

By 1986, Montenegro would embark in a modeling career, making some television commercials and appearing on some catalogs. He made three telenovelas and one film that year. One of the telenovelas he made that year was "La Intrusa", considered a classic by Latin American critics.

In 1987, Montenegro began exploring his singing abilities, as he was cast on three musicals. He also became active in a national campaign against brain stroke that year.

1988 was a year of firsts for Montenegro, as he debuted on radio with a talk show named "Tren Fantasia" ("Fantasy Train"), and also as a show host, on Radio Caracas Television's "Festival Fantastico Infantil" ("Children's Fantastic Festival"). Montenegro's popularity in Venezuela helped for the directors of Miami's annual "Festival de la Calle 8", a very popular festival among Hispanics, to invite him for the festival's 1989 version.

That same year, Montenegro participated in a television comedy show, a game show, a mini-series and another soap opera. He was also discovered by Edgardo Díaz, who saw the eleven-year-old actor participate alongside Menudo in "Los Ultimos Heroes", a soap opera based on Menudo's latest album, "Los Ultimos Heroes".

In 1990, Montenegro acted alongside Antonio Banderas in a film named Terranova. On December 10 of that year, Montenegro signed with Menudo, becoming the first Venezuelan and first South American member of the band. He joined Mexico's Adrian Olivares, who had previously become the first non-Puerto Rican member of Menudo and Spain's Edward Aguilera.

In 1991 Montenegro, along with three of his bandmates (Edward, Robert and Rawy) left the group. Jonathan has never mentioned any specific reasons as to why he left, but by the time he did, he had already become a teen idol across Latin America and in Spain, where he toured and had to schedule a special autograph and photo session with his Madrid fans before leaving the European country.

Montenegro spent two years in Venezuela after that, recording four telenovelas. In 1993 he was cast in telenovela Dulce Ilusión. From 1994 to 1995, Montenegro left show business periodically, concentrating on getting his high school diploma and taking English classes in the United States.

Montenegro returned to acting in 1996, by participating in "Sol de Tentacion". He participated in two television shows that year.

By 1997, Montenegro was a full-fledged member of the Venevisión roster. He participated in two Venevisión soap operas between then and 1998, including "Samantha", where he played a drug addict. That characterization earned him an award as Venezuela's "Best young television actor".

In 1999, Montenegro left acting to become a producer, once again, on radio. He began to produce "Tu Generacion", a radio show geared towards Venezuelan heavy metal music fans. The show has remained on the air, but without Montenegro since the early 2000s.

In 2000, Montenegro resumed acting in television series Mis 3 hermanas.

In 2002, Montenegro was in telenovela Juana la virgen.

In 2003, Montenegro was in television series La Cuaima.

In 2005, Montenegro was in television series Dueña y Señora in Puerto Rico.

In 2006, Montenegro was in television series Voltea pa' que te enamores.

Jonathan Montenegro later embarked on a solo singing career, releasing a total of two CD's. Combined with his one CD as a member of Menudo and another with a group of former Menudo members (not El Reencuentro, Montenegro's group is named Menudomania Forever), Montenegro has participated in a total of four CDs. He continues on with his career as a solo singer.

Montenegro married the Venezuelan actress Yelena Maciel in 2011 with the couple having their only child daughter in 2012. They divorced in 2014. Since 2017, Jonathan is currently residing in Florida, where he is currently in a relationship and has four kids (3 girls and 1 boy).

== Filmography ==
=== Films ===
Year	Title	Role	Notes
1986	De mujer a mujer	Unknown role	Debut film
1989	Cuchillos de fuego	David	
1991	Terra Nova	Gaspare	
2014	Espejos	Mel	

=== Television ===
Year	Title	Role	Notes
1985	Rebeca	Luisito	Television debut
1986	La dama de rosa	Diego Suárez	
1987	La intrusa	Andrés	
1988	Alma mía	Leonardo	
1989	El engaño	Pablo	
1993	Dulce ilusión	Lalo	
1996	Sol de tentación	Luis Alejandro Romero	
1997	Contra viento y marea	Ignacio	
1998	Samantha	Alexánder Hernández	
2000	Mis 3 hermanas	Francisco Moreno	
2002	Juana la virgen	David	
2003	La cuaima	Simón Alvarenga	
2006	Mujer de mundo	Unknown role	
2006	Dueña y señora	Carlos Alberto Peña	
2006–2007	Voltea pa' que te enamores	Luis Fernando García Malavé	Lead role
2009	Libres como el viento	Miguel Ángel Marino	Lead role
2012	Mi ex me tiene ganas	Pablo Naranjo	
2015	Los hijos de Don Juan	Amir Santander	Supporting role ( Season 1)
2017	Prueba de Fe	Diego	1 chapter

== Curiosity ==
- Canadian Metal- Symphonic singer Axelle Doyon is her Fan.

== See also ==
- List of Venezuelans
