= Miguel Cancel =

Member of Menudo, boy band

- Born: Miguel Ángel Cancel Vázquez; June 28, 1967 (age 59); Chicago, Illinois, U.S.
- Occupations: Singer, actor, police officer
- Children: 4

Miguel Ángel Cancel Vázquez (born June 28, 1967) is a Puerto Rican singer, actor and retired police officer who began his career with the Puerto Rico-based boy band Menudo.

== Career ==
=== Menudo ===
Miguel was born in Chicago, Illinois as the only child of Gloria and Felix Cancel. Miguel joined Menudo as a singer in 1981, replacing Óscar Meléndez. He was the first bilingual element on the band, and he was part of the most iconic age of the band called "the golden age" next to Xavier Serbiá, René Farrait, Ricky Meléndez, Johnny Lozada, Charlie Massó and Ray Reyes, collaborating in making Menudo an international sensation, with LP albums like Fuego, Quiero Ser, Por Amor and Una Aventura Llamada Menudo.

He acted in the 2 movies Menudo appeared at, Menudo: La Pelicula in 1981 and Una Aventura Llamada Menudo in 1982, and the two mini series Quiero Ser and Es Por Amor next to Xavier Serbiá, Johnny Lozada, Charlie Massó, Ricky Meléndez and René Farrait, and he also appeared on the TV show, La Gente Joven de Menudo on Telemundo PR as a member of the group.

In 1983, Cancel quit drastically Menudo at the age of 15, a year before the mandatory retirement age of 16, due to his desire to live a "normal life", even as his voice was already recorded for Menudo's next album, "A Todo Rock". He was replaced by Roy Rosselló.

Cancel sang lead on various Menudo hits, including A Volar, Cuándo Pasará, Por Amor, Xanadú, Quiero Rock, Me Voy A Enamoriscar etc.

Miguel entered at the start of 1981 and left at the end of 1983, an era that was part of what is the golden age of the band and the international "menuditis" era, the band becoming famous on countries like the U.S., Mexico, Peru and others

=== After Menudo ===
==== 1980s ====
In 1984, Cancel released his first solo recording, the pop rock single entitled "Fun Fun Fun Fun" (English/Spanish). The single was produced and written by Doug Fieger, lead singer of The Knack, and issued on Cancel's newly formed independent label, Miguel Enterprises.

==== El Reencuentro ====
In 1998, Cancel was recruited by his ex bandmate Ray Reyes while he worked in the kitchen of a fast food restaurant in the suburbs of Los Angeles to join El Reencuentro, a group consisting of former Menudo members. The band recorded and issued an album of previously released Menudo songs and toured throughout the world in promotion of the album.

==== 2000s-present ====
In 2003, Cancel became a police officer of the Coral Gables, Florida Police Department. In December 2004, he was ejected from the back seat of a Coral Gables police van resulting in the loss of two fingers from his left hand.

Cancel currently lives in Miami, Florida, with his family. He has 4 children Sasha Cancel, Izabella Cancel, Miguel Cancel, Jr. and Mariangelik Cancel. Miguel Cancel Jr. (Miguel Cancel Gulliver) is a swimmer who has won medals in competition at the Florida High School Athletic Association level.

In 2012, Cancel announced that he would again be returning to the music industry as a solo artist, his first solo effort having been in 1984.

== In pop culture ==
Miguel, Johnny, Ricky, Rene, Xavier, Charlie, and Ray were members of a Latin American boy band. During that decade, they released songs including "Claridad", "Fuego", and "Súbete a mi moto".

Cancel is played by Mauro Hernandez in the 2020 Amazon Prime Video series based on Menudo, Súbete A Mi Moto.

== Discography ==
=== With Menudo ===
- Fuego (1981)
- Xanadu (1981)
- Quiero Ser (1981)
- Por Amor (1982)
- Una aventura llamada Menudo (1982)
- Feliz Navidad (1982)
- Adios Miguel (1983)

== See also ==
- List of Puerto Ricans
- List of Menudo members
