= Una aventura llamada Menudo =

1982 film by Orestes Trucco

- Directed by: Orestes Trucco
- Produced by: Jorge Garcia
- Starring: Alondra; Ricky Meléndez; Charlie Massó; Johnny Lozada; Miguel Cancel; Xavier Serbiá; Gladys Rodriguez; Ed Trucco
- Cinematography: Héctor Collodoro
- Edited by: Perfecto Orellano
- Release date: 1982
- Running time: 90 minutes
- Country: Puerto Rico
- Language: Spanish

Una aventura llamada Menudo (English: An Adventure Called Menudo) is a 1982 film featuring teen boy band Menudo and Puerto Rican actress Gladys Rodríguez. The film's soundtrack received a nomination for a Grammy Award for Best Latin Pop Album.

== Synopsis ==
In Una aventura llamada Menudo, Menudo members are supposed to fly to Ponce, Puerto Rico for a concert. However, having before arrived at concert sites by way of airplane, helicopter, and fire truck, and deciding during a meeting that arriving by motorcycle would be too dangerous due to wild crowds, band member Ricky Meléndez then hires the services of a hot air balloon company, and during their balloon flight to the concert site, they have trouble and crash-land on a beach near a mansion.

Rodríguez's character, a big fan of Menudo who feels old and put aside by her young, hip nieces, lives in that mansion, along with her girls.

Looking for help, the Menudo guys arrive at the house, where they are given food and a room while they try to get in contact with their group director.

As the story develops, Menudo member Johnny Lozada falls in love with one of the girl residents, and Menudo members meet new friends, sing and dance their way through the story.

== Soundtrack album ==
Una aventura llamada Menudo

Soundtrack album by Menudo
- Released: 1982
- Genres: Latin Pop, Pop rock
- Label: PADOSA
- Producers: Alejandro Monroy, Carlos Villa, Edgardo Díaz

Menudo chronology
Por Amor (1982)	Una aventura llamada Menudo (1982)	Adios Miguel (1982)

A Spanish language soundtrack album with the same title as the film was released in 1982. This is the eleventh album overall and the second album this line-up recorded together. The album was nominated for a Grammy Award for Best Latin Pop Performance. The album was released in CD format in 1998. According to Billboard, its first-week sales reached 10,000 units, alongside the combined sales of Quiero Ser, Por Amor and Fuego. The group received a gold certification for the biggest selling Latin America record in United States, "A Volar".

=== Tracks ===
No.	Title	Writer(s)	Singer(s)	Length
1.	"A Volar"	Alejandro Monroy, Carlos Villa, Edgardo Díaz	Miguel Cancel	3:38
2.	"Señora Mia"	Monroy; Villa; Díaz	Johnny Lozada	3:50
3.	"Lluvia"	Monroy; Villa; Díaz	Group	3:10
4.	"Clara"	Monroy; Villa	Johnny Lozada	3:34
5.	"Tu Te Imaginas"	Monroy; Villa; Díaz	Miguel Cancel	3:18
6.	"Dame Un Beso"	Monroy; Villa	Johnny Lozada	3:53
7.	"Coquí"	Monroy; Villa; Díaz	Charlie Massó	2:57
8.	"Cámbiale Las Pilas"	Monroy; Villa	Ricky Meléndez	3:34
9.	"Estrella Polar"	Monroy; Villa	Group	4:56
10.	"A Volar (Instrumental Version)"	Monroy; Villa; Díaz		4:13

"Mi Banda Toca Rock", "Súbete A Mi Moto" and "Quiero Rock" appear as background (incidental) music in the film but do not appear on the soundtrack album. Rene Farrait, a former member who had already exited the group when the movie was filmed, also appears incidentally on the background, on a poster "Señora Mia" had of Menudo's "Quiero Ser" album's cover, which had been released in 1981. This album also contains the last two songs this version of the group (Menudo had over 30 members during its history, always grouped as a quintet) recorded together as a whole with Lluvia and Estrella Polar.

=== Chart ===
Weekly chart performance for Una aventura llamada Menudo [CD]
Chart (1998)	Peak position
United States (Billboard Top Latin 50 Catalog)	5

== See also ==
Menudo: La Pelicula
