= Menudo: La Reunion =

Former Menudo members' reunion

Menudo: La Reunión
- Origin: Puerto Rico, Brazil
- Genres: Latin Pop
- Years active: 2005-2006
- Past members: Roy Rosselló; Sergio Blass; Raymond Acevedo; Rubén Gómez; Andy Blázquez; Caleb Avilés; Anthony Galindo

Menudo: La Reunion was a 2005 music project composed of former Menudo members, from various incarnations of the boy band.

== History ==
Following in the footsteps of El Reencuentro and Los Ultimos Heroes (both Menudo reunion groups) Roy Rossello, Raymond Acevedo, Sergio Blass, Rubén Gómez and Andy Blázquez reunited to form Menudo: La Reunion. The project revolved mostly around a planned tour of Brazil, where Menudo had a large fan base during the early-mid 1980s. A tour and album was planned. However, due to an earlier contract commitment Sergio left the project in order tour with Los Ultimos Heroes in their last tour, and was replaced with Anthony Galindo.

The group made TV appearances and even recorded a demo & video of new version of 'Sabes a Chocolate'—with a more reggaeton-hip/hop beat. The group later replaced Andy Blasquez with former Euphoria member MDO Caleb Avilés before disbanding by late 2005 or early 2006.

Years later Ruben Gomez and Anthony Galindo reunited as a new duo called Blacksheep and sang and performed primarily in the Brazil area. Later, Anthony Galindo joined and toured with Los Super Reyes. MDO reunited in 2018.
