= Angelo Garcia =

American singer (born 1976)

Angelo García
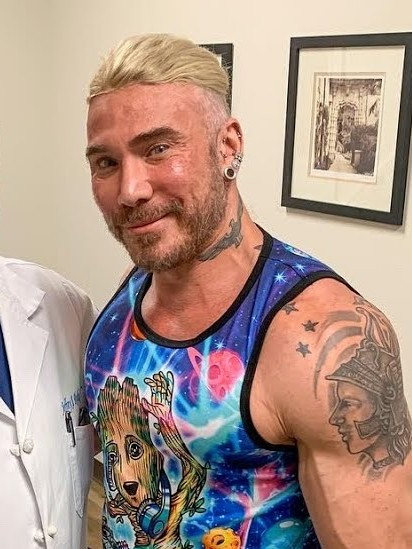
- García in 2022

Background information
- Born: Angel Luis García Ramos; March 28, 1976 (age 50); Brooklyn, New York, U.S.
- Genres: Pop, dance
- Occupations: Singer, songwriter
- Years active: 1980s–1990
- Formerly of: Menudo

Angelo Garcia (born March 28, 1976) is an American singer of who was a member of Puerto Rican boy band Menudo from 1988 to 1990.

== Career ==
A native New Yorker born in Brooklyn, New York, he barely spoke Spanish when he auditioned for a spot in the band Menudo after seeing a television commercial in Puerto Rico during a family vacation.

After two years with Menudo, García parted with the band and signed with World Wide Entertainment. As a solo artist he recorded several songs including "Magic", "Yours So Completely", and a remake of singer Tiffany's hit song "Could've Been" but it was his single "Don't Keep Me Holding On" (written and produced by Lewis Martineé of Exposé fame) that became a success. In 1992, World Wide Entertainment sold García's recording contract to Warner Bros. Records for an undisclosed amount.

After parting with his former label, he released one semi-successful Spanish-language album for Warner simply titled Angelo. After completing his secondary education and some music projects, he put his recording career on hold after he moved to Orlando, Florida, where he earned a communications degree from the University of Central Florida. After completing his studies, he helped in the launch of a women's gym franchise in Miami named Elements, then returned to New York City to restart his musical career.

Since 2004, García has written a number of original songs in both Spanish and English. During 2005, he participated in a reunion tour of former Menudo members Sergio Blass, Rawy Torres, and Robert Avellanet, performing under the name Los Ultimos Heroes. In order to preserve his artistic independence and avoid a clichéd reworking of the Menudo sound, García instead recorded a solo album.

In 2006, García released a Spanish-language pop album titled Cool for which he wrote or co-wrote every song. One of the singles from Cool, a ballad titled "Entregaré" (also known as "Si Es Así"), which García co-wrote with songwriter Roy Tavare, was featured in the 2006 motion picture Yellow.

In 2012, García began recording material for an English-language album.

In May 2010, García posed for a series of semi-nude photographs for Paragon Men, a gay erotica website. In the interview which accompanied his photo shoot, Garcia openly discussed his homosexuality and his years of sexual self-exploration after leaving Menudo, even working briefly as a stripper and erotic dancer and performing at the Gaiety Theatre in New York City. He also refused to out his former bandmate Ricky Martin, who publicly disclosed his homosexuality a few weeks after García's interview. In 2012, Garcia joined forces with William Luque (who wrote his first Spanish hit "En Mis Sueños" which sold over 6 million copies worldwide) and began writing and recording a new English language dance-pop album in Madrid called Scandalous. The title track "Scandalous" speaks about a child growing up in the spotlight and how having to grow up prematurely wreaked havoc on his adult life.

On May 7, 2015 Angelo Garcia disclosed in an exclusive interview on the Dr. Zoe Today show that he was sexually abused by a neighbor at age 8, by someone close to administration while in Menudo from ages 11 to 14, and again by a schoolteacher after he left the band. Inspired by the overwhelming response to his interview, the show opened its toll free number for listeners to share their stories of sexual abuse and aired them on the following show titled "Breaking the Silence" on May 14, 2015.

== Personal life ==
Garcia is openly gay, and has stated that he came out in his late teens.

== Legacy ==
Toti Willy, singer of Mexican children's pop group Micro Chips, has stated that she wrote the group's song "Angello" when she was about seven years old, as a dedication to Angelo Garcia. (in Spanish)

== Discography ==
=== With Menudo ===
- Sons of Rock (1988)
- Sombras y Figuras (1988)
- Los ultimos Heroes (1989)
