= Fuego (Menudo album) =

Studio album by Menudo
- Released: 1981
- Studio: Estudio Torres Sonido (Madrid, Spain)
- Genre: Latin Pop
- Label: Colibri
- Producer: Edgardo Diaz

Menudo chronology
Es Navidad (1980)	Fuego (1981)	Xanadu (1981)

Menudo is the seventh studio album by the Puerto Rican boy band Menudo, released in 1981 by the Padosa record label. It was later the same year, reissued as Fuego (Fire) featuring a new cover that introduced Miguel Cancel as his replacement.

The album was promoted through television appearances and an international tour across the Americas. The title track "Fuego" achieved notable success in several Latin American countries, while the album itself performed strongly on international charts and reached significant sales milestones, particularly in Venezuela and Mexico, becoming one of the group's early commercial breakthroughs.

== Background and release ==
The album was first released under the title Menudo, featuring brothers Oscar and Ricky Meléndez, along with René Farrait, Johnny Lozada and Xavier Serbiá; it was the second album recorded by this line-up. This release marked Oscar Meléndez's final appearance with the group, as he reached Menudo's age limit of 15 in early 1981 and was subsequently replaced by Miguel Cancel. The album was later reissued as Fuego, featuring a new cover that included Cancel.

== Promotion ==
To promote the album, the group made appearances on television programs, such as Siempre en Domingo in Mexico with Raúl Velasco, as well as their own program on Channel 52 in California. In Venezuela, they received the "Meridiano de Oro" award for being the most popular singers on Channel 81. A tour was held, covering countries such as the United States (Washington, Los Angeles), Mexico, Colombia, Venezuela, Peru, Argentina, and Uruguay.

"Fuego" was released as a single and serves as the title track for the international version of the album. With this song, the group achieved success in Venezuela and other countries across Latin America. The track was initially recorded in 1978 for the album Laura, but it was the 1981 album version that gained popularity. In Mexico, the single reached the top position twice on the music chart of the Mexican biweekly magazine Notitas Musicales.

== Commercial performance ==
Commercially, the album became a success, reaching the top positions on music charts in the United States and Argentina. In Venezuela, sales reached 143,000 copies. According to a 1981 report from Record World, each Menudo album released in Mexico until that date (the other being Quiero Ser, also from 1981) managed to sell half a million copies across LPs and cassettes.

In 1998, the album was released on compact disc (CD) format. According to Billboard magazine, the combined sales of this album along with the CDs of Quiero Ser, Por Amor, and Una Aventura Llamada Menudo reached 10,000 units just in the first week.

== Track listing ==
No.	Title	Writer(s)	Singer(s)	Length
1.	"Fuego"	Leyda E. Colón	Group	3:37
2.	"El Momento Del Adiós"	Socorro Centeno	Johnny Lozada	2:42
3.	"Doña Tecla"	Socorro Centeno	Óscar Melendez, Ricky Meléndez	3:21
4.	"Madre"	Juan Carlos Calderón	René Farrait	4:16
5.	"Llegas Tú"	Leyda E. Colón	Group	2:36
6.	"A Bailar"	Joaquín Torres Méndez	René Farrait	2:49
7.	"El Ayer"	Socorro Centeno	René Farrait	2:38
8.	"Isolé"	Leyda E. Colón	Group	3:24
9.	"De Tu Vuelo"	Alejandro Monroy, Edgardo Díaz	Group	3:16
10.	"Sueños"	Pedro José Herrero	René Farrait	2:55

== Charts ==
Weekly chart performance for Fuego
Chart (1983)	Peak position
Argentina (Record World / Prensario)	6
United States (Billboard Top Latin Albums - Los Angeles / (Pop))	7
United States (Billboard Top Latin Albums - California / (Pop))	23
United States (Record World - East Coast)	39
United States (Record World - West Coast)	26
Mexico (Record World / Ventas)	1
Mexico (Record World / Popularidad)	2

Weekly chart performance for Fuego [CD]
Chart (1998)	Peak position
United States (Billboard Top Latin 50 Catalog)	6

== Certifications and sales ==
Region	Certification	Estimated sales
Venezuela	Gold	143,000
