= Charlie Masso =

Puerto Rican-Mexican singer

- Born: June 13, 1969 (age 57); San Juan, Puerto Rico
- Occupations: Singer, Actor

Carlos Javier Rivera Massó (born June 13, 1969 in San Juan, Puerto Rico), better known as Charlie Massó, is a Puerto Rican-Mexican singer and actor. Massó is a former member of Menudo, joining the band at the height of Menudo's worldwide fame. He replaced Rene Farrait and quickly became a fan favorite with his participation on the albums of Por Amor and Una Aventura Llamada Menudo, which was the name of both Menudo's second movie and of the soundtrack album for it. Charlie recorded 14 albums with Menudo, two were nominated for a Grammy Award for Best Latin Pop Album in 1984 and 85.

== Career ==
Massó began his life as a Menudo the very moment that one of Menudo's members of the group's "golden era," Farrait, left the group. However, Massó's presence helped extend the golden era an additional three years, and when he left the group in 1987, he was the last member of the group's golden years to leave. Massó was a member of Menudo during their most commercially successful period in the States, which included the group's highest-charting U.S. single, "Hold Me" (#62 on the Billboard Hot 100.) Massó's bandmates included Xavier Serbiá, Johnny Lozada, Ricky Meléndez, Miguel Cancel, Ray Reyes, Roy Rosselló, Robby Rosa and Ricky Martin, among others. He returned to Menudo to complete a tour in Brazil, their 1987 Summer in the Streets tour, after Robby Rosa quit the group, to introduce new member Ruben Gomez and for their last tour in the Philippines when Ralphy Rodriguez was pulled out of the group by his parents late that year.

In 1985 Menudo visited Manila, Philippines twice for their concert at the Folk Arts Theater, with several guest appearances on Eat Bulaga, Vilma in Person & GMA Supershow. Menudo's popularity in Philippines was helped with their fluency in many languages. This was expressed in Spanish, English and Filipino songs. During 1985 Charlie sang " Di Na Natuto", a Tagalog song to serenade a young Filipina originally sung by Gary Valenciano. Charlie's duet with Lea Salonga, "I Still Believe" was a big hit in 1988-89.

Charlie left the band in 1987, being replaced by Ralphy Rodriguez, though Masso will remain in the group to fill in if members were unable to sing, including Rodriguez himself as he departed the group months later and Massó filled in the spot for him. After the tour, Massó moved to Mexico for many years, where he showcased his acting in soap operas. Massó obtained Mexican citizenship and began a career as a soloist, recording three albums. He became married and had a family. In 1998 he was recruited by bandmate Ray Reyes while singing with a merengue orquesta, Grupo KAOS, and joined Meléndez, Farrait, Lozada, Reyes and Cancel in touring many of the places where they had acquired millions of fans as Menudos, with El Reencuentro.

In 2001 he appeared in 12 Horas, a Puerto Rican movie written and directed by Raúl Marchand Sánchez.

Massó quit El Reencuentro during 2015 and joined Farrait, Cancel and Reyes in another Menudo-reunion band they named "Menudomania Forever".

== Songs ==
=== 1982 ===
- "La Chispa De La Vida"
- "Coqui"

=== 1983 ===
- "Indianapolis" (in Spanish)
- "Piel De Manzana"
- "Todo Va Bien"
- "No Te Reprimas"

=== 1984 ===
- "Heavenly Angel" (English version of "Piel de Manzana")
- "Nao Se Reprima" (Portuguese version of "No Te Reprimas")
- "Tudo Vai Bem" (Portuguese version of "Todo Va Bien")
- "Indianapolis" (in Portuguese)
- "Yo Sere Tu Bailarin"
- "Amor Primero"
- "Agua De Limon"

=== 1985 ===
- "Come Home" (duet with Robi Rosa),
- "When I Dance With You" (English version of "Yo Sere Tu Bailarin")
- "Acercate"
- "Viva! Bravo!" (in Spanish)
- "Viva! Bravo!" (in Portuguese)
- "Vem Por Favor" (Portuguese version of "Acercate")

=== 1986 ===
- "Viva! Bravo!" (in Italian)
- "Il Primo Amore" (Italian version of "Amor Primero")
- "Vivi La Vita" (Italian version of "No Te Reprimas")
- "Vicino A Te" (Italian version of "Acercate")
- "Salta La Valla"
- "A Cara O Cruz" (duet with Robi Rosa)
- "Jumpin' Over" (English version of "Salta La Valla")
- "Cara ou Coroa" (Portuguese version of "A Cara O Cruz")
- "Alegria" (Portuguese version only

1988-89 with Lea Salonga "I Still Believe"

=== El Reencuentro 1998 ===
- El Recuentro (live concert album with ex-Menudo members)

=== Solo career ===
- 1988 Charlie Masso (Melody Mexico)
- 1989 Sin Ti (Melody Mexico)
- 1993 Inevitable (Sony Music Mexico)
- 2002 Tributo al príncipe

== Personal ==
Masso has two sons, Charlie Jr. and Angel.

== See also ==
- List of Puerto Ricans
- List of Mexicans
