= El Reencuentro =

Boy band Menudo's comeback concert

- Origin: Puerto Rico
- Genre: Pop rock
- Years active: 1998-2015
- Label: Fonovisa
- Spinoff of: Menudo
- Past members: Ricky Meléndez; Ray Reyes; Johnny Lozada; Miguel Cancel; René Farrait; Charlie Massó

El Reencuentro was the name that six former members of musical group Menudo used for their comeback project. Ricky Melendez, Rene Farrait, Miguel Cancel, Johnny Lozada, Ray Reyes, and Charlie Masso re-joined to celebrate the 15th anniversary of their success in Latin America, North America, Spain and several other countries. They started in 1998 as an experimental project and had an unexpected success that continued until 2015 through North and Latin America.

== History ==
=== 1998 ===
In the late 90's, former members of Menudo reunited for a radio special in Sistema 102, a local Puerto Rican radio station. Hundreds of fans gathered outside the radio station that night and the idea kicked off for a one-time concert to be held at the Centro de Bellas Artes in Santurce.

Ray Reyes began contacting Ricky Meléndez, Johnny Lozada, René Farrait, Miguel Cancel, Charlie Massó and Xavier Serbiá, with Xavier being the only member to decline. Despite the idea of having a concert at Centro de Bellas Artes, response was so big that the band had to move the concert to Coliseo Roberto Clemente. Tickets were sold out in less than an hour, so it ended up being three consecutive concerts in San Juan and a tour around America.

The band got a million-dollar record contract with Fonovisa Records that distributed their gold-selling live album El Reencuentro: 15 Años Después.

=== 2005-Present ===
After the 1998 concert, the band didn't reunite until 2005. The band continued to reunite sporadically during the late 2000s. In 2010, they performed in Hato Rey, Puerto Rico.

Following the 2010 Haiti Earthquake, the group released a single titled "Amistad" to raise funds. This was the first and only time that the group released original material. The track was written by Omar Alfanno and Roberto Sueiro with Miguel Cancel and Charlie Massó providing lead vocals.

On August 25, 2015, El Reencuentro announced that they would no longer perform. Already slated shows were canceled and Lozada apologized to fans saying the issue had been over the timing of payment for the band's performances.

During 2015, Masso, Farrait, Reyes and Cancel went back on tour, this time under the name 'Menudomania Forever'. They were joined by 13 other Menudo members from different eras, including Robert Avellanet, Jonathan Montenegro and Rawy Torres.

In 2019, Melendez, Lozada, Cancel, Reyes, and Farrait reconciled and began performing together again under the name Menudo but without Masso due to disagreements between Lozada and Masso. In September 2019 their "Subete a Mi Moto Tour" began in their native Puerto Rico and spread internationally.

Reyes died on April 30, 2021, of an apparent heart attack. He was 51.

== Discography ==
=== Albums ===
Title	Details	Chart positions		
Title	Details	US		
Title	Details	200	Latin	Latin Pop
El Reencuentro: 15 Años Después	Released: 1998; Label: Fonovisa; Formats: CD	—	7	—

=== Singles ===
Year	Title	Album
1998	"Quiero Ser"	El Reencuentro: 15 Años Después
1998	"A Volar"	El Reencuentro: 15 Años Después
1998	"Claridad"	El Reencuentro: 15 Años Después
1998	"Dulces Besos"	El Reencuentro: 15 Años Después
2010	"Amistad"	Non-album Single

== See also ==
- Proyecto M
