= Chiquitita (album) =

Studio album by Menudo
- Released: July 1, 1979
- Studio: Estudio Torres Sonido, Madrid, Spain
- Genre: Latin pop
- Label: Padosa, Inc.

Menudo chronology
Laura (1978)	Chiquitita (1979)	Felicidades! (1979)

Chiquitita (released in Puerto Rico as Menudo) is Menudo's third Spanish album, released in 1979, this time featuring brothers Carlos, Óscar and Ricky Meléndez (aged 14, 13, and 11 respectively), Fernando Sallaberry (14), and new member René Farrait (12). René replaced Nefty Sallaberry after Nefty reached the age limit set by Menudo management.

In 1979, the quintet had already established itself as a successful act in its homeland, Puerto Rico. Songs from their previous albums managed to chart in countries like the Dominican Republic.

== Promotion ==
To promote the new album, the group traveled to Venezuela twelve times without receiving payment. This led to substantial success: with the single "Chiquitita," a cover version of one of the best-known songs by the Swedish group ABBA, they achieved commercial success in the country.

== Critical reception ==
The specialized music critics also responded positively. In the column of the Colombian newspaper El Tiempo, on October 10, 1979, the critic recommended the album Chiquitita, as a tribute to the country's Children's Month, noting that the quintet had significant qualities as performers.

== Commercial performance ==
In Puerto Rico, the album Menudo earned the quintet its first gold record for its impressive sales.

== Track listing ==
No.	Title	Writer(s)	Lead Vocals	Length
1.	"Ella-a-a"	H. Herrero, J. Seijas, L. G. Escobar	Group
2.	"Sólo Tu Amor"	Edgardo Diaz, Celi Bee	René Farrait
3.	"Doña Tecla"	Socorro Centeno	Óscar and Ricky Meléndez
4.	"Mi Mejor Amiga"	S. Centeno	Fernando Sallaberry
5.	"Voy A América"	J. Seijas, E. Guerín, C. Villa	René Farrait
6.	"Chiquitita"	Björn Ulvaeus, Benny Andersson	Fernando Sallaberry, Carlos Meléndez
7.	"Sueños"	Pedro Herrero	Carlos Meléndez
8.	"De Tu Vuelo"	Alejandro Monroy, E. Diaz	Group
9.	"Soy Natural"	E. Diaz	Group
10.	"Voulez-Vous"	B. Ulvaeus, B. Andersson, E. Diaz	Group

== Certifications ==
Region	Certification
Puerto Rico	Gold
