= Menudo: La Película =

1982 Puerto Rican-Venezuelan film

- Film poster
- Directed by: Alfredo Anzola
- Release date: 1982
- Country: Venezuela
- Language: Spanish

Menudo: La Película is a 1982 Puerto Rican-Venezuelan film production featuring Puerto Rican boy band Menudo. The film was filmed entirely in Venezuela. It was directed by Alfredo Anzola. Marisela Buitrago also acts in the film.

== Plot ==
Puerto Rican music band Menudo is in Venezuela for a country-wide tour. They arrive in Venezuela prepared to visit some of that country's largest cities and re-acquaint themselves with Venezuelan fans. As the five members of the band, René Farrait, Xavier Serbiá, Ricky Meléndez, Johnny Lozada and Miguel Cancel, travel during this tour, they face different personal situations: Lozada hopes for a Puerto Rican girl whom he fell in love with to show up in Venezuela in time to spend time with him, Serbiá befriends the daughter (played by actress Thais Gomez) of the local tour manager, Meléndez develops a throat infection during the tour and gets stranded in a hotel room by doctor's orders, then leaves the hotel to perform at a concert, and the band gets lost in a desert area, later being rescued by an Arabian businessman. They also spend time meeting the locals in charge of their tour and swimming and playing at a hotel swimming pool.

These scenes are interlaced with scenes from a concert, in which the band sings some of its hits, including Subéte A Mi Moto and Quiero Ser, and Spanish versions of some of Abba's and Kiss hits.

Lozada's girlfriend arrives in Caracas just in time for them to spend a couple of days together, Xavier and his female friend decide to remain friends, and the group returns to Puerto Rico after a successful tour.

== Film locations ==
The film's concert scenes were recorded during one concert that was held at Mérida's bullring, while the other scenes were recorded at a Caracas hotel and in different areas of the country.

Simón Bolívar International Airport at Maiquetía is also one of the places where scenes were filmed, particularly the film's ending scene where Lozada's girlfriend and another girl board a Viasa flight towards San Juan.

== See also ==
- Una Aventura Llamada Menudo
