= Johnny Lozada =

Puerto Rican actor and singer (born 1967)

- Born: Johnny Lozada Correa; December 21, 1967 (age 58); Caguas, Puerto Rico
- Occupations: TV host, actor, singer (1980—1990,1998—2015)
- Years active: 1980–present
- Spouse: Sandy Meléndez

Johnny Lozada Correa (born December 21, 1967) is a Puerto Rican singer, actor, host, and television personality.

Lozada was a member of Puerto Rican boy band Menudo during its golden years, joining the group in 1980 and staying until early 1984. After leaving Menudo, he formed the singing group Proyecto M with Rene Farrait and Xavier Serbiá, who were, like him, Menudo alumni. After the dissolving of Proyecto M, Lozada took on acting participating in several Latin telenovelas. In 1998, Lozada and other former members of Menudo received an invitation from Ray Reyes and formed El Reencuentro, to reminisce the years they had spent with Menudo. The concerts proved to be a success, and the tours extended for several years.

In 2010, Lozada joined Sal y Pimienta, a Latin gossip show, as a commentator. After two years, he left the show to host ¡Despierta América!.

== Family and early life ==
Johnny Lozada Correa was born in Caguas, Puerto Rico, at the San Rafael Clinic. He is the only son of Ramón Lozada and Aracelis "Celita" Correa.

== Recording and acting career ==
=== Menudo: 1979—1984 ===
Lozada joined Menudo at the end of 1979, replacing original member Carlos Meléndez. Lozada spent the next four years with the group. During that time, he participated in albums like Más, Mucho Más (1980), Fuego (1981), Quiero Ser (1981), Por Amor (1982), and A Todo Rock (1983), among others. He also starred in the telenovelas Quiero Ser and Es por Amor, both based on the group. Finally, Lozada acted in the films Menudo: La Película and Una Aventura Llamada Menudo.

During this time, the group enjoyed success in all of America. According to creator, Edgardo Díaz, this installment of the group "opened a lot of doors in Latin America, and was very strong". Among their achievements are four sold-out concerts at the Madison Square Garden in 1983, and record-breaking concerts in Brazil with an audience of 200,000 in São Paulo and 100,000 in Rio de Janeiro and Belo Horizonte.

Lozada was considered the most emotional of the group, and his hits with the group included the classic "Clara", "Mi Banda Toca Rock", "Lady" and "Señora Mia".

=== Solo career and Proyecto M ===
In 1984, Lozada turned 16 and left Menudo, as was usual among its members. He was replaced by Robi Rosa. A farewell concert was held at the Radio City Music Hall in New York City.

Lozada was signed by RCA and recorded two solo albums: Johnny and Invítame. This last album was nominated for Best Latin Pop Album at the 27th Grammy Awards, alongside José Feliciano, Plácido Domingo, José José, María Conchita Alonso, and Menudo themselves.

In 1986, Lozada participated in a campaign to encourage youth abstinence from sex, in which he recorded two duets ("Cuando Estemos Juntos" and "Détente") with Tatiana and music videos for them. This received much publicity in Latin America and even in the United States, where it was the subject of a report by John Stossel on 20/20.

That year also, Lozada participated alongside the Puerto Rico national basketball team (joining such stars as Jose Ortiz, Ruben Rodriguez, Federico Fico Lopez and Angelo Cruz among others) as well as Rafael Jose, Magali Carrasquillo, Kobbo Santarrosa, Jaime Bello, and others in a song named "Yo Voy a Mi", for which a CD and musical video were produced, in order to boost the basketball team's games' attendance numbers as it headed to the 1987 Pre-Olympic tournament in Uruguay and, later on, to the 1988 Olympic Games in South Korea.

In 1987, Lozada joined former Menudo alumni Rene Farrait and Xavier Serbiá in the singing group Proyecto M (Lozada and Farrait were later joined at Proyecto M by Lozada's former bandmate at Menudo, Ray Reyes). The group enjoyed some success in Latin America, and was invited to participate in the telenovela Alba Marina, alongside Venezuelan singer Karina. The group was together for 8 years and recorded four albums, during which Serbiá left and was replaced by Ray Reyes.

=== Acting career and El Reencuentro ===
After leaving Proyecto M, Lozada began acting participating in telenovelas like Señora Tentación and Escándalo. In 2001, he played boxer Johnny Trinidad in the Amigas y rivales telenovela with Televisa. The next year, he starred in Cómplices al Rescate as veterinarian Sebastián. He also acted in the play Solo para Mujeres, and in the third season of Big Brother VIP.

In 1998, Lozada and former Menudo members Rene Farrait, Miguel Cancel, Ray Reyes, Charlie Masso and Ricky Meléndez got together in Puerto Rico for a concert named El Reencuentro, with dedication to the convalescing ex-Menudo Fernando Sallaberry, Menudo's original lead singer, who was unable to join the reunion due to health issues. The concert featured new renditions of their hits from Menudo. El Reencuentro was so successful that they needed to add two more concerts that weekend and later, they went on tour all over Latin America and the United States. The group toured frequently until 2015, when they broke up.

=== Television host ===
Lozada continued to tour with El Reencuentro until 2015, as well as acting in theater. He has worked in the comedy Al Aire and the play Manos Quietas. In 2012, he joined the cast of Confesiones del Pene.

In 2010, Lozada joined Sal y Pimienta, a Latin gossip show, as commentator. After two years, he left the show to host ¡Despierta América!. In December 2016, Lozada announced that he would be leaving ¡Despierta América!. In February 2017, he joined the cast of the children's reality/talent show Pequeños Gigantes USA as a celebrity captain. The group that Lozada coached, "Peque Flow", won the competition. On July 30, 2018, Lozada joined the Puerto Rican gossip show Lo Se Todo, replacing long time host Pedro Juan Figueroa. Lozada left "Lo Se Todo" in January 2019.

As of October 30, 2023, Lozada is a co-host of the morning talk/variety show En La Mañana on WLII-DT (TeleOnce).

== Mira Quien Baila ==
On November 24, 2013, Lozada won the fourth season of Univision's dance competition Mira Quien Baila. The judge panel for this season was composed by Horacio Villalobos, Bianca Marroquin and Ninel Conde. Lozada began his participation in the contest by winning the first gala, earning 66% of the public vote. The following week he defeated El Dasa in a duel, receiving 76%. On September 29, 2013, Lozada was forced to dance twice, after a regional Mexican routine failed to convince the judges. He avoided the elimination round by advancing with a tango in his second routine. Throughout the season he was disfavored by the all-Mexican jury, even being involved in controversy when his masculinity was questioned by Conde following the regional Mexican routine. Lozada remained diplomatic to the attack, but his wife did respond. The following week he danced to La Isla Bonita, remaining in the winner's circle. The fifth date did not feature eliminations from the previous gala, but Lozada avoided being nominated to the elimination round with a cha-cha-cha. This was followed by another direct classification with a pasodoble.

At the seventh gala, Lozada fell into the elimination round for the first time, following an urban routine. In the eight date, he performed a disco routine and survived the jury's nomination to the elimination round by besting Manny Manuel with 62% of the vote. During the voting process, his nomination became a trending topic in several countries. At the ninth gala, Lozada danced a quickstep, being sent into a single-elimination qualificatory to the finals. At the semifinals, he danced a merengue and advanced by eliminating Mane de la Parra, who only gathered 35% despite receiving the public endorsement of Conde. Despite publicly supporting his opponent, Conde did not congratulate Lozada or react following his elimination. He suffered a slight muscle torn in his right arm during this gala, but was treated with injections and decided to continue. With two tangos in the finals, Lozada defeated Marjorie de Sousa and Pedro Moreno by gathering 53% of the total vote. He donated the $50,000 prize to Habitat for Humanity's Puerto Rico chapter.

Four years later, Lozada returned to the show as one of the judges for season five along with Roselyn Sanchez and Javier Castillo.

== Personal life ==
Lozada is married to Sandy Meléndez. They have three children together: Natalia, Thalía, and Jahn Gabriel. Lozada also has an adopted son, Felipe.

== Actor ==
- 2007: Manuela and Manuel Ramon
- 2006: I Love Miami Carlitos
- 2004: Misión S.O.S (TV series) Gonzalo Ortega – Episode #1.1 (2004) ... Gonzalo Ortega
- 2002: Cómplices Al Rescate (TV series) Sebastián Solasi
- 2001: Amigas y rivales (TV series) Johnny Trinidad
- 1995: Señora Tentacion (TV series)
- 1988: Alba marina (TV series) (as Proyecto M)
- 1983: Silver Spoons (TV series) – Menudo Madness (1983) ... Johnny
- 1982: Una aventura llamada Menudo Johnny
- 1982: Menudo: La Pelicula Johnny

== In pop culture ==
Lozada is played by Leonel Otero in the 2020 Amazon Prime Video series based on Menudo, "Subete A Mi Moto".

== See also ==
- List of Puerto Ricans
