= Menudo (group) =

Puerto Rican boy band

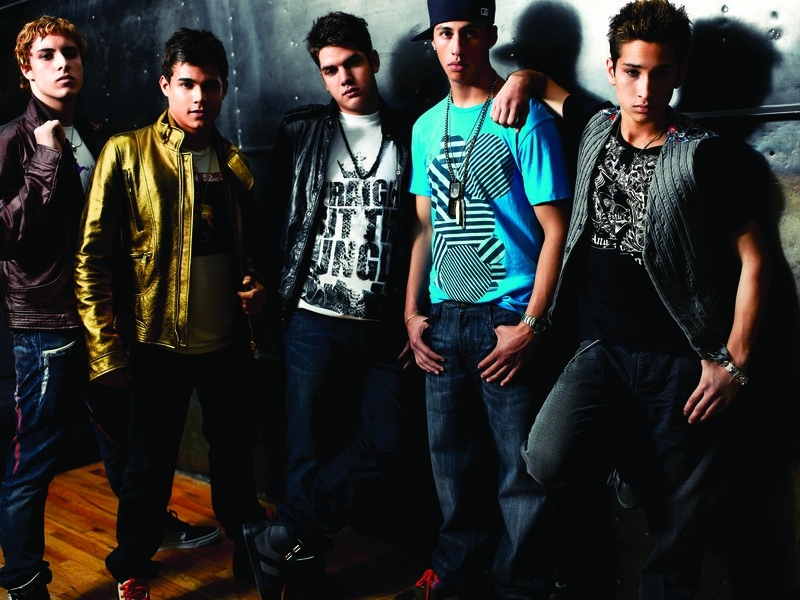
- 2007–2009 lineup. L–R: José Bordonada Collazo, Monti Montañez (Che Antonio), Emmanuel Vélez Pagan, Carlos Olivero, Chris Moy

Background information
- Origin: Puerto Rico
- Genres: Latin Pop; Pop Rock; Rock
- Years active: 1977–2009; 2015–2021; 2022–present
- Labels: Padosa; Sonográfica; RCA; McGillis; Blue Dog; Sony; Universal
- Spinoffs: MDO
- Members: Zaulo Echautegui; Janvier Flores; Alejandro Querales; Gabriel Rossell; Andrés Pirela
- Past members: Ricky Martin; Ruben Gómez; Robert Avellanet; Sergio Blass; Angelo García; Daniel René Weider

Menudo is a Puerto Rican boy band formed by producer Edgardo Díaz. Referred to as the "most iconic Latino pop music band", they have been ranked as one of the biggest boy bands of all time by several publications, including Billboard, Us Weekly, Seventeen, and Teen Vogue, being the only Latin band on their lists.

The band had several radio hits during its career. They acted in a television film (1979's Leyenda de Amor) and two feature films, An Adventure Called Menudo (Una aventura llamada Menudo) and Menudo: The Movie (Menudo: La Película), in three mini series entitled "I Want to Be", "It's for Love" and "Forever Friends" ("Quiero Ser", "Es Por Amor" and "Por Siempre Amigos") and another television mini-series named Panchito and Arturo (Panchito y Arturo).

Due to changes in puberty-related vocal range and timbre becoming permanent at around the age of 17, Menudo was distinctive in that members of the band were let go at that age, and younger vocalists took their place. In fact over the course of the band's history, it had run through more than fifty members, for this very reason. At any one time however, the Menudo band was usually, except for two isolated eras, composed of five male teenagers.

Menudo's original lineup consisted of five boys: brothers Fernando and Nefty Sallaberry (ages 12 and 13); the Melendez brothers, Carlos Meléndez, (age 12), Óscar Meléndez, (age 11), and Ricky Meléndez, (age 9); the latter three are Díaz's cousins. The band's golden-era lineup consisted of members Ricky Meléndez, Johnny Lozada, René Farrait, Miguel Cancel, Xavier Serbiá, Charlie Masso and Ray Reyes. It was also a starting point for popular international stars like Ricky Martin (1984–89) and Draco Rosa (1984–87), who were members of the band in the mid-1980s.

Entering the 1990s, their popularity started to wane amid allegations of drug use. In 1997, the rights and the name Menudo were sold. The remaining members continued to perform as MDO until their official disbandment in 2002. However, this iteration has continued to perform sporadically since. New management of Menudo formed a new line-up in 2007, releasing an EP but disbanding in 2009. Some of the members of the "golden era" of the band reunited in 1998 under the name El Reencuentro, and in 2019 for the "Súbete a Mi Moto" ("Get on My Motorcycle") Tour.

Menudo is estimated to have sold 20 million albums worldwide and has generated over 300 million US dollars.

== History ==
=== Beginning and rise to fame ===
Menudo was formed in 1977 by music producer Edgardo Díaz. The original line up consisted of 5 members, the Sallaberry brothers, Fernando and Nefty, and Díaz's cousins, the Melendez brothers, Oscar, Carlos, and Ricky. They were signed to Padosa Records and released their first album Los Fantasmas in 1977. It featured "Teach Me to Sing" ("Enséñame a cantar"), a song by Spanish singer Micky. In 1978 they released another album called Laura. Fifteen-year-old Nefty was the very first member to leave and was replaced by 12-year-old René Farrait. In 1979, they released an album called Little Girl (Chiquitita). At the end of 1979, Carlos left the band at age 15 and was replaced by 12-year-old Johnny Lozada, after which they made their first Christmas album, Congratulations ("Felicidades").

Menudo, c. 1981. (top) Miguel, Johnny, Xavier; (bottom) René and Ricky

In the early 1980s, Menudo had several hits, including "The Ghosts" ("Los Fantasmas") and a cover version of ABBA's "Do You Want" ("Voulez-Vous"). They filmed three music videos for the song "Little Girl" ("Chiquitita"), including one with Puerto Rican music star Ednita Nazario (who sang with them and played the titular "Chiquitita" on the video). The group then released several moderately successful albums, including Fuego (Fire), which yielded hits "Ella A-A" ("Her"), "Fuego" ("Fire"), and "A Bailar" ("To Dance"). They also made "Fui Hecho Para Amarte", which itself was also a cover, in that song's case of Kiss's '"I Was Made For Lovin' You", but that song was not included in Fuego, and was released on their Xanadu album instead. Producciones Padosa translated the popularity of the group into Menudo en apuros (1981), a chronicle series.

During 1981, the group, which by then consisted of René Farrait (14), Johnny Lozada (13), Xavier Serbiá (13), Miguel Cancel (13), and remaining original member Ricky Melendez (13), released "I Want to Be" ("Quiero Ser"). The album would launch Menudo into international stardom. It included hit songs such as "I Want to Be" ("Quiero Ser"), "Get on My Motorcycle" ("Súbete A Mi Moto"), "Rock on TV" ("Rock En La TV"), "Clarity" ("Claridad"), and "My Band Plays Rock" ("Mi Banda Toca Rock"). They also had their own telenovela series entitled I Want To Be (Quiero Ser).

In the same year, the group hosted a television show on Telemundo entitled Menudo Young People (Gente Joven de Menudo). They hosted a yearly beauty pageant, "Menudo's young girl" ("La chica joven de Menudo") and the winner of the pageant would sometimes appear in the band's videos or join them onstage at their concerts throughout the United States.

Menudo became very popular throughout Latin America, from Mexico to Argentina, and Brazil. They also became the first boy band to own their own private jet. Díaz, their manager, purchased a Lockheed JetStar that had belonged to American President Richard Nixon and the Shah of Iran. He had Menudo's name emblazoned on both sides of the fuselage. In 1982, Charlie Masso, then age 12, replaced René Farrait, age 14. Masso's first album with Menudo was "For Love" ("Por Amor"). During this boom of popularity, fans started calling themselves contagious to the "Menuditis", similar to Beatlemania and Bieber Fever, or the "Menudomania". They were so popular that they starred in their own feature films: Menudo: The Movie and An Adventure Called Menudo. Aventura starred Gladys Rodríguez as Miss Mia ("Señora Mía") and included songs such as "Clara" and "Fly" ("A Volar").

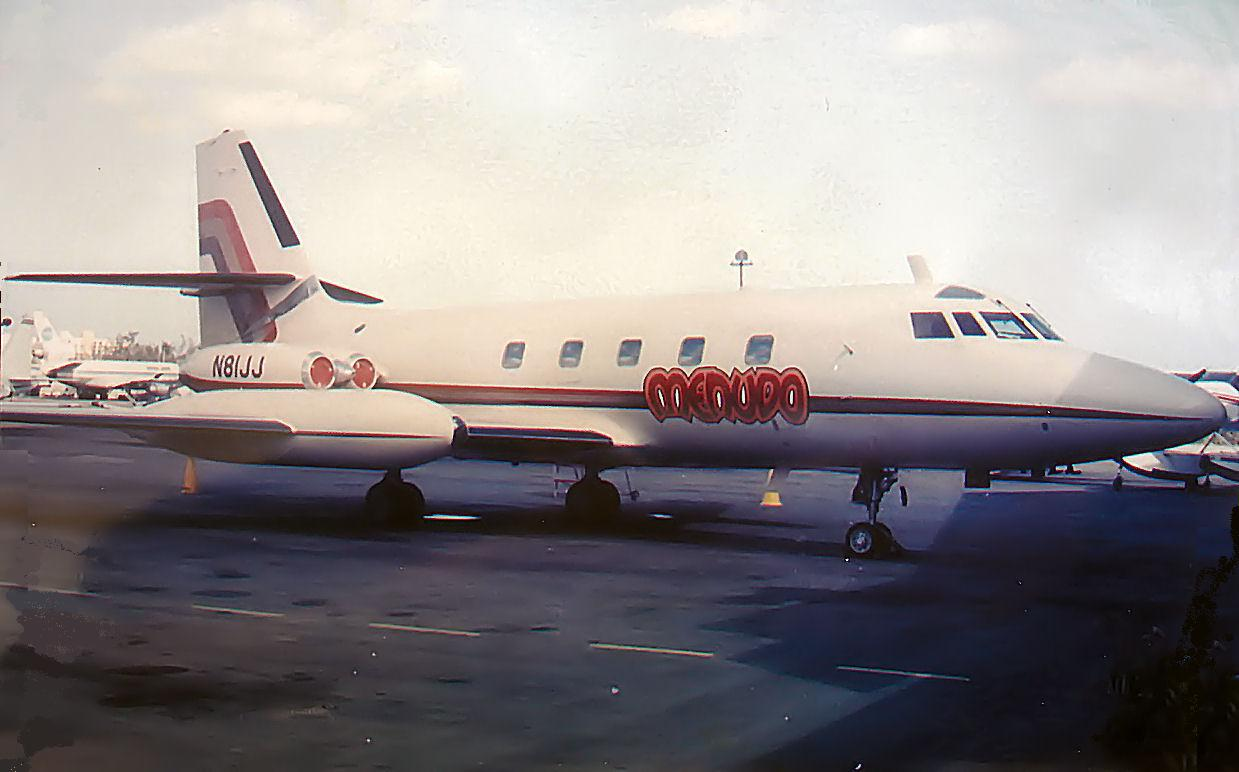
Menudo's Lockheed L-1329 JetStar jet

During their first visit to New York in early 1983, Ray Reyes, 12, replaced Xavier Serbiá, 14. Their American fanbase grew, especially among the young, as evidenced by Menudo on ABC, a series of four minute music spots that aired during the Fall 1983 season of ABC's youth-oriented Saturday-morning programming block. They also sang the theme song for ABC's Rubik, the Amazing Cube. Miguel Cancel became the first member to voluntarily quit the group. According to a 1998 interview, he was unhappy that a sudden voice change rendered him unable to sing his songs, so he opted to leave before his scheduled departure. He was replaced by Roy Rosselló, 13. Menudo signed a six-year multimillion-dollar contract with RCA International and released their Spanish album A Todo Rock (Full of Rock). According to Time magazine, at the end of July, the group had already sold 3 million copies worldwide, 750,000 in USA only.

Around that time, Menudo merchandise began to be mass-produced. Merchandise included Menudo dolls, which appeared in the United States and Latin American toy markets in 1984, Menudo Topps trading cards, wristwatches, fotonovelas, fanzines, T-shirts, a 1981 board game named "Menudo Karshow" and other clothing accessories and school supplies. In 1984, Robby Rosa (now known as Draco Rosa), 14, replaced Johnny Lozada, 16, just in time for Menudo to release their first English-language album, Reaching Out, which featured the theme track "Like a Cannonball" for the Hollywood movie Cannonball Run 2; and their first Portuguese album, Mania, both featuring versions of some of their Spanish hits. During the first half of 1984, Menudo toured the U.S. and Brazil. The Spanish version "Como Cannonball" was used in the Filipino youth movie Bagets 2 and also featured the song "Fly Away".

Menudo in early 1984. (top) Ricky Mel, Charlie, Robi; (bottom) Ray, Roy

On September 16, 1984, Ricky Melendez, 16, the sole remaining original member, left the group. Up until then, he was the only Menudo member to remain with the group for seven years. He was replaced by Ricky Martin, then 12, who debuted on the album Evolución (Evolution). During this time, Menudo's popularity reached parts of Asia including Japan and the Philippines, and the group made English-language commercials for Pepsi, Scope, Burger King, McDonald's, and Crest. They also made a guest appearance on the popular American children's program Sesame Street. By the end of September, sales of their records surpassed 8 million copies worldwide. Then, much to the surprise of fans and himself, Ray Reyes, 15, departed the group earlier than expected, due to internal conflicts between Ray's father and the manager (information recently confirmed by his brother Raúl Reyes). In a 1998 interview, Reyes stated he was surprised when during a Menudo interview in 1985, the interviewer asked who would leave the group next and Edgardo Díaz named Ray. The group also had a weekly television show called "Menudo Mania".

Raymond Acevedo (13) took over Reyes' spot in 1985 and Menudo sang vocals for the Spanish-English song "Cantare, Cantaras" (I Will Sing, You Will Sing) with various Latin artists to raise money for UNICEF. This song was the Latin American version of "We Are the World". "Cantare, Cantaras" was recorded on April 9, 1985, at the A&M Studios. The group released their second English-language album, Menudo which contains the songs "Hold Me" (#62 Billboard Hot 100, RCA 14087) and "Explosion", both with lead vocals by Robi Rosa. They also released their next Spanish album, Ayer Y Hoy (Yesterday And Today), and their second Portuguese album A Festa Vai Comecar (The Party Is Going To Start). They successfully toured Brazil, performing before hundreds of thousands of fans, but there were allegations of the tour being poorly organized: the capacity for a concert in Rio de Janeiro was 60,000 but 70,000 tickets were sold, and 2 women died. In São Paulo, a 100,000-capacity stadium was sold-out with 200,000 people, and in the São Paulo city of Campinas, rain delayed a concert for 4 hours.

In 1986, the song King Holiday was recorded. Later in the year Roy Rosselló (15) was replaced by Sergio Blass (13) but no farewell concert was held. According to a book written by Raymond Acevedo's father in 2012 titled "Papi, Quiero Ser Un Menudo," Roy threatened to expose management irregularities to the press and was given a huge sum of money to leave the group due to his behavior as it was deemed by creator Edgardo Diaz as "uncontrollable." At this time, Menudo's management started bending the rules a little and started allowing members to remain in the group after reaching the age limit. Sergio had been in two Puerto Rican groups prior to joining Menudo; the first being Concepto Juvenil from 1983 to 1985, and then Los Chicos de Puerto Rico, for a few months in 1985. The group released several albums that year, starting with their only Italian album, Viva! Bravo!, which they showcased in Italy in the San Remo Music Festival. The Spanish album Refrescante (Refreshing), the English album Can't Get Enough, and the Portuguese album Menudo followed respectively, then came tours of the U.S., Latin America (including Brazil), and the Philippines.

=== Internal conflicts and image change ===
In October 1986, Ralphy Rodriguez (13) entered the group to replace Charlie (17) just as the group began facing internal conflicts. First, Robby (17) quit without warning in the midst of a Brazilian tour, becoming the third member to quit voluntarily. Menudo's Summer in the Street U.S. tour introduced new member Rubén Gómez (13).

At that point, the group underwent a complete image makeover, changing their look to a rougher, more rugged, rock-n-roll-like look. Members were Ralphy, Ruben, Ricky Martin, Sérgio and Raymond: this formation became known as Los Hijos Del Rock. Their music, formerly described as bubblegum-pop, underwent a similar change. They released the Spanish album Somos Los Hijos del Rock (We Are The Sons Of Rock), followed by an English-Tagalog album for the Philippines titled In Action with Ralphy and Rubén. In late 1987, Ralphy's parents pulled him from the group. Charlie was again asked to fill in during the Philippines tour, which would be their last as their popularity there waned.

In early 1988, Angelo García (11) replaced Ralphy Rodríguez (14) and they released their final English-language album, Sons of Rock, scoring an international hit, "You Got Potential". Another song, "TLC" (aka A Little TLC), featured lead vocals by Ricky Martin. In August 1988, Raymond Acevedo's contract was about to expire, but he decided to leave before auditions were held for his replacement, and Menudo performed as a quartet for a few months before Robert Avellanet (13) took over. The album Sombras Y Figuras was released at the end of the year. During 1989, longtime member Ricky Martin (17) left the group to pursue a solo career. Rawy Torres (13) years old, replaced him and the formation Los Ultimos Heroes was born and they released the album Los Últimos Héroes. This formation was a success. They filmed a telenovela of the same name. Future member Jonathan Montenegro acted alongside them.

=== 1990s ===
Despite their newfound success, the group kept facing problems: At age 13 during a concert in Caracas, Venezuela, Angelo García left the stage because of the pain of appendicitis; a new member was chosen by Sergio's mother and he was César Abreu (13), who only lasted 7 months. Like Sergio, Abreu was in Concepto Juvenil, from 1989 to early 1990. They released another Portuguese album, Os Ultimos Herois.

Management was preparing for Sergio's departure and debuted the first non-Puerto Rican member, Adrián Olivares (13) of Mexico, who entered the group with the formation of Ruben/Robert/Rawy/Cesar/Adrian, (although Sergio was still, officially, a member) but Abreu suddenly departed just seven months in the group. Management decided to bring Sergio back in (making him the second member to be back in Menudo after Charlie Masso) for another Spanish album, No Me Corten El Pelo (Don't Cut My Hair) featuring the Sergio/Rubén/Robert/Rawy/Adrián lineup. During this time, Menudo: Edicion Brasil was renamed to Os Ultimos Herois, but Cesar's vocals were kept as the cover was changed with Adrian in it and also an additional track sung by Rawy Torres.

On November 22, 1990, two members were arrested at Miami International Airport, Sergio Blass and Ruben Gomez, ages 18 and 16, after a sniffer dog found marijuana in their pockets. It would have been acquired in Mexico while touring with Menudo. This resulted in a scandal and an expulsion from both of the members. In December, two new non-Puerto Rican members joined the group: Edward Aguilera (13) of Spain replaced Sergio Blass (18) (thus becoming the second European, after Fernando Salaberry, to be a member of the band) and Jonathan Montenegro (12) of Venezuela replaced Rubén Gómez (16).

At the end of 1990, with the resignation of Ruben Gomez and Sérgio Blass and the entry of the two new members, a new controversy arose: Jonathan, Edward, Rawy and Robert resigned from Menudo, alleging abuse and mistreatment. This lineup lasted very little, from December 1990 to April 1991, and they didn't record any albums. Robert and Rawy went on to create a separate group called Euphoria, Edward's singing career fizzled out, and Jonathan continued his acting career.

Adrian was the only one who remained in the group after he was approached while in Mexico and also was paid the money owed to him. The Management proposed a new lineup with a more international focus and Adrian wanting to be the oldest in the group accepted to come back. Edgardo Díaz left Puerto Rico and held auditions in Miami, Florida, signing Miami teens Alexis Grullón (13), Ashley Ruiz (15), and Andy Blázquez (12), and Pecos, Texas resident Abel Talamántez (12). The first album with the new lineup was Detrás De Tu Mirada, which was very successful in the whole continent, especially in Peru. From then on, the Peruvian fanbase was the most important one.

Menudo continued to work, releasing an English single titled "Dancin', Movin', Shakin'", and a follow-up in 1993, "Cosmopolitan Girl", on McGillis Records. They also continued to travel through Latin America. In March 1992, Menudo filmed in New York City "The Making of Dancin, Movin, Shakin" for Darrin McGillis Productions. In August 2012, the film was released for free viewing on YouTube.

In 1992, they released 15 Años (15 Years), which would be Adrián's last album with the band, when he left in 1993. The album had hits such as "Buscame" and "Lo Que Juramos". Ricky López (13) replaced Adrián (16) and the group released their fifth Portuguese album Vem Pra Mim (Come to Me) in 1993. The next year, they released their 22nd Spanish album, Imaginate... (Imagine), with hits like "Un Hombre Que Sabia Demas", which is the Spanish version of "Um Homem Que Sabia Demais" from Skank, "Yo Quiero Bailar Reggae", and "Mil Angeles", which was dedicated to a fan, Cecilia Lopez, who died at one of their concerts in Peru the year before.

In 1995, Ricky López (15) quit the group without warning, and again the band performed as a quartet for a few months. Ashley (19) had also decided to leave, so auditions were held and Didier Hernández (16) and Anthony Galindo (16) were chosen. Ashley's farewell concert was in Panama, where the new members were presented. In 1996, the group released their last Spanish album under the Menudo name, Tiempo De Amar (Time to Love). The album was very successful, producing several hit singles. In 1997, Andy Blázquez (18) left the group and was replaced by Daniel René Weider. A spinoff group was formed as MDO. A Spanish album was released titled MDO.

=== El Reencuentro ===
In 1998 Ricky Meléndez, René Farrait, Miguel Cancel, Johnny Lozada, Ray Reyes, and Charlie Massó re-joined to celebrate the 15th anniversary of their success in Latin America, North America, Spain, and several other countries. They planned the reunion concert to take place at Centro de Bellas Artes in the San Juan suburb of Santurce, as an experimental project. They ended up doing the shows at the much larger Coliseo Roberto Clemente in San Juan, instead. They had an unexpected success and performed as an ensemble throughout North and Latin America until August 2015, when the group disbanded due to financial issues. They named this El Reencuentro because they could not use the "Menudo" name.

=== 2000s ===
In 2000, MDO released their album Subir Al Cielo with critical success. The album lead track "Te Quise Olvidar" topped the Billboard Hot Latin Tracks for several weeks. The group follow-up singles "Sin Ti" and "Me Huele a Soledad" also reached the top 10 in the U.S.. In 2002, former members Sergio, Rubén, Robert, Angelo and Rawy reunited under the name "Los Últimos Héroes" giving numerous concerts in Venezuela.

In early 2003, MDO officially broke up on amicable terms. The members wanted to pursue other projects. Edgardo Díaz introduced the new MDO in January 2005. In 2004, Edgardo Díaz announced that he would be bringing a new group with the Menudo formula into the music industry. Initially expecting this new group to be named Menudo, he surprised the press and general public by naming them Tick Tock.

Also in 2004, former Menudo members Roy, Raymond, Rubén, Sergio and Andy reunited under the name and banner: Menudo: La Reunion. They were based and focused primarily on a series of 'Brazilian' tours. Sergio left due to his prior commitment with "Los Últimos Héroes", and was replaced with Anthony Galindo. Andy would later be replaced by former MDO member Caleb Avilés before disbanding in late 2005, early 2006. In January 2005, producer Edgardo Díaz introduced the new MDO with four new members: Daniel Rodríguez, Luis Montes, Elliot Suro, and Lorenzo Duarte. The first three were among the contestants of Puerto Rican reality/talent show Objetivo Fama. This latest incarnation of the group achieved great success with their single "Otra Vez" which took them all across Latin America.

Also, in 2005, former Menudo members René, Johnny, Miguel, Ricky, Charlie, and Ray reunited once again to perform the songs that Menudo popularized during their era under the name and banner El Reencuentro: Momento del Adios making this their farewell tour. There were plans to bring this production to Latin America and the U.S. Also in 2005, Sergio, Angelo, Robert, Rawy and Adrián reunited again under the name Los Últimos Héroes after their successful reunion concerts in 2002.

In 2006, former Menudo: La Reunion members, Anthony and Rubén reunited and formed the duo Blacksheep and continued touring in Brazil. The duo grew a large fan base in both Brazil and Hispanic America. In 2007, a re-release of the 1992 VHS film of Menudo The making of Dancin', Movin', Shakin'" was released on McGillis Records. Entitled Triple Threat DVD/CD Combo, the box set included the Film on DVD for the first time, along with two music CDs, Latin Teen Stars and Dance Music All Night Long, featuring hit songs by Menudo, ex-Menudo members. The single, "Dancin', Movin', Shakin'", and "Cosmopolitan Girl" was released digitally on iTunes in May 2009.

=== 2007–2009 lineup ===
In 2007, it was announced that Menudo would return after signing a multi-album contract with Sony Music. That would be directed by Johnny Wright, he was the manager of Justin Timberlake and the new band music was to be a fusion of urban, pop and rock in both English and Spanish. They began promoting the project in cities of the United States and Mexico to attract young singers who wanted to belong to a new band that would sing in Spanish and English. Auditions in different cities such as Los Angeles, Dallas, Miami, New York, among others. In the Dallas audition, radio announcer Daniel Luna and singer Luis Fonsi were part of the selection jury. where they were selected JC Gonzalez and Monti Montañez (Che Antonio). In New York, they took 25 boys and during this one-week mini-competency they chose 15: Monti Montañez (Che Antonio), JC Gonzalez, Carlos Pena, Jr., Anthony, Carlos Olivero, Chris Moy, Dennis, Eric, Hansel, Henry, Jorge Gabriel, Jorge Negron, José Bordonada, Monti Montañez (Che Antonio), Thomas and Trevor. The 15 semifinalists met in South Beach, Florida to continue preparing with producer Johnny Wright, choreograph Anibal Marrero and voice coach David Coury, participating through a reality show showing the entire process of competition. The re-founding of the band was profiled in a MTV reality series entitled Making Menudo that had launched as a primetime series on October 25, 2007, but was later pushed to afternoons due to low ratings. The series aired ten episodes, ending on November 20, 2007.

The members chosen in this version were: Jose Bordonada Collazo, Chris Moy, Emmanuel Vélez Pagán, Monti Montañez (Che Antonio), and Carlos Olivero. In December, a few weeks after the members of the group were chosen, their More Than Words EP was released, including four songs: "More Than Words (A E I O U)," "Mas Que Amor (A E I O U)," "Move," and "This Christmas." Their first album was scheduled for release in autumn of 2008.

In 2009 they had a video in two versions titled: "Lost", in which the American actress, model and singer of Puerto Rican descent, Victoria Justice, appeared, which attracted much attention of the public towards the video. The group disbanded in early 2009.

=== 2015-2025 ===
After having internal band problems, El Reencuentro disbanded in 2015; Charlie Massó threatened to take legal action with Johnny Lozada, who had financial and managerial control of the project at the time. During 2016, four members of El Reencuentro René Farrait, Charlie Massó, Ray Reyes, Miguel Cancel and joined by Robert Avellanet went back on tour, this time under the name Menudo. However the project disbanded quickly and continued with the Menudomania Forever Tour produced by In Miami Productions formed by other Menudo and MDO members from different eras, including Avellanet, Jonathan Montenegro and Rawy Torres. In 2019, Ricky Meléndez, Johnny Lozada, Miguel Cancel, Ray Reyes and René Farrait, reunited once again for the "Súbete a Mi Moto Tour" that kicked off at the Dunkin' Donuts Center and included dates in Latin America. It was later informed that Robert Avellanet was replacing Miguel Cancel for the remainder of the tour that is on hold due to the COVID-19 pandemic.

In September 2020, former Menudo and MDO member Anthony Galindo was found unconscious after attempting suicide. He died days later after remaining hospitalized and became the first Menudo member to pass away. His family described the singer's deep depression from the prolonged shutdown of various entertainment performance venues caused by the COVID-19 pandemic. His organs were donated in accordance with his last wish. Longtime member Ray Reyes died April 30, 2021, of a heart attack in his childhood home in Toa Baja, Puerto Rico at 51. The group finished its last version of the "Súbete A Mi Moto Tour" with members Ricky Meléndez, René Farrait, Johnny Lozada and Miguel Cancel.

In April 2025, NBC was sued in Federal Court for libel to the brand name Menudo. NBC Lawsuit Story on TMZ Menudo Promoter Sues NBC

=== 2022 - 2025 rebirth and reboot ===
It was announced during 2022 that a new group of people, led by Mexican-American actor Mario Lopez, would launch a reboot of Menudo. The project, named "Menudo: A New Beginning", held online auditions as well as ones in Miami, Florida, New York, NY, San Juan, Puerto Rico. and more.

On March 20, 2023, the new members of boy band, Menudo, performed on Good Morning America. The band's members were Alejandro Querales (aged 16), Ezra Gilmore (aged 14), Gabriel Rossell (aged 15), Andrés Emilio Pirela (aged 15), and Nicolas Calero (aged 12). In 2024 they competed on America's Got Talent. Ezra Gilmore and Nicolas Calero have since quit the band. Gilmore and Calero were substituted by Janvier Flores and Zaulo Enchautegui.

== Band members ==
The following list names past Menudo members. Edgardo Díaz's group had a long list of members because the boys had to leave after turning a certain age, usually the age ranges from 15–18 years old when they depart (With the exception of Rene Farrait, Xavier Serbia, Ralphy Rodriguez, Angelo Garcia, Cesar Abreu, Edward Aguilera, Jonathan Montenegro, Ricky Lopez and Ashley Ruiz).

Members	Ages in the group	Years in the group	Status	Replaced by	Notes
Nefty Sallaberry	13–15	1977–79	Retired	René Farrait	
Carlos Meléndez	12–15	1977–80	Retired	Johnny Lozada	Brother of Oscar & Ricky and cousin of Edgardo Díaz
Fernando Sallaberry	12–15	1977–80	Retired	Xavier Serbiá	Born in Spain. became popular as a soloist in Puerto Rico and in South America but suffers from Neuromuscular disease, a rare condition that has no cure, which led him to use a wheelchair and forcing him to retire. He was the first member to do so.
Óscar Meléndez	11–15	1977–81	Retired	Miguel Cancel	Brother of Carlos & Ricky and cousin of Edgardo Díaz
Ricky Meléndez	9–16	1977–84	Active	Ricky Martin	Brother of Carlos & Oscar and cousin of Edgardo Díaz
René Farrait	12–15	1979–82	Retired	Charlie Masso	
Johnny Lozada	12–16	1980–84	Active	Robby Rosa	
Xavier Serbiá	12–15	1980–83	Retired	Ray Reyes	Financial analyst on CNN en Español
Miguel Cancel	13–15	1981–83	Active	Roy Rossello	Born in U.S.A. (first American-born member) Became the first member to quit voluntarily.
Charlie Massó	12–17	1982–87	Retired	Ralphy Rodríguez	
Ray Reyes	13–15	1983–85	Deceased	Raymond Acevedo	Grew too tall (born in U.S.A.)
Roy Rosselló	13–16	1983–86	Retired	Sergio Gonzalez	Became the second member to quit voluntarily.
Robby Rosa	14–17	1984–87	Active	Rubén Gómez	Born in U.S.A. Became the third member to quit voluntarily.
Ricky Martin	12–17	1984–89	Active	Rawy Torres	
Raymond Acevedo Kercado	13–16	1985–88	Active	Robert Avellanet	He is currently Active in a group with Sergio, Ralphy and Ruben
Sergio Gonzalez	13–18	1986–90	Active	Edward Aguilera	Born in U.S.A. and was expelled due to the marijuana scandal. He is currently active in a group with Raymond, Ralphy and Ruben
Ralphy Rodríguez	13–14	1986-87	Active	Angelo García	He is currently Active in a group with Raymond, Sergio and Ruben. He was the fourth member to quit voluntarily after his parents pulled him out in November 1987.
Rubén Gómez	13–16	1987–90	Active	Jonathan Montenegro	Born in U.S.A. and was expelled due to the marijuana scandal. He is currently active in a group with Raymond, Sergio and Ralphy
Angelo García	11–13	1988–90	Unknown	César Abreu	Born in U.S.A.
Robert Avellanet	13–16	1988–91	Active	Alexis Grullón	He was one of the four members who left in 1991.
Rawy Torres	14–16	1989–91	Active	Ashley Ruiz	He was one of the four members who left in 1991.
César Abreu	13	1990	Active	Adrián Olivares	The second member to leave in the same year he joined in.
Adrián Olivares	14–17	1990–93	Deceased	Ricky López	Born in Mexico. When he left, he did podcasting.
Edward Aguilera	13–14	1990–91	Retired	Andy Blázquez	Born in Spain. He was one of the four members who left in 1991. He and Montenegro were the only ones who didn't record CDs
Jonathan Montenegro	12-13	1990–91	Active	Abel Talamántez	Born in Venezuela. He was one of the four members who left in 1991. He and Aguilera were the only ones who didn't record CDs
Alexis Grullón	13-18	1991–97	Active	Moved to MDO	Born in U.S.A. (first member of Dominican descent)
Ashley Ruiz	15–19	1991–95	Active	Didier Hernández	Born in U.S.A. (first member of Cuban descent)
Andy Blázquez	12–18	1991–97	Retired	Moved to MDO	
Abel Talamántez	12–18	1991–97	Active	Moved to MDO	First Mexican-American.
Ricky López	12–14	1993–95	Retired	Anthony Galindo	Nicknamed 'Ricky III'. He was supposed to do a solo career, but he was involved in a car accident in 2004, though he survived despite his one month in a coma, he had multiple injuries and it left him on the wheelchair, forcing him to retire. He was the second member to do so.
Anthony Galindo	16–18	1995–97	Deceased	Moved to MDO	Born in Venezuela.
Didier Hernández	16–18	1995–97	Active	Moved to MDO	Born in Cuba.
José Bordonada Collazo	15–17	2007–09	Quit	Member until disbandment	
José Montañez "Monti Montanez" now (Che Antonio)	18–20	2007–09	Retired	Member until disbandment	
Chris Moy		2007–09	Quit	Member until disbandment	
Carlito Olivero	18–20	2007–09	Retired	Member until disbandment	
Emmanuel Vélez Pagán		2007–09	Quit	Member until disbandment	
Alejandro Querales	16	2023–present	Active	Current member	Born in Venezuela
Ezra Gilmore	14	2023–2024	Quit	Former member	Born in California. Half Nicaraguan, half Black.
Gabriel Rossell	15	2023–present	Active	Current member	Born in Venezuela
Andrés Emilio Pirela	15	2023–present	Active	Current member	Born in Venezuela
Nicolas Calero	12	2023–2024	Quit	Former member	Born in New York. Half Puerto Rican, half Russian.
Janvier Flores	17	2025-	Active		Born in Caguas, Puerto Rico
Zaulo Enchautegui	17	2025-	Active		

== Discography ==
- Los Fantasmas (1977)
- Laura (1978)
- Chiquitita (1979)
- Felicidades! (1979)
- Más, Mucho Más... (1980)
- Es Navidad (1980)
- Fuego (1980)
- Xanadu (1981)
- Quiero Ser (1981)
- Por Amor (1982)
- A Todo Rock (1983)
- Reaching Out (1984)
- Mania (1984)
- Evolución (1984)
- Menudo (1985)
- Ayer Y Hoy (1985)
- Viva! Bravo! (1986)
- Refrescante... (1986)
- Can't Get Enough (1986)
- Somos Los Hijos del Rock (1987)
- In Action (1987)
- Sons of Rock (1988)
- Sombras & Figuras (1988)
- Los Últimos Héroes (1989)
- Os Últimos Heróis (1990)
- No Me Corten El Pelo (1990)
- Detras de tu Mirada (1991)
- 15 Años (1992)
- Vem Pra Mim (1993)
- Imagínate (1994)
- Tiempo de Amar (1996)

== Other works ==
=== Films and television ===
- Unknown date 300 millones
- 1977 El Show de Tommy
- 1977 Menudo – En Concierto
- 1978 Noche de Gala
- 1979-mid 1980s La Gente Joven de Menudo
- 1981 Menudo: La Pelicula
- 1981 Quiero Ser (telenovela)
- 1980s Menudo Mania
- 1982 Es por Amor (Venezuelan Mini Soap Opera)
- 1982 Una Aventura Llamada Menudo
- 1983 Menudo on ABC
- 1983 Silver Spoons (TV Series)
- 1984 Sesame Street (TV Series)
- 1985 The Love Boat (TV Series)
- 1985 Solid Gold
- 1986 Menudo Video Explosion
- 1986 Por Siempre Amigos
- 1990 Los ultimos heroes (mini series)
- 1992 The Making of Dancin Movin Shakin on YouTube McGillis Records
- 2007 Making Menudo (TV Series)
- 2022 Menudo: Forever Young (Documentary Series)

=== Specials ===
- 1982 A Ritmo Menudo with Karla Maria
- 1983 Contigo Xavier with Karla Maria.
- 1986 King Holiday
- 1989 Nueva Navidad
- 1990 Optimismo

=== Commercials ===
Comercial Thom McAn – (1981)

== Series and movies ==
- 1979 – Menudo – Leyenda De Amor (TV movie)
- 1981 – Menudo: La Pelicula
- 1982 – Una Aventura Llamada Menudo
- 1992 – The Making of Dancin Movin Shakin on YouTube
- 1987 – Novel Por Siempre Amigos
- 1990 – Serie Los Ultimos Heroes
- 2020 – Serie Subete a Mi Moto: After years of planning and development, on September 17, 2020, it was announced that a TV series about the group titled Súbete A Mi Moto was set to premier on Amazon Prime Video. The series was released on October 9, 2020. The series focused the story from the perspective of Edgardo Díaz, founder and manager of the group.
- 2021 – Menudo: Forever Young (Documentary): In contrast to the “Súbete a Mi Moto” Series, launched in 2020, by the streaming platform, from Amazon Prime, which tells the story of the boy band from the perspective of Edgardo Díaz, the idea arose of producing a material that told the version of the Former members of Menudo. The documentary, Menudo: Forever Young, directed by Puerto Rican, Angel Miguel Soto, premiered in June 2022 on the platform by HBOMax and revealed alleged cases of bullying, drug scandals, exploitative working conditions, neglect of boys' health, abuse, physical violence, harassment, sexual abuse, and even a rape allegedly experienced by Ângelo Garcia (member from 1988 to 1990) while he participated in Menudo.
- 2023 – Menendez + Menudo: Boys Betrayed: A 2023 Peacock documentary that explores the connection of the Menendez brothers' case with new allegations against their father, José Menendez. The documentary focuses on former Menudo member Roy Rosselló, who claims that José, then-executive of RCA, sexually assaulted him during his time in the band.

== Awards and nominations ==
Award/organization	Year	Nominee/work	Category	Result	Ref.
Agüeybaná Awards (Puerto Rico)	—N/a	Menudo	—N/a	Won	
Association of Latin Entertainment Critics (Latin ACE)	1984	Menudo	Extraordinary Award for Variety	Honoree	
Grammy Awards	1984	Una Aventura Llamada Menudo	Best Latin Pop Performance	Nominated	
Grammy Awards	1985	Evolucion	Best Latin Pop Performance	Nominated	
Guaicaipuro de Oro (Venezuela)	—N/a	Menudo	—N/a	Won	
Meridiano de Oro	1981	Menudo	Most Popular Artists	Won	
Premio El Cemi (Puerto Rico)	1984	Menudo	International Youth Representation	Won	
Paoli Awards (Puerto Rico)	1985	Menudo	International Group	Won	
Tokyo Music Festival	1984	"Explosión"	Gold Award (#2 place)	Won	

== Tours ==
- Hide Your Sheep Tour (1983)

Date (1983)	City	Country	Venue
January 9	Buenos Aires	Argentina	Estadio Obras Sabitarias
March 12	Mexico City	Mexico	Estadio Azteca
March 13	Mexico City	Mexico	Plaza de Toros Mexico
March 24	Bucaramanga	Colombia	Club Unión
April 17	Maracaibo	Venezuela	Estadio Luis Aparicio El Grande
April 18	Caracas	Venezuela	Plaza de Toros Nuevo Circo
June 18	New York City	United States	Madison Square Garden
June 19	New York City	United States	Madison Square Garden
June 20	New York City	United States	Madison Square Garden
June 21	New York City	United States	Madison Square Garden
November 12	Universal City	United States	Universal Amphitheater
November 13	Universal City	United States	Universal Amphitheater
November 15	Daly City	United States	Cow Palace
December 18	Lima	Peru	Estadio Alejandro Villanueva

- Menudo in Concert Tour (1985)

Date (1985)	City	Country	Venue
February 22	Honolulu	United States	Blaisdell Arena
February 26	Belém	Brazil	Estádio Jornalista Edgar Augusto Proença
February 27	Fortaleza	Brazil	Arena Castelão
March 1	Recife	Brazil	Estádio José do Regó Maciel
March 2	Salvador	Brazil	Estádio Octávio Mangabeira
March 5	Goiânia	Brazil	Estádio Serra Dourado
March 6	Brasília	Brazil	Estádio Mané Garrincha
March 7	Campo Grande	Brazil	Ginásio Poliesportivo Avelino dos Reis
March 9	Belo Horizonte	Brazil	Mineirão
March 10	Rio de Janeiro	Brazil	Estádio São Januário
March 12	Porto Alegre	Brazil	Estádio Olímpico Monumental
March 15	Curitiba	Brazil	Estádio Couto Pereira
March 16	São Paulo	Brazil	Estádio do Morumbi
March 17	Santos	Brazil	Estádio Urbano Caldeira
April 14	Honolulu	United States	Blaisdell Arena
May 4	Buenos Aires	Argentina	Estadio Luna Park
August 14	São Paulo	Brazil	Ginásio deo Ibirapuera
August 15	São Paulo	Brazil	Ginásio deo Ibirapuera
August 16	São Paulo	Brazil	Ginásio deo Ibirapuera
August 17	São Paulo	Brazil	Ginásio deo Ibirapuera
August 18	São Paulo	Brazil	Ginásio deo Ibirapuera
September 15	São Paulo	Brazil	Estádio do Morumbi
November 6	Providence	United States	Providence Performing Arts Center

- Sons of Rock Tour (1988)

Date (1988)	City	Country	Venue
May 6	Mexico City	Mexico	Unknown
October 22	Chicago	United States	International Amphitheater
October 27	San Antonio	United States	Joe Freeman Coliseum

- Nights on Fire Tour (1989)

Date (1989)	City	Country	Venue
May 6	Maracay	Venezuela	Plaza de Toros la Maestranza
May 7	Valencia	Venezuela	Estadio Polideportivo Misael Delgado
May 12	Maracaibo	Venezuela	Plaza de Toros Monumental
May 13	Puerto La Cruz	Venezuela	Centro Sirio
May 14	Caracas	Venezuela	Poliedro de Caracas
June 10	New York City	United States	Avery Fisher Hall at Lincoln Center
October 28	Caracas	Venezuela	Poliedro de Caracas
October 29	Caracas	Venezuela	Poliedro de Caracas

- Bandemonium Tour [with V Factory, NLT] (2008)

Date (2008)	City	Country	Venue
May 1	Las Vegas	United States	House of Blues
May 3	San Francisco		Great American Music Hall
May 4	San Diego		House of Blues

- Súbete A Mi Moto World Tour (2019/2020/2021/2022/2023)

Date (2019)	City	Country	Venue
September 6	San Juan	Puerto Rico	Coliseo de Puerto Rico
Date (2020)	City	Country	Venue
August 20	Caracas	Venezuela	Poliedro de Caracas
Date (2021)	City	Country	Venue
October 2	San Juan	Puerto Rico	Coca-Cola Music Hall
December 16	Monterrey	Mexico	Auditorio Citibanamex
December 17	Mexico City	Mexico	Arena CDMX
December 18	Querétaro	Mexico	Auditorio Josefa Ortiz de Domínguez
Date (2022)	City	Country	Venue
August 20	Caracas	Venezuela	Poliedro de Caracas
October 29	Santiago de Surco	Peru	Explanada Olguín
November 12	Miami	United States	Sebastian’s Venue
November 24	Barranquilla	Colombia	
November 25	Cali	Colombia	
November 26	Bogotá	Colombia	Carpa Cafam
Date (2023)	City	Country	Venue
March 11	Quito	Ecuador	Quorom (Paseo San Francisco)
May 12	Monterrey	Mexico	
May 13	Guadalajara	Mexico	Foro Guanamor
May 14	Mexico City	Mexico	Pepsi Center
May 18	Córdoba	Argentina	Quality Espacio
May 19	Buenos Aires	Argentina	Estadio Luna Park

== See also ==
- List of best-selling Latin music artists
- List of Menudo members
- MDO
- El Reencuentro
- Proyecto M
