= Ricky Meléndez =

Puerto Rican singer, member of Puerto Rican boy band Menudo

- Born: Ricardo Omar Meléndez Saurí; November 22, 1967 (age 58)
- Origin: Hato Rey, Puerto Rico
- Genres: Latin pop, Rock
- Occupations: Singer, lawyer
- Instrument: Vocals
- Years active: 1977-present

Ricky Meléndez (born Ricardo Omar Meléndez Saurí, November 22, 1967 in Hato Rey, Puerto Rico) is a Puerto Rican singer, lawyer, and actor, best known for his tenures as a member of boy band Menudo and of El Reencuentro.

== Career ==
He was raised in Guaynabo. He became a member of Menudo at the age of nine. He was one of the original five in the group joined by his brothers Carlos and Oscar, and brothers Fernando and Nefty Salaberry. He is also the cousin of group founder Edgardo Díaz. As a member of Menudo, he acted in two films: Menudo: La Pelicula and Una Aventura Llamada Menudo. He was a member of the band through most of the band's golden era and he's remembered for singing lead in the tracks "Y Yo No Bailo", "Amor en Bicicleta" and "Cámbiale Las Pilas".

Meléndez retired from Menudo in 1984 at the mandatory age of 16, but since he had started at age nine, he became the band member with the longest tenure at seven years. He gave up his place to Ricky Martin. His final concert with Menudo was in Caguas, where he was joined by most of the former Menudo members on that concert's date, September 16, 1984.

Once Meléndez left Menudo, he tried various business ventures, including a shop at Plaza Las Americas in San Juan, and became a lawyer. In 1998, he got together with former bandmates Rene Farrait, Johnny Lozada, Ray Reyes, Charlie Masso and Miguel Cancel to make a comeback tour under the name of El Reencuentro. They toured the world.

== Personal life ==
Melendez attended the University High School in San Juanl. Meléndez graduated in 1995 with a juris doctor from the University of Puerto Rico Law School and practices corporate and real estate law at Pietrantoni Mendez & Alvarez LLC. Meléndez also has a B.A. from University of Central Florida in broadcasting.

Melendez is married to Miriam "Muñeca" Calderín. He has one son and one daughter.

== In pop culture ==
Melendez is played by Marcelo Otano and by Eugenio Rivera in the 2020 Amazon Prime Video series based on Menudo, "Subete A Mi Moto".

== Discography ==
=== With Menudo ===
- Los Fantasmas (1977)
- Laura (1978)
- Chiquitita (1979)
- Felicidades (1979)
- Mas Mucho Mas (1980)
- Es Navidad (1980)
- Fuego (1981)
- Xanadu (1981)
- Quiero Ser (1981)
- Por Amor (1982)
- Una aventura llamada Menudo (1982)
- Feliz Navidad (1982)
- A Todo Rock (1983)
- Reaching Out (1984)
- Mania (1984)

== See also ==
- List of Puerto Ricans
