= René Farrait =

Puerto Rican musician and actor

Rene Farrait
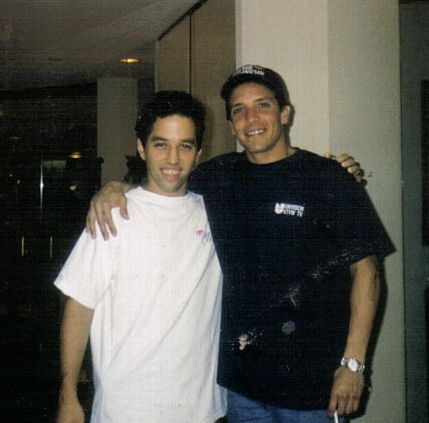
- Rene Farrait (right, with dark shirt) at Phoenix, Arizona in 1998
- Born: Rene Farrait; November 2, 1967 (age 59); San Juan, Puerto Rico
- Occupation: Singer

Rene Farrait Nieves (born November 2, 1967) is a Puerto Rican singer, actor, and former member of the boy band Menudo.

After leaving the band, Farrait enjoyed a brief solo career.

In the 1980s, Rene Farrait reunited with former Menudo bandmates Xavier Serbiá, Ray Reyes and Johnny Lozada (Reyes and Farrait were not Menudo members at the same time) and formed a trio called Proyecto M. (Reyes replaced Serbiá as a member of Proyecto M).

In 1998, Farrait joined five other former band members (including Reyes and Lozada) for a comeback tour named El Reencuentro.

Following El Reencuentro's break up in 2015, Farrait, along with Reyes and fellow former Menudo members Miguel Cancel, Charlie Massó (who had substituted Farrait as member of Menudo) and Robert Avellanet returned to touring, this time being allowed to use the name Menudo again but using the name Menudomania Forever.

== Acting ==
Farrait participated in a film named Menudo: La Pelicula along with his Menudo bandmates in 1981. When Una aventura llamada Menudo was shot in 1982, Farrait had already left the band; substituted by Charlie Massó; nevertheless, he appeared on the background during parts of the film as one of the film's main secondary characters, "Señora Mía", greatly enjoyed the band's last album with Rene on it and had a poster of Rene and his Menudo band-mates in her room.

In 2017, Farrait retook his film career, playing a priest on the Peruvian film La paisana Jacinta en búsqueda de Wasaberto.

== Personal life ==
Farrait was married to Carol Maldonado, and later got divorced. He has three daughters and is currently single.

== In pop culture ==
Farrait is played by Alejandro Bermúdez in the 2020 Amazon Prime Video series based on Menudo, "Súbete A Mi Moto".

== Discography ==
=== With Menudo ===
- Chiquitita (1979)
- Felicidades (1979)
- Mas Mucho Mas (1980)
- Es Navidad (1980)
- Fuego (1981)
- Xanadu (1981)
- Quiero Ser (1981)

=== With Proyecto M ===
- Proyecto M (1987)
- Proyecto M 2 (1989)
- Arde que me quemas (1991)
- Si esta no Conmigo (1993)

== See also ==
- List of Puerto Ricans
