= Carlos Meléndez (singer) =

Puerto Rican musician

Carlos Melendez
- Born: Carlos Javier Melendez Sauri; 10 April 1965 (age 60); Hato Rey, Puerto Rico
- Occupation: Singer
- Years active: 1977-1980;1987

Carlos Javier Meléndez Sauri (born 10 April 1965 in Hato Rey, Puerto Rico) is a Puerto Rican architect and singer who is a former member of Menudo.

Meléndez is a cousin of band creator Edgardo Diaz, who had success as director of La Pandilla in Spain and who admired the success obtained by The Jackson 5 in the United States. Carlos Meléndez and his brothers, Oscar and Ricky, wore curly hair, a style which was popular during the 1970s.

In 1977, Diaz created Menudo, asking Carlos and his brothers to become band members, along with Fernando and Nefty Sallaberry, who are also brothers. Carlos Meléndez lasted in Menudo until mid 1980, barely missing out on the group's golden era. The only Meléndez brother to participate during Menudo's era of worldwide fame was Ricky. Like Oscar, Carlos Meléndez did, however, become famous through Puerto Rico when the group began to have a televised show, and with two of Menudo's first hits: a Spanish version of ABBA's "Voulez Vous" and "Los Fantasmas". Carlos Meléndez tried a duo singing career with Fernando Sallaberry for a brief time after leaving Menudo. He did not record any major hits by himself, however, and soon, retired from music.

In 1987, 4 of the original 5 Menudo members, Carlos & Ricky Meléndez, and Nefty and Fernando Sallaberry reunited on a project - a group- they were going to call XCHANGE. There was some publicity, and they recorded a few demos, but were not offered a recording contract and disbanded.

Carlos Melendez is an architect who resides in Florida.

== In pop culture ==
Melendez is played by Leyson Andreck Brito in the 2020 Amazon Prime Video series based on Menudo, "Subete A Mi Moto".

== Discography ==
=== With Menudo ===
- Los Fantasmas (1977)
- Laura (1978)
- Chiquitita (1979)
- Felicidades (1979)

== See also ==
- List of Puerto Ricans
