= Rawy Torres =

Puerto Rican singer, composer, and guitarist

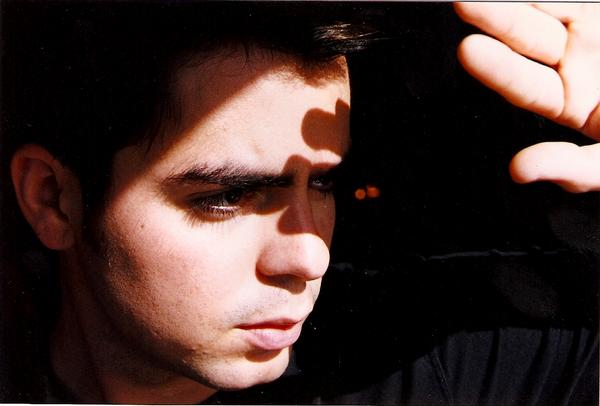

Background information
- Also known as: Rawy Torres
- Born: Wilson R. Torres
- Origin: Mayagüez, Puerto Rico
- Genres: Pop, pop rock, dance-pop, Latin pop, world
- Occupations: Singer-songwriter, musician, musical producer
- Years active: 1989–present
- Label: BM Records (1999–2003)
- Formerly of: Menudo

Wilson Ramón Torres Zapata "Rawy Torres" is a Puerto Rican singer, composer, and guitarist, who was a member of the boy band, Menudo.

== Biography ==
Torres joined Menudo in 1989, replacing Ricky Martin. Torres gained teen idol status in Latin America when Menudo released the Los Últimos Héroes CD. Torres also recorded a Portuguese version for his first album called Os Últimos Heróis.

Torres and bandmate Robert Avellanet both left Menudo in 1991, and almost immediately joined Euphoria, that had some success but broke up.

In 1999, Rawy went to Los Angeles, California where he produced and recorded his first solo album called Por si de amor se trata.

Torres then started a bachelor's degree in Business that was completed with honors in 2004 with a major in marketing. As 2024 Rawy Torres works as TSA officer in Florida.

Rawy Torres joined some of his former bandmates in a reunion group that was inspired by the success of El Reencuentro, another group that was composed by six former Menudos from the early 1980s. Torres and his fellow former Menudo bandmates, including Avellanet, named their reunion group Los Últimos Héroes.

== Discography ==
Studio albums in Spanish (Menudo)

- Los Ultimos Heroes CD (1989)
- No me corten el pelo (1990)

Studio albums in Spanish (Euphoria)

- Euphoria CD (1991)

Studio albums in Portuguese (Menudo)

- Os Ultimos Herois (1990)

COMPILATIONS

- Navidad Boricua (2002)
- Navidad Boricua (2003)
- Navidad Boricua (2004)

SOLO ALBUMS

- Por si de amor se trata (1999)

COLLABORATIONS (As Producer)

- Por si de amor se trata (1999)
- Mary Ann (2006)
- Valentina Moure (2010)

COLLABORATIONS (As Songwriter)

- Por si de amor se trata (1999)
- Lourdes Robles (2000)
- Mary Ann (2006)

== Filmography ==
Year	Film	Role
1990	Los Ultimos Heroes (TV Series)	Rawy
1989	Alondra (1 episode)	Cameo

== Theater ==
Year	Film	Role
2005	The Sound of Music (Puerto Rico)	Rolfe Gruber
2004	The Sound of Music (Puerto Rico)	Rolfe Gruber

== Tours ==
- Los Ultimos Heroes Tour (1989–9090)
- No me corten el pelo Tour (1990–1991)
- Por si de amor se trata Tour (1999–2001)
- Los Ultimos Heroes Tour (2003–2005)
