= Óscar Meléndez =

Puerto Rican singer

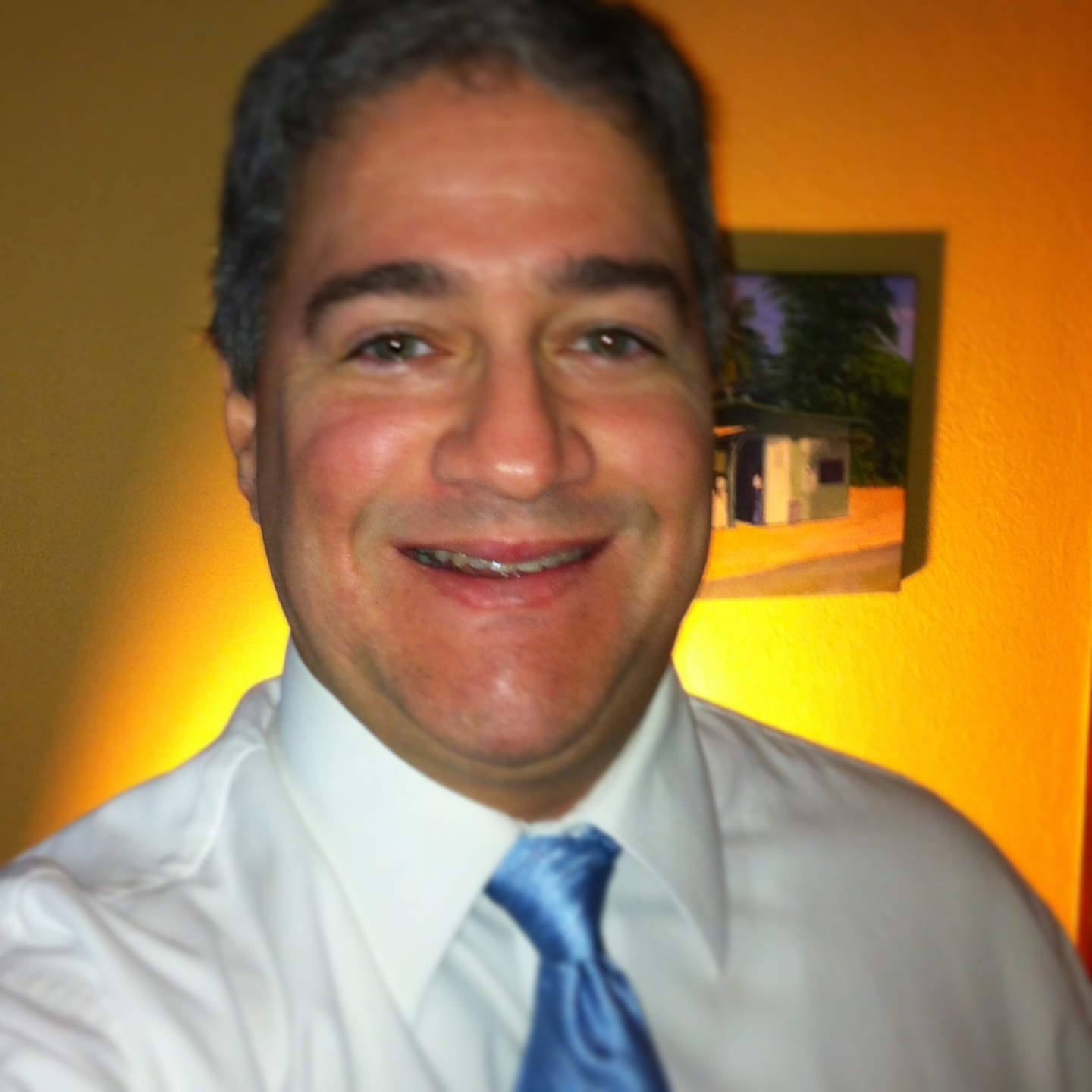
Óscar Meléndez

Óscar Meléndez Sauri (born 21 March 1966, San Juan, Puerto Rico) is a Puerto Rican lawyer and singer and former member of boy band Menudo.

Óscar is one of the five original members of Menudo, and the first cousin of group creator Edgardo Diaz. His older brother, Carlos Meléndez and younger brother, Ricky Meléndez, were also part of the original group. He was recruited by Edgardo when the group was founded in 1977, and left in 1981 at the age of 15, barely missing out on what would become the group's golden era.

Unlike his brothers, when his career with Menudo ended, he decided not to pursue any other endeavors in the music industry and went back to living a private life. Meléndez earned a Bachelor of Business Administration (B.B.A.) from the University of Puerto Rico in 1994, graduating cum laude, followed by a Juris doctor (J.D.) from the University of Puerto Rico School of Law in 1998, also cum laude. Melendez is, like brother Ricky, a lawyer who works in Puerto Rico.

== In pop culture ==
Melendez is played by Jossan Sebastian Lopez in the 2020 Amazon Prime Video series based on Menudo, "Subete A Mi Moto".

== Discography ==
=== With Menudo ===
- Los Fantasmas (1977)
- Laura (1978)
- Chiquitita (1979)
- Felicidades (1979)
- Mas Mucho Mas (1980)
- Es Navidad (1980)

== See also ==
- List of Puerto Ricans
