= Xavier Serbiá =

Puerto Rican financial commentator

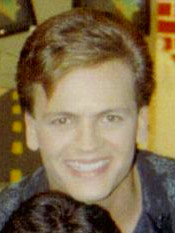
- Xavier Serbiá
- Born: July 24, 1968 (age 57); San Juan, Puerto Rico
- Occupations: Financial commentator and syndicated columnist

Francisco Xavier Serbiá Queipo (born July 24, 1968, in San Juan, Puerto Rico) is a financial commentator, syndicated columnist, and was news anchor of CNN Dinero at CNN en Español, from 2010 to 2023. Serbiá is also a former member of the boy band Menudo.

== Career ==
=== In Finance and journalism ===
Having already decided that music would not be part of his future, he finished his studies specializing in Finance, partly due to the financial problems he had thanks to the accountants who managed his fortune.

Serbiá has a master's degree in Financial Economics from Trinity College, Connecticut. He pursued an MBA with a specialization in Finance and also passed level I of the CFA exam.

Serbiá is the author of the best-seller "Four steps to wealth", published by Santillana. He is also a Yahoo! Finance writer. in Spanish on his weekly program "Conexión Dinero", and financial staff editor for Siempre Mujer's "Money Matters", published by Meredith Corporation.

Serbiá's columns are published by El Diario La Prensa of New York, El Nuevo Día, Puerto Rico, Ser Padres. For the International Center for Journalists, Xavier Serbiá was the instructor in online courses in Spanish on personal finance coverage for Hispanic journalists and journalists who cover US financial issues.

Serbia also launched xavierserbia.com, a financial site in Spanish. The site includes his opinions, videos, and questions and answers from a financial party.

In 2003, Serbiá was chosen by NBC-Telemundo and Ford to present the series "The Road to Triumph", in which he served as writer, advisor and presenter. He also appeared as a commentator on Telemundo (Noticiero Nacional), "NY Noticiero 47", "Mañana This" and "América en Vivo", "María Elvira Live", among others.

Serbiá also hosted a Spanish version of the game show Remote Control, named Control Remoto, for three months on Puerto Rican television's WAPA-TV during 1989. Mr. Serbiá has a master's degree in Economics from Trinity College and an MBA in Finance from Keller Graduate School of Management.

As an actor, Serbia acted in a sitcom named La Pensión de Doña Tere as well as on the teen musical comedy films Menudo: La Pelicula and Una aventura llamada Menudo, the two latter in which he shared credits with his fellow Menudo band members.

He left CNN in February 2023.

== Personal ==
Serbiá's first wife died. He is now married to an Argentine named Fabiana Uballes. He has one son.

== In pop culture ==
Serbia is played by Samu Jove in the 2020 Amazon Prime Video series based on Menudo, Subete A Mi Moto.

== Books ==
- Serbiá, Xavier (November 1, 2008). La riqueza en cuatro pisos (in Spanish). Aguilar. ISBN 978-1603962179.
- Serbiá, Xavier (April 29, 2011). Pregúntale a Xavier (in Spanish). Aguilar. ISBN 978-1616051945.

== Discography ==
=== With Menudo ===
- Es Navidad (1980)
- Fuego (1981)
- Xanadu (1981)
- Quiero Ser (1981)
- Por Amor (1982)
- Una aventura llamada Menudo (1982)
- Feliz Navidad (1982)

=== With Proyecto M ===
- Proyecto M (1987)

=== As a solo artist (as Xavier) ===
- Sere (1991)
- Para Siempre (1992)

== See also ==
- List of Puerto Ricans
