= Edgardo Díaz =

Panamanian-Puerto Rican music executive (born 1947)

- Born: 1947 (age 78–79); Panama City, Panamá Province, Panama
- Known for: Menudo

Edgardo Díaz Meléndez (born 1947) is a Puerto Rican music producer and songwriter. He is the creator of the "boy band" Menudo.

== Early life ==
Díaz was born in Panama City, Panama to Puerto Rican parents "Nacho" Diaz and his wife "Panchi", Díaz grew up in Miami, Florida.

== Career ==
Díaz moved to Spain after graduating from school and he worked with a group that was widely successful, La Pandilla, which had 4 boys and 1 girl, Mari Blanca, (now a Veterinarian in her home country), but after the La Pandilla members grew up, he moved back to Puerto Rico, and created Menudo. Díaz managed Menudo from 1977 to the group's era as MDO.

At the time he started to manage Menudo, Diaz was also the director of a young-adult oriented band named "Aquamarina".

In 2004, Díaz signed Daniela Lujan to manage the Mexican singer and actress' career.

== Personal ==
Diaz was once romantically linked to the Puerto Rican actress and singer Millie Aviles.

Diaz lived for two years in Ecuador.

== Allegations ==
Roy Rossello accused him of sexual abuse during a Brazilian reality show on 21 October 2014.

== In popular culture ==
Díaz was played by Braulio Castillo Jr. and by Yamil Urena in the 2020 Amazon Prime Video series based on Menudo, "Subete A Mi Moto".

In the sixth episode of Monsters: The Lyle and Erik Menendez Story, Diaz was portrayed by Hugo Medina.

== See also ==
- List of Panamanians
- List of Americans
- List of Puerto Ricans
- Tam Paton
