= Greatest Hits: 5th Anniversary =

Greatest hits album by MDO
- Released: April 2, 2002
- Recorded: 1997–2002
- Genre: Latin pop
- Label: Sony International

MDO chronology
| Little Piece of Heaven (2001) | Greatest Hits: 5th Anniversary (2002) | Otra Vez (2005) |

Singles from Greatest Hits: 5th Anniversary
- 1. "Me Huele A Soledad" Released: 2002

Greatest Hits: 5th Anniversary is the first compilation album by the Puerto Rican boy band MDO, released on April 2, 2002, under the Epic Records label. The group members at the time were Abel, Didier, Pablo, and Anthony.

The tracklist includes twelve songs (thirteen in the U.S. version, which included a remix version of "Me Huele a Soledad" as a bonus), all of which were featured on three MDO albums released between 1997 and 2000: MDO, Un Poco Más, and Subir Al Cielo. Additionally, two new songs were added: "Me Huele A Soledad" and "Ayudame A Olvidar."

== Production and tracks ==
The idea to record a greatest hits album came about because, according to Abel Talamántez, Didier Hernández, Pablo Portillo, and Anthony Galindo, the public was eager for a compilation of their favorite hits, and the band's fifth anniversary seemed like a perfect opportunity to release it. According to Abel: "Each song marks a stage of our lives, and we want to relive them with the audience."

The album brings together the hits from MDO's five years of existence, including two new songs: "Me huele a soledad," by Rudy Pérez and Roberto Livi, and "Ayúdame a olvidar," by Yasmil Marrufo, who also wrote "Te quise olvidar."

== Release and promotion ==
The album was released on April 4, 2002, at the Billboard Live nightclub in Miami, Florida, United States. On that occasion, the quartet received the keys to the city from Mayor Alex Penelas and an award from Miami-Dade County.

As part of the promotional campaign, the group organized a tour that would visit various locations, including Puerto Rico (at the Centro de Bellas Artes), New York, Miami, Washington, Panama, Texas, Los Angeles, San Diego, Chicago, Mexico, and Santo Domingo, as well as countries in Central America and South America.

This tour was the last project completed by the four members, who decided to leave MDO to pursue personal projects. Manager Edgardo Díaz stated that the tour was organized for the four artists to say goodbye to their fans. He explained: "It’s a fact that they are all leaving. On the 22nd (today) and 23rd, they will perform at the Centro de Bellas Artes in Puerto Rico, where they will begin their last tour together (...) These are personal reasons for some of them, and that’s why it was a unanimous decision among them, which was later agreed upon with the record label (Sony Music)."

== Singles ==
"Me huele a soledad" was released as the only promotional single for the album, also in 2002. The song reached prominent positions on various charts in Billboard, ranking at number four on Hot Latin Tracks, second on Latin Pop Airplay, and ninth on Latin Tropical/Salsa Airplay, consolidating its success across different genres and Latin audiences.

== Chart performance ==
The album debuted at number 44 on the Billboard Top Latin Albums chart, and peaked at number 26. On the Latin Pop Albums chart, it reached number 11.

== Track listing ==
| No. | Title | Writer(s) | Original album | Length |
|---|---|---|---|---|
| 1. | "Me Huele a Soledad" | R. Pérez, R. Liví | Unreleased track | 3:38 |
| 2. | "Ayúdame a Olvidar" | Yasmil Marrufo | Unreleased track | 4:27 |
| 3. | "Sin Ti" | Omar Alfanno | Subir Al Cielo | 3:22 |
| 4. | "Baila" | César Lemos, Karlo Aponte | Subir al cielo | 3:40 |
| 5. | "Déjame Subirte al Cielo" | Evan Rogers, Carl Sturken, W. Paz | Subir al cielo | 4:10 |
| 6. | "Te Quise Olvidar" | Yasmil Marrufo, Carlos Boutte | Subir al cielo | 4:20 |
| 7. | "No Puedo Olvidar (Pop)" | Abel Talamántez, Alexis Grullón, Tomás Torres | Un Poco Más | 4:27 |
| 8. | "Tú Me Haces Soñar" | Abel Talamántez, Alexis Grullón, Tomás Torres | Un poco más | 3:37 |
| 9. | "Dame un Poco Más" | Abel Talamántez, Alexis Grullón, Tomás Torres | Un poco más | 3:57 |
| 10. | "Ay Cariño" | Alejandro Jaén | MDO | 4:30 |
| 11. | "Volverás a Mí" | Alejandro Jaén, Ricardo Quijano | MDO | 4:10 |
| 12. | "No Puedo Olvidarme de Ti" | R. Pérez, R. Liví | MDO | 3:29 |
| 13. | "Me Huele a Soledad (Dance Remix)" | R. Pérez, R. Liví | Bonus track | 3:32 |

== Charts ==
| Chart (2002) | Peak position |
|---|---|
| US Top Latin Albums (Billboard) | 26 |
| US Latin Pop Albums (Billboard) | 11 |
