= DJ Kane discography =

- Studio albums: 3
- Singles: 22
- Music videos: 6

Mexican-American recording artist DJ Kane has released three studio albums and twenty-two singles, including three as a featured artist.

== Albums ==
=== Studio albums ===
Year	Album details
2004	DJ Kane: Released: March 23, 2004; Label: EMI Latin
2005	Capítulo II: Brinca: Released: September 13, 2005; Label: EMI Latin
2007	Capítulo III: Ahogando Penas: Released: March 20, 2007; Label: EMI Latin
"—" denotes a recording that did not chart or was not released in that territory.

== Singles ==
=== As lead artist ===
Year	Single	Album
2004	"La Negra Tomasa"	DJ Kane
2004	"Mía"	DJ Kane
2005	"Por Qué Esperaste"	Capítulo II: Brinca
2005	"Brinca"	Capítulo II: Brinca
2006	"Es Tan Bello"	Capítulo II: Brinca
2006	"Mueve la Cintura" (featuring Celso Piña)	Capítulo II: Brinca
2007	"Miéntele"	Capítulo III: Ahogando Penas
2007	"Muchacha Triste"	Capítulo III: Ahogando Penas
2009	"Cierra Tu Bocca"	No album
2009	"Adónde Te Vas"	No album
2010	"Linda Loca Mía"	No album
2010	"Vemos Que Vemos"	No album
2010	"Es a Ti"	No album
2010	"Siempre Conmigo"	No album
2011	"Contigo Me Voy" (with Ricky Rick)	No album
2011	"Con Todo Mi Corazón"	No album
2012	"Mi Stereo"	No album
2012	"Todo Estara Bien"	No album
2012	"Sin Tu Amor"	No album
"—" denotes a recording that did not chart or was not released in that territory.

=== As featured artist ===
Year	Single	Album
2000	"Abrázame y Bésame" (Jennifer Peña featuring DJ Kane)	Abrázame y Bésame
2006	"Sexy Lady" (MC Magic featuring DJ Kane)	Magic City
2011	"Peligro" (G&a Guayacol y Ale Nova featuring DJ Kane and Eunel)	No album
"—" denotes a recording that did not chart or was not released in that territory.

== Album appearances ==
- 2003: "The Gambler" (Emilio Navaira featuring DJ Kane)
- 2004: "Vicious" (Baby Bash featuring DJ Kane)
- 2005: "Break It Down" (A-Gee featuring DJ Kane)
- 2005: "Vuelves" (Chicos de Barrio featuring DJ Kane)
- 2008: "Sexy Lady (Remix)" (MC Magic featuring DJ Kane)
- 2008: "You Stole My Heart" (MC Magic featuring DJ Kane)
- 2008: "Perdoname Mamacita" (Ice featuring DJ Kane)
- 2008: "My Struggle" (Ice featuring DJ Kane)
- 2008: "Muevelo" (Ice featuring DJ Kane)
- 2008: "Down for You" (Ice featuring DJ Kane)
- 2008: "Mentirosa" (Ice featuring DJ Kane)
- 2009: "Moving On" (Johnny Smallz featuring DJ Kane)
- 2010: "Esta Noche" (El Lonely featuring DJ Kane)
- 2010: "Middle of the Night" (Lucky Luciano featuring DJ Kane)
- 2011: "Falsas Promesas" (MC Magic featuring DJ Kane and Herb G)
- 2011: "Amame" (Manny D Alesandro featuring DJ Kane)
- 2011: "Dame" (K1 featuring DJ Kane)
- 2012: "Mommy Said, No" (Dezi B featuring DJ Kane)
