= Talamantez =

Talamantez is a surname. Notable people with the surname include:

- Abel Talamantez (born 1978), Mexican American singer
- Esmi Talamantez, Tejano singer
- Inés Talamantez (1930–2019), Mescalero ethnographer and theologian
- Luis Talamantez, writer, poet, and prisoner's rights activist
