= Detras de tu Mirada =

Detrás De Tu Mirada

Studio album by Menudo
- Released: May 7, 1991
- Genre: Pop, Rock
- Label: Sony Music

Menudo chronology
No Me Corten El Pelo (1990)	Detrás De Tu Mirada (1991)	15 Años (1992)

Detrás de tu Mirada (Behind Your Gaze) is a studio album by the Puerto Rican boy band Menudo, released in 1991. The quintet included Abel Talamántez, Alexis Grullón, Andy Blázquez, and Ashley Ruiz.

The album was the first recording with the four new members, following the departure of Robert, Rawy, Edward, and Jonathan, who cited physical, psychological, and emotional abuse as their reasons for leaving. Although Edgardo Díaz, the group's manager, denied these allegations, the management decided to replace the former members with the new ones in an effort to stabilize Menudo.

== Commercial performance ==
According to La Opinion newspaper, the songs "Bésame En La Playa" and "Me Sigue Pareciendo Frío" reached top positions on Peruvian radio stations weeks before the group visited the country to promote their next album. In the United States, "Bésame En La Playa" reached number 26 on the Hot Latin Tracks chart by Billboard magazine.

== Critical reception ==
Regarding reviews from specialized music critics, AllMusic rated the album just one out of five stars but did not include any commentary.

== Tracklist ==
No.	Title	Writer(s)	Singer(s)	Length
1.	"Bésame En La Playa"	Fernando Osorio, Juan Carlos Pérez Soto	Adrián Olivares	2:53
2.	"Me Sigue Pareciendo Frío"	Fernando Osorio, Juan Carlos Pérez Soto	Ashley Ruiz	3:08
3.	"Déjame Ser"	Fernando Osorio	Alexis Grullón	3:04
4.	"Eres Tú"	Fernando Osorio, Juan Carlos Pérez Soto	Andy Blázquez	2:48
5.	"Besas Mi Alma"	Fernando Osorio	Abel Talamántez	2:57
6.	"Busco Algún Ángel"	Carlos Lara	Adrián Olivares	3:10
7.	"Hoy Sólo Quiero"	Fernando Osorio, Juan Carlos Pérez Soto	Alexis Grullón	2:40
8.	"La Chica De Al Lado"	Fernando Osorio, Juan Carlos Pérez Soto	Ashley Ruiz	3:11
9.	"Detrás De Tu Mirada"	Carlos Lara	Andy Blázquez	3:55
10.	"Sin Ti"	Fernando Osorio	Abel Talamántez	3:02
