= List of Billboard Latin Pop Airplay number ones of 2001 =

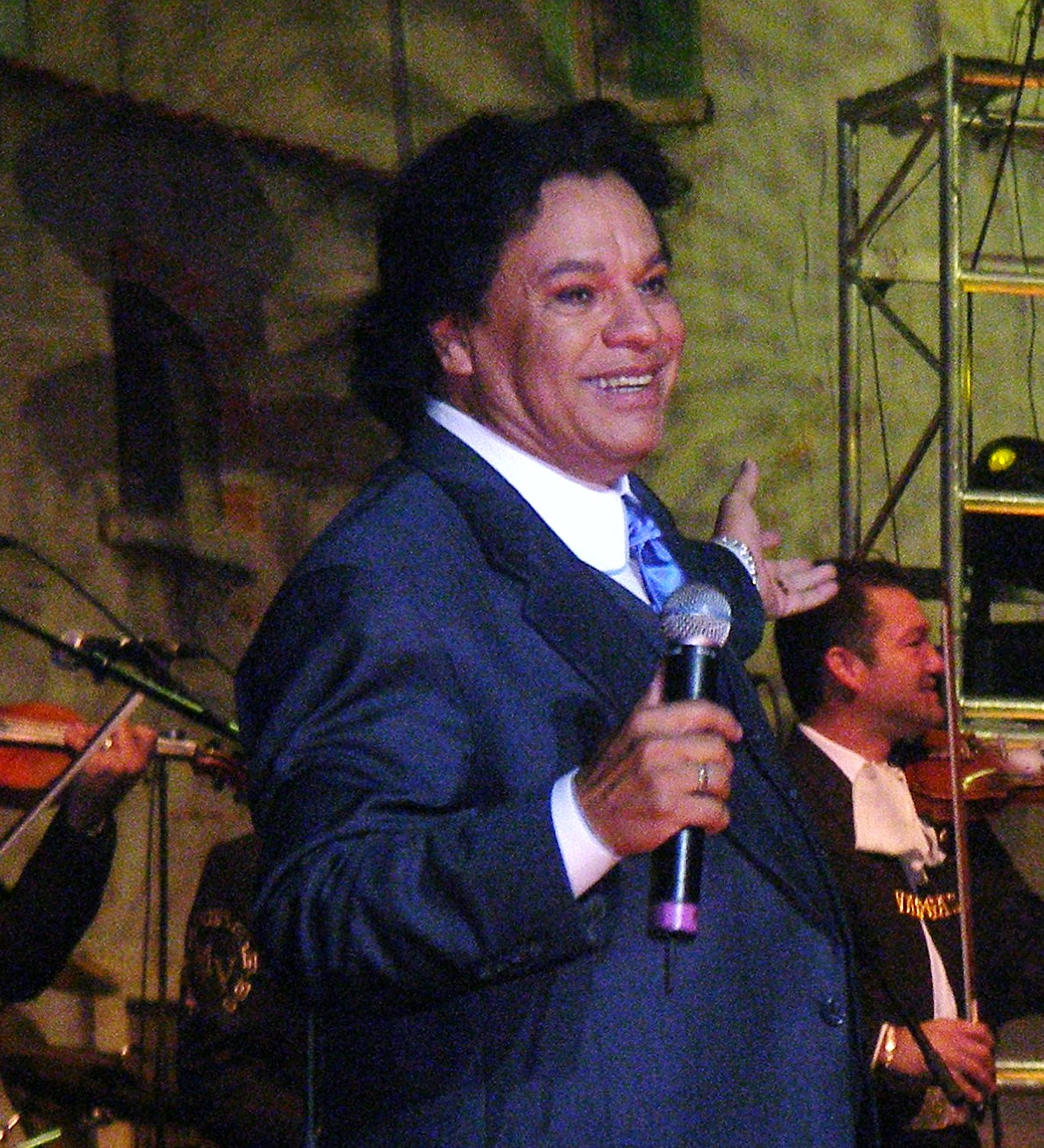
Mexican singer-songwriter Juan Gabriel (pictured in 2006) had the best-performing Latin pop song of the year with "Abrázame Muy Fuerte", which spent seven non-consecutive weeks at number one.

Latin Pop Airplay (formerly designated as Hot Latin Pop Tracks) is a chart published by Billboard magazine that ranks the top-performing songs (regardless of genre or language) on Latin pop radio stations in the United States, based on weekly airplay data compiled by Nielsen's Broadcast Data Systems. It is a subchart of Hot Latin Songs (formerly known as Hot Latin Tracks), which lists the best-performing Spanish-language songs in the country. In 2001, nine songs topped the chart in 52 issues of the magazine.

In the year's first issue of Billboard, the number one song was "Yo Te Amo" by Puerto Rican singer Chayanne, having been at the top since the issue dated November 11, 2000. It was replaced the following week by "Te Quise Olvidar" by Latin pop boy band MDO, originally written and performed by Venezuelan singer Carlos Baute. "Te Quise Olvidar" spent eight weeks on top of the chart.

Mexican singer-songwriter Juan Gabriel penned the track "Abrázame Muy Fuerte" for the 2000 Mexican telenovela of the same name. The song spent seven weeks on top of the chart and was named the best-performing Latin pop track of the year. Although Juan Gabriel had several number ones on the Hot Latin Songs since its inception in 1986, "Abrázame Muy Fuerte" was his only number one song on the Latin Pop Airplay chart. Puerto Rican singer Jerry Rivera achieved his only chart-topper on the Latin Pop Airplay chart with "Quiero". Its parent album, Rivera, marked a shift for the singer from performing salsa to ballads. Mexican singer Cristian Castro had the second longest-leading number one song of the year with 12 non-consecutive weeks with "Azul".

Three songs that topped the Latin Pop Airplay chart were Spanish-language versions of songs originally recorded in English: "Sólo Quiero Amarte" ("Nobody Wants to Be Lonely") by Ricky Martin, "Suerte" ("Whenever, Wherever") by Shakira, and "Héroe" ("Hero") by Enrique Iglesias. "Suerte" was the longest-leading song of the year on the Latin Pop Airplay chart with 13 non-consecutive weeks.

== Chart history ==
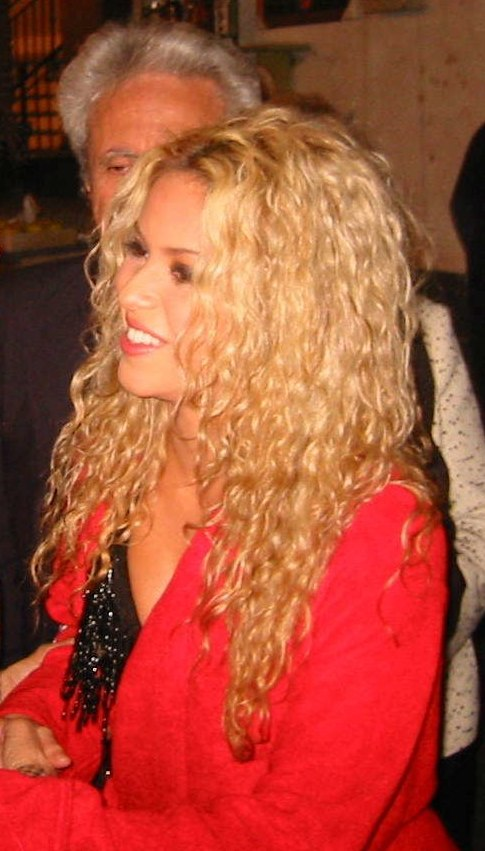
Colombian singer Shakira (pictured in 2003) had the longest-leading song of the year with "Suerte", the Spanish version of "Whenever, Wherever".

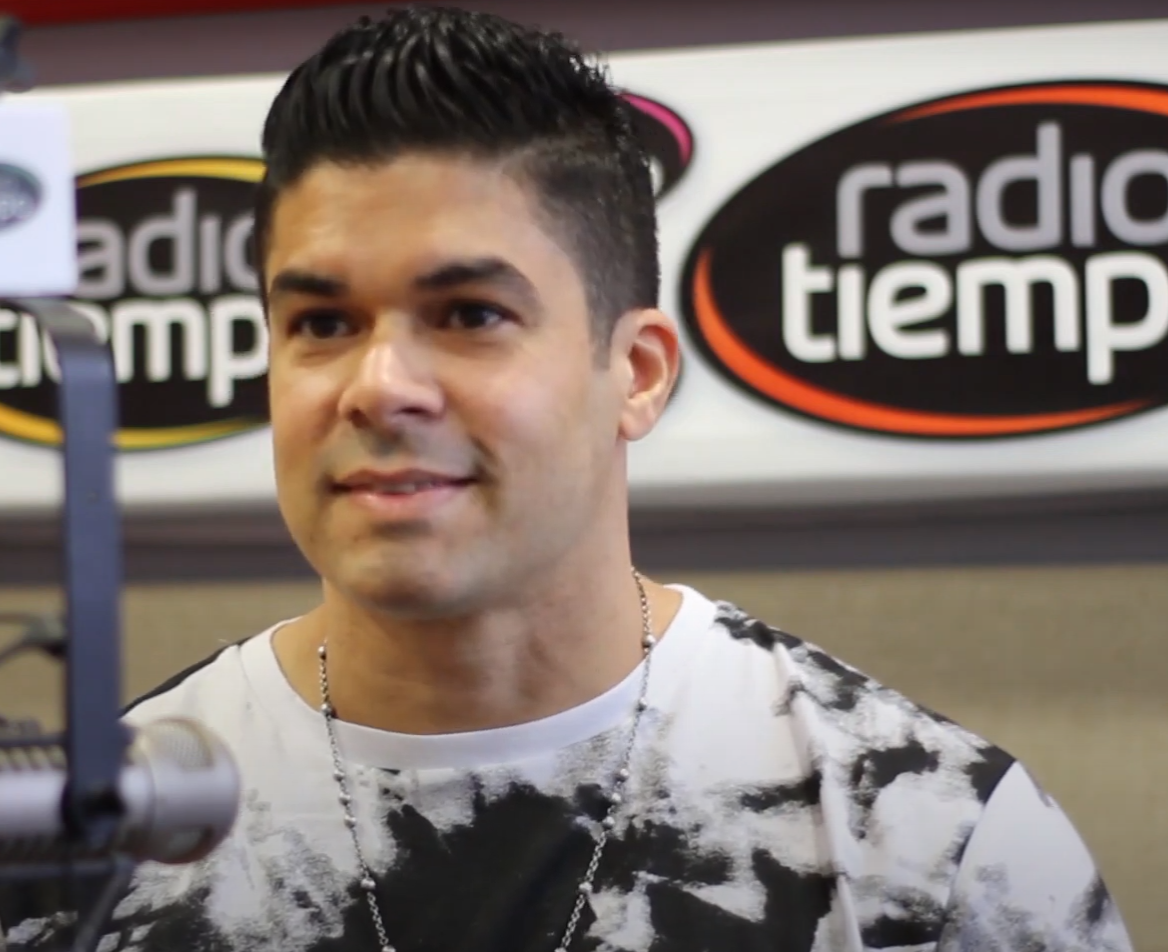
Puerto Rican singer Jerry Rivera (pictured in 2016) achieved his only chart-topper on the Latin Pop Airplay chart with "Quiero".

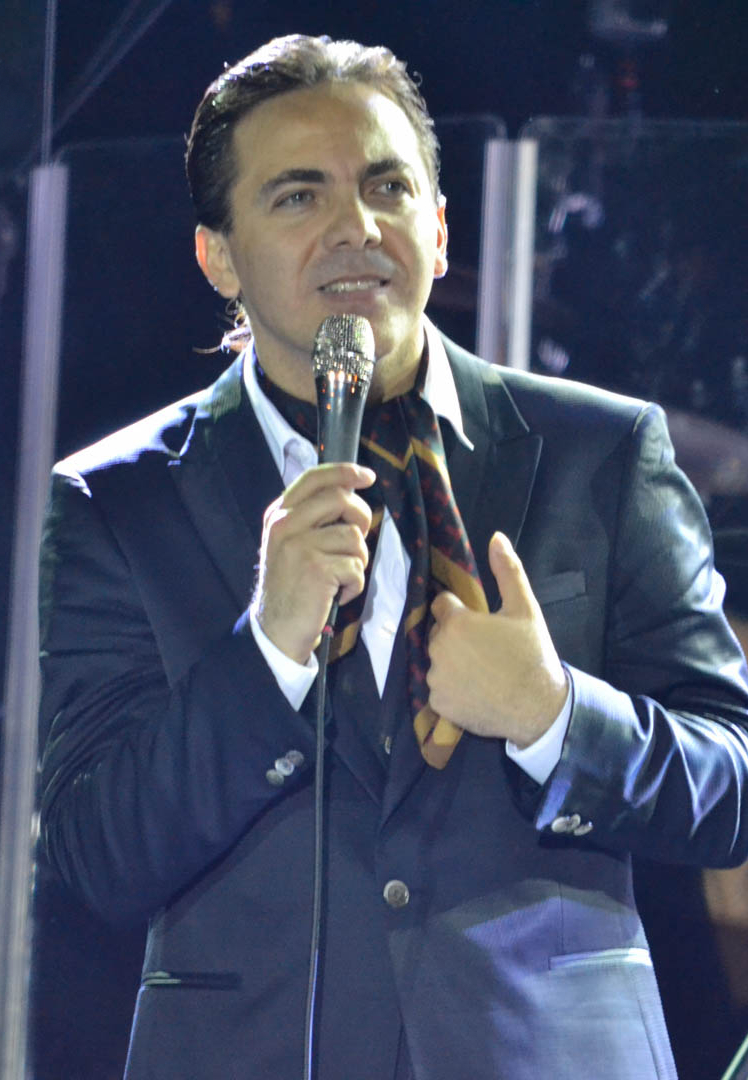
"Azul" by Mexican singer Cristian Castro (pictured in 2015) spent 12 non-consecutive weeks at number one.

Key
†	Indicates number 1 on Billboard's year-end Latin pop chart

Chart history
Issue date	Title	Artist(s)	Ref.
January 6	"Yo Te Amo"	Chayanne	
January 13	"Te Quisé Olvidar"	MDO	
January 20	"Te Quisé Olvidar"	MDO	
January 27	"Te Quisé Olvidar"	MDO	
February 3	"Te Quisé Olvidar"	MDO	
February 10	"Te Quisé Olvidar"	MDO	
February 17	"Te Quisé Olvidar"	MDO	
February 24	"Te Quisé Olvidar"	MDO	
March 3	"Te Quisé Olvidar"	MDO	
March 10	"Sólo Quiero Amarte"	Ricky Martin	
March 17	"Sólo Quiero Amarte"	Ricky Martin	
March 24	"Sólo Quiero Amarte"	Ricky Martin	
March 31	"Sólo Quiero Amarte"	Ricky Martin	
April 7	"Sólo Quiero Amarte"	Ricky Martin	
April 14	"Sólo Quiero Amarte"	Ricky Martin	
April 21	"Sólo Quiero Amarte"	Ricky Martin	
April 28	"Abrázame Muy Fuerte" †	Juan Gabriel	
May 5	"Abrázame Muy Fuerte" †	Juan Gabriel	
May 12	"Abrázame Muy Fuerte" †	Juan Gabriel	
May 19	"Abrázame Muy Fuerte" †	Juan Gabriel	
May 26	"Quiero"	Jerry Rivera	
June 2	"Abrázame Muy Fuerte" †	Juan Gabriel	
June 9	"Abrázame Muy Fuerte" †	Juan Gabriel	
June 16	"Azul"	Cristian Castro	
June 23	"Abrázame Muy Fuerte" †	Juan Gabriel	
June 30	"Azul"	Cristian Castro	
July 7	"Azul"	Cristian Castro	
July 14	"Azul"	Cristian Castro	
July 21	"Azul"	Cristian Castro	
July 28	"Azul"	Cristian Castro	
August 4	"Azul"	Cristian Castro	
August 11	"Azul"	Cristian Castro	
August 18	"Azul"	Cristian Castro	
August 25	"Azul"	Cristian Castro	
September 1	"Azul"	Cristian Castro	
September 8	"Cómo Se Cura una Herida"	Jaci Velasquez	
September 15	"Cómo Se Cura una Herida"	Jaci Velasquez	
September 22	"Azul"	Cristian Castro	
September 29	"Suerte"	Shakira	
October 6	"Suerte"	Shakira	
October 13	"Suerte"	Shakira	
October 20	"Suerte"	Shakira	
October 27	"Suerte"	Shakira	
November 3	"Suerte"	Shakira	
November 10	"Suerte"	Shakira	
November 17	"Suerte"	Shakira	
November 24	"Suerte"	Shakira	
December 1	"Suerte"	Shakira	
December 8	"Héroe"	Enrique Iglesias	
December 15	"Suerte"	Shakira	
December 22	"Suerte"	Shakira	
December 29	"Suerte"	Shakira	
