= Imagínate (Menudo album) =

Imagínate...

Studio album by Menudo
- Released: 1994
- Genre: Latin pop

Menudo chronology
Vem Pra Mim (1993)	Imagínate... (1994)	Tiempo de Amar (1996)

Imagínate... is a studio album by the Puerto Rican boy band Menudo, released in 1994. The album featured the members Abel Talamántez, Alexis Grullón, Andy Blázquez, Ashley Ruiz and Ricky López, and is the second album recorded by this line-up.

== Songs and promotion ==
While promoting the album in Peru, the song "Los Amigos y Las Amigas" was accused of plagiarism of the song "Los Patos y Las Patas" by singer Raúl Romero, a member of the group Los Nosequién y Los Nosecuántos. Edgardo Díaz, Menudo's manager, denied the accusations, stating that the term "plagiarism" was being misused, as the word "patas" was simply replaced with a synonym due to the pejorative use of the word "pato" in Puerto Rico.

The Peruvian authorities banned the distribution and commercialization of the song. This decision was made after a resolution by INDECOPI, which pointed out similarities in the title and content of the songs. The record label Discos Hispánicos in Peru was also prevented from distributing the song. Díaz claimed the controversy was an attempt at self-promotion by the singer. Romero allegedly demanded $20,000 to lift the ban on the song, but the request was denied.

The song "Mil Ángeles" was composed as a tribute to the young Peruvian Cecilia Huamán, who died in 1993 during a concert by the band. The music, written by Rawy Torres and Edgardo Díaz, reflects the impact of this loss not only on the fans but also on the group members, who visited Cecilia's family and grave as a gesture of condolences. Inspired by a letter and the emotions the teenager carried with her to the concert, the lyrics express the eternity of pure love and the hope of reunion, also symbolizing the emotional connection between artists and their admirers.

== Commercial performance ==
The album resulted in a success for the group on the radio, with the song "Yo Quiero Bailar Reggae" reaching the number one spot on the music chart in Panama.

== Tracklist ==
No.	Title	Writer(s)	Singer	Length
1.	"Yo Quiero Bailar Reggae"	David Choy	Abel Talamantez	4:10
2.	"Amor Mío"	Fernando Osorio	Alexis Grullón	3:20
3.	"Ay Que Dolor!"	Fernando Osorio	Ashley Ruiz	3:02
4.	"Tu Y Yo"	Jessica Zarango	Ricky López	4:02
5.	"Bienvenido Al Nuevo Mundo"	Carlos De Yarza	Andy Blázquez	4:09
6.	"Solo Faltas Tu"	Carlos De Yarza	Alexis Grullón	4:32
7.	"Tus Ojos"	Ashley Ruiz	Ashley Ruiz	4:40
8.	"Hombre Q' Sabia Demas"	Fernando Furteado, Samuel Rosa, Tavinho Paes (adapted by Luis Bascaran)	Abel Talamantez	4:13
9.	"Los Amigos Y Las Amigas"	Raul Romero	Andy Blázquez	3:17
10.	"De Don Juan A Romeo"	Jessica Zarango	Ricky López	3:26
11.	"Mil Ángeles"	Edgardo Diaz, Rawy Torres	Alexis Grullón and Ashley Ruiz	3:31
