= Todavía =

Todavía may refer to:

- "Todavía" (song), a 2009 song by Cruz Martínez y Los Super Reyes
- Todavía (album), a 2007 album by Mina
