= MDO (album) =

Studio album by MDO
- Released: July 1, 1997
- Recorded: 1996–97
- Genre: Pop rock
- Label: Sony International

MDO chronology
MDO (1997)	Un Poco Más (1999)

Singles from MDO
- 1. "No puedo olvidarme de ti" Released: 1997; 2. "Volveras a mi" Released: 1997; 3. "¡Ay amor!" Released: 1997; 4. "A bailar" Released: 1997; 5. "¡Ay cariño!" Released: 1998

MDO is the debut eponymous album of the Puerto Rican band MDO, which spun off Puerto Rican boy band Menudo. The group, which included Abel Talamántez, Alexis Grullón, Anthony Galindo, Didier Hernández and Daniel René Weider, embraced a new phase with this album, introducing new members and a more modern sound while maintaining the essence that had captured Latin audiences for two decades. The album featured a remake of Menudo's hit song "Súbete A Mi Moto".

The album performed well commercially, with singles like "No Puedo Olvidarme de Ti" and "Volverás a Mí" charting on the Billboard. It received positive reviews from music critics, who praised the refreshed sound and the group's ability to connect with younger audiences. In recognition of its success, the album was certified gold.

== Background and songs ==
The musical group Menudo, created in 1977 by Edgardo Díaz, became a Latin America phenomenon, and even after the departure of the original members, the dynamic and fresh essence of the group was maintained. To adapt to new generations, Menudo was reformulated in 1997 as MDO, bringing new members and a more modern approach, aiming to preserve the group's roots while strengthening its global image and maturing its style.

With members from different backgrounds — such as Didier Hernández, Daniel Weider, Alexis Grullón, Abel Talamántez, and Anthony Galindo — all aged between 15 and 19, MDO maintained the tradition of bringing together young boys, each with a distinct personality, allowing for greater identification and connection with the audience. In this context, the label Sony Music planned to release the artists' first studio album in the same year of the new formation.

The repertoire tracks combine pop, hip-hop, funk, and jazz, reflecting the transition to a more updated sound.

== Release and promotion ==
The album was released on November 25, 1997, the same day the 20th anniversary of Menudo’s launch was celebrated. The album’s promotion included a tour that passed through Mexico City and several neighboring provinces of the country.

== Singles ==
The singles from MDO performed notably on the music charts of Billboard magazine. The single "No Puedo Olvidarme de Ti," released in 1997, stood out particularly in the pop segment, reaching number six on the Latin Pop Airplay. It also reached number twenty-nine on the Hot Latin Tracks and number sixteen on the Latin Tropical/Salsa Airplay, showing its popularity across different audiences.

The song "Ay Amor," also from 1997, achieved notable positions on the charts, reaching number twenty-four on the Hot Latin Tracks, ninth on the Latin Pop Airplay, and fifteenth on the Latin Tropical/Salsa Airplay. Finally, "Volverás a Mí," released in 1998, consolidated the group’s success, reaching number eighteen on the Hot Latin Tracks, seventh on the Latin Pop Airplay, and eighth on the Latin Tropical/Salsa Airplay, confirming the public's receptiveness to the album's songs.

Other promotional singles include: "A Bailar," and "¡Ay Cariño!".

== Critical reception ==
Professional ratings
Review scores
Source	Rating
Billboard	Favorable
La Opinión	Favorable

The critic from Billboard magazine praised the album, highlighting it as an engaging musical fusion that recalls artists like Magneto, Boyzone, and Take That. According to the review, the quintet, with their pleasant and harmonious voices, delivers a vibrant collection of romantic pop/dance songs. The standout track was the rock-influenced "No Puedo Olvidarme de Ti," which, according to the critic, showed potential to become one of the top hits on Latin music charts.

Blanca Arroyo from La Opinión newspaper stated that there are no major differences between the songs on the MDO album and the previous songs of Menudo. She claimed that the ten songs are "fresh, young, cheerful, and especially aimed at a general audience," as they feature romantic ballads, rock, and some salsa and cumbia-rhythm tracks.

== Commercial performance ==
The album received a gold certification in the United States and Puerto Rico for combined sales of over 50,000 copies in both regions.

== Track listing ==
No.	Title	Writer(s)	Performer	Length
1.	"No Puedo Olvidarme De Ti"	Alejandro Jaén	Daniel René Weider	3:29
2.	"Volverás A Mí"	Alejandro Jaén, Ricardo Quijano	Abel Talamántez	4:37
3.	"¡Ay, Amor!"	Fernando Osorio	Alexis Grullón	2:54
4.	"¡Ay, Cariño!"	Alejandro Jaén	Abel Talamántez	4:30
5.	"No Me Envenena Más"	Fernando Osorio	Didier Hernández	3:20
6.	"A Bailar"	Alejandro Jaén, Denis Nieves, Carmen Bencomo	Alexis Grullón	5:22
7.	"Háblame De Amor"	Alejandro Jaén, Denis Nieves	Daniel René Weider and Anthony Galindo (Rap)	4:08
8.	"Súbete A Mi Moto"	Edgardo Díaz, Carlos Villa	Anthony Galindo	3:29
9.	"Así No Más"	Fernando Osorio	Didier Hernández	3:31
10.	"Dame Una Caricia"	Carlos Manuel Avilés, Miguel Díaz, Denis Nieves	Anthony Galindo	3:29

== Certifications ==
Region	Certification	Sales
United States; Puerto Rico	Gold	50,000^
