= Little Piece of Heaven (MDO album) =

Studio album by MDO

Studio album by MDO
- Released: August 28, 2001
- Recorded: 2000–2001
- Genre: Latin pop
- Label: Sony International

MDO chronology
Subir Al Cielo (2000)	Little Piece of Heaven (2001)	Greatest Hits: 5th Anniversary (2002)

Singles from Little Piece of Heaven
- 1. "Just A Little Piece Of Heaven" Released: 2001; 2. "My Love Was There All The Time" Released: 2002

Little Piece of Heaven is a studio album by the Puerto Rican boy band MDO, released in 2001 by Sony Discos. The lineup featured Abel Talamántez, Alexis Grullón, Didier Hernández, Pablo Portillo, and Caleb Avilés. The album includes tracks in English, some adapted from their previous album, Subir Al Cielo. The group aimed to ensure that the songs aligned with their style, blending Latin rhythms with romantic ballads and pop influences. The album addresses themes such as love, loss, and fun, and was promoted with a tour in Asia.

The critical reception was favorable, with praise for the vocal harmonies and the mix of styles, although some critics noted the predictability of certain melodies and lyrics.

== Production and recording ==
The album took two years to complete, as the members wanted to ensure the selection of songs was appropriate. It also needed to reflect their style. "This project took a bit longer to complete because we were also working on our Spanish album at the same time. We've reached a point in our career where we want to leave a mark. We felt it was the right time to show people who we are. We are mestizo, we are Latinos, and we wanted that to be reflected in our music," explained Talamantez.

The tracklist features eleven songs, six of which are English translations of tracks from their previous album, Subir Al Cielo, the group's fourth studio album, released in 2000. Altogether, the album contains eight English tracks where the artists primarily sing about being in love, losing love, desire, and having fun on the dance floor.

== Release and promotion ==
The group conducted a promotional tour across Asia to publicize the album, visiting countries such as Singapore, the Philippines, Indonesia, Malaysia, Thailand, and Taiwan. Abel, a group member, emphasized that the experience was a dream come true, while Caleb, the first Puerto Rican in the new lineup, acknowledged the challenge of winning over the Asian audience, particularly with Puerto Rico's recent prominence on the global stage after the Miss Universe victory.

Before their trip, the group filmed the music video for "Just a Little Piece of Heaven" in iconic locations around Miami, such as Mast Academy Beach and Brickell Avenue. The video premiered worldwide on TV Works in Singapore. With positive reception in the Philippines, the group even recorded two songs in the local language to be included in their next album, one of which was titled "Sana Maulit Muli" ("Hope It Happens Again" or "Let It Happen Again" in English).

The album was later released in non-Asian markets. Group member Didier Hernández said in an interview, "We've been doing pre-promotion for our English album. Visiting Asia was a dream for us, and we're excited to share our English record with the international audience." In 2002, the single "My Love Was There All The Time" was released in the United States.

== Critical reception ==
Professional ratings
Review scores
Source	Rating
Malay Mail	Favorable
New Straits Times	Performance: Sound:
Sunday Mail	Favorable

Regarding reviews from music critics, most were favorable.

Yushaimi 'Bazzboy' Yahaya of the Malay Mail highlighted tracks such as "Just A Little Piece of Heaven," comparing it to Marc Anthony's "I Need To Know," but with more energy, and "Es La Cosa," an excellent Latin dance track. He praised the vocal harmonies and noted that the album successfully blends various styles, including flamenco, salsa, and pop funk. According to him, songs like "So Hard To Forget" and "Tonight, Te Amare" are enjoyable and suggested that even those not fond of Latin music would still find the album appealing.

R.S. Murthi, a critic for the New Straits Times, stated that the Latin rhythms present in the songs managed to maintain the listener's interest but criticized the melodies and lyrics, describing them as market-tested clichés, which he claimed had become a hallmark of the world's most successful teen pop bands. He rated both the group's performance and the album's sound with two out of five stars.

Gerald Martinez of the Sunday Mail described the work as a mix of vibrant Latin rhythms, romantic ballads, and hip-hop influences. He highlighted the group's refined vocal harmonies and recommended the album to fans of boy bands with a South American twist.

== Track listing ==
No.	Title	Length
1.	"Just A Little Piece Of Heaven"	4:12
2.	"Es La Cosa"	3:59
3.	"Baila"	3:10
4.	"So Hard To Forget"	4:23
5.	"Lock All The Doors"	3:55
6.	"Someone Help Me"	3:54
7.	"Tonight, Te Amare"	3:32
8.	"Something About You"	3:37
9.	"My Love Was There All The Time"	3:31
10.	"An Angel Cries"	4:11
11.	"Magic Carpet Ride"	3:29
