= Sabe A Ti =

Studio album by MDO
- Released: February 12, 2008
- Genre: Pop rock
- Label: Machete Music

MDO chronology
| Otra Vez (2005) | Sabe A Ti (2008) |

Singles from Sabe A Ti
- 1. "No queda nada" Released: 2008

Sabe A Ti is a studio album by the Puerto Rican boy band MDO, released in 2008 by Machete Music. The lineup included * Daniel Rodríguez, Elliot Suro, Luis Montes and Lorenzo Duarte. The album was produced by Carlos Pauca and Pablo de Laloza.

To promote the album, the group embarked on a promotional tour, planning to visit countries such as Puerto Rico, Miami, Mexico, El Salvador, and other Latin American nations.

The album's sole single was the track "No Que Nada," released in 2008, which achieved modest positions on Billboard charts, including Hot Latin Songs and Latin Pop Airplay. It received favorable reviews, with notable praise from Evan C. Gutierrez of AllMusic, who highlighted the vocal harmonies and technical execution, and Mario Tarradell of The Press Democrat, who emphasized the album's maturity compared to earlier releases.

== Background ==
In 2007, the Making Menudo program on MTV selected new members to revitalize the concept of the iconic youth group that had been a musical phenomenon in the 1980s. However, this new formation had no connection to Edgardo Díaz, the original creator of Menudo and MDO. Interestingly, it was created while MDO, considered a natural evolution of Menudo with only a name adjustment, still existed as a separate entity. (Note: The Menudo group, founded in 1977 in Puerto Rico, was initially formed under the leadership of Edgardo Díaz. It became a global phenomenon, influencing other boy bands. However, during the 1990s, it faced a severe crisis due to allegations of child abuse and drug use involving some members. In 1996, in an attempt to renew its image, the group underwent a radical change. It transitioned from being composed of boys aged 12 to 16 to featuring members over 18. This transformation included dropping the letters "e-n-u" from the Menudo name, becoming MDO, marking a new chapter in its trajectory.) Díaz, meanwhile, managed to sign with another label for MDO, bringing the group back to public attention. Around this time, the new Menudo released an EP with four tracks, two in Spanish and two in English.

Given the concurrent releases, comparisons arose with MDO, though the group denied any rivalry. Lorenzo Duarte, an MDO member, stated in an interview: "First of all, I believe there is room for everyone (...) MDO has had an impeccable trajectory since launching its first album (...) We stand out for making good music. And we are the originals. We are the second generation, but we are the originals. As for Menudo, we wish them the best. They are younger; we are more mature. Their music is another proposition, in the American R&B style, and they will try to adapt it to Spanish as well."

== Production and recording ==
The album was produced by Carlos Pauca and Pablo de Laloza, along with Alejandro Jaén, renowned producers who have collaborated on musical projects for artists such as Shakira, Santana, Enrique Iglesias, and American singer-songwriter Jewel, among others. Unlike previous versions, the band members play their own instruments and actively participate in the creative process, bringing authenticity to the work. During the recordings, Luis played percussion, Daniel and Elliot played guitars, and Lorenzo played piano and guitar.

The tracklist includes a cover version of "Solo pienso en ti," a song performed by Venezuelan actor Guillermo Dávila in the telenovela Ligia Elena (1982). According to Lorenzo: "The arrangement feels very modern (...) Elliot took the lead on this song, while I took on 'Soy como soy'." He further added that the album aimed to showcase each member's vocal maturity, saying, "Besides bringing more mature lyrics, there was a shift in concept and sound. It's less 'orchestrated,' more pop rock, with more electric guitars and drums. This change is noticeable in songs like 'Mi corazón,' 'Si me quisieras,' and 'Quién.' It's a more natural album," explained Lorenzo.

== Singles ==
Only one song was released as a single, the track "No que nada," which was released in 2008 as a promo CD. On the Billboard Hot Latin Songs chart, it debuted at number 47 on March 8, 2008, and peaked at number 44 on April 5 of the same year. On the Latin Pop Airplay chart, also from Billboard, it reached number 16.

On the "Latin Pop" chart by Radio & Records, it debuted at number 37 on February 22, 2008, reaching its peak on March 7, 2008, at number 28.

== Critical reception ==
Professional ratings
Review scores
| Source | Rating |
|---|---|
| AllMusic | 3.5/5 stars |
| The Press Democrat | Favorable |

The reviews from specialized music critics were favorable.

Evan C. Gutierrez, a critic from the site AllMusic, rated the album three and a half out of five stars and stated that the album's technical quality is evident. According to him, the vocal harmonies are well-crafted, and the musical arrangements are flawlessly executed. However, he noted that although the album is solid and free of bad tracks, the group sacrificed personality in favor of perfection. Additionally, he observed that the album's style sounded dated for the North American audience but considered this characteristic common in the genre. He concluded that while the album is not exceptional, it is consistent and serves its purpose well.

In a report for The Press Democrat, Mario Tarradell wrote that the album aimed to erase the image most people had of "cute boys singing and dancing." He stated that the album features refined pop songs written by seasoned musicians from the Latin music scene. Tarradell also noted that the work has a more mature tone compared to its predecessors while still using musical formulas that appeal to young audiences.

== Track listing ==
Sabe a Ti
| No. | Title | Length |
|---|---|---|
| 1. | "Si Me Quisieras" | 3:41 |
| 2. | "Sabe A Tí" | 3:54 |
| 3. | "Quien" | 4:25 |
| 4. | "No Queda Nada" | 3:47 |
| 5. | "Mi Corazón" | 3:06 |
| 6. | "Dime Cuando y Donde" | 3:26 |
| 7. | "Si Tuviera Que Decidir" | 3:58 |
| 8. | "Soy Como Soy" | 3:40 |
| 9. | "Solo Pienso En Tí" | 3:10 |
| 10. | "Una Noche De Amor" | 3:51 |
| 11. | "Condenado" | 4:39 |
