= Imagínate =

Imagínate may refer to:

- Imagínate (Menudo album), 1994
- Imaginate (Taxiride album), 1999
- Imagínate, a 1999 album by Charlie Cruz
- Imaginate, a 1999 album by Raúl Paz, originally Cuba Libre
- "Imagínate" (song), a 2009 song by Wisin & Yandel
- "Imagínate", a song by Salvador Beltrán
- "Imagínate", a 1976 song by Omar Franco
- Imagínate, a Colombian television series
