= 15 Años =

15 Años (Spanish "quince años") or 15 Anos (Portuguese: "quinze anos") may refer to:

- Quinceañera, a Latino-American celebration of the coming of age of a 15-year-old girl
- 15 Años (album), a 1992 album by Menudo
- 15 años (Pastora Soler album), a 2010 album by Pastora Soler
- 15 años, a 1998 album by Juan Carlos Baglietto
- 15 Anos, a 2008 album by Pólo Norte
