= Vem Pra Mim =

1993 studio album by Menudo

Studio album by Menudo
- Released: 1993
- Studio: PolyGram
- Genre: Latin Pop

Menudo chronology
15 Años (1992)	Vem Pra Mim (1993)	Imagínate... (1994)

Vem Pra Mim is the fifth and final album in Portuguese-language album by the Puerto Rican group Menudo, released by PolyGram in 1993. The record marked a transitional moment for the band, introducing a new lineup that included Abel Talamántez, Alexis Grullón, Andy Blázquez, Ashley Ruiz, and Ricky López, who replaced Adrián Olivares.

Continuing Menudo's efforts to reach Brazilian audiences, the album features twelve tracks, most of them Portuguese versions of songs previously recorded in Spanish. Among its highlights is “Eu Só Queria,” which features a guest appearance by Brazilian television presenter Mylla Christie.

== Album details ==
This was the only album performed by the lineup composed of Abel Talamántez, Alexis Grullón, Andy Blázquez, Ashley Ruiz, and new member Ricky López. Ricky replaced Adrián Olivares, who decided to leave the group.

The album features 12 tracks, including Portuguese versions of songs originally recorded in Spanish by other Menudo lineups. The track "Eu Só Queria" includes a special guest appearance by Brazilian TV host Mylla Christie, known for hosting the TV show Clube da Criança on Rede Manchete. Her participation was recorded in October 1993. Additionally, two songs from the Sombras & Figuras album, released in 1988, were adapted into Portuguese: "Serenata Rock'N Roll" (also featured on the Os Ultimos Herois album released in 1990) with new lyrics, and "Gafas Oscuras."

== Promotion ==
To promote the album, Menudo appeared on Brazilian TV shows such as the Programa Sula Miranda on Record. The track "Juras De Amor" was released as a single. In 1994, the group also toured Brazil, performing in Rio de Janeiro and São Paulo.

== Critical reception ==
In a report on the group and the album, Simone do Vale from the newspaper Folha de Boa Vista remarked that the album's songs are "syrupy and sentimental like those of the past." However, she emphasized that the new members' popularity compensated: "the new Menudo members are cute, charming, and intelligent.”

== Tracklist ==
No.	Title	Writer(s)	Singer(s)	Length
1.	"Vem Pra Mim" (Búscame)	M. Vendrel, A. Soler, version: Edgard Pacas	Alexis Grullon	5:41
2.	"Juras de Amor" (Lo Que Juramos)	Fernando Osorio, version: Carlos Colla	Ashley Ruiz	3:01
3.	"Parecendo Frio" (Me Sigue Pareciendo Frío)	Fernando Osorio	Ashley Ruiz	3:07
4.	"Quinze Anos" (Quince Años)	Juan Carlos Perez Soto, version: Carlos Colla	Alexis Grullon	3:50
5.	"Beija Minha Alma" (Besas Mi Alma)	Fernando Osorio, version: Edgard Pacas	Abel Talamantez	3:26
6.	"Nunca Mais" (No Volveras A Ocurrir)	Jesus Monarrez, version: Carlos Colla	Ricky Lopez	3:00
7.	"Eu Só Queria" (Hoy Solo Quiero)	Fernando Osorio, Juan Carlos Perez Soto, version: Carlos Colla	Alexis Grullon, Mylla Christie	3:04
8.	"Raio de Lua" (Bajo La Luna)	Carlos Lara, Tino Geiser, version: Carlos Colla	Ricky Lopez	3:17
9.	"Lentes Escuras" (Gafas Oscuras)	Pedro Gely, version: Edgard Pacas	Andy Blázquez	3:54
10.	"Me Beija Aqui na Praia" (Besame En La Playa)	Fernando Osorio, Juan Carlos Perez Soto, version: Edgard Pacas	Ashley Ruiz	3:42
11.	"Serenata Rock'N Roll" (Serenata Rock'N Roll)	Pedro Gely, version: Carlos Colla	Abel Talamantez	3:25
12.	"Deixa Eu Ser" (Dejame Ser)	Fernando Osorio, version: Carlos Colla	Andy Blázquez	3:46
Total length:				43:22

== Personnel ==
Credits adapted from Vem Pra Mim LP (catalog no. Philips – 992 830–1).

Menudo

- Andy Blázquez – vocals
- Ashley Ruiz – vocals
- Ricky López – vocals
- Alexis Grullón – vocals
- Abel Talamántez – vocals

Additional personnel

- Mylla Christie – guest vocals on “Eu Só Queria”
- Carlos Ponce, Edgardo Díaz, Eugenio Hernández – producers
- Walter Cotto – engineer
- George Guerra – engineer
- Alfredo Abreu Pinto – assistant engineer
- Ricardo Núñez – assistant engineer
- Mixed at: West Indies Studio (San Juan, Puerto Rico)
- Mastered at: Sterling Sound (New York, U.S.)
- Photography – Espino Díaz
- Makeup – Mayda Aponte
- Hair – Myrta Colón
- Art direction – Myrta Colón
- Coordination – Guido Lemos
