= Troy Curtis =

American actor (born 1980)

- Born: Troy Tuminelli; December 30, 1980 (age 45); Danbury, Connecticut, U.S.
- Occupations: Singer, actor
- Height: 6 ft 2 in (188 cm)
- Website: troycurtisent.com

Troy Curtis (born Troy Tuminelli, December 30, 1980) is an actor, singer, and entrepreneur.

== Early music career ==
In 2000, Curtis joined the boy band Menudo as the first non-Spanish speaking member, during their MDO era, under the name Troy Kurtis. Curtis helped make their single "Te Quise Olvidar" a hit on the top of Billboard's Hot Latin Tracks, from their album Subir al Cielo. He has performed with Christina Aguilera, The Backstreet Boys, Cheyenne, and Celia Cruz.

== Actor and performer ==
After leaving MDO in 2001, Curtis was signed to play Nico Castaneda in Guiding Light, also credited as Troy Kurtis. Curtis was featured in this role for 86 episodes. He was responsible for writing and singing all of the songs featured on the show during his time there.

Following Curtis's role on the soap opera, he landed the lead role of Job in the off-Broadway production of Job and the Snake. In 2007, Curtis began writing and producing music for himself.

In 2000, Curtis formed Premier Talent Entertainment, producing creative and special events catering to all occasions. In 2011, he performed at Kim Kardashian's wedding to Kris Humphries. His band played for Oprah Winfrey: Legends Who Paved the Way.

In 2012, he formed Troy Curtis Entertainment as an umbrella company for acting and entertainment. It was during this time that he performed on X Factor.
