= Tick Tock (band) =

Former Puerto Rican boy band, active 2004–06

- Origin: Puerto Rico
- Genres: Pop; rock; balada; reggaeton
- Years active: 2004–06
- Past members: Geraldo Darien Nieves Martínez; John José Muñiz González; Joseph Alicea López; Luis Miguel Pavón Montes

Tick Tock was a music group from Puerto Rico. They were active for only two years (2004–06). Their Puerto Rican fans knew them as a younger version of Menudo since they covered some of their songs like Sube a mi Motora, Claridad and more. They also covered the song "Bidi Bidi Bom Bom" from Selena with a few adjustments. The traditional song "Burrito Savanero" they covered with a twist and a few adjustments. They also appeared in local educational shows in Puerto Rico, singing "Sube a mi Motora", "Contigo Se Irá", "Ven al baile" and "Boogie Boogie". They released two albums, Tick Tock Marcando el Ritmo and Tick Tock Marcando el Reggetón. They also appeared on Espectacular 2006 on Univision where they sang a medley of songs by Menudo and Descorazonado. After the band's dissolvement, one of the members, Joseph Alicea López, became a vocalist for Los Super Reyes under the stage name Jo-Joe from 2007 to 2010.

Their song "Yo Soy Boricua" became a cultural anthem to Puerto Ricans, with the lyrics "Yo soy Boricua, pa' que tú lo sepas", which loosely translates to "I am Boricua, for you to be aware". The lyrics became a very popular phrase to display Puerto Rican culture and pride, mainly in public activities.

== Discography ==
=== Marcando el Ritmo ===
Track	Title	Translation	Notes
01	Yo Soy Boricua	I am Boricua	
02	Dime Que Si	Say Yes	
03	Ven Al Baile	Come to the Dance	
04	Descorazonado	Disheartened	
05	Te Quiero Más	I Love You More	
06	Bidi Bidi Bom Bom	Bidi Bidi Bom Bom	
07	Boogie Boogie	Boogie Boogie	Bonus Track
08	Pass the Dutchie	Pass the Dutchie	
09	Siento/Baka Lana Nu Meme	I feel/Baka Lana Nu Meme	
