= Otra Vez (MDO album) =

Studio album by MDO
- Released: January 25, 2005
- Recorded: 2004–05
- Genre: Pop; Rock
- Label: Ole Music

MDO chronology
Greatest Hits: 5th Anniversary (2002)	Otra Vez (2005)	Sabe A Ti (2008)

Singles from Otra Vez
- 1. "Otra Vez" Released: 2005

Otra Vez is a studio album by the Puerto Rican boy band MDO, released in 2005 by the record label OLE Music. Produced by Alejandro Jaén and recorded between Miami and Puerto Rico, the album includes ten tracks that range from emotional ballads to upbeat songs, blending genres such as rock, ska, and Caribbean rhythms. The lineup featured Daniel Rodríguez, Elliot Suro, Luis Montes, Lorenzo Duarte.

The album's promotion included a tour through several countries, with standout performances and a music video filmed at Puerto Rico's urban train stations. Commercially, Otra Vez was well-received, debuting in significant positions on Latin charts and reaching second place on the Latin Pop Albums chart. The success earned the group gold certifications in the United States and Mexico.

An acoustic version of the album was released in the same year, titled Onda Acustica.

== Production and recording ==
The album was produced by Alejandro Jaén and recorded at studios located in Miami and Puerto Rico. The production features a selection of ten tracks that explore various emotions and experiences, with a focus on ballads and upbeat songs. The genres explored include fusions of rock, ska, and Caribbean rhythms, which enhance the musical diversity of the record. The team of songwriters includes names such as Rudy Pérez, Roberto Livi, Jorge Luis Piloto, Fernando Osorio, Juan Carlos Pérez Soto, and Rayito, who contributed to crafting lyrics and melodies filled with emotion.

== Release and promotion ==
The album was released on January 25 under the OLE Music label. Promotional efforts included an extensive tour through countries like the Dominican Republic, Honduras, Miami, and Puerto Rico, with standout performances such as at the "Festi Juventud" alongside artists like Shalim and Don Omar.

The tour also visited locations such as El Salvador, Philadelphia, New York, Los Angeles, and Washington, D.C. MDO's performances highlighted their vocal skills, especially those of Luis Montes, and included the use of instruments like guitars, played by some members.

== Singles ==
Only one single was released to promote the album: the song "Otra vez". Released in 2005, the track appeared on two of Billboard magazine's music charts: the Hot Latin Tracks, where it peaked at number 10, and the Latin Pop Airplay chart, where it reached number 6 for two consecutive weeks. The song was also featured in the soundtrack of the telenovela Juana la virgen, aired by Univisión Puerto Rico.

The music video was directed by the group's manager and creator, Edgardo Díaz, and filmed over two days at the facilities of the urban train in Puerto Rico. Filming took place at various stations, such as Cupey, Universidad, and Jardines, highlighting public artworks that adorn the area, including the mural "Mi Río Piedras" and the murals "Esporas" by Edgardo Rodríguez Luiggie and "Enpapelando la Ciudad" by Eric Shroeder Vivas. Unlike narrative-driven music videos, this one focuses on the individual performances of the group members, lacking a central storyline but emphasizing the visual presentation of the group. Angie Cortés, a finalist in the "Chica MDO" contest, makes a special guest appearance in the video.

== Onda Acustica ==
In the same year as the album's release, OLE Music launched a special edition titled Onda Acustica featuring eight of the ten tracks in acoustic versions, along with a DVD that included the Otra Vez EPK, two music videos, and a photo gallery.

== Commercial performance ==
Commercially, the album also achieved success. On February 12, 2005, it debuted on the music chart Top Latin Albums, published by Billboard magazine, at position number 56. It eventually peaked at position number 12 on this chart. On the Latin Pop Albums chart, it reached position number 2.

Regarding sales awards, the CD was certified gold in the United States. In Mexico, they received the award from José Luis Rodríguez and María Inés Guerra on the program Disco de Oro, broadcast by TV Azteca.

== Track listing ==
Otra vez
No.	Title	Writer(s)	Length
1.	"Otra Vez"	Y. Marrufo, S. Primera
2.	"Para tu Olvido"	W. Paz, A. Rayo Gibo
3.	"Eso Es"	F. Osorio, J.C. Perez Soto
4.	"Este Loco"	W. Paz, R. Vergara
5.	"La Voy a Buscar"	R. Perez
6.	"Si Tu No Estas"	A. Jaen, E. Ender
7.	"Al Menos Yo"	Y. Marrufo, D. Sanz
8.	"No Es Demasiado Tarde"	J.L. Piloto, M. Succetti
9.	"Maldita Luna"	J. Diez, R. Vergara
10.	"Ella"	Y. Marrufo, Jesus Hidalgo, Janio Hidalgo, Jamie Hidalgo

Onda Acústica (CD)
No.	Title	Writer(s)	Length
1.	"Este Loco"	W. Paz, R. Vergara	3:43
2.	"Lo Que Juramos"		3:03
3.	"Otra Vez"	Y. Marrufo, S. Primera	3:53
4.	"Maldita Luna"	J. Diez, R. Vergara	4:03
5.	"La Voy a Buscar"	R. Perez	3:39
6.	"Al Menos Yo"	Y. Marrufo, D. Sanz	3:27
7.	"Para Tu Olvido"	W. Paz, A. Rayo Gibo	4:42
8.	"Como Hago Sin Ti"		4:42
9.	"No Es Demasiado Tarde"	J.L. Piloto, M. Succetti	3:56
10.	"Eso Es"	F. Osorio, J.C. Perez Soto	3:40

Onda Acústica (DVD)
No.	Title	Length
1.	"Al Menos Yo" (Music video)	3:29
2.	"Otra Vez" (Music video)	3:55
3.	"EPK "Otra Vez"" (Documentary)	4:08
4.	"Photo Gallery"

== Charts ==
Chart (2005)	Peak position
United States (Billboard Top Latin Albums)	12
United States (Billboard Latin Pop Albums)	2
United States (Billboard Top Heatseekers)	22

== Certifications ==
Region	Certification	Certified Sales
United States; Puerto Rico	Gold	50,000^
Mexico	Gold	50,000^
