= No Puedo Olvidar =

Single by MDO

from the album Un Poco Más
- Released: 1999
- Studio: Extreme Music, MÝsica Futura
- Genre: Latin pop
- Length: 4:32 (pop version); 3:39 (ballad version)
- Label: Sony Discos
- Songwriters: Tomás Torres; Abel Talamantez; Alexis Grullón
- Producers: Alejandro Jaen; Lewis Martinee; Denis Nieves

MDO singles chronology
"Dame un Poco Más" (1999)	"No Puedo Olvidar" (1999)	"Tu Me Haces Soñar" (1999)

"No Puedo Olvidar" ("I Can't Forget") is a song by Latin pop boy band MDO from their second studio album Un Poco Más (1999). It was released as the second single from the album in 1999. The track became their first number one on both the Hot Latin Songs and Latin Pop Airplay charts in the United States. Two versions of the song were recorded, one in pop and one in ballad.

== Charts ==
Weekly chart positions for "No Puedo Olvidar"
Chart (1999)	Peak position
Guatemala (Notimex)	3
Panama (Notimex)	1
US Hot Latin Songs (Billboard)	1
US Latin Pop Airplay (Billboard)	1

== See also ==
- List of number-one Billboard Hot Latin Tracks of 1999
- List of Billboard Latin Pop Airplay number ones of 1999
