= El Regreso de los Reyes =

Studio album by Cruz Martínez y Los Super Reyes
- Released: August 14, 2007
- Recorded: 2007
- Genre: Cumbia
- Length: 50:55
- Label: Warner Music Latina
- Producer: Cruz Martínez

Cruz Martínez y Los Super Reyes chronology
El Regreso de los Reyes (2007)	Cumbia con Soul (2009)

Edición Real

Singles from El Regreso de los Reyes
- 1. "Muévelo" Released: June 19, 2007; 2. "Serenata (Estrellita Mía)" Released: October 2007; 3. "Muchacha Triste" Released: April 2008; 4. "Yo Seré" Released: August 1, 2008

El Regreso de los Reyes (English: The Return of the Kings) is the debut studio album by Mexican-American cumbia group Cruz Martínez y Los Super Reyes. It was released on August 14, 2007, by Warner Music Latina. The royal edition (Spanish: edición real) was released on September 16, 2008. It has all the songs from the standard edition except for "Roses". It includes two remixes for "Muévelo" and two remixes for "Si Pudiera". It came with a DVD that includes the music videos for "Muévelo", "Serenata (Estrellita Mía)", "Muchacha Triste", and "Yo Seré". The album reached #130 on the United States Billboard 200 chart, and #3 on the United States Billboard Latin chart.

== Track listing ==
No.	Title	Writer(s)	Length
1.	"Muévelo"	Cruz Martínez, Jimmy Gómez, Marcos Sifuentes, Tony Butler, Byron Smith, Garfield Baker	3:54
2.	"Oye Mi Amor" (featuring Magic Juan)	Cruz Martínez, Magic Juan, Abel Talamantez	3:43
3.	"Nada Nos Va a Separar"	Claudia Brant, Andrew Thomas	4:02
4.	"Serenata (Estrellita Mía)"	Cruz Martínez, Alicia Villarreal	3:25
5.	"Mírame (No Controles)"	Cruz Martínez, Abel Talamantez, Marcos Sifuentes, Fernando Domínguez	3:25
6.	"Si Pudiera"	Cruz Martínez, Obie Bermúdez	3:19
7.	"Interlude – Yo Seré"		0:22
8.	"Yo Seré" (featuring Slim, Megga, Pryme Status and Big Metra)	Cruz Martinez, Abel Talamantez, Pryme Status, Fernando Domínguez	4:07
9.	"El Rey" (featuring Megga, Menor and Big Metra)	José Alfredo Jiménez	4:07
10.	"Outro – You Gonna Lose"		0:56
11.	"Muchacha Triste" (featuring Dax "El Coyote")	Luis Alva	3:26
12.	"Roses"	Fernando Domínguez, Eric Harper	4:16
13.	"La Neta" (featuring Zion)	Cruz Martínez, Félix Ortiz, Frank Pangelinan	3:31
14.	"Quédate Más (I Want You Back)"	Berry Gordy Jr., Freddie Perren, Deke Richards, Alphonzo Mizell	3:27
15.	"Perfect Girl" (featuring Frankie J and Damon Reel)	Cruz Martínez, Frankie J. Bautista, Brian Stone	3:29
16.	"Outro – Give It Up Bud"		1:31

Royal Edition
No.	Title	Writer(s)	Length
1.	"Muévelo"	Cruz Martínez, Jimmy Gómez, Marcos Sifuentes, Tony Butler, Byron Smith, Garfield Baker	3:54
2.	"Oye Mi Amor" (featuring Magic Juan)	Cruz Martínez, Magic Juan, Abel Talamantez	3:43
3.	"Nada Nos Va a Separar"	Claudia Brant, Andrew Thomas	4:02
4.	"Serenata (Estrellita Mía)"	Cruz Martínez, Alicia Villarreal	3:25
5.	"Mírame (No Controles)"	Cruz Martínez, Abel Talamantez, Marcos Sifuentes, Fernando Domínguez	3:25
6.	"Si Pudiera"	Cruz Martínez, Obie Bermúdez	3:19
7.	"Interlude – Yo Seré"		0:22
8.	"Yo Seré" (featuring Slim, Megga, Pryme Status and Big Metra)	Cruz Martínez, Abel Talamantez, Pryme Status, Fernando Domínguez	4:07
9.	"El Rey" (featuring Megga, Menor and Big Metra)	José Alfredo Jiménez	4:07
10.	"Outro – You Gonna Lose"		0:56
11.	"Muchacha Triste" (featuring Dax "El Coyote")	Luis Alva	3:26
12.	"La Neta" (featuring Zion)	Cruz Martínez, Félix Ortiz, Frank Pangelinan	3:31
13.	"Quédate Más (I Want You Back)"	Berry Gordy Jr., Freddie Perren, Deke Richards, Alphonzo Mizell	3:27
14.	"Perfect Girl" (featuring Frankie J and Damon Reel)	Cruz Martínez, Frankie J. Bautista, Brian Stone	3:29
15.	"Outro – Give It Up Bud"		1:31
16.	"Muévelo (Banda Remix)"	Cruz Martínez, Jimmy Gómez, Marcos Sifuentes, Tony Butler, Byron Smith, Garfield Baker	3:15
17.	"Muévelo (Reggaeton Remix)"	Cruz Martínez, Jimmy Gómez, Marcos Sifuentes, Tony Butler, Byron Smith, Garfield Baker	3:48
18.	"Si Pudiera (Pop Version)"	Cruz Martínez, Obie Bermúdez	3:20
19.	"Si Pudiera (Bachata Version)"	Cruz Martínez, Obie Bermúdez	3:27

Royal Edition DVD
No.	Title	Writer(s)	Length
1.	"Muévelo"	Cruz Martínez, Jimmy Gómez, Marcos Sifuentes, Tony Butler, Byron Smith, Garfield Baker	3:54
2.	"Serenata (Estrellita Mía)"	Cruz Martínez, Alicia Villarreal	3:25
3.	"Muchacha Triste"	Luis Alva	3:26
4.	"Yo Seré"	Cruz Martínez, Abel Talamantez, Pryme Status, Fernando Domínguez	4:07

== Personnel ==
Los Super Reyes

- Cruz Martínez – keyboards, backing vocals, composer, producer
- Fernando "Nando" Domínguez III – vocals
- Frankie "Pangie" Pangelinan Jr. – vocals
- Abel Talamántez – vocals
- Joseph "Jo Joe" Alicea López – vocals
- Anthony "Nino B" López – backing vocals, dancer
- Juan Jesús "JP" Peña – backing vocals, dancer
- Ricardo "Megga" Velásquez – vocals
- Kelvin "Menor" Ramos – vocals
- Roy "Slim" Ramírez – percussion
- Alex Ramírez – keyboards
- Reynold Martínez – guitar
- Francisco "Pancho" García – bass guitar
- Robert "Robbie" Del Moral – drums

== Charts ==
Chart (2007)	Peak position
US Billboard 200	130
US Billboard Top Latin Albums	3
US Billboard Regional Mexican Albums	1

== Sales and certifications ==
Region	Certification	Certified units/sales
Mexico (AMPROFON)	Gold	50,000^{^}
United States (RIAA)	Platinum (Latin)	100,000^{^}
^{^} Shipments figures based on certification alone.
