= Un Poco Más (MDO album) =

Studio album by MDO
- Released: February 23, 1999
- Recorded: 1998–99
- Genre: Pop; Rock
- Label: Sony International

MDO chronology
MDO (1997)	Un Poco Más (1999)	Subir Al Cielo (2000)

Singles from Un Poco Más
- 1. "Dame un Poco Más" Released: 1999; 2. "No Puedo Olvidar" Released: 1999; 3. "Baila la Rumba" Released: 1999

Un Poco Más is a studio album by the Puerto Rican boy band MDO, released in 1999 by the record label Sony Music. The band's lineup at the time included Abel Talamántez, Alexis Grullón, Anthony Galindo and Didier Hernández, who not only performed the songs but also contributed to the composition and production of the album.

With 12 tracks, including hits like "Dame un Poco Más," "No Puedo Olvidar," and "Baila la Rumba," the album highlighted the band's musical versatility. The production was handled by Alejandro Jaén, while the artistic direction was supervised by Edgardo Díaz, the creator of the group. In an effort to mature their image, the members designed a more sophisticated aesthetic, reflecting the band's personal and musical evolution.

The release was followed by a promotional tour that took the band through United States, Puerto Rico, and Mexico, including performances in iconic venues such as Madison Square Garden and the Bellas Artes Theatre. The album received favorable reviews from critics, with special praise for its vocal harmonies. Commercially, it achieved notable positions on the Billboard charts and was certified with gold and platinum records. Moreover, the album was nominated for major awards.

== Production and composition ==
The artistic direction of the project was handled by Edgardo Díaz, creator and manager of the group, while the direction and musical production were led by Alejandro Jaén. In addition to singing, the members of the group also acted as composers and participated in the production of the album, as well as contributing to the arrangements. Alexis and Abel wrote five songs in Spanish and one in English, all in collaboration with arranger Tomás Torres.

Alexis stated that several songs they wrote did not make it to the final selection of the album's repertoire. Regarding the experience of composing at such a young age, Abel responded: "When I get inspired to write, I don't just include things that happened to me personally, but I also let my imagination flow and write about other things that someone told me or that could happen to anyone". The singer also revealed that he has no preference between singing and composing.

In an interview, Didier stated: "We want the public to know that we are not just four guys who dance and make the girls scream, we are also musicians". About the composition process, the group said: "There are songs where the melody came first, and others where the lyrics came first. However, most of the time, the songs started as a melody and later became music".

In terms of the visual aspect, the artists designed a distinct image compared to their previous work. According to Alexis: "We wanted a change because we wanted to distance ourselves from that 'little kids' image and make the public see us as more mature. Our fans grew as we grew, and now we can do more aggressive and sensual things". The image presented was much cleaner: they dressed in a youthful way but at the same time appeared formal. The group stated: "For us, the image we present to our audience is crucial; we want to make the best impression, not just with our music".

== Release and promotion ==
Regarding promotion, the group revealed in an interview that their tours and promotional tours were even more important than those of their first album, released in 1997, since they felt more responsible for having direct participation in the production, in collaboration with producer Alejandro Jaén.

For the global release of the album, Alex, Abel, Anthony, and Didier held a live show in February 1999 in Puerto Rico, at the Bellas Artes Theatre, before more than 2,000 fans. A month later, they began their promotional tour across the United States, visiting cities like Los Angeles, Miami, New York (at Madison Square Garden), Chicago, and San José, in California. Later, they returned to Puerto Rico to promote their first single, and traveled to Mexico, where they performed shows in Acapulco and Monterrey.

The group participated in a Christmas concert at Disneyland, where they sang the tracks "Un Poco Mas", "No Puedo Olvidar", and "Me Haces Sonar". The event was attended by more than 1,500 spectators in the audience.

== Singles ==
"No puedo olvidar" was released as the first single. On the Billboard music charts, the song reached first place in the Hot Latin Tracks and Latin Pop Airplay categories, and hit fourth place in Latin Tropical/Salsa Airplay, making its presence felt across different Latin music segments.

"Dame un poco más" was released in both Spanish and English, under the title "Groove With Me Tonight". The Spanish version reached number 11 and 6 on the Billboard charts, in Hot Latin Songs and Latin Pop Airplay, respectively. Regarding the music video, Galindo stated: "In the new video we recorded (for 'Dame Un Poco Más'), we're kissing girls (...) It's a more mature video. It's like things we want to do. Not things we couldn't do because of our age and our image". The recording took place in New York.

"Baila la rumba" was released as a promotional single in Mexico, in 1999.

== Critical reception ==
Professional ratings
Review scores
Source	Rating
Allmusic	2.5/5 stars
Billboard	Favorable
El Norte	3/5 stars

The critic of AllMusic stated that MDO preserves Menudo's legacy while presenting a more modern and sophisticated approach. He praised the quartet's vocal harmonies as well as their performance, which avoids excessive emotional displays. Among the highlights, he selected the English track "Groove With Me Tonight," "Baila La Rumba," and "Un Mundo Nuevo." However, it was in "Toma mis Manos" that the critic saw the peak of MDO's style, capturing the essence of the sweet and confident sensuality that defines Latin pop sensibility.

Billboard stated that the album reinforces MDO's position as a Latin version of the Backstreet Boys and 'N Sync, highlighting tracks such as "No Puedo Olvidar" and "Dame Un Poco Más" for their potential success on Latin and Anglo radio stations. He also pointed out "Fantasy" as a promising bet to conquer the international market, thanks to its vibrant and accessible style.

Deborah Davis of Mexican newspaper El Norte, stated that the album was superior to the previous one, and that the least remarkable songs were the sweetest, such as the track "Yo solo pienso en ti". For the journalist, MDO's best feature is that its members can sing and dance well, without being just pretty faces, and that the album came at an opportune moment, when the Latin market demands music sung in Spanish for young people.

== Awards and nominations ==
At the Billboard Latin Music Awards, the album was nominated in the Album of the Year (Group) category, alongside Amor, Familia Y Respeto by A.B. Quintanilla and Los Kumbia Kings, Mi Gloria, Eres Tú by Los Tri-O, and the winner MTV Unplugged by the Mexican band Maná.

The promotional video for "No Puedo Olvidar" was nominated for Video of the Year at the Premio Lo Nuestro 1999. The winner of the category was "Esperanza" by singer Enrique Iglesias.

== Commercial performance ==
In the United States, it reached positions number 39 and 15 on the Billboard Top Latin Albums and Latin Pop Albums charts, respectively. Sales reached 111,000 copies between the United States and Puerto Rico in just a few weeks of release. The group's record label awarded them a gold record for the impressive sales coming from Central America.

== Track listing ==
No.	Title	Writer(s)	Performer	Length
1.	"Dame Un Poco Más"	Abel Talamántez, Alexis Grullón, Tommy Torres	Abel Talamántez	3:57
2.	"No Puedo Olvidar -Ballad Version-"	Abel Talamántez, Alexis Grullón, Tommy Torres	Didier Hernández	3:42
3.	"Baila La Rumba"	Carlos Villa, Alejandro Monroy	Anthony Galindo	4:02
4.	"Yo Sólo Pienso En Ti"	Alejandro Jaén	Alexis Grullón	4:14
5.	"Diana"	Abel Talamántez, Alexis Grullón, Tommy Torres, M. Grillasca	Abel Talamántez	4:03
6.	"Tú Me Haces Soñar"	Abel Talamántez, Alexis Grullón, Tommy Torres	Didier Hernández	3:37
7.	"Un Mundo Nuevo"	M. Grillasca, Tommy Torres	Alexis Grullón	3:43
8.	"Será Por Eso"	Rafael Vergara	All the group	3:55
9.	"Toma Mis Manos"	Didier Hernández, Abel Talamántez, Alexis Grullón, Tommy Torres	Anthony Galindo	4:06
10.	"No Puedo Olvidar -Pop Version-"	Abel Talamántez, Alexis Grullón, Tommy Torres	Didier Hernández	4:27
11.	"Groove With Me Tonight"	Abel Talamántez, Alexis Grullón, Tommy Torres	Abel Talamántez	3:54
12.	"Fantasy"	J. Santiago, Alejandro Jaén, Lewis Martinée, Denis Nieves	Alexis Grullón	4:29

== Charts ==
Music chart (1999)	Best position
United States (Billboard Top Latin Albums)	39
United States (Billboard Latin Pop Albums)	15

== Certifications and sales ==
Region	Certification	Sales
United States	Platinum	111,000
Central America	Gold	—
