= Todavía (song) =

Single by Cruz Martínez y Los Super Reyes

from the album Cumbia con Soul
- Released: October 16, 2009 (Radio); November 17, 2009 (EP)
- Recorded: 2009
- Genre: Cumbia
- Length: 3:50
- Label: Warner Music Latina
- Songwriter(s): Cruz Martínez, Juan Paulo Hernández
- Producer(s): Cruz Martínez

Cruz Martínez y Los Super Reyes singles chronology
"Eres" (2009)	"Todavía" (2009)

"Todavía" is a song by Cruz Martínez y Los Super Reyes. It is the second single from the album Cumbia con Soul (2009). It was released on October 16, 2009. An EP was released on the Mexican iTunes Store on November 11, 2009.

== Track listing ==
- Mexican iTunes EP
1. "Todavía" – 3:48
2. "Todavía (Radio Version)" – 3:48
3. "Todavía (Super Banda Version)" – 4:21
4. "Todavía (Acappelas Bcks DJ Remixer Version 2)" – 3:54
5. "Todavía (Acappelas Lds DJ Remixer Version 1)" – 3:54

== Personnel ==
- Written by Cruz Martínez and Juan Paulo Hernández
- Produced by Cruz Martínez
- Lead vocals by Pangie and Abel Talamántez
