= Pablo Portillo =

Mexican singer and actor (born 1984)

- Born: Pablo Alberto Portillo Heredia; April 8, 1979 (age 46); Mexico City, Mexico
- Occupations: Singer, Actor
- Website: http://www.pabloportillo.com

Pablo Alberto Portillo Heredia (born April 8, 1979 in Mexico City, Mexico) is a Mexican singer and actor.

Portillo was a member of Mexican group Liberacion and later a member of MDO., which was a new version of boy band Menudo. With MDO, Portillo toured across Latin America, the United States, and Mexico. Portillo was in MDO with Didier Hernández, Abel Talamantez and Alexis Grullon. During Portillo's time in MDO, the group achieved their most successful phase of the MDO era.

Portillo released Demasiado, his first CD, in 2006. which earned him several nominations and awards in Puerto Rico, the United States and Latin America.

In 2007, he recorded his second album and worked in Telemundo's Pecados Ajenos as Hector, one of the young cast members.

In 2011, he worked with Azteca in Emperatriz.

In 2014, he worked with Azteca in Así en el Barrio como en el Cielo.
