= Cumbia con Soul =

Studio album by Cruz Martínez y Los Super Reyes
- Released: June 30, 2009
- Recorded: 2008–2009
- Genre: Cumbia
- Length: 51:18
- Label: Warner Music Latina
- Producer: Cruz Martínez

Cruz Martínez y Los Super Reyes chronology
El Regreso de los Reyes (2007)	Cumbia con Soul (2009)

Singles from Cumbia con Soul
- 1. "Eres" Released: May 4, 2009; 2. "Todavía" Released: October 16, 2009

Professional ratings
Review scores
Source	Rating
AllMusic	3/5 stars

Cumbia con Soul (English: Cumbia with Soul) is the second studio album by Mexican-American cumbia group Cruz Martínez y Los Super Reyes. It was released on June 30, 2009 by Warner Music Latina.

== Track listing ==
No.	Title	Writer(s)	Length
1.	"Tu Magia"	Cruz Martínez, Juan Paulo Hernández, Freddie "Fredrecks" Martínez	3:32
2.	"Algo de Ella"	Cruz Martínez, Juan Paulo Hernández, Ricardo Velásquez, Kelvin Ramos, Frank Pangelinan	3:49
3.	"Un Motivo para Soñar"	Nahuel Schajris, Claudia Brant, Luis Fonsi	3:43
4.	"Sin Tu Amor"	Cruz Martínez, Juan Paulo Hernández	3:33
5.	"Eres"	Cruz Martínez, Juan Paulo Hernández	3:14
6.	"Todavía"	Cruz Martínez, Juan Paulo Hernández	3:50
7.	"Amiga Te Quiero"	Cruz Martínez, Juan Paulo Hernández	3:43
8.	"Preso"	Rafael Pérez Botija	4:13
9.	"Baby"	Cruz Martínez, Michael Figueroa	3:33
10.	"Ella Se Va"	Cruz Martínez, Juan Paulo Hernández, Ricardo Velásquez, Abel Talamántez	3:46
11.	"Baila Sin Parar"	Cruz Martínez, Juan Paulo Hernández, Ricardo Velásquez, Kelvin Ramos, Abel Talamántez	3:31
12.	"Superficial"	Cruz Martínez, Reynold Martínez, Abel Talamántez	3:42
13.	"Go Ahead Girl"	Cruz Martínez, Anthony López, Jovani Castillo, Víctor Luévanos	3:07
14.	"Something About Her (Algo de Ella)"	Cruz Martínez, Juan Paulo Hernández, Peter "P3" Rodríguez, Willie Wheat	3:39

== Personnel ==
Los Super Reyes

- Cruz Martínez – keyboards, backing vocals, composer, producer
- Frank "Pangie" Pangelinan, Jr. – vocals
- Abel Talamántez – vocals
- Joseph "Jo Joe" Alicea López – vocals
- Anthony "Nino B" López – backing vocals, dancer
- Juan Jesús "JP" Peña – backing vocals, dancer
- Ricardo "Megga" Velásquez – vocals
- Kelvin "Menor" Ramos – vocals
- Juan Paulo Hernández – keyboards, producer
- Reynold Martínez – guitar

== Charts ==
Chart (2009)	Peak position
US Billboard Top Latin Albums	16
US Billboard Regional Mexican Albums	8
