= Muchacha Triste =

Single by Los Fantasmas del Caribe

from the album Caramelo
- Released: 1992
- Genre: Latin music
- Length: 4:07
- Label: Rodven Records, TH-Rodven
- Songwriter(s): Luis Alva
- Producer(s): Luis Alva

Los Fantasmas del Caribe singles chronology
"Muchacha Triste" (1992)	"Ella Es" (1993)

"Muchacha Triste" ("Sad Girl") is a song written and produced by Luis Alva for the Venezuelan group Los Fantasmas del Caribe for their debut album Caramelo (1991). The song reached number one on the Billboard Hot Latin Songs in the United States in 1993 and ended as the fifth best-performing song of the year in the country. The song was nominated Pop Song of the Year at the 1994 Lo Nuestro Awards.

== DJ Kane version ==
"Muchacha Triste"

Single by DJ Kane

from the album Capítulo III: Ahogando Penas
- Released: March 6, 2007
- Recorded: 2007
- Genre: Cumbia
- Length: 3:39
- Label: EMI Latin
- Songwriter(s): Luis Alva

DJ Kane singles chronology
"Miéntele" (2007)	"Muchacha Triste" (2007)	"Cierra Tu Bocca" (2009)

"Muchacha Triste" was covered by DJ Kane. It is the second single from the album Capítulo III: Ahogando Penas (2007).

== Los Super Reyes version ==
"Muchacha Triste"

Single by Cruz Martínez y Los Super Reyes

from the album El Regreso de los Reyes
- Released: 2008
- Recorded: 2007
- Genre: Cumbia
- Length: 3:26
- Label: Warner Music Latina
- Songwriter(s): Luis Alva
- Producer(s): Cruz Martínez

Cruz Martínez y Los Super Reyes singles chronology
"Serenata (Estrellita Mía)" (2007)	"Muchacha Triste" (2008)	"Yo Seré" (2008)

"Muchacha Triste" was covered by Cruz Martínez y Los Super Reyes. It is the third single from the album El Regreso de los Reyes (2007).
