= Quiero (Jerry Rivera song) =

2001 song by Jerry Rivera

Single by Jerry Rivera

from the album Rivera
- Released: January 2001
- Genre: Pop (Note: ballad version) • salsa
- Length: 4:35 (ballad version); 4:52 (salsa version)
- Label: BMG US Latin
- Songwriters: Martha Cancel; Ray Contreras; James Nicholas Greco
- Producers: Bebu Silvetti (ballad version); Ramón Sánchez (salsa version)

Jerry Rivera singles chronology
"No Me Olvidarás" (2001)	"Quiero" (2001)	"Muero" (2001)

"Quiero" (transl. "I Want") is a song by Puerto Rican singer Jerry Rivera from his 11th studio album Rivera, (2001). The song was co-written by Martha Cancel, Ray Contreras, and James Nicholas Greco and produced by Bebu Silvetti. It is a pop ballad in which the singer pays homage to women. A salsa version of the track was also recorded which was arranged and produced by Ramón Sánchez. It was released in January 2001 by BMG US Latin as the lead single from the album in January 2001. A music video for "Quiero" was directed by Juan Basanta and features Rivera in various background flirting with a woman.

The song received positive reactions from music critics who felt it was one of the best tracks in the album. It was nominated in the category of Tropical Song of the Year at the 2002 Lo Nuestro Awards and was recognized as one of the best-performing songs from American Society of Composers, Authors and Publishers (ASCAP) Latin Award and Broadcast Music, Inc. (BMI) Latin Award in 2002. Commercially, it topped the Billboard Hot Latin Songs, Latin Pop Airplay, and Tropical Airplay charts in the United States.

== Background and composition ==
Since the 1990s, Jerry Rivera has been one of the most successful salsa artists with songs such as "Cara de Niño" and "Amores Como el Nuestro" becoming hits in the genre. In 2000, Rivera released his 10th studio album, Para Siempre, another salsa record launched by Sony Discos. In April 2000, Rivera announced that his next album would consist of pop ballads that would be produced by Argentine musician Bebu Silvetti and released the follow year with his new record label BMG US Latin. According to Rivera, he had just planned to record a few ballads, but didn't expect a full-length ballad album. Recording for the album, titled Rivera, took place in Miami, Florida.

The opening track "Quiero" was composed by Martha Cancel, Ray Contreras, and James Nicholas Greco. The track is a romantic pop ballad which Rivera describes it as a "tribute to one of God's most beautiful creations, women". He further explained the theme of the song which is "dedicated to the greatest thing, which is women, to how important she is, to what one can become with her and cannot achieve without her". A salsa version of the track was also recorded for the album which was arranged and produced by Ramón Sánchez.

== Promotion and reception ==
"Quiero" was released as the lead single from Rivera in January 2001. A music video was filmed for the ballad version and was directed by Juan Basanta; it features the artist in various places including a flower field, a waterfall, and a party in a house where he flirts with a woman. The song also served as the main theme for the Mexican telenovela El noveno mandamiento (2001). Leila Cobo of Billboard magazine called it and "Muero" the album's "standouts" and complimented the artist for "letting loose with persuasive pathos". The Houston Chronicle critic Ramiro Burr stated Rivera "pours a variety of emotional shadings into torchy numbers" including "Quiero, "Muero", and "Que Queda de Nuestra Amor". Burr also felt the singer's decision to record the salsa version was also "wisely included". An editor for Latin Style magazine called the salsa version the best track in the album. Writing for Hanford Sentinel, Ricardo Cores commented that on "Quiero", "you can see an evolving singer who interprets the ballad genre with feeling and depth".

The track was nominated in the category of Tropical Song of the Year at the 14th Annual Lo Nuestro Awards in 2002, but ultimately lost to "Cómo Olvidar" by Olga Tañón. It was recognized as one of the best-performing songs of the year at the 2002 ASCAP Latin Awards on the tropical category as well as in the BMI Latin Awards in the same year. Commercially, "Quiero" topped the Billboard Hot Latin Songs chart as well as its subcharts, the Latin Pop Airplay and Tropical Airplay chart in the US.

== Charts ==
=== Weekly charts ===
Chart performance for "Quiero"
Chart (2001)	Peak position
US Hot Latin Songs (Billboard)	1
US Latin Pop Airplay (Billboard)	1
US Tropical Airplay (Billboard)	1

=== Year-end charts ===
2001 year-end chart performance for "Quiero"
Chart (2001)	Position
US Hot Latin Songs (Billboard)	18
US Latin Pop Airplay (Billboard)	19
US Tropical Airplay (Billboard)	5

== See also ==
- List of number-one Billboard Hot Latin Tracks of 2001
- List of Billboard Latin Pop Airplay number ones of 2001
- List of Billboard Tropical Airplay number ones of 2001
