= 15 Años (album) =

Studio album by Menudo
- Released: 1992
- Genre: Latin Pop

Menudo chronology
Detras de tu Mirada (1991)	15 Años (1992)	Vem Pra Mim (1993)

15 Años (15 Years) is a studio album by the Puerto Rican boy band Menudo, released in 1992. At the time, the group consisted of Adrián Olivares and new members: Abel Talamántez, Alexis Grullón, Andy Blázquez, and Ashley Ruiz. This would be the last album featuring Adrián, who was replaced by Ricky López in 1993.

== Background ==
After the success of their previous album, Detras de tu Mirada, in countries like Peru, Menudo released two English singles titled "Dancin', Movin', Shakin'" and Cosmopolitan Girl, under the McGillis Records label. For this new project, the group re-recorded some songs from Menudo's discography, originally performed by members from other line-ups, and also included new tracks. Although the album is titled Quince Años (15 Years), the group was already 17 years into their career.

About the new album, Alexis, one of the members, commented: "Our new album is celebratory. It not only contains well-known songs from the group but also brings new material." Ashley added: "People who listen to Quince Años will realize that Menudo is much more than a group of five teenagers who sing and dance and sell millions of albums worldwide (...) Menudo is good music, clean and appropriate for young people. It’s a group that only promotes positive things and is against injustice, drugs, and violence."

== Promotion and commercial performance ==
To promote the new album, three singles were released: "Buscame", "Y Tú Que Ni Te Fijas", and "Lo Que Juramos". Commercially, "Buscame" was the most successful, reaching the number-one spot on radio charts in Peru. As part of the promotion, Menudo embarked on a tour that included performances in the United States and Europe.

== Tracklist ==
No.	Title	Writer(s)	Singer	Length
1.	"Ángel Negro"	Carlos Santana	Adrián Olivares	4:32
2.	"Sólo Intenta"	Jessica Sarango	Alexis Grullón	3:33
3.	"Así"	Alissa Aguirre	Abel Talamántez	4:16
4.	"Y Tú Que Ni Te Fijas"	Carlos Lara	Andy Blázquez	3:42
5.	"Y Decirle Que Sí"	Fernando Osorio	Ashley Ruiz	3:22
6.	"A Dónde Irá"	Carlos Lara	Adrián Olivares	3:58
7.	"Búscame"	Ricardo Miguel Vendrel, Alejandro Soler	Alexis Grullón	5:40
8.	"Tú Eres Todo Para Mí"	Juan Carlos Pérez Soto	Ashley Ruiz	3:50
9.	"Voy De Regreso Contigo"	Juan Carlos Pérez Soto	Andy Blázquez	3:13
10.	"Quince Años"	Juan Carlos Pérez Soto	Alexis Grullón	4:35
11.	"Bajo La Luna"	Carlos Lara, Tino Geiser	Abel Talamántez	3:16
12.	"Lo Que Juramos"	Fernando Osorio	Ashley Ruiz, Adrián Olivares, Alexis Grullón	3:03
