= Sube a mi Motora =

Song performed by Menudo

"Sube a mi Motora" (commonly referred as "Súbete a mi Moto") is a song by Menudo from their 1981 album Quiero Ser. It became arguably the album's most popular song, topping the charts in Puerto Rico, Mexico, and Venezuela. It is considered by many Menudo fans to have been the group's best song ever and their signature song. Rene Farrait was the lead singer for this song.

"Súbete a mi Moto" (Get on my motorcycle in English) created some controversy in Puerto Rico, because in Puerto Rico "moto", at the moment the song came out, was the term used for illegal drugs (marihuana cigarette). Because of that, the song's name was different in Mexico than the original name using the term "motora". The Mexican version also became known across Latin America and was used in Menudo's 1982 film, Una Aventura Llamada Menudo, where Farrait's substitute, Charlie Masso, sang it. Later, Roy Rossello also sang the theme as lead singer. 13 years after the song was out, member Ashley Ruiz eventually sang it as part of the "Menudo Medley", then it was covered in the MDO album in 1997, when it was sung by Anthony Galindo.

"Sube a mi Motora (Súbete a mi moto)" was usually the last song performed at Menudo concerts during the era that the song was a hit. When six members of Menudo returned to the stage in 1998 during their El Reencuentro comeback tour, Sube a mi Motora was always the last song performed by the former Menudo's and Farrait ended the shows by driving a motorcycle around.

An English version was released as "Motorcycle Dreamer" in Reaching Out, with Miguel Cancel first covering the song, then Ricky Melendez (after Cancel left the band) as lead singer. That same year, the song was released in their first Portuguese Album Mania called "Sobe em Minha Moto" and it became a hit in Brazil, with Melendez singing it.

According to some online websites, the song is about experiencing freedom.

== Partial lyrics ==
- ¡Súbete a mi moto! ¡Nunca has conocido, un amor tan veloz! ¡Súbete a mi moto! ¡Ella guardará, el secreto de dos, de los dos! (loosely translated to: Get on my motorcycle! You have never known, such a fast romance! Get on my motorcycle! It (the motorcycle) will keep, the secret of two, of you and me!)

== Video ==
At the time the song was released in 1981, musical videos were a relatively new way to promote songs, and this was the first song for which the band recorded a video for, The video features Rene Farrait as the lead singer and the boys driving their bikes around as they sing. Band members have expressed that they really enjoyed riding on motorcycles at the time and each owned a motorcycle in real life.

== See also ==
- A Volar
