= Tiempo de Amar =

Studio album by Menudo
- Released: February 13, 1996
- Genre: Latin Pop
- Label: Sony Music

Menudo chronology
Imagínate... (1994)	Tiempo de Amar (1996)	El Reencuentro: 15 Años Después (1998)

Tiempo de Amar (Time to Love) is Menudo's 36th album (23rd in Spanish), released in 1996. The album features the members: Abel Talamántez, Alexis Grullón, Andy Blázquez, and new members Didier Hernández from Cuba, and Anthony Galindo from Venezuela. Didier and Anthony replaced Ashley Ruiz and Ricky López, who decided to leave the group.

This was the last album recorded under the name Menudo. The creator, Edgardo Díaz, had sold the name to a Panamanian company, so the group’s name was changed to MDO.

== Critical reception ==
Regarding the reviews from music critics, the reception was favorable, with some critics pointing out that the repertoire represented a maturation of the quintet's previous works.

The critic from Billboard magazine stated that the melodies were catchy and highlighted the romantic lyrics and vocal harmonies. He pointed out that "Más Y Más," with an upbeat pop/dance rhythm, "Buscando Un Amor," with reggae influences, and the ballad "Tiempo De Amar" would particularly appeal to pre-adolescent female audiences.

== Commercial performance ==
The album generated two radio hits for the group: the song "No Entiendo" reached number 9 on the Billboard Latin Pop Airplay chart, where it remained for nine consecutive weeks. The single "Dónde Está Tu Amor" achieved the same feat, reaching number 9, and stayed on the chart for eight weeks.

The album was commercially successful in Colombia after a long hiatus for the group in the country.

== Tracklist ==
No.	Title	Writer(s)	Singer(s)	Length
1.	"Dónde Está Tu Amor"	Alejandro Jaén	Alexis Grullón	4:42
2.	"Te Amaré"	Alejandro Jaén	Alexis Grullón	3:33
3.	"Tiempo De Amar"	Remi Palacios, Joe B. Jacob	Didier Hernández	4:24
4.	"No Entiendo"	Gustavo Márquez	Didier Hernández	3:09
5.	"He Venido A Pedirte Perdón"	Juan Gabriel	Alexis Grullón	4:38
6.	"Buscando Un Amor"	Alejandro Jaén, William Paz	Abel Talamántez	3:24
7.	"Bésame"	Alejandro Jaén, William Paz	Andy Blázquez	3:37
8.	"Solos Tú Y Yo"	Alejandro Jaén, William Paz	Andy Blázquez	3:32
9.	"Más Y Más"	Fernando Osorio	Anthony Galindo	3:21
10.	"Hablar De Amor (Crossover Love)"	Fernando Osorio	Didier Hernández	4:12
11.	"Una Limosna"	Samuel Sosa, Chico Amaral; Spanish version: Alejandro Jaén	Anthony Galindo	3:28
12.	"Soy Todo Un Enredo"	Samuel Sosa, Chico Amaral; Spanish version: Andrés Blázquez	Abel Talamántez	3:03
