= DJ Kane (album) =

DJ Kane Capítulo I: Mía

Studio album by DJ Kane
- Released: March 23, 2004
- Recorded: 2003–2004
- Genre: Cumbia
- Length: 50:56
- Label: EMI Latin

DJ Kane chronology
DJ Kane; Capítulo I: Mía (2004)	Capítulo II: Brinca (2005)

Singles from DJ Kane
- 1. "La Negra Tomasa" Released: February 10, 2004; 2. "Mía" Released: May 29, 2004

DJ Kane, also known as Capítulo I: Mía (English: Chapter I: Mine), is the debut studio album by Mexican-American recording artist DJ Kane. It was released on March 23, 2004, by EMI Latin. DJ Kane was nominated for a Lo Nuestro Award for Urban Album of the Year.

== Track listing ==
No.	Title	Writer(s)	Length
1.	"Intro"		0:41
2.	"La Negra Tomasa"	Guillermo Rodríguez Fiffe	3:39
3.	"Mía"	Claudia Brant, Gen Rubin, Howie Dorough, Rogelio Zavala Jr	3:41
4.	"Puras Mentiras"	Jason Cano, Claudia Brant, Gen Rubin	4:00
5.	"Que Buena Vida"	Jason Cano, Claudia Brant, Jeeve	4:07
6.	"Kane's Harem (Te Voy a Hacer Bailar)"	Jason Cano, Claudia Brant, Jeeve, Travis House	3:56
7.	"No Me Dejes Sin Tu Amor"	Jason Cano, Claudia Brant, Gen Rubin	4:45
8.	"Pisa Fuerte"	Claudia Brant, Gen Rubin	3:29
9.	"Mirame"	Claudia Brant, Luis Fonsi	4:57
10.	"Mía (Cumbia Version)"	Claudia Brant, Gen Rubin, Howie Dorough, Rogelio Zavala Jr	3:33
11.	"Que'lo Que Tiene"	Jason Cano, Claudia Brant	4:02
12.	"You Still Belong to Me"	Claudia Brant, Gen Rubin, Howie Dorough	3:43
13.	"La Negra Tomasa (Club Agenda Mix)"	Guillermo Rodríguez Fiffe	6:23
