= Anthony Galindo =

Venezuelan musical artist (1978–2020)

El PapiJoe
- Also known as: Anthony Galindo; El PapiJoe
- Born: Edgar Antonio Galindo Ibarra; 14 December 1978; Caracas, Venezuela
- Died: 3 October 2020 (aged 41) Miami, Florida, U.S.
- Genres: Latin pop
- Occupations: Singer; model
- Instrument: Vocals
- Years active: 1995–2002; 2011–2020
- Formerly of: Menudo; MDO
- Spouse: Dayana Maya

Edgar Antonio Galindo Ibarra (14 December 1978 – 3 October 2020), also known as Anthony Galindo and popularly known as El PapiJoe, was a Venezuelan singer, model, and entertainer.

== Career ==
Since 1995, Galindo was part of the then-last stage of Latino boy band Menudo along with his bandmates Abel Talamántez, Alexis Grullón, Andy Blazquez, and Didier Hernández. Menudo was a musical phenomenon of the 1980s created in 1977 by producer Edgardo Díaz and from which stars such as Ricky Martin, Johnny Lozada, and Robi Draco Rosa emerged. According to the newspaper El Universal, Galindo was the second Venezuelan to join the ranks of Menudo.

Later, in 1997 he joined the ballad-pop group MDO, which emerged after the dissolution of Menudo, there they released albums such as Un poco más (1999) and Subir al cielo (2000). They won 2 gold and one platinum records, and popularized songs in both English and Spanish. He was also part of the groups Kumbia Kings and Proyecto Uno.

In 2011, he released the song "Pro Pro Pro" under the Rhythm Rehab Records label.

In addition, he stood out for his work as a model on the famous catwalks of San Juan Fashion Week and also received an award in Puerto Rico as "the sexiest man" on television. In the United States, he participated as host of the television program Control. He came to collaborate with musical groups such as Los Super Reyes, with whom he performed some songs and also wrote songs.

== Personal life ==
He was born to a Colombian father, a Venezuelan mother, and a Cuban stepmother. He grew up with his sister Natalie and two brothers Alejandro and Cesar.

He was engaged to Dayana Maya and had a daughter named Elizabeth Michelle Galindo Matos from his ex-wife Michelle Matos.

== Death ==
Galindo died on October 3, 2020, at age 41 after being hospitalized for injuries suffered in a suicide attempt by hanging the previous week. His ex wife stated in a tell all book about her life called Cicatrices. His family described the singer's deep depression from the prolonged shutdown of various entertainment performance venues caused by the COVID-19 pandemic. His organs were donated in accordance with his last wish.

Galindo became the first member of Menudo to have died.

== Discography ==
=== Albums ===
==== With Menudo ====
- Tiempo de Amar (1996)

==== With MDO ====
- MDO (1997)
- Un Poco Más (1999)
- Subir Al Cielo (2000)

=== Singles ===
- "Pro pro pro"
- "Policía" featuring Daniel René
