= Capítulo III: Ahogando Penas =

Studio album by DJ Kane
- Released: March 20, 2007
- Recorded: 2006–2007
- Genre: Cumbia
- Length: 41:22
- Label: EMI Latin

DJ Kane chronology
Capítulo II: Brinca (2005)	Capítulo III: Ahogando Penas (2007)

Singles from Capítulo III: Ahogando Penas
- 1. "Miéntele" Released: March 6, 2007; 2. "Muchacha Triste" Released: March 6, 2007

Capítulo III: Ahogando Penas (English: Chapter III: Drowning Sorrows) is the third studio album by Mexican-American recording artist DJ Kane. It was released on March 20, 2007, by EMI Latin.

== Track listing ==
No.	Title	Writer(s)	Length
1.	"Miéntele"	Luigi Giraldo, Joel Bosh	3:49
2.	"Ahogando Penas"	Juan Fernando Fonseca, D 'Odarg I.	3:49
3.	"Terapia Alternativa"	José Luis Pagan	3:23
4.	"El Castigo"	Jason Cano, Mariano Herrera, DJ Dus, Luigi Giraldo	3:44
5.	"Muchacha Triste"	Luis Alva	3:39
6.	"Segundos y Minutos"	Luigi Giraldo	3:56
7.	"Ni una Gota de Amor"	Juan Carlos Pérez Soto, Elsten Torres	3:31
8.	"Mejor Te Vas"	D 'Odarg I.	3:33
9.	"Por Eso Te Quiero"	Luigi Giraldo	4:05
10.	"El Sombrero"	Marcelo Azevedo, D 'Odarg I.	4:05
11.	"Ahogando Penas (Duet Version)" (featuring Fonseca)	Juan Fernando Fonseca, D 'Odarg I.	3:48
