= Rivera (album) =

Studio album by Jerry Rivera
- Released: March 6, 2001
- Genre: Pop
- Length: 56:46
- Label: BMG US Latin
- Producer: Bebu Silvetti

Jerry Rivera chronology
No Me Olvidarás (2001)	Rivera (2001)	Vuela Muy Alto (2002)

Singles from Rivera
- 1. "Quiero" Released: January 2001; 2. "Muero" Released: 2001

Professional ratings
Review scores
Source	Rating
Allmusic	4/5 stars

Rivera is the 11th studio album recorded by Puerto Rican singer Jerry Rivera released on March 6, 2001. It marks his first foray into pop sentimental ballads as well as his first under BMG US Latin. Despite it being a pop album, it reached #1 on the Billboard Tropical Albums chart.

== Track listing ==
This information adapted from Allmusic.

No.	Title	Writer(s)	Length
1.	"Quiero"	Martha Cancel; Ray Contreras; James Nicholas Greco	4:35
2.	"Tú"	Slvia Riera Ibanez; Bebu Silvetti	4:13
3.	"Fingir"	Donato Poveda	3:45
4.	"Caramelito"	Bellena	4:36
5.	"Y Se Escapó el Amor"	Virginia Faiad; Daniel Freiberg; Luis Sarmiento	4:24
6.	"Muero"	Armando Larrinaga	4:08
7.	"Vuelve"	Adrián Possé; Rudy Pérez	3:54
8.	"Que Queda de Nuestro Amor"	Ibanez	4:45
9.	"Volverás"	Pachy Lopez	4:44
10.	"Un Beso de Quien Amas"	Lopez	4:09
11.	"Una Señal"	Paolo Bethencourt	4:09
12.	"Porque Tú"	Fernando Osorio	4:44
13.	"Quiero" (salsa version)	Cancel; Contreras; Greco	4:52

== Chart performance ==
Chart (2001)	Peak position
U.S. Billboard Top Latin Albums	6
U.S. Billboard Latin Pop Albums	4
U.S. Billboard Tropical Albums	1
U.S. Billboard Heatseekers Albums	22

== Certification ==
Region	Certification	Certified units/sales
United States (RIAA)	Platinum (Latin)	100,000^{^}
^{^} Shipments figures based on certification alone.
