= Te Quise Olvidar =

"Te Quisé Olvidar"

Single by MDO

from the album Subir Al Cielo
- Released: 18 October 2000
- Studio: Cocoa-Butt Recording Studio, Culver City, California; Diginote Studios, Miami, Florida; EQ's Recording Studios
- Genre: Latin pop
- Length: 4:23
- Label: Sony Discos
- Songwriters: Carlos Baute; Yasmil Marrufo
- Producer: Alejandro Jaen

MDO singles chronology
"Dame un Poco Más" (1999)	"Te Quisé Olvidar" (2000)	"Sin Ti" (2001)

"Te Quise Olvidar" ("I Wanted to Forget You") is a song originally performed and co-written by Venezuelan singer Carlos Baute from his album Yo Nací Para Quererte (1999). It is a ballad about "obsession towards a lost love and the useless attempt to forget by finding someone new". The song was later covered by Latin pop boy band MDO from their album Subir Al Cielo (2000). It was released as the album's lead single on 18 October 2000. The music video was directed by co-directed by Pablo Croce and Tony Van Den-ende and filmed at a desert in Venezuela. It served as the main theme for the telenovelas Muñeca brava and Alma rebelde. A norteño and English version was also recorded with the latter being titled "So Hard to Forget". A salsa version was also later recorded and included on the compilation album 2002 Ultimate Mega Hits (2002). Other cover versions include salsa versions by Japhet Albert and Moa Rivera, numbers 31 and 21, respectively, on the Billboard Tropical Airplay charts, and regional Mexican versions by El Bebeto and Siggno (numbers 14 and 43 in Mexico).

== Charts ==
=== Weekly charts ===
Weekly chart positions for "Te Quise Olvidar"
Chart (2001)	Peak position
US Hot Latin Songs (Billboard)	1
US Latin Pop Airplay (Billboard)	1
US Tropical Airplay (Billboard)	1

=== Year-end charts ===
2001 year-end chart performance for "Te Quise Olvidar"
Chart (2000)	Position
US Hot Latin Songs (Billboard)	3
US Latin Pop Airplay (Billboard)	5
US Tropical Airplay (Billboard)	15

== See also ==
- List of number-one Billboard Hot Latin Tracks of 2001
- List of Billboard Latin Pop Airplay number ones of 2001
- List of Billboard Tropical Airplay number ones of 2001
