= Capítulo II: Brinca =

Studio album by DJ Kane
- Released: September 13, 2005
- Recorded: 2004–2005
- Genre: Cumbia
- Length: 53:35
- Label: EMI Latin

DJ Kane chronology
DJ Kane (2004)	Capítulo II: Brinca (2005)	Capítulo III: Ahogando Penas (2007)

Singles from Capítulo II: Brinca
- 1. "Por Qué Esperaste" Released: June 19, 2005; 2. "Brinca" Released: October 14, 2005; 3. "Es Tan Bello" Released: February 28, 2006; 4. "Mueve la Cintura" Released: May 1, 2006

Capítulo II: Brinca (English: Chapter II: Jump) is the second studio album by Mexican-American recording artist DJ Kane. It was released on September 13, 2005 by EMI Latin.

== Track listing ==
No.	Title	Writer(s)	Length
1.	"Brinca"	Jason Cano, Jorge Saulcedo, E. Schrody, L. Muggerud	3:01
2.	"Es Tan Bello"	Miguel Mendoza	4:02
3.	"Mueve la Cintura" (featuring Celso Piña)	Jason Cano, Alfonso Herrera	3:04
4.	"Ultimo Adiós"	Jason Cano, Mariano Herrera	4:17
5.	"Arriba" (featuring Aracely Arámbula)	Jason Cano, Descemor Bueno	3:17
6.	"No Puedo"	Jason Cano, Mariano Herrera, Carlos Rodríguez	3:31
7.	"La Colegiala"		4:02
8.	"Por Qué Esperaste"	Jason Cano, Edgar Ramírez	3:06
9.	"Vente Conmigo" (featuring Ice)	Jason Cano, Mariano Herrera, Jorge Salcedo	3:17
10.	"Ayer"	Jason Cano, Alex Espinoza	4:24
11.	"Salud (El Borracho)"	Jason Cano, Raúl Navaira, Mariano Herrera	3:04
12.	"Sin Ti"	Jason Cano, Mariano Herrera	4:05
13.	"How We Do" (featuring Mr. Mar$)	Jason Cano, B. Jackson	3:31
14.	"Brinca (Versión Reggaetón)"	Jason Cano, Jorge Saulcedo, E. Schrody, L. Muggerud	3:12
15.	"Por Qué Esperaste (Versión Bilingüe)"	Jason Cano, Edgar Ramírez	3:14
