= Subir Al Cielo =

2000 studio album by MDO

Studio album by MDO
- Released: October 31, 2000
- Recorded: June – July 2000
- Studios: Cocoa-Butt Recording Studio (Culver City, CA); Digtone Studios; EQ's Recording Studios; Extremem Music Studio; Moon Recording; Música Futura Studios; South Point Studios (Miami, FL); North Bay Recording Studios (Miami Beach, FL); The Loft Studios (Bronxville, NY)
- Genres: Latin pop; pop rock; teen pop; soft rock; latin ballad
- Length: 50:59
- Language: Spanish · English
- Label: Sony Discos
- Producers: Gustavo Arenas; Mike Couzzi; Alejandro Jaén; César Lemos; Rudy Pérez; Evan Rogers; Carl Struken; Tommy Torres; Rick Wike; Bruce Weeden; Óscar Llord (Executive producer)

MDO chronology
Un Poco Más (1999)	Subir Al Cielo (2000)	Little Piece of Heaven (2001)

Subir al Cielo (trals. A Climb from the Sky) is a third studio album recorded by the Latin American boy band MDO, The album witch released by Sony Discos on October 31, 2000 (see 2000 in music). The lineup included Abel Talamántez, Alexis Grullón, Didier Hernández, and Anthony Galindo, who left the group early in the project and was replaced by Pablo Portillo and Troy Tuminelli.

The album showcased a more mature and pop sound, blending elements of pop rock and romantic ballads. Produced by industry heavyweights such as Rudy Pérez and Emilio Estefan, the album featured a contemporary sound with sophisticated musical arrangements. The track "Te Quise Olvidar" gained significant airplay on U.S. radio stations. Additionally, the inclusion of two English-language tracks, "Someone Help Me" and "Lock All Doors," demonstrated the group's ambition to conquer international markets and expand its audience.

== Production and recording ==
The recordings took place between June and July 2000 at EQ Studios in Miami, Florida. The album was produced alongside another English-language album, which would be released later. A substantial number of producers, including Rudy Pérez, Emilio Estefan, Marco Flores, and Alejandro Jaén, contributed to the project. The compositions by Yasmil Marrufo, Carlos Baute, Karla Aponte, and Evan Rogers resulted in a Latin work with strong American influences.

The members were involved in the composition and production process, agreeing that working under the direction of various producers would be advantageous. According to Abel: "We worked hard for a year on both albums and decided to have a diverse mix of producers from different parts of the world to give the work a varied flavor and avoid monotony."

== Release and promotion ==
The album was released on October 31 and contains eleven tracks, including two in English: "Someone Help Me" and "Lock All Doors," serving as a preview of the English album to be launched in the United States in January 2001. The English album would feature versions of songs from Subir al Cielo, along with a new name, cover, and five original tracks. The group's manager, Edgardo Díaz, stated that, due to marketing strategies, the Spanish material would precede the English album. "First, we'll release the album in Spanish because we'll visit some places in Latin America, but then we'll move forward with the English album because we want to achieve great success in the United States," commented member Pablo.

As part of the promotion, the label planned international trips to countries like Panama, the Dominican Republic, and Venezuela, where the quintet aimed to establish their own identity, apart from the fame of previous members like Ricky Martin, Robi Draco Rosa, and Charlie Massó. The promotional tour, which began before the album's release, included stops in countries such as the United States, Puerto Rico, Peru, Venezuela, Colombia, and Central America.

During promotional efforts, two members left the group. The first to leave was Alexis, who later regretted his decision and returned shortly afterward. His change of heart came after Sony Music and K Note, Edgardo Díaz's company, filed a $400,000 breach-of-contract lawsuit against him. Around the same time, Sony executives decided that Troy Tuminelli should leave the group because he was not committed to Spanish or dance lessons. He was replaced by 22-year-old Puerto Rican Calev Aviles, who joined the band during a charity event for the Red Cross in Puerto Rico. Carlos Cambiazzo, the group's spokesperson in Mexico, stated that the English material recorded by MDO for upcoming release would feature modified vocals in the tracks previously sung solo by Troy, but no changes would be made to the songs performed by Didier, Pablo, and Abel. He added, "At first, it was just a rumor that Alexis would return, and today it's a fact. He will join the promotional activities for Subir al Cielo and then continue preparing for the English album release, which will take place at Sony Music's international convention in Asia within a few weeks."

== Singles ==
"Te Quise Olvidar" was the album's lead single to be released, on October 2, 2000. This is a song written and originally performed by Venezuelan singer-songwriter Carlos Baute for his studio album Yo Nací Para Quererte (1999). The track, a ballad, explores "the obsession with a lost love and the futile attempt to forget by finding someone new." The MDO music video was co-directed by Pablo Croce and Tony Van Den-ende and filmed in a Venezuelan desert, where many crew members suffered burns on their feet. The song was also the main theme of the telenovelas Muñeca Brava and Alma rebelde.

A norteño version and an English version were also recorded, the latter titled "So Hard to Forget." A salsa version was later recorded and included in the compilation 2002 Ultimate Mega Hits (2002). Other adaptations include salsa versions by Japhet Albert and Moa Rivera, which peaked at positions 31 and 21, respectively, on the Billboard Tropical Airplay charts, along with regional Mexican versions by El Bebeto and Siggno (numbers 14 and 43 in Mexico).

In the United States, "Te Quise Olvidar" reached the number one spot on the Billboard Hot Latin Tracks chart for three weeks. On the year-end chart for 2001, which featured the most-played songs across several Billboard charts, the song ranked number three on Hot Latin Tracks and number 15 on Hot Tropical/Salsa Airplay.

Following the success of their lead single, the group sought a worthy successor. According to member Pablo, "After the success we achieved with our lead single, 'Te Quise Olvidar,' which placed us at the top of the charts on Billboard and in most countries across the [American] continent, we are now putting all our hope and energy into the second single." "Sin Ti" was released as the second single. On the Hot Latin Tracks chart, it peaked at number 36 for two weeks. On the Latin Pop Airplay chart, it reached number 23, while on the Latin Tropical/Salsa Airplay chart, it peaked at number 38.

"Cuatro Paredes" was the last single to be released.

== Critical reception ==
Professional ratings
Review scores
Source	Rating
AllMusic	3/5 stars
La Opinión	Favorable

Regarding reviews from music critics, the reviewer from AllMusic rated the album three out of five stars but did not provide any commentary on the album.

Ursula Ramos, from the newspaper La Opinión, rated the album two out of five "balls," labeling it "Trendy." She wrote that while people criticized the group for their resemblance to bands like the Backstreet Boys and for following a fleeting formula, she enjoyed the songs "Cuatro paredes," "Yo no tengo corazón," "Baila," "Te quise olvidar," and "Sin ti."

== Awards and nominations ==
At the Billboard Latin Music Awards, the album was nominated in the category of Pop Album of the Year (Group), competing against El Sapo by Azul Azul, CD00 by OV7, and the winner Mi Gloria, Eres Tú by Los Trí-O.

== Commercial performance ==
The album achieved success on the Latin album charts of Billboard magazine. It debuted at number 42 on the Billboard Top Latin Albums. In January 2001, it reached its peak position at number two on the chart. In the year-end chart of the same magazine, which listed the best-selling Latin albums in the United States in 2001, it ranked at number 68.

On May 5, 2001, Billboard magazine reported that the album had been certified gold for 50,000 copies sold in the United States. The Recording Industry Association of America (RIAA) certified it as platinum for selling 100,000 copies in the United States in 2001.

== Tracklist ==
No.	Title	Writer(s)	Singer	Length
1.	"Cuatro Paredes"	Alejandro Jaén; William Paz; Abel Talamantez; Tommy Torres	Alexis Grullón	3:55
2.	"Te Quise Olvidar"	Carlos Baute; Yasmil Marrufo	Pablo Portillo	4:24
3.	"Déjame Subirte Al Cielo"	Amado Jaén; Evan Rogers; Carl Sturken	Abel Talamantez	4:07
4.	"A Mi Amor Tu Vas A Extrañar"	Rudy Pérez; Bruce Weeden	Troy Tuminelli	3:33
5.	"Baila"	Karla Aponte; César Lemos	Pablo Portillo	3:11
6.	"Sin Tí"	Omar Alfanno	Pablo Portillo, Didier Hernández and Abel Talamantez	3:25
7.	"Tonight, Te Amaré"	Karla Aponte; César Lemos; Abel Talamantez	Didier Hernández	3:33
8.	"Es La Cosa"	William Paz; Evan Rogers; Abel Talamantez	Abel Talamantez	3:58
9.	"Yo No Tengo Corazón"	William Paz	Pablo Portillo	4:02
10.	"Someone Help Me!"	Abel Talamantez	Troy Tuminelli	3:55
11.	"Locks All the Doors"	Didier Hernández; Abel Talamantez; Tommy Torres	Didier Hernández	3:54
12.	"So Hard to Forget"	Carlos Baute; Yasmil Marrufo	Alexis Grullón	4:25
13.	"Te Quise Olvidar [Versión Norteña]"	Carlos Baute; Yasmil Marrufo	Pablo Portilo	3:33

== Singles ==
- "Te Quise Olvidar"
- "Sin Ti"
- "A Mi Amor Tu Vas a Extrañar"

== Credits and personnel ==
=== Personnel ===
- Pedro Alfonso – piano
- Pete Amato – scat
- Gustavo Arenas – arranger, producer
- Richard Bravo – mixing, percussion
- Ed Calle – baritone saxophone, tenor saxophone
- Gustavo Celis – digital editing, engineer, vocal engineer
- Tony Concepción – horn arrangements, trumpet
- Mike Couzzi – mixing engineer, producer
- Andrea Derby – production coordination
- Jorge Dobal – horn
- Jose Luis Galvis – assistant engineer
- Al Hemberger – engineer
- Julio Hernández – bass
- Alejandro Jaén – producer, Spanish version
- César Lemos – arranger, acoustic guitar, guitar programming, keyboard programming, keyboards, producer, programming
- Lee Levin – drums
- Óscar Llord – executive producer
- Miami Symphonic orchestra – string ensemble
- Alfredo Oliva – concertina
- Carlos Paucar – engineer
- Richie Pérez – engineer
- Rudy Pérez – producer
- Clay Perry – keyboards, programming
- Elias Jr. Ponce – assistant engineer, engineer
- Cheito Quiñones – trumpet
- Leo Quintero – acoustic guitar
- Daniel Ramos – accordion, arranger, keyboards
- Silvio Richetto – digital editing
- Evan Rogers – producer
- Carl Sturken – guitar, producer
- Dana Teboe – trombone
- Michael Hart thompson – guitar
- Tommy Torres – drum programming, guitar, keyboards, mixing, producer
- Adrian Trujillo – audio engineer
- Camilo Valencia – arranger, horn arrangements, percussion
- Rick Wake – producer
- Dan Warner – electric guitar
- Dave Way – mixing
- Bruce Weeden – arranger, engineer, mixing, producer
- Doc Wiley – engineer

== Members ==
- Abel Talamantez
- Alexis Grullón
- Troy Curtis
- Didier Hernández
- Pablo Portillo

== Charts ==
=== Weekly charts ===
Music Chart (2000–2001)	Peak Position
United States (Billboard Top Latin Albums)	2
United States (Billboard Latin Pop Albums)	2
United States (Billboard Top Heatseekers)	23

=== Year-end charts ===
Music Chart (2001)	Position
United States (Billboard Top Latin Albums)	68

== Certifications ==
Region	Certification	Certified units/sales
United States (RIAA)	Platinum (Latin)	100,000^{^}
^{^} Shipments figures based on certification alone.
