= DJ Kane =

- Also known as: DJ Kane
- Born: Jason Cano; Houston, Texas, United States
- Origin: Corpus Christi, Texas, United States
- Genres: Cumbia, Latin pop, Tejano, reggae, R&B
- Occupations: Singer, songwriter, record producer, dancer
- Instruments: Vocals, conga
- Years active: 1994–present
- Labels: EMI Latin

Jason Cano (born in Houston, Texas), better known as DJ Kane, is an American singer who was the lead vocalist for the Kumbia Kings from 1999 to 2003 and the Kumbia All Starz from 2008 to 2010. He then went on to become a successful solo artist.

== Discography ==
- DJ Kane (2004)
- Capítulo II: Brinca (2005)
- Capítulo III: Ahogando Penas (2007)
