= Los Super Reyes =

American musical group

- Also known as: Kumbia Kings, Los Kumbia de Cruz Martínez, Cruz Martínez's Reyes
- Origin: Corpus Christi, Texas, United States
- Genre: Cumbia
- Years active: 2007–present (Using Kumbia Kings name: 2017–present)
- Label: Warner Music Latina
- Past members: Cruz Martínez; Abel Talamántez; Nando Domingez; Jo-Joe; BZ aka Mannie B Reynold Martínez; Roy "Slim" Ramírez; Robbie Del Moral; Albert "Tiko" Akui; Alex Ramírez; Papi-Joe; Pancho; Nino B Pangie; Megga; Menor; JP; Juan "Pauly" Hernández; Aldo Ramón; Joel Garza
- Website: www.lossuperreyes.com

Los Super Reyes are an American musical group from Corpus Christi, Texas, created by Cruz Martínez. Martínez created the group after he and A.B. Quintanilla had arguments over Martínez selling Quintanilla's group they were both in at the time, Los Kumbia Kings. A.B. Quintanilla left the group he had created along with other members and created Kumbia All Starz. Cruz Martínez kept the remaining members of Los Kumbia Kings and use his half of the group to create Los Super Reyes.

== History ==
=== 2007–2008: Kumbia Kings Controversy and El Regreso de los Reyes ===
Many members of Kumbia All Starz, Kingz One, and Los Super Reyes were formerly together as Kumbia Kings, which had much success but unfortunately, this was bittersweet for the group amidst the controversy and love/hate relationship between the co-producers of Kumbia Kings, A.B. Quintanilla and Cruz Martínez, as well as the other members and ex-members of the group. A.B. Quintanilla, the founder of Kumbia Kings, left the group and early in the summer of 2006 formed Los Kumbia All Starz.

Cruz Martínez continued with the other half of Los Kumbia Kings until he decided to change the name of the group he now headed to Los Super Reyes. Many of the members of the Kumbia Kings opted to stay with Cruz and released their first album, El Regreso de los Reyes, as Los Super Reyes in August 2007. The album reached number 3 on the US Billboard Top Latin Albums chart and number 1 on the US Billboard Regional Mexican Albums chart. Their first single, titled "Muévelo" has topped Latin radio airwaves in the United States as well as Latin America.

A.B. Quintanilla successfully petitioned Mexican courts to claim the naming rights to "Los Kumbia Kings", though there really was not much opposition. As fellow Kumbia Kings founder Cruz Martínez never pursued litigation to retain or share the naming rights with Quintanilla. The name "Los Kumbia Kings" is retired according to Quintanilla, though rumors persist that "Los Kumbia Kings" will resurface at a later date with new band members.

On March 28, 2008, Cruz Martínez once again faced controversy but this time with lead singer Nando, and it led to Nando leaving the band and making his own band called Nando y Solja Kingz, and Robbie would also leave Los Super Reyes to join him. After Nando left, rumors started in early May that Pee Wee, former Kumbia Kings and Kumbia All Starz member, might join the band. Cruz Martínez offered Pee Wee if he wanted to join the band that same month, but Pee Wee declined due to his desire to become a solo singer. Cruz Martínez then told Pee Wee that the door was always open for him if he ever wanted to join Los Super Reyes.

Los Super Reyes after their huge success on the debut album have continue to tour all Latin America and for the first time in King history will be headed to Japan in October 2008 and Spain in November 2008 due to international hit "Muévelo" which has also certified the group for platinum and gold record sales between the United States and Mexico. The group is again expected to release another very anticipated studio album early 2009.

=== 2009–2010: Cumbia con Soul and Kumbia Kings Reunion ===
It was announced by A.B. Quintanilla and Cruz Martínez themselves that the Kumbia Kings will reunite again. An exclusive interview was given on October 26, 2009 through Ventaneando America. The reunion concert was held at Palacio de los Deportes in Mexico City, Mexico on November 21, 2009. The concert started with guest singer Flex who sang songs like "Te Quiero", "Escápate", "Si No Te Tengo", "Dime Si Te Vas Con Él" and "Te Amo Tanto". Then Cruz Martínez & Los Super Reyes sang songs like "Tu Magia", "No Tengo Dinero", "Muchacha Triste", "Sabes a Chocolate", "Na Na Na (Dulce Niña)", "Preso", "Yo Seré", "Todavía", "Quédate Más (I Want You Back)", "Eres" and "Muévelo". Then A.B. Quintanilla & Kumbia All Starz sang songs like "Mami", "Reggae Kumbia", "Dijiste", "Por Ti Baby" with Flex, performed a special tribute to Michael Jackson and Selena Quintanilla, and "Parece Que Va a Llover". For the grand finale A.B. Quintanilla and Cruz Martínez and the rest of the Kumbia Kings got on stage and sang songs like "Pachuco", "Te Quiero a Ti", "Desde Que No Estás Aquí", "Fuiste Mala", "Dime Quién", "Se Fue Mi Amor", "Azúcar", "Boom Boom" and "Shhh!".

In the summer of 2010, it was stated that Joseph "Jo-Joe" Alicea López left the group. There were several interviews where Jo-Joe declared he had troubles with Cruz Martínez. Although he is not in the group, he still wants to study music and become a solo artist. Later in his life he became a lead singer in a group as his dreams were so much pressure. His group's name was Los Chicos y Yo meaning "Me and the Boys" or "The Boys and Me" in English.

== Band members ==
Former members

- Cruz Martínez – Keyboards, Backing Vocals, Producer (2007–2010)
- Abel Talamántez – Vocalist (2007–2010)
- Reynold Martínez – Guitar (2007–2010)
- Pangie – Vocalist (2007–2010)
- Megga – Vocalist (2007–2010)
- Menor – Vocalist (2007–2010)
- JP – Dancer, Vocalist (2007–2010)
- Juan "Pauly" Hernández – Accordion (2009–2010)
- Aldo Ramón – Bass Guitar (2009–2010)
- Ronnie "Campa" Delgado - Timbales, Percussionist, Drummer (2007–2009)
- Joel Garza – Drums (2010–2010)
- Slim Ramírez – Percussion (2007)
- Nando – Lead Vocalist (2007–2008)
- Robbie Del Moral – Drums (2007–2008)
- Albert "Tiko" Akui – Percussion (2007-2008)
- Alex Ramírez – Keyboards (2007–2009)
- Papi-Joe – Vocalist (2007–2009)
- Pancho – Bass Guitar (2007–2009)
- Jo-Joe – Vocalist (2007–2010)
- BZ now known as Mannie B – Dancer, Singer (2008–2009)
- Nino B – Dancer, Vocalist (2007–2010)

== Discography ==
Los Super Reyes discography
- Studio albums: 2
- Singles: 6
- Music videos: 6

=== Studio albums ===
List of studio albums, with selected chart positions, sales figures and certifications
Title	Album details	Peak chart positions				Sales	Certifications
Title	Album details	US	US Latin	US Regional Mexican	MEX	Sales	Certifications
El Regreso de los Reyes	Released: August 14, 2007; Label: Warner Music Latina; Format: CD, digital download	130	3	1	27	US: 100,000	RIAA: Platinum (Latin); AMPROFON: Gold
Cumbia con Soul	Released: June 30, 2009; Label: Warner Music Latina; Format: CD, digital download	—	16	8	63		
"—" denotes releases that did not chart or were not released in that territory.

=== Singles ===
Title	Year	Peak chart positions							Album
Title	Year	US Latin	US Latin Pop	US Latin Rhythm	US Regional Mexican	US Tropical	MEX Airplay	MEX Popular Airplay	Album
"Muévelo"	2007	11	37	13	21	11	—	—	El Regreso de los Reyes
"Serenata (Estrellita Mía)"	2007	—	—	—	—	—	—	—	El Regreso de los Reyes
"Muchacha Triste" (featuring Dax "El Coyote")	2008	—	—	—	—	—	—	—	El Regreso de los Reyes
"Yo Seré" (featuring Slim, Megga, Pryme Status and Big Metra)	2008	—	—	—	—	—	—	—	El Regreso de los Reyes
"Eres"	2009	22	28	—	26	19	18	5	Cumbia con Soul
"Todavía"	2009	—	—	—	—	—	—	—	Cumbia con Soul
"—" denotes a recording that did not chart or was not released in that territory.

=== Promotional singles ===
Title	Year	Peak chart positions							Album
Title	Year	US Latin	US Latin Pop	US Latin Rhythm	US Regional Mexican	US Tropical	MEX Airplay	MEX Popular Airplay	Album
"Eclipse"	2012	—	—	—	—	—	—	—	Non-album single
"—" denotes a recording that did not chart or was not released in that territory.

=== Music videos ===
Title	Year	Album	Other performer(s) credited	Director(s)	Description	Ref(s)
"Muévelo"	2007	El Regreso de los Reyes	None	Unknown	Cruz Martínez & Los Super Reyes perform the song in a high-end club. The video begins with the audience sitting in their tables being bored of the club entertainment. Los Super Reyes get on stage, Cruz Martínez gives a spoken intro and they begin to perform. Nando Domínguez is the main vocalist, Pangie Pangelinan is the second vocalist and other members are dancing or performing on their instruments as well as providing backing vocals. The audience starts to enjoy their performance. Megga and Slim add a potion called "Para Poner a Bailar" ("To Make You Dance") to the drinks of the audience. The audience begins to loosen up, sipping their drinks, starts dancing at their tables, and as the performance goes on, the audience get off their tables and starts dancing near the stage.	
"Serenata (Estrellita Mía)"	2007	El Regreso de los Reyes	None	Unknown	Cruz Martínez & Los Super Reyes perform the song in the street and under the house window of the female love interest. Jo Joe is the main protagonist of the video and the main vocalist of the song with Abel Talamántez providing vocals for a verse. Jo Joe serenades the girl and takes her around the world in a magic carpet, in a reference to the 1992 animated film Aladdin.	
"Muchacha Triste"	2008	El Regreso de los Reyes	Dax "El Coyote"	Unknown	Cruz Martínez & Los Super Reyes perform the song at a beach in pirate attire. Four women are running away from another group of pirates. Jo Joe notices them and another woman comes up to Jo Joe and pleads for help. The women are kidnapped by the rival group of pirates. Jo Joe asks the rest of the Super Reyes to help him rescue the women. The rival group of pirates take the women to their ship and force them to do physical labor. Los Super Reyes aboard the ship and fight the rival pirates. They defeat them, rescue the women and take them back to the beach. The women embrace the Super Reyes members. Jo Joe kisses his girl and heads back to his group.	
"Yo Seré"	2008	El Regreso de los Reyes	Slim; Megga; Pryme Status; Big Metra	Unknown	Cruz Martínez & Los Super Reyes are dressed in Cowboy and Native American attire in a Wild West setting and perform the song. A sheriff who looks like A.B. Quintanilla III is the main antagonist as the song is a diss track against him. Cruz Martínez, dressed in Native American attire, confronts the A.B. Quintanilla look alike sheriff at the end of the video. Premiered on Pepsi Música on Mun2 and presented by Roser Cabanas on August 1, 2008.	
"Eres"	2009	Cumbia con Soul	None	Chiva	Cruz Martínez & Los Super Reyes perform the song in a private high school at the courtyard and all members are wearing long sleeve white shirts and gold pants. Jo Joe is a student at the school and wears a school uniform. He is outside the classroom of his girlfriend in the hall and waits for class to be over as the clock is ticking so he can see her. He is discovered by a school security guard and is chased throughout the school until the security guard loses him. The clock dismisses the students from class and Jo Joe is outside of the classroom where his girlfriend meets him there and he gives her a flower.	
"Todavía"	2009	Cumbia con Soul	None	Bronson Del Rio	Cruz Martínez & Los Super Reyes perform the song in a public high school and all members wear white shirts, unzipped red and white tracksuit jackets, khaki shorts, long white socks, and white sneakers. Pangie and Abel are in the school cafeteria and Abel notices a girl across at the door and develops romantic feelings for her. Pangie and Abel sneak out of school early and Abel sabotages the front tire of the girl's motor scooter. The school day ends with all the students leaving and the girl realizes her front tire is flat. Abel comes up to her and offers his love interest a ride on his vehicle and she accepts. The next day, several Super Reyes members as students and other students are in a classroom and leave after class ends. Abel and Pangie notices Abel's love interest is dating Juan "JP" Peña. She and JP get into an argument where he yells at her and breaks up with her. Abel shoves JP and yells at him for his actions. Abel then walks up to the girl and comforts her. He tries to kiss her but she hugs him instead. At the school dance, Abel is about to approach his love interest but sees she and JP kissing each other and realizes they are back together. Pangie also notices and tells Abel to forget about her as they both walk away.	
