= Ricky López =

Puerto Rican musician

- Also known as: Ricky III
- Origin: Puerto Rico
- Genres: Latin music, Pop
- Years active: 1993-1995, 1998

José Ricardo "Ricky" López Jiménez (born September 6, 1980) is a singer and former member of the well known boy band, Menudo.

== Singing career ==
Ricky López was discovered musically at age 13, when he was chosen to become a member of Menudo. Edgardo Diaz chose to nickname him "Ricky III", because of Ricky Meléndez and Ricky Martin's earlier stints in the group. López soon became known as "Ricky III" by Menudo fans in Puerto Rico and the rest of Latin America.

At Menudo, López recorded two CDs: "Imagínate" -translation "Imagine That!"-, which was done in Spanish, and "Vem Pra Mim", which was released in Portuguese specifically for the band's Brazilian fan base.

He left the band in 1995.

"Ricky 3" had an accident in 2004 and was in a coma for about a month, but survived, although with multiple injuries that left him in a wheelchair.
