= Esmi Talamantez =

American singer

- Born: Esmeralda Talamantez Mendoza; Pecos, Texas
- Origin: Pecos, Texas
- Genres: Cumbia, Tejano, pop, rock, rhythm and blues
- Occupations: singer, songwriter
- Labels: Fonovisa
- Website: Esmi Talamantez

Esmeralda Talamantez Mendoza is a Tejano singer who with the band Viento Loco.

Mendoza's song "Con El Tiempo" appeared on the Hot Latin Songs chart at #39, in the week of September 30, 1995.

== Discography ==
- 1995: Esmi Talamantez (Fonovisa)
- 1996: Si Supieras (Fonovisa)
- 1997: Alas De Un Sueño (Fonovisa)
