= Abel Talamántez =

American singer

- Born: Abel Talamántez Mendoza; October 16, 1978 (age 47); Pecos, Texas, U.S.
- Origin: Tejano
- Genres: Cumbia, Latin Pop, Tex-Mex
- Occupations: Singer, Songwriter, Record Producer
- Years active: 1991 – present
- Labels: McGillis Records (1991–1995); Sony International (1997–2003); EMI (2003–2006); Warner Music Group (2007–Present)

Abel Talamántez Mendoza (born October 16, 1978, in Pecos, Texas), is an American singer, songwriter and record producer. He is currently a vocalist for the bands Cruz Martínez Y Los Super Reyes and Los EnVivo Kings. He is also a former member of the bands Menudo, MDO, and A.B. Quintanilla Y Los Kumbia Kings. Talamántez was the second member of Mexican origin in Menudo.

== Biography ==
Abel Talamántez Mendoza was born in Pecos, Texas, to Mexican parents. Talamántez grew up playing basketball with his elder brother (who would join La Sombra, with Cruz Martínez, owner and founder of international groups Kumbia Kings and Los Super Reyes) and three sisters (who would form Esmi Talamántez Y Viento Loco). He became a member of the famous Puerto Rican music group, Menudo, in 1992, after several group members had left the group in the middle of a scandal that had threatened to break up the band. Edgardo Díaz held auditions and Talamántez, among others, were chosen as the new members of Menudo. In Menudo, Abel got to share the stage with the only member of the group who stayed through the scandal, Mexican singer Adrián Olivares, who was the first non-Puerto Rican member of Menudo. For a short period, Talamántez moved to Puerto Rico with the rest of the band.

Although the often called golden age of Menudo (1981 - 1987) had already passed, the group still had vast fame across Latin America and among Hispanic communities in the United States. It was due to this that Abel became a teen idol among Hispanic girls during his first few years with Menudo.

In 1996, now with Didier Hernández among Menudo's members, the group changed its name to MDO. Talamántez kept being a member of the group, which, by then, approached a more mature audience, allowing its members to stay in the group past the age of 16. Along with the other members, Abel moved to Miami, Florida.

During the 2000s, MDO kept on touring across Latin America and, particularly, in the Southwestern states of the United States. In 2003, Abel officially ended his relationship with the organization when MDO stopped performing and Díaz started a teen-based group in 2005 named Tick Tock.

Soon after, he was contacted by A.B. Quintanilla, brother of slain Tejano music star Selena and founding leader of Los Kumbia Kings. Talamántez quickly accepted Quintanilla's offer to become a member of the famed band. One of the major hits the band has had since Abel became a member was a remake of a 1984 Menudo hit, "Sabes a Chocolate" ("You Taste Like Chocolate").

In 2005, Talamántez was touring with Los Kumbia Kings. Now he's in a group called Los Super Reyes. The entire album El Regreso de los Reyes was produced, arranged and mixed by Cruz Martínez, which due to the huge success has received platinum and gold records for its sales in the United States and Mexico. Rumor had it that Los Super Reyes were themselves working in Martínez's studio on another very anticipated album which was scheduled for an early 2009 release.

In late 2011 and early 2012, Abel reunited with his former MDO bandmates Alexis Grullon, Anthony Galindo, Didier Hernandez, Daniel René and embarked on an MDO reunion tour, visiting countries like Peru, Puerto Rico, Colombia, Panama, etc.

Abel currently resides in Mexico City, has his own record label "Abel'z Label" and works as a producer; having produced Marile Andrade album and is currently working on her second album. He recently launched his new project Chicodelicos, working with the nephew of the late Mexican Comedian-singer, Chico Che. They are rendering Che's tribute to the new generation by bringing in new sound fuses.

In December 2018, the MDO band, including Talamántez released a single titled Enamorao.

== Discography ==
=== Albums With La Sombra de Chicago ===
- 1988: "Strikes Again"
- 1988: "Chicago's Wild Side"
- 1989: "One of a Kind"
- 1989: "The Chi-Town Boys R Back"
- 1990: "Good Boys Wear White"
- 1991: "Porque Te Quiero"
- 1992: "Intocable"

=== Albums With Menudo ===
- 1991: Detrás de tu mirada
- 1992: Dancin', Movin', Shakin'
- 1992: 15 Años
- 1993: Vem Pra Mim
- 1993: Cosmopolitan Girl
- 1994: Imagínate...
- 1994: If You're Not Here
- 1996: Tiempo De Amar

=== Albums With MDO ===
- 1997: MDO
- 1999: Un Poco Más
- 2000: Subir Al Cielo
- 2001: Little Piece of Heaven
- 2002: Greatest Hits

=== Albums With Los Kumbia Kings ===
- 2004: Los Remixes 2.0
- 2004: Fuego
- 2005: Duetos
- 2006: Kumbia Kings Live

=== Albums With Los Super Reyes ===
- 2007: El Regreso de los Reyes
- 2009: Cumbia con Soul
