= Didier Hernández =

Cuban Artist. Singer Songwriter

- Born: Didier Hernández Fernández; July 18, 1979 (age 47); Havana, Cuba
- Genre: Pop
- Occupation: Singer
- Instrument: Vocals
- Years active: 1995–2002, 2011–present

Didier Hernández Fernández (born July 18, 1979 in Havana) is a Cuban singer who was a member of the well known boy band Menudo. He was one of the last members of the group to join while the band was still named "Menudo". Didier was a founding member of the boy band MDO, reaching numerous hits world-wide.

He has released multiple singles after his first solo album, titled 'Destino'. his second Album ' Asi Soy yo, Didi'

The latest releases can be heard on all platforms, as Didier constantly creates new music .

== Musical career ==
Didier Hernández was chosen as a member of Menudo in 1995; two years later, Edgardo Díaz had sold the band's original name and renamed it MDO. Bandmates were Abel Talamántez, Alexis Grullón, Edgar Antonio "Anthony" Galindo, Daniel René, Pablo Portillo, Troy Tuminelli, and Caleb Avilés.

During his seven years as a member of MDO, Hernández became a teen idol in Puerto Rico and across Latin America. He visited Europe and Asia, a total of 39 countries around the world, becoming a known artist among teenage Hispanic females in the United States. Hernández recorded a total of seven CDs during this period, including Tiempo de Amar ("Time to Fall in Love"), MDO, Un Poco Más ("A Little More"), Subir Al Cielo (which was also recorded in English as Little Piece of Heaven), and a greatest-hits CD.

Hernández continued with his singing career, trying to become a solo singer. After one year of music production he opened a record label called DGMUSIC, which was distributed by Sony/BMG, through Avalon and, on August 23, 2005, his first solo CD, titled Destino ("Destiny"), was released. That same day, he announced a deal with American retail chain Wal-Mart, where he would hold "sign and greet" sessions with fans who bought his CD. The first single "Diva" was released, followed by "Te Juro Amor" (I Swear to You My Love), finishing a promo tour in May 2006.

In 2006, Hernández opened a production company, Rec International, and recorded several music projects that were later released in 2008 via Synergy Entertainment, another company owned by Hernández.

Didier Hernández is currently the president of Trading Connections, an artist-booking agency.

In 2011, Didier Hernández reunited with former MDO members for a reunion tour that lasted until 2015, and the band released a single, "Ya No Queda Mas". An album, MDO Legacy V.1, released in 2018. In 2021 began releasing singles as a solo Artist but remained in the band touring with 90's Pop Tour and several MDO concerts until the beginning of 2025. Hernandez decides to quit the band and pursue his solo career. his latest album ' Asi Soy yo, Didi' was released in December 9, 2024 including 12 tracks and 11 music videos that were released since 2021.

Didier is working on a musical project to release 365 songs as part of a life challenge.

In may he incurred in the Tropical genre with a single for 'JN Music Group ' record company out of Florida and has three initial songs with a concept called ' Sabores' . 4 musical productions are to be released in the next three years.

== See also ==
- List of Cubans
