= MDO (band) =

Latin American boy band

- Origin: United States, Cuba, Dominican Republic, and Mexico
- Genre: Pop rock
- Years active: 1997–2002; 2005–2008; 2015–present
- Labels: Machete Music (2006–2008); Olé Music (2005); Sony Music (1997–2002)
- Members: Abel Talamántez; Alexis Grullón; Didier Hernández
- Past members: See the list below
- Website: Official website

MDO is a Latin American pop rock band, spun off in 1997 from the Latin American boy band once known as Menudo. The group's first line-up reunited for an international tour in 2015.

== Band history ==
In the mid-1990s, Edgardo Diaz, Menudo's creator and director, sold the rights for the trademarked name Menudo to a Panamanian company. After the release and promotion of Menudo's album Tiempo De Amar in 1996, the remaining line-up formed MDO under the direction and production of Diaz at first.

The members at the time were Abel Talamántez, Alexis Grullón, Anthony Galindo, Didier Hernández and Daniel René. Together they recorded the album MDO in 1997 (Gold Record). In 1999, they followed it with Un Poco Más. The album featured two English songs, "Groove With Me Tonight" and "Fantasy", in an attempt to cross-over to the US market, this album hit Platinum in sales and took MDO to #1 in US Billboard Hot Latin Tracks. The same happened with 2000's Subir Al Cielo which featured two more English singles, also went Platinum on record sales and #1 in US Hot Latin Tracks from Billboard.

The next year, in 2001 MDO released their 1st English album titled Little Piece of Heaven, which was distributed internationally through Columbia Records. Taking the boy band to Asia on a 1-year tour, MDO decided to take a break from the industry.

In mid-2004, it was announced that MDO would return with new members. Three of the new members (Daniel Rodríguez, Elliot Suro, and Luis Montes) were contestants from the first season of Puerto Rican reality/talent show Objetivo Fama with a fourth member, Lorenzo Duarte, to complete the line-up. Their first album was titled Otra Vez and the title single proved to be a successful hit. The group toured through Latin America and were nominated for several awards.

In 2007, the band returned with a new, more mature look, with the members playing instruments as opposed to Menudo's style of singing and dancing. Their final album, Sabe A Tí was released on February 12, 2008.

In 2011, five original band members reunited for an international tour for Puerto Rico, Central and South America. The band released a new single titled "Ya no queda más". In 2015, Pablo Portillo and Lorenzo Duarte also toured with them on a celebration tour along with former Menudo member Ashley Ruiz as a special guest.

In 2017 MDO formed part of the 90s Pop Tour and a live DVD was released through Sony Music and went Gold within hours of release.

In 2018 the " MDO is back" tour took place and as a result the band would release a new single with music video fall 2018. Enamorao was to be the comeback of the Latin sensation.

== Band members ==
Members	Ages in the group	Replaced by
Andy Blázquez	1997	Daniel René Weider
Abel Talamántez	1997-2002, 2015-	
Alexis Grullón	1997-2001, 2015-	
Didier Hernández	1997-2002, 2015-	
Edgar Antonio "Anthony" Galindo	1997-2000, 2002	Troy Tuminelli
Daniel René Weider	1997-98	Ricky Lopez
Ricky López	1998	Pablo Portillo (2000)
Troy Tuminelli	2000-01	Caleb Avilés
Pablo Portillo	2000-02	
Caleb Avilés	2001-02	Anthony Galindo
Elliot Suro	2005-08	
Daniel Rodríguez	2005-08	
Lorenzo Duarte	2005-08	
Luis Montes	2005-08	

== After MDO (2003–present) ==
Some of MDO's former members have continued with their musical careers:

- Daniel René Weider started a solo career in 2003.
- Abel Talamántez is currently a member of Los Kumbia Kings/Super Reyes.
- Pablo Portillo started a solo career.
- Anthony Galindo reunited with former Menudo members to form Menudo: La Reunion and toured Latin America with them. In 2006, he joined ex-Menudo Rubén Gómez and formed the duo Blacksheep. In late 2007 he joined Los Super Reyes but left in early 2009. On September 27, 2020, Galindo attempted to commit suicide. On October 3, 2020, Galindo died.
- Lorenzo Duarte started a solo career in 2009.
- Elliot Suro started a solo career in 2011.

== Discography ==
Release date	Album title	Label	Line-Up
July 1, 1997	MDO	Sony International	Abel Talamántez; Alexis Grullón; Anthony Galindo; Didier Hernández; Daniel René Weider
February 23, 1999	Un Poco Más	Sony International	Abel Talamántez; Alexis Grullón; Anthony Galindo; Didier Hernández
October 31, 2000	Subir Al Cielo	Sony International	Abel Talamántez; Alexis Grullón; Didier Hernández; Pablo Portillo; Troy Tuminelli
August 28, 2001	Little Piece of Heaven	Sony International	Abel Talamántez; Alexis Grullón; Didier Hernández; Pablo Portillo; Caleb Avilés
April 2, 2002	Greatest Hits: 5th Anniversary	Sony International	Abel Talamántez; Didier Hernández; Pablo Portillo; Anthony Galindo
June 24, 2003	Acústico	Sony International	
January 25, 2005	Otra Vez	Ole Music	Daniel Rodríguez; Elliot Suro; Lorenzo Duarte; Luis Montes
February 12, 2008	Sabe A Tí	Machete Music	Daniel Rodríguez; Elliot Suro; Lorenzo Duarte; Luis Montes

== Tours ==
- MDO Is Back Tour (2018)

Date (2018)	City	Country	Venue
August 18	Bogota	Colombia	Don Diego
August 24	Lima	Peru	CC Maria Angola
August 29	Panama City	Panama	Hotel Riu Plaza
August 30	Mexico City	Mexico	Arena CDMX (90s Pop Tour)
