= Menudo discography =

This is the discography for American boy band Menudo.

== Studio albums ==
List of studio albums, with selected chart positions and certifications
Title	Details	Chart positions			Sales
Title	Details	US	US Latin	US Latin Pop	Sales
Los Fantasmas	Released: 1977; Label: Padosa, Inc.; Formats: LP, Cassette, CD	—	—	—	Puerto Rico: 6,000
Laura	Released: 1978; Label: Padosa, Inc.; Formats: LP, cassette	—	—	—	
Chiquitita	Released: July 1, 1979; Label: Padosa, Inc.; Formats: LP, cassette	—	—	—	
Felicidades!	Released: 1979; Label: Padosa, Inc.; Formats: LP, cassette	—	—	—	
Más, Mucho Más	Released: 1980; Label: Padosa, Inc.; Formats: LP, cassette	—	—	—	
Es Navidad	Released: 1980; Label: Colibrí; Formats: LP, cassette	—	—	—	Venezuela: 150,000
Fuego	Released: 1980; Label: Colibrí; Formats: LP, cassette	—	—	—	Mexico: 500,000; Venezuela: 143,000
Xanadu	Released: 1981; Label: Interdisc; Formats: LP, cassette	—	—	—	
Quiero Ser	Released: 1981; Label: Colibrí; Formats: LP, cassette	—	—	—	Mexico: 500,000; Venezuela: 334,000
Por Amor	Released: 1982; Label: Raff; Formats: LP, cassette	—	—	—	Venezuela: 174,000
Una aventura llamada Menudo	Released: 1982; Label: Raff; Formats: LP, cassette	—	—	—	
A Todo Rock	Released: 1983; Label: RCA Records; Formats: LP, cassette	—	—	—	World: 1,000,000
Reaching Out	Released: 1984; Label: RCA Records; Formats: LP, cassette	108	—	—	Brazil: 1,000,000
Mania	Released: 1984; Label: RCA Records; Formats: LP, cassette	—	—	—	Brazil: 1,200,000
Evolución	Released: August 25, 1984; Label: RCA Records; Formats: LP, cassette	—	—	—	Brazil: 1,000,000
Menudo	Released: 1985; Label: RCA Records; Formats: LP, cassette	100	—	19	
Ayer y Hoy / A Festa Vai Começar	Released: 1985; Label: RCA Records; Formats: LP, cassette	—	—	19	
Viva! Bravo!	Released: 1986; Label: Globo Records; Formats: LP, cassette	—	—	—	
Refrescante...	Released: 1986; Label: RCA Records; Formats: LP, cassette	—	—	—	
Can't Get Enough	Released: 1986; Label: RCA Records; Formats: LP, cassette	—	—	—	
Somos Los Hijos del Rock	Released: 1987; Label: RCA Records; Formats: LP, cassette	—	—	—	
In Action	Released: 1987; Label: RCA Records; Formats: LP, cassette	—	—	—	
Sons of Rock	Released: 1988; Label: Blue Dog Records; Formats: LP, cassette	—	—	—	
Sombras & Figuras	Released: 1988; Label: Sonografica; Formats: LP, cassette	—	—	16	
Los Últimos Héroes	Released: April 18, 1989; Label: Sonografica; Formats: LP, cassette	—	—	—	U.S.: 40,000
Menudo: Edicion Brasil	Released: 1990; Label: RCA Victor; Formats: LP, cassette	—	—	—	
No Me Corten El Pelo	Released: 1990; Label: Sonografica; Formats: LP, cassette	—	—	—	
Detras de tu Mirada	Released: 1991; Label: Talento; Formats: LP, cassette	—	—	—	
15 Años	Released: 1992; Label: Philips; Formats: LP, cassette, CD	—	—	—	
Vem Pra Mim	Released: 1993; Label: Philips; Formats: LP, cassette, CD	—	—	—	
Imagínate	Released: 1994; Label: Talento; Formats: LP, cassette, CD	—	—	—	
Tiempo de Amar	Released: February 13, 1996; Label: Música Futura; Formats: CD	—	—	—	

== Live albums ==
List of studio albums, with selected chart positions and certifications
Title	Details	Chart positions
Title	Details	US Latin
El Reencuentro: 15 Años Después	Released: 1998; Label: Fonovisa; Formats: CD	7

== EPs ==
Title	Details
More Than Words	Release: 2007; Label: Epic; Formats: CD
Un Nuevo Comienzo (A New Beginning)	Release: 2023; Label: Mistar Entertainment, LLC; Formats: Digital
Party En California	Release: 2024; Label: Mistar Entertainment, LLC; Formats: Digital

== Compilations ==
List of compilations, with selected details and peak chart positions
Title	Details	Chart positions			
Title	Details	MEX	US	US Latin	US Latin Pop
De Colección	Released: 1982; Label: Raff; Formats: LP, cassette	—	—	—	—
Adios Miguel	Released: 1983; Label: RCA Victor; Formats: LP, cassette	—	—	—	—
Súper Exitos de Menudo	Released: 1983; Label: RCA; Formats: LP, cassette	—	—	—	—
Feliz Navidad	Released: 1983; Label: Profono International; Formats: LP, cassette	—	—	—	—
Con Amor - Tus Éxitos Favoritos	Released: 1984; Label: RCA; Formats: LP, cassette	—	—	—	—
15 Exitos	Released: 1984; Label: RCA; Formats: LP, cassette	—	—	—	—
16 Greatest Hits	Released: 1984; Label: RCA; Formats: LP, cassette	—	—	—	—
The Best of Menudo	Released: 1986; Label: RCA; Formats: LP, cassette	—	—	—	—
La Colección	Released: 1990; Label: RCA; Formats: LP, cassette	—	—	—	—
La Decada	Released: 1990; Label: RCA; Formats: LP, cassette	—	—	—	—
Cosmopolitan Girl	Released: 1993; Label: Discos Hispanos; Formats: Cassette	—	—	—	—
15 Años de Historia	Released: 1998; Label: RCA; Formats: CD	—	—	41	—
Colección Original	Released: 1998; Label: RCA; Formats: CD	—	—	—	—
Lo Mejor de Lo Mejor	Released: 1999; Label: RCA; Formats: CD	—	—	—	—
Menudo mix 1	Released: 1999; Label: RCA; Formats: CD	—	—	—	—
Menudo mix 2	Released: 1999; Label: RCA; Formats: CD	—	—	—	—
Menudo mix Enamorados del Amor	Released: 1999; Label: RCA; Formats: CD	—	—	—	—
Serie Plantino	Released: 2000; Label: RCA, BMG U.S. Latin; Formats: CD	—	—	—	—
Teen Riot featuring Hold Me	Released: 2000; Label: RCA; Formats: CD	—	—	—	—
La Historia	Released: 2007; Label: RCA; Formats: CD	16	190	10	4
La Historia De Menudo - Grandes Exitos	Released: 2007; Label: Sony BMG Music; Formats: CD	—	—	—	—
Mis Favoritas	Released: 2007; Label: Sony Music; Formats: CD	—	—	—	—
Enchanted Island	Released: 2011; Label: McGillis; Formats: CD	—	—	—	—

== Specials ==
- 1982 A Ritmo Menudo with Karla Maria
- 1983 Contigo Xavier with Karla Maria.
- 1986 King Holiday
- 1989 Nueva Navidad
- 1990 Optimismo

== Singles ==
Single	Year	US Hot 100	US Latin	US R&B
"A Volar"	1982	—	—	—
"Sabes a Chocolate"	1984	—	—	—
"Si Tú No Estás"/"If You're Not Here (By My Side)"	1984	_	—	36
"Não Se Reprima"	1984	—	—	—
"Like a Cannonball"	1984	—	—	—
"Motorcycle Dreamer"	1984	—	—	—
"Hold Me"	1985	62	—	61
"Please Be Good to Me"	1985	104	—	—
"Viva! Bravo!"	1985	—	—	—
"Explosion"	1985	—	—	—
"Come Home"	1985	—	—	—
"Besame"	1986	—	21	—
"Baci Al Cioccolato"	1986	—	—	—
"Diga Sim"	1986	—	—	—
"A Cara o Cruz"	1987	–	42	—
"Te Vere a Las Tres"	1987	—	45	—
"You Got Potential"	1988	—	—	—
"Historia Del Primer Amor"	1988	—	34	—
"Besame En La Playa"	1991	—	26	—
"Dancin, Movin, Shakin"	1992	—	—	—
"Juras De Amor"	1993	—	—	—
"Cosmopolitan Girl"	1993	—	—	—
"More Than Words (AEIOU)"	2008	—	—	—
"Perdido Sin Ti"/"Lost"	2008	—	—	—
"Mi Amore"	2023	—	—	—
"Feelin'"	2023	—	—	—
