= 15 Años de Historia =

Compilation album by Menudo
- Released: 1998
- Recorded: 1977–1985
- Genre: Pop
- Label: RCA

Menudo chronology
El Reencuentro: 15 Años Después (1998)	15 Años de Historia (1998)	La Historia (2007)

15 Años de Historia (official title including subtitle: 15 Años de Historia — El Fenómeno que Hizo Epoca) is a compilation album by Puerto Rican boy band Menudo, released on July 28, 1998, by the record labels RCA Records and BMG. The compilation, released as a double CD, includes songs originally featured on nine albums from Menudo's discography, released between 1979 and 1985. The record label decided to release the album due to the positive reception of the group's reunion of former members, titled El reencuentro: 15 años después....

In Brazil, BMG released an exclusive version adapted for the country, titled 15 Anos de História, which includes five songs in Portuguese and, in total, features only 16 tracks—nine of which are also on 15 años de historia. According to the newspaper O Pioneiro, the album brings together a selection of hits that marked the group's trajectory, performed by different members across the various lineups of the quintet.

== Songs ==
The tracklist for 15 años de historia features thirty songs from Menudo's albums released between 1977 and 1985. From their 1970s albums - Los fantasmas (1977) and Chiquitita (1979) - only one song from each was included, specifically their title tracks.

From their 1980s releases while signed to Puerto Rican label Padosa, the compilation includes: "Fuego" from Fuego (1981), "Voy a America" from Xanadu (1981), "Súbete a mi moto", "Mi banda toca rock", "Quiero ser", "Claridad", and "Rock en la TV" from Quiero ser (1981), "Lady", "Quiero Rock", "Es por amor", "Y yo no bailo", and "Dulces besos" from Por amor (1982), and "A volar", "Tú te imaginas", "Cámbiale las pilas", and "Lluvia" from Una aventura llamada Menudo (1982).

In 1983, the group signed a million-dollar contract with RCA Records, comparable to deals given to artists like Kenny Rogers and Diana Ross. Their first album under RCA was A todo rock (1983), featuring "Indianápolis", "Chicle de amor", "Si tú no estás", "No te reprimas", "Todo va bien", and "Zumbador". RCA aimed to establish Menudo as a globally recognized group. To achieve this, members re-recorded some of their earlier songs in English for the 1984 album Reaching Out, which includes "Like a Cannonball", also featured in the Burt Reynolds film Cannonball Run II. Also included are "Sabes a chocolate" and "Agua de limón" from Evolución (1984), "Hold Me" from Menudo (1985), and "La fiesta va a empezar" and "En San Juan me enamoré" from Ayer y hoy (1985).

The Brazilian edition, celebrating the boy band's 15-year career and titled 15 Anos de História, includes songs only from albums released in Brazil between 1984 and 1986. Some tracks appear in their Portuguese versions rather than the original Spanish. From Reaching Out (1984) are "If You're Not Here (By My Side)", "Indianapolis", and "Like a Cannonball". Mania (1984) contributes "Não Se Reprima", "Quero Ser", and "Troque Suas Pilhas". Evolución (1984) provides "Sabes a chocolate" and "Rayo de luna", while the 1985 self-titled album includes "Hold Me", "Oh, My Love", and "Please Be Good To Me". A Festa Vai Começar (1985) features "A Festa Vai Começar", "Viva! Bravo!", and "Aventureiros", and Can't Get Enough (1986) adds "Summer In The Streets" and "Old Enough To Love".

== Critical reception ==
Professional ratings
Review scores
Source	Rating
El Norte	10/10
Trip	5/5 stars

- 15 Años de Historia

Deborah Davis of the Mexican newspaper El Norte rated the album 10/10, praising it as Menudo's true musical legacy in contrast to El reencuentro: 15 años después..., released by former members under the "El Reencuentro" project. The review highlights the superior audio quality of the compilation's 30 tracks, noting sophisticated arrangements and musical references akin to artists like Mecano and Luis Miguel. Davis also emphasizes the group's historical influence on boy bands such as New Kids on the Block, and that while "El Reencuentro" featured mature but diminished vocals, 15 Años de Historia preserves Menudo's original youthful energy, making it the definitive choice for fans.

- 15 Anos de História: The Best of

In a satirical review for Trip, José Mojica Marins called Menudo "worse than the seven plagues of Egypt" and mocked their music (which his daughters adored). Nevertheless, he humorously recounted profiting from an exorcism gig at a stadium post-concert, concluding with a tongue-in-cheek "five stars for Menudo."

== Commercial performance ==
On August 29, 1998, the album debuted at number 49 among the fifty best-selling albums in the United States, on the Billboard magazine's Top Latin Albums chart. The album reached its peak position at number 41 on September 12, 1998, after being absent from the chart for two weeks. The following week, it remained at the same position, marking its final appearance on the chart.

On December 18, 2022, the digital remastered version of the album reached the 63rd position on the Apple Music Chart in Sweden.

== Track listing ==
15 años de historia
No.	Title	Writer(s)	Lead singer	Length
1.	"Súbete a mi moto"	A. Monroy, E. Díaz	René Farrait	3:30
2.	"Lady"	A. Monroy, C. Villa, J. Seijas	Johnny Lozada	3:35
3.	"Quiero Rock"	A. Monroy, C. Villa, J. Seijas	Miguel Cancel	2:32
4.	"Dulces besos"	A. Monroy, C. Villa, J. Seijas	Johnny Lozada	3:27
5.	"Fuego"	Leyda E. Colón	Group	3:02
6.	"Mi banda toca Rock"	Ivano Fussati	Johnny Lozada	2:56
7.	"A volar"	A. Monroy, C. Villa, E. Díaz	Miguel Cancel	4:12
8.	"Tu te imaginas"	A. Monroy, C. Villa	Miguel Cancel	3:14
9.	"Si tú no estás"	A. Monroy, C. Villa, E. Díaz	Ray Reyes	4:28
10.	"Agua de limón"	A. Monroy, C. Villa	Charlie Massó	4:12
11.	"Indianapolis"	A. Monroy, C. Villa	Charlie Massó	3:33
12.	"No te reprimas"	A. Monroy, C. Villa, E. Díaz	Charlie Massó	3:01
13.	"Sabes a chocolate"	A. Monroy, C. Villa	Robby Rosa	4:14
14.	"Los fantasmas"	H. Herrero	Group	3:00
15.	"Hold Me"	R. Rice	Robby Rosa	4:09
16.	"Rock en la T.V."	C. Villa, E. Díaz	Miguel Cancel, Xavier Serbiá	3:12
17.	"Quiero ser"	Pepe Luis Soto, E. Díaz	René Farrait	3:04
18.	"Cámbiale las pilas"	A. Monroy, C. Villa	Ricky Meléndez	3:29
19.	"Y yo no bailo"	A. Monroy, C. Villa, J. Seijas	Ricky Meléndez	2:41
20.	"Chiquitita"	J. Anderson, B. Ulvaeus, B. McCluskey	Fernando Sallaberry, Carlos Meléndez	5:03
21.	"La fiesta va empezar"	A. Monroy, C. Villa	Robby Rosa	4:19
22.	"Es por amor"	A. Monroy, C. Villa	Miguel Cancel	3:50
23.	"Claridad"	U. Tozzi	Group	4:10
24.	"Lluvia"	A. Monroy, C. Villa, E. Díaz	Group	3:06
25.	"Chicle de amor"	A. Monroy, C. Villa	Ray Reyes	2:43
26.	"Voy a America"	Eddy Guerin	René Farrait	2:55
27.	"Todo va bien"	A. Monroy, C. Villa	Charlie Massó	3:11
28.	"En San Juan me enamoré"	A. Monroy, C. Villa, E. Díaz	Raymond Acevedo	2:50
29.	"Zumbador"	A. Monroy, C. Villa	Ray Reyes	3:12
30.	"Like a Cannonball"	M.-L. Brown, S. Garret, S.H. Dorf	Robby Rosa	3:21

15 Anos de História: The Best of
No.	Title	Writer(s)	Lead vocals	Length
1.	"Don't Hold Back" (No te reprimas)	C. Villa, A. Monroy, E. Díaz, C. Colla	Charlie Massó	3:04
2.	"If You Not Here (By My Side)" (Si tú no estás)	C. Villa, A. Monroy, E. Díaz, M. Pagán	Robby Rosa	4:27
3.	"Change Your Batteries" (Cámbiale las pilas)	A. Monroy, C. Villa, C. Rabello	Ricky Meléndez	3:35
4.	"Rayo de luna"	C. Villa, A. Monroy	Ricky Martin	3:40
5.	"Viva! Bravo!"	A. Monroy, C. Villa, lyr. C. Colla	Charlie Massó	3:29
6.	"Like a Cannonball"	Snuff Garrett, Steve Dorff, Milton Brown	Robby Rosa	3:20
7.	"Oh, My Love"	C. Villa, A. Monroy, M. L. Pagán	Ricky Martin	3:49
8.	"I Want to Be" (Quiero ser)	E. Díaz, P. Soto, C. Colla	Ray Reyes	3:20
9.	"The Party's About to Start" (La fiesta va a empezar)	A. Monroy, C. Villa, lyr. C. Colla	Robby Rosa	3:40
10.	"Hold Me"	H. Rice	Robby Rosa	4:15
11.	"Summer in the Streets"	J. Palermo, E. Palermo	Robby Rosa	3:47
12.	"Adventurers" (Aventurero)	A. Monroy, C. Villa, M. L. Pagán, lyr. C. Colla	Raymond Acevedo	3:02
13.	"Please Be Good To Me"	C. Villa, A. Monroy, M. L. Pagán	Robby Rosa	4:53
14.	"Indianapolis"	Alejandro Monroy, Carlos Villa	Charlie Massó	3:34
15.	"Sabes a chocolate"	C. Villa, A. Monroy	Robby Rosa	4:14
16.	"Old Enough To Love"	H. Rice, A. R. Kimble	Robby Rosa	3:21

== Chart ==
Weekly chart performance for 15 Años de Historia
Chart (1998)	Peak position
Billboard Top Latin Albums	41
