= In Action (Menudo album) =

In Action!

Studio album by Menudo
- Released: 1987
- Recorded: 1987
- Genre: Pop
- Label: RCA Victor

Menudo chronology
| Somos Los Hijos Del Rock (1987) | In Action! (1987) | Sons Of Rock (1988) |

In Action! is the twenty-fifth studio album by the Puerto Rican boy band Menudo, released in 1987 by RCA Victor. The album is the second to feature the lineup of Ricky Martin, Raymond Acevedo, Sergio Blass, Ralphy Rodríguez, and Rubén Gómez, and the fourth to include songs in English. Additionally, it is the first album to feature tracks sung in Tagalog, one of the dominant languages of the Philippines, reflecting RCA's ongoing linguistic adaptation strategy to reach audiences in different countries.

The album's tracklist includes nine songs, seven of which are in English and two in Tagalog. The Tagalog tracks were originally recorded in Spanish and Portuguese on previous albums, except for the new song "That Situation."

Commercially, the album was a success, earning a gold record in the Philippines for its sales.

== Background ==
In 1987, Menudo celebrated its tenth anniversary with a commemorative tour that sold out shows across Latin America and the United States. Ralphy Rodríguez replaced Charlie Massó, the last remaining original member of the group. However, despite his official departure, Massó continued performing with the quintet until their successful tour in the Philippines, during which his farewell was finalized.

Upon invitation by a daughter of President Corazón Aquino, Menudo traveled to the Philippines, where they attracted 75,000 fans during a tour that included five shows at the Araneta Coliseum in Quezon City. The group's achievements in the Philippines led Menudo to record their first album in Tagalog.

== Song selection ==
From the album Por Amor (1982), a version of the song "Lady" was included. From Ayer y Hoy (1985), the track "Acércate" ("Nang Dahil Sa 'Yo") was selected. Representing the album Refrescante... (1986) is the song "La primera vez" ("Sa Bawat Halik"), while the Brazilian version of the album, titled Menudo, features the track "Come Back to Me," a version of "Diga Sim." From Somos Los Hijos del Rock (1987), the tracks "Estamos en acción" ("Action"), "Nena" ("Nena"), and "Mi Sombra En La Pared" ("My Shadow On The Wall") were included.

The digital version of the album included the bonus track "I'm Going Back to the Philippines," which was released as a single to promote the Philippines-exclusive compilation album The Best of Menudo (1986). This song is an English re-recording of the group’s earlier hit "Hoy Me Voy Para México," from Refrescante... (1986). Fans of the group often compare it to the 1976 song "Manila" by the Filipino band Hotdog, as both songs express a love for the country and the narrator’s longing to return home.

== Singles ==
The song "That Situation" is a danceable track in English, recorded in collaboration with Filipino singer Lea Salonga. The track was composed by Gary Valenciano (himself being half-Puerto Rican), with lyrics by Valenciano and Mary Lynne Paggan, and arrangements by Pedro Gely. The lyrics encourage teenagers to carefully reflect on decisions about sex, avoiding rushing into "that situation."

To promote the song, the artists performed it on the ABS-CBN show Kalatog Pinggan, where they sang "That Situation" and were interviewed by Pinky Marquez and Richard Gomez. The music video portrays two teenagers exchanging shy glances whenever they see each other at school. Salonga sings: "Wait and see what our love can be if we’re ready to face life together." The video was further promoted with a hotline that received over 22,000 calls in its first 18 months. Around the same time, a duet between Salonga and Charlie Massó titled "I Still Believe" was recorded, exploring a similar thematic approach.

Initially promoted as commercial projects, the songs achieved significant success and impact, reaching the top positions on the country's music charts. According to a survey conducted with young people in Metro Manila, 51% of respondents stated that the songs influenced them to discuss sexual responsibility with friends or parents.

Other singles from the album include "Nang Dahil Sa’yo" and "Salta La Valla."

== Commercial performance ==
The quintet embarked on a promotional tour for the album, visiting cities across the Philippines. During this period, the record label organized a press conference and awarded the group a gold disc for the album's outstanding performance in the country.

== Track listing ==
=== Original release ===
| No. | Title | Writer(s) | Lead vocalist | Length |
|---|---|---|---|---|
| 1. | "Come Back To Me" | Ed Wilson, C.Collo, M.L. Pagan | Ralphy Rodríguez | 3:40 |
| 2. | "That Situation (con Lea Salonga)" | G.Valenciano | Todos | 3:34 |
| 3. | "Action" | Sosa; Lupano; Topini; Pagan | Rubén Gómez | 3:26 |
| 4. | "Lady" | Monroy; Seijas; Villa | Rubén Gómez | 3:18 |
| 5. | "Nena" | Pedro Gely | Rubén Gómez | 2:52 |
| 6. | "Nang Dahil Sa 'Yo (Acercate)" | Villa; Monroy; Sanchez; | Raymond Acevedo | 4:01 |
| 7. | "My Shadow On The Wall" | Mary Lynne Pagan | Sergio Gonzalez | 4:26 |
| 8. | "Se Bawa't Halik (La Primera Vez)" | Villa; Monroy; Toribio | Ralphy Rodríguez | 4:12 |
| 9. | "Gimme More" | Pedro Gely | Ricky Martin | 4:07 |

=== Re-release/remastered/digital edition ===
| No. | Title | Writer(s) | Lead vocalist | Length |
|---|---|---|---|---|
| 1. | "I'm Going Back to the Philippines" | C. Villa, A. Monroy, M. L. Pagán | Raymond Acevedo | 3:54 |

== Certifications ==
| Region | Certification |
|---|---|
| Philippines | Gold |
