= La Historia (Menudo album) =

Compilation album by Menudo
- Released: 2007
- Recorded: 1979–1985
- Genre: Latin pop
- Label: Sony Music

Menudo chronology
| 15 Años de Historia (1998) | La Historia (2007) | More Than Words (2007) |

La Historia is a compilation album by the Puerto Rican boy band Menudo, released on July 10, 2007, by Sony Music. The collection gathers a selection of hits that marked the group's trajectory, featuring songs from nine of their albums released between 1979 and 1985.

The project was also released as a video album on DVD, with versions containing either 12 or 6 tracks. A condensed CD+DVD edition was also made available, featuring a CD with 16 songs. Commercially, the album charted in both Mexico and the United States, peaking at number 16 on the Mexican AMPROFON chart and at number 10 on the U.S. Billboard Top Latin Albums chart, becoming the group's highest-charting album on that list. The compilation received a favorable review from AllMusic, which highlighted its comprehensive overview of the band's evolving sound and cultural significance.

== Album details ==
The album gathers a selection of hits that marked the group's trajectory, performed by different members throughout the various lineups that made up the quintet.

The compilation includes songs originally featured on nine albums from Menudo's discography, released between 1979 and 1985. These include: Chiquitita (1979), Fuego (1981), Quiero Ser (1981), Una aventura llamada Menudo (1982), Por Amor (1982), A Todo Rock (1983), Evolución (1984), Ayer y Hoy (1985), and Menudo (1985).

A video album was released in DVD format, offering different versions and content for the audience. The full DVD version includes 12 tracks, composed of music videos and live performances. An alternative, more compact version contains only 6 videos. In addition, a condensed edition in CD+DVD format was released, featuring a CD with 16 songs and a DVD containing the same 6 videos.

== Critical reception ==
Professional ratings
Review scores
| Source | Rating |
|---|---|
| AllMusic | Favorable |

Regarding the reviews by music critics, AllMusic highlighted that for more sophisticated listeners, the group may be more interesting as a cultural phenomenon than for its music. However, the album La Historia presents both aspects of the group's success, showcasing its evolution from the late 1970s to the 2000s. It emphasized that the group's sound changed over time, with influences from synth-pop in the 1980s and elements of urban contemporary in the late 1990s. According to the critic, for those wishing to revisit Menudo's hits or understand its relevance as a unique cultural phenomenon, the compilation provides a comprehensive overview.

== Commercial performance ==
In Mexico, the album appeared on the Asociación Mexicana de Productores de Fonogramas y Videogramas (AMPROFON) chart of the best-selling albums of the week, debuting at number sixty-two in the 26th week of 2007. It peaked in the thirty-third week of 2007, reaching number sixteen. Its final appearance on the chart was in the 39th week of the same year, at number eighty-eight, in total, it spent fourteen weeks among the best-sellers in Mexico.

In the United States, it appeared on the Billboard 200 chart, marking the third and final time Menudo appeared on the list with one of their albums, with the other two being: Reaching Out, from 1984, and Menudo, from 1985. On the Billboard Top Latin Albums chart, it peaked at number 10, the best position of the quintet's career on that chart. On the Latin Pop Albums chart, it reached number 4, the second-best performance by the group on this music chart.

== Track listing ==
| No. | Title | Writer(s) | Original album (release) | Length |
|---|---|---|---|---|
| 1. | "Chiquitita" | J. Anderson, Buddy Mary McCluskey, Bjorn Ulvaeus | Chiquitita (1979) | 5:03 |
| 2. | "Ella ¡ah! ¡ah!" | G. Escolar, H. Herrero, Julio Seijas Cabezuelo, Vander Music | Chiquitita (1979) | 2:25 |
| 3. | "Fuego" | Leyda E. Colon | Fuego (1981) | 3:01 |
| 4. | "Claridad" | Umberto Tozzi | Quiero Ser (1981) | 4:10 |
| 5. | "Mi banda toca rock" | Ivano Fossati | Quiero Ser (1981) | 2:56 |
| 6. | "Súbete a mi moto" | E. Diaz, A. Monroy | Quiero Ser (1981) | 3:02 |
| 7. | "Quiero rock" | A. Monroy, Julio Seijas Cabezuelo, C. Villa | Por Amor (1982) | 3:28 |
| 8. | "Y yo no bailo" | A. Monroy, Julio Seijas Cabezuelo, C. Villa | Por Amor (1982) | 2:42 |
| 9. | "Es por amor" | Julio Seijas Cabezuelo, C. Villa | Por Amor (1982) | 3:50 |
| 10. | "Lluvia" | E. Diaz, A. Monroy, C. Villa | Una aventura llamada Menudo (1982) | 3:06 |
| 11. | "Cámbiale las pilas" | A. Monroy, C. Villa | Una aventura llamada Menudo (1982) | 3:29 |
| 12. | "A volar" | E. Diaz, A. Monroy, C. Villa | Una aventura llamada Menudo (1982) | 4:13 |
| 13. | "Quiero ser" | E. Diaz, Pepe Luis Soto | Quiero ser (1981) | 3:26 |
| 14. | "No te reprimas" | E. Diaz, A. Monroy, C. Villa | A Todo Rock (1983) | 3:01 |
| 15. | "Si tú no estás" | E. Diaz, A. Monroy, C. Villa | A Todo Rock (1983) | 4:28 |
| 16. | "Chicle de amor" | A. Monroy, C. Villa | A Todo Rock (1983) | 2:43 |
| 17. | "Sabes a chocolate" | A. Monroy, C. Villa | Evolución (1984) | 4:14 |
| 18. | "La fiesta va a empezar" | A. Monroy, C. Villa | Ayer y Hoy (1985) | 4:19 |
| 19. | "En San Juan me enamoré" | A. Monroy, Julio Seijas Cabezuelo, C. Villa | Ayer y Hoy (1985) | 2:50 |
| 20. | "Hold me" | Howe Rice | Menudo (1985) | 4:15 |

DVD La historia
| No. | Title | Writer(s) | Length |
|---|---|---|---|
| 1. | "No te reprimas" | Alejandro Monroy Fernández |
| 2. | "Si tú no estás" | Alejandro Monroy Fernández |
| 3. | "Claridad" | M. Fabrizio, Dario Villa De La Torre |
| 4. | "Piel de manzana" | Alejandro Monroy Fernández |
| 5. | "Chicle de amor" | Desmond Forrest, Mike Brassard |
| 6. | "Mi banda toca rock" | Alejandro Monroy Fernández |
| 7. | "Súbete a mi moto" | I.M. Brown, S.H. Dorn |
| 8. | "Like a cannonball" | I.M. Brown, S.H. Dorn |
| 9. | "Sabes a chocolate" | Alejandro Monroy Fernández |
| 10. | "En San Juan me enamoré" | Alejandro Monroy Fernández, Dario Villa De La Torre |
| 11. | "Please be good to me" | Alejandro Monroy Fernández, M. Pagan, Dario Villa De La Torre |
| 12. | "Agua de limón" | Alejandro Monroy Fernández |

== Charts ==
Weekly charts for La Historia
| Chart (2007) | Peak position |
|---|---|
| US Billboard 200 | 190 |
| US Top Latin Albums (Billboard) | 10 |
| US Latin Pop Albums (Billboard) | 4 |
| Mexico (AMPROFON) | 16 |
