= The Best of Menudo =

Compilation album by Menudo
- Released: 1986
- Recorded: 1984–1986
- Studio: OctoArts International
- Genre: Pop

Menudo chronology
Can't Get Enough (1986)	The Best of Menudo (1986)	Somos Los Hijos del Rock (1987)

The Best of Menudo is a compilation album by the Puerto Rican boy band Menudo, released in 1986 in the Philippines by the record label OctoArts International. This work marks the second release featuring the lineup consisting of Charlie Massó, Roby Rosa, Ricky Martin, Raymond Acevedo, and Sergio Gonzalez.

The tracklist includes one previously unreleased song and eleven other tracks that were previously featured on Menudo's albums. From the album Reaching Out (1984), the tracks "Like a Cannonball", "If You're Not Here (By My Side)", "Because of Love", "Gotta Get On Moving", and "Heavenly Angel" are included. From Menudo (1985), the tracks "Hold Me", "You and Me All the Way", "Explosion", "Please Be Good To Me", and "Don't Hold Back" are included. "Acércate" is the only song in Spanish, originally part of the album Ayer y hoy (1985).

The album was well received by both audiences and critics, earning a gold certification in the Philippines.

== Background and context ==
By 1985, the group Menudo was already one of the most well-known musical acts in Latin America. However, they were still relatively unknown in the Philippines. The record label RCA Records, which had been investing in expanding their career beyond the Americas, decided to promote them in the Asian country. When the group was announced there, they were initially met with ridicule, as the term "menudo" was known locally as a Spanish dish. Nevertheless, it didn't take long for the so-called "Menudomania" to take hold in the Philippines, especially after Charlie performed "Di Na Natuto" in Tagalog, the national indigenous dialect, a gesture that earned the group the respect of even the most skeptical critics. The record label was preparing to release a compilation of hits and lesser-known tracks to capitalize on this positive reception.

== Single ==
After Charlie's departure, the Filipino audience felt so outraged that Edgardo Díaz, the group's creator and manager, had Menudo record a special song for the country titled "I'm Going Back to the Philippines." This song is an English version of the group's earlier hit, "Hoy Me Voy Para México," from the album Refrescante... (1986). Fans of the group draw comparisons between this track and "Manila," a 1976 song by the Filipino band The Hotdogs, as both express love for the country and the narrator's desire to return to their homeland. The single released in the Philippines for this track features an instrumental version of the song as its B-side.

Menudo also recorded a Portuguese version of the song, titled "Hoje a Noite Não Tem Luar", which appeared on the Brazilian edition of Refrescante... (retitled Menudo), and was later covered by the Brazilian rock group Legião Urbana in their album Acústico MTV, released in 1999. According to one of the group's members, Dado Villa-Lobos, the vocalist Renato Russo was a fan of Menudo and followed the Puerto Rican group's tour in Rio de Janeiro.

== Promotion ==
At the time of the album's release, the quintet filmed a series of exclusive commercials for the Philippines promoting the soft drink brand Pepsi. The company played a significant role in promoting Menudo in the country, even featuring its logo on the back cover of The Best of Menudo. Pepsi also sponsored the highly successful tour that took place in various Filipino cities. During this period, following an invitation from the daughter of the country's president, Corazón Aquino, Menudo performed a series of shows at the Arena Coliseum in Manila. These shows attracted approximately 75,000 attendees.

== Critical reception ==
Regarding reviews from music critics, the editors from AllMusic rated the album four out of five stars. However, no written commentary about the album was provided.

== Commercial performance ==
Commercially, the album was a success. While performing on the Filipino television show GMA Supershow, where they sang the track "Summer In The Streets" from the album Can't Get Enough, the artists were awarded a gold record by a representative of OctoArts International. During the event, the singers expressed their gratitude for the award. Ricky Martin highlighted that it was the third gold record he had received during his career with Menudo, while Sergio Gonzalez noted that it was his first award.

In 1986, as reported by Ramón L. Acevedo, Raymond Acevedo's father, in the biography “¡Papi, Quiero Ser Un Menudo!”, some members of the group created a list to present to Edgardo Díaz, the group's founder and manager. The list included requests for higher salaries, rest hours after shows (as they were working 13 consecutive hours without breaks, not even for meals), and the payment of overdue debts related to commercials and albums like The Best of Menudo. According to Acevedo, although the group was awarded a gold record for the album, they received no financial compensation for it.

== Track listing ==
No.	Title	Writer(s)	Performer	Length
1.	"I'm Going Back To The Philippines"	C. Villa, A. Monroy, M. L. Pagán	Raymond Acevedo
2.	"If You're Not Here (By My Side)"	Díaz, Monroy, Pagan, Villa	Robby Rosa
3.	"Explosion"	M. L. Pagán	Robby Rosa
4.	"Because Of Love"	Pagan, Villa, Julio Seijas, Eddy Guerin	Robby Rosa
5.	"Gotta Get On Movin'"	Monroy, Pagan, Villa	Ricky Meléndez
6.	"Heavenly Angel"	Monroy, Villa, Mary Lynne M Pagan	Charlie Massó
7.	"Hold Me"	H. Rice	Robby Rosa
8.	"Like a Cannonball"	Snuff Garrett, Steve Dorff, Milton Brown	Robby Rosa
9.	"You And Me All The Way"	H. Rice, A. Rich	Raymond Acevedo
10.	"Please Be Good To Me"	C. Villa, A. Monroy, M. L. Pagán	Robby Rosa
11.	"Don't Hold Back"	H. Rice, A. Rich	Robby Rosa
12.	"Acercate"	A. Monroy, C. Villa	Charlie Massó

== Certifications ==
Region	Certification
Philippines	Gold
