= Os Últimos Heróis =

Studio album by Menudo
- Released: 1990
- Genre: Pop rock
- Language: Brazilian Portuguese
- Label: RCA Victor

Menudo chronology
La Colección (1990)	Os Últimos Heróis (1990)	No Me Corten El Pelo (1990)

Os Últimos Heróis, released in some countries as Menudo: Colección Internacional — Edición Brasil, is the twenty-ninth studio album by the Puerto Rican boy band Menudo, released in 1990 under the label RCA. This album is the fourth to feature songs in Portuguese. As mentioned by one of the members in an interview, the project: “is a Portuguese-language album made with great care, compiling the group’s hits with 10 songs from their last four albums”.

At the time, the group consisted of members Sergio Gonzalez, Rubén Gómez, Robert Avellanet, Rawy Torres, and new member César Abreu, who replaced Angelo García. César left the group shortly after, making way for Adrián Olivares, who traveled to Brazil to promote the album on TV shows.

== Production and recording ==
The production and recording of Menudo's album involved a diverse team. The musical arrangements were crafted by Willie Croes, Pedro Gely, and George and Michael Atwell. The production was handled by Beresford Finance and Trade, with artistic direction by Edgardo Díaz, the group's creator. The album was recorded at Audio America Studios in Orlando, Florida, and mixed at Telearte under the supervision of sound engineer Juan Carlos Socorro.

The production also included assistance from Luis Bascaran, photography by Jesús Gutiérrez, styling by José Luis Vega, graphic design by Yrene Soler, and hair and makeup by Vidal Hair.

== Album details ==
The track listing includes ten Portuguese versions (eleven on the LP reissue) adapted by Luciana Souza from songs originally recorded by Menudo in Spanish and English.These tracks come from four previous albums released between 1987 and 1989: Somos los hijos del rock (1987), Sons of Rock (1988), Sombras y figuras (1988), and Los últimos héroes (1989). None of these albums were released in Brazil, having been distributed by smaller local labels in Latin America after the group's contract with RCA Records ended.

From the 1987 album Somos los hijos del rock, the included songs are "Cuando seas grande" ("Quando For Grande"), "Mi sombra en la pared" ("Minha Sombra na Parede"), and "Estamos en acción" ("Estamos em Ação"). From the group's 1988 English-language album Sons of Rock, only the title track was adapted, becoming "Força do Rock". From Sombras y figuras (1988), the versions include "Niña Luna" ("Minha Lua, Minha Luz"), "Serenata Rock and Roll" ("Serenata Rock and Roll"), (Note: The song "Serenata Rock and Roll" only appears on the reissued version of the album, which contained eleven tracks instead of ten.) and "Dulces dieciséis" ("Doces dezesseis"). Finally, from the album Los Últimos Héroes (also 1988), the versions included are "Giro" ("Rodo, Giro"), "Ahora sé" ("Agora Eu Sei"), "Por primera vez" ("A Primeira Vez"), and the title track "Los últimos héroes" ("Os Últimos Heróis").

== Release and promotion ==
The album was released while the group was still promoting songs from Los últimos héroes during their 1990 tour, which visited several countries including Mexico, Venezuela, Dominican Republic, and Argentina. The second leg of the tour was scheduled for May of that year. On May 7, 1990, the newspaper La Opinión published an interview with the members, where César mentioned that although he hadn't participated in the album's recording, he was promoting it as if he had. In the same interview, the singer stated the quintet would begin recording a new album later that year.

Three years after their last visit to Brazil, the group returned to promote their new work on television shows. On September 29, 1990, the news program Jornal da Manchete announced their arrival in a report featuring an interview with the members. They discussed their musical style and wardrobe changes, now with a stronger rock influence. They also expressed hopes to sell at least 500,000 copies of the new LP in Brazil - half of what they typically sold during their peak in the country.

On SBT, the artists appeared on several programs hosted by Gugu Liberato. On Passa ou Repassa, Adrián lip-synced César's part in "Rodo Giro" since he had already left the group. On Corrida Maluca, they performed "Os Últimos Heróis". They made two appearances on Viva a Noite, performing "Os Últimos Heróis" on the first and "Quando for Grande" on the second. They also appeared on Qual É a Música?, where they were interviewed by Silvio Santos and performed both songs again. On Mariane, hosted by Mariane Dombrova, they performed "Os Últimos Heróis". On Show Maravilha, they sang "Quando for Grande".

On TV Globo, they performed on Domingão do Faustão, delivering a rock version of their classic "Não se Reprima" among other songs. They appeared twice on Xou da Xuxa, performing "Os Últimos Heróis" both times. During the second appearance, they explained to Xuxa that this visit was exclusively for TV promotions, but they would return in December for a concert tour.

Their appearance at TV Gazeta in São Paulo caused a commotion. Protesting students clashed with security, and some tore off and burned the band's bus banner, nearly causing a fire. At the station, they appeared on Mulheres, hosted by Ione Borges, performing both singles. On Record, they performed on Programa Paulo Barboza. On Band, they appeared on Almoço com Zaccaro and Clube do Bolinha, repeating their repertoire.

== Track listing ==
- Credits adapted from the 1990 LPs Os Últimos Heróis and Menudo: Colección Internacional — Edición Brasil.

All songs adapted to Portuguese by Luciana Souza.

=== First release (with César) ===
No.	Title	Writer(s)	Length
1.	"Quando For Grande"	Miguel Mateos	4:23
2.	"Minha Lua, Minha Luz"	Fernando Riba / Kiko Campos	3:52
3.	"Rodo, Giro"	Juan Carlos Perez Soto	4:37
4.	"Agora Eu Sei"	Fernando Osorio	3:11
5.	"Os Últimos Heróis"	Carlos Lara	3:19
6.	"Minha Sombra Na Parede"	Miguel Mateos	4:30
7.	"A Primeira Vez"	Fernando Osorio	3:10
8.	"Estamos Em Ação"	Fernando Martín Lupano / Norberto Topini / Patricia Sosa	3:27
9.	"Doces Dezesseis"	Miguel Mateos	3:48
10.	"A Força do Rock"	Marc Anthony	3:40
Total length:			33:22

=== Second release (with Adrián) ===
No.	Title	Writer(s)	Length
1.	"Quando For Grande"	Miguel Mateos	4:23
2.	"Minha Lua, Minha Luz"	Fernando Riba / Kiko Campos	3:52
3.	"Rodo, Giro"	Juan Carlos Perez Soto	4:37
4.	"Agora Eu Sei"	Fernando Osorio	3:11
5.	"Os Últimos Heróis"	Carlos Lara	3:19
6.	"Minha Sombra Na Parede"	Miguel Mateos	4:30
7.	"A Primeira Vez"	Fernando Osorio	3:10
8.	"Estamos Em Ação"	Fernando Martín Lupano / Norberto Topini / Patricia Sosa	3:27
9.	"Doces Dezesseis"	Miguel Mateos	3:48
10.	"A Força do Rock"	Marc Anthony	3:40
11.	"Serenata Rock And Roll"	Pedro Gely	3:17
Total length:			36:39
