= Viva! Bravo! =

Studio album by Menudo
- Released: 1986
- Studio: American Studios (Los Angeles), Estudios Kirios
- Genre: Pop
- Label: Globo
- Producer: Edgardo Diaz

Menudo chronology
Ayer Y Hoy (1985)	Viva! Bravo! (1986)	Refrescante (1986)

Viva! Bravo! (1986) is the twentieth studio album by the Puerto Rican boy band Menudo and the first to be recorded in Italian. Released in 1986 by Globo Records, it reflects the band's ongoing strategy of linguistic adaptation to reach audiences in different countries.

The lineup during this period included Charlie Massó, Robby Rosa, Ricky Martin, Raymond Acevedo, and the new member Sergio Gonzalez, who replaced Roy Rosselló. The tracklist features versions of songs originally recorded in Spanish and English from five previous albums: Por Amor (1982), A Todo Rock (1983), Evolución (1984), Menudo (1985), and Ayer y Hoy (1985).

== Background ==
In 1983, the group Menudo signed a six-year contract with RCA Records for the release of twelve albums, a deal worth several million dollars. Following the success of their first albums recorded in English and Portuguese, respectively titled Reaching Out (1984) and Mania (1984), the record label aimed to continue expanding its business beyond its southern border, including European countries such as Spain and Italy.

== Production and recording ==
On January 7, 1985, the newspaper La Opinión reported that the group planned to enter the studio and record songs in Italian during the first half of that year. The recordings took place at Estudios Kirios, owned by Discos CBS, in Madrid, Spain, and at the American Recording Co. studio in Hollywood, United States. The audio mixing was completed at Estudios Eurosonic in Madrid. The album was produced by Edgardo Díaz, the group's creator and manager, with assistance from Mary Lynne Pagán and Olimpio Petrossi. The graphic design (cover and back cover) was managed by Antonio Dojmi.

The album's title comes from the first track on Side A, "Viva! Bravo!", which shares its name with the versions in Spanish and Portuguese included in the albums Ayer y Hoy and A Festa Vai Começar, both released in 1986. These versions achieved success on radio, ranking among the top positions on the record charts in Latin countries such as Bolivia (La Paz) and Brazil (Rio de Janeiro).

== Repertoire ==
The tracklist includes versions of songs originally recorded in Spanish and English from previous albums. From the album Ayer y Hoy (1986), the tracks "Viva! Bravo!" ("Viva! Bravo!"), "Guardando Il Cielo Ed Un Gabbiano" ("Pañuelo Blanco Americano"), and "Vicino A Te" ("Acércate") were adapted. From Evolución (1984), the songs "Baci Al Cioccolato" ("Sabes a Chocolate"), "Il Primo Amore" ("Amor Primero"), and "Acqua Candida" ("Agua de Limón") were included. The album A Todo Rock (1983) contributed "Tu Come Stai (Senza Me)" ("Si tú no estás"), "Vivi La Vita" ("No te reprimas"), and "La Più Carina" ("Piel de manzana"). "Dolci Baci" is a version of "Dulces besos" from the album Por Amor (1982). Finally, from the album Menudo (1985), the tracks "Al Di Là Che Cosa C'è" ("You And Me All The Way") and "Sogni" ("Hold Me") were translated.

== Promotion ==
As part of their promotional efforts, the group traveled to Italy on February 12, 1986, to perform at the thirty-sixth edition of the Sanremo Music Festival (36º Festival della canzone italiana), where they performed the songs "Baci al cioccolato" and "Viva! Bravo!". The RCA label included "Baci al cioccolato" in the compilation album Speciale Sanremo '86, which reached the sixth position on the Italian music chart.

During this time, an incident was reported by Ramón L. Acevedo in his biography, “¡Papi, Quiero Ser Un Menudo!”. The author revealed internal tensions in Menudo following accusations of sexual abuse against Edgardo Díaz, the group's manager, made by Ricky Martin and another member. After inappropriate physical contact with the boys, Ricky fled in tears and sought help from Robby and Charlie, who confronted Edgardo, threatening and condemning his behavior. The disclosure led parents to question their children's contracts, while Edgardo attempted to manipulate members and isolate leaders like Robby. Further allegations of financial manipulation and harassment attempts escalated the conflict. Despite initial parental support, Edgardo retaliated by firing allies such as Edwin Fonseca, remaining relentless in his retribution against those who challenged his authority.

== Track listing ==
No.	Title	Writer(s)	Performer	Length
1.	"Viva! Bravo!"	A. Monroy, C. Villa, P. Cassella	Charlie Massó	3:24
2.	"Al Di La Che Cosa C'è"	A. Rich, H. Rice, L. Macchiarella	Raymond Acevedo	4:25
3.	"Baci Al Cioccolato"	A. Monroy, C. Villa, L. Gane	Robby Rosa	4:12
4.	"Il Primo Amore"	A. Monroy, Azuela, C. Villa, L. Macchiarella	Charlie Massó	3:11
5.	"Dolci Baci"	A. Monroy, Azuela, C. Villa, J. Seijas, L. Macchiarella	Ricky Martin	3:35
6.	"Tu Come Stai (Senza me)"	A. Monroy, C. Villa, P. Cassella	Robby Rosa	4:26
7.	"Guardando Il Cielo Ed Un Gabbiano"	A. Monroy, C. Villa, P. Cassella	Raymond Acevedo	3:42
8.	"Vivi La Vita"	A. Monroy, Azuela, C. Villa, E. Diaz, V. Caldari	Charlie Massó	2:59
9.	"Sogni"	H. Rice, P. Cassella	Robby Rosa	4:11
10.	"Acqua Candida"	A. Monroy, Azuela, C. Villa	Raymond Acevedo	4:17
11.	"Vicino A Te"	A. Monroy, Azuela, C. Villa	Charlie Massó	3:59
12.	"La Più Carina"	A. Monroy, C. Villa, L. Macchiarella	Sergio Gonzalez	3:34
