= De Colección (Menudo album) =

- Cover of the 1983 and digital editions.

Compilation album by Menudo
- Released: 1982
- Recorded: 1977–1981
- Genre: Pop
- Label: Padosa

Menudo chronology
Quiero Ser (1981)	De Colección (1982)	Por Amor (1982)

De Colección is a compilation album by Puerto Rican boy band Menudo, released in 1982. The album includes songs that previously appeared on other albums by the quintet, released between 1977 and 1981, namely: Los fantasmas (1977), Laura (1978), Chiquitita (1979), Más, mucho más... (1980), Quiero ser and Xanadu, both from 1981. By this time, the group had already received two gold records in the United States, as well as one silver, four gold, and three platinum records in Latin America.

== Release and context ==
The initial release was limited to certain countries, such as Venezuela, and the following year it was reissued with new cover art. During this period, the group was in the media spotlight due to Miguel's departure, which the record label Padosa treated as an excellent marketing opportunity, resulting in a special album, Adiós Miguel, as a tribute to the former member. In this context, the label simultaneously released three other Menudo records: Feliz Navidad, De colección (reissue), and A todo rock. That year, Menudo sold 750,000 copies of their albums in just three days.

== Commercial performance ==
Commercially, De colección performed well in the United States and the group's home country, Puerto Rico, where it appeared on local music charts, as audited and reported by Billboard magazine.

== Track listing ==
- Credits adapted from the 1982 LP De Colección.

No.	Title	Writer(s)	Original Album	Length
1.	"No se puede parar la musica"	Beauris Whitehead, H. Belolo, Jacques Morali, Phil Hortt	Xanadu	2:58
2.	"Enseñame a cantar"	Fernando Arbex	Los Fantasmas	3:37
3.	"Soy natural"	Edgardo Diaz	Chiquitita	2:50
4.	"Ella a a"	H. Herrero, J. Seijas, G. Escolar	Chiquitita	5:02
5.	"Dos niños"	John Farrel	Los Fantasmas	3:04
6.	"Voulez-vous"	B. Andersson, B. Ulvaeus, Díaz	Chiquitita	3:43
7.	"Me voy a enamoriscar"	Juan Pardo	Quiero Ser	3:06
8.	"Chiquitita"	B. Andersson, B. Ulvaeus	Chiquitita	5:06
9.	"Cosita loca llamada amor"	Freddie Mercury	Xanadu	2:29
10.	"Libre mi corazon"	Leyda E. Colón	Laura	2:35
11.	"Voy a américa"	C. Villa, E. Guerín, J. Seijas	Xanadu	3:01
12.	"Quiero verte feliz"	Carlos F. Prida	Los Fantasmas	2:52
13.	"Los fantasmas"	Honorio Herrero	Los Fantasmas	3:03
14.	"Más mucho más"	C. Villa, E. Guerín, J. Seijas	Más, Mucho Más...	3:24

== Charts ==
Weekly charts for De Colección
Chart (1983)	Peak position
US (Billboard Top Latin Albums – California)	2
US (Billboard Top Latin Albums – New York)	2
US (Billboard Top Latin Albums – Texas)	1
Puerto Rico (Billboard Top LPs)	11
