= La Colección (Menudo album) =

Compilation album by Menudo
- Released: 1990
- Recorded: 1987–1988
- Genre: Pop, pop rock
- Label: Melody

Menudo chronology
| Los últimos héroes (1989) | La Colección (1990) | Os Últimos Heróis (1990) |

La colección is a compilation album by Puerto Rican boy band Menudo, released in April 1990 by the record label Melody. The album was released exclusively in Mexico in LP, cassette, and CD formats. It features songs taken from the albums Somos los hijos del Rock (1987) and Sombras y figuras (1988)., but its cover displays the 1990 lineup of the group, consisting of Sergio Blass, Rubén Gómez, Robert Avellanet, Rawy Torres, and César Abreu.

The compilation includes twelve tracks, evenly split between the two source albums, and features four singles that had previously reached the Top 10 on the Mexican Notitas Musicales chart. The album was a major commercial success in Mexico, reportedly selling over two million copies. This strong performance prompted the release of a second compilation, La década, later the same year.

== Album details ==
The album was released exclusively in Mexico in LP, cassette, and CD formats. Although the songs are taken from albums released in 1987 and 1988, featuring a different lineup, the album cover displays the members at the time of its release: Sergio Blass, Rubén Gómez, Robert Avellanet, Rawy Torres, and César Abreu.

The compilation consists entirely of songs originally from the albums Somos los hijos del Rock (1987) and Sombras y figuras (1988). The six songs from the first album are: "Ámame ahora, no mañana," "Cuando sea grande," "Mi sombra en la pared (Bailo con mi sombra)," "Estamos en acción," "Llámame," and "Dame más." Meanwhile, the remaining six tracks—"Dulces dieciséis," "En mis sueños," "Serenata Rock'n Roll," "Escapando de ti," "Gafas oscuras," and "Historia del primer amor"—are from the 1988 album Sombras y figuras.

The tracklist includes four singles that reached the Top 10 on the biweekly music chart of the Mexican magazine Notitas Musicales, becoming some of Menudo's biggest hits in the country. "Bailo con mi sombra" peaked at No. 9 in the second half of February 1988. "Estamos en acción" also reached No. 9, in the first half of June of the same year. "Gafas oscuras" performed even better, peaking at No. 4 in the first half of June 1989. "Serenata Rock and Roll" was the most successful of the four, reaching No. 3 in the second half of September 1989.

== Commercial performance ==
According to Kathleen Tracy, author of the Ricky Martin biography Red Hot and on the Rise!, the album sold over 2 million copies in Mexico. This prompted the group's manager, Edgardo Díaz, to release a second compilation later that year, titled La década.

== Track listing ==
| No. | Title | Writer(s) | Lead vocalist | Length |
|---|---|---|---|---|
| 1. | "Dulces dieciséis" | Miguel Mateos | Rubén Gómez | 3:50 |
| 2. | "En mis sueños" | William Luke | Angelo García | 3:26 |
| 3. | "Serenata Rock'n Roll" | Pedro Gely | Robert Avellanet | 3:29 |
| 4. | "Escapando de ti" | Carlos Gaviola | Angelo García | 3:45 |
| 5. | "Ámame ahora, no mañana" | Miguel Mateos | Ricky Martin | 3:28 |
| 6. | "Cuando sea grande" | Miguel Mateos | Ralphy Rodríguez | 4:31 |
| 7. | "Gafas oscuras" | Pedro Gely | Ricky Martin | 3:55 |
| 8. | "Historia del primer amor" | Lara, Monarrez | Robert Avellanet | 3:36 |
| 9. | "Mi sombra en la pared (Bailo con mi sombra)" | Miguel Mateos | Sergio Blass | 4:43 |
| 10. | "Estamos en acción" | Sosa, Lupano, Topini | Rubén Gómez | 3:28 |
| 11. | "Llámame" | Miguel Mateos | Sergio Blass | 3:19 |
| 12. | "Dame más" | Pedro Gely | Ricky Martin | 3:49 |
