= Sons of Rock =

Sons Of Rock

Studio album by Menudo
- Released: 1988
- Studio: Audio American Studios
- Genre: Latin pop
- Length: 36:35
- Label: Blue Dog Records
- Producer: Papo Gely

Menudo chronology
In Action (1987)	Sons Of Rock (1988)	Sombras Y Figuras (1988)

Sons of Rock is the twenty-sixth studio album (and fifth in English) by the Puerto Rican boy band Menudo, released in 1988 by Blue Dog Records. This album marks the first time the group released entirely original songs in English; previous English albums had only contained translated versions of songs from their Spanish albums.

It featured Ricky Martin, Raymond Acevedo, Sergio Gonzalez, Rubén Gómez and new member Angelo García. Angelo replaced Ralphy Rodríguez, after just one year of tenure, Rodríguez's parents pulled him off the band citing cruel treatment by management.

== Members and title ==
During this period, the group consisted of the following members: Ricky Martin, Raymond Acevedo, Sergio Blass, Rubén Gómez, and the new member Angelo García. At the beginning of 1988, the group appeared on television shows and performed live as a quartet, as Ralphy Rodríguez left the group after reaching the age limit of 16.

This is the first English album the band recorded of all new material, without any previous Spanish songs translated into English.

The album has a similar name to the 1987 album Somos Los Hijos del Rock, although the only connection between the two is the more rock-inspired visual and musical style. This release continued Menudo's aesthetic and musical transformation, which began in 1987 after the underperformance of previous albums. During this time, the group also released an album in the Philippines titled In Action, featuring English and Tagalog versions of songs from Somos Los Hijos del Rock and other recordings.

In late 1988/early 1989, Sons Of Rock was re-released with a new album cover. This time it featured a neon magenta color, as well as a new picture of the group and current line-up: Ricky Martin, Sergio Blass, Rubén Gómez, Angelo García and new member Robert Avellanet replacing Raymond Acevedo.

== Single ==
"You Got Potential," the sixth track, was released as a single. It achieved radio success, and according to Ricky Martin, "The success led us to a 40-show tour in the United States. It was an exciting phase because we managed to reinvent ourselves to reach our fans with a different type of music."

== Promotion ==
The group embarked on a tour to promote the album, which included performances in Mexico, where they were welcomed by a substantial number of fans at the airport. The show’s set list included Menudo hits along with several songs from *Sons of Rock*. One of the performances was broadcast by the television channel KMEX-TV in October 1988. The recordings were made live at the American theme park Knott's Berry Farm.

== Track listing ==
No.	Title	Writer(s)	Lead vocalist	Length
1.	"Sons of Rock"	Marc Anthony	Sergio Gonzalez
2.	"Good Lovin'"	A. Resnick, R. Clark	Ruben Gomez
3.	"TLC"	Lynsey de Paul, Terry Britten	Ricky Martin
4.	"Miss You 'Til Tomorrow"	Papo Gely	Raymond Acevedo
5.	"Say Why"	Papo Gely	Ricky Martin
6.	"You Got Potential"	A. R. Scott, M. Jay	Angelo Garcia
7.	"Nights on Fire"	Peter S. Bliss	Ruben Gomez
8.	"999"	D. Danielson, P. Deremer	Raymond Acevedo
9.	"To Leave Once More"	M. Anthony, P. Gely	Angelo Garcia
10.	"I Will"	Papo Gely	Sergio Gonzalez
