= Party En California =

EP by Menudo
- Released: June 28, 2024
- Genre: Pop
- Language: Spanish, English
- Label: Mistar Entertainment, LLC

Menudo chronology
| Un Nuevo Comienzo (A New Beginning) (2023) | Party En California (2024) |

Party En California is an extended play by the boy band Menudo, released on October 20, 2023, by the record label Mistar Entertainment, LLC. The lineup included members Alejandro, Andres, Ezra, Gabriel, and Nicolas. The singers promoted the EP on TV shows. The release was celebrated with an event at the Hard Rock Cafe in Miami, where they announced a concert for July 21.

The first single released was "Party En California," produced by Saga WhiteBlack. Another highlight was "Brownie Sugar (Remix)," a collaboration with Ely Blancarte, marking a shift toward a more urban sound.

Commercially, the work achieved success on music charts in the Philippines and South Africa.

== Promotion ==
To promote the album, the group performed on TV shows. On July 2, 2024, they surprised the audience with an appearance on America's Got Talent. During their performance, the five members sang their original song "Amnesia," but were interrupted by Simon Cowell, who asked for another track. In response, the group performed "Feelin'" securing a spot in the next round of the competition and earning praise from the judges and audience.

To celebrate the release, the quintet held a special event at the Hard Rock Cafe in Miami, where they announced their next concert at the venue, scheduled for July 21, 2024.

== Singles ==
The song "Party En California," released as a single, features an upbeat, danceable sound and was produced by Saga WhiteBlack, an acclaimed producer who has won multiple Latin music categories at the Billboard Music Awards and is known for his work with various Latin artists, including Colombian singer Shakira. The track peaked at number 67 on the iTunes charts in South Africa.

"Brownie Sugar (Remix)" was released as a single and features a collaboration with Mexican singer and influencer Ely Blancarte, who expressed excitement about the partnership. According to the group, the song’s lyrics "are about seeing a girl we’ve liked for a long time and waiting for the right moment to talk to her. We call her our 'Brownie Sugar' as a sweet nickname." The release marked a shift toward a more urban and mature sound compared to the group’s previous work. Regarding the music video, the group revealed in an interview that it was filmed at a house with a pool and wrapped up around 2 a.m. Despite the late hours, Gabriel described the experience as rewarding, as they made new friends. Shortly after, the group held a live session with fans to discuss the video and hear their feedback—something they had been doing since the formation of this lineup.

== Commercial performance ==
The EP charted in the Philippines and South Africa.

== Track listing ==
| No. | Title | Writer(s) | Length |
|---|---|---|---|
| 1. | "Party En California" | Cristhian Camilo Mena Moreno, Hector Ricardo Corrales, José Francisco Gabriel Dugarte Arguinzones, José Miguel Arcángel Dugarte Arguinzones | 3:02 |
| 2. | "Amnesia" | Jorge Franco, Orlando Vitto, Renzo Bravo | 3:31 |
| 3. | "Feelin'" | Andy Clay, Carlos Humberto Dominguez Kemzo, Luis Salazar, Yoel Henríquez | 2:41 |
| 4. | "Brownie Sugar" | Andrés Gómez Gonzales, Cristhian Camilo Mena Moreno, Cristian Serna, Mateo Mejia Galeano, Santiago Mejía | 2:57 |
| 5. | "Brownie Sugar - Remix" (English version) | Andrés Gómez Gonzales, Cristhian Camilo Mena Moreno, Cristian Serna, Mateo Mejia Galeano, Santiago Mejía | 3:16 |
