= Trip (magazine) =

Brazilian magazine

- Editor-in-Chief: Paulo Lima
- Categories: Global Destination, Luxury Travel, Budget/Backpacking, Eco-Tourism/Outdoor, Culinary/Wellness
- Frequency: Monthly
- Circulation: 30,000
- Publisher: Paulo Lima
- Founder: Paulo Lima; Carlos Sarli
- Founded: May 7, 1986
- Country: Brazil
- Language: Portuguese
- Website: Trip
- ISSN: 1414-350X

Trip is a Brazilian magazine first published in 1986. Founded by Paulo Lima and Carlos Sarli, the magazine originated from the radio program Trip 89. Initially a publication dedicated to surfing, it became known for addressing topics such as politics, sex and culture, with reports, interviews (Páginas Negras or Black Pages) and photo essay (Trip Girls).

With a bold graphic and editorial project, Trip was awarded inside and outside the country (including three medals from the New York Art Directors Club, and four times finalist for the Esso Award). Currently, the magazine has a circulation of 30,000 monthly copies, with 6,000 subscribers and 3,000 VIP's readers who receive the magazine for free (journalists, personalities, entrepreneurs and collaborators of the publisher). In 2013, the magazine had a circulation of 45,000 copies.

Since 2007, the magazine has organized the Trip Transformadores award, aimed at honoring people "who have been transformed helping to improve the reality in which they live".
