= El Reencuentro: 15 Años Después =

Live album by El Reencuentro/Menudo
- Released: 1998
- Recorded: January 30, 31, February 1, 1998
- Venue: Coliseo Roberto Clemente
- Genre: Latin Pop
- Length: 1:30:47
- Label: Fonovisa Records, NTJ Productions (digital release)
- Producer: Ray Reyes

El Reencuentro/Menudo chronology
Tiempo de Amar (1996)	El Reencuentro: 15 Años Después (1998)	15 Años de Historia (1998)

El reencuentro: 15 años después... is the first live album released by the Puerto Rican boy band Menudo under the Fonovisa Records label. The album was recorded in 1998, during a series of performances held at the Coliseo Roberto Clemente in San Juan, Puerto Rico.

The project brings together six former members of the group who were part of its most notable lineups in the 1980s. Comprising 22 tracks, the album features live recordings of songs that marked Menudo's career. Its release solidified the project as an important milestone for fans, revisiting part of the repertoire that contributed to the group's international recognition.

Additionally, the album's production sought to balance elements of the original musical aesthetic with updated technical resources, offering a contemporary interpretation of Menudo's classic material.

== Background ==
The El Reencuentro project emerged in the late 1990s, bringing together six former members of Menudo, a Latin American musical phenomenon of the 1980s. In 1997, Ray Reyes, Ricky Meléndez, Johnny Lozada, and René Farrait participated in a radio show in Puerto Rico. Radio hosts Santiago Alegría and Gerardo Ortiz, inspired by an idea from Ray Reyes, decided to produce a special segment for the program titled Estrellas en Concierto, celebrating Menudo's 20th anniversary. During the broadcast, Ray and Ricky Meléndez shared their experiences with the group that catapulted them to fame.

The show was well received, leading them to plan a "second program." This time, Ray and Ricky were joined by two other former Menudo members, Johnny Lozada and René Farrait. The positive response led to the organization of an initial live performance at the Coliseo Roberto Clemente. During the shows, the former members brought an approach that combined the nostalgia of the original songs and choreography with technological and visual updates.

The reunion was initially planned as a one-time event but expanded due to high demand, turning into a series of performances that crossed borders and connected different generations of fans.

== Production and recording ==
The project's production was carried out collaboratively, with the members of El Reencuentro involved in various stages, including direction and the creative process of the performances. During the shows on January 30 and 31 and February 1, 1998, at the Coliseo Roberto Clemente, the live album was recorded, featuring a repertoire that blended Menudo's greatest hits with modern arrangements.

The double album was released in the same year as the recording and included 22 live songs, such as "Súbete a mi moto" and "Clara". Later, a second complementary album was released, featuring remixed and acoustic versions of other tracks by the group, diversifying the material available for fans.

The album was digitally released in the mid-2010s when the band secured distribution rights and made it available under the NTJ Productions label. The digital version includes a bonus track, "El Ayer", a remake of a 1970s Menudo song, produced by Ignacio Peña, Tony Rijos, and Ray Reyes.

== Singles ==
The songs "Claridad" and "Dulces Besos" reached positions 8 and 14, respectively, on the Latin Tropical/Salsa Airplay chart of Billboard magazine.

Following the album's release, the group released a maxi single with additional tracks complementing the first album. This CD included "Remix Acústico" versions of four songs ("Chiquitita," "Lady," "Acércate," and "Señora Mía"), as well as "Remix Bailable" versions of six songs ("Los Fantasmas," "A bailar," "Más mucho más," "Ella a-a," "Fuego," and "Me voy a enamoriscar") that were part of the live performance setlist. Additionally, it featured four remix versions of the track "Claridad".

== Critical reception ==
Professional ratings
Review scores
Source	Rating
AllMusic	4/5 stars

Stephen Thomas Erlewine of AllMusic rated the album four out of five stars and highlighted that Menudo's reunion was successful, as the group had matured. According to him, instead of relying on the youthful pop of their early albums, the record features dance-pop, adult contemporary ballads, and Latin pop, reflecting the growth of the members. Erlewine describes the album as "entertaining," successful, and possibly the band's best work to date.

== Awards and nominations ==
At the Billboard Latin Music Awards in 1999, the group won in the category of "Album of the Year, Duo or Group," competing against Entrega Total by Onda Vaselina, Ana José Nacho by Mecano, and Vento a Favor by Sentidos Opuestos.

In the category of "Album of the Year, New Artist," it competed against Entrega Total by Onda Vaselina, Vida Loca by Francisco Céspedes, and the winner Carlos Ponce by the self-titled artist Carlos Ponce.

== Commercial performance ==
The commercial impact of El Reencuentro: 15 Años Después was significant. The live album reached number seven on the Billboard Top Latin Albums chart, peaked at number four on the Latin Pop Albums chart, and debuted at number 31 on the Top Heatseekers ranking.

With an initial press run of 50,000 copies in Puerto Rico and 20,000 in Mexico, the album quickly gained traction, selling 200,000 copies in the latter country, earning it double gold certification in Mexico. Global sales have surpassed 800,000 copies.

== Track listing ==
El Reencuentro: 15 Años Después track listing
No.	Title	Writer(s)	Producer(s)	Length
1.	"Intro"		Ray Reyes	0:54
2.	"A Volar"	Alejandro Monroy; Carlos Villa; Edgardo Díaz	Reyes	3:54
3.	"Claridad"	Umberto Tozzi	Reyes	3:29
4.	"Lluvia"	Monroy; Villa; Díaz	Reyes	3:29
5.	"Susana"	Luis G. Escobar	Reyes	4:00
6.	"Voy América"	Julio Seijas	Reyes	3:17
7.	"Dulces Besos"	Seijas; Villa	Reyes	4:54
8.	"Tu Te Imaginas"	Monroy; Villa; Díaz; Miguel Cancel	Reyes	3:16
9.	"La Chispa De La Vida"	Monroy	Reyes	3:13
10.	"Y Yo No Bailo"	Seijas; Monroy	Reyes	3:23
11.	"Clara"	Monroy; Villa	Reyes	6:43
12.	"Quiero Ser"	Díaz; Pepe Luis Soto	Reyes	3:54
13.	"Cuando Pasará"	Seijas; Monroy	Reyes	6:11
14.	"Zumbador"	Villa; Monroy	Reyes	3:22
15.	"Rock En La TV"	Villa; Díaz	Reyes	3:03
16.	"No Te Reprimas"	Villa; Díaz; Monroy	Reyes	3:44
17.	"Por Amor"	Seijas; J.M. Gracia; Villa	Reyes	4:18
18.	"Si Tú No Estás"	Villa; Díaz; Monroy	Reyes	6:07
19.	"Quiero Rock"	Seijas; Monroy; Villa	Reyes	3:05
20.	"Cámbiale Las Pilas"	Monroy; Villa	Reyes	3:54
21.	"Mi Banda Toca Rock"	Ivano Fossati	Reyes	5:55
22.	"Subete A Mi Moto"	Díaz; Villa	Reyes	5:52
Total length:				01:30:47

El Reencuentro: 15 Años Live — digital release (Track 01 is "A Volar" replacing "Intro")
No.	Title	Writer(s)	Producer(s)	Length
22.	"El Ayer"	Socorro Centeno	Ignacio Peña, Tony Rijos, Ray Reyes	4:21

== Personnel ==
Supporting band members

- Amaury Lopez (Keyboards & Music Director)
- Ramon Sánchez (Keyboards)
- Sammy Fisher (Keyboards & Programming)
- Jorge Laboy (Guitars)
- Carlos Rolon (Guitars)
- Ito Serrano (Additional Guitars)
- Ricky Encarnacion (Bass)
- José "Pepe" Jiménez (Drums)
- Eliud Velásquez (Percussion)
- Gustavo Lopez (Trumpet)
- Orlando Zayas (Trumpet)
- Javier Martinez (Trombone)
- Jorge Diaz (Trombone)
- Reinaldo Castellano (Sax)
- Raul Reyes (Chorus)
- Pedro Veaz (Chorus)
- Ricardo Garcia (Chorus)
- Gustavo Parrilla (Chorus)

== Charts ==
Music Chart (1998)	Peak Position
United States (Billboard Top Latin Albums)	7
United States (Billboard Latin Pop Albums)	4
United States (Billboard Top Heatseekers)	31

== Certifications and sales ==
Region	Certification	Sales
Mexico (AMPROFON)	2× Gold	200,000*
Puerto Rico	Gold	50,000
Summaries
Worldwide	—	800,000+
