= Un Nuevo Comienzo (A New Beginning) =

EP by Menudo
- Released: October 20, 2023
- Genres: Ballad and Pop
- Languages: Spanish, English
- Labels: Mistar Entertainment, LLC

Menudo chronology
More than Words (2007)	Un Nuevo Comienzo (A New Beginning) (2023)	Party En California (2024)

Un Nuevo Comienzo (A New Beginning) is an extended play by the boy band Menudo, released on October 20, 2023, by the record label Mistar Entertainment, LLC. The lineup at the time included members Nicolas Calero, Gabriel Rossell, Andres Emilio, Alejandro Querales, and Ezra Gilmore, all of whom are of Latino descent.

The tracklist consists of seven songs. Among them, "Mi amore," "Feelin'" and "Tú y yo" were released as singles. The last one, as well as "Connection," also has an English version. The album closes with a Spanish duet version of "Mi Amore," performed with F.A.S.T and DJ Triple X.

== Promotion ==
To promote this new project, the group embarked on a tour across the U.S. that included shows in five cities. The concerts began on July 7, 2024, in Boston, Massachusetts, and concluded on August 10 of the same year in Los Angeles, California.

The group made appearances on TV shows and specials, including the Kids' Choice Awards, where they presented a nomination, and the iHeartRadio Fiesta Latina, where they performed some of their songs. The group also launched a series called "Momentos Menudo" on their YouTube channel, where they share fun facts about each band member.

== Singles ==
Three singles were released. The first was the song "Mi Amore", announced on May 20, 2023, the same day the group's new members were revealed to the public. The search for new members began in August 2022, when Menudo Productions, alongside TV host Mario López, started holding virtual auditions for talents aged 12 to 16. The new members are artists with experience in acting, singing, and songwriting. To promote the new single, the group appeared on various TV shows and digital platforms. The music video features a classic American teen movie vibe, with a high school dance full of teenagers and romantic disappointments.

The track "Feelin'" was released as the second single. The song was written by Luis Salazar, Yoel Henríquez, Andy Clay, and Kemzo, and produced by the music production team VrB Tunes (Orlando Vitto and Renzo Bravo). According to Latinidade, the song "represents the evolution of the young artists while staying true to the signature sound that resonates with all ages". The music video, directed by Brian Bayerl, features Alejandro, Andrés, Gabriel, Ezra, and Nicolás showcasing their dance moves and highlighting their chemistry as a group. Commercially, the song debuted at No. 24 on Billboard’s Latin Pop Airplay chart and peaked at No. 23 the following week. It spent a total of three weeks on the chart. Additionally, it surpassed 10 million views on YouTube shortly after its release.

"Tú y Yo" was the third single, released alongside the EP. Produced by Alex J with contributions from Sebastián Yatra, the song’s lyrics tell the story of a young man in love, using sweet words and heartfelt verses to win over a girl. The music video, filmed in five locations—Mexico, Los Angeles, New York, Miami, and Puerto Rico—complements the romantic theme with visuals that capture its essence.

== Track listing ==
- Credits adapted from Spotify.

No.	Title	Writer(s)	Length
1.	"Tú y yo"	Alexander Campos, Alvarez Edmundo	3:53
2.	"Mi amore"	Warren Meyers, Jonas Zekkari, Jordan Fairie, Anjeanette Chirino	3:20
3.	"Feelin'"	Andy Clay, Yoel Henríquez, Luis Salazar, Carlos Humberto Dominguez Kemzo	2:42
4.	"Connection"	Scott Russel Stoddart, Andrew Love, Leroy Sanchez Bejarano	3:26
5.	"Tú y yo" (English version)	Alexander Campos, Alvarez Edmundo	3:53
6.	"Connection" (English version)	Scott Stoddart, Andrew Love	3:27
7.	"Mi amore (F.A.S.T x & DJ Triple XL Remix)" (Spanish version)	Warren Meyers, Jonas Zekkari, Jordan Fairie, Anjeanette Chirino	3:29
