= Robert Avellanet =

Puerto Rican singer

- Born: Roberto Alejandro Avellanet Negrón; June 30, 1975 (age 51); San Juan, Puerto Rico
- Occupations: Singer, songwriter, actor, producer
- Years active: 1988–present
- Spouses: Tamara Gallardo (m. 1998; div. 2002) María Fernanda Rodriguez (m. 2014)
- Children: 2
- Relatives: Chucho Avellanet

Roberto Alejandro Avellanet Negrón, known professionally as Robert Avellanet or Roba, is a Puerto Rican singer who was a member of Menudo from 1988 to 1991. His uncle is the famous Puerto Rican singer Chucho Avellanet.

== Biography ==
Avellanet was born in San Juan, Puerto Rico, where he became a teen idol across Latin America after being hired by Edgardo Diaz as a member of Menudo in 1988, alongside Ricky Martin. He joined the group during the era popularly known as Menudo's Rock era.

Avellanet's CD debut came when Menudo recorded Sombras & Figuras, title of an album that produced hits for the group. Then came Los Ultimos Heroes.

In 1991, Avellanet along with three other members of the group left the band due to "financial disputes" and "physical and verbal abuse" by Edgardo Diaz and his associates. According to Avellanet, he was only compensated $500 for a "concert with maybe seventeen thousand people". After leaving Menudo, Avellanet and ex-bandmate Rawy Torres formed a group named Euphoria during the early 1990s and recorded two albums; Euphoria and Toma Mi Corazón.

In 1994 Avellanet went to college at the University of Puerto Rico to study advertising. In 1996 tropical music producer and business executive, Ralph Mercado, signed Robert to record a salsa album under the RMM label with the distribution of Universal Music. The album Sentir (1999), produced by Isidro Infante, had success in several Latin American countries, and in New York and Puerto Rico. The album was promoted by its lead single, "Miente", a cover of Enrique Iglesias's song which became a top-ten hit on the Billboard Tropical Airplay chart.

Avellanet has been featured in several telenovelas, such as Quién Mato a Hector Lavoe, Cuatro XXXX and Descarados. In 2003 Avellanet and his former Menudo bandmates made a reunion tour, naming it Los Ultimos Heroes.

In 2009 Avellanet co-produced the pop rock album titled Jet Privado, featuring songs such as Jet Privado, Laberinto, No Te Arrepientas and Miserable. Jet Privado includes collaborations from Venezuelan producer and songwriter Frank Santofimio, Frank Santofimio, Andrés Saavedra and Juan Carlos Pérez Soto.

In 2011 Avellanet moved to Los Angeles, California to pursue a career in acting and throughout the next decade he worked in several TV series, films and commercials, and also released several music singles. In 2011, he was interviewed for the American documentary television series Behind the Music episode that featured Ricky Martin.

In 2014 he released his first album in English, Heart and Soul, 10 songs with influences of soul, jazz and pop rock. It was produced by Fernando Perdomo and co-produced by Robert himself. It features songs like When I Have You, Love Is A Journey and Shine Your Light.

During 2015, Avellanet joined fellow former Menudo members Miguel Cancel, Ray Reyes, Rene Farrait and Charlie Masso in a tour throughout Latin America and United States, once again using the name Menudo. Right after this, he also participated in the Menudomania Forever tour, where Menudo's 40th anniversary was celebrated by bringing together a large number of former members. They performed in Miami, Florida, and in several cities of Mexico.

In 2022, Avellanet's starred in the film Free Dead Or Alive. He also wrote and recorded the theme song Comenzar de Nuevo; which is dedicated to immigrants. Also in 2022 Avellanet founded Viva La Earth, a skin cream company that supports non-profit organizations, such as The Wayuu Taya Foundation. In the same year, Robert was part of the documentary Menudo: Forever Young, where he gave his testimony of his time in Menudo. It was directed by Ángel Manuel Soto, and premiered at the Tribeca Film Festival. Robert's music single The Dog Song (The Best of All) was released on February 14, 2023.

== Discography ==
=== With Menudo ===
- Sombras & Figuras (1988)
- Los Ultimos Heroes (1989)
- Os Ultimos Herois (1990)
- No Me Corten El Pelo (1990)

=== With Euphoria ===
- Euphoria (1992)
- Toma Mi Corazón (1994)

=== Solo albums ===
- Sentir (1999)
- Jet Privado (as Roba)(2009)
- Jet Privado – Edición Especial (2014)
- Heart & Soul (2014)

=== Singles ===
- Cuando Tu Bailas (2017)
- Menudo – with Big Venti and DJ Calvin (2022)
- Comenzar de Nuevo – (from the soundtrack of Free Dead Or Alive) (2023)
- The Dog Song (The Best of All) (2023)

== See also ==
- List of Puerto Ricans
