= Fernando and Nefty Sallaberry =

Puerto Rican singers

Oscar Neftalí Sallaberry Valls (Nefty, born March 1, 1964, in Ponce, Puerto Rico) and Fernando Ramón Sallaberry Valls (born November 25, 1965, in Barcelona, Spain), are Puerto Rican (and Fernando also, Spaniard) singers and actors who were part of the original lineup of the band Menudo. Nefti and Fernando are the sons of Santiago Sallaberry, a doctor in oncology.

== Nefty ==
Nefty started with Menudo at age 13, and stayed in the group until he was 15. Nefty graduated in 1986 from Marquette University in Computer Sciences. He is an Information Technology Officer (ITO) in a company in Puerto Rico.

== Fernando ==
Fernando started in Menudo at age 12, and was one of the primary voices in the group until he left at age 15. He sang lead vocal on Chiquitita, which became one of Menudo's biggest hits. After he left the group, Fernando became popular as a soloist in Puerto Rico and in South America. He has Neuromuscular disease, a rare condition that has no cure. It is difficult for him to move, and he has needed his family's assistance for the last few years. He continues to gain strength and movement, but uses a wheelchair.

== XCHANGE ==
In 1987, four of the original five Menudo members, Carlos Melendez, Ricky Melendez, Nefty Sallaberry and Fernando Sallaberry reunited on a project they called: XCHANGE. There was some publicity, and they recorded a few demos (EPs), but were not offered a recording contract. They soon disbanded.

== In pop culture ==
Fernando and Nefty are played by Giuseppe Miguel Agrelot and by Fabricio Andres Broda Braida, respectively, in the 2020 Amazon Prime Video series based on Menudo, "Subete A Mi Moto".

== Discography ==
=== With Menudo (Nefty Sallaberry) ===
- Los Fantasmas (1977)
- Laura (1978)

=== With Menudo (Fernando Sallaberry) ===
- Los Fantasmas (1977)
- Laura (1978)
- Chiquitita (1979)
- Felicidades! (1979)
- Mas Mucho Mas (1980)

=== Without Menudo (Fernando Sallaberry) ===
- Menudo Presenta A Fernando (1982)
- Fantasia (1983)
- Los Idolos Juventiles 83-Fernando, Rene Farrait, Arturo Vazquez (1983)
- Al Amor O A La Vida (1986)

== See also ==
- List of Puerto Ricans
- French immigration to Puerto Rico
- Menudo
