= More Than Words (EP) =

EP by Menudo
- Released: December 18, 2007
- Genre: Pop, R&B
- Language: English, Spanish
- Label: Epic

Menudo chronology
La historia (2007)	More Than Words (2007)	Un Nuevo Comienzo (A New Beginning) (2023)

More Than Words is an extended play by the boy band Menudo, released on December 18, 2007, under the label Epic. The release brings together four tracks and represents the group's first official release following its return with a new lineup.

The extended play (EP) marks the debut of the revamped Menudo formed through the MTV reality show Making Menudo and preceded the release of a full-length album planned for 2008. Marketed exclusively at Target stores in the United States, it was promoted through television appearances and received favorable reviews from some media outlets.

== Background and release ==
The release marked the band's return with a new lineup, consisting of Carlos, Chris, Emmanuel, José, and Monti, who were selected through the MTV reality show Making Menudo. The show featured 15 finalists competing for a spot in the new version of the group, with five chosen to record a new album. After the members were selected, the group recorded around forty songs.

The EP features four tracks and was the first official release by the new Menudo lineup. The compact disc (CD) was sold exclusively at Target stores in the United States.

== Promotion ==
As part of the promotional campaign, the quintet appeared on several TV shows and promotional events, performing some of the tracks and preparing for the release of their full-length album, which was scheduled for spring 2008.

The song "Move" was included in the soundtrack of the music and dance series Dance on Sunset, hosted by Quddus (Benjamin Quddus Philippe) on Nickelodeon. The show featured dance routines called "Fresh-Squeezed Dance," designed for its tween and teen audience to follow along. Each episode featured a special guest. In the seventh episode, aired on May 10, 2008, Menudo made an appearance, performing "Move".

== Critical reception ==
Professional ratings
Review scores
Source	Rating
The Press Democrat	Favorable

Mario Tarradell of The Press Democrat gave the EP a favorable review, describing it as a "teaser" to build anticipation for the full album. He noted that the songs' style is pop-R&B and added that the group's sound is highly produced, instantly catchy, and aimed at a broad audience. Furthermore, he mentioned that Menudo tries to appeal to fans of artists like Fergie, Rihanna, and Chris Brown, but the members' nationality and profile keep their strongest fanbase among young Latino audiences.

== Track listing ==
No.	Title	Writer(s)	Length
1.	"More Than Words (A E I O U)"	Danja	3:41
2.	"Más que amor (A E I O U)"		3:41
3.	"Move"	Cotrell Qualls, Jamie Newman	3:31
4.	"This Christmas"	Donny Hathaway, Nadine McKinnor	3:02

== Personnel ==
Credits adapted from the liner notes of the CD More Than Words (EP), by Menudo, released in 2007.

- From left to right on the cover image: Carlos, Chris, José, Monti, Emmanuel
- Tracks 1 and 2 produced by Danja and The Clutch
- Track 3 produced by JNew
- Track 4 produced by The Clutch and Cardiff Giants
