= Sombras & Figuras =

Sombras Y Figuras

Studio album by Menudo
- Released: 1988
- Studio: Melody
- Genre: Latin Pop

Menudo chronology
Sons Of Rock (1988)	Sombras Y Figuras (1988)	Los Últimos Héroes (1989)

Sombras Y Figuras (Shadows and Figures) is the twenty-seventh studio album (18th in Spanish) by the Puerto Rican boy band Menudo, released in 1988 by the Melody record label. The tracklist includes songs from a series of composers who were quite popular at the time, such as the Argentine Miguel Mateos.

The group members at that time included Ricky Martin, Sergio Blass, Rubén Gómez, Angelo García, and new member Robert Avellanet. Robert replaced Raymond Acevedo after Raymond suddenly quit the band becoming the fourth member (Miguel Cancel 1st, Robby Rosa 2nd, and Ralphy Rodríguez 3rd) ever to do so.

With the album, Menudo achieved their best commercial performance on the Latin Pop Albums chart of Billboard (reaching the Top 20), as well as their second-best performance (reaching the Top 40) during the 1980s, with the single "Historia Del Primer Amor" on the Hot Latin Songs chart of the same magazine.

== Background ==
The quintet at this time consisted of singers Ricky Martin, Sergio Blass, Rubén Gómez, Angelo García, and Robert Avellanet, who replaced Raymond Acevedo. Robert, who was 12 years old when he joined the group, is the nephew of Puerto Rican singer Chucho Avellanet, and made his first appearance on the television show Noche de Gala.

Raymond Acevedo, a member since 1985, left the band at age 16. The decision was motivated by administrative differences and a lack of security with the new management. The sale of Menudo to Panamanian investors was made in 1987, and the group's management had changed the compensation system for the members, from a fixed salary to a percentage of profits. Although Raymond's departure was planned for late September or early October, it was brought forward due to these factors. In an interview, the singer's father stated that Raymond might consider a return to the entertainment world in the future.

This would be the last album recorded by Ricky Martin as a member of the band. During a press conference at the Melody record label's studios in Mexico City, he revealed that his farewell would take place during the promotional tour in Puerto Rico, at a performance scheduled for the last week of July that year (1989), at the Teatro de Bellas Artes de San Juan. In his autobiography, the singer said that the choice of location was perfect, as his first performance had taken place in the same venue.

== Promotion ==
In October 1988, the newspaper La Opinion reported that the group would be in Mexico the following month to promote the album Sombras y Figuras throughout the country. The promotion would include interviews, appearances on television shows and radio, as well as concerts in various cities across the country. According to the publication, at that time, the group would perform with their new member, Roberto Avellanet.

In 1989, the group performed at the Teatro Teresa Carreño during the Prêmios Ronda, where Rawy, Ricky Martin's replacement, was also introduced.

== Singles ==
The singles "En Mis Sueños" and Niña Luna were released in physical format. The song "Historia Del Primer Amor" reached the Top 20 on the Billboard Hot Latin Songs chart at position 34, staying among the most commercially successful songs for just one week (February 25, 1989). The song "Gafas Oscuras" reached the top positions on music charts in Mexico, and Venezuela.

== Commercial performance ==
The album achieved Menudo's best commercial performance on the Latin Pop Albums chart of Billboard, peaking at number 16 and staying on the chart for thirteen consecutive weeks, the longest duration the group had with one of their albums on the list. According to the book Menudo: el reencuentro con la verdad, the album earned a platinum record in less than four weeks for its sales.

== Track listing ==
No.	Title	Writer(s)	Lead vocalist	Length
1.	"Dulces Dieciséis"	Miguel Mateos	Rubén Gómez	3:50
2.	"Primero Lo Primero"	Pedro Galy	Sergio Blass	4:13
3.	"Auxilio"	Lara y Monarrez	Ricky Martin	3:46
4.	"Historia Del Primer Amor"	Lara y Monarrez	Robert Avellanet	3:35
5.	"Escapando De Ti"	Carlos Gaviola	Angelo García	3:45
6.	"Jóvenes"	Lara y Monarrez	Sergio Blass	3:58
7.	"En Mis Sueños"	William Luke	Angelo García	3:22
8.	"Gafas Oscuras"	Pedro Gely	Ricky Martin	3:55
9.	"Niña Luna"	Riba Campos	Rubén Gómez	3:48
10.	"Serenata Rock'N Roll"	Pedro Gely	Robert Avellanet	3:29

== Charts ==
Weekly performance of Sombras & Figuras
Music Chart (1988)	Peak Position
United States (Billboard Latin Pop Albums)	16

== Certifications ==
Region	Certification
Puerto Rico	Platinum
