= Can't Get Enough (Menudo album) =

Studio album by Menudo
- Released: 1986
- Genre: Latin pop
- Length: 31:18

Menudo chronology
Refrescante... (1986)	Can't Get Enough (1986)	The Best of Menudo (1986)

Can't Get Enough is the twenty-third studio album by the Puerto Rican boy band Menudo and their third release in English, launched by RCA Victor in 1986. The group’s lineup for this album included Charlie Massó, Robi Rosa, Ricky Martin, Raymond Acevedo, and Sergio Gonzalez.

The album consists of nine tracks: five original songs and four English cover versions of tracks from the 1986 album Refrescante.... The tracks alternate between romantic ballads and danceable rock.

== Promotion ==
As part of its promotion, Padosa Records produced a TV special directed and produced by Edgardo Díaz. Titled Puerto Rico... La Tierra de Menudo, the special featured commentary from the members and music videos for seven of the nine album tracks, as well as three songs from previous albums. The videos were filmed at various locations in Puerto Rico, including "Marie (I Need You)," "Tell Me How You Feel," "No One Can Love You More," "Dolci Bacci," "Alegria," "Volta Para Mim," "I Can't Spend Another Day," "Old Enough to Love," "Jumpin' Over," and "Summer in the Streets."

The group promoted the album in Brazil. On May 1, 1987, they appeared on the Show Maravilha program, hosted by Mara Maravilha on the SBT, performing the songs "Maria (I Need You)" and "I Can't Spend Another Day" alongside their new member, Ralphy Rodríguez.

In Philippines, the group performed on the GMA Supershow, where they sang "Summer in the Streets" and received a gold record for the album The Best of Menudo (1986) from a representative of OctoArts International.

In 1987, the group launched the Summer in the Streets Tour (named after the album’s lead track), which included 34 shows across various cities in the United States. The tour concluded in August of the same year. The tour also marked the group’s tenth anniversary and the addition of Ralphy Rodríguez, who replaced Charlie Massó.

== Critical reception ==
Professional ratings
Review scores
Source	Rating
AllMusic	3/5 stars

Regarding music criticism, the critic from the AllMusic website rated the album three out of five stars but did not provide any written comments on it.

Julio Brasilia, from the newspaper Diário do Pará, wrote a review stating that the album's tracks alternate between "romantic ballads and super danceable rock songs." According to him, the album's standout track is "No One Can Love You More," which was receiving high airplay on radio stations.

== Commercial performance ==
The song "No One Can Love You More" appeared on charts in Brazil, according to reports published in the newspapers La Opinión and Jornal do Brasil.

== Track listing ==
No.	Title	Performer	Length
1.	"Summer In The Streets"	Robby Rosa	3:51
2.	"We Have A Song"	Robby Rosa	3:46
3.	"Tell Me How You Feel"	Raymond Acevedo	3:31
4.	"No One Can Love You More"	Robby Rosa	3:57
5.	"Old Enough To Love"	Robby Rosa	3:22
6.	"Jumpin' Over" (Salta La Valla)	Charlie Massó	3:25
7.	"I Can't Spend Another Day" (Con Un Beso Y Una Flor)	Ricky Martin	3:37
8.	"Stay With Me" (Besame)	Robby Rosa	4:00
9.	"Marie (I Need You)" (Amiga Mia)	Sergio Gonzalez	3:09
