= Feelin' (song) =

Single by Menudo

from the album Un Nuevo Comienzo (A New Beginning)
- Language: Spanish
- Released: May 26, 2023
- Genre: Latin pop
- Label: Mistar Entertainment, LLC

Menudo singles chronology
"Mi amore" (2023)	"Feelin'" (2023)	"Tu y yo" (2023)

"Feelin'" is a song by American boy band Menudo, released on May 26, 2023, as the second single from their first extended play (EP), titled Un nuevo comienzo (A New Beginning), under the label Mistar Entertainment, LLC. The song was written by Luis Salazar, Yoel Henríquez, Andy Clay, and Kemzo, and produced by the musical production team VrB Tunes (Orlando Vitto and Renzo Bravo).

According to the newspaper El Periódico USA, the song "represents the evolution of the young artists while staying true to the signature sound that resonates with all ages".

== Promotion ==
As part of their promotion, the group performed on television shows. On July 2, 2024, the quintet surprised the audience with an appearance on America's Got Talent. During the performance, the five members sang their original song "Amnesia", but were interrupted by Simon Cowell, who requested another track. In response, the group performed "Feelin'", securing a spot in the next round of the competition and earning praise from the judges and audience.

The music video for the song was directed by Brian Bayerl and features Alejandro, Andrés, Gabriel, Ezra, and Nicolás showcasing their dance moves and group chemistry.

== Commercial performance ==
Commercially, the song debuted at number 24 on the Billboard's Latin Pop Airplay chart, and peaked at number 23 the following week. In total, it spent three weeks on the chart. Additionally, it surpassed 10 million views on YouTube shortly after its release.

== Track listing ==
No.	Title	Writer(s)	Length
1.	"Feelin'"	Andy Clay; Yoel Henríquez; Luis Salazar; Carlos Humberto Dominguez Kemzo	2:42
2.	"Mi Amore" (Spanish version)	Warren Meyers; Jonas Zekkari; Jordan Fairie; Anjeanette Chirino	3:20
3.	"Mi Amore"	W. Meyers; J. Zekkari; J. Fairie; A. Chirino	3:20

== Charts ==
Weekly charts for "Feelin'"
Chart (2023)	Peak position
US Latin Pop Airplay (Billboard)	23
