= Los últimos héroes =

Los Últimos Héroes

Studio album by Menudo
- Released: April 18, 1989
- Genres: Latin pop, Latin rock
- Length: 35:52
- Label: Sonografica
- Producer: Willie Croes

Menudo chronology
Sombras Y Figuras (1988)	Los Últimos Héroes (1989)	La Colección (1990)

Los Últimos Héroes (The Last Heroes) is a studio album by the Puerto Rican boy band Menudo, released in 1989 by the record label Melody. The album was produced and recorded in Caracas, Venezuela, by Willie Croes, who is a producer and husband of Brazilian singer Elisa Rego. The group's lineup included Sergio Gonzalez, Rubén Gómez, Angelo García, Robert Avellanet, and the new member Rawy Torres, who replaced Ricky Martin.

== Promotion ==
To promote the album, the group embarked on an extensive tour, performing 40 shows in the United States and various other countries in South America. In 1989, a concert held in Caracas was released on VHS. The recordings took place at El Poliedro De Caracas on October 28 and 29 (Saturday and Sunday), 1989.

The album's title was revived years later when the group reunited for a series of concerts in Puerto Rico and other Latin America countries in 2002 and 2005. This was the last album to feature Angelo García, who left the group at age 13 and was replaced by César Abreu.

== Commercial performance ==
The album achieved significant commercial success, selling 40,000 copies in the United States, and earning a platinum certification in Venezuela. The album's success inspired a homonymous telenovela miniseries, featuring future member Jonathan Montenegro in the cast.

== Track listing ==
No.	Title	Writer(s)	Singer	Length
1.	"Los Últimos Héroes"	Carlos Lara	Sergio Gonzalez	3:46
2.	"Sin Tu Amor"	Juan Carlos Pérez Soto	Ruben Gomez	3:54
3.	"Por Primera Vez"	Fernando Osorio	Rawy Torres	3:17
4.	"Qué Pena"	Fernando Osorio	Robert Avellanet	3:36
5.	"Giro"	Juan Carlos Pérez Soto	Angelo Garcia	4:42
6.	"Viejos Amigos"	Carlos Lara	Rawy Torres	3:57
7.	"Ahora Sé"	Fernando Osorio	Robert Avellanet	3:14
8.	"Déjenme Pasar"	Fernando Osorio	Sergio Gonzalez	3:42
9.	"No volverá a ocurrir"	Jesús Monarrez	Angelo Garcia	3:04
10.	"Ven Y Enséñame"	Fernando Osorio	Ruben Gomez	3:25

== Certification and sales ==
Country	Certification	Certified units/sales
United States	—N/a	40,000
Venezuela	Platinum	100,000 (Note: According to a 1994 report by the Gavin Report, an album would achieve platinum certification in Venezuela if it reached the milestone of 100,000 copies sold.)
