= Somos Los Hijos del Rock =

Somos Los Hijos Del Rock

Studio album by Menudo
- Released: 1987
- Studio: Melody
- Genre: Latin pop, latin rock

Menudo chronology
The Best of Menudo (1986)	Somos Los Hijos Del Rock (1987)	In Action (1987)

Somos Los Hijos Del Rock (We Are the Children of Rock) is the twenty-fourth studio album by the Puerto Rican boy band Menudo, released in 1987 by the Melody label. The group’s lineup included members: Ricky Martin, Raymond Acevedo, Sergio Blass, and new members Ralphy Rodríguez and Rubén Gómez. Ralphy replaced Charlie Massó and Ruben Gómez replaced Robby Rosa.

The album was produced with the intention of renewing Menudo both visually and musically, and produced the successful single "Y Te Veré - A Las Tres," which appeared on the Billboard magazine's Hot Latin Songs chart.

In 1987, an album titled In Action was released in the Philippines, featuring versions in English and Tagalog of various Menudo songs, including three tracks from Somos Los Hijos Del Rock: "Estamos En Acción" ("Action"), "Mi Sombra En La Pared - Bailo Con Mi Sombra" ("My Shadow On The Wall"), and "Dame Más" ("Gimme More"). In the same year, an album aimed at the U.S. market was released, titled Sons of Rock, featuring new songs, though it carried a similar name to the Spanish-language album.

== New members ==
In 1986, the company Padosa América, which managed the band's career, announced a new member: Ralphy Rodríguez, a bilingual New Yorker, chosen from hundreds of candidates through a series of auditions. He would replace Charlie Rivera starting in January 1987.

In 1987, another new member, Rubén Gómez, was announced. He was 12 years old at the time and would replace Charlie Massó, who had completed five years (the limit for staying in the group) as a member of Menudo.

== Production ==
The group had been experiencing a decline in album sales, and the artists had to switch labels. In an effort to renew the audience, the producers decided that the artists would have to completely change their appearance, as well as the sound of their music. The once dance-pop music and colorful style were replaced by a more rock-inspired style of singing and dressing.

The tracklist includes four cover versions by the rock band Miguel Mateos - Zas, taken from their 1986 album Solos En América*. According to the producer of Zas, Oscar López: “The conversations had been going on for some years with the Menudo team to record Miguel’s songs. Far from any prejudice, I thought it was a great promotion for a teen group with so much success to record Zas songs, considering the projection I had in mind [to expand Zas’ career] abroad.”

== Singles ==
The singles chosen for release were "Mi Sombra En La Pared (Bailo Con Mi Sombra)", "Dame Más", and "Estamos En Acción". The single "Y Te Veré - A Las Tres" became the most successful on the Billboard Hot Latin Songs chart, reaching number 45 and remaining on the chart for five consecutive weeks.

== Commercial performance ==
According to a report from Billboard, although the group’s album sales had declined over time, record distributors in Puerto Rico reported that orders for the album Somos Los Hijos Del Rock were growing as quickly as when the band first began its career.

== Track listing ==
No.	Title	Writer(s)	Lead vocalist	Length
1.	"Mi Sombra En La Pared - Bailo Con Mi Sombra"	Miguel Mateos	Sergio Blass	4:43
2.	"Ámame Ahora, No Mañana"	Miguel Mateos	Ricky Martin	3:28
3.	"Cuando Seas Grande"	Miguel Mateos	Ralphy Rodríguez	4:31
4.	"Agua Y Viento"	Pedro Gely	Raymond Acevedo	4:02
5.	"Nena"	Pedro Gely	Rubén Gómez	2:47
6.	"Estamos En Acción"	Sosa; Lupis	Rubén Gómez	3:33
7.	"Dame Más"	Miguel Mateos	Ricky Martin	3:44
8.	"Y Te Veré - A Las Tres"	Miguel Mateos	Ralphy Rodríguez	4:05
9.	"Gimme More"	Miguel Mateos	Raymond Acevedo	3:50
10.	"Mi Corazón"	Miguel Mateos	Sergio Blass	4:20
