= Laura (Menudo album) =

1978 Menudo album

Studio album by Menudo
- Released: 1978
- Studio: Estudio TorreSonido, Spain
- Genre: Latin pop
- Length: 29:26
- Label: Padosa, Inc.
- Producer: Edgardo Diaz

Menudo chronology
| Los Fantasmas (1977) | Laura (1978) | Chiquitita (1979) |

Laura is the second studio album by the Puerto Rican boy band Menudo, released in 1978 by the record label Padosa. The group at the time included the Sallaberry brothers, Fernando and Nefty, and the Meléndez brothers, Óscar, Carlos, and Ricky. This was the last album to feature Nefty as a member; in 1979, he left the group upon reaching the age limit of 15 and was replaced by René Farrait.

== Background ==
The recording sessions of Laura took place in Spain, as Edgardo Díaz, the group's manager and creator, believed that the recording studios there were much better than those in Puerto Rico. The boys' names were not included in the album's graphic credits. Díaz wanted to highlight and develop the personality of Menudo as a group exclusively, rather than highlighting the artistic talents of its members as individuals. According to him, this way, the loyalty of the fans would remain exclusively with the group, and not with each of the boys who made up Menudo at any given time.

== Commercial performance ==
The album managed to chart with two songs on the music charts, the songs "Cucubano" and "Gongoli" made it onto the Dominican Republic singles sales charts, reaching positions 2 and 6, respectively.

According to Damarisse Martínez Ruiz, author of the book Menudo: El Reencuentro con la Verdad, although the group's first experience with Los Fantasmas was not entirely successful, it planted a fertile seed that would later yield a bountiful harvest of achievements. The author notes that Laura achieved even greater commercial success, selling more copies than its predecessor.

== Track listing ==
| No. | Title | Writer(s) | Singer(s) | Length |
|---|---|---|---|---|
| 1. | "El Ayer" | Socorro Centeno | Nefty Sallaberry |
| 2. | "Llegas Tú" | Leyda E. Colón | Entire Group |
| 3. | "María Pilar" | Socorro Centeno | Óscar and Ricky Meléndez |
| 4. | "Laura" | Julio Seijas, Luis G. Escolar | Entire Group |
| 5. | "Gongoli" | Leyda E. Colón | Entire Group |
| 6. | "Fuego" | Leyda E. Colón | Entire Group |
| 7. | "El Momento Del Adió" | Socorro Centeno | Fernando Sallaberry |
| 8. | "Isole" | Leyda E. Colón | Entire Group |
| 9. | "Libre Mi Corazón" | Leyda E. Colón | Entire Group |
| 10. | "Cucubano" | Curet Alonso | Carlos Meléndez |
