= Los Fantasmas =

Studio album by Menudo
- Released: February 2, 1977
- Recorded: 1976
- Studio: VU Recording Studio, San Juan
- Genre: Latin pop
- Length: 29:25
- Label: Padosa, Inc.
- Producer: Edgardo Diaz

Menudo chronology
Los Fantasmas (1977)	Laura (1978)

Los Fantasmas (The Ghosts) is the first studio album by the Puerto Rican boy band Menudo, released in 1977 by the Padosa record label. The album introduced the group's original lineup, formed by producer Edgardo Díaz, and marked the beginning of Menudo's recording career. Although its initial commercial impact was modest in Puerto Rico, the release established the foundation for the group’s growing popularity.

Several tracks from the album were released as singles and achieved chart success in the Dominican Republic, including "Mamadú", "Enséñame a Cantar", "Calma Ya", "Madre", and the title track "Los Fantasmas". These singles contributed to Menudo's early visibility in the Caribbean music scene and set the stage for their follow-up album, Laura, later in 1977.

== Background ==
The original lineup of Menudo was formed by producer Edgardo Díaz and consisted of two sets of brothers: Nefty and Fernando Sallaberry and brothers Carlos, Óscar and Ricky Meléndez. The group’s name originated during their second rehearsal, when Díaz’s sister unexpectedly entered the garage where the boys were practicing and, surprised to see them singing and dancing, exclaimed: “¡Cuánto menudo hay aquí!” (“What a lot of young folk we have here!”). The phrase was adopted as the band’s official name.

In the years leading up to the release of Los Fantasmas, Menudo performed extensively across Puerto Rico. Their appearances included shopping centers, local patron saint festivals ("fiestas patronales"), and a variety of community events, which helped them establish a growing youth audience, gaining popularity and soon earning enough recognition to hold their first major concert at the Parque de Juncos in Puerto Rico.

== Release and promotion ==
Released in 1977, Los Fantasmas marked the group's studio debut. The promotion of the album relied heavily on live performances, particularly in public venues that reached a wide demographic of children and families. The title track gained recognition in Puerto Rico and became a staple of the group’s early repertoire. Its popularity contributed to Menudo securing a weekly television program on Telemundo Canal 2, broadcast on Saturday nights, which provided a consistent platform to showcase their songs. The increased exposure through television and live appearances strengthened the visibility of the album and laid the foundation for the release of their second studio effort, Laura, later that year.

== Singles ==
Several singles were released from Los Fantasmas and achieved chart success in the Dominican Republic. The first to appear was "Mamadú," which reached number five on the Record World Latin America Hit Parade on March 4, 1978. It was followed by "Enséñame a Cantar", peaking at number seven on March 25, 1978.

In May 1978, "Calma Ya" entered the chart and reached number six on May 13. Shortly after, the ballad "Madre" rose to number four on June 10, 1978. The title track, "Los Fantasmas", also became one of the group's most recognized songs from the album, climbing to number four on August 12, 1978. Collectively, the singles helped to expand Menudo's visibility beyond Puerto Rico and contributed to their growing popularity in the Caribbean region.

== Commercial performance ==
According to Damarisse Martínez Ruiz, author of the book Menudo: El Reencuentro con la Verdad, Edgardo's decision to produce the quintet's first album in 1977 represented an important step in formalizing Menudo as a professional musical project. However, she notes that its immediate reception in the market was relatively modest. The release did not generate a substantial commercial breakthrough at the time, selling 6,000 in the Puerto Rico market.

== Track listing ==
No.	Title	Writer(s)	Singer(s)	Length
1.	"Mamadú"	Pepin, G. Dann, Pacaud	Fernando Sallaberry, Carlos and Óscar Meléndez	3:15
2.	"Madre"	Juan Pardo	Carlos Meléndez	2:48
3.	"Los Fantasmas"	Honorio Herrero	Group	3:02
4.	"Porque Te Ame"	Juan Carlos Calderón	Nefty Sallaberry	2:57
5.	"Mi Guitarra"	Juan Pardo	Fernando Sallaberry and Carlos Meléndez	2:55
6.	"Calma Ya"	Afric Simone, Stan Regal (adapted by Edgardo Díaz)	Óscar Meléndez	2:38
7.	"Enséñame A Cantar"	Fernando Arbex	Nefty Sallaberry	3:36
8.	"Quiero Verte Feliz"	Carlos F. Prida	Carlos Meléndez	2:51
9.	"Dos Niños"	John Farrell	Fernando Sallaberry	3:04
10.	"Los Lios"	R. Pérez Botija	Ricky Meléndez	2:28

== Personnel ==
Credits adapted from Los Fantasmas LP liner notes.

- Arranged by Teddy Mulet
- Directed by Edgardo Diaz
- Photographe Manny Garcia
- Mixed by Vinny Urrutia
- Record Company: VU Recordings
- Mixed at VU Recordings
