= Refrescante... =

Refrescante

Studio album by Menudo
- Released: 1986
- Recorded: 1986
- Genre: Latin pop
- Label: RCA Records
- Producer: Edgardo Daíz

Menudo chronology
| Viva! Bravo! (1986) | Refrescante (1986) | Can't Get Enough (1986) |

Refrescante... (Refreshing...), titled Menudo in the Brazilian edition, is a studio album by the Puerto Rican boy band Menudo, released in 1986 by RCA Records. It is the group's seventeenth album in Spanish and their third in Portuguese. The lineup at the time included members Ricky Martin, Robby Rosa, Charlie Massó, Raymond Acevedo, and Sérgio González.

The album was produced by the trio Edgardo Díaz, Carlos Vilela, and Alejandro Monroy (the latter two being the principal composers of the work). The tracklist includes songs in the ballad and pop styles.

Regarding the Brazilian edition, it marked the first time the group recorded songs written by Brazilian composers: the single "Diga Sim," for example, was written by Ed Wilson and Carlos Colla; the song "Alegria" was composed by Michael Sullivan and Paulo Massadas; and "Cara ou Coroa" is a version adapted by Carlos Costa.

== Singles ==
"Bésame" was released as the album's lead single. Among the singles, it achieved the best commercial performance on the music chart published by Billboard, reaching number 21 on the Hot Latin Songs chart, the group's highest position on that chart with a single.

Other singles from the Spanish edition include "Hoy Me Voy Para México," "A Cara, O Cruz," "Salta La Valla," "Amiga Mia," and "La Primera Vez." "Hoy Me Voy Para México" was re-recorded in English as "I'm Going Back to the Philippines" and included in the group's fourth English album, In Action, released in 1987.

The singles from Menudo (the Portuguese edition) were "Cara ou Coroa" and "Diga Sim," with the latter reaching the top 10 on 105 FM radio. The track "Hoje a Noite Não Tem Luar" was later recorded by the Brazilian group Legião Urbana for their album Acústico MTV. According to one of the group's members, Dado Villa-Lobos, the lead singer Renato Russo was a Menudo fan and followed the group's tour in Rio.

== Critical reception ==
Professional ratings
Review scores
| Source | Rating |
|---|---|
| AllMusic | 2/5 stars |

Edgar Augusto, writing for Diário do Pará in his review of the Portuguese-language version of the album, stated that the album differs from the group’s previous works only in its language. According to the journalist, the "Electronic drums, synthesizers patched with violins, dull melodies, and pseudo-youthful lyrics" present in previous albums are also featured in Menudo. He concluded his review by writing: "For the Menudos, just another album. For us, a piece of nonsense".

== Commercial performance ==
The Spanish version of the album reached the number 16 spot on the music chart Latin Pop Albums by Billboard magazine.

== Track listing ==
| No. | Title | Performer | Length |
|---|---|---|---|
| 1. | "Salta La Valla" | Charlie Massó | 3:22 |
| 2. | "Hoy Me Voy Para México" | Raymond Acevedo | 3:26 |
| 3. | "Con Un Beso Y Una Flor" | Ricky Martin | 3:27 |
| 4. | "La Primera Vez" | Robby Rosa | 2:54 |
| 5. | "América" | Sérgio González | 2:54 |
| 6. | "A Cara O Cruz" | Charlie Massó and Robby Rosa | 3:54 |
| 7. | "Amor, Siempre Amor" | Raymond Acevedo | 3:34 |
| 8. | "Bésame" | Robby Rosa | 3:54 |
| 9. | "Yo Te Quiero Mucho" (Only in Spanish) | Ricky Martin | 3:00 |
| 10. | "Amiga Mía" | Sérgio González | 3:01 |

Portuguese Edition
| No. | Title | Performer | Length |
|---|---|---|---|
| 1. | "Vem Pra Luz do Sol" | Charlie Massó | 3:22 |
| 2. | "Hoje A Noite Não Tem Luar" | Raymond Acevedo | 3:26 |
| 3. | "Com Um Beijo e Uma Flor" | Ricky Martin | 3:27 |
| 4. | "Segredo" | Robby Rosa | 4:11 |
| 5. | "E Deus Criou A Mulher" | Sérgio González | 2:54 |
| 6. | "Cara Ou Coroa" | Charlie Massó and Robby Rosa | 3:54 |
| 7. | "Amor, Sempre Amor" | Raymond Acevedo | 3:34 |
| 8. | "Apaga As Luzes" | Robby Rosa | 3:54 |
| 9. | "Minha Princesa" | Sérgio González | 3:01 |
| 10. | "Alegria" (Only in Portuguese) | Charlie Massó | 3:03 |
| 11. | "Diga Sim" (Only in Portuguese) | Robby Rosa | 3:42 |

== Production ==
- Produced by Edgardo Díaz for Padosa América Inc.
- Arranged and conducted by Carlos Villa & Alejandro Monroy.
- Engineered by Carlos Villa & Alejandro Monroy.
- All songs written by Carlos Villa & Alejandro Monroy.

== Charts ==
| Chart (1986) | Peak position |
|---|---|
| US Latin Pop Albums (Billboard) | 16 |
