= Quiero Ser =

Studio album by Menudo
- Released: May 9, 1981
- Recorded: 1980–1981
- Studio: Kirios Studios (Madrid); Ochoa Recordings (San Juan)
- Genre: Rock; rock and roll; Latin rock; Latin pop
- Length: 31:53
- Label: PADOSA; RCA Victor
- Producer: Edgardo Díaz; Alejandro Monroy; Carlos Villa

Menudo chronology
Xanadu (1981)	Quiero Ser (1981)	De Colección (1982)

Quiero Ser (I Want to Be) (also titled Rock Chiquillo in Puerto Rico) is the ninth studio album by the Puerto Rican boy band Menudo, released in 1981 by Padosa Records. The lineup at the time included members Ricky Meléndez, René Farrait, Johnny Lozada, Xavier Serbiá and Miguel Cancel. With this new album, the group traveled to Latin American countries where they were still unknown, such as Guatemala and Colombia.

== Background ==
The song "Súbete a mi Moto" (also known as "Sube a mi Motora" in Puerto Rico) became one of the most popular tracks on the album, considered by fans as the band's signature song. According to some media outlets, the song speaks of experiencing freedom. The track generated controversy in Puerto Rico because, at the time of its release, "moto" was slang for illegal drugs, particularly marijuana cigarettes.

"Claridad" was originally recorded by the Italian singer Umberto Tozzi under the title "Stella Stai." The Spanish version of the song, adapted by the Cuban producer Óscar Gómez Díaz, became one of the biggest hits of the Puerto Rican boyband. Despite its Italian origin, the Spanish lyrics convey a completely different meaning, focusing on the desire to overcome a romantic breakup, while Tozzi's original was known for its poetic complexity, described by the composer himself as "having no defined meaning." Tozzi's version was part of the soundtrack for the Marvel Studios film Spider-Man: Far From Home. In the digital era, "Claridad" found a new audience through the #MenudoChallenge on TikTok.

The album’s title track, "Quiero Ser," notably reached number 6 on Uruguay’s music chart, published by Record World.

== Commercial performance ==
Commercially, the album became a success. In Venezuela, it sold 334,000 copies. In the United States, it appeared on Billboard magazine’s Latin music charts. According to a 1981 report by Record World, each Menudo album released in Mexico to date (Fuego and Quiero Ser) had sold half a million copies between LPs and cassettes.

In 1998, the album was released along with three other Menudo albums (Por Amor, Una Aventura Llamada Menudo, and Fuego) on CD. According to Billboard, in their first week of sales, the four albums together surpassed 10,000 units sold in the United States.

== Track listing ==
No.	Title	Writer(s)	Singer(s)	Length
1.	"Mi Banda Toca Rock"	Ivano Fossati	Johnny Lozada	3:00
2.	"Quiero Ser"	Edgardo Díaz; Pepe Luis Soto	René Farrait	3:08
3.	"Rock En La TV"	Díaz; Carlos Villa	Miguel Cancel	3:16
4.	"Bailemos En El Mar"	Díaz; Villa	Cancel	3:17
5.	"Claridad"	Umberto Tozzi	Group	4:16
6.	"Súbete A Mi Moto"	Díaz; Villa	Farrait	3:35
7.	"Mejor"	F. Arbex; M. Callejo	Group	2:54
8.	"Solo Tú, Solo Yo"	Díaz; Soto	Group	3:08
9.	"Enamorado del Amor"	Díaz; Soto	Lozada	4:03
10.	"Me Voy a Enamoriscar"	Juan Pardo	Cancel	3:23

(*) in Dominican Republic and Mexico: "Súbete a Mi Moto",
in Puerto Rico, Sube a mi Motora, in Brazil (Long Play and Tape) "Menudo Mania": "Sobe em Minha Moto", sung in Brazilian Portuguese by Ricky Meléndez and in English Motorcycle Dreamer first recorded by Miguel Cancel and then Ricky Meléndez in the album “Reaching Out”.

== Personnel ==
Adapted from album back cover

- Javier Romeu – drums
- Manuel Aguilar – bass
- José Ganoza – rhythm
- Carlos Villa – guitar
- Rafael Martínez – guitar
- Alejandro Monroy – piano

== Charts ==
Weekly chart performance for Quiero Ser
Chart (1981–1982)	Peak position
Argentina (Cashbox/Prensario)	6
US (Billboard Latin Pop Albums - Los Angeles)	13
US (Billboard Top Latin Albums - Nova Iorque)	2
US (Billboard Top Latin Albums - Texas)	4
Uruguai (Record World)	4

Weekly chart performance for Quiero Ser [CD]
Chart (1998)	Peak position
United States (Billboard Top Latin 50 Catalog)	3

== Certifications and sales ==
Region	Certification	Estimated sales
Venezuela	Gold	334 000
