= Hold Me (Menudo song) =

Single by Menudo

from the album Menudo
- Released: May–June 1985
- Genre: Synth-pop
- Length: 4:08
- Label: Sony Latin
- Songwriters: Howie Rice; Edgardo Díaz
- Producer: Howie Rice

Menudo singles chronology
"Motorcycle Dreamer" (1984)	"Hold Me" (1985)	"Please Be Good to Me" (1985)

"Hold Me" is a song by Latin American boy band Menudo, where Robby Rosa does the lead vocals. It was released in 1985, as the lead single from their self-titled studio album (1985). It was the band's only song to ever chart on the American Billboard Hot 100, where it peaked at number 62.

A music video was also shot for the song, filmed around various areas of Los Angeles.

== Reception and legacy ==
Suzette Fernandez from Billboard gave the song a positive review, saying "The English-language song featured a new generation of members and a sparkling synth-pop sound, to go with an impossibly infectious chorus, which made it a seamless fit in mid-'80s American pop".

Also Jason Lipshutz from Billboard has said: "A joyous declaration of love: Menudo is shown leaping and twirling around in the "Hold Me" music video, and this song has made listeners want to do the same for decades".

In 2018, Billboard ranked the song 53rd on its list of the "100 Greatest Boy Band Songs of All Time". In 2020, Rolling Stone ranked the song number 40 on its list of the "75 Greatest Boy Band Songs of All Time".

== Charts ==
Weekly chart for "Hold Me"
Chart (1985)	Peak position
US Billboard Hot 100	62
US Cash Box Top 100	61
