= Raymond Acevedo =

Puerto Rican singer

Ramón Enrique Acevedo Kerkadó (born December 21, 1971, in Bayamon, Puerto Rico) is a Puerto Rican pop singer, actor, and visual artist who was a member of the Puerto Rican boy band Menudo.

== Biography ==
He was a soloist when in 1985, Acevedo joined Menudo after his second audition when he was 13 years old. (Ricky Martin is three days younger than Raymond Acevedo.) In a concert in Japan, when they believed they didn't need a security deal, they were surprised when they were overcome by fans.

Acevedo sang such hits as "En San Juan me Enamore", “Pañuelo Blanco Americano", and "It's You and Me All The Way", which became an international hit. Along with his fellow Menudo members, Acevedo starred in the Argentina soap opera Por Siempre Amigos. The soap opera aired in 1987, and ran for 100 episodes. Acevedo left Menudo on August 2, 1988, and soon after moved to the United States.

Living in New York, Acevedo worked on Off-Broadway productions in New York City and wrote songs with cross-culture appeal.

In 1999, Acevedo and Aurelio Laing III collaborated on lyrics and music, ultimately creating Afterworld Records. During the winter of 2000, they recorded their first album, "Amor Oculto" ("Hidden Love"), in San Antonio, Texas, releasing it in 2001. In 2005, the two collaborated again on an alternative English release of his Age of Anxiety album.

In 2007, Acevedo performed a series of shows in Brazil and Latin America with a group called Menudo La Reunion.

In recent years, Acevedo released two guitar-driven pop songs “Addictive Love” and “La Vi En Paris” were recently released, along with music videos. He was also to appear in the play “Noches De Vellonera”, a musical/comedy performance, in Central Florida.

Acevedo also creates charcoal drawings and oil paintings, having attended a visual arts school in New York.

In 2018, Acevedo spent time on a TV and radio tour promoting his song Me enamoras in Puerto Rico.

== Personal life ==
He now lives in New York.

== Discography ==
=== With Menudo ===
- Menudo (1985)
- Ayer y Hoy (1985)
- Viva! Bravo! (1986)
- Refrescante (1986)
- Can't Get Enough (1986)
- Menudo (Portuguese) (1986)
- Somos Los Hijos del Rock (1987)
- In Action (1987)
- Sons of Rock (1987)

== See also ==
- List of Puerto Ricans
