= Por Amor (Menudo album) =

Studio album by Menudo
- Released: 1982
- Genre: Latin pop, pop rock
- Length: 33:43
- Label: RCA

Menudo chronology
De Colección (1982)	Por Amor (1982)	Una Aventura Llamada Menudo (1982)

Por Amor is the tenth studio album by the Puerto Rican boy band Menudo, released in 1982 by the Padosa record label. The group’s lineup at the time included Ricky Meléndez, Johnny Lozada, Xavier Serbiá, Miguel Cancel, and new member Charlie Massó, who replaced René Farrait.

== Promotion ==
As part of the album’s promotion, the group embarked on a tour with performances in several Latin American countries, including Colombia and Mexico, during which they performed songs such as "Quiero rock", "Dulces besos" and "Es por amor".

== Commercial performance ==
Commercially, the album became a success. On September 18, 1982, it reached number two on the Puerto Rico Top LPs chart published by Billboard magazine. In Venezuela, it sold 174,000 copies, which led to the album being certified gold in the country.

In 1998, the album was released on compact disc (CD) alongside three other Menudo albums (Quiero Ser, Una aventura llamada Menudo and Fuego). According to Billboard, in their first week of sales, the four albums combined surpassed 10,000 units sold in the United States.

== Track listing ==
No.	Title	Writer(s)	Lead vocalist	Length
1.	"Quiero rock"	Alejandro Monroy, Julio Seijas, Claudio Villa	Miguel Cancel	2:36
2.	"Lady"	Monroy, Seijas, Villa	Johnny Lozada	3:36
3.	"Y yo no bailo"	Monroy, Seijas, Villa	Ricky Meléndez	2:41
4.	"Es por amor"	Eddy Guerin, Seijas, Villa	Miguel Cancel	3:51
5.	"Chispa de la vida"	Monroy	Charlie Masso	3:06
6.	"Dulces besos"	Monroy, Seijas, Villa	Johnny Lozada	3:21
7.	"Fórmula"	Escolar	Xavier Serbiá	3:19
8.	"Cuándo pasará"	Luis Gómez-Escolar, Seijas	Miguel Cancel	3:48
9.	"Como eres tú"	Monroy, Villa	Group	3:48
10.	"Susana"	Escolar	Group	3:30

== Personnel ==
Credits adapted from Por Amor (1982) LP.

- A Padosa, Inc. production, Puerto Rico / Production: Edgardo Díaz Meléndez
- Recording mixed at Eurodisk – Madrid, Spain
- Arrangements and direction: Alejandro Monroy and Carlos Villa
- Camera photography – Madrid / Mechanical artwork – Madrid

== Charts ==
Weekly chart performance for Por Amor
Music chart (1982)	Peak position
United States (Billboard Top Latin Albums – California)	15
United States (Billboard Top Latin Albums – New York)	2
United States (Billboard Top Latin Albums – Texas)	9
Puerto Rico (Billboard Top Latin Albums)	2

Weekly chart performance for Por Amor [CD]
Chart (1998)	Peak position
United States (Billboard Top Latin 50 Catalog)	4

== Certifications and sales ==
Region	Certification	Estimated sales
Venezuela	Gold	174,000
