= Ayer y Hoy (Menudo album) =

Ayer y Hoy/A Festa Vai Começar

Studio album by Menudo
- Released: 1985
- Recorded: 1984 / 1985
- Genre: Pop
- Length: 35:26
- Labels: Padosa, RCA Victor, RCA Ariola
- Producer: Edgardo Díaz

Menudo chronology
Menudo (1985)	Ayer y Hoy/A Festa Vai Começar (1985)	Viva! Bravo! (1986)

Ayer y hoy (Yesterday and Today), titled A Festa Vai Começar in the Brazilian version, is the nineteenth studio album (the second in Portuguese) by the Puerto Rican boy band Menudo, released in 1985 by RCA Records. The album features members Ricky Martin, Robby Rosa, Charlie Massó, Roy Rosselló, and Raymond Acevedo.

Spanish singles include: "La fiesta va a empezar", and "Acercate", while the Brazilian version produced the singles: "Viva! Bravo!" and "Vem Por Favor".

The album was commercially successful, appearing on record charts in countries such as Brazil and United States.

== Production ==
The album was recorded in Spain and Puerto Rico, under the direction of Menudo's creator, Edgardo Díaz. The production and most of the compositions were done by Carlos Villa and Alejandro Monroy, two Spaniards men who always guided the group musically. In an interview about the album, Villa said: "The most amazing thing is that in these compositions the boys manage to give a magical touch, unique to youth." Alejandro Monroy, on the other hand, considered the work to be "the face of the boys. Just as the fans expect in terms of rhythm, themes, and balance. However, the final word will always be theirs".

One of the songs on the album, titled "Marcelo," was recorded as a tribute to a homeless boy from Brazil, whom the artists met during their tour in the country. According to member Roy: "One afternoon, we decided to take a group of boys, who were wandering the streets of Brazil with nowhere to go when night came, to our hotel (...) Among the group was Marcelo, and he won the affection of all of us".

== Promotion ==
To promote the album, the group visited Brazil to begin a tour featuring songs from the album and new choreographies for the tracks. Singer Ricky Martin said in an interview at the time: "Brazil fascinates me. That’s why being here again is a pleasure. I really enjoyed recording the new album A Festa Vai Começar, with lyrics in Portuguese, and it’s with the same joy that my companions and I are doing this show. Our band and the new songs are successful. The Brazilian audience is very 'caliente' and motivates us more and more to present the best of our music".

== Critical reception ==
Professional ratings
Review scores
Source	Rating
New Sunday Times	Mixed
Correio Braziliense	Unfavorable

The journalist from Correio Braziliense stated that despite the addition of a new member, Ramon, the album does not bring anything new. According to him, this happens because: "the producers, composers, and perhaps even the musicians are the same as always, and the songs are merely rushed versions of the same ones they sing in other languages".

R. S. Murthy, from the New Sunday Times, wrote that although Menudo presents a Latin pop with influences of funk and soul and sounds surprisingly mature for the age of the members, the songs are very reminiscent of other songs and styles, which takes away from the album's authenticity.

== Commercial performance ==
The Spanish version of the album reached number nineteen on the Billboard Latin Pop Albums chart, while A Festa Vai Começar reached number five on the Brazilian chart surveyed by Nelson Oliveira Pesquisa e Estudo de Mercado (Nopem).

According to the newspaper La Opinion, the song "Viva! Bravo!" reached number 5 on the music chart in La Paz, the capital of Bolivia.

== Track listing ==
Yesterday and Today
No.	Title	Writer(s)	Lead vocalist	Length
1.	"La Fiesta Va A Empezar"	Alejandro Monroy, Carlos Villa	Robby Rosa	3:42
2.	"Acércate"	A. Monroy, C. Villa	Charlie Massó	4:26
3.	"Aventureros"	A. Monroy, C. Villa, Mary Lynne M. Pagán	Raymond Acevedo	3:27
4.	"Marcelo"	A. Monroy, C. Villa, Edgardo Diaz	Robby Rosa	3:41
5.	"Me Siento Bien Con Mis Amigos"	A. Monroy, C. Villa	Ricky Martin and Raymond Acevedo	2:56
6.	"Viva! Bravo!"	A. Monroy, C. Villa	Charlie Massó	2:50
7.	"Pañuelo Blanco Americano"	A. Monroy, C. Villa	Raymond Acevedo	3:04
8.	"Soy Tuyo"	A. Monroy, C. Villa	Robby Rosa	4:00
9.	"En San Juan Me Enamoré"	A. Monroy, C. Villa, E. Diaz	Raymond Acevedo	4:00
10.	"Alegra Esa Cara"	A. Monroy, C. Villa	Roy Rosselló	3:00

A Festa Vai Começar
No.	Title	Writer(s)	Lead vocalist	Length
1.	"A Festa Vai Começar"	A. Monroy, C. Villa, vers. C. Colla	Robby Rosa	4:21
2.	"Vem, Por Favor"	A. Monroy, C. Villa, vers. C. Moore	Charlie Massó	2:52
3.	"Aventureiros"	A. Monroy, C. Villa, M. L. Pagán, vers. C. Colla	Raymond Acevedo	3:04
4.	"Marcelo"	A. Monroy, C. Villa, E. Díaz, vers. C. Colla	Robby Rosa	3:43
5.	"Me Sinto Bem Com Meus Amigos"	A. Monroy, C. Villa, vers. C. Colla	Ricky Martin and Raymond Acevedo	3:57
6.	"Viva! Bravo!"	A. Monroy, C. Villa, vers. C. Colla	Charlie Massó	3:31
7.	"Bandeira Sul-Americana"	A. Monroy, C. Villa, vers. C. Colla	Raymond Acevedo	3:45
8.	"Quero Ter Teu Amor"	A. Monroy, C. Villa, vers. C. Colla	Robby Rosa	3:04
9.	"Em San Juan Me Apaixonei"	A. Monroy, C. Villa, vers. C. Colla	Charlie Massó	4:05
10.	"Alegra Essa Cara"	A. Monroy, C. Villa, vers. C. Colla	Roy Rosselló	2:59
Total length:				35:21

== Charts ==
Ayer y Hoy

Weekly chart for Ayer y Hoy
Chart (1985)	Peak position
US Latin Pop Albums (Billboard)	19

A Festa Vai Começar

Weekly chart for A Festa Vai Começar
Chart (1985)	Peak Position
Brazil (Bizz - Top 10 Best-Selling)	7
Brazil (Nopem)	5
