= Menudo (album) =

Studio album by Menudo
- Released: 1985
- Genre: Pop
- Label: RCA International

Menudo chronology
| Evolución (1984) | Menudo (1985) | Ayer Y Hoy (1985) |

Menudo is a studio album by the Puerto Rican boy band Menudo, released in 1985 by RCA Records. It was the group's third self-titled album and featured the lineup of Charlie Massó, Roy Rosselló, Robby Rosa, Ricky Martin, and new member Raymond Acevedo, who replaced the departing Ray Reyes. The album contains seven original songs and three tracks translated into English from their previous album, Evolución. The production was overseen by the group's manager, Edgardo Díaz, with key contributions from producers Carlos Villa, Alejandro Monroy, and Howie Rice.

The album was part of RCA's strategic effort to break into the American market, while also receiving releases in Brazil and other Latin American countries, though with limited promotional support. Its promotion included a Pepsi-sponsored tour across the United States, during which the group performed live instead of relying on playback. The lead single, "Hold Me", featuring Robby Rosa on lead vocals, charted on the Billboard Hot 100 and Hot Hot R&B/Hip-Hop Songs charts.

== Background and production ==
Menudo was the third self-titled album by the group; the first was in 1981, also titled Fuego. The second was the group’s 17th album, also released in 1985, featuring members Charlie Massó, Roy Rosselló, Robby Rosa, Ricky Martin, and new member Raymond Acevedo. Raymond replaced Ray Reyes after Reyes left due to repeated conflicts between his father and the group’s manager. According to Ray’s brother, Raúl Reyes, his departure had long been anticipated.

The tracklist includes seven original songs, along with three tracks from the album Evolución translated into English. It features four songs produced by Howie Rice, who also worked on the Break Out album by the Pointer Sisters, earning a Grammy Awards nomination. It was overseen by the group’s founder and manager, Edgardo Diaz, alongside producers Carlos Villa and Alejandro Monroy, who collaborated with Rice and Mary Lynne Pagan.

== Release and promotion ==
The album was part of RCA's strategy to capture the American market, specifically targeting that audience. However, it was also released in Brazil and other Latin American countries, albeit with limited promotion, hindering its success in the charts. Its promotion included a U.S. tour sponsored by Pepsi, which featured live performances by the band—a notable departure from their previous reliance on playback.

The tour began in New York City and included stops in cities such as Philadelphia, San Francisco (California), San Diego, Los Angeles, San Antonio, Corpus Christi (Texas), Chicago, and Miami. In 1986, RCA released it on VHS. All songs from the album, except "Transformation", were included. In 2002, Image Entertainment re-released it on DVD, omitting a few tracks from a medley of hits.

== Singles ==
"Hold Me" was released as the lead single, with Robby Rosa on lead vocals. On Billboard music charts, it appeared on both the Billboard Hot 100 and Hot R&B/Hip-Hop Songs, reaching positions 62 and 61, respectively. On Cash Box magazine’s Top 100, it peaked at number 61. Regarding critical reception, Suzette Fernandez of Billboard magazine stated: "The English-language track introduced a new generation of members and a bright synth-pop sound, accompanied by an impossibly catchy chorus, making it a perfect fit for mid-'80s American pop". Jason Lipshutz, also from Billboard, remarked: "A joyful declaration of love: Menudo comes bouncing and twirling in the music video for 'Hold Me', and the song has been making listeners want to do the same for decades". In 2018, Billboard ranked the song 53rd on its list of "The 100 Greatest Boy Band Songs of All Time". In 2020, Rolling Stone magazine ranked it 40th on its list of "The 75 Greatest Boy Band Songs of All Time".

"Please Be Good To Me" was released as the second single, peaking at number 104 on the Billboard Bubbling Under Hot 100 chart.

== Critical reception ==
Professional ratings
Review scores
| Source | Rating |
|---|---|
| Toledo Blade | Unfavorable |
| Correio Braziliense | Unfavorable |

Paulo Pestana, from the newspaper Correio Braziliense, stated that the album features a standardized sound, similar to what is played on American FM radio, resulting in a more "balanced" outcome compared to the group's previous works. However, he criticized the sound for being overly homogenized and lacking authenticity, noting that the group adopted a standardized sound to appeal to a broader market but failed to introduce any significant innovations. He compared the musical aesthetic to that of Brazilian artists such as Rita Lee and Moraes Moreira, arguing that this approach results in something predictable and "risk-free."

Tom Ford, from the U.S. newspaper Toledo Blade, wrote that the album might appeal to a younger audience, such as those who watch Saturday morning cartoons, but anyone over the age of 14 would likely be put off by the group's visual style. He described the songs as "synthetic, danceable, upbeat, and entirely devoid of impact or substance".

== Track listing ==
| No. | Title | Lead vocalist | Length |
|---|---|---|---|
| 1. | "Hold Me" | Robby Rosa | 4:17 |
| 2. | "You And Me All The Way" | Raymond Acevedo | 3:57 |
| 3. | "Come Home" | Charlie Massó and Robby Rosa | 3:39 |
| 4. | "When I Dance With You" (English version of "Yo Seré Tu Bailarín") | Charlie Massó | 3:39 |
| 5. | "Don't Hold Back" | Robby Rosa | 3:24 |
| 6. | "Explosion" | Robby Rosa | 3:54 |
| 7. | "Oh, My Love" (English version of "Rayo De Luna") | Ricky Martin | 3:47 |
| 8. | "Chocolate Candy" (English version of "Sabes A Chocolate") | Robby Rosa | 4:16 |
| 9. | "Transformation" | Roy Rosselló | 3:41 |
| 10. | "Please Be Good To Me" | Robby Rosa | 3:54 |

== Charts ==
Weekly chart for Menudo
| Chart (1985) | Peak position |
|---|---|
| Brazil (Nopem) | 10 |
| United States (Billboard 200) | 100 |
| United States (Billboard Latin Pop Albums) | 19 |
| Puerto Rico (Billboard Top Latin Albums) | 7 |
