= Joselo (disambiguation) =

Joselo (1936–2013) was a Venezuelan actor and comedian.

Joselo may also refer to:

- Joselo Díaz (born 1980), Dominican baseball player
- Joselo Rangel, musician in Café Tacuba
- Joselo Vega (born 1962), Puerto Rican dancer and choreographer
