= Sian Chiong =

Cuban actor

- Born: Sian Chiong Cheruet; October 27, 1993 (age 32); La Habana, Cuba
- Occupation: Actor
- Years active: 2004–present

Sian Chiong Cheruet, known as Sian Chiong (born October 27, 1993) is a Cuban actor and singer.

== Career ==
Chiong was a member of a music group named "Los Angeles". At the end of 2010, they had the opportunity to record an album of their own production, titled Confession. In this album the songs were authored by the members themselves, who also arranged all the songs and had the help of various musicians. Months later, after his debut, his current international label S.P. Latin Records launched the album on the international market in June 2011.

In 2018 he participated in the Mexican telenovela Like playing the role of Alan. He later participated in El corazón nunca se equivoca and Súbete a mi moto.

At the end of 2020 he was an antagonist in the telenovela La mexicana y el güero with Itati Cantoral, Juan Soler, Luis Roberto Guzmán, Nora Salinas, Jacqueline Andere, Patricio Castillo, Julio Camejo, Gala Montes, Iran Castillo and Ferdinando Valencia.

== Filmography ==
Film
Year	Film	Role	Notes
2011	Ni pocos Ni locos	Claudio	Protagonist
Television
Year	Title	Role	Notes
2011–12	Santa María del Porvenir	Alejandro	Supporting role
2018	Like	Alan	Supporting role
2019	El corazón nunca se equivoca	Thiago	Guest appearance
2020	Súbete a mi moto	Joselo Vega	Supporting role
2020–21	La mexicana y el güero	Diego Torres	Supporting role
2022	Corazón guerrero	Adrián Guerrero	Supporting role
2024-25	Las hijas de la señora García	Mateo Giménez	Special appearance
