= Survivor México: La Reliquia en Llamas =

Season of Survivor México

- Season 7
- Presented by: Carlos ″Warrior″ Guerrero
- No. of days: 37
- No. of castaways: 16
- Winner: Avril Andrade
- Runner-up: Sahit Sosa
- No. of episodes: 30

Release
- Original network: Azteco Uno
- Original release: 20 July – 23 August 2026

Season chronology
- ← Previous; Survivor México: Héroes y Villanos

Survivor México: La Reliquia en Llamas (Survivor Mexico: The Relic in Flames) is the seventh season of the Mexican version of Survivor. This season will see Carlos ''Warrior'' Guerrero host for his sixth consecutive season. It will start airing on 20 July 2026. In the end, Avril Andrade won the season by winning the final challenge.

== Contestants ==
The first four participants were announced on 12 July. Those being Julio Camejo, Sahit Sosa, Shada Hernández and Viviann Baeza. The next eight were announced on 13 July. Those being Abel Robles, Anahí Izali, Aurélie Garzonio, Azalia "La Negra" Ojeda, Bobby Larios, Javier Márquez, Rey Grupero and Tzasna Carrasco. The last four players were announced during the first episode. Those being: Avril Andrade, Erick Castro, Sebastian Yate and Sheila Velázquez.

List of Survivor México: La Reliquia en Llamas contestants
Contestant	Original Tribe	Swapped Tribe	Fake merge Tribe	Merged Tribe	Finish	Exile
Azalia "La Negra" Ojeda; Returned to the game	Jaguares				1st eliminated Day 4	Returnee; Day 6
Bobby Larios; 57, Guadalajara; Actor	Halcones				2nd eliminated Day 7	
Erick Castro; 31, Ciudad Nezahualcóyotl; Porter	Halcones				3rd eliminated Day 15	
Rey Grupero; 42, Mexico City; Presenter	Jaguares				4th eliminated Day 18	
Viviann Baeza; 27, Querétaro; Singer	Halcones	Halcones			5th eliminated Day 22	
Sebastian Yate; 31, Mexico City; Actor	Jaguares	Halcones	Amarilla		Quit; Day 27	
Azalia "La Negra" Ojeda; 53, Mexico City; Presenter	Jaguares	Jaguares	Amarilla		6th eliminated Day 28	
Abel Robles; 31, Hermosillo; Influencer	Jaguares	Jaguares	Verde		7th eliminated Day 29	
Aurélie Garzonio; 37, Mexico City; Presenter	Halcones	Halcones	Verde	Merged; Tribe	8th eliminated 1st jury member Day 30	
Sheila Velázquez; 41, Mexico City; Firefighter	Jaguares	Jaguares	Verde	Merged; Tribe	9th eliminated 2nd jury member Day 31	
Javier "Javi" Márquez; 34, Guadalajara; Sports teacher	Halcones	Jaguares	Amarilla	Merged; Tribe	10th eliminated 3rd jury member Day 32	
Anahí Izali; 36, Mexico City; Influencer	Halcones	Halcones	Amarilla	Merged; Tribe	11th eliminated 4th jury member Day 33	
Julio Camejo; 55, Mexico City; Actor	Jaguares	Jaguares	Verde	Merged; Tribe	12th eliminated 5th jury member Day 35	
Shada Hernández; 26, Mexico City; Reality star	Jaguares	Jaguares	Amarilla	Merged; Tribe	13th eliminated 6th jury member Day 35	
Tzasna Carrasco; 35, Papantla; Athlete	Jaguares	Jaguares	Amarilla	Merged; Tribe	14th eliminated Day 36	
Sahit Sosa; 36, Guadalajara; Actor	Halcones	Halcones	Verde	Merged; Tribe	Runner-up; Day 37	
Avril Andrade; 19, Colima; Merchant	Halcones	Halcones	Verde	Merged; Tribe	Sole Survivor; Day 37	

== Season summary ==
Episode		Challenges			Nominated (Vote)	Eliminated	Finish
No.	Original air date	Reward	Tribal Immunity	Individual Immunity	Nominated (Vote)	Eliminated	Finish
1–6	20–24, 26 July, 2026	Jaguares			~~Sheila~~ (Note: Sheila was saved by Tzasna.), La Negra (No vote) (Note: The losers of the Nomination Challenge would be nominated for the Extinction Duel.)	La Negra	Sent to Exile; Day 4
1–6	20–24, 26 July, 2026	Jaguares			Bobby, ~~Erick~~ (Note: Erick was saved by Javi.) (No vote) (Note: The losers of the Nomination Challenge would be nominated for the Extinction Duel.)	La Negra	Sent to Exile; Day 4
1–6	20–24, 26 July, 2026	Jaguares			Bobby, ~~Erick~~ (No vote)	La Negra	Sent to Exile; Day 4
1–6	20–24, 26 July, 2026	Halcones (Note: Combined Immunity/Reward challenge.)			Sheila (7–1)	La Negra	Sent to Exile; Day 4
1–6	20–24, 26 July, 2026	Jaguares		Aurélie	Bobby (5–3)	Bobby	2nd eliminated Day 7
1–6	20–24, 26 July, 2026	Halcones		Aurélie	Bobby (5–3)	Bobby	2nd eliminated Day 7
1–6	20–24, 26 July, 2026	Jaguares (Note: Combined Immunity/Reward challenge.)		Sheila	La Negra (4–4) (Note: Due to a tie, the nominee was chosen through chance.)	Bobby	2nd eliminated Day 7
1–6	20–24, 26 July, 2026	Halcones (Note: Combined Immunity/Reward challenge.)		Sheila	La Negra (4–4)	Bobby	2nd eliminated Day 7
7–12	27–31 July, 2 August, 2026	Halcones		Sebastian	Erick (5–1–1)	Erick	3rd eliminated Day 15
7–12	27–31 July, 2 August, 2026	Halcones		Sebastian	Erick (5–1–1)	Erick	3rd eliminated Day 15
7–12	27–31 July, 2 August, 2026	Halcones		Sebastian	Erick (5–1–1)	Erick	3rd eliminated Day 15
7–12	27–31 July, 2 August, 2026	Jaguares		Sebastian	Erick (5–1–1)	Erick	3rd eliminated Day 15
7–12	27–31 July, 2 August, 2026	Halcones		Sebastian	Erick (5–1–1)	Erick	3rd eliminated Day 15
7–12	27–31 July, 2 August, 2026	Halcones		~~Aurélie~~; Anahí (Note: Anahí stole the necklace from Aurélie, due to an advantage she used.)	Avril (4–1–1–1)	Erick	3rd eliminated Day 15
7–12	27–31 July, 2 August, 2026	Jaguares		~~Aurélie~~; Anahí	Avril (4–1–1–1)	Erick	3rd eliminated Day 15
7–12	27–31 July, 2 August, 2026	Jaguares (Note: Combined Immunity/Reward challenge.)		~~Aurélie~~; Anahí	Avril (4–1–1–1)	Erick	3rd eliminated Day 15
7–12	27–31 July, 2 August, 2026	Jaguares (Note: Combined Immunity/Reward challenge.)		~~Aurélie~~; Anahí	Avril (4–1–1–1)	Erick	3rd eliminated Day 15
13–18	3–7, 9 August, 2026	Halcones		Tzasna	Rey (7–1)	Rey	4th eliminated Day 18
13–18	3–7, 9 August, 2026	Halcones		Tzasna	Rey (7–1)	Rey	4th eliminated Day 18
13–18	3–7, 9 August, 2026	Halcones (Note: Combined Immunity/Reward challenge.)		Javi	Shada (5–3)	Rey	4th eliminated Day 18
13–18	3–7, 9 August, 2026	Halcones (Note: Combined Immunity/Reward challenge.)		Javi	Shada (5–3)	Rey	4th eliminated Day 18
13–18	3–7, 9 August, 2026	Halcones		Sebastian	Abel (4–3)	Viviann	5th eliminated Day 22
13–18	3–7, 9 August, 2026	Halcones (Note: Combined Immunity/Reward challenge.)		Sebastian	Abel (4–3)	Viviann	5th eliminated Day 22
13–18	3–7, 9 August, 2026	Halcones (Note: Although Jaguares won the challenge, Halcones used a Reward Steal to steal the reward.)	Jaguares	Javi	Viviann (3–2–1)	Viviann	5th eliminated Day 22
19–24	10–14, 16 August, 2026	Amarilla		Sahit	Sebastian, Anahí (3–2–1)	Sebastian	Quit; Day 27
19–24	10–14, 16 August, 2026	Amarilla		Sahit	Sebastian, Anahí (3–2–1)	Sebastian	Quit; Day 27
19–24	10–14, 16 August, 2026	Verde		Sahit	Sebastian, Anahí (3–2–1)	Sebastian	Quit; Day 27
19–24	10–14, 16 August, 2026	Amarilla		Sahit	Sebastian, Anahí (3–2–1)	Sebastian	Quit; Day 27
19–24	10–14, 16 August, 2026	Amarilla		Sahit	Sebastian, Anahí (3–2–1)	Sebastian	Quit; Day 27
19–24	10–14, 16 August, 2026	Shada		Sahit	Sebastian, Anahí (3–2–1)	Sebastian	Quit; Day 27
19–24	10–14, 16 August, 2026	Verde (Note: Combined Immunity/Reward challenge.)		Javi	Sebastian, Anahí (3–2–1)	Sebastian	Quit; Day 27
19–24	10–14, 16 August, 2026	Verde (Note: Combined Immunity/Reward challenge.)		Javi	Anahí, La Negra (3–2)	La Negra	6th eliminated Day 28
19–24	10–14, 16 August, 2026	Amarilla (Note: Combined Immunity/Reward challenge.)		Sheila	Aurélie, Abel (3–2–1)	Abel	7th eliminated Day 29
25–30	17–21, 23 August, 2026	Sahit & Avril			Aurélie, Julio (4–2–2)	Aurélie	8th eliminated 1st jury member Day 30
25–30	17–21, 23 August, 2026	[Aurélie & Sheila]		Anahí	Aurélie, Julio (4–2–2)	Aurélie	8th eliminated 1st jury member Day 30
25–30	17–21, 23 August, 2026	Avril			Anahí, Sheila (5–3)	Sheila	9th eliminated 2nd jury member Day 31
25–30	17–21, 23 August, 2026	[Julio & Sahit]			Anahí, Sheila (5–3)	Sheila	9th eliminated 2nd jury member Day 31
25–30	17–21, 23 August, 2026	Julio			Javi, Avril (4–3)	Javi	10th eliminated 3rd jury member Day 32
25–30	17–21, 23 August, 2026	[Shada & Avril]			Javi, Avril (4–3)	Javi	10th eliminated 3rd jury member Day 32
25–30	17–21, 23 August, 2026	Tzasna			Anahí, Julio (3–3)	Anahí	11th eliminated 4th jury member Day 33
25–30	17–21, 23 August, 2026	[Julio & Shada]			Anahí, Julio (3–3)	Anahí	11th eliminated 4th jury member Day 33
25–30	17–21, 23 August, 2026	None				Julio	12th eliminated 5th jury member Day 35
25–30	17–21, 23 August, 2026			Sahit	Avril, Tzasna, Shada (No vote)	Shada	13th eliminated 6th jury member Day 35
25–30	17–21, 23 August, 2026			Avril	Sahit, Tzasna (No vote)	Tzasna	14th eliminated Day 36
25–30	17–21, 23 August, 2026	Final Challenge				Final Challenge	
25–30	17–21, 23 August, 2026	Final Challenge				Sahit	Runner-up; Day 37
25–30	17–21, 23 August, 2026	Final Challenge				Avril	Sole Survivor; Day 37

== Episodes ==
No. overall	No. in season	Title	Timeline	Original release date
402	1	"Episode 1"	Days 1–2	July 20, 2026
The players were split into two groups and rowed their canoe to a ship in the middle of the sea. Once there, they met Warrior, who split them into two tribes. He also announced a new twist: the burning relic. Warrior stated that the person who can bring him all the pieces will get an advantage.: Nomination Challenge: Players must jump from the ship and swim towards eight submerged skeletons. Six of them have a medal around their neck. The six players of each group who retrieve a medal are safe. The two who don't are automatically nominated for the Extinction Duel. Sheila and La Negra didn't manage to retrieve a medal at Jaguares. At Halcones, Bobby and Erick failed and are nominated.; At Halcones, the tribe considers themselves united. At Jaguares, La Negra didn't like that Julio was proclaiming himself as the leader of the tribe. She also dislike the way he played during the challenge by stealing a medal from Sheila and giving it to Shada. La Negra said to Shada that he is being selective and beginning to form a strategy. Julio stated that he had the right to pick up as many medals as he did, due to him being the fastest. He distributed the medals to people he thought would score the most points for the tribe. Both tribes start working on their shelter. At Halcones, the group manages to make a fire with the flint they are supplied with. The next morning at Jaguares, Sebastian stated that Rey and Abel don't do much at camp. At Halcones, Sahit thinks the same about Anahí. Anahí thinks that Sahit is very egocentric during meetings.: Reward Challenge: In each round, three players must knock down a wall made up of blocks with a battering ram. They must then slide the ram through a hole by turning it, so that the handels can get through the opening. Once cleared, they must balance six cubes on the battering ram and cross a balance beam. After that, they must build a tower with all the blocks and place the letter "S" on top of it. If the tower stands for three seconds, then that tribe scores a point. First tribe to score five points wins reward. Jaguares win with a final score of 5–2. They received 500g beans, 1kg rice and 250ml oil.; After the challenge, Warrior tasked the players with voting for the person they trust the most within their tribe. Javi and Tzasna won the vote. Warrior announced that these two players will have to make a big decision the next day.
403	2	"Episode 2"	Days 2–3	July 21, 2026
Back at their camps, the tribes speculate on the decision Javi and Tzasna have to make. At night, Jaguares almost burnt their shelter down. The members of Halcones decided not to sleep in their shelter, due to the animals that could hide inside.: Reward Challenge: In each round, two players will each throw a ball through a basket, which leads to a chute. When the players have thrown their balls into the chute, they must crawl under a series of ropes. At the end of the ropes, they must catch their ball. If they don't catch it, they must restart. Once both players have their ball, they must go through a twisted net. Finally, the duo must throw one ball each on a overhead trough to score a point. First tribe to score five points wins reward. Jaguares won 5–0 and received tools.; After the challenge, Warrior announced that Javi and Tzasna had to save one nominee from their tribe from the Extinction Duel. Tzasna chose Sheila and Javi chose Erick. At Jaguares, Tzasna explained that she saved Sheila, due to being the closest to the medal. At Halcones, Viviann think they lost, due to the lack of communication.: Reward Challenge: In each round, one player from each tribe will slide down a slide into a pool of water. In the middle of the pool is a ring. Players must ring their tribes bell and hold on to the ring simultaneously to score a point. First tribe to score six points wins reward. Jaguares won with a final score of 6–5 and won potatoes.; After the challenge, Avril stated that she didn't like the way Shada played in the last round. Shada accused Avril of not accepting losses. Sahit later said that he also didn't like the way the Jaguares played.
404	3	"Episode 3"	Days 3–4	July 22, 2026
At Halcones, Bobby and Aurélie talk to each other about the difficulty of the show. At Jaguares, Tzasna and Rey think that some members of the tribe are egocentric. At the challenge, Warrior announced that Sheila wouldn't participate in the challenge, due to a finger injury.: Immunity/Reward Challenge: In each round, two players must dig under a bar, avoid posts and go through a corridor. Once they have passed the obstacles, the duo must grab a bag containing balls. After they have their bag, they must go up and over a tower and place a plank to cross to the next obstacle. In the final obstacle, they must place their feet into a plank and walk across using ropes. Then they must use two poles connected to the same platform to raise up two balls, so that these can fall though a hole into a basket. The basket has to be placed correctly. A tribe scores a point when both balls have fallen into the basket. First tribe to score five points wins immunity and reward. Halcones won their first challenge with a final score of 5–4. They received muffins as a bonus.; At Halcones, the tribe discovers that their shelter has collapsed. At Jaguares, La Negra is mad about Sheila lying about Julio. As it turned out, Sheila didn't obtain the medal, instead of Julio not giving it to her. Tzasna regretted saving her from the Extinction Duel. At Tribal Council, Warrior announced that the advantage of the flaming relic will be for the person who can show him the five pieces at the right time. La Negra expresses her disappointment in Sheila. Sheila did end up revealing that she lied about the incident. Shada thinks Sheila deceived Tzasna. Sheila was nominated by a 7–1 vote.: Extinction Duel: Nominees must build a fire high enough to burn a rope. First two people who burn their rope are saved. Bobby and Sheila won, eliminating La Negra from Survivor México.; After her torch was snuffed, La Negra headed to a secret camp.
405	4	"Episode 4"	Day 5	July 23, 2026
La Negra discovered her camp. She read a note that stated that she has to complete a mission to return to the game. The next morning at Jaguares, Rey stated that he doesn't trust Sheila. Rey has also stated that he wanted Sheila eliminated. At the opening ceremony of the challenge, Rey became angry at Sahit, due to discussing their tribe members.: Reward Challenge: In each round, there will be a caller and a blindfolded person. The caller must guide the blindfolded player through an obstacle course. The player who runs the course must collect flags along the way. At the end, they must use a stick to spin a bag containing a key off a coil. With the key, they must open a chest and raise the flag inside to score a point. First tribe to five points wins reward. Jaguares won ten eggs with a final score of 5–3.; After the challenge, Erick faced backlash, due to his comments towards Anahí during the challenge.: Exile Challenge: La Negra had to complete a flame puzzle within the time to return to the game. She completed the challenge.; At Jaguares, Rey flat out said to Sheila that he can't stand her. Sheila told him she doesn't care.: Reward Challenge: In each round, three players will try to knock down barrels with a heavy ball. First tribe to knock down three barrels scores a point. First tribe to score three points wins reward. Halcones won with a final score of 3–1. They have the possibility to send two players to the Survivor Market.; During the challenge, Sebastian was sent to hospital, due to a heat stroke. Halcones sent Sahit and Viviann to the market with eleven coins. Anahí stated that she doesn't trust Sahit, due to thinking that he would buy a clue to an Idol or a piece of the relic.
406	5	"Episode 5"	Days 5–6	July 24, 2026
Sahit and Viviann head to the market. Among rice and beans, the duo decides to buy a piece of the relic. They decide to keep it a secret between them. The next day, Sahit buries the piece at their camp. He thinks Anahí would steal it. At Jaguares, Sebastian returns to the tribe after a night in the hospital. Rey and Sebastian think Julio is a threat.: Individual Immunity Challenge: Players must balance a ball on a platform, whilst standing on a sloping balance beam. At regular intervals, players will go further down the beam to a smaller surface. Last person standing wins Individual Immunity. Aurélie won within Halcones and Sheila won within Jaguares.; At Halcones, Sahit, Viviann, Avril and Aurélie made a pact to not nominate each other. At Jaguares, Shada want to nominate Julio, due to his ego. At the opening ceremony of the challenge, La Negra returned to her tribe.: Immunity/Reward Challenge: In each round, one person will take place in a wheel, the other two will push it. The wheel must be pushed through a pool of water and speed bumps, while roadblocks had to be removed. At the end of the course, the player in the wheel must get out of it and solve a sliding puzzle to arrange the numbers correctly. First person to solve it scores a point. First tribe to score five points wins Immunity and reward. Jaguares won with a final score of 5–1 and received oatmeal cookies and a bonus reward.; At Jaguares, La Negra stated that she will nominate the players who are good at the challenges. She wants Julio out first, then Abel and Rey. At Halcones, Anahí and Bobby discuss on how to break the alliance of Sahit, Viviann, Avril and Aurélie. At Tribal Council, Javier stated that it bothered him that Abel intervened with his discussion with Rey. Warrior announced that the person who brings the five pieces of the relic will be immune until the final five of the game. Bobby was nominated in a 5–3 vote.
407	6	"Episode 6"	Day 7	July 26, 2026
At Halcones, Anahí tells Sahit that she wants to work with him. Sahit has his doubts. He thinks Anahí is the villain of the tribe. Viviann, Avril and Aurélie tell Sahit that Anahí has told them to vote for Sahit. Viviann assures the group that she is going to talk with Erick about voting for Anahí. At Jaguares, Rey, Abel and Julio think that La Negra is causing discord within the tribe.: Immunity/Reward Challenge: In each round, two players must transport a heavy sack. First they will get in a boat. Afterwards, they go through an obstacle, over a ramp and then through a final obstacle. Along the way, they must also retrieve a bag containing balls. At the end, the heavy sack must be placed in a basket to release a gate. Finally, two balls must be launched into a basket by using a platform and ropes. First tribe to score five points wins Immunity and reward. Halcones won with a final score of 5–2. The tribe received rice pudding next as a bonus.; At Jaguares, Rey pointed out to Sheila that La Negra was causing conflict within the tribe. Sheila told Rey that she wants to vote for Julio. Tzasna wants to vote for Julio, due to his performance in challenges. Rey tells La Negra that he is orchestrating her nomination. Sebastian also told La Negra that a group of people want to vote for her. At Tribal Council, a tie between La Negra and Julio occurred. Both had to smash a vessel with an axe. If the vessel spills water, they are safe. If the vessel spills a red liquid, they are nominated. La Negra was nominated. Julio thought it was weird people voted for him, due to the fact that he thought the tribe was going to vote based on challenge performance. Julio argued with Tzasna and La Negra about honour, which continued after the Tribal Council.: Extinction Duel: Nominees must build a tower on an unstable table connected to a rope. They must bring the blocks one-by-one and place them on said table. The first person to stacks ten blocks is safe. La Negra won, eliminating Bobby from Survivor México.; For winning the duel, Warrior awarded a piece of the relic to La Negra.
408	7	"Episode 7"	Day 8	July 27, 2026
At Jaguares, Julio steals La Negra's piece of the relic. Julio was sent to a dentist after breaking his tooth on a piece of coconut. At Halcones, Anahí talks with Javi about strategizing with the other tribe. At Jaguares, La Negra discovers that her piece has been stolen. She accuses Shada, Abel and Julio. At Halcones, Sahit reveals he took a decoration from the Immunity Idol to give to the other tribe as a fake resurrection totem. He and Viviann want to negotiate for the piece of La Negra. At Jaguares, Julio returns and is confronted by La Negra about the relic piece. She accuses him of being machiavellian. At the opening ceremony of the challenge, Warrior tasked each tribe with voting for a tribe captain. Halcones voted for Javi. Abel became the captain of Jaguares by chance, due to a tie between him and Tzasna.: Reward Challenge: In each round, two players will head up a ramp, whilst going under a net. The duo must also move planks to cross a gap. After they have passed the obstacles, they must move two cubes, so that a third person can collect two bags containing balls. Once the bags have been collected, they must cross one last balancing obstacle to head to their final portion of the challenge. There they must lead a ball along a snake shaped path with ropes. Once the balls has entered the hole at the end, then that tribe scores a point. First tribe to score three points wins reward. Halcones won the challenge with a final score of 3–0. They won rice, oil, beans and onions.; During the challenge, Anahí and Javi were talking with members of Jaguares about voting for Rey. After the challenge at the bench of Jaguares, Julio argued with Tzasna and Sebastian about his gameplay. The latter walked away from the challenge site. At Halcones, Viviann and Avril are tired of the behaviour of Anahí. At Jaguares, the tribe speculates on what is going to happen with Sebastian. Sebastian returned to his tribe at the opening ceremony of the second Reward Challenge. Julio admitted to La Negra that he stole her piece. Warrior announced that at each camp, a Hidden Immunity Idol is present.: Reward Challenge: In each round, two players will have their backs tied together. The duo must pass a corridor, balance beams and some bars to reach their final portion of the challenge. There they must build a tower with bases and balls by using a stick. The first tribe to build a tower that stands for three seconds scores a point. First tribe to score three points wins reward. Halcones won with a final score of 3–2. They received cheese empanadas.
409	8	"Episode 8"	Day 10	July 28, 2026
The players tried to find the Hidden Immunity Idol. Sebastian finds it at Jaguares. At Halcones, Erick found a fake Idol inside the tribes supply chest, which was planted by Sahit. Sahit reveals to Aurélie and Avril that his Idol is fake. He also stated that he wanted Anahí to find the Idol. At Jaguares, Sebastian reveals to La Negra that he found the Idol. Julio suspects that someone on the tribe has already found it, due to them being to calm. At the opening ceremony of the challenge, Warrior tasked the tribes with voting for their weakest member. Halcones chose Anahí and Jaguares chose Sebastian.: Reward Challenge: In each round, three players will be tied toghether by the waist and have to complete an obstacle course. They must cross a pool of water with a raft, climb across a wall, go through the bars, go through the ropes, cross a balance beam and go under a net whilst being in a mud pool. Once they have completed the course, they must make balls with mud and hay to knock down three targets to score a point. First tribe to score three points wins reward. Halcones won with a final score of 3–2. They fecieved a fishing kit.; At Halcones, Anahí became angry with Viviann, due to her allegedly talking bad about her family.: Reward Challenge: In each round, two players must go under a series of cylinders, climb up and over a wall, cross unstable footholds and go over some bars. Once they have completed the course, they have to stack cubes at the end of a seesaw, whilst standing on the same seesaw. The tribe scores a point when the seesaw with the players and blocks doesn't touch the ground for three seconds. First tribe to score four points wins reward. Jaguares won with a final score of 4–3. They received a whole chicken.; After the challenge, Warrior sent Anahí and Sebastian to the jungle for a mission. Both were given a choice. They could pick lentils for the tribe or a club sandwich and an advantage for themselves.
410	9	"Episode 9"	Day 10–11	July 29, 2026
Anahí and Sebastian chose the club sandwich with the advantage. With the advantage, both were able to steal the Individual Immunity necklace from the person who won it. Both players agreed to tell no one. Back at their tribes, both told they were offered to swap tribes. At Jaguares, Rey talks with Sebastian about La Negra hindering the tribe. He tells that to Tzasna. Sebastian also stated he want target Abel, due to his poor challenge performance. At Halcones, Viviann thinks Anahí lied about a tribe swap. The tribe agreed to nominate her at the next Tribal Council. At Jaguares, Julio proposes to eliminate Sheila first and then make a male alliance. Abel breaks his alliance with Julio, due to him stealing a piece of the relic from La Negra. Julio later said he doesn't know where it is.: Reward Challenge: In each round, two players will race into the jungle to retrieve a snake. With said snake, they must complete an obstacle course consisting of ropes and bars. Once they have completed the course, they must use ropes to move three balls to the center of a board, where they will drop inside a hole. A tribe scores a point when all three balls have dropped in the hole. First tribe to score seven points wins reward. Halcones won with a final score of 7–5. They won enchiladas.; After the challenge, Warrior asked Javi and Abel to send one player from their tribe to the deliberation cabin. Sahit and Shada were sent. They had to negotiate for pasta, eggs, a lamp and a special medallion. Sahit wants to give his fake resurrection totem to Shada, which she declines. Shada proposed to receive the food, so that the Halcones can lose and nominate Anahí. Sahit wants Jaguares to lose first, so that they can send Julio. In the end, Shada left with the eggs and pasta. Sahit left with the medallion and the lamp. The medallion turned out to be a Reward Steal.
411	10	"Episode 10"	Days 11–G12	July 30, 2026
At Jaguares, Shada tells the tribe what happened at the delibertion cabin. Sahit does the same at Halcones, but Anahí doesn't buy it. The next day at Jaguares, Sebastian wants to trick Julio into believing the tribe has a resurrection medallion. At Halcones, Erick hides his "idol", fearing Anahí will steal it.: Reward Challenge: In each round, three players will go through a net tunnel. They must then empty water buckets into a chute, so that a container gets filled. When there is enough water in the container, players must then transport a ball, which is placed on a platform. Players will hold ropes to stabilize the platform. After the ball is transported through an obstacle course consisting of bars and a balance beam, they must use a plank to roll the balls into their spots. The tribe scores a point when three balls are in their spots. First tribe to score three points wins reward. Halcones won with a final score of 3–2. They won corn, tomatoes and chili powder.; At Jaguares, Sheila and Tzasna discuss Julio's behaviour during the challenge.: Reward Challenge: In each round, one player from each tribe will be connected to the other player via a rope. They must move forward to grab their flag and to score a point. First tribe to score five points wins reward. Jaguares won with a final score of 5–4. They won hot dogs.
412	11	"Episode 11"	Day 13	July 31, 2026
At Halcones, Avril and Aurélie don't want Anahí to win Individual Immunity. Aurélie finds it sad that Erick has a fake idol. She also doesn't trust Shada.: Individual Immunity Challenge: Players must transport five totems one-by-one through a short obstacle course, consisting of a tripwire and a net. Once all totems are transported, they must use a pole to stack the totems on a bar, which is balanced by the players foot. First player who has all their totems stacked for three seconds wins Individual Immunity. Sebastian wins within Jaguares and Aurélie won within Halcones.; After the challenge, Sheila tells Javi not to trust Sahit. At Halcones, Anahí confronts Sahit, who was talking with Shada. Sahit stated that his second option for nomination would be Javi, due to him being likely to eliminate Julio in a duel. At Jaguares, Shada stated that she wouldn't throw the challenge.: Immunity/Reward Challenge: In each round, two players will move a cart with another player on it through a course. The player on the cart must collect bags containing sandbags. Along the way, the pushers must put sacks in a net to act as a counterweight to remove the bar blocking the way. At the end of the course, the player on the cart must throw a sandbag on three platforms to score a point. First tribe to score five points wins Immunity and reward. Jaguares won the challenge with a final score of 5–3. They received donuts and coffee as a reward.; After the challenge, Shada tells the Halcones about the fake resurrection medallion. At Halcones, Sahit refuses to explain himself, due to the presence of Anahí. Sahit later tells that the resurrection medallion and Erick's "idol" were fake. At Tribal Council, Shada revealed the plan of losing Immunity on purpose. Anahí used her advantage to steal the Immunity necklace of Aurélie. Erick was nominated in a 5–1–1 vote.
413	12	"Episode 12"	Days 14–15	August 2, 2026
At Halcones, Anahí thinks that the tribe would nominate Javi if they lost the challenge. Javi and Sahit reasured their trust in each other. Anahí became fed up with her tribe not giving her food.: Immunity/Reward Challenge: In each round, two players must complete an obstacle course, while carrying four balls. First they must poke the balls out of a net with a pole. They must then pass the obstacles until they can put the balls up a chute. They must then open a chest to retrieve a ball inside a net. The duo must attach the ball to a rope and use it to knock down three totems into their respective baskets to score a point. First tribe to score five points wins Immunity and reward. Jaguares won with a final score of 5–2. They received churros as a bonus.; After the challenge, Javi blamed Anahí for the loss. At Halcones, Sahit is fed up with Anahí distancing herself from the tribe. At Jaguares, Abel told Shada that he will defend her from the rest of the tribe. At Tribal Council, Avril was nominated in a 4–1–1–1 vote.: Extinction Duel: Nominees must transport four balls over a balance beam by using balancing them on a platform. With those balls, they must use ropes to roll and drop them into four different nets. First player who manages to have their balls in the nets stays in the game. Avril won against Erick, sending him home.; Avril received a piece of the relic.
414	13	"Episode 13"	Day 16	August 3, 2026
At Jaguares, Sebastian wants to go after Abel and Rey. Rey found it weird that Halcones voted for players with good challenge performance. At Halcones, Aurélie stated that she didn't like Erick leaving. Avril decideds to bury her piece of the relic. At the opening ceremony, the tribes had to vote for who would become the captain of their tribe. Javi and Sebastian won the vote. Warrior announced that two players will be eliminated in the third week.: Reward Challenge: In each round, four players must go up and over a ramp, cross two balancing obstacles and go under a net. Then they must use ropes to elevate a totem to hook it and score a point. First tribe to score three points wins reward. Halcones won the challenge with a final score of 3–2. They won tomatoes, potatoes, onions, garlic, pasta, coffee, parsley and cilantro.; During the challenge, Anahí talked to Sebastian to maybe give her the necklace stealing advantage. At Jaguares, Rey wants to nominate people based on challenge performance.: Reward Challenge: In each round, one player from each tribe will be blindfolded, strapped with bells and have a flag on their backs. The objective is to grab the flag from the others back to score a point. First tribe to score five points wins reward. Halcones won the challenge with a final score of 5–2. They won three pizzas.; After the challenge, Warrior announced that in the fourth week, the tribes would merge.
415	14	"Episode 14"	Days 16–17	August 4, 2026
During the night at Halcones, Anahí distanced herself from the tribe. Javi wants to win the Immunity Challenges, so that the tribe would be leveled at merge. Aurélie, Javi and Avril want to get Anahí out, fearing she would strategize with players of the opposing tribe. The trio wants to start talking with some Jaguares members to combat this. At Jaguares, La Negra wanted to vote for Rey to mess up the alliance between him, Julio and Abel. At the opening ceremony, Warrior tasked the captains with picking someone from the opposing tribe not to compete in the challenge. Javi picked Sebastian and Sebastian picked Aurélie. Anahí revealed that Sebastian has an Immunity stealing advantage. Sebastian then said that she wanted his advantage.: Individual Immunity Challenge: Players must stand on a cube, whilst holding ropes that is connected to a track that is weighted on one side. A ball is placed on the track. At regular intervals, players must step on a smaller cube. Last person standing with their ball on the track wins Individual Immunity. Tzasna wins within Jaguares and Javi wins within Halcones.; At Jaguares, Shada thinks that Anahí wants to disbalance the tribe.: Immunity/Reward Challenge: In each round, one person will balance on a giant spool, with the other player rolling it. The player on the spool must collect bags containing pieces. With the pieces, they must use a long pole to push them up a slope. The tribe scores a point when two pieces are on top of the slope. First tribe to score five points wins Immunity and reward. Halcones won the challenge with a final score of 5–3. As a bonus, the tribe received croissants and coffee.; At Jaguares, Abel and Julio assure each other that they don't have a piece of the relic. At Tribal Council, Rey is nominated by a 7–1 vote.
416	15	"Episode 15"	Day 18	August 5, 2026
At Jaguares, Rey thinks Sheila is leading the tribe. Shada thinks Sheila should face against Rey in the duel, due to her thinking she is better than him. At Halcones, Viviann and Sahit discussed being sent to win a piece of the relic. Anahí asked Aurélie to vote for her at Tribal Council to also obtain a piece.: Immunity/Reward Challenge: In each round, two players must push a heavy slingslot-structure through a path, while collecting balls along the way. At the end, the players must knock down four totems with the slingshot to score a point. First tribe to score five points wins Immunity and reward. Halcones won the challenge with a final score of 5–2. As a bonus reward, the tribe received chicken burritos, soft drinks and hot sauce.; At Jaguares, Julio thought the tribe didn't give it their all. Sebastian promised the women that if Julio won Individual Immunity, he would give them his stealing advantage. Shada thinks Abel would betray the tribe at merge. At Tribal Council, Shada was nominated by a 5–3 vote.: Extinction Duel: Nominees must transport four balls by placing it on a platform connected to a long pole. They must move the pole along a track. Once all four balls are transported, they must roll the balls up a slope. First nominee to have two balls up their slope stays in the game. Shada won, sending Rey home.; Shada won a piece of the relic. She gave it to La Negra.
417	16	"Episode 16"	Day 19	August 6, 2026
At Jaguares, La Negra said to Julio that he is more useful in the merge than Abel. Tzasna buried La Negra's piece of the relic. La Negra wants to strategize with Halcones eliminate Julio out at merge. At Halcones, the tribe calls Shada the rotten fruit of Jaguares.: Reward Challenge: In each round, one player will stand on a raft, while the other player must get the raft to shore by spinning a wheel. The player on the raft must collect bags containing coconuts. At shore, the players must knock down three sets of two totems by bouncing them against a trampoline to score a point. First tribe to score seven points wins reward. Halcones won the challenge with a final score of 7–6. They received a ride on a catamaran.; After the challenge, Javi and Sebastian were sent to the deliberation cabin. They had to swap one member from their tribe to the other tribe. Sebastian wanted Anahí, but Javi thought he would form an alliance with her. Both captains failed to reach an agreement and thus had to swap tribes themselves.
418	17	"Episode 17"	Days 19–20	August 7, 2026
At Jaguares, Javi stated he would give it his all for his new tribe. Tzasna digs up the relic piece and gives it to Shada, who then reburies it. At Halcones, Sebastian tells the tribe about the cabin. Aurélie thinks Anahí is desperate. At Jaguares, La Negra found the fake resurrection totem of Sahit, which she kept.: Individual Immunity Challenge: Players must hold on to a bar behind them while standing on a inclined platform. The bar is connected to a rope. At regular intervals, the rope is made longer. Last person standing on each tribe wins Individual Immunity. Sebastian wins within Halcones and Javi wins within Jaguares.; La Negra was sent to the medic, due to a knee injury.: Immunity/Reward Challenge: In each round, two players have to go down a slide. After that, they have to attach themselves to a barrel. They must go under a net, over a balance beam and through a passage whilst collecting bags containing metal bars along the way. At the end, the bars have to be fished out by using a hook to score a point. First tribe to score five points wins Immunity and reward. Halcones won the challenge with a final score of 5–1. As a bonus, the tribe received carrot cake and a soft drink.; At Jaguares, Shada wants to vote for Julio or Abel with the women. She also revealed that she couldn't stand Sheila anymore. La Negra wants Javi to join her alliance. At Tribal Council, Abel was nominated by a 4–3 vote. After Tribal Council, Abel became angry with Shada, due to her voting for him.
419	18	"Episode 18"	Days 21–22	August 9, 2026
At Jaguares, Abel stated he didn't expect Shada voting for him, due to swearing loyalty to each other. La Negra wants Julio to eliminate Abel. At Halcones, Anahí tries to look for Erick's fake idol. At Jaguares, Tzasna, La Negra and Sheila try to look for Sebastian's Hidden Immunity Idol, which he left behind at his old camp. Tzasna found it and wanted to give it to La Negra. During the night, Tzasna received a phone call about her father passing away. She left the camp. The next day at Halcones, Sahit stated he didn't like how Sebastian and Anahí were cooking during the night.: Immunity/Reward Challenge: In each round, two players will throw sandbags towards each other. Once the sandbags are caught, they must go through a tunnel and throw two sandbags onto a three meter long pole to score a point. First tribe to score five points wins Immunity and reward. Jaguares won the challenge with a final score of 5–2. They received spaghetti and soft drinks as a bonus.; After the challenge, Sahit used his reward steal to steal the spaghetti and soft drinks from Jaguares. At Jaguares, the tribe complains about Sahit. At Halcones, Sebastian tries to get people to vote for Viviann, because she has poor performance in the challenges. At Tribal Council, Tzasna confirmed that she won't be quitting the game. Viviann was nominated by a 3–2–1 vote.: Extinction Duel: Nominees must untangle a rope to release a key. The key opens a chest containing a hook. With said hook, they must retrieve a box containing balls. They must use the balls for a table maze. First player to have two balls at the finish of the maze is safe. Abel won, eliminating Viviann.; Abel received the final piece of the relic.
420	19	"Episode 19"	Days 23–24	August 10, 2026
At Halcones, Sahit found the Hidden Immunity Idol. The tribes left their islands for the final time. The players took a shower and wore new clothes. The group then finally came together. Warrior then showed up and announced that the players would sleep comfortably for the night and receive a buffet. At the buffet, Warrior asked the players about the relic. He announced that one player will obtain all the pieces the same evening. He announced that Sahit, Avril, Shada and Abel would play in a challenge to earn all the pieces and thus be immune until the final five.: Relic Challenge: Players must roll a ball up a chute. As the ball is rolling, they must place blocks. They must catch the ball, so that it doesn't knock over the blocks. The winner will be the player whose final block falls into a basket when the ball knock the blocks over. Sahit won the challenge and received Immunity until the final five.; After the challenge, the players received a party. At the challenge the next day, Warrior announced that three players will leave during the week. He also tasked the players to blindly pick a stone from a bag. La Negra and Aurélie picked white stones and became tribe captains.: Reward Challenge: In each round, two players will have to carry a ladder through an obstacle course. They must place the ladder at a wall to climb up and go down a net. They must then free a disc from a pole by moving it through pegs. Finally, they must place tiles to cover numbers, except for a indicated number. First tribe to place the tiles correctly, so that the indicated number is visible scores a point. First tribe to score five points wins reward. Amarilla won the challenge with a final score of 5–1. They received beaguettes, flour, hazelnut creme, spices, avocados, rice, oil, chickpeas and beans.
421	20	"Episode 20"	Days 24–25	August 11, 2026
After the challenge, both tribes headed to their new shared island. Aurélie doesn't like how Anahí is behaving. Sebastian and Avril want to bond with Anahí, due to being better at the challenges. Tzasna decided not to give Sebastian the Idol, but to La Negra. During the night, Sebastian takes back his Idol and gave it to Aurélie. La Negra told the tribe that Aurélie said she wanted to face Javi and Julio in the Extinction Duel. La Negra talks with Shada and Tzasna about potentially voting for people who perceive themselves as strong.: Reward Challenge: In each round, two players will complete an obstacle course, while balancing a ball on a S-shaped piece of wood. At the end of the course, they will hand the piece of wood to a third person, who will try to roll a ball across the shape. The third person must aim, so that the ball rolls into a hole. First tribe to have their ball in the hole scores a point. First tribe to score three points wins reward. Amarillas won the challenge with a final score of 3–2. They won three pillows, a hammock, milk and brownies.; Sahit stated that he wouldn't have a problem with sending Javi or Julio. Sebastian reveals to Shada that he had broken his alliance with Tzasna. La Negra wants to unite the women to eliminate the men.: Reward Challenge: In each round, one player will be in a swing, while another player will push them. The person on the swing must throw three balls in total into holes of a board to score a point. First tribe to score five points wins reward. Verde won the challenge with a final score of 5–3. They won quesabirrias and hibiscus tea.
422	21	"Episode 21"	Days 25–26	August 12, 2026
Anahí thinks La Negra is trying to manipulate Sebastian and Tzasna. Sebastian told Anahí that he doesn't trust La Negra anymore. Sebastian talks with Tzasna to potentially eliminate La Negra.: Reward Challenge: In each round, two players must complete an obstacle course, while collecting sandbags by poking a net. At te end of the course, one player must throw the sandbags into a basket to open a chest. The chest contains a key, which opens a board. At the board, the other player has to slide numbered pieces to their correct spots to score a point. First tribe to score three points wins reward. Amarilla won the challenge with a final score of 3–2. They won lasagne and soft drinks.; Reward Challenge: In each round, one player from each tribe would face-off in a ring. Both would be holding a platform with a totem on it. The objective is to knock down the opponents totem two times to score a point. First tribe to score five points wins reward. Amarilla won the challenge with a final score of 5–2. They won milanesas and soft drinks.; After the challenge, Warrior tasked each tribe to assign the most persuasive tribe member for a challenge. Shada was picked within Amarilla and Julio within Verde.: Individual Reward Challenge: There are two boxes. One contains an advantage, while the other is empty. One person may look inside their box. The other player has the final say on the box they want. The advantage goes to the person who has the box containing it in front of them. Shada received the advantage. She received an Idol Nullifier.; Shada told everyone that she received a Reward Steal.
423	22	"Episode 22"	Days 26–27	August 13, 2026
Aurélie and Julio discuss on who to vote on if their tribe loses. Aurélie shows Sahit the Hidden Immunity Idol of Sebastian. Sahit wants her to play it on La Negra. The next day, Shada tells Sahit that she wants to eliminate Abel or Julio, but Sahit doesn't trust her.: Immunity/Reward Challenge: In each round, two players from each tribe must jump from a high to grab a buoy. They must then hold the buoys with two sticks while crossing a balance beam. After completing the rest of the course, the duo must drop both buoys onto a rod to score a point. First tribe to score five points wins Immunity and reward. Verde won the challenge with final score of 5–4. As a extra prize, they received chicken wings, fries and soft drinks.; After the challenge, Warrior announced that the Amarilla tribe would have to play an Individual Immunity Challenge.: Individual Immunity Challenge: Players must balance two balls on a platform, whilst going up a pyramid at regular intervals. Last player standing wins Individual Immunity. Javi won the challenge.; Shada didn't like him winning Immunity. She wants to target La Negra and Sebastian. Aurélie said to Sebastian that she lost his Idol, which he didn't like. At Tribal Council, Sebastian and Anahí were nominated by a 3–2–1 vote.: Extinction Duel: Nominees must build a tower with tiles on one end of an unstable plank. They must balance the plank by pulling on a ring with their other arm. First player who completes their tower is safe. Sebastian decided to quit the challenge, eliminating him from the game.
424	23	"Episode 23"	Day 28	August 14, 2026
Sahit thinks that Sebastians departure benefits his tribe, due to seing him as a strong competitor. Anahí felt blindsided with her nomination. Avril and Abel start to become closer. Aurélie and Sahit start discussing who to nominate. They targeted Abel, Avril and Sheila. Aurélie doesn't get why Shada doesn't want to nominate stronger players. Sahit stated that he would betray Tzasna to get Javi out.: Immunity/Reward Challenge: In each round, two players must carry a cart through a course. Along the way, they must tip buckets so that the balls inside will fall into the cart. At the end of the course, they must roll their balls in three holes to score a point. First tribe to score five points wins Immunity and reward. Verde won the challenge with a final score of 5–3. They won burgers, fries and soft drinks as a bonus reward.; Individual Immunity Challenge: Players must stack pieces of wood on a pole at regular intervals. If a piece falls, then they are out. Last player standing with their pieces on the pole wins Individual Immunity. Javi won the challenge.; Javi thinks that the tribe lost, due to Sebastians absence. Aurélie and Sahit wants to save La Negra at Tribal Council. She offers her Immunity Idol to La Negra, which she accepts. Shada has her suspicions about La Negra. Anahí tells Shada to use her Idol Nullifier. At Tribal Council, La Negra doesn't use her Hidden Immunity Idol. Anahí and La Negra are nominated by a 3–2 vote.: Extinction Duel: Nominees must transport two balls through a grid by only using their hands. They must then use a long pole to elevate a ball and drop it through a chute. If the ball lands in a water bucket, they have won the duel. Anahí won the challenge. La Negra is eliminated.
425	24	"Episode 24"	Day 29	August 16, 2026
Shada reveals to Aurélie that she told La Negra about her Idol Nullifier. Aurélie reveals to Shada that she feels used by Sahit. Sahit wants to eliminate either Abel or Julio.: Immunity/Reward Challenge: In each round, two players will transport a ball on a platform, which must be held by ropes. They must go over a balancing course. At the end, one person will roll the ball down a chute and onto a pole. The duos must also transport the ball via the poles to roll down another chute to release a bag containing balls. With those balls, they must roll the balls out of the maze through an exit. There are many different exits, Warrior announces in each round which one they must use. The first tribe to have all their balls through the exit scores a point. First tribe to score five points wins Immunity and reward. Amarilla won the challenge with a final score of 5–3. They won pazole and tamarindo as a reward.; Individual Immunity Challenge: Players must use their legs to hold up a cube against a pole. Last player sitting with their cube wins Individual Immunity. Sheila won the challenge.; Sahit and Shada discuss the nominations. Sahit wanted to give his Hidden Immunity Idol to Aurélie. Shada and Sahit were going around polling the vote. Shada gave her Idol Nullifier to Julio. At Tribal Council, Warrior announced that it will be the last chance to use any advantages. Aurélie wanted to use a Hidden Immunity Idol, which was given to her by Sahit, but Julio blocked it with the Idol Nullifier. Aurélie and Abel were nominated by a 3–2–1 vote.: Extinction Duel: Nominees must firstly move pieces on a board, so that they are divided by colour. They must then follow a rope through an obstacle course. Once they completed the course, they must complete a puzzle that shows the word "Survivor" to stay in the game. Aurélie won, eliminating Abel from the game.
426	25	"Episode 25"	Day 30	August 17, 2026
During the night, Sheila was stung by a wasp and received medical attention. Anahí wants to form an alliance with Tzasna. At the challenge, Warrior tasked the players to pair up. Anahí, who didn't manage to get a partner, received safety without power.: Immunity/Reward Challenge: There will be two challenges.; Challenge 1: In each round, pairs must go under a net and use blocks to cross a stretch of sand, without touching the ground. They must then transport a ball by first clenching it between ropes and then using poles. Once the ball has reached the end, they must construct a tower using crosses and poles to place the crosses. The pair that has their tower standing for three seconds qualifies for the second challenge. The pairs Sahit-Avril and Shada-Julio qualified.; Challenge 2: Pairs must hold up a bar via a rope to place blocks. Once the blocks are placed, they can topple them to create a domino effect. First pair to create a domino effect wins Immunity and a picnic. The pair of Sahit-Avril won the challenge. They invited Aurélie and Sheila to the reward.; At Tribal Council, Aurélie was nominated by a 4–2–2 vote. Julio was nominated through chance, due to the vote tying with Javi.: Extinction Duel: Nominees had to construct a tower with tiles. The player who reaches the designated mark first stays in the game. Julio won, eliminating Aurélie from Survivor México. She became the first member of the jury.
427	26	"Episode 26"	Day 31	August 18, 2026
Shada wants to target Sheila for elimination. Sahit tells Sheila that he thinks the group is going to vote for her. Sahit talks with Sheila and Avril to vote out Shada or Anahí. They went for Anahí. Sahit wants to make Shada believe that they are going to vote for her.: Immunity/Reward Challenge: There will be two challenges.; Challenge 1: There will be multiple stages with people eliminated after each stage. Three rounds will be played, whereby the winners will qualify for the second challenge.; Stage 1: Swing two rings onto hooks.; Stage 2: Carry bags filled with tiles over a balance beam and construct a pyramid with said tiles.; Stage 3: Cross a balance beam with puzzle planks. Build a staircase with these planks to go over an a-frame.; Stage 4: Move a board around, so that all of the colours are divided and in the same tunnel.; Stage 5: Transport a ball through a labyrinth by moving it on a pole.; Julio, Sheila and Avril qualified for the second challenge.: Challenge 2: Players must stand on narrow footholds inside a frame. At regular intervals, they must move to smaller footholds. Last player standing wins Immunity and reward. Avril won the challenge. She received a day at the spa and a pasta buffet. She invited Julio and Sahit.; Avril, Julio and Sahit received their reward. Shada assures Julio that Sheila is going to be blindsided. At Tribal Council, Anahí and Sheila were nominated by a 5–3 vote.: Extinction Duel: Nominees must place five balls on an unstable platform. They must stabelize it with a rope. First player to place all their balls on their platform stays in the game. Anahí won the challenge. Sheila lost and was sent to the jury.
428	27	"Episode 27"	Day 32	August 19, 2026
Sahit wants to make the tribe believe that he and Avril are going to vote for Tzasna, so that they can blindside Anahí.: Immunity/Reward Challenge: There will be two challenges.; Challenge 1: There will be multiple stages with people eliminated after each stage. Three rounds will be played, whereby the winners will qualify for the second challenge.; Stage 1: Transport three balls over a seesaw and under a net, by balancing them on a platform.; Stage 2: Pass a high stepping obstacle, while transporting a ball on a tall pole.; Stage 3: Transport discs on a tall pole, while going under an obstacle, whilst the pole has to stay above the structure. They must then go over a high stepping obstacle.; Stage 4: Get a bag containing discs off a pole. Then arrange the discs on the board by colour.; Stage 5: Push two balls up a slope with pitfalls.; Julio, Tzasna and Avril qualified for the second challenge.: Challenge 2: Construct a tower, whilst standing on a wobbly platform and holding a rope to stabelize the platform. First player to achieve this wins Immunity and reward. Julio won the challenge. He received a feast of pizzas, hot dogs, soft drinks and candy. Julio invited Shada and Avril to the reward.; At Tribal Council, Javi and Avril were nominated by a 4–3 vote.: Extinction Duel: Nominees have to stand on rods. These rods are placed in a board. Each rod is numbered. At regular intervals, Warrior announced the number of the rod that will be removed. The first player to fall will leave the game. Avril won and Javi was sent to the jury.
429	28	"Episode 28"	Day 33	August 20, 2026
Sahit was happy with the outcome of the Extinction Duel. He tells Anahí that the tribe would probably send her. They want to send Tzasna and Julio. Anahí proposed sending herself to eliminate Tzasna.: Immunity/Reward Challenge: There will be two challenges.; Challenge 1: There will be multiple stages with people eliminated after each stage. Three rounds will be played, whereby the winners will qualify for the second challenge.; Stage 1: Follow a rope through obstacles.; Stage 2: Transport two balls on a platform by grabbing the platform through bars.; Stage 3: Untie bags containing balls and holders. The player must go under the net and the bag over. They must then build a tower containing said balls and holders.; Stage 4: Place the puzzle pieces on the board, so that the balls roll into their respective containers.; Stage 5: Build a frame using blocks. Then throw two sandbags onto a platform through said frame.; Avril, Tzasna and Julio qualified for the second challenge.: Challenge 2: Players must build an arch puzzle, that after being completed shows a word on each side. First player to achieve this wins Immunity and reward. Tzasna won the challenge. She also received a barbecue. She invited Shada and Julio.; At Tribal Council, Anahí and Julio were nominated by a 3–3 vote.: Extinction Duel: Nominees must place balls onto a board, so that they roll down a chute. At regular intervals, more balls will be added. The first player to drop a ball is eliminated. Anahí lost the challenge and was sent to the jury.
430	29	"Episode 29"	Days 34–35	August 21, 2026
Warrior announced the dynamics of the semi–final. There will an Extinction Challenge held, then an Immunity Challenge and finally a second Extinction Duel in the evening.: Extinction Challenge: There will be multiple stages with people eliminated after each stage. In each round, the winner will be safe from elimination.; Stage 1: Cross a stretch of sand, while using blocks. Then get a ball into a basket by using two ropes to roll it across.; Stage 2: Cross a balance beam, while balancing a ball on a bow. The players must transport two balls across the beam. Then they must retrieve a bag containing a flag with a hook.; Stage 3: Cross a balance beam, while threading a bag containing puzzle piece through a rope. Then solve a puzzle.; Stage 4: Land two balls in two baskets each by bouncing them onto a trampoline.; Julio didn't manage to win a round, so he was eliminated.: Immunity Challenge: Players had to put a bar above their heads. At the end of the bar, there is a platform that balances a ball. Last player standing with their bar wins Immunity. Sahit won the challenge.; Avril, Shada and Tzasna were nominated for the Extinction Duel.: Extinction Duel: Nominees had to transport two bags with a hook. They must then devide the blocks by colour. Once done, they must attache themselves to a weight of 15kg. They had to build a tower consisting of balls and holders, while being attached to said weight. First two players to build their tower are saved. Tzasna and Avril won, while Shada was eliminated.
431	30	"Episode 30"	Days 36–37	August 23, 2026
Immunity Challenge: In each round, players will begin by unwrapping a rope from a post to release a bag containing sandbags. They must then throw two sandbags into a basket to open a chest to obtain a platform and two balls. After going under a bar, the players have to balance the ball on the platform, while going over a balance beam. They have to transport both balls. They must then maneuver two rings through ladder rungs. The second ring contains a key that opens a chest containing puzzle pieces. After completing the puzzle, they must go under a net, while carrying a bag containing tiles. They must build a tower with said tiles. Once completed, they must knock four totems into a basket by swinging a ball to score a point. First player to score two points wins Immunity. Avril won the challenge with a final score of 2–1–0, with Tzasna scoring one point.; At Tribal Council, Sahit was voted into the final by a 4–2 vote. Tzasna received third place.: Final Challenge: There will be two challenges. The first person to win two points wins the season.; Challenge 1: Players must hang from a horizontal log. The player who hangs the longest scores a point. Avril won the challenge.; Challenge 2: In each round, players start crawling under a net. They must then climb over an a-frame, while untying a bag containing sandbags at the top. After collecting the bag, they must throw them towards pieces of wood, so that these reveal numbers for a code. With the code, they can open a chest containing tiles. They must build a tower with these tiles. After passing suspended rings, they must cross a balance beam while balancing a ball on a platform. They must then assort the coloured pieces on a board. Finally, they must land three sandbags onto an unstable platform to win one round. First player to win two rounds scores a point. Avril won with 2–0.; By winning both challenges, Avril became the Sole Survivor.

== Voting history ==
	Original tribes													Swapped tribes			Fake merge tribes						Merged tribe														
Week #	1							2			3						4						5														
Episode #	1		3		5	6		11	12		14	15		17	18		22		23		24		25		26		27		28		29			30			
Eliminated	Elimination vote			La Negra	Elimination vote		Bobby	Elimination vote		Erick	Elimination vote		Rey	Elimination vote		Viviann	Elimination vote	Sebastian	Elimination vote	La Negra	Elimination vote	Abel	Elimination vote	Aurélie	Elimination vote	Sheila	Elimination vote	Javi	Elimination vote	Anahí	Julio	Elimination vote	Shada	Elimination vote	Tzasna	Sahit	Avril
Nominated	~~Sheila~~ (Note: Sheila was saved by Tzasna.), La Negra	Bobby, ~~Erick~~ (Note: Erick was saved by Javi.)	Sheila		Bobby	La Negra		Erick	Avril		Rey	Shada		Abel	Viviann		Sebastian, Anahí		Anahí, La Negra		Aurélie, Abel		Aurélie, Julio		Anahí, Sheila		Javi, Avril		Anahí, Julio			Avril, Tzasna, Shada		Sahit, Tzasna			
Vote	No vote (Note: The losers of the Nomination Challenge would be nominated for the Extinction Duel.)	No vote (Note: The losers of the Nomination Challenge would be nominated for the Extinction Duel.)	7–1	Duel	5–3	4–4 (Note: Due to a tie, the nominee was chosen through chance.)	Duel	5–1–1	4–1–1–1	Duel	7–1	5–3	Duel	4–3	3–2–1	Duel	3–2–1	No vote (Note: Sebastian elected to quit the game, no vote occurred for his removal.)	3–2	Duel	3–2–1	Duel	4–2–2 (Note: Due to a tie, Julio was nominated through chance.)	Duel	5–3	Duel	4–3	Duel	3–3	Duel	Challenge	No vote	Duel	No vote	4–2	Final Challenge	
Voter	Vote																																				
Avril	―	Won	―		Bobby	―		Erick	Sahit	Won	―			―	Viviann	―	―	―	―		Aurélie	―	Julio	―	Anahí	―	Javi	Won	Julio	―	Won	Nominated	Won	Immune		Sole Survivor	
Sahit	―	Won	―		Bobby	―		Erick	Avril	―	―			―	Anahí	―	―	―	―		Abel	―	Javi	―	Anahí	―	Javi	―	Julio	―	Won	Immune		Nominated	Saved	Runner-up	
Tzasna	Won	―	Sheila	―	―	Julio	―	―			Rey	Shada	―	Julio	―		Sebastian	―	Anahí	―	―		Aurélie	―	Anahí	―	Avril	―	Anahí	―	Won	Nominated	Won	Nominated	Eliminated		
Shada	Won	―	Sheila	―	―	La Negra	―	―			Rey	Sheila	Won	Abel	―		Sebastian	―	Anahí	―	―		Aurélie	―	Sheila	―	Javi	―	Anahí	―	Won	Nominated	Eliminated		Tzasna		
Julio	Won	―	Sheila	―	―	La Negra	―	―			Rey	Sheila	―	Abel	―		―	―	―		Aurélie	―	Aurélie	Won	Anahí	―	Avril	―	Anahí	Won	Eliminated				Sahit		
Anahí	―	Won	―		Sahit	―		Sahit	Aurélie	―	―			―	Viviann	―	Sebastian	―	La Negra	Won	―		Exempt	―	Sheila	Won	Javi	―	Julio	Eliminated					Tzasna		
Javi	―	Won	―		Bobby	―		Erick	Avril	―	―			Abel	―		Anahí	―	La Negra	―	―		Aurélie	―	Sheila	―	Avril	Eliminated							Sahit		
Sheila	Saved	―	Julio	Won	―	Julio	―	―			Rey	Shada	―	Julio	―		―	―	―		Julio	―	Javi	―	Anahí	Eliminated									Sahit		
Aurélie	―	Won	―		Bobby	―		Erick	Avril	―	―			―	Anahí	―	―	―	―		Abel	Won	Julio	Eliminated											Sahit		
Abel	Won	―	Sheila	―	―	La Negra	―	―			Rey	Shada	―	Julio	Nominated	Won	―	―	―		Aurélie	Eliminated															
La Negra	Nominated	―	Sheila	Eliminated	―	Julio	Won	―			Rey	Shada	―	Abel	―		Anahí	―	Anahí	Eliminated																	
Sebastian	Won	―	Sheila	―	―	Julio	―	―			Rey	Shada	―	―	Viviann	―	La Negra	Quit																			
Viviann	―	Won	―		Bobby	―		Erick	Avril	―	―			―	Sahit	Eliminated																					
Rey	Won	―	Sheila	―	―	La Negra	―	―			Abel	Sheila	Eliminated																								
Erick	―	Saved	―		Sahit	―		Javi	Viviann	Eliminated																											
Bobby	―	Nominated	Nominated	Won	Sahit	Nominated	Eliminated																														
