= La mexicana y el güero =

Mexican telenovela

- Genre: Telenovela
- Created by: Kary Fajer
- Based on: Cómplices by Víctor Carrasco & Vicente Sabatini
- Developed by: Gerardo Luna
- Written by: Julián Aguilar
- Directed by: Aurelio Ávila; Víctor Rodríguez
- Starring: Itatí Cantoral; Juan Soler; Luis Roberto Guzmán
- Opening theme: "La Mentirosa" by Luis Fonsi & Paty Cantú
- Country of origin: Mexico
- Original language: Spanish
- No. of seasons: 1
- No. of episodes: 127

Production
- Executive producer: Nicandro Díaz González
- Producer: J. Antonio Arvizu
- Cinematography: Gabriel Vázquez Bulman; Alejandro Frutos Maza
- Camera setup: Multi-camera
- Production company: Televisa

Original release
- Network: Las Estrellas
- Release: 17 August 2020 – 7 February 2021

La mexicana y el güero (International title: I Love You, Güero) is a Mexican telenovela produced by Nicandro Díaz González that aired on Las Estrellas from 17 August 2020 to 7 February 2021. It is an adaptation of the Chilean telenovela titled Cómplices created by Víctor Carrasco and Vicente Sabatini. The story revolves around Andrea (Itatí Cantoral), a beautiful swindler, and Tyler (Juan Soler), an idealistic millionaire who returns to Mexico in search of his biological family after his adoptive mother dies and tells him to return to his place of origin.

== Plot ==
Andrea Ibarrola (Itatí Cantoral) is a professional con artist, who uses her beauty, intelligence and charm to fool her victims. In the United States, Andrea has an accomplice named Olinka (Sabine Moussier), who gives her information about Tyler Somers (Juan Soler), her next victim. He is the largest producer of Idaho quality potatoes in the world and at the same time he is a kind and noble man. Tyler was adopted, Rose (Lorena Velázquez) his adoptive mother asks him to find his biological mother Matilde Rojas. Andrea begins to devise a master plan for Tyler to believe that he has found his biological family. She gets in touch with him, saying that she is his sister and that his real mother wants to see him, like the rest of the family, who await him in Mexico with open arms. Andrea hires seven people with financial difficulties to join this fake family. Thanks to the substantial pay, everyone agrees to play their role. Tyler is impressed upon meeting Andrea, his supposed sister. Andrea also immediately feels something very special for him. Having truly fallen in love with her victim, Andrea will have to choose between continuing with her plan or love.

== Cast ==
=== Main ===
- Itatí Cantoral as Andrea Ibarrola Gil
- Juan Soler as Tyler Somers
- Luis Roberto Guzmán as René Fajardo
- Jacqueline Andere as Matilde "Maty" Rojas
- Nora Salinas as Helena Peñaloza de Heredia
- Irán Castillo as Gladys Carmona
- Julio Camejo as Mario Nava
- Gala Montes as Katya Ibarrola Gil
- Sian Chiong as Diego Torres
- Eleazar Gómez as Sebastián de la Mora (episodes 1–102)
- Jackie Sauza as Erika Núñez
- Gabriela Zamora as Marcia Serrano
- Pablo Valentín as Luis Ayala
- Laura Vignatti as Sofía Gastelum de Nava
- Miguel Martínez as Ignacio Santoyo de la Mora
- Gabriela Carrillo as Paulina Villaseñor
- Montserrat Marañón as Chabela
- Patricio Castillo as Jaime Salvatorre
- Alejandra Procuna as Isis de Robles
- José Montini as Bonifacio Robles
- Tania Lizardo as Zulema Gutiérrez
- Daniela Álvarez as Viiyéri Neiya Robles
- Rodrigo Brand as Brandon Heredia Peñaloza
- Elaine Haro as Rocío Heredia Peñaloza
- Danielle Lefaure as Megan Robin
- Lara Campos as Melody Nava Gastelum
- Rodrigo Abed as Gonzalo Heredia
- Sabine Moussier as Olinka Cohen
- Ferdinando Valencia as Sebastián de la Mora (episodes 103–127)

=== Special guest stars ===
- Lorena Velázquez as Rose Somers
- Horacio Pancheri as Rodrigo Avellaneda
- Rocío Banquells as María Dolores "Lolita" Santoyo de la Mora
- Omar Fierro as Agustín Gastellum
- Xavier Marc as Malacara
- Aleida Núñez as Rosenda
- Octavio Ocaña as Sr. Cruz
- Lucero Lander as Piedad de la Mora de Santoyo
- Martha Julia as Vanessa Larios
- Norma Lazareno as Crucita
- María Prado as Dulce
- Erika Buenfil as Doctor Mónica Traven
- Ana Martín as Toñita

== Production ==
Filming was originally scheduled for March 2020, but due to the COVID-19 pandemic in Mexico, it was suspended. However, filming began on 9 June 2020 in forums 10 and 15 of Televisa San Ángel. A blessing ceremony was held as Televisa usually does every year, where actors who are part of the cast were present as Itatí Cantoral, Juan Soler, Luis Roberto Guzmán, Jacqueline Andere, Patricio Castillo, Nora Salinas, Gala Montes, Laura Vignatti, and Rodrigo Abed. On 19 June 2020, the People en Español website confirmed the addition of new actors such as Julio Camejo, and Lara Campos.

== Ratings ==
Viewership and ratings per season of La mexicana y el güero
Season	Timeslot (CT)	Episodes	First aired		Last aired		Avg. viewers (millions)
Season	Timeslot (CT)	Episodes	Date	Viewers (millions)	Date	Viewers (millions)	Avg. viewers (millions)
1	Mon–Fri 8:30 pm (1–30); Mon–Fri 6:30 pm (31–127)	108 (Note: should reflect the number of episodes that contribute to the average given in the last column)	17 August 2020	3.3	7 February 2021	3.6	2.76

== Episodes ==
No.	Title	Original release date	Mexico viewers (millions)
1	"Vamos a despelucar a un güero"	17 August 2020 (Note: Premiered early online through Las Estrellas website on 14 August 2020.)	3.3
Olinka and Andrea decide to scam Tyler Somers, who will travel to Mexico to find his real mother. René and Chabela gather those indicated to represent the false family.
2	"Yo soy Tyler Somers, su pariente"	18 August 2020	3.2
Andrea gives all members of the family their roles and obligations in their new job. Tyler Somers arrives at the Campoamor estate by surprise. René asks Andrea to marry him.
3	"Me estoy enamorando de ti"	19 August 2020	3.2
The family goes out to celebrate the arrival of the güero; Tyler confesses his feelings to Andrea and kisses her. Katya tries to seduce Diego.
4	"El güero decide volver a su hogar"	20 August 2020	3.2
Tyler chooses to return to Idaho after making out with Andrea, a fact that upsets the entire family. Matilde runs away from the house and on the way runs into Jaime, with whom she goes for a walk.
5	"No puedo sacarte de mi corazón"	21 August 2020	3.1
While Tyler mentions to René that he has kissed Andrea, she admits to Chabela that she has fallen in love with Tyler. Meanwhile, Andrea asks Matilde to forget about Jaime, if she doesn't want to lose her job.
6	"El último deseo de papá"	24 August 2020	2.6
The whole family goes out to scatter the ashes of their father; Tyler Somers is moved for fulfilling his will. Rocío confronts Gonzalo and he tells the truth to Helena.
7	"El plan empieza a dar color"	25 August 2020	2.7
Tyler offers Andrea to cooperate with the household expenses. Gladys and Mario almost kiss and Paulina finds a photo of Diego in Sebastián's wallet. Tyler asks Matilde why she put him up for adoption.
8	"Gallo enchilado"	26 August 2020	3.1
Andrea gets crazy seeing so many people at the Campoamor estate that she has a strong discussion with her daughter. Tyler offers Katya to find her father.
9	"¡Tenemos que actuar rápido!"	27 August 2020	2.7
Andrea and René are surprised to discover the true support Tyler wants to give them. Diego confesses his secret to Katya.
10	"Quiero recuperar tu amor"	28 August 2020	2.7
Andrea complains to Gonzalo for not respecting the rules and insults him, but he confesses that he wants to be with her again; Helena sees them together.
11	"!Maty y Jaime se comprometen!"	31 August 2020	2.6
The family celebrates Maty and Jaime's engagement. Katya initiates a plan to separate Paulina from Diego.
12	"Va a arder Troya"	1 September 2020	2.5
Because of their mistakes, Andrea threatens the family with reducing their salary, so they decide to leave the Campoamor estate.
13	"Consecuencias legales"	2 September 2020	2.7
Andrea threatens Gonzalo with legally penalizing him for breach of contract. Sebastián is concerned that he may lose his license as a doctor. Andrea gets jealous when she learns that Tyler met Erika.
14	"¡Secuestraron a Tyler!"	3 September 2020	2.5
Tyler finds René naked in Andrea's bed. Boni and Luis decide to kidnap Tyler to teach him a lesson; the family is in shock. Maty makes a peculiar proposal to Jaime, upsetting Andrea again.
15	"¡Tyler escapa!"	4 September 2020	2.9
Tyler manages to flee from his kidnappers. Mario and Gladys kiss at the request of Tyler and Sebastián will receive a surprise from Ignacio.
16	"Hablando se entiende la gente"	7 September 2020	2.6
Andrea apologizes to Erika, but has a plan to get her away from Tyler. Katya and Paulina fight and Sofía questions Gladys about Mario. Isis discovers that Viiyéri belongs to what she believes to be a sect.
17	"Ahí te van las perruchas"	8 September 2020	2.7
Katya steals a car and escapes to Acapulco with Viiyéri. Andrea asks René to make Erika fall in love with him and he starts the plan to win her over. Mario hits Ignacio when he discovers that he is the one who seduces his wife Sofía.
18	"¡Katya renuncia a la estafa!"	9 September 2020	3.0
Diego, by order of Andrea, looks for Katya and asks her to return home, but she refuses. Andrea decides to go get her. Gonzalo confesses that he is still in love with Andrea and Gladys kisses Mario.
19	"No hacen falta más palabras"	10 September 2020	2.7
Katya puts a condition on Andrea to return home. Tyler and Andrea spend an evening in Acapulco; he kisses her passionately. René gets jealous when he sees them together.
20	"Mi silencio tiene precio"	11 September 2020	2.5
René threatens Tyler with telling everyone of his love for Andrea. Katya and Diego kiss and Tyler decides to leave the farm earlier than planned.
21	"¡Katya conoce a su 'papá'!"	14 September 2020	2.8
Andrea tricks Katya into thinking that Sabino is her real father. Helena no longer believes in Gonzalo. Mario confesses to Sofía that he was unfaithful to her.
22	"¡Aquí acaba todo!"	15 September 2020	2.2
On Andrea's orders, Sabino despises Katya. Mario is in trouble. Sofía demands that he give her her place in front of Gladys and Tyler, but he will have to lie for the scam. Tyler tells Andrea that René asked him for money for his silence.
23	"Problema tras problema"	16 September 2020	2.4
Tyler summons the whole family so that René tells them the truth, but he makes up that he will marry Zulema and apologizes to Tyler for blackmailing him. Mario takes Melody to the estate.
24	"Todos los hombres son iguales"	17 September 2020	2.7
Andrea breaks up with René when she finds out that he is sleeping with Zulema. Katya and Viiyéri steal a watch, causing Andrea to fire Diego from the scam.
25	"Como una plantita sin agua"	18 September 2020	2.8
Andrea asks Diego to return to the scam, but he does not accept and Katya wants to die knowing that Diego will not return. Due to the robbery that Viiyéri committed, Boni forbids her to continue at work with her friend. Tyler meets Melody.
26	"El amor es una trampa"	21 September 2020	2.4
Tyler and Erika have a romantic date, but he only thinks about Andrea. Diego confesses to Andrea that he is gay and that is why he cannot be with Katya. Katya is still depressed about Diego.
27	"Estalló la bomba"	22 September 2020	2.3
Katya pretends to have taken pills to end her life so that she can keep Diego by her side. Andrea shows Tyler some photos and ends up being disappointed in Erika.
28	"¿Qué hacen los mariachis en la sala?"	23 September 2020	2.6
Luis brings mariachis to Marcia and manages to win her back, but Andrea gets upset and creates a scandal. Tylers gets drunk and Katya discovers him kissing Andrea.
29	"La más grande de las verdades"	24 September 2020	2.6
René gives up the scam and demands his money from Andrea, but she swears eternal love. Matilde shows Erika the proof why Tyler doesn't want to know about her and will do everything to find out who set her up.
30	"¡El fantasma de la niña ahogada!"	25 September 2020	2.8
The whole family is scared to see Melody hanging around the Campoamor estate, since Jaime assures that it is the ghost of the drowned girl. Erika manages to talk to Tyler and he discovers that Andrea planned to separate him from Erika.
31	"Interpreta mi silencio"	28 September 2020	2.3
Tyler demands that Andrea apologize to Erika, but Andrea looks for Erika's boss and convinces him to fire her. Megan and Viiyéri end up fighting for Brandon's love.
32	"Te quiero fuera de mi vida"	29 September 2020	2.7
Sebastián kicks out Diego from the apartment and does not want to see him again. Tyler gives Matilde a credit card so she can buy everything for her wedding, but Andrea disagrees and tries to take it from her. Katya sees her father again.
33	"La villana del cuento"	30 September 2020	2.6
Andrea apologizes to Tyler for what happened to Matilde and confirms that her mother is a gambler. Andrea is distressed to learn that Tyler called Olinka to go to Mexico to visit him. Diego asks Katya to let him stay a few days at the estate.
34	"Corrió a los brazos de la muerte"	1 October 2020	2.8
While Megan suffers from kidnapping Púas, Jaime tells Maty that the best thing would be to call off the wedding. Tyler looks for Erika to fix things and they kiss. Andrea thinks that Diego likes women, but Diego is clear about his sexual preferences. Paulina visits Tyler and discovers that Gladys and Mario are posing as his relatives.
35	"El que paga, manda"	2 October 2020	2.4
It is payday and everyone is upset when they see that they received less money and ask Andrea to pay them in full. Tyler and Erika spend a weekend together. Tyler surprises Erika and they spend a weekend together.
36	"¡Santa patrona de los berrinches!"	5 October 2020	2.4
Matilde slips by accident and blames Andrea and Chabela for plotting against her. Diego and Sebastián beat each other up after both get jealous for kissing Katya and Paulina.
37	"Mi buena obra del día"	6 October 2020	2.6
Malacra enters Helena's house to collect Gonzalo's debt, but Andrea saves her from being sacked. Diego tries to fix things with Sebastián and Zulema kisses Tyler.
38	"¡Güero coscolino!"	7 October 2020	2.6
René takes advantage of the fact that Tyler kisses Zulema to end their engagement. Gonzalo kisses Andrea and she confronts Tyler for kissing Zulema, but he assures her that it would be something else if they weren't related. Helena asks Brandon to keep an eye on Gonzalo, believing that he is unfaithful to her with another woman.
39	"Lo amo como nunca me imaginé amar"	8 October 2020	2.6
Erika confronts Tyler for kissing Zulema and makes things clear to him. Andrea is hysterical that Tyler has multiple women in his life and they can't be happy. Helena prepares a surprise for Gonzalo.
40	"Ahora vamos a hacerlo a mi modo"	9 October 2020	2.4
René tells Andrea that if she wants him to leave Zulema, they will have to formalize their relationship regardless of what Tyler thinks. Tyler agrees to produce a wine with Ignacio.
41	"Yo no soy el amor de tu vida"	12 October 2020	2.6
Tyler gets drunk knowing that René loves Andrea; He asks her to forget him and to give René a chance, since their love is impossible. Katya, Viiyeri and Chío attend Mega's birthday party.
42	"Tu perro fiel"	13 October 2020	2.9
To make their relationship credible, Andrea demands that René make her fall in love with him like a gentleman. Katya tries to take Diego to a motel, but he rejects her.
43	"¿Qué le hicieron a Melody?"	14 October 2020	2.7
Melody escapes from the estate when she hears Mario and Gladys talking. René brings flowers to Andrea. Diego opens his heart to Marcia. Sofía gives Mario an ultimatum.
44	"Plan de ligue"	15 October 2020	2.8
Katya decides to make Diego jealous with another man and her plan works. Andrea and René have their first romantic date and Tyler gets jealous.
45	"¿Cuál es la bronca?"	16 October 2020	2.9
Katya uses Brandon to make Diego jealous, but Andrea, seeing them, forbids Katya from being around Brandon. Mario and Sofía try to fix things. Tyler and Erika spend the afternoon together, but are interrupted.
46	"¡Descubrí tu secreto!"	19 October 2020	2.7
Thanks to Tyler's mistake, Gonzálo already knows that Andrea is actually scamming him and lets her know that he already discovered her scam, so now he must be part of the business or else he will tell Tyler the whole truth. Brandon finds Helena passed out.
47	"La solución está en tus manos"	20 October 2020	2.7
Andrea seduces Gonzalo to prevent her plan from failing. Katya gets Diego drunk so she can be intimate with him.
48	"¿A cuánto asciende la fortuna de Tyler?"	21 October 2020	2.7
Andrea and Katya access Tyler's computer to check his accounts, but are discovered. Diego confesses to Marcia that he is hung up on with Katya. The family meets to learn about the real estate expansion plan.
49	"¿Falsas esperanzas?"	22 October 2020	2.4
Sebastián complains to Diego for telling Marcia about their relationship and assures him that he no longer loves him. Andrea lends René money to pay the debt. Diego kisses Katya and he begins to feel something for her.
50	"No la chifles que es cantada"	23 October 2020	2.4
Gonzalo threatens Andrea and she tells René that Gonzalo discovered their plan, he suggests that they get rid of him. Sofía asks Mario for a divorce.
51	"¡Renuncio!"	26 October 2020	2.9
By accident, Katya listens to the recording in which Gonzalo expresses his love for Andrea. Maty announces that she is leaving the estate because of Andrea's impositions; Tyler tries to stop her. Gladys and Mario are carried away by passion and make love.
52	"Los resultados de la biopsia"	27 October 2020	2.7
Katya questions Gonzalo about his relationship with Andrea and why they broke up. Sebastián is more disappointed in Diego when he sees him with Katya. Gonzalo receives the results of Helena's biopsy. Jaime looks for Tyler to talk about the wedding with Maty.
53	"Escena de teatro griego"	28 October 2020	2.5
Luis hits Tyler for "renting" a family and Andrea tries to convince Tyler that Luis is a poor maniac. Diego suffers a serious accident. René locks Luis in a psychiatric hospital.
54	"Entre gitanas no nos leemos la mano"	29 October 2020	2.9
Andrea threatens to disappear Gladys and Mario and also complains to Maty for taking advantage of Tyler, but Maty tells her that she is not the only one who wants to do it. Marcia demands to know where her husband is.
55	"Estás perdiendo puntos con el güero"	30 October 2020	2.5
Andrea is concerned that Maty has more power in Tyler than she does. Marcia and Boni rescue Luis and Gonzalo, but René confronts them. Ignacio is surprised to see Diego and Sebastián in the same bed.
56	"Ojalá no hubieras aparecido"	2 November 2020	2.7
Thanks to Andrea, Tyler decides to put the beach house in her name. Maty is furious with Tyler and ends up despising him to such a degree that it breaks his heart. Mario warns Ignacio to stay away from his wife, because his patience has a limit.
57	"Se gana más con miel que con hiel"	3 November 2020	2.6
Sebastián proposes to Diego that he leave his job and he goes to introduce him to his parents. Maty cancels her wedding with Jaime. Sabino shows up drunk to demand money, but René intercepts him. Olinka suggests that Andrea change tactic with Maty and Tyler.
58	"La cereza del pastel"	4 November 2020	2.7
Andrea puts Sabino in his place. Katya suggests Diego to have a fake wedding to please her uncle Tyler. Mario agrees to divorce Sofía.
59	"¡El padre de Katya es Gonzalo Heredia!"	5 November 2020	2.7
René threatens Andrea with telling Katya the truth, so she has no choice but to reveal her secret. René demands that Gonzalo stay away from his woman. Lolita arrives in Mexico City.
60	"Vamos a apresurar el plan"	6 November 2020	2.5
Gonzalo has an idea to get the money from Tyler as soon as possible. René makes a scene of jealousy to Andrea and Tyler. Lolita comes to Mexico City to alter the lives of Sebastián, Diego and Ignacio. Brandon ends his relationship with Viiyeri to return to Megan.
61	"Chip con rastreo satelital"	9 November 2020	2.3
Andrea comes up with a new lie to stop Gonzalo from kidnapping Tyler. Sofía confronts Gladys and beats her for giving Melody a teddy bear, but Mario puts Sofía in her place. Katya meets Lolita.
62	"Acepto casarme contigo"	10 November 2020	2.7
Diego agrees to marry Katya, both break the news to Andrea. René wants to get rid of Gonzalo and Erika forever, but Andrea disagrees.
63	"Nuestro problema se llama Andrea Ibarrola"	11 November 2020	3.0
Gonzalo and Helena fight, she blames Andrea for their problems. Andrea announces Katya and Diego's wedding, but Katya has decided to change the plan.
64	"¡Todo se terminó!"	12 November 2020	2.8
Gonzalo saves Helena from the seductive Juan Carlos, but he cannot forgive her for her betrayal. Tyler wants Katya's wedding to have a thousand guests. Mario asks Sofía for a divorce.
65	"Quien siembra tormentas, cosecha tempestades"	13 November 2020	3.0
Andrea will take advantage of Gonzalo's separation to take revenge on him. Helena discovers that Gonzalo and Andrea are lovers. Tyler asks Andrea to swear to him that they will never separate. Diego points out to Sebastián's mother that her son is in love with someone else.
66	"El hombre que amo eres tú"	16 November 2020	2.8
Tyler gets jealous when he learns that Andrea has a lover, so she confesses that who she really loves is him and kisses him.
67	"Nadie se mete con mi mujer"	17 November 2020	2.9
René faces Gonzalo with blows for being Andrea's lover. Andrea is afraid that Tyler will find out the whole lie. Helena argues with Gonzalo and he takes a strong blow. René confronts Andrea and asks her to explain her relationship with Gonzalo.
68	"Yo soy el amor de tu vida"	18 November 2020	2.9
Gonzalo demands love from Andrea, but she resists. Sofía shows off her new look and leaves Mario speechless. Melody suffers because of Lady Ebria. Brandon discovers the truth about his father and disowns him.
69	"Una cortina de humo"	19 November 2020	2.7
Andrea and René have a new plan against Tyler and René confesses to him that his relationship with Andrea ended. Gonzalo ends his "marriage" with Marcia. Katya scams Andrea.
70	"En la guerra y en el amor todo se vale"	20 November 2020	2.4
Katya assures Viiyéri that the trick she will do to Diego is out of love. Andrea questions Tyler about his feelings. René tells Gonzalo that his fling with Andrea is over. Tyler reserves a bridal suit for Katya and Diego's wedding night.
71	"Despedida de soltero exprés"	23 November 2020	2.6
Tyler tells René that he is sorry that he broke up with Andrea, but he replies that the reason for the meeting is to plan Diego's bachelor party. Sebastián writes a letter confessing his secret to his mother, but Ignacio reads it.
72	"Casado se va a morir de amor por mí"	24 November 2020	3.3
Viiyéri tells Katya that she shouldn't get married because she is lying to Diego but she replies that she is jealous, so she pulls her out while telling her that she will not ruin her day. Ignacio asks Sofía to live together.
73	"Los declaro marido y mujer"	25 November 2020	3.3
Katya manages to marry Diego, but an unexpected guest arrives at the wedding, causing several conflicts on the Campoamor estate.
74	"En la boca del lobo"	26 November 2020	3.2
Although Diego refuses to continue with the charade, he agrees to spend his wedding night with Katya at the hotel so that Tyler won't be bothered. René looks for Sabino to settle accounts, but he will be in danger. Maty suffers from the theft of her money. Ignacio confronts Sebastián and despises him.
75	"A calzón quitado"	27 November 2020	2.5
After Katya asks Diego not to give up and makes him believe that they spent their wedding night together, he is determined to leave her. Katya accepts that Diego does not love her. Gladys discovers that she is pregnant. Sebastián tells Andrea that Diego and Katya had sex.
76	"Te desgraciaste la vida"	30 November 2020	N/A
After her mother's insistence when asking her to leave Diego, Katya has no choice but to tell her that her wedding was real. Mario questions Gladys about the pregnancy test. Tyler thinks Diego is hiding something.
77	"Caíste en una trampa"	1 December 2020	N/A
Marcia reveals to Diego that the wedding was not a fake wedding. Andrea tells René that he ruined Katya's life by concealing that she was getting married for real, since Diego doesn't like women. Mario despises the baby Gladys is expecting.
78	"Por las buenas o por las malas"	2 December 2020	N/A
Diego gets upset with Katya for having deceived him with the wedding, but she threatens to never give him a divorce. Tyler announces Gladys's pregnancy to the family.
79	"Nunca sabrás más de mí"	3 December 2020	N/A
Katya leaves a letter to Andrea where she says goodbye forever; Andrea searches desperately for her. René takes revenge against Sabino.
80	"Andrea y Helena hacen un pacto"	4 December 2020	2.6
Andrea swears to Katya not to keep secrets from her and asks her to return home. Sabino has an accident. Helena asks Andrea for a job and she offers her half of Gonzalo's salary in exchange for a favor. Sebastián kicks out Diego from the house. Olinka plans to go to Mexico City.
81	"Tu llegada cambió nuestras vidas"	7 December 2020	3.0
Andrea thanks Tyler for supporting Katya in her depression. Megan attacks Viiyéri causing a short circuit. Katya agrees to go on a trip with Viiyéri to Europe.
82	"Yo no soy tu padre"	8 December 2020	N/A
Sabino decides to go away, but first he reveals the truth to Katya. Tyler can't get Andrea out of his heart. Gladys is happy about her first ultrasound. Sofía points out to Mario that she cannot give him a divorce, because she is still in love with him and they end up making love. Tyler wants to change his will.
83	"La reina de las mentiras"	9 December 2020	N/A
Katya tells Andrea that she doesn't want to see her again and reveals to the whole family what she did to her; Tyler is disappointed. Erika suggests that Tyler take the DNA test again.
84	"Andrea es una víctima"	10 December 2020	2.7
Andrea and René come up with a new lie to clean up Andrea's image. Sofía tells Gladys that she had sex with Mario and breaks her heart.
85	"¡Renuncio!"	11 December 2020	2.6
Gladys despises Mario for having cheated on her and decides to leave the Campoamor estate. Tyler comforts Andrea. Katya will not give up on Diego.
86	"Hay que matar al güero"	14 December 2020	2.8
Olinka and René agree to get rid of Tyler if he names Andrea as his universal heiress. Andrea threatens Mario with firing him if he can't get Gladys back to the house.
87	"Andrea y René despelucan al güero"	15 December 2020	3.0
Tyler hands Andrea bundles of bills to pay for the alleged legal problem; both celebrate. Jaime is fired and Tyler offers him to stay and live in the estate.
88	"El premio a la mamá del año"	16 December 2020	2.8
Katya arrives at the house and finds Andrea happy with René. Andrea tries to buy Katya with the money Tyler gave her, but she rejects her. Gonzalo demands from Andrea part of the mutiny that Tyler gave her.
89	"Una oferta difícil de rechazar"	17 December 2020	N/A
Gonzalo demands part of the money from Andrea or threatens to tell Tyler everything. Andrea prepares a surprise for Gonzalo. Tyler makes it clear to Erika that there is already someone in his heart. Mario falls into Melody's blackmail.
90	"¡Prueba de ADN!"	18 December 2020	N/A
Gonzalo demands that Andrea do a DNA test on Katya to see if she is his daughter or not. Sebastián invites Paulina out. Chabela and Katya meet up.
91	"Paulina, ¡soy gay!"	21 December 2020	N/A
Paulina thinks she will have a romantic dinner with Sebastián, but in reality he will confess that he is gay. Gonzalo agrees with Malacara to kill René. Andrea discovers that Katya is living in Luis's house and demands that she return to the estate. Tyler gives Erika a gift to reconcile. Brandon breaks Rocío's heart.
92	"Andrea sufre un colapso"	22 December 2020	N/A
Andrea attacks Marcia and calls her a traitor and demands that she not mess with her daughter. Paulina suffers for the love of Sebastián. Sofía goes crazy when she sees Gladys's room and destroys the baby's items.
93	"Con el alma en un hilo"	23 December 2020	N/A
Mario complains to Sofía for destroying the baby's things; she hits herself and makes Melody believe it was Mario who hit her. Andrea suffers from stress arrhythmia and reconciles with Katya.
94	"¿Abortar la misión?"	24 December 2020	N/A
Andrea is thinking of canceling the scam; She also asks René not to act against Gonzalo. Tyler finds out that Diego is gay. Mario confronts Sofía.
95	"Con mi hija no"	25 December 2020	N/A
Gonzalo tries to get closer to Katya, but Andrea stops him. Diego reveals to Katya that he is gay.
96	"Soy la heredera universal de Tyler Somers"	28 December 2020	N/A
Diego confesses to Katya that he is gay and that Sebastián is his partner. To her great surprise, Andrea reviews Tyler's will and discovers that she is the universal heiress to his fortune.
97	"Matar dos pájaros de un tiro"	29 December 2020	N/A
After hearing Andrea's discovery, Gonzalo has a new plan in hand; He plans not only to get rid of René, but Tyler as well, and thus stay with Andrea.
98	"Mi gran error"	30 December 2020	N/A
René looks for convincing ways to assassinate Tyler. Erika confronts Tyler about his relationship with Andrea. Mario decides to go find Melody to explain the true situation with Sofía.
99	"Hasta nunca, Tyler"	31 December 2020	N/A
Gonzalo decides to cause a helicopter accident to blame René and win over Andrea. Katya takes revenge on Diego. René suspects that Andrea is in love with Tyler.
100	"¡Tyler sufre un accidente!"	1 January 2021	N/A
Gonzalo and Malacara carry out the plan to cause an accident in Tyler's helicopter, however, Andrea thinks it was René who caused the accident.
101	"Resiste mi amor"	4 January 2021	2.5
Andrea suffers for Tyler's health; he resists the operation and enters intensive care. René and Gonzalo are upset to see that Tyler was saved from the accident. Gonzalo confronts Malacara for the failure of the plan.
102	"Las causas exactas del accidente"	5 January 2021	2.5
Tyler is determined to find out what happened to the helicopter. Gonzalo threatens René and Andrea with telling Tyler that they wanted to kill him.
103	"La verdadera madre de Tyler Somers"	6 January 2021	2.5
Nurse Dulce takes Crucita to the Campoamor estate to ask Andrea for help and, on the way, Crucita runs into Tyler, whom she mistakes for Leopoldo. Vanessa informs Tyler that the accident was actually an attack.
104	"Me voy a quedar para siempre"	7 January 2021	2.6
Tyler announces to the family that he will no longer stay with them for a year, but for life. Katya reveals to Diego that she is pregnant.
105	"Embriagado de amor"	8 January 2021	2.6
Tyler and Andrea drink excessively and end up having sex. Katya uses Gladys's pregnancy test. Diego and Sebastián break up because of Katya.
106	"Todo era una gran farsa"	11 January 2021	2.9
Tyler hears Andrea say that they are not family and that they are scamming him to get his money; He ends up disappointed and fleeing the Campoamor estate.
107	"¡Quiero que ellos paguen!"	12 January 2021	2.9
Tyler asks Detective Larios to investigate the fake family. Andrea is desperate for Tyler. Gonzalo discovers that Katya is his daughter.
108	"Solo quiero la verdad"	13 January 2021	3.2
Rodrigo suggests to Tyler to report the false family, but he assures him that he does not seek revenge or justice. Helena makes it clear to Andrea that she is not going to reveal Katya's secret.
109	"Lobos con piel de oveja"	14 January 2021	3.0
Tyler sends Rodrigo to investigate what is happening in the Campoamor estate. Rodrigo is shocked by Katya's beauty. Andrea asks Rodrigo for help to find Tyler; he believes her words. Gonzalo confronts Diego for getting Katya pregnant. Sebastián decides to go to Europe.
110	"Un amor que duele tanto"	15 January 2021	2.7
Rodrigo and Katya go out to dinner, but Andrea and Tyler spy on them. Tyler discovers that Olinka could also be behind the scam.
111	"Una oferta que no podrás rechazar"	18 January 2021	2.7
Andrea proposes to Gonzalo to give him a good amount of money in exchange for his silence. René hits Diego. The whole family receives a strange invitation.
112	"Una nueva etapa"	19 January 2021	3.0
Because he was attacking Diego, Sebastián decides to stop René and confront him. Tyler reappears before the whole family and explains the reason for his disappearance. Andrea now wants to put an end to the scam.
113	"Vengo a cuidar mis intereses"	20 January 2021	3.2
Olinka surprises Andrea by showing up at the Campoamor estate to demand her money and, incidentally, fight for the love of Tyler Somers and this provokes Andrea and Erika's jealousy.
114	"Esto se está poniendo color de hormiga"	21 January 2021	2.9
Rodrigo catches Andrea and René burning the real estate documents. Olinka demands that Andrea speed up the scam or they will get caught. Tyler seeks out Helena to ask her about her relationship with Gonzalo.
115	"Tener la cabeza fría"	22 January 2021	2.9
Olinka threatens Andrea with killing Katya if she reveals the scam. Tyler discovers that everyone in the Campoamor estate were hired by Andrea to pretend to be his family. Katya reveals to Andrea that she is not pregnant.
116	"Daños colaterales"	25 January 2021	2.8
Olinka throws Katya down the stairs to teach Andrea a lesson. Andrea slaps Olinka for what she did. Thanks to the accident, Katya pretends to have lost the baby. Rodrigo discovers that Luis and Marcia are married.
117	"Una tonta venganza"	26 January 2021	2.8
Katya reveals to Diego that she was never pregnant. Tyler receives the DNA tests from Maty and Mario is arrested because of Sofía.
118	"Es hora de que los cuervos se saquen los ojos"	27 January 2021	3.1
Brandon discovers that he has a tumor. Gonzalo flees after Malacara's arrest. Katya and Rodrigo almost kiss. Tyler appoints Mario as manager of all his businesses; Gonzalo explodes in front of the whole family.
119	"Se pintó de colores"	28 January 2021	2.8
Andrea and Tyler discover that Gonzalo left the estate. Gonzalo is mugged and attacked by some thugs. Brandon agrees to have surgery. Sofía has a nervous breakdown again. Tyler learns from Marcia that Katya is Gonzalo's daughter.
120	"¿Dónde está Matilde Rojas?"	29 January 2021	3.0
Tyler discovers that Andrea and Olinka are enemies and that one of them might know the whereabouts of his real mother. Katya and Rodrigo kiss. Maty discovers that René is with Olinka. Tyler announces to Andrea that Olinka will live on the estate.
121	"En la que te metiste Brunilda"	1 February 2021	3.0
Maty quits from Tyler, but he tells her that she is not part of a job, but a scam. Melody escapes from Sofía, but while trying to catch her, she is run over and her life is in danger.
122	"La prueba de fuego"	2 February 2021	2.6
Tyler changes his will and grants Andrea 10 million dollars to run a new foundation. Zulema quits her job and René's love. Katya finally signs the divorce. Sofía returns home.
123	"Así nos tocó el destino"	3 February 2021	3.0
Andrea repays Tyler the money he loaned her. Brandon reveals to Katya that Gonzalo is her father. Sofía drinks again.
124	"Di tus últimas palabras"	4 February 2021	2.8
Katya is disappointed in Andrea and swears that she will never see her again. Tyler has decided to sue Andrea for embezzlement. Olinka kidnaps Andrea and shoots her twice in order to steal her money.
125	"Una mujer con la suerte destorcida"	5 February 2021	3.2
After shooting Andrea, Olinka escapes with the money, but the police will not allow her to run away. Everyone, especially Katya, suffers from Andrea's death, but René will find a clue that will change the fate of the family.
126	"Perdona nuestros pecados"	7 February 2021	3.6
127	"Saldar cuentas"	7 February 2021	3.6
Andrea takes Tyler to his real mother. Lolita finds Sebastián in bed with Diego. René surrenders himself to the police. Katya and Rodrigo get married on the same day that Andrea turns herself in to the police in order to deserve Tyler's love.
