= Súbete a Mi Moto (2020 TV series) =

Biographical drama web television series

- Genre: Drama; Biographical; Musical
- Written by: Mary Black-Suarez; Edgar Cuevas; Camilo Hernández; Sergio Jablon; Abe Panes
- Directed by: Javier Solar; Raúl García
- Starring: Ethan Schwartz; Felipe Albors; Rocío Verdejo; Josette Vidal; Marisol Calero; Sian Chiong; Yamil Ureña; Braulio Castillo; Diego Rodulfo
- Countries of origin: Mexico; Puerto Rico
- Original language: Spanish
- No. of seasons: 1
- No. of episodes: 15

Production
- Production location: Caguas, Puerto Rico
- Running time: 60 minutes
- Production companies: Somos Productions; Endemol Shine Boomdog; Piñolywood Studios

Original release
- Network: Amazon Prime Video
- Release: October 9, 2020

Súbete a Mi Moto is a biographical television series about the Latin boy band Menudo. The series narrates the history of the band from its creation to its evolution and international success. Menudo was the band that launched music stars such as Ricky Martin and others. Consisting of 15 episodes of 60 minutes each, the series premiered on Amazon Prime Video on October 9, 2020, in Mexico, Latin America, and Spain. In the United States, the series premiered on Estrella TV on February 14, 2021.

== Cast ==
- Felipe Albors and Ethan Schwartz as Ricky Martin
- Marcelo Otaño and Eugenio Rivera as Ricky Meléndez
- Samu Jove as Xavier Serbiá
- Gustavo Rosa as Sergio Blass
- Alejandro Bermúdez as René Farrait
- Lionel Otero as Johnny Lozada
- Mauro Hernández as Miguel Cancel
- Yamil Ureña and Braulio Castillo, Jr. as Edgardo Díaz, founder and manager of Menudo
- Sian Chiong as Joselo Vega
- Marisol Calero as Doña Panchi
- Josette Vidal as Julieta Torres
- Rocío Verdejo as Renata Torres
- Adrián Isaac Rivera as Rubén Gomez
- Diego Rodulfo Martínez as Charlie Masso
- Pedro Emiliano Vazquez as Robby Rosa
- Sergio Mancilla López as Ashley Ruiz
- Amanda Rivera Torres as Millie Aviles

== Episodes ==
No.	Title	Directed by	Written by	Original release date
1	"Todo tiene un principio… o dos"	Javier Solar & Raúl García	Mary Black Suarez, Edgar Cuevas, and Camilo Hernández	October 9, 2020
2	"…y todo tiene su final"	Javier Solar & Raúl García	Mary Black Suarez, Edgar Cuevas, and Camilo Hernández	October 9, 2020
3	"El que juega con fuego…"	Javier Solar & Raúl García	Mary Black Suarez, Edgar Cuevas, and Camilo Hernández	October 9, 2020
4	"Menudomanía"	Javier Solar & Raúl García	Mary Black Suarez, Edgar Cuevas, and Camilo Hernández	October 9, 2020
5	"El lado oscuro de la fama"	Javier Solar	Mary Black Suarez, Edgar Cuevas, and Camilo Hernández	October 9, 2020
6	"Cambios"	Javier Solar	Mary Black Suarez, Edgar Cuevas, and Camilo Hernández	October 9, 2020
7	"Todo o nada"	Javier Solar	Mary Black Suarez, Edgar Cuevas, and Camilo Hernández	October 9, 2020
8	"No te puedes bañar sin mojarte"	Javier Solar	Mary Black Suarez, Edgar Cuevas, and Camilo Hernández	October 9, 2020
9	"Rebeldes sin causa"	Javier Solar	Mary Black Suarez, Edgar Cuevas, and Camilo Hernández	October 9, 2020
10	"El mundo de Edgardo"	Javier Solar	Mary Black Suarez, Edgar Cuevas, and Camilo Hernández	October 9, 2020
11	"Abriendo fronteras"	Javier Solar	Mary Black Suarez, Edgar Cuevas, and Camilo Hernández	October 9, 2020
12	"A volar"	Javier Solar	Mary Black Suarez, Edgar Cuevas, and Camilo Hernández	October 9, 2020
13	"Tocando fondo"	Javier Solar	Mary Black Suarez, Edgar Cuevas, and Camilo Hernández	October 9, 2020
14	"Mil ángeles… y mil demonios"	Javier Solar	Mary Black Suarez, Edgar Cuevas, and Camilo Hernández	October 9, 2020
15	"Una aventura llamada Menudo"	Javier Solar	Mary Black Suarez, Edgar Cuevas, and Camilo Hernández	October 9, 2020

== Production ==
In July 2019, SOMOS Productions, Endemol Shine Boomdog, and Piñolywood Studios announced the production of Súbete a Mi Moto. The series was filmed in Mexico and Puerto Rico.

== Reception ==
On the review aggregation website Tomatazos, the first season has a positive score of 75%. The website's critical consensus summary states, "A good trip to the past that recalls a band that defined the youth of a certain public, but that doesn't ignore the darkest moments in the lives of its members."
