= Joselo Vega =

Puerto Rican dancer (born 1962)

José Luis "Josélo" Vega (born May 11, 1962) is a Puerto Rican dancer and choreographer, who is best known for his involvement with boy band Menudo, as their choreographer and second-in-command, after band creator and manager Edgardo Diaz. He was also the band's creative director. Vega is also known for his involvement in the career of former Menudo member Ricky Martin.

== Early life ==
Vega was born in 1962.

== Career ==
Vega was discovered at the age of 15 by Menudo's original choreographer, Beddie Rodriguez, who took him under Rodriguez's wing.

Rodriguez suddenly and unexpectedly decided to leave the band, leaving Vega as the band's main choreographer.

Vega worked with the band for 14 years, starting in 1977 and going through the group's golden era when they reached fame in Puerto Rico, the rest of Latin America, the United States, Spain and Asia. He traveled the world and met Ricky Martin while working with Menudo. Many band members have said that Vega was like a brother to them. Former Menudo member, Venezuelan Jonathan Montenegro, went on record on a You Tube show named "Chisme No Like" to describe Vega as "a being of light" and said he wanted to set Vega as a person apart from the allegations involving other members of Menudo's management.

In 1991 Vega left the band amid a scandal involving drugs and sex abuse allegations. Members Sergio Gonzalez and Ruben Gomez had been caught with marijuana at Miami International Airport and former band member Ralphy Rodriguez later went on a popular Univision television show to allege that there had been sexual abuse from the band's management to band members. During that show, Diaz specifically mentioned Vega, declaring that "in reality, the person who spent the most time with Menudo, and who was constantly with Menudo, was José Luis Vega, ok? He was Menudo's choreographer, ok? This mister (Vega) was who really spent the most time with Menudo, during every era of Menudo, and that's known by all the fans and everyone that has seen it". (in Spanish)

Vega went to live in Mexico, where he became the choreographer of the famous Mexican singer and actress, Yuri. He later collaborated with Ricky Martin; the pair have been friends since Martin entered Menudo in 1984.

== In popular culture ==
Vega is played by Cuban actor and singer Sian Chiong in the Amazon series, "Subete a mi Moto", which is about Menudo.

== See also ==
- List of Puerto Ricans
