= Julio Camejo =

Cuban Mexican actor and dancer

- Born: Julio Antonio Sánchez González; 1967 (age 58–59); Havana, Cuba
- Occupations: Actor & Dancer
- Years active: 1999-present
- Website: Official site

Julio Camejo (Spanish pronunciation: [kaˈmexo]) (born Julio Antonio Sánchez González in Havana, Cuba) is a Cuban Mexican actor and dancer. He has done several Mexican soap operas. He is best known for his role of Veneno in the telenovela Contra viento y marea and Francisco in Destilando Amor.

== Filmography ==
=== Television ===
Year	Title	Role	Notes
2000-01	Primer amor, a mil por hora	Pablo	Special Appearance
2001	Aventuras en el tiempo	Tony	Supporting Role
2001-02	Salomé	Abel	Supporting Role
2002-03	¡Vivan los niños!	Daniel	Supporting Role
2002-03	Clase 406	Douglas Cifuentes	Antagonist
2003	De pocas, pocas pulgas	Noel	Special Appearance
2004	Amar otra vez	Mateo Santillán Vidal	Supporting Role
2004	Big Brother VIP 3	Himself	Reality show; 12th place
2004-06	Rebelde	Mauro Mansilla	Special Appearance
2005	Contra viento y marea	Saúl Trejo "Veneno"	Antagonist
2006	Bailando por la boda de mis sueños	Himself	Reality show; 6th place
2006-07	Amar sin límites	Paco Torres	Supporting Role
2007	Destilando Amor	Francisco de la Vega Chávez	Antagonist
2007-08	Tormenta en el Paraiso	José Miguel Díaz Luna	Supporting Role
2008-09	Mañana es para siempre	Herminio	Special Appearance
2010-11	Niña de mi Corazon	Jason "Papi" Bravo López	Antagonist
2012-13	Amores Verdaderos	Leonardo Solís	Antagonist
2014-15	Hasta el fin del mundo	Matías Escudero	Supporting role
2018; 2023	Reto 4 elementos	Himself	19th place (season 1) 9th place (season 4)
2018-2019	La Taxista	Rodrigo Monreal	Antagonist
2019-2020	Médicos	Anibal	Special Appearance
2020-2021	La mexicana y el güero	Mario Nava	Co-protagonist
2022	MTV RE$I$TIRÉ	Himself	Reality show; 15th place
2022	Inseparables: amor al límite	Himself	Reality show; runner-up
2022	MasterChef (Mexican TV series)	Himself	Reality show; 18th place
2023	La isla: El reality	Himself	Reality show; 5th place
2026	Survivor (Mexican TV series)	Himself	Reality show; 6th place
2026	La Granja VIP	Himself	Reality show; participating

== Series ==
Year	Title
1999	Tabu
2002	Mujer, casos de la vida real
