= A.B. Quintanilla discography =

- Studio albums: 9
- Live albums: 2
- Compilation albums: 9
- Singles: 33
- Video albums: 4
- Music videos: 33
- Remix albums: 2

Mexican-American musician A.B. Quintanilla has released nine studio albums, two live albums, nine compilation albums, two remix albums, and thirty-three singles.

A.B. Quintanilla has achieved ten top 10 albums on the US Top Latin Albums chart with three of them being number 1 albums.

== Albums ==
=== Studio albums ===
List of studio albums, with selected chart positions, sales figures and certifications
Title	Album details	Peak chart positions				Sales	Certifications
Title	Album details	US	US Latin	US Latin Pop	US Regional Mexican	Sales	Certifications
Amor, Familia y Respeto	Released: March 23, 1999; Label: EMI Latin; Format: CD, cassette, digital download	— (Note: Amor, Familia y Respeto did not enter the Billboard 200 chart but peaked on the Top Heatseekers chart at number 18.)	6	2	—	WW: 1,000,000	RIAA: Gold; AMPROFON: Platinum
Shhh!	Released: February 27, 2001; Label: EMI Latin; Format: CD, digital download	92	1	1	—		RIAA: Gold; AMPROFON: Gold
4	Released: February 25, 2003; Label: EMI Latin; Format: CD, digital download	86	1	1	—		RIAA: 2× Platinum (Latin)
Fuego	Released: October 5, 2004; Label: EMI Latin; Format: CD, digital download	89	2	2	—		RIAA: 4× Platinum (Latin); AMPROFON: 2× Platinum
Ayer Fue Kumbia Kings, Hoy Es Kumbia All Starz	Released: October 3, 2006; Label: EMI Latin; Format: CD, digital download	68	2	1	—	US: 200,000	AMPROFON: Gold
Planeta Kumbia	Released: March 4, 2008; Label: EMI Latin; Format: CD, digital download	148	4	2	—		
La Vida de un Genio	Released: July 27, 2010; Label: EMI Latin, Capitol Latin; Format: CD, digital download	—	9	—	3		
Blanco y Negro	Released: September 17, 2013; Label: Universal Music Latin, Siente Music; Format: CD, digital download	—	18	4	—		
Elektro Kumbia	Released: June 30, 2017; Label: DEL; Format: CD, digital download	—	—	—	—		
"—" denotes releases that did not chart or were not released in that territory.

=== Live albums ===
List of live albums, with selected chart positions, sales figures and certifications
Title	Album details	Peak chart positions			Certifications
Title	Album details	US	US Latin	US Latin Pop	Certifications
Kumbia Kings Live	Released: April 4, 2006; Label: EMI Latin; Format: CD, digital download	—	18	8	RIAA: Platinum (Latin); AMPROFON: Gold
Éxitos en Vivo	Released: June 20, 2014; Label: Q-Productions; Format: CD, digital download	—	—	—	
"—" denotes releases that did not chart or were not released in that territory.

=== Remix albums ===
List of remix albums, with selected chart positions, sales figures and certifications
Title	Album details	Peak chart positions				Certifications
Title	Album details	US	US Latin	US Latin Pop	US Dance/ Electronic	Certifications
All Mixed Up: Los Remixes	Released: October 29, 2002; Label: EMI Latin; Format: CD, digital download	137	3	2	2	RIAA: Platinum (Latin)
Los Remixes 2.0	Released: April 6, 2004; Label: EMI Latin; Format: CD, digital download	—	11	3	3	RIAA: Platinum (Latin)
"—" denotes releases that did not chart or were not released in that territory.

=== Compilation albums ===
List of compilation albums, with selected chart positions, sales figures and certifications
Title	Album details	Peak chart positions			Certifications
Title	Album details	US	US Latin	US Latin Pop	Certifications
Presents Kumbia Kings	Released: April 1, 2003; Label: EMI Latin; Format: CD, digital download	—	—	—	
La Historia	Released: October 21, 2003; Label: EMI Latin; Format: CD, digital download	109	1	1	RIAA: 2× Platinum (Latin)
Duetos	Released: March 29, 2005; Label: EMI Latin; Format: CD, digital download	—	11	3	RIAA: Platinum (Latin)
Greatest Hits	Released: April 3, 2007; Label: EMI Latin; Format: CD, digital download	147	7	2	
Lo Mejor de A.B. Quintanilla III y Los Kumbia Kings	Released: July 1, 2016; Label: Capitol Latin; Format: CD, digital download	—	—	13	
Lo Más Romántico de A.B. Quintanilla III	Released: January 22, 2021; Label: Capitol Latin; Format: Digital download, streaming	—	—	—	
Las Retro Chingonas	Released: June 10, 2022; Label: UMG; Format: Streaming	—	—	—	
The Best of Kumbia Kings	Released: June 30, 2023; Label: UMG; Format: Streaming	—	—	—	
Lo Mejor de Dos Grandes (with Big Circo)	Released: October 30, 2023; Label: UMG; Format: Streaming	—	—	—	
Cumbias de Verano	Released: June 24, 2024; Label: UMG; Format: Streaming; Track listing: 1. "Na Na Na (Dulce Niña)" – 3:27; 2. "Fuiste Mala" (featuring Ricky Muñoz of Intocable) – 3:18; 3. "Te Quiero a Ti" – 3:16; 4. "Sabes a Chocolate" – 3:47; 5. "Fuego" – 3:42; 6. "Chiquilla" (A.B. Quintanilla III y Los Kumbia All Starz) – 3:30; 7. "Desde Que No Estás Aquí" – 3:41; 8. "Azúcar" (featuring Fito Olivares) – 3:30; 9. "Shhh!" – 3:50; 10. "Me Enamoré" – 3:23; 11. "Boom Boom" – 4:16; 12. "Dime Quién" – 3:22; 13. "Se Fue Mi Amor" – 3:06; 14. "No Tengo Dinero" (featuring Juan Gabriel and El Gran Silencio) – 4:56; 15. "Tú y Yo (Cumbia Remix)" (Thalía featuring A.B. Quintanilla III y Los Kumbia Kings) – 3:52	—	—	—	
"—" denotes releases that did not chart or were not released in that territory.

=== Video albums ===
Title	Album details
La Historia	Released: October 21, 2003; Label: EMI Latin; Format: DVD
Kumbia Kings Live	Released: April 6, 2006; Label: EMI Latin; Format: DVD
Greatest Hits	Released: September 18, 2007; Label: EMI Latin; Format: DVD
Éxitos en Vivo	Released: June 20, 2014; Label: Q-Productions; Formats: DVD, digital download

== Singles ==
=== As lead artist ===
Title	Year	Peak chart positions							Album
Title	Year	US	US Latin	US Latin Pop	US Latin Rhythm	US Regional Mexican	US Tropical	US Rhythmic	Album
"Azúcar" (featuring Fito Olivares)	1999	—	—	—	—	—	—	—	Amor, Familia y Respeto
"Reggae Kumbia" (featuring Vico C)	1999	—	—	—	—	—	—	—	Amor, Familia y Respeto
"Fuiste Mala" (featuring Intocable)	1999	—	—	—	—	13	—	—	Amor, Familia y Respeto
"Te Quiero a Ti"	1999	—	—	—	—	17	—	—	Amor, Familia y Respeto
"Se Fue Mi Amor"	2000	—	—	—	—	20	—	—	Amor, Familia y Respeto
"U Don't Love Me"	2000	62	—	—	—	—	—	12	Amor, Familia y Respeto
"Dime Quién"	2000	—	—	—	—	27	—	—	Amor, Familia y Respeto
"Boom Boom"	2001	—	—	—	—	20	—	—	Shhh!
"Shhh!"	2001	—	23	30	—	12	22	—	Shhh!
"Desde Que No Estás Aquí"	2002	—	—	—	—	23	—	—	Shhh!
"La Cucaracha"	2002	—	—	—	—	32	—	—	All Mixed Up: Los Remixes
"No Tengo Dinero" (featuring Juan Gabriel and El Gran Silencio)	2003	—	5	32	—	6	9	—	4
"Insomnio"	2003	—	—	—	—	40	—	—	4
"Mi Gente" (featuring Ozomatli)	2003	—	28	40	—	7	—	—	4
"Sabes a Chocolate"	2004	—	42	—	—	18	—	—	Los Remixes 2.0
"Fuego"	2004	—	13	36	—	5	—	—	Fuego
"Baila Esta Kumbia" (featuring Selena)	2005	—	44	—	—	16	—	—	Duetos
"Na Na Na (Dulce Niña)"	2005	—	6	21	25	12	11	—	Fuego
"Parte de Mi Corazón" (featuring Noel Schajris of Sin Bandera)	2005	—	38	—	—	22	—	—	Fuego
"Pachuco"	2006	—	—	—	—	28	—	—	Kumbia Kings Live
"Chiquilla"	2006	—	7	26	31	9	31	—	Ayer Fue Kumbia Kings, Hoy Es Kumbia All Starz
"Parece Que Va a Llover"	2007	—	—	—	—	33	—	—	Ayer Fue Kumbia Kings, Hoy Es Kumbia All Starz
"Speedy Gonzales"	2007	—	—	—	—	—	—	—	Ayer Fue Kumbia Kings, Hoy Es Kumbia All Starz
"Mami–Anoche No Dormí"	2007	—	—	—	—	—	—	—	Ayer Fue Kumbia Kings, Hoy Es Kumbia All Starz
"Por Ti Baby" (featuring Flex)	2008	—	23	—	6	—	—	—	Planeta Kumbia
"Rica y Apretadita" (featuring Melissa Jiménez)	2008	—	50	—	17	34	—	—	Planeta Kumbia
"Hipnótika" (featuring Voltio and Marciano Cantero from Los Enanitos Verdes)	2010	—	—	—	27	—	—	—	La Vida de un Genio
"Mentirosa" (featuring T López and Yeyo from The D.E.Y.)	2010	—	—	—	—	—	—	—	La Vida de un Genio
"Solo"	2012	—	—	—	—	—	—	—	Blanco y Negro
"Blanco y Negro"	2013	—	—	—	—	—	—	—	Blanco y Negro
"Piña Colada Shot"	2017	—	—	—	—	—	—	—	Elektro Kumbia
"La Aventura" (featuring Saga y Sonyc)	2017	—	—	—	—	—	—	—	Elektro Kumbia
"Pasito Tun Tun" (featuring Claudio Yarto)	2017	—	—	—	—	—	—	—	Elektro Kumbia
"La Kumbia Buena" (featuring Ricky Rick, Neto Peña, and Yoss Bones)	2021	—	—	—	—	—	—	—	Non-album single
"Por Ti Baby (Live Version)" (A.B. Quintanilla, Ricky Rick, Kumbia All Starz)	2022	—	—	—	—	—	—	—	Non-album single
"Abrázame y Bésame" (Angela Leiva, Manny C, and A.B. Quintanilla)	2022	—	—	—	—	—	—	—	Non-album single
"Parece Que Va a Llover (Live Version)" (A.B. Quintanilla, Ricky Rick, Kumbia All Starz)	2022	—	—	—	—	—	—	—	Non-album single
"Muero Por Ti (Live)" (A.B. Quintanilla, Damas Gratis, Karina)	2023	—	—	—	—	—	—	—	Non-album single
"No Tengo Dinero (Versión Caporal)" (featuring Ale Zen)	2024	—	—	—	—	—	—	—	Non-album single
"Invisible (Versión Caporal)" (featuring Ale Zen)	2024	—	—	—	—	—	—	—	Non-album single
"El Rey de la Kumbia" (featuring Lefty Sm and Zeri)	2024	—	—	—	—	—	—	—	Non-album single
"Dulce Niña/Chiquilla" (featuring Valentino Merlo)	2024	—	—	—	—	—	—	—	Non-album single
"Yo No Fui" (featuring El Frizian and Neto Peña)	2024	—	—	—	—	—	—	—	Non-album single
"—" denotes a recording that did not chart or was not released in that territory.

=== Promotional singles ===
Title	Year	Peak chart positions							Album
Title	Year	US	US Latin	US Latin Pop	US Latin Rhythm	US Regional Mexican	US Tropical	US Rhythmic	Album
"Mamacita Dónde Está Santa Claus"	2007	—	—	—	—	—	—	—	Ayer Fue Kumbia Kings, Hoy Es Kumbia All Starz (Fan Edition)
"—" denotes a recording that did not chart or was not released in that territory.

=== As featured artist ===
Title	Year	Peak chart positions							Album
Title	Year	US	US Latin	US Latin Pop	US Latin Rhythm	US Regional Mexican	US Tropical	US Rhythmic	Album
"Tú y Yo (Cumbia Remix)" (Thalía featuring A.B. Quintanilla & Kumbia Kings)	2002	—	—	—	—	—	—	—	Thalía (2002)
"Jaleo (Kumbia Remix)" (Ricky Martin featuring A.B. Quintanilla & Kumbia Kings)	2003	—	—	—	—	—	—	—	Almas del Silencio
"Somos El Mundo 25 Por Haiti" (among Artists for Haiti)	2010	115	—	—	—	—	—	—	Non-album single
"Que Cante la Vida" (among Artists for Chile)	2010	—	—	—	—	—	—	—	Non-album single
"Volveras" (Los de Ajayu Jacha featuring A.B. Quintanilla and Ricky Rick)	2021	—	—	—	—	—	—	—	Non-album single
"Pelón" (Los Boyz of Kumbia featuring A.B. Quintanilla and Ricky Rick)	2021	—	—	—	—	38	—	—	Non-album single
"Pelón (Live)" (Los Boyz of Kumbia featuring A.B. Quintanilla)	2021	—	—	—	—	—	—	—	Non-album single
"Porque Le Gusta Bailar Cumbia" (Los Boyz of Kumbia featuring A.B. Quintanilla and Pete Astudillo)	2021	—	—	—	—	—	—	—	Non-album single
"Ella Bella" (Tino Cochino featuring A.B. Quintanilla and Ztein McFly)	2022	—	—	—	—	—	—	—	Non-album single
"Sin Tí" (Jordan featuring A.B. Quintanilla and Manny C)	2022	—	—	—	—	—	—	—	Non-album single
"Es Viernes" (Banda MS featuring A.B. Quintanilla)	2023	—	—	—	—	—	—	—	Non-album single
"Esta Noche" (Valentina Márquez featuring A.B. Quintanilla)	2024	—	—	—	—	—	—	—	Non-album single
"—" denotes a recording that did not chart or was not released in that territory.

== Music videos ==
Title	Year	Album	Other performer(s) credited	Director(s)	Description	Ref(s)
"Azúcar"	1999	Amor, Familia y Respeto	None	Unknown	A.B. Quintanilla & Kumbia Kings perform the songs with models.	
"Reggae Kumbia"	1999	Amor, Familia y Respeto	Vico C	Unknown	A.B. Quintanilla & Kumbia Kings perform the song with Vico C at a beach. Footage of them performing the song live is also included.	
"Fuiste Mala"	1999	Amor, Familia y Respeto	Ricky Muñoz of Intocable	Unknown	A.B. Quintanilla & Kumbia Kings perform the song with Ricky Muñoz. Black-and-white music video.	
"Te Quiero a Ti"	1999	Amor, Familia y Respeto	None	Unknown	Footage of A.B. Quintanilla & Kumbia Kings performing the song live at a concert with the studio recording dubbing the footage.	
"Se Fue Mi Amor"	2000	Amor, Familia y Respeto	None	Unknown	Video begins with a written message by A.B. Quintanilla dedicating the video to the fans for supporting them and saying without them there would be no Kumbia Kings. Compilation of A.B. Quintanilla & Kumbia Kings on tour, performing live, meeting with fans, while the song plays.	
"U Don't Love Me"	2000	Amor, Familia y Respeto	None	Unknown	A.B. Quintanilla & Kumbia Kings perform the song. A couple is shown in the video.	
"Boom Boom"	2001	Shhh!	None	Unknown	A.B. Quintanilla & Kumbia Kings perform the song. Video takes place in a high school.	
"Shhh!"	2001	Shhh!	None	Unknown	A.B. Quintanilla & Kumbia Kings perform the song. A bride and her family are shown in the video.	
"Desde Que No Estás Aquí"	2002	Shhh!	None	Unknown	Animated music video. Cartoon versions of the members are shown.	
"Tú y Yo (Cumbia Remix)"	2002	Thalía (2002)	Thalía	Leche; Antti Jokinen	Thalía performs the song and A.B. Quintanilla & Kumbia Kings perform their verses in different scenes.	
"La Cucaracha"	2002	All Mixed Up: Los Remixes	None	Unknown	A disclaimer is used in the beginning of the video. A.B. Quintanilla & Kumbia Kings perform the song in a city. Parodies of television shows are shown.	
"No Tengo Dinero"	2003	4	Juan Gabriel; El Gran Silencio	Unknown	Children dance and lip sync to the song. Features appearances by Alyson Stoner, Monica Parales, and Adam G. Sevani. A.B. Quintanilla & Kumbia Kings, Juan Gabriel, and El Gran Silencio do not appear in the video.	
"Insomnio"	2003	4	None	Unknown	A.B. Quintanilla & Kumbia Kings perform the song. Features Ecuadorian model Paola Miranda. Black-and-white music video. Recorded in Miami, Florida, United States.	
"Mi Gente"	2003	4	Ozomatli	Unknown	A.B. Quintanilla & Kumbia Kings and Ozomatli perform the song in a street with a crowd. Footage of Mexican people working, protesting for the civil rights of Latinos, and experiencing racism and police brutality is shown.	
"Sabes a Chocolate"	2004	Los Remixes 2.0	None	Unknown	A.B. Quintanilla & Kumbia Kings perform the song on a beach with Pee Wee singing the main vocals. First Kumbia Kings music video to feature the new members of the group after the shakeup of 2003.	
"Fuego"	2004	Fuego	None	Unknown	A.B. Quintanilla & Kumbia Kings perform the song in a club. Video takes place in Tokyo, Japan.	
"Baila Esta Kumbia"	2005	Duetos	Selena	Unknown	A.B. Quintanilla gives an intro thanking the fans for keeping the legacy of his sister, Selena, alive. An animated version of Selena performs. A.B. Quintanilla & Kumbia Kings sing and dance to the song. Film reel effect is used throughout the video.	
"Na Na Na (Dulce Niña)"	2005	Fuego	None	Unknown	A.B. Quintanilla & Kumbia Kings perform the song. A.B. Quintanilla, Pee Wee and the rest of the Kumbia Kings are dressed in mariachi outfits. A baby girl is shown being born, follow by a child couple in elementary school, then an adult couple getting married. Pee Wee and his girlfriend are in the movie theater. Video is in color with black-and-white snippets.	
"Na Na Na (Dulce Niña) (Remix)"	2005	None	None	Unknown	A.B. Quintanilla & Kumbia Kings perform the song in a hotel.	
"Parte de Mi Corazón (Kumbia Version)"	2005	Fuego	Noel Schajris of Sin Bandera	Conrado Martínez	A.B. Quintanilla & Kumbia Kings perform with Noel Schajris. Schajris plays the piano. A woman is featured throughout the video. The kumbia version of the music video is slightly longer than the ballad version. The kumbia version of the music video was less played on music video channels on television than compared to the ballad version.	
"Parte de Mi Corazón (Ballad Version)"	2005	Fuego	Noel Schajris of Sin Bandera	Conrado Martínez	A.B. Quintanilla & Kumbia Kings perform with Noel Schajris. Schajris plays the piano. A woman is featured throughout the video. The ballad version of the music video is slightly shorter than the kumbia version. The ballad version of the music video was the one which was mostly played on music video channels on television than compared to the kumbia version.	
"Pachuco"	2006	Kumbia Kings Live	None	Unknown	A.B. Quintanilla & Kumbia Kings perform the song. Members of Kumbia Kings dance. Chris Pérez performs a guitar solo.	
"Chiquilla"	2006	Ayer Fue Kumbia Kings, Hoy Es Kumbia All Starz	None	Unknown	A.B. Quintanilla & Kumbia All Starz perform the song. Pee Wee portrays a poor worker who is in love with a rich girl.	
"Parece Que Va a Llover"	2007	Ayer Fue Kumbia Kings, Hoy Es Kumbia All Starz	None	Unknown	A.B. Quintanilla & Kumbia All Starz perform the song with policewomen. Some members also perform the song while riding a motorcycle.	
"Speedy Gonzales"	2007	Ayer Fue Kumbia Kings, Hoy Es Kumbia All Starz	None	Unknown	Animated intro with Speedy Gonzales. Spoken intro by A.B. Quintanilla. A.B. Quintanilla & Kumbia All Starz perform the song at a party. An animated version of Speedy Gonzales is used with the live action video.	
"Mami–Anoche No Dormí"	2007	Ayer Fue Kumbia Kings, Hoy Es Kumbia All Starz	None	Unknown	A.B. Quintanilla & Kumbia All Starz perform the songs at a beach.	
"Mamacita Dónde Está Santa Claus"	2007	Ayer Fue Kumbia Kings, Hoy Es Kumbia All Starz (Fan Edition)	None	Unknown	Kumbia All Starz perform the song at a Christmas party. A.B. Quintanilla does not appear in the video.	
"Por Ti Baby"	2008	Planeta Kumbia	Flex	Unknown	A.B. Quintanilla & Kumbia All Starz perform the song with Flex in a club. Also featured is A.B. Quintanilla's girlfriend at the time, Elizabeth Olsen (not to be confused with the actress of the same name), an American woman who he met in Puerto Rico and speaks Spanish. Video begins with the intro for Planeta Kumbia. Recorded in Argentina.	
"Rica y Apretadita"	2008	Planeta Kumbia	Melissa Jiménez	Unknown	A.B. Quintanilla & Kumbia All Starz perform the song with Melissa Jiménez. Also included are three female dancers and one male dancer. Recorded in Argentina.	
"Somos El Mundo 25 Por Haiti"	2010	None	Artists for Haiti	Unknown	Artists for Haiti perform the song as a group in a room.	
"Que Cante la Vida"	2010	None	Artists for Chile	Unknown	Artists for Chile perform the song in a television screen platform with a clip of each artist performing their verse.	
"Hipnótika"	2010	La Vida de un Genio	Voltio; Marciano Cantero from Los Enanitos Verdes	Unknown	A.B. Quintanilla & Kumbia All Starz perform the song with Voltio and Marciano Cantero. This is the first video by A.B. Quintanilla to feature lead singer DJ Kane since the video for "Mi Gente" in 2003.	
"Solo"	2012	Blanco y Negro	None	Suzette Quintanilla	A.B. Quintanilla & Kumbia All Starz perform the song. Features A.B. Quintanilla's then-wife, Rikkie Leigh Robertson, as a DJ.	
"Blanco y Negro"	2013	Blanco y Negro	None	Mark Muñoz	A.B. Quintanilla & Kumbia All Starz perform the song separately in a different room. A model is shown throughout the video. Black-and-white video.	
"Blanco y Negro" (Director's Cut)	2013	Blanco y Negro	None	Mark Muñoz	A.B. Quintanilla & Kumbia All Starz perform the song separately in a different room. A member of the band is added to the video who was removed from the original video due to him leaving the band. A second model is also shown throughout the video. Unused footage is added to the video. Black-and-white video.	
"Piña Colada Shot"	2017	Elektro Kumbia	None	Unknown	A.B. Quintanilla & Kumbia All Starz (as Elektro Kumbia) perform the song on a boat and beach.	
"La Aventura"	2017	Elektro Kumbia	Saga y Sonyc	Unknown	A.B. Quintanilla & Kumbia All Starz (as Elektro Kumbia) perform the song with Saga y Sonyc.	
"Pasito Tun Tun"	2017	Elektro Kumbia	Claudio Yarto	Unknown	A.B. Quintanilla & Kumbia All Starz (as Elektro Kumbia) perform the song in a club with Claudio Yarto.	
