= Kumbia Kings discography =

- Studio albums: 4
- Live albums: 1
- Compilation albums: 7
- Singles: 22
- Video albums: 3
- Music videos: 21
- Remix albums: 2

The discography of Mexican-American cumbia group Los Kumbia Kings consists of four studio albums, one live album, seven compilation albums, two remix albums, three video albums, twenty-two singles and twenty-one music videos.

== Albums ==
=== Studio albums ===
List of studio albums, with selected chart positions, sales figures and certifications
| Title | Album details | Peak chart positions | | | Sales | Certifications |
| Title | Album details | US | US Latin | US Latin Pop | Sales | Certifications |
|---|---|---|---|---|---|---|
| Amor, Familia y Respeto | Released: March 23, 1999; Label: EMI Latin; Format: CD, cassette, digital download | — (Note: Amor, Familia y Respeto did not enter the Billboard 200 chart but peaked on the Top Heatseekers chart at number 18.) | 6 | 2 | WW: 1,000,000 | RIAA: Gold; AMPROFON: Platinum |
| Shhh! | Released: February 27, 2001; Label: EMI Latin; Format: CD, digital download | 92 | 1 | 1 | | RIAA: Gold; AMPROFON: Gold |
| 4 | Released: February 25, 2003; Label: EMI Latin; Format: CD, digital download | 86 | 1 | 1 | | RIAA: 2× Platinum (Latin) |
| Fuego | Released: October 5, 2004; Label: EMI Latin; Format: CD, digital download | 89 | 2 | 2 | | RIAA: 4× Platinum (Latin); AMPROFON: 2× Platinum |
"—" denotes releases that did not chart or were not released in that territory.

=== Live albums ===
List of live albums, with selected chart positions, sales figures and certifications
| Title | Album details | Peak chart positions | | | Certifications |
| Title | Album details | US | US Latin | US Latin Pop | Certifications |
|---|---|---|---|---|---|
| Kumbia Kings Live | Released: April 4, 2006; Label: EMI Latin; Format: CD, digital download | — | 18 | 8 | RIAA: Platinum (Latin); AMPROFON: Gold |
"—" denotes releases that did not chart or were not released in that territory.

=== Remix albums ===
List of remix albums, with selected chart positions, sales figures and certifications
| Title | Album details | Peak chart positions | | | | Certifications |
| Title | Album details | US | US Latin | US Latin Pop | US Dance/ Electronic | Certifications |
|---|---|---|---|---|---|---|
| All Mixed Up: Los Remixes | Released: October 29, 2002; Label: EMI Latin; Format: CD, digital download | 137 | 3 | 2 | 2 | RIAA: Platinum (Latin) |
| Los Remixes 2.0 | Released: April 6, 2004; Label: EMI Latin; Format: CD, digital download | — | 11 | 3 | 3 | RIAA: Platinum (Latin) |
"—" denotes releases that did not chart or were not released in that territory.

=== Compilation albums ===
List of compilation albums, with selected chart positions, sales figures and certifications
| Title | Album details | Peak chart positions | | | Certifications |
| Title | Album details | US | US Latin | US Latin Pop | Certifications |
|---|---|---|---|---|---|
| Presents Kumbia Kings | Released: April 1, 2003; Label: EMI Latin; Format: CD, digital download | — | — | — | |
| La Historia | Released: October 21, 2003; Label: EMI Latin; Format: CD, digital download | 109 | 1 | 1 | RIAA: 2× Platinum (Latin) |
| Duetos | Released: March 29, 2005; Label: EMI Latin; Format: CD, digital download | — | 11 | 3 | RIAA: Platinum (Latin) |
| Greatest Hits | Released: April 3, 2007; Label: EMI Latin; Format: CD, digital download | 147 | 7 | 2 | |
| Lo Mejor de A.B. Quintanilla III y Los Kumbia Kings | Released: July 1, 2016; Label: Capitol Latin; Format: CD, digital download | — | — | 13 | |
| The Best of Kumbia Kings | Released: June 30, 2023; Label: UMG; Format: Streaming | — | — | — | |
| Lo Mejor de Dos Grandes (with Big Circo) | Released: October 30, 2023; Label: UMG; Format: Streaming | — | — | — | |
| Cumbias de Verano | Released: June 24, 2024; Label: UMG; Format: Streaming | — | — | — | |
"—" denotes releases that did not chart or were not released in that territory.

=== Video albums ===
| Title | Album details |
|---|---|
| La Historia | Released: October 21, 2003; Label: EMI Latin; Format: DVD |
| Kumbia Kings Live | Released: April 6, 2006; Label: EMI Latin; Format: DVD |
| Greatest Hits | Released: September 18, 2007; Label: EMI Latin; Format: DVD |

== Singles ==
=== As lead artist ===
| Title | Year | Peak chart positions | | | | | | | Album |
| Title | Year | US | US Latin | US Latin Pop | US Latin Rhythm | US Regional Mexican | US Tropical | US Rhythmic | Album |
|---|---|---|---|---|---|---|---|---|---|
| "Azúcar" (featuring Fito Olivares) | 1999 | — | — | — | — | — | — | — | Amor, Familia y Respeto |
| "Reggae Kumbia" (featuring Vico C) | 1999 | — | — | — | — | — | — | — | Amor, Familia y Respeto |
| "Fuiste Mala" (featuring Intocable) | 1999 | — | — | — | — | 13 | — | — | Amor, Familia y Respeto |
| "Te Quiero a Ti" | 1999 | — | — | — | — | 17 | — | — | Amor, Familia y Respeto |
| "Se Fue Mi Amor" | 2000 | — | — | — | — | 20 | — | — | Amor, Familia y Respeto |
| "U Don't Love Me" | 2000 | 62 | — | — | — | — | — | 12 | Amor, Familia y Respeto |
| "Dime Quién" | 2000 | — | — | — | — | 27 | — | — | Amor, Familia y Respeto |
| "Boom Boom" | 2001 | — | — | — | — | 20 | — | — | Shhh! |
| "Shhh!" | 2001 | — | 23 | 30 | — | 12 | 22 | — | Shhh! |
| "Desde Que No Estás Aquí" | 2002 | — | — | — | — | 23 | — | — | Shhh! |
| "La Cucaracha" | 2002 | — | — | — | — | 32 | — | — | All Mixed Up: Los Remixes |
| "No Tengo Dinero" (featuring Juan Gabriel and El Gran Silencio) | 2003 | — | 5 | 32 | — | 6 | 9 | — | 4 |
| "Insomnio" | 2003 | — | — | — | — | 40 | — | — | 4 |
| "Mi Gente" (featuring Ozomatli) | 2003 | — | 28 | 40 | — | 7 | — | — | 4 |
| "Sabes a Chocolate" | 2004 | — | 42 | — | — | 18 | — | — | Los Remixes 2.0 |
| "Fuego" | 2004 | — | 13 | 36 | — | 5 | — | — | Fuego |
| "Baila Esta Kumbia" (featuring Selena) | 2005 | — | 44 | — | — | 16 | — | — | Duetos |
| "Na Na Na (Dulce Niña)" | 2005 | — | 6 | 21 | 25 | 12 | 11 | — | Fuego |
| "Parte de Mi Corazón" (featuring Noel Schajris of Sin Bandera) | 2005 | — | 38 | — | — | 22 | — | — | Fuego |
| "Pachuco" | 2006 | — | — | — | — | 28 | — | — | Kumbia Kings Live |
"—" denotes a recording that did not chart or was not released in that territory.

=== As featured artist ===
| Title | Year | Peak chart positions | | | | | | | Album |
| Title | Year | US | US Latin | US Latin Pop | US Latin Rhythm | US Regional Mexican | US Tropical | US Rhythmic | Album |
|---|---|---|---|---|---|---|---|---|---|
| "Tú y Yo (Cumbia Remix)" (Thalía featuring A.B. Quintanilla & Kumbia Kings) | 2002 | — | — | — | — | — | — | — | Thalía (2002) |
| "Jaleo (Kumbia Remix)" (Ricky Martin featuring A.B. Quintanilla & Kumbia Kings) | 2003 | — | — | — | — | — | — | — | Almas del Silencio |
"—" denotes a recording that did not chart or was not released in that territory.

== Music videos ==
| Title | Year | Album | Other performer(s) credited | Director(s) | Description | Ref(s) |
|---|---|---|---|---|---|---|
| "Azúcar" | 1999 | Amor, Familia y Respeto | None | Unknown | A.B. Quintanilla & Kumbia Kings perform the songs with models. | |
| "Reggae Kumbia" | 1999 | Amor, Familia y Respeto | Vico C | Unknown | A.B. Quintanilla & Kumbia Kings perform the song with Vico C at a beach. Footage of them performing the song live is also included. | |
| "Fuiste Mala" | 1999 | Amor, Familia y Respeto | Ricky Muñoz of Intocable | Unknown | A.B. Quintanilla & Kumbia Kings perform the song with Ricky Muñoz. Black-and-white music video. | |
| "Te Quiero a Ti" | 1999 | Amor, Familia y Respeto | None | Unknown | Footage of A.B. Quintanilla & Kumbia Kings performing the song live at a concert with the studio recording dubbing the footage. | |
| "Se Fue Mi Amor" | 2000 | Amor, Familia y Respeto | None | Unknown | Video begins with a written message by A.B. Quintanilla dedicating the video to the fans for supporting them and saying without them there would be no Kumbia Kings. Compilation of A.B. Quintanilla & Kumbia Kings on tour, performing live, meeting with fans, while the song plays. | |
| "U Don't Love Me" | 2000 | Amor, Familia y Respeto | None | Unknown | A.B. Quintanilla & Kumbia Kings perform the song. A couple is shown in the video. | |
| "Boom Boom" | 2001 | Shhh! | None | Unknown | A.B. Quintanilla & Kumbia Kings perform the song. Video takes place in a high school. | |
| "Shhh!" | 2001 | Shhh! | None | Unknown | A.B. Quintanilla & Kumbia Kings perform the song. A bride and her family are shown in the video. | |
| "Desde Que No Estás Aquí" | 2002 | Shhh! | None | Unknown | Animated music video. Cartoon versions of the members are shown. | |
| "Tú y Yo (Cumbia Remix)" | 2002 | Thalía (2002) | Thalía | Leche; Antti Jokinen | Thalía performs the song and A.B. Quintanilla & Kumbia Kings perform their verses in different scenes. | |
| "La Cucaracha" | 2002 | All Mixed Up: Los Remixes | None | Unknown | A disclaimer is used in the beginning of the video. A.B. Quintanilla & Kumbia Kings perform the song in a city. Parodies of television shows are shown. | |
| "No Tengo Dinero" | 2003 | 4 | Juan Gabriel; El Gran Silencio | Unknown | Children dance and lip sync to the song. Features appearances by Alyson Stoner, Monica Parales, and Adam G. Sevani. A.B. Quintanilla & Kumbia Kings, Juan Gabriel, and El Gran Silencio do not appear in the video. | |
| "Insomnio" | 2003 | 4 | None | Unknown | A.B. Quintanilla & Kumbia Kings perform the song. Features Ecuadorian model Paola Miranda. Black-and-white music video. Recorded in Miami, Florida, United States. | |
| "Mi Gente" | 2003 | 4 | Ozomatli | Unknown | A.B. Quintanilla & Kumbia Kings and Ozomatli perform the song in a street with a crowd. Footage of Mexican people working, protesting for the civil rights of Latinos, and experiencing racism and police brutality is shown. | |
| "Sabes a Chocolate" | 2004 | Los Remixes 2.0 | None | Unknown | A.B. Quintanilla & Kumbia Kings perform the song on a beach with Pee Wee singing the main vocals. First Kumbia Kings music video to feature the new members of the group after the shakeup of 2003. | |
| "Fuego" | 2004 | Fuego | None | Unknown | A.B. Quintanilla & Kumbia Kings perform the song in a club. Video takes place in Tokyo, Japan. | |
| "Baila Esta Kumbia" | 2005 | Duetos | Selena | Unknown | A.B. Quintanilla gives an intro thanking the fans for keeping the legacy of his sister, Selena, alive. An animated version of Selena performs. A.B. Quintanilla & Kumbia Kings sing and dance to the song. Film reel effect is used throughout the video. | |
| "Na Na Na (Dulce Niña)" | 2005 | Fuego | None | Unknown | A.B. Quintanilla & Kumbia Kings perform the song. A.B. Quintanilla, Pee Wee and the rest of the Kumbia Kings are dressed in mariachi outfits. A baby girl is shown being born, follow by a child couple in elementary school, then an adult couple getting married. Pee Wee and his girlfriend are in the movie theater. Video is in color with black-and-white snippets. | |
| "Na Na Na (Dulce Niña) (Remix)" | 2005 | None | None | Unknown | A.B. Quintanilla & Kumbia Kings perform the song in a hotel. | |
| "Parte de Mi Corazón (Kumbia Version)" | 2005 | Fuego | Noel Schajris of Sin Bandera | Conrado Martínez | A.B. Quintanilla & Kumbia Kings perform with Noel Schajris. Schajris plays the piano. A woman is featured throughout the video. The kumbia version of the music video is slightly longer than the ballad version. The kumbia version of the music video was less played on music video channels on television than compared to the ballad version. | |
| "Parte de Mi Corazón (Ballad Version)" | 2005 | Fuego | Noel Schajris of Sin Bandera | Conrado Martínez | A.B. Quintanilla & Kumbia Kings perform with Noel Schajris. Schajris plays the piano. A woman is featured throughout the video. The ballad version of the music video is slightly shorter than the kumbia version. The ballad version of the music video was the one which was mostly played on music video channels on television than compared to the kumbia version. | |
| "Pachuco" | 2006 | Kumbia Kings Live | None | Unknown | A.B. Quintanilla & Kumbia Kings perform the song. Members of Kumbia Kings dance. Chris Pérez performs a guitar solo. | |
