= Greatest Hits (Kumbia Kings album) =

Greatest hits album by A.B. Quintanilla y Los Kumbia Kings
- Released: April 3, 2007
- Recorded: 1998–2006
- Genre: Cumbia
- Length: 46:46
- Label: EMI Latin
- Producer: A.B. Quintanilla; Cruz Martínez

A.B. Quintanilla y Los Kumbia Kings chronology
Kumbia Kings Live (2006)	Greatest Hits (2007)	Lo Mejor de A.B. Quintanilla III y Los Kumbia Kings (2016)

Professional ratings
Review scores
Source	Rating
AllMusic	4/5 stars

Greatest Hits is the fourth compilation album and eleventh album by Mexican-American cumbia group A.B. Quintanilla y Los Kumbia Kings. It was released on April 3, 2007, by EMI Latin. Greatest Hits is the first album to be released after the breakup of Kumbia Kings. A DVD that included the music videos of all the songs was released on September 18, 2007.

== Track listing ==
No.	Title	Writer(s)	Length
1.	"Na Na Na (Dulce Niña)"	A.B. Quintanilla III, Cruz Martínez, Luigi Giraldo	3:27
2.	"Fuego"	Quintanilla III, Martínez, Giraldo, Jerry Bloodrock, Selite Evans, Richard Fowler, Charles Pettiford, Gregory Wigfall	3:42
3.	"Sabes a Chocolate"	Carlos Villa De La Torre, Alejandro Monroy Fernández	3:47
4.	"Pachuco"	Lobito, Sax, Aldo, Pacho, Roco, Tiki	3:46
5.	"Mi Gente" (featuring Ozomatli)	Quintanilla III, Asdru Sierra, Jiro Yamaguchi, Raúl Pacheco, Justin Poree, Giraldo, Nir Seroussi	4:24
6.	"No Tengo Dinero" (featuring Juan Gabriel and El Gran Silencio)	Juan Gabriel	4:56
7.	"Shhh!"	Quintanilla III, Cruz Martínez, Giraldo	3:52
8.	"La Cucaracha"	Quintanilla III, Martínez, Jason "DJ Kane" Cano, Nick "DJ Franz" Washington	3:27
9.	"Te Quiero a Ti"	Quintanilla III, Ricky Vela	3:16
10.	"Azúcar" (featuring Fito Olivares)	Quintanilla III, Giraldo, Edward Palmieri	3:30
11.	"Boom Boom"	Quintanilla III, Martínez, Giraldo	4:16
12.	"Baila Esta Kumbia" (featuring Selena)	Quintanilla III, Pete Astudillo	4:23

== Charts ==
Chart (2007)	Peak position
US Billboard 200	147
US Top Latin Albums (Billboard)	7
US Latin Pop Albums (Billboard)	2

== See also ==
- Greatest Hits DVD
