= Lo Mejor de A.B. Quintanilla III y Los Kumbia Kings =

Greatest hits album by A.B. Quintanilla y Los Kumbia Kings
- Released: July 1, 2016
- Recorded: 1998–2006
- Genre: Cumbia
- Length: 67:06
- Label: Capitol Latin, Universal Music Latin Entertainment
- Producer: A.B. Quintanilla; Cruz Martínez

A.B. Quintanilla y Los Kumbia Kings chronology
| Greatest Hits (2007) | Lo Mejor de A.B. Quintanilla III y Los Kumbia Kings (2016) |

Lo Mejor de A.B. Quintanilla III y Los Kumbia Kings (English: The Best of A.B. Quintanilla III and The Kumbia Kings) is the fifth compilation album and twelfth album by Mexican-American cumbia group A.B. Quintanilla y Los Kumbia Kings. It was released on July 1, 2016, by Capitol Latin and Universal Music Latin Entertainment. Lo Mejor de A.B. Quintanilla III y Los Kumbia Kings is the second album to be released after the breakup of Kumbia Kings.

== Track listing ==
| No. | Title | Writer(s) | Length |
|---|---|---|---|
| 1. | "Na Na Na (Dulce Niña)" | A.B. Quintanilla III, Cruz Martínez, Luigi Giraldo | 3:27 |
| 2. | "Pachuco" | Tiki, Aldo Rubén Acuna Yance, Eulalio Cervantes Galarza, Enrique Montes Arellano, Adrián Navarro Maycotte, Rolando Javier Ortega Cuenca, José Luis Paredes Pacho | 3:45 |
| 3. | "Mi Gente" (featuring Ozomatli) | Quintanilla III, Asdru Sierra, Jiro Yamaguchi, Raúl Pacheco, Justin Poree, Giraldo, Nir Seroussi | 4:21 |
| 4. | "No Tengo Dinero" (featuring Juan Gabriel and El Gran Silencio) | Juan Gabriel | 4:53 |
| 5. | "Shhh!" | Quintanilla III, Martínez, Giraldo | 3:50 |
| 6. | "La Cucaracha" | Quintanilla III, Martínez, Jason "DJ Kane" Cano, Nick "DJ Franz" Washington | 3:27 |
| 7. | "Te Quiero a Ti" | Quintanilla III, Ricky Vela | 3:17 |
| 8. | "Azúcar" (featuring Fito Olivares) | Quintanilla III, Giraldo, Edward Palmieri | 3:30 |
| 9. | "Boom Boom" | Quintanilla III, Martínez, Giraldo | 4:14 |
| 10. | "Baila Esta Kumbia" (Live) | Quintanilla III, Pete Astudillo | 3:53 |
| 11. | "Desde Que No Estás Aquí" | Quintanilla III, Giraldo | 3:41 |
| 12. | "Se Fue Mi Amor" | Quintanilla III, Giraldo, Astudillo | 3:06 |
| 13. | "Me Estoy Muriendo" | Quintanilla III, Vela, Giraldo | 3:55 |
| 14. | "Reggae Kumbia" (featuring Vico C) | Quintanilla III, Vico C | 3:52 |
| 15. | "Chiquilla" | Quintanilla III, Giraldo | 3:22 |
| 16. | "Dime Por Qué" | Quintanilla III, Vela | 3:48 |
| 17. | "Dime Quién" | Quintanilla III, Vela | 3:24 |
| 18. | "Me Enamoré" | Quintanilla III, Martínez, Giraldo | 3:21 |

== Charts ==
| Chart (2016) | Peak position |
|---|---|
| US Latin Pop Albums (Billboard) | 13 |
