= Greatest Hits (Kumbia Kings video) =

Video by A.B. Quintanilla y Los Kumbia Kings
- Released: September 18, 2007
- Recorded: 1999–2006
- Genre: Cumbia
- Length: 47:29
- Label: EMI Televisa

A.B. Quintanilla y Los Kumbia Kings chronology
| Kumbia Kings Live (2006) | Greatest Hits (2007) |

Greatest Hits is a DVD by A.B. Quintanilla y Los Kumbia Kings. It was released on September 18, 2007, by EMI Televisa Music.

== Track listing ==
| No. | Title | Writer(s) | Length |
|---|---|---|---|
| 1. | "Na Na Na (Dulce Niña)" | A.B. Quintanilla III, Cruz Martínez, Luigi Giraldo | 3:39 |
| 2. | "Fuego" | A.B. Quintanilla III, Cruz Martínez, Luigi Giraldo, Jerry Bloodrock, Selite Evans, Richard Fowler, Charles Pettiford, Gregory Wigfall | 3:26 |
| 3. | "Sabes a Chocolate" | Carlos Villa De La Torre, Alejandro Monroy Fernández | 3:56 |
| 4. | "Pachuco" | Tiki, Aldo Rubén Acuna Yance, Eulalio Cervantes Galarza, Enrique Montes Arellano, Adrián Navarro Maycotte, Rolando Javier Ortega Cuenca, José Luis Paredes Pacho | 3:43 |
| 5. | "Mi Gente" | A.B. Quintanilla III, Asdru Sierra, Jiro Yamaguchi, Raúl Pacheco, Justin Poree, Luigi Giraldo, Nir Seroussi | 4:47 |
| 6. | "No Tengo Dinero" | Juan Gabriel | 4:04 |
| 7. | "Shhh!" | A.B. Quintanilla III, Cruz Martínez, Luigi Giraldo | 3:51 |
| 8. | "La Cucaracha" | A.B. Quintanilla III, Cruz Martínez, Jason "DJ Kane" Cano, Nick "DJ Franz" Washington | 3:42 |
| 9. | "Te Quiero a Ti" | A.B. Quintanilla III, Ricky Vela | 3:31 |
| 10. | "Azúcar" | A.B. Quintanilla III, Luigi Giraldo, Edward Palmieri | 3:44 |
| 11. | "Boom Boom" | A.B. Quintanilla III, Cruz Martínez, Luigi Giraldo | 4:39 |
| 12. | "Baila Esta Kumbia" | A.B. Quintanilla III, Pete Astudillo | 4:27 |
