= Kumbia Kings Live =

Live album by A.B. Quintanilla y Los Kumbia Kings
- Released: April 4, 2006
- Recorded: April 30, 2005
- Venue: Arena Monterrey; Monterrey, Nuevo León, Mexico
- Genre: Cumbia
- Length: 1:10:17
- Label: EMI Latin
- Producer: A.B. Quintanilla III; Cruz Martínez

A.B. Quintanilla y Los Kumbia Kings chronology
Duetos (2005)	Kumbia Kings Live (2006)	Greatest Hits (2007)

Singles from Kumbia Kings Live
- 1. "Pachuco" Released: March 1, 2006

Professional ratings
Review scores
Source	Rating
AllMusic	2.5/5 stars

Kumbia Kings Live is a live album and tenth album by Mexican-American cumbia group A.B. Quintanilla y Los Kumbia Kings and the first live album by Mexican-American musician A.B. Quintanilla. It was released on April 4, 2006, by EMI Latin. The concert took place on April 30, 2005, at the Arena Monterrey in Monterrey, Nuevo León, Mexico. The song "Pachuco" is a studio recording that was released as a single to promote the album.

The concert was released on video in DVD format in conjunction with the album.

== Track listing ==
CD
No.	Title	Writer(s)	Length
1.	"Intro - Time to Shine"		0:50
2.	"Baila Esta Kumbia"	A.B. Quintanilla III, Pete Astudillo	3:51
3.	"Boom Boom"	Quintanilla III, Cruz Martínez, Luigi Giraldo	3:23
4.	"Te Quiero a Ti"	Quintanilla III, Ricky Vela	4:15
5.	"Desde Que No Estás Aquí"	Quintanilla III, Giraldo	6:08
6.	"Insomnio"	Quintanilla III, Giraldo, Chris Pérez	5:41
7.	"No Tengo Dinero"	Juan Gabriel	5:31
8.	"Sabes a Chocolate"	Carlos Villa De La Torre, Alejandro Monroy Fernández	3:41
9.	"Na Na Na (Dulce Niña)"	Quintanilla III, Martínez, Giraldo	4:05
10.	"Mi Gente"	Quintanilla III, Asdru Sierra, Jiro Yamaguchi, Raúl Pacheco, Justin Poree, Giraldo, Nir Seroussi	5:34
11.	"Fuiste Mala"	Quintanilla III, Martínez, Vela	4:07
12.	"Azúcar"	Quintanilla III, Giraldo, Edward Palmieri	6:44
13.	"Reggae Kumbia"	Quintanilla III, Vico C	3:30
14.	"Fuego"	Quintanilla III, Martínez, Giraldo, Jerry Bloodrock, Selite Evans, Richard Fowler, Charles Pettiford, Gregory Wigfall	3:55
15.	"Shhh!"	Quintanilla III, Martínez, Giraldo	5:18
16.	"Pachuco"	Lobito, Sax, Aldo, Pacho, Roco, Tiki	3:45
Total length:			1:10:17

Notes

- "Baila Esta Kumbia" features prerecorded vocals by Selena Quintanilla.
- "Mi Gente" contains a snippet of "Fuiste Mala".
- "Azúcar" contains audio of the "Dance Off" towards the end.
- "Pachuco" is a studio recording and the only non-live track on the album.

== DVD ==
Kumbia Kings Live

Video by A.B. Quintanilla y Los Kumbia Kings
- Released: April 4, 2006
- Recorded: April 30, 2005
- Venue: Arena Monterrey; Monterrey, Nuevo León, Mexico
- Genre: Cumbia
- Length: 1:34:57 (Side A); 1:12:18 (Side B)
- Label: EMI Latin

A.B. Quintanilla y Los Kumbia Kings chronology
Fuego: Premium Edition (2005)	Kumbia Kings Live (2006)	Greatest Hits (2007)

=== Track listing ===
DVD Side A
No.	Title	Writer(s)	Length
1.	"Opening Message" (Spoken Message by A.B. Quintanilla)		2:25
2.	"Intro" ("Baila Esta Kumbia" Video Opening)		1:10
3.	"Baila Esta Kumbia"	A.B. Quintanilla III, Pete Astudillo	3:10
4.	"Army Chant/Nino's Hair" (Interview)		3:19
5.	"Boom Boom"	Quintanilla III, Cruz Martínez, Luigi Giraldo	3:23
6.	"Te Quiero a Ti"	Quintanilla III, Ricky Vela	4:06
7.	"Desde Que No Estás Aquí" (Intro)	Quintanilla III, Giraldo	1:05
8.	"Pangie and Pollo" (Interview)		1:39
9.	"Desde Que No Estás Aquí"	Quintanilla III, Giraldo	4:57
10.	"The Power of Kings" (Interview)		1:42
11.	"Insomnio"	Quintanilla III, Giraldo, Chris Pérez	5:39
12.	"Mr. Green Eyes" (Interview)		3:04
13.	"No Tengo Dinero"	Juan Gabriel	5:31
14.	"You Thought You Knew P-Dub" (Interview)		6:27
15.	"Sabes a Chocolate"	Carlos Villa De La Torre, Alejandro Monroy Fernández	3:40
16.	"I'm Tired of This Song" (Interview)		2:40
17.	"Na Na Na (Dulce Niña)"	Quintanilla III, Martínez, Giraldo	4:04
18.	"My Favorite Song" (Interview)		1:06
19.	"Mi Gente"	Quintanilla III, Asdru Sierra, Jiro Yamaguchi, Raúl Pacheco, Justin Poree, Giraldo, Nir Seroussi	3:42
20.	"Tattoos" (Interview)		7:10
21.	"Fuiste Mala"	Quintanilla III, Martínez, Vela	4:08
22.	"Azúcar"	Quintanilla III, Giraldo, Edward Palmieri	4:07
23.	"Unsung Heroes" (Interview)		1:17
24.	"Reggae Kumbia" (includes the "Dance Off")	Quintanilla III, Vico C	5:17
25.	"Nando Can Cook" (Interview)		1:11
26.	"Fuego"	Quintanilla III, Martínez, Giraldo, Jerry Bloodrock, Selite Evans, Richard Fowler, Charles Pettiford, Gregory Wigfall	3:53
27.	"Shhh!"	Quintanilla III, Martínez, Giraldo	5:15
Total length:			1:34:57

DVD Side B
No.	Title	Writer(s)	Length
1.	"Intro" ("Baila Esta Kumbia" Video Opening)		1:12
2.	"Baila Esta Kumbia"	A.B. Quintanilla III, Pete Astudillo	3:12
3.	"Boom Boom"	Quintanilla III, Cruz Martínez, Luigi Giraldo	3:25
4.	"Te Quiero a Ti"	Quintanilla III, Ricky Vela	4:07
5.	"Desde Que No Estás Aquí"	Quintanilla III, Giraldo	6:04
6.	"Insomnio"	Quintanilla III, Giraldo, Chris Pérez	5:41
7.	"No Tengo Dinero"	Juan Gabriel	5:30
8.	"Sabes a Chocolate"	Carlos Villa De La Torre, Alejandro Monroy Fernández	3:42
9.	"Na Na Na (Dulce Niña)"	Quintanilla III, Martínez, Giraldo	4:05
10.	"Band Members" (A.B. Quintanilla thanks the crowd and introduces each member of Kumbia Kings)		7:15
11.	"Mi Gente"	Quintanilla III, Asdru Sierra, Jiro Yamaguchi, Raúl Pacheco, Justin Poree, Giraldo, Nir Seroussi	4:31
12.	"Fuiste Mala"	Quintanilla III, Martínez, Vela	4:11
13.	"Azúcar"	Quintanilla III, Giraldo, Edward Palmieri	4:14
14.	"Dance Off" (Kumbia Kings members have a dance off)		2:50
15.	"Reggae Kumbia"	Quintanilla III, Vico C	3:10
16.	"Fuego"	Quintanilla III, Martínez, Giraldo, Jerry Bloodrock, Selite Evans, Richard Fowler, Charles Pettiford, Gregory Wigfall	3:54
17.	"Shhh!"	Quintanilla III, Martínez, Giraldo	5:15
Total length:			1:12:18

== Personnel ==
Kumbia Kings

- A.B. Quintanilla III – bass guitar, backing vocals, producer, composer
- Fernando "Nando" Domínguez III – vocals
- Frankie "Pangie" Pangelinan – vocals
- Abel Talamántez – vocals
- Irvin "Pee Wee" Salinas – vocals
- Anthony "Nino B" López – dancer, backing vocals
- Juan Jesús "JP" Peña – dancer, backing vocals
- Cruz Martínez – keyboards, producer, composer
- Chris Pérez – guitar
- Jorge "Pekas" Caballero – percussion, congas
- Ronnie "Campa" Delgado – timbales
- Robert "BoBBo" Gomez III – keyboards
- "El Animal" Noe "Gipper" Nieto Jr. – accordion, backing vocals
- Robert "Robbie" Del Moral – drums

Crew members

- David "Chocolate" Martínez – road manager
- Jorge Adame – production manager and design
- Israel "Trooper" Hinojosa – ing. lighting and production
- Victor "Cejas" Villarreal – production
- Freddie Martínez – ing. monitors
- Luis "Heman" Mendoza – ing. monitors
- Juan Villarreal – ing. audio house
- Mario Adame – ing. audio house
- Emerico "Emeraco" Alfaro – backline
- Juan "Pinky" Hernandez – backline
- Miguel "El Charro" Elizondo – backline
- Juventino "Picucho" Galvez – backline
- Abel Chronis – backline

DVD recording and production

- Teleon – DVD recording and production
- Bernardo Leon Villegas – production and direction of cameras
- Javier Garcia Espinosa – assistant of production
- Bernardette Leon Flores – assistant of direction
- Luis Ernesto Flores Macias – editing
- Mariana Felix – assistant of editing
- Dominio Digital – mobile unit
- Hugo Nuñez – coordination
- Rual "Nico" Aguilar – interview recording of A.B. Quintanilla

Audio recording

- Estudio 19 Móvil – audio recording
- Francisco "Pancho" Miranda – system design
- Carlos Montaño – system design
- Fernando Roldan – recording engineer

A&R direction

- EMI Televisa – A&R
- Manuel Calderon – A&R
- Cruz Martínez – A&R

Concert production

- Audio and lighting
  - A.B. Quintanilla III
  - Cruz Martínez
  - J. Adame Haso
  - V. Villarreal
- Recording engineers
  - Robert "BoBBo" Gomez III
  - Fernando Gomez Roldan
  - Cruz Martínez

== Charts ==
=== Weekly charts ===
Chart (2006)	Peak position
Mexican Albums Chart	9
US Billboard Top Latin Albums	18
US Billboard Latin Pop Albums	8

=== Year-end charts ===
Chart (2006)	Position
Mexican Albums Chart	68

== Sales and certifications ==
Region	Certification	Certified units/sales
Mexico (AMPROFON)	Gold	50,000^{^}
United States (RIAA)	Platinum (Latin)	100,000^{^}
^{^} Shipments figures based on certification alone.
