= Kingz One =

Kingz One (K1) aka: Kingz 1
- Origin: Corpus Christi, Texas, United States
- Genres: Cumbia, Tejano, reggae, Latin pop, hip hop,
- Years active: 2004–present, 1999-2003 with Kumbia Kings
- Members: Alex Ramirez, Roy Ramirez, Alfonso Herrera, Nino B, Tony Gonzalez, Angel Castillo, Jennifer Watts
- Past members: Andrew "Baby Drew" Maes, Issai Piñón, JB Barrientes, Marko MC, Chex Lozano, Frank Lozano
- Website: www.k1musik.com

Kingz One (K1) is a music group founded by brothers Alex and Roy Ramirez, who are originally from Chicago, Illinois and are now based in Corpus Christi, Texas. They were previously part of their uncles' group La Sombra and went on to become founding members of the Grammy-nominated Kumbia Kings. K1's music includes elements of cumbia, reggaeton, rap, hip hop, and other styles. Most of their songs are in Spanish, but they also have the English language track "My World" on their first CD, Nuestro Turno.

== Career ==
K1's debut CD Nuestro Turno was released on February 10, 2004. The release featured the single, A Que Te Pongo (I Bet I'll Make You), a song that has been covered many times. The release also took K1 to Mexico on a promotional tour. Other tracks include Por Ella, and Amor, Familia, Respect (featuring Fat Joe), in which they speak of their split from Kumbia Kings.

The group was on hiatus for some years, and the Ramirez brothers took the time to work with their cousin Cruz Martinez on his project Los Super Reyes which took them back to Mexico and led to more award nominations. Roy "Slim" Ramirez also collaborated with international recording artist Alicia Villareal on Grupo Limite's song Soy Asi.

Once Alex and Slim were ready to pick up with the K1 project again, they regrouped with a new lead singer and released their latest CD "Resurrección" on December 13, 2011. This CD is also a mix of styles, and features collaborations with friends and former Kumbia Kings, DJ Kane and Frankie J. They also collaborated with the girls of La Conquista and Don Trilo of Trilogy Mafia.

=== Critical reception ===
The first release was Nuestro Turno. K1 received a nomination for the 2005 Billboard Latin Music Award "Latin Rap/Hip-Hop Album of the Year" for this CD. The lead single, A Que Te Pongo, was nominated for song of the year at the Tejano Music Awards in 2005. Other nominations followed and media outlets such as Dallas Morning News and Laredo Morning Times praised them as being more than former Kumbia Kings, and called them the "new Kingz on the block". They appeared on such shows as "Despierta America" and "Don Francisco Presenta" to promote their new project.

Resurrección is the follow-up to their debut CD. The singles Mañana, Dame, Si Me Quieres Tu, and Baby Yea, have been in heavy radio rotation and have been included on the Tejano Magazine Top 20 and Latin Groove International Hits charts for several months. The songs have also been featured on the charts for the "Fiesta Caliente Show" and a number of other radio station and TV show charts. In support of Resurreccion, K1 have made appearances on TV shows including: Sabado Gigante, Al Rojo Vivo, Despierta America, and others.

=== Current projects ===
K1 are in the studio working on a new CD, tentatively titled "Tr3s".

== Discography ==
- Nuestro Turno (2004)
- Resurrección (2011)
