= Presents Kumbia Kings =

Compilation album / Studio album by A.B. Quintanilla y Los Kumbia Kings
- Released: April 1, 2003
- Recorded: 1999–2003
- Genre: Cumbia; R&B; pop
- Label: EMI Latin
- Producer: A.B. Quintanilla III; Cruz Martínez

A.B. Quintanilla y Los Kumbia Kings chronology
4 (2003)	Presents Kumbia Kings (2003)	La Historia (2003)

Professional ratings
Review scores
Source	Rating
AllMusic	3.5/5 stars

Presents Kumbia Kings is the first compilation album and fifth album by Mexican-American cumbia group A.B. Quintanilla y Los Kumbia Kings and the first compilation album by Mexican-American musician A.B. Quintanilla. It was released on April 1, 2003 by EMI Latin. All of the songs in the album are in English. The album includes eight previously released songs and four new songs recorded for the album.

== Track listing ==
No.	Title	Writer(s)	Length
1.	"Don't Wanna Try"	Francisco Bautista, Jaime Gálvez	4:07
2.	"Say It (A Million Times)"	A.B. Quintanilla III, Cruz Martínez, Francisco	4:08
3.	"Roll Wit Me"	Francisco, Jason Cano, Gálvez, Alex Ramírez	3:49
4.	"U Don't Love Me"	Johnnie Mae Dunson, Sean Dunson	3:52
5.	"I Need Your Love"	Quintanilla III, Francisco, Cano, Andrew Maes	3:36
6.	"Right Back"	Martínez, Luis F. Bautista	4:19
7.	"Think'n About You"	Quintanilla III, Martínez, Francisco	4:03
8.	"La Cucaracha (Ol' Skool Mix)" (featuring Organized Rhymes)	Quintanilla III, Martínez, Cano, DJ Franz	3:55
9.	"Why Did You"	Quintanilla III, Francisco	4:13
10.	"Break Me Off"	Cano, Gálvez, Reggie Valenzuela, Will	4:37
11.	"I Never Knew"	Quintanilla III, Martínez, Francisco	3:48
12.	"So Naive"	Dunson, Dunson	3:57
