= Fuego (Kumbia Kings album) =

2004 studio album by A.B. Quintanilla y Los Kumbia Kings

Studio album by A.B. Quintanilla y Los Kumbia Kings
- Released: October 5, 2004
- Recorded: 2004
- Genre: Cumbia
- Length: 52:07
- Label: EMI Latin
- Producer: A.B. Quintanilla III; Cruz Martínez

A.B. Quintanilla y Los Kumbia Kings chronology
Los Remixes 2.0 (2004)	Fuego (2004)	Duetos (2005)

Singles from Fuego
- 1. "Fuego" Released: August 23, 2004; 2. "Na Na Na (Dulce Niña)" Released: April 4, 2005; 3. "Parte de Mi Corazón" Released: June 6, 2005

Professional ratings
Review scores
Source	Rating
Allmusic	3.5/5 stars

Fuego (English: Fire) is the fourth studio album and eighth album by Mexican-American cumbia group A.B. Quintanilla y Los Kumbia Kings and the fourth studio album by Mexican-American musician A.B. Quintanilla. It was released on October 5, 2004, by EMI Latin. The premium edition was released on December 6, 2005. It has all the songs from the standard edition plus "Sabes a Chocolate", "Baila Esta Kumbia", a live version of "Na Na Na (Dulce Niña)" and a DVD that includes five music videos.

== Track listing ==
Standard edition
No.	Title	Writer(s)	Length
1.	"Intro"		0:25
2.	"Viento"	A.B. Quintanilla III, Cruz Martínez, Chris Pérez, Luigi Giraldo	3:51
3.	"Parte de Mi Corazón" (Kumbia Version) (featuring Noel Schajris)	Noel Schajris, Claudia Brant	3:52
4.	"Fuego"	Quintanilla III, Cruz, Giraldo, Jerry Bloodrock, Selite Evans, Richard Fowler, Charles Pettiford, Gregory Wigfall	3:39
5.	"Aye Amor"	Quintanilla III, Cruz, Giraldo	3:40
6.	"Perdóname"	Quintanilla III, Cruz, Robert "BoBBo" Gómez III, Giraldo	3:58
7.	"Pass the Dutchie"	George Bennett Headley, Benjamin Brown Huford, Anthony Ferguson Lloyd, Robert Bernard Lyn, Roy Jackie Mitto Donat, Leroy Anthony Sibblis, Fitzroy Ogilvie-Simpson	3:18
8.	"Quién" (featuring Belinda)	Giraldo, Gabriel Flores	3:19
9.	"Na Na Na (Dulce Niña)"	Quintanilla III, Cruz, Giraldo	3:25
10.	"If You Leave"	Sean Dunson, John Dunson	3:36
11.	"Ella Sabe"	Donald Fagen, Walter Becker	4:14
12.	"Parte de Mi Corazón" (Ballad Version) (featuring Noel Schajris)	Schajris, Brant	3:54
13.	"Bla Bla Bla"	Quintanilla III, Cruz, Freddie Martínez	4:02
14.	"Outro/Agradecimientos"		6:54

Premium edition
No.	Title	Writer(s)	Length
1.	"Intro"		0:25
2.	"Viento"	Quintanilla III, Martínez, Pérez, Giraldo	3:51
3.	"Parte de Mi Corazón" (Kumbia Version) (featuring Noel Schajris)	Schajris, Brant	3:52
4.	"Fuego"	Quintanilla III, Cruz, Giraldo, Bloodrock, Evans, Fowler, Pettiford, Wigfall	3:39
5.	"Ay Amor"	Quintanilla III, Cruz, Giraldo	3:40
6.	"Perdóname"	Quintanilla III, Cruz, Gómez III, Giraldo	3:58
7.	"Pass the Dutchie"	Headley, Huford, Lloyd, Lyn, Mitto Donat, Sibblis, Ogilvie-Simpson	3:18
8.	"Quién" (featuring Belinda)	Giraldo, Flores	3:19
9.	"Na Na Na (Dulce Niña)"	Quintanilla III, Cruz, Giraldo	3:25
10.	"If You Leave"	S. Dunson, J. Dunson	3:36
11.	"Ella Sabe"	Fagen, Becker	4:14
12.	"Parte de Mi Corazón" (Ballad Version) (featuring Noel Schajris)	Schajris, Brant	3:54
13.	"Bla Bla Bla"	Quintanilla III, Cruz, Freddie	4:02
14.	"Sabes a Chocolate"	Carlos Villa De La Torre, Alejandro Monroy Fernández	3:45
15.	"Baila Esta Kumbia" (featuring Selena)	Quintanilla III, Pete Astudillo	4:22
16.	"Na Na Na (Dulce Niña)" (Live)	Quintanilla III, Cruz, Giraldo	4:06
17.	"Outro/Agradecimientos"		6:55
Total length:			1:04:21

=== DVD ===
Fuego: Premium Edition

Video by A.B. Quintanilla y Los Kumbia Kings
- Released: December 6, 2005
- Recorded: 2004–2005
- Genre: Cumbia
- Length: 19:29
- Label: EMI Latin

A.B. Quintanilla y Los Kumbia Kings chronology
Duetos (2005)	Fuego: Premium Edition (2005)	Kumbia Kings Live (2006)

Fuego: Premium Edition DVD
No.	Title	Writer(s)	Length
1.	"Fuego"	A.B. Quintanilla III, Cruz Martínez, Luigi Giraldo, Jerry Bloodrock, Selite Evans, Richard Fowler, Charles Pettiford, Gregory Wigfall	3:28
2.	"Na Na Na (Dulce Niña)"	Quintanilla III, Martínez, Giraldo	3:39
3.	"Baila Esta Kumbia" (featuring Selena)	Quintanilla III, Pete Astudillo	4:31
4.	"Sabes a Chocolate"	Carlos Villa De La Torre, Alejandro Monroy Fernández	3:57
5.	"Parte de Mi Corazón" (Kumbia Version) (featuring Noel Schajris of Sin Bandera)	Noel Schajris, Claudia Brant	3:54
Total length:			19:29

== Personnel ==
Kumbia Kings

- A.B. Quintanilla III – bass guitar, backing vocals, producer, composer, musical arrangements, A&R
- Fernando "Nando" Domínguez III – vocals
- Frankie "Pangie" Pangelinan – vocals
- Abel Talamántez – vocals
- Irvin "Pee Wee" Salinas – vocals
- Anthony "Nino B" López – dancer, backing vocals
- Juan Jesús "JP" Peña – dancer, backing vocals
- Cruz Martínez – keyboards, backing vocals, producer, composer, musical arrangements, A&R, programming
- Chris Pérez – guitar
- Jorge "Pekas" Caballero – percussion
- Ronnie "Campa" Delgado – accordion
- Robert "BoBBo" Gomez III – keyboards, additional arrangements, programming
- "El Animal" Noe "Gipper" Nieto Jr. – accordion
- Robert "Robbie" Del Moral – drums
- Luigi Giraldo – keyboards, composer

Additional musicians and personnel

- Nicolas Barry – string arrangements
- Luis Conte – percussion (track 11)
- John Dunson – composer (track 10)
- Sean Dunson – composer (track 10)
- Frank Garcia – guitar
- Javier Garza – mixing (tracks 2, 3, 4, 5, 6, 7, 8, 9, 13)
- Seth Atkins Horan – mixing (tracks 10, 11, 12)
- Freddie Martínez – composer
- Belinda Peregrín – vocals (track 8)
- Joe Reyes – guitar
- Jake Rutigliano – assistant mixing
- Noel Schajris of Sin Bandera – vocals, composer (tracks 3, 12)
- Nir Seroussi – A&R
- Don Tyler – mastering

== Charts ==
Chart (2004)	Peak position
US Billboard 200	89
US Top Latin Albums (Billboard)	2
US Latin Pop Albums (Billboard)	2

== Sales and certifications ==
Region	Certification	Certified units/sales
Mexico (AMPROFON)	2× Platinum	200,000^{^}
United States (RIAA)	4× Platinum (Latin)	400,000^{^}
^{^} Shipments figures based on certification alone.
