= A.B. Quintanilla =

American producer, songwriter and musician

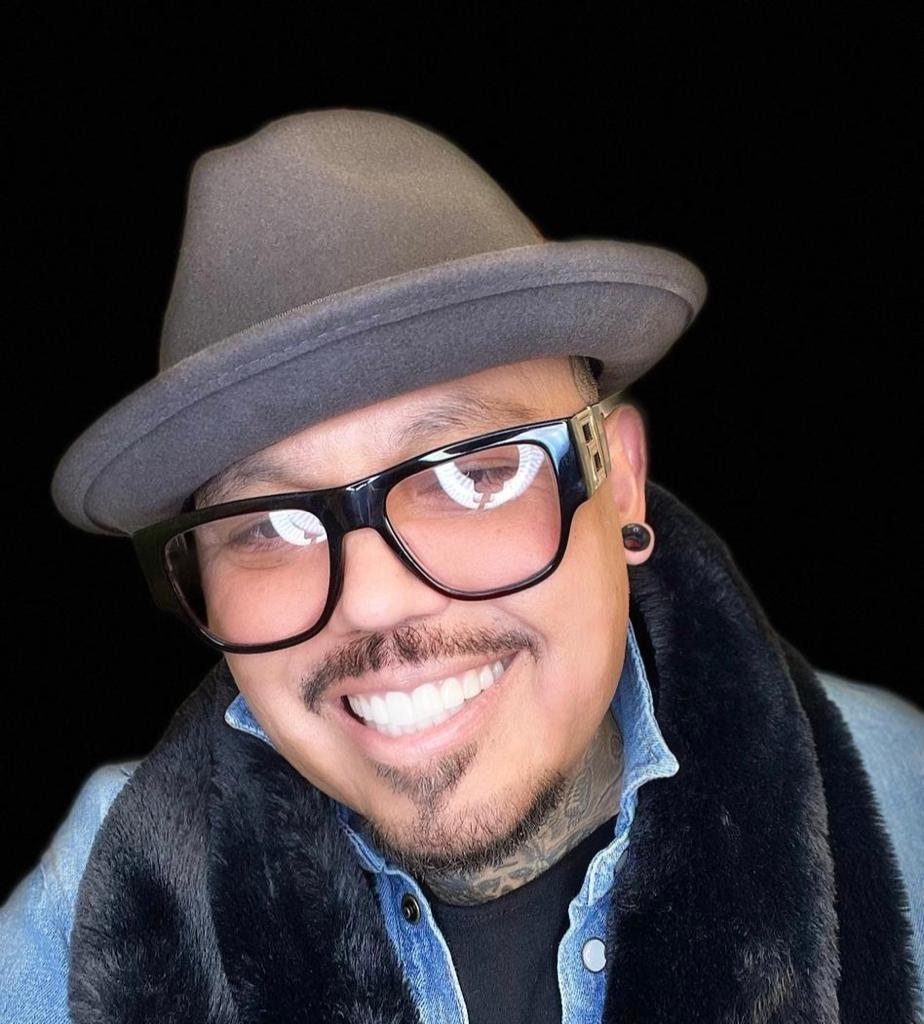
- Quintanilla in 2022
- Born: Abraham Isaac Quintanilla III; December 13, 1963 (age 62); Toppenish, Washington, U.S.
- Other names: Ibrahim L. Calderón; DJ Ibrahim; King of Kumbia; King of Cumbia
- Occupations: Record producer; songwriter; musician
- Spouses: Vangie Almeida (m. 1988; div. 2000) Heather Grein (m. 2002; div. 2004) Brenda Ramírez (m. 2004; div. 2009) Rikkie Leigh Robertson (m. 2011; div. 2017) Ángela Orellano (m. 2019)
- Partner: Summer Clary (1998–2000)
- Children: 7
- Parent(s): Abraham Quintanilla (father); Marcella Ofelia Samora (mother)
- Relatives: Suzette Quintanilla (sister); Selena (sister); Chris Pérez (brother-in-law)
- Awards: See below
- Musical career
- Origin: Lake Jackson, Texas, U.S.
- Genres: Cumbia; Tejano; Latin pop; Reggae; R&B
- Instruments: Bass guitar; guitar; backing vocals
- Years active: 1981–present
- Labels: Freddie Records (1981–1984); Cara Records (1985); GP Records (1986–1989); EMI Latin (1989–2009); Capitol Latin (2009–2012); Universal Music Latin Entertainment (2012–2016); DEL Records (2016–2024); D Luna Music (2024–present)
- Member of: Kumbia All Starz
- Formerly of: Los Dinos; Kumbia Kings
- Website: www.abquintanilla3.com

Abraham Isaac "A.B." Quintanilla III (born December 13, 1963) is an American record producer, songwriter, and musician. Dubbed the "King of Cumbia" for his influence on the cumbia music genre, he is the older brother of singer Selena. Quintanilla produced and co-wrote many of Selena's albums and singles. He is also the founder and creator of the bands Kumbia Kings and Kumbia All Starz, for which he wrote and produced numerous hit songs and performed as a member of both groups. In addition, he has written, produced, and contributed music for various other artists. (Note: King of Kumbia is also spelled as King of Cumbia. Cumbia is the correct spelling of the music genre while Kumbia is the stylization used by A.B. Quintanilla III.)

Alongside Selena, his sister Suzette Quintanilla, and his father Abraham Quintanilla Jr., he became a member of the family band Los Dinos in 1980. As part of Los Dinos, Quintanilla played bass guitar and served as a producer and songwriter, helping create successful singles such as "Como la Flor", "Amor Prohibido", and "No Me Queda Más". Following Selena's death, he went on to form Kumbia Kings and later Kumbia All Starz.

== Early life ==
Abraham Isaac Quintanilla III was born on December 13, 1963, in Toppenish, Washington. He is the oldest child of Abraham Isaac Quintanilla Jr. and Marcella Ofelia Quintanilla (née Samora); and the older brother of Suzette Quintanilla and the late Selena Quintanilla. Shortly after he was born, Quintanilla and his parents would move to Lake Jackson, Texas, where he would be raised there and where his two younger sisters were born.

== Career ==
While living in Lake Jackson, Texas, A.B. learned to play the guitar and bass. Alongside Selena, his sister Suzette, and their father, Abraham, he became a member of the successful band Los Dinos. A.B. also became Selena's producer.

He co-wrote Selena's hit songs like "Como la Flor" ("Like the Flower") and "Amor Prohibido" ("Forbidden Love").

A.B.'s sister, Selena, was murdered on March 31, 1995, which greatly devastated him. He helped produce "Como Te Extraño" ("How I Miss You") by Pedro "Pete" Astudillo, which was written for Selena as well as Astudillo's late grandmother. The song earned Astudillo a Premios Lo Nuestro award for Best Song of the Year in 1996.

A.B. Quintanilla later resurfaced in 1999 by creating the Kumbia Kings, which mixed cumbia and pop music. The Kumbia Kings went on an international tour, had several CD releases and participated on such shows as Cristina Saralegui's El Show de Cristina. Quintanilla also produced for such entertainers as Thalía, Alicia Villarreal, Verónica Castro and Cristian Castro.

He produced and arranged the 2004 album, A.B. Quintanilla III Presents Joe Lopez, which includes "Cuando Estoy Contigo" ("When I Am with You") and "Soy Tan Feliz" ("I'm So Happy"), co-written by Quintanilla and Luigi Giraldo.

A.B. Quintanilla left Kumbia Kings in mid-2006. A.B., along with new members and ex-Kumbia Kings Chris Pérez (A.B.'s brother-in-law, Selena's widower) and Pee Wee; started the group Kumbia All Starz in 2006. This new group had hits such as "Chiquilla", "Parece Que Va a Llover", and "Speedy Gonzales". The Kumbia All Starz have become immensely popular in South America, especially in Bolivia, where they performed a series of concerts in 2014.

A.B. Quintanilla signed with DEL Records and would reform and rename Kumbia All Starz to a new band called Elektro Kumbia in 2016. In 2017, they released a single called "Piña Colada Shot". The band would change the name back from Elektro Kumbia to Kumbia All Starz in late 2017.

On June 9, 2024, it was announced A.B. Quintanilla had signed with D Luna Music to be his music label and Daniel Luna will be his manager.

== In media ==
In the 1997 film Selena, written and directed by Gregory Nava, Quintanilla was played by Jacob Vargas, while Rafael Tamayo played him as a child. In the 2020 Netflix TV series Selena: The Series, Quintanilla was played by Gabriel Chavarria, while Juan Martinez played him as a child.

== Personal life ==
=== Marriages and relationships ===
A.B. Quintanilla has been married five times. Quintanilla married his first wife, Evangelina Almeida, born in February 1966 and is better known as Vangie Almeida, on April 17, 1988, in Corpus Christi, Texas, when he was 24 years old. They separated in the late 1990s. Their divorce was finalized in 2000. Quintanilla married his second wife, Heather Grein, who was born on October 14, 1984, on April 20, 2002. They divorced in September 2004. Heather Grein remains on good terms with Quintanilla and his family. Quintanilla married his third wife, Brenda Lee Ramírez, who was born on July 26, 1982, in Edinburg, Texas, on December 31, 2004, in Las Vegas, Nevada. On November 3, 2005, it was announced Quintanilla and Brenda Ramírez were getting divorced. They reconciled after she gave birth to Quintanilla's sixth child later that month and had one more child in September 2007, but would separate again. Their divorce was finalized in 2009. Brenda Ramírez now lives in Houston, Texas. Quintanilla married his fourth wife, Rikkie Leigh Robertson, who was born on March 14, 1988, on November 4, 2011, in Corpus Christi, Texas, whom he dated for two years. Rikkie Robertson appeared in the music video for "Solo", which was released on November 12, 2012. On January 5, 2013, it was announced that Quintanilla and Rikkie Robertson had separated and were divorcing after a year of marriage. They later reconciled and did not proceed with the divorce. They separated again in May 2016 and Quintanilla announced that he and Rikkie Leigh were getting divorced. The divorce was finalized in September 2017. A.B. Quintanilla and Rikkie Robertson did not have children together. A.B. Quintanilla married his fifth and current wife, Ángela Orellano, also known as Anjelah Orellano, an Argentine woman, on September 16, 2019, in Las Vegas, Nevada. A.B. Quintanilla and Ángela Orellano currently do not have children together.

A.B. Quintanilla has also been in romantic relationships with other women such as Summer Clary, born in June 1978, with whom he has a son named Gianni Quintanilla and was with her in 1998 after his separation from first wife Vangie but before their divorce was finalized, Elizabeth Olsen, an American model of Swedish descent who lived in Chicago, Illinois and appeared in his January 2008 music video "Por Ti Baby", whom he met in Puerto Rico on September 15, 2007, and were together until they broke up on September 9, 2008 (they were together after Quintanilla's separation from his third wife Brenda Ramírez in 2007 but before the divorce was finalized in 2009), and Susie De Los Santos, born on November 6, 1988, a DJ, beauty pageant model and Nuestra Belleza Latina contestant, who he dated in 2013 during his first separation from his fourth wife Rikkie, and maintains a good friendship with Quintanilla and spoke positively about him during his 2017 court case against his ex-partner Summer.

=== Children ===
A.B. Quintanilla has seven children, six sons and one daughter, born between 1989 and 2007, and had a stepdaughter during his third marriage. (Note: A.B. Quintanilla III has seven biological children. Some media outlets report on A.B. Quintanilla having six sons and two daughters. This stems from his 2008 interview with People en Español magazine where he talks about his children. During that time, A.B. Quintanilla was legally married to Brenda Ramírez who has a daughter named Madison Ramírez from a previous relationship. Madison was A.B. Quintanilla's stepdaughter during his marriage to Brenda and he included her in his list of children. In a 2017 interview during his child support court case, A.B. Quintanilla mentioned having seven children from his previous relationships.) He has a daughter, Martika Quintanilla, born on September 21, 1989, and a son, Svani Quintanilla, born on November 27, 1990, with his first wife Vangie Almeida. He has a son Gianni Mio Quintanilla, born in April 1999, with his ex-girlfriend Summer Clary. He has two sons, Abraham Isaac Quintanilla IV, born on October 14, 2002, and Elijah Jae Quintanilla, born on May 25, 2004, with his second wife Heather Grein. He has two sons, Elrey Quintanilla, born on November 15, 2005, and Justin Quintanilla, born on September 4, 2007, with his third wife Brenda Ramírez. Brenda has a daughter from a previous relationship, Madison Ramírez, born on May 20, 2001, who was A.B. Quintanilla's stepdaughter during his marriage to Brenda. His third son, Abraham Quintanilla IV, appears in the Kumbia Kings music video for their 2003 single, "Insomnio", from their 2003 album 4, and on the album cover for Kumbia All Starz 2006 album, Ayer Fue Kumbia Kings, Hoy Es Kumbia All Starz.

=== Extended family ===
A.B. Quintanilla has one granddaughter. Svani Quintanilla and Chatty Celeste Cave, Svani's girlfriend at the time, have a daughter, Yvie Quintanilla, who was born on September 20, 2017.

A.B. Quintanilla has two brothers-in-law and a nephew through his sisters. Selena Quintanilla and Chris Pérez, born on August 14, 1969, were married on April 2, 1992. Chris and Selena would remain married until Selena's death on March 31, 1995. Quintanilla's brother-in-law, Chris Pérez, would join to him in the bands created by Quintanilla, Kumbia Kings and Kumbia All Starz. Pérez would perform with Kumbia Kings on their albums and some concerts from 1998 to 2003 before joining as a full-time member in 2003 until 2006, when the Kumbia Kings disbanded. Pérez then joined Kumbia All Starz in 2006, when the band was created, and would remain until 2010. Suzette Quintanilla and Bill Arriaga were married on September 12, 1993. Bill and Suzette have a son, Jovan Arriaga, who was born on March 5, 1998, and is A.B. Quintanilla's nephew. A.B. Quintanilla has one grandnephew. Jovan Arriaga and Mallory Smith, born in 1997 and Jovan's girlfriend, have a son, Lincoln Arriaga, who was born on October 26, 2022.

== Discography ==
Albums with Selena

- Mis Primeras Grabaciones (1984)
- Alpha (1986)
- Muñequito de Trapo (1987)
- And the Winner Is... (1987)
- Preciosa (1988)
- Dulce Amor (1988)
- Selena (1989)
- Ven Conmigo (1990)
- Entre a Mi Mundo (1992)
- Selena Live! (1993)
- Amor Prohibido (1994)
- Dreaming of You (1995)

Albums with Kumbia Kings

- Amor, Familia y Respeto (1999)
- Shhh! (2001)
- All Mixed Up: Los Remixes (2002)
- 4 (2003)
- Presents Kumbia Kings (2003)
- La Historia (2003)
- Los Remixes 2.0 (2004)
- Fuego (2004)
- Duetos (2005)
- Kumbia Kings Live (2006)
- Greatest Hits (2007)
- Lo Mejor de A.B. Quintanilla III y Los Kumbia Kings (2016)

Albums with Kumbia All Starz

- Ayer Fue Kumbia Kings, Hoy Es Kumbia All Starz (2006)
- Planeta Kumbia (2008)
- La Vida de un Genio (2010)
- Blanco y Negro (2013)
- Éxitos en Vivo (2014)
- Elektro Kumbia (2017)

== Awards and nominations ==
Year	Award	Category	Work	Result
1999	Tejano Music Awards	Song of the Year	"Te Quiero, Te Amo" (performed by David Lee Garza) (written by A.B. Quintanilla III)	Won
2000	Tejano Music Awards	Album of the Year – Group	Amor, Familia y Respeto	Won
2000	Tejano Music Awards	Most Promising Band of the Year	A.B. Quintanilla III and Kumbia Kings	Won
2000	Tejano Music Awards	Showband of the Year	A.B. Quintanilla III and Kumbia Kings	Won
2000	Tejano Music Awards	Tejano Crossover	"Azúcar"	Won
2000	Billboard Latin Music Awards	Pop Album of the Year, Group	Amor, Familia y Respeto	Nominated
2000	Billboard Latin Music Awards	Pop Album of the Year, New Artist	Amor, Familia y Respeto	Won
2000	Premio Lo Nuestro	Regional Mexican Group of the Year	A.B. Quintanilla III and Kumbia Kings	Nominated
2000	Premio Lo Nuestro	Regional Mexican New Artist of the Year	A.B. Quintanilla III and Kumbia Kings	Won
2000	Latin Grammy Awards	Best Tejano Album	Amor, Familia y Respeto	Nominated
2001	Tejano Music Awards	Showband of the Year	A.B. Quintanilla III and Kumbia Kings	Won
2001	Blockbuster Entertainment Awards	Favorite Group – Latino	A.B. Quintanilla III and Kumbia Kings	Nominated
2001	Latin Grammy Awards	Best Tejano Album	Shhh!	Nominated
2002	Premio Lo Nuestro	Regional Mexican Group of the Year	A.B. Quintanilla III and Kumbia Kings	Nominated
2002	Premio Lo Nuestro	Tejano Performance	A.B. Quintanilla III and Kumbia Kings	Nominated
2002	Premio Lo Nuestro	Video of the Year	"Shhh!"	Nominated
2002	Tejano Music Awards	Album of the Year – Group	Shhh!	Won
2002	Tejano Music Awards	Crossover Song of the Year	"Shhh! (Remix)"	Won
2002	Tejano Music Awards	Showband of the Year	A.B. Quintanilla III and Kumbia Kings	Won
2002	Billboard Latin Music Awards	Pop Album of the Year, Group	Shhh!	Won
2002	Billboard Latin Music Awards	Top Latin Albums Artist of the Year	A.B. Quintanilla III and Kumbia Kings	Nominated
2003	Tejano Music Awards	Male Entertainer of the Year	A.B. Quintanilla III	Won
2003	Tejano Music Awards	Showband of the Year	A.B. Quintanilla III and Kumbia Kings	Won
2003	Latin Grammy Awards	Best Pop Album by a Duo/Group with Vocals	4	Nominated
2003	Latin Grammy Awards	Best Regional Mexican Song	"Ay! Papacito" (Límite) (with Alicia Villarreal)	Nominated
2003	American Music Awards	Favorite Latin Artist	A.B. Quintanilla III and Kumbia Kings	Nominated
2004	Premio Lo Nuestro	Regional Mexican Group of the Year	A.B. Quintanilla III and Kumbia Kings, Juan Gabriel, El Gran Silencio	Won
2004	Premio Lo Nuestro	Regional Mexican Song of the Year	"No Tengo Dinero" (with Juan Gabriel and El Gran Silencio)	Won
2004	Billboard Latin Music Awards	Latin Pop Album of the Year, Duo or Group	4	Won
2004	Premios Juventud	Dynamic Duo	Thalía with A.B. Quintanilla III and Kumbia Kings	Nominated
2004	Premios Juventud	Best Moves	A.B. Quintanilla III and Kumbia Kings	Nominated
2004	Premios Juventud	Best Re-Mix	"No Tengo Dinero" (with Juan Gabriel and El Gran Silencio)	Nominated
2004	Premios Juventud	Party Starter	"Sabes a Chocolate"	Nominated
2005	Billboard Latin Music Awards	Latin Pop Album of the Year, Duo or Group	Fuego	Won
2005	Premios Juventud	I Hear Them Everywhere	A.B. Quintanilla III and Kumbia Kings	Nominated
2005	Premios Juventud	Favorite Urban Artist	A.B. Quintanilla III and Kumbia Kings	Nominated
2005	Latin Grammy Awards	Best Regional Mexican Song	"Na Na Na (Dulce Niña)" (with Cruz Martínez and Luigi Giraldo)	Nominated
2005	Latin Grammy Awards	Best Engineered Album	Fuego (Seth Atkins, Javier Garza, Cruz Martínez and Robert "Bobbo" Gómez III)	Nominated
2006	Premio Lo Nuestro	Pop Album of the Year	Fuego	Nominated
2006	Premio Lo Nuestro	Pop Group of the Year	A.B. Quintanilla III and Kumbia Kings	Nominated
2006	Premios MTV Latinoamérica	MTV Tr3́s Viewer's Choice Award	A.B. Quintanilla III and Kumbia Kings	Nominated
2006	Latin Grammy Awards	Best Tropical Regional Mexican Album	Kumbia Kings Live	Won
2007	Billboard Latin Music Awards	Latin Pop Album of the Year, Duo or Group	Ayer Fue Kumbia Kings, Hoy Es Kumbia All Starz	Nominated
2008	Premio Lo Nuestro	Pop Album of the Year	Ayer Fue Kumbia Kings, Hoy Es Kumbia All Starz	Nominated
2008	Premio Lo Nuestro	Pop Song of the Year	"Chiquilla"	Nominated
2008	Premio Lo Nuestro	Pop Breakout Artist or Group of the Year	A.B. Quintanilla III and Kumbia All Starz	Nominated
2008	Premios Texas	Lifetime Achievement Award	A.B. Quintanilla III	Won
2008	Latin Grammy Awards	Best Pop Album by a Duo/Group with Vocals	Planeta Kumbia	Nominated
2008	Premios Oye!	Popular Field Best Tropical by a Duo/Group or Solo	Planeta Kumbia	Nominated
2009	Billboard Latin Music Awards	Latin Pop Album of the Year, Duo or Group	Planeta Kumbia	Nominated

== See also ==
- Selena
- Los Dinos
- Kumbia Kings
- Kumbia All Starz
- Honorific nicknames in popular music
- Music of Texas
- Music of Latin America
