= 4 (Kumbia Kings album) =

Studio album by A.B. Quintanilla y Los Kumbia Kings
- Released: February 25, 2003
- Recorded: 2002–2003
- Genres: Cumbia; Latin pop; R&B; hip hop
- Length: 56:18
- Label: EMI Latin
- Producers: A.B. Quintanilla; Cruz Martínez

A.B. Quintanilla y Los Kumbia Kings chronology
| All Mixed Up: Los Remixes (2002) | 4 (2003) | Presents Kumbia Kings (2003) |

Singles from 4
- 1. "No Tengo Dinero" Released: January 14, 2003; 2. "Insomnio" Released: April 3, 2003; 3. "Mi Gente" Released: July 6, 2003

Professional ratings
Review scores
| Source | Rating |
|---|---|
| Allmusic | 3.5/5 stars |

4 is the third studio album and fourth album overall by Mexican-American cumbia group A.B. Quintanilla y Los Kumbia Kings and the third studio album by Mexican-American musician A.B. Quintanilla. It was released on February 25, 2003, by EMI Latin. This album became their second number one album on the United States Billboard Top Latin Albums chart. "No Tengo Dinero" song by Juan Gabriel original version on Juan Gabriel's debut album El Alma Joven in 1971. The album received a nomination for a Latin Grammy Award for Best Pop Album by a Duo or Group with Vocals in 2003.

== Track listing ==
This track listing from Billboard.com

| No. | Title | Writer(s) | Length |
|---|---|---|---|
| 1. | "No Tengo Dinero" (featuring Juan Gabriel and El Gran Silencio) | Juan Gabriel | 4:55 |
| 2. | "Amores Como el Tuyo" | A.B. Quintanilla III, Cruz Martínez, Luigi Giraldo | 5:12 |
| 3. | "Insomnio" | Quintanilla III, Giraldo, Chris Pérez | 3:29 |
| 4. | "Llévame al Cielo" (featuring Aleks Syntek) | Quintanilla III, Martínez, Aleks Syntek | 3:58 |
| 5. | "Baby" | Quintanilla III, Jason Cano, Giraldo | 3:34 |
| 6. | "Rompecabezas" | Rodney Alejandro, Claudia Brant, Nir Seroussi | 3:38 |
| 7. | "Mi Gente" (featuring Ozomatli) | Quintanilla III, Asdru Sierra, Jiro Yamaguchi, Raúl Pacheco, Justin Poree, Giraldo, Seroussi | 4:21 |
| 8. | "Contigo" | Quintanilla III, Ricky Vela, Jesse García, Humberto García | 3:12 |
| 9. | "Don't Wanna Try" | Francisco J. Bautista, Jaime Gálvez | 4:07 |
| 10. | "Under My Skin" (featuring Organized Rhymes) | Martínez, Bautista | 3:55 |
| 11. | "Please Don't Go Girl" | Quintanilla III, Martínez, Maurice Starr, Nick Washington, Sammy García | 4:03 |
| 12. | "Count on Me" | Bautista, Gálvez | 3:31 |
| 13. | "Amores Como el Tuyo (Cumbia Version)" | Quintanilla III, Martínez, Giraldo | 3:55 |
| 14. | "No Tengo Dinero (ATM Remix)" (featuring Limi-T 21) | Gabriel | 4:28 |

== Personnel ==
Adapted from Allmusic.

Kumbia Kings

- A.B. Quintanilla III – bass guitar, backing vocals, arranger, producer, executive producer, mixing, composer
- Jason "DJ Kane" Cano – vocals, arranger
- Francisco "Frankie J" Bautista Jr. – vocals, arranger
- Andrew "Drew" Maes – vocals
- Anthony "Nino B" López – backing vocals, dancer
- Juan Jesús "JP" Peña – backing vocals, dancer
- Cruz Martínez – keyboards, arranger, programming, producer, engineer, mixing, composer
- Chris Pérez – guitar
- Alex Ramírez – keyboards
- Roy "Slim" Ramírez – percussion, backing vocals
- "El Animal" Noe "Gipper" Nieto Jr. – accordion
- Frankie Aranda – percussion
- Jesse "O'Jay" Martínez – drums

Additional musicians and production

- Rodney "Cortada" Alejandro – arranger
- Nicolas Barry – arranger, didjeridu, computers
- Robert Becker – viola
- Joel Derouin – violin
- Wil Donovan – studio assistant
- Erika Duke-Kirkpartick – cello
- Eric Flores – saxophone
- Juan Gabriel – vocals, rap (track 1)
- James Gálvez – arranger
- Humberto García – guitar
- Jesse García – guitar
- Emede González – trombone
- El Gran Silencio – vocals (track 1)
  - Tony Hernández – vocals
  - Cano Hernández – rap
  - Isaac "Campo" Valdez – accordion
  - Marcos Martínez – percussion
- Susan Jensen – violin
- Tomas Jacobi – amanuensis
- Peter Kent – violin
- Gina Kronstadt – violin
- Limi-T 21 – vocals (track 14)
- Maria Newman – viola
- Dusty "DJ Dus" Oliveira – DJ cuts and scratches
- Organized Rhymes – vocals (track 10)
- Ozomatli – vocals (track 7)
  - Asdru Sierra – vocals, trumpet
  - Raúl Pacheco – vocals, electric guitar, rhythm guitar
  - Jiro Yamaguchi – conga, cymbals, tabla, güira, cowbell
  - Justin "El Niño" Poree – cuíca, timbales, repinique
- Charles Paakkari – engineer
- Randy Stein – cello
- Aleks Syntek – vocals, keyboards (track 4)
- Jean Rosenberg – contractor
- Elvin F. Torres – producer, musical direction
- Roger Vera – trumpet
- John Wittenberg – violin

== Chart performance ==
| Chart (2003) | Peak position |
|---|---|
| US Billboard 200 | 86 |
| US Billboard Top Latin Albums | 1 |
| US Billboard Latin Pop Albums | 1 |

== Sales and certifications ==
| Region | Certification | Certified units/sales |
|---|---|---|
| United States (RIAA) | 2× Platinum (Latin) | 200,000^{^} |
^{^} Shipments figures based on certification alone.
