= No Tengo Dinero (Juan Gabriel song) =

1971 single by Juan Gabriel

Single by Juan Gabriel

from the album El Alma Joven
- Language: Spanish
- English title: "I Don't Have Money"
- Written: 1970
- Released: May 14, 1971
- Genre: Latin pop
- Length: 3:06
- Label: RCA Records
- Songwriter: Juan Gabriel

"No Tengo Dinero" (in English: "I Don't Have Money") is a song by Mexican singer-songwriter Juan Gabriel, released in 1971 on his debut studio album, El Alma Joven. The song is an original composition by Gabriel. The title track was released as a single in 1971 and is Gabriel's debut single.

The song was met with instant success and was a breakthrough for Gabriel, becoming his first hit.

== Kumbia Kings version ==
"No Tengo Dinero"

Single by A.B. Quintanilla y Los Kumbia Kings featuring Juan Gabriel and El Gran Silencio

from the album 4
- Released: January 14, 2003
- Recorded: 2002
- Genre: Cumbia music
- Length: 4:55
- Label: EMI Latin
- Songwriter: Juan Gabriel
- Producers: A.B. Quintanilla III; Cruz Martínez

A.B. Quintanilla y Los Kumbia Kings singles chronology
"La Cucaracha" (2002)	"No Tengo Dinero" (2003)	"Insomnio" (2003)

Juan Gabriel singles chronology
"Inocente Pobre Amigo" (2001)	"No Tengo Dinero" (2003)	"Inocente de Ti" (2003)

El Gran Silencio singles chronology
"No Tengo Dinero" (2003)

In 2003, Mexican-American group A.B. Quintanilla y Los Kumbia Kings covered "No Tengo Dinero" which was released as the first single from their album titled 4. Featuring Juan Gabriel and El Gran Silencio, the song was given a Lo Nuestro award for Regional Mexican Song of the Year.

=== Chart performance ===
Chart (2003)	Peak position
US Hot Latin Songs (Billboard)	5
US Regional Mexican Airplay (Billboard)	6

== Juanes version ==
In 2021, Colombian singer Juanes covered the song. It peaked the Mexican Airplay Chart.

=== Chart performance ===
Chart (2021)	Peak position
Mexican Airplay Chart	1
