= Baila Esta Cumbia =

1990 single by Selena

Single by Selena

from the album Ven Conmigo
- B-side: "La Carcacha"
- Released: August 28, 1990
- Recorded: 1989
- Studio: Zaz Studios (San Antonio, TX)
- Genre: Mexican cumbia
- Length: 2:57
- Label: EMI Latin
- Songwriters: A.B. Quintanilla; Pete Astudillo
- Producer: A.B. Quintanilla

Selena singles chronology
"Ya Ves" (1990)	"Baila Esta Cumbia" (1990)	"Buenos Amigos" (1991)

Audio sample
- "Baila Esta Cumbia": file; help

Live video
- "Baila Esta Cumbia" on YouTube

"Baila Esta Cumbia" (English: "Dance This Cumbia") is a song recorded by American Tejano singer Selena for her second studio album, Ven Conmigo (1990). It was released as the second single by EMI Latin on August 28, 1990, behind "Ya Ves". It was composed by her brother–producer A.B. Quintanilla, and Selena y Los Dinos backup dancer, Pete Astudillo. The recording is an up-tempo Mexican cumbia song. It was well received by music critics who enjoyed its cumbia-feel and rhythm.

The track received exposure on radio stations that predominately played cumbia music, and as a result the recording became a hit single for the singer. It was named among her best recordings in her career by music critics. In 2005, A.B. Quintanilla recorded a remix/duet version of the track with his band Kumbia Kings, which peaked at number 16 on the US Billboard Regional Mexican Airplay chart and number 44 on the Hot Latin Tracks chart. Other cover versions include recordings by Mexican singers Diana Reyes and Yuridia.

== Background and release ==
"Baila Esta Cumbia" was released as the second single from Ven Conmigo (1990) in the United States and in Mexico. A compilation album of the same name was released in Mexico and sold 150,000 copies. It was certified platinum by the Asociación Mexicana de Productores de Fonogramas y Videogramas (AMPROFON), denoting sales of 250,000 units. "Baila Esta Cumbia" was written by Selena's brother and principal record producer, A.B. Quintanilla and Selena y Los Dinos' backup dancer, Pete Astudillo. During an interview in 2002, A.B. said that the recording helped the band's exposure on radio stations that predominantly play cumbia music recordings.

The song is an up-tempo Mexican cumbia Tejano song. It is set in common time and moves at a moderate rate of 90 beats per minute. "Baila Esta Cumbia" is written in the key of C major. The vocal range of the melody extends from the note G♯_{3} to A_{4}.

== Reception and impact ==
The majority of contemporary reviews on "Baila Esta Cumbia" were positive. Billboard contributor Ramiro Burr praised the song for its "melodic hook". Burr, who wrote in The Billboard Guide to Tejano and Regional Mexican Music (1999), opined that Selena "evolved a rhythmic style" which paved way for "catchy cumbias", giving "Baila Esta Cumbia" as his example of her "increasing prowess". Italian essayist Gaetano Prampolini, called "Baila Esta Cumbia" a "plain cumbia dance pleasure" in his book The Shade of the Saguaro. In a 2013 contribution to OC Weekly, Marco Torres added that "Baila Esta Cumbia" is a "fun song" and noted its "lively" addictive nature. John Storm Roberts wrote in his book The Latin Tinge, that the recording is an "up-tempo romantic piece" for his review of Selena's live album, Live (1993). Roberts added that with "Como la Flor", the two "mixes pop vocalism, some quite free scatting, and a classic banda keyboard sound." Federico Martinez of the San Antonio La Prensa called the recording "upbeat".

Deborah R. Vargas wrote in her book Dissonant Divas in Chicana Music: The Limits of la Onda (2008), that Selena reconstructed Tejano music with the additions of cumbia music, giving credit to "Baila Esta Cumbia" as an example of Selena's blended musical compositions. The recording became one of Selena's biggest hit singles. It has appeared on a number of critics' "best Selena songs" lists, including OC Weekly (at number five), and Latina magazine (at number three). It entered The TouchTunes Most Played chart on Billboard on the issue dated April 7, 2001, with 1.5 million airplay spins. The song was included in the set list for the Selena Forever musical, which ran for one year in 2000.

== Charts ==
Chart (2012–14)	Peak position
US Latin Digital Songs (Billboard)	38
US Latin Pop Digital Songs (Billboard)	21
US Regional Mexican Digital Songs (Billboard)	10

== Certifications and sales ==
Region	Certification	Certified units/sales
Mexico	—	150,000
United States (RIAA)	6× Platinum (Latin)	360,000^{‡}
^{‡} Sales+streaming figures based on certification alone.

== Cover versions ==
Mexican singer Diana Reyes recorded the song for her album Ámame, Bésame (2010). Mexican singer Yuridia performed "Baila Esta Cumbia" during her tour in Mexico in 2013 to a positive reception.

=== Kumbia Kings version ===
"Baila Esta Kumbia"

Single by A.B. Quintanilla y Los Kumbia Kings featuring Selena

from the album Duetos
- Released: March 15, 2005
- Recorded: 1989 (Selena's vocals); 2005 (Kumbia Kings' vocals)
- Genre: Cumbia
- Length: 4:23
- Label: EMI Latin
- Songwriters: A.B. Quintanilla, Pete Astudillo
- Producer: A.B. Quintanilla

A.B. Quintanilla y Los Kumbia Kings singles chronology
"Fuego" (2004)	"Baila Esta Kumbia" (2005)	"Na Na Na (Dulce Niña)" (2005)

Music video
- "Baila Esta Kumbia" on YouTube

"Baila Esta Kumbia" is a song by Mexican-American cumbia group A.B. Quintanilla y Los Kumbia Kings featuring Mexican-American singer Selena. It was released on March 15, 2005 as a single from their album Duetos (2005). A.B. Quintanilla is the brother of Selena.

==== Background ====
Selena's brother and principal record producer, A.B. Quintanilla formed Kumbia Kings in 1999. In 2005, the band remixed "Baila Esta Cumbia" into a duet version for their album Duetos under the title "Baila Esta Kumbia". Evan C. Gutierrez music reviewer for AllMusic believed that the Kumbia Kings' version is a "postmortem love letter" to Selena. Kumbia Kings performed their version for the tribute concert Selena ¡VIVE!, which premiered live on Univision on April 7, 2005. The track debuted at number 35 on the US Billboard Regional Mexican Airplay chart on the issue dated April 2, 2005. It eventually peaked at number 16.

==== Personnel ====
- Written by A.B. Quintanilla and Pete Astudillo
- Produced by A.B. Quintanilla
- Lead vocals by Selena
- Intro and outro by A.B. Quintanilla
- Background vocals by A.B. Quintanilla, Fernando "Nando" Domínguez, Frank "Pangie" Pangelinan, and Abel Talamántez

==== Charts ====
Chart (2005)	Peak position
US Billboard Hot Latin Tracks	44
US Billboard Regional Mexican Airplay	16
