= Amor, Familia y Respeto =

Studio album by A.B. Quintanilla y Los Kumbia Kings
- Released: March 23, 1999
- Recorded: 1998–1999
- Genre: Cumbia, R&B, hip hop
- Length: 46:37
- Label: EMI Latin
- Producer: A.B. Quintanilla III; Cruz Martínez

A.B. Quintanilla y Los Kumbia Kings chronology
| Amor, Familia y Respeto (1999) | Shhh! (2001) |

Singles from Amor, Familia y Respeto
- 1. "Azúcar" Released: February 17, 1999; 2. "Fuiste Mala" Released: April 20, 1999; 3. "Reggae Kumbia" Released: June 6, 1999; 4. "Te Quiero a Ti" Released: August 23, 1999; 5. "Se Fue Mi Amor" Released: January 15, 2000; 6. "U Don't Love Me" Released: March 13, 2000; 7. "Dime Quién" Released: May 5, 2000

Professional ratings
Review scores
| Source | Rating |
|---|---|
| Allmusic | 3.5/5 stars |

Amor, Familia y Respeto (English: Love, Family and Respect) is the debut studio album by Mexican-American cumbia group A.B. Quintanilla y Los Kumbia Kings and the debut studio album by Mexican-American musician A.B. Quintanilla. It was released on March 23, 1999, by EMI Latin.

== Track listing ==
| No. | Title | Writer(s) | Length |
|---|---|---|---|
| 1. | "Intro" (featuring Cristina Saralegui) | | 1:00 |
| 2. | "Dime Quién" | A.B. Quintanilla III, Ricky Vela | 3:22 |
| 3. | "Cada Vez" | Quintanilla III, Luigi Giraldo | 3:49 |
| 4. | "Reggae Kumbia" (featuring Vico C) | Quintanilla III, Vico C | 3:54 |
| 5. | "Azúcar" (featuring Fito Olivares) | Quintanilla III, Giraldo, Edward Palmieri | 3:28 |
| 6. | "Se Fue Mi Amor" | Quintanilla III, Giraldo, Pete Astudillo | 3:04 |
| 7. | "Together" (featuring Roger Troutman, Nu Flavor and Babee Power) | Quintanilla III, Michael "Babee Power" Viera | 3:47 |
| 8. | "Te Quiero a Ti" | Quintanilla III, Vela | 3:14 |
| 9. | "Con el Tic Tac del Reloj" | Quintanilla III, Giraldo | 3:18 |
| 10. | "Fuiste Mala" (featuring Ricky Muñoz of Intocable) | Quintanilla III, Cruz Martínez, Vela | 3:19 |
| 11. | "Oh No" | Quintanilla III, Selena Quintanilla | 3:50 |
| 12. | "U Don't Love Me" (featuring Nu Flavor) | Sean Dunson, John Dunson (Dunson Twin Music) | 3:51 |
| 13. | "Interlude (Las Aventuras de Manolo y José)" | | 1:28 |
| 14. | "Quiero Ser Tu Dadda" (featuring Babee Power) | Quintanilla III, Giraldo, Viera | 3:50 |
| 15. | "Outro (Thanks)" | | 1:26 |

Notes

- "Oh No" was going to be the fifth recorded song by A.B. Quintanilla's sister Selena in 1995 in English under the title "Oh No (I'll Never Fall in Love Again)" for her album Dreaming of You but she sadly was killed the same day she was set to record it. In this album A.B. Quintanilla and Kumbia Kings recorded the song in Spanish. In 2015, Selena's father, Abraham Quintanilla Jr., released the song as thank you to the fans who kept writing letters asking about the English version. Though it was not recorded professionally, Selena performed the song at a rehearsal.
- "U Don't Love Me" was featured on McDonald's promotional album The Rhythm in 2000.

== Personnel ==
Kumbia Kings

- A.B. Quintanilla III – bass guitar, backing vocals, composer, producer
- Jason "DJ Kane" Cano – vocals
- Francisco "Cisko" Bautista Jr. – vocals
- Andrew "Drew" Maes – vocals
- Cruz Martínez – keyboards, composer
- Alex Ramírez – keyboards
- Roy "Slim" Ramírez – percussion, backing vocals
- Jorge Peña – percussion
- Robert "Robbie" Del Moral – drums

Additional musicians and personnel

- Pete Astudillo – composer
- Vico C – vocals (track 4)
- Sheila E. – percussion (track 4)
- Jessie García – guitar
- Luigi Giraldo – composer, engineer, mixing
- Stephanie Gómez – vocals
- Intocable – vocals (track 10)
  - Ricky Muñoz – vocals, accordion
  - Danny Sánchez – bajo sexto, backing vocals
- Nu Flavor – vocals (tracks 7, 12)
  - Frank "Pangie" Pangelinan Jr. – vocals
  - Jacob Ceniceros – vocals
  - Anthony DaCosta – vocals
  - Rico Luna – vocals
- Steve Ochoa – electric guitar
- Fito Olivares – saxophone (track 5)
- Chris Pérez – guitar
- Selena Quintanilla – composer
- Cristina Saralegui – spoken intro (track 1)
- Roger Troutman – vocals (track 7)
- Ricky Vela – composer
- Michael "Babee Power" Viera – vocals, composer (tracks 7, 14)

== Charts ==
| Chart (1999–2000) | Peak position |
|---|---|
| US Top Latin Albums (Billboard) | 6 |
| US Latin Pop Albums (Billboard) | 2 |
| US Heatseekers Albums (Billboard) | 18 |

== Sales and certifications ==
| Region | Certification | Certified units/sales |
|---|---|---|
| Mexico (AMPROFON) | Platinum | 150,000^{^} |
| United States (RIAA) | Gold | 500,000^{^} |
^{^} Shipments figures based on certification alone.
