= Cruz Martínez =

American producer, songwriter and musician (born 1972)

- Born: Cruz Martínez; June 21, 1972 (age 53); Chicago, Illinois, United States
- Other names: CK
- Occupations: Record producer; songwriter; musician
- Spouse: Alicia Villarreal (2003-2025)
- Children: 2 with Alicia Villarreal: Cruz Ángelo Martínez Villarreal (b. 2005); Félix Estefano Martínez Villarreal (b. 2007); 1 stepchild with Alicia Villarreal: Melenie Aidée Carmona Villarreal (b. 1999)
- Parent: Félix Martínez (father)
- Relatives: Daniel Martínez (brother); Antonio "Tony" Guerrero Jr. (uncle); Gavino Guerrero (uncle); Cruz Guerrero (uncle); Alex Ramírez (cousin); Roy "Slim" Ramírez (cousin)
- Awards: See below
- Musical career
- Origin: Corpus Christi, Texas, United States
- Genres: Cumbia; Tejano; Latin pop; Regional Mexican; Reggae; R&B
- Instruments: Keyboards; backing vocals
- Years active: 1989–present
- Labels: Freddie Records (1989–1990); Fonovisa (1991–1994); EMI Latin (1995–2006); Warner Music Latina (2007–present)
- Member of: Los Super Reyes
- Formerly of: La Sombra; Kumbia Kings

Cruz Martínez (born June 21, 1972) is an American record producer, songwriter and musician. He is a former member of the Tejano band La Sombra. In 1999, he joined the cumbia music group Los Kumbia Kings, created by A.B. Quintanilla. In 2007, he created the band Los Super Reyes. He was formerly married to singer Alicia Villarreal.

== Career ==
Cruz Martínez's interest in music began at the age of twelve when he learned to play the piano with the help of one of his uncles. By the age of sixteen, Martínez began producing music and programming computers in the studio for the family band. By age sixteen, Cruz had received his first Grammy nomination. He joined the Tejano band La Sombra. A.B. Quintanilla formed the band Los Kumbia Kings in 1999, which Cruz Martínez would join and co-write and co-produce songs. Los Kumbia Kings received a total of twelve Grammy nominations and have set attendance records during performances at several venues. Aside from receiving much success with Los Kumbia Kings, Cruz Martínez also gained notoriety for his keyboard talents in the industry.

In 2004, Martínez produced, arranged, and wrote Alicia Villarreal's latest album, Cuando el Corazon Se Cruza which he received two Latin Grammys for Album of the Year in 2004, several 2005 and 2006 BMI songwriting awards, two Premios Lo Nuestro Awards for Best Regional/Mexican Album and Best Regional/Mexican Song and two Billboard nominations for Album and Song of the Year. As a producer/engineer, Cruz Martínez received two more Latin Grammys in 2006 for his Kumbia Kings live album Kumbia Kings Live. Martínez's latest project is Los Super Reyes. Cruz Martínez y Los Super Reyes have already had their hit single "Muévelo" reach the top of the radio charts in the United States, Spain, Japan, Germany and in Mexico. The group has since enjoyed major chart success and maintains a busy performance schedule in support of their recent record.Recently, Cruz was asked by Television giant TV Azteca / Azteca America to participate as a Judge for the 10th anniversary of the reality show La Academia and to produce the winner's album.

== Personal life ==
Cruz Martínez married Alicia Villarreal on August 31, 2003. Cruz Martínez has two children with Alicia Villarreal. Their first son, Cruz Ángelo Martínez Villarreal, was born on December 19, 2005, and their second son, Félix Estefano Martínez Villarreal, was born on February 12, 2007. Martínez also has a stepdaughter, Melenie Aidée Carmona Villarreal, who was born on April 10, 1999 to Villarreal and Arturo Carmona during their marriage. Martínez and Arturo Carmona maintain a good relationship with each other and have worked together.

Cruz Martínez's father, Félix Martínez, died on July 14, 2020 as result of COVID-19. Félix spent 16 days battling the disease and was taken to a hospital in Brownsville, Texas where he stayed for 6 days until his death. Cruz Martínez's brother, Daniel Martínez, died on January 10, 2022.

Cruz Martínez's uncles, Antonio "Tony" Guerrero Jr, Gavino Guerrero, and Cruz Guerrero, were members of the band La Sombra, which was led by Tony Guerrero Jr. Cruz Martínez and his cousins, the brothers Alex and Roy "Slim" Ramírez, were also part of their uncles' group La Sombra, which helped start their music careers. They were also together in the bands Kumbia Kings and Los Super Reyes, being original members in both bands. Cruz Martínez and his band Los Super Reyes performed at his niece Jazzmin Martínez's quinceañera at Corpus Christi, Texas in 2009 which aired on MTV Tr3s's Quiero Mis Quinces as episode 7 of season 4 on January 11, 2010.

== Discography ==
Albums with La Sombra

- Porque Te Quiero (1991)
- Mas Que Amor (1992)
- Iluciones (1993)
- Mas Que Todo (1995)
- Caliente Dulce Amor (1996)
- Alborotados (1997)

Albums with Kumbia Kings

- Amor, Familia y Respeto (1999)
- Shhh! (2001)
- All Mixed Up: Los Remixes (2002)
- 4 (2003)
- Presents Kumbia Kings (2003)
- La Historia (2003)
- Los Remixes 2.0 (2004)
- Fuego (2004)
- Duetos (2005)
- Kumbia Kings Live (2006)

Albums with Los Super Reyes

- El Regreso de los Reyes (2007)
- Cumbia con Soul (2009)

== Awards and nominations ==
Year	Award	Category	Work	Result
2005	Latin Grammy Awards	Best Regional Mexican Song	"Na Na Na (Dulce Niña)" (A.B. Quintanilla and Kumbia Kings) (with A.B. Quintanilla and Luigi Giraldo)	Nominated
2005	Latin Grammy Awards	Best Engineered Album	Fuego (A.B. Quintanilla and Kumbia Kings) (with Seth Atkins, Javier Garza, and Robert "Bobbo" Gómez III)	Nominated
2008	Premio Lo Nuestro	Pop Breakout Artist or Group of the Year	Cruz Martínez and Los Super Reyes	Nominated
2008	Billboard Latin Music Awards	Regional Mexican Album of the Year, New Artist	El Regreso de los Reyes	Nominated
2008	Premios Oye!	Popular Field Best New Artist	Cruz Martínez and Los Super Reyes	Nominated
2008	Premios Oye!	Popular Field Best Tropical by a Duo/Group or Solo	El Regreso de los Reyes	Nominated
2009	Premios Oye!	Popular Field Best Tropical by a Duo/Group or Solo	Cumbia con Soul	Nominated

== See also ==
- La Sombra (band)
- Kumbia Kings
- Los Super Reyes
- Music of Texas
- Music of Latin America
