= Fito Olivares =

Mexican musician (1947–2023)

- Born: April 19, 1947; Ciudad Camargo, Tamaulipas, Mexico
- Died: March 17, 2023 (aged 75); Houston, Texas, U.S.
- Other name: Fito Olivares
- Occupation: Musician

Rodolfo Olivares (April 19, 1947 – March 17, 2023), known as Fito Olivares, was a Mexican cumbia musician.

== Early life ==
Olivares was born on April 19, 1947, in Ciudad Camargo, Tamaulipas, the son of María Cristina Olivares and Mucio Olivares. He spent his childhood on a ranch of Rechinadores, Tamaulipas. In the school of this ranch, he learned to play the Saxophone that his father bought him. His father Mucio Olivares was a good saxophonist and they started practicing with the saxophone together when he was 12. He graduated from the commercial academy in 1961 and began to work, keeping accounts of some businesses. He began to play professionally in 1963, at the age of 16, in Ciudad Camargo, Tamaulipas.

== Career ==
With a local group in 1962 he was invited by Abel Martínez, Bernardo Gómez and Noé Santos to be part of the Dueto Estrella in Ciudad Miguel Alemán, Tamaulipas. In 1963, he composed his first song "Ya No Eres Mia" that would lead an LP of the Duet Estrella. In 1979, Fito became part of Tam and Tex and he wrote such songs as "La Otra Musiquera", "Mi Tamaulipeca", and "Flor de Lirio". Fito Olivares y su Grupo La Pura Sabrosura was born in 1980 in Houston, Texas, after they released their first album Mi Profesión. It was recorded under the label Gil Records.

His biggest hit, "Juana La Cubana," was nominated for Lo Nuestro Awards, and his next hit, "El Colesterol," won an ASCAP award in 1996 for best song in the regional Mexican category.

Olivares had his own recording studio, Japonica Studio, and his own publisher where he recorded his songs, Sabrosura Music.

Olivares and his group retired from touring in 2007 and had settled in Houston, Texas. His brother, drummer and lead vocalist Javier Olivares died on June 10, 2012, in Pasadena, Texas.

== Death ==
On March 17, 2023, Fito Olivares died from cancer, of which he had been diagnosed the previous year.

== Billboard Hot Latin Songs ==
- El Colesterol (#4)
- El Paso de Canguro (12)
- La Zambita (#12)
- Winnona (#12)
- Agüita de Melón (#25)
- Cupido Bandido (#30)
- La Ranita (#31)
- La Pulguera (#37)
- Juana María (#38)
- La Gallina (#45)
