= Nir Seroussi =

Israeli-American music executive

- ניר סרוסי
- Born: October 17, 1975 (age 51); Ramat Gan, Israel
- Education: Berklee College of Music
- Occupation: Record executive
- Employer: Interscope Capitol Labels Group
- Label: Interscope Capitol Labels Group
- Title: Executive Vice President
- Awards: Billboard Latin Power Players; Billboard 40 Under 40; BMI Awards; Chai Lifeline Legacy of Hope Award; Berklee Alumni Achievement Award

Nir Seroussi (Hebrew: ניר סרוסי) is a music executive, songwriter, and producer. He is currently President, Interscope Capitol Miami after serving for several years as Executive Vice President at Interscope Capitol Labels Group (formerly Interscope Geffen A&M Records). He was previously the President of Sony Music U.S. Latin.

== Early life and education ==
Born in Israel, Nir Seroussi moved to the United States to attend to Berklee College of Music in Boston in 1993 where he majored in Music Business/Management and graduated summa cum laude.

== Career ==
Seroussi began his career in music publishing in 1998 at Insignia Music (founded by K.C. Porter ). As General Manager, he headed the company's joint ventures with Universal Music Publishing Group and Famous Music. Seroussi left Insignia Music in 2000 to pursue songwriting full-time. In 2002, he joined EMI Latin as Vice President of Marketing and A&R. He worked as a songwriter, A&R, and marketing executive for Regional Mexican artists Intocable and A.B. Quintanilla III, brother of the late singer Selena.

In 2004, he was named Vice President of Marketing and A&R at Sony BMG US Latin. In 2011, he was appointed Managing Director of Sony Music U.S Latin. Three years later, he was promoted to President. Seroussi signed the following artists to Sony Music U.S. Latin: Bomba Estereo, Fonseca, Farruko, Gente De Zona, Leslie Grace, Maluma, Nicky Jam, Mau y Ricky, Gerardo Ortiz, Ozuna, Paloma Mami, Prince Royce, Wisin and Yandel. In November 2018, he signed the Jenni Rivera Estate under a joint venture between The Orchard and Sony Music Latin. Under Seroussi's direction, Sony Music U.S. Latin ended 2018 as the U.S.'s leading Latin music label, according to Nielsen Music.

In February 2019, Seroussi joined Interscope Geffen A&M Records as Executive Vice President to "sign and develop talent for the company while also working across the entire roster to strengthen artists' global reach." He signed Karol G, Iván Cornejo, Xavi, and Khea. Additionally, he forged partnerships with Natanael Cano’s Los CT label, which includes artists such as Gabito Ballesteros and Delilah, and with RB Music for Grupo Marca Registrada. Seroussi worked closely with Selena Gomez, Kali Uchis, and DJ Snake on Spanish-language projects.

In 2024 Seroussi accepted on behalf of Interscope Records Billboard's Hot Latin Songs Label of the Year award, and Billboard ranked Interscope Capitol Labels Group the #3 Latin label of the year. Also in 2024 Seroussi's new Interscope Capitol Miami division signed J Balvin, and in 2025 Seroussi was name Billboard's Latin Power Players Executive of the Year.

In 2025 he became President, Interscope Capitol Miami.

Seroussi has written for numerous Latin artists, including A.B. Quintanilla III y Los Kumbia Kings, Becky G, Christian Nodal, Conjunto Primavera, Intocable, KHEA, Luis Coronel, Melina León, Olga Tañon, OV7, Ozomatli, Pepe Aguilar, Rey Ruiz, Reik, Ricardo Montaner and Yuridia, among others.

== Recognitions ==
Nir Seroussi Recognition
Year	Publication/Award	Recognition
2005	12th Annual BMI Latin Music Awards	“Mi Gente” performed by A.B. Quintanilla III y Los Kumbia Kings ft. Ozomatli
2012	Billboard	Best Bets
2013	Billboard	40 Under 40
2014	Billboard	40 Under 40
2014	21st Annual BMI Latin Music Awards	“Prometiste” performed by Pepe Aguilar
2015	Billboard	40 Under 40; Latin Power Players List
2016	Billboard	Latin Power Players List
2017	Billboard	Latin Power Players List
2018	Billboard	Latin Power Players List
2019	Billboard	Latin Power Players List
2020	Billboard	Latin Power Players List
2021	Billboard	Latin Power Players List; Executive of the Week
2022	Billboard	Latin Power Players List
2022	Variety	Miami Movers & Shakers List
2023	Billboard	Latin Power Players List
2023	Hollywood Reporter	Most Powerful Latin Players in Film, TV and Music
2024	Billboard	Latin Power Players List
2025	Billboard	Power 100
2025	Billboard	Latin Power Players Executive of the Year

He was the 2012 recipient of the Chai Lifeline Legacy of Hope Award.
