= Shhh! (Kumbia Kings album) =

Studio album by A.B. Quintanilla y Los Kumbia Kings
- Released: February 27, 2001
- Recorded: 2000–2001
- Genre: Cumbia, Latin pop, R&B
- Length: 1:07:46
- Label: EMI Latin
- Producer: A.B. Quintanilla; Cruz Martínez

A.B. Quintanilla y Los Kumbia Kings chronology
Amor, Familia y Respeto (1999)	Shhh! (2001)	All Mixed Up: Los Remixes (2002)

Singles from Shhh!
- 1. "Boom Boom" Released: January 16, 2001; 2. "Shhh!" Released: April 13, 2001; 3. "Desde Que No Estás Aquí" Released: August 25, 2001

Professional ratings
Review scores
Source	Rating
AllMusic	4/5 stars

Shhh! is the second studio album by Mexican-American cumbia group A.B. Quintanilla y Los Kumbia Kings and the second studio album by Mexican-American musician A.B. Quintanilla. It was released on February 27, 2001 by EMI Latin. This album became their first number one album on the United States Billboard Top Latin Albums chart for six non-consecutive weeks in 2001.

== Track listing ==
No.	Title	Writer(s)	Length
1.	"Primer Acto"		1:04
2.	"Shhh!"	A.B. Quintanilla III, Cruz Martínez, Luigi Giraldo	3:50
3.	"Me Enamoré"	Quintanilla III, Martínez, Giraldo	3:21
4.	"Segundo Acto"		1:41
5.	"Boom Boom"	Quintanilla III, Martínez, Giraldo	4:14
6.	"Tercer Acto"		0:43
7.	"Te Dí"	Martínez, Francisco Bautista, Jaime Gálvaz	4:24
8.	"Cuarto Acto"		0:19
9.	"Me Estoy Muriendo"	Quintanilla III, Ricky Vela, Giraldo	3:56
10.	"Dime Porqué"	Quintanilla III, Vela	3:49
11.	"Acto Final"		1:00
12.	"Desde Que No Estás Aquí"	Quintanilla III, Giraldo	3:39
13.	"Say It (A Million Times)"	Quintanilla III, Martínez, Bautista	4:08
14.	"In da Zone"	Quintanilla III, Martínez, Bautista, Jason Cano	4:00
15.	"Think'n About You"	Quintanilla III, Martínez, Bautista	4:02
16.	"I Need Your Love"	Quintanilla III, Bautista, Cano, Andrew Maes	3:35
17.	"Why Did You"	Quintanilla III, Bautista	4:12
18.	"I Never Knew"	Quintanilla III, Martínez, Bautista	3:49
19.	"Boom Boom (Menudo Mix)"	Quintanilla III, Martínez, Giraldo	4:36
20.	"Desde Que No Estás Aquí (Butta Remix)"	Quintanilla III, Giraldo	3:50
21.	"Te Dí (Southern Fried Mix)"	Martínez, Bautista, Gálvaz	3:36

== Personnel ==
This information from AllMusic.

Kumbia Kings

- A.B. Quintanilla III – bass guitar, backing vocals, arranger, vocals, producer, executive producer, mixing, composer
- Jason "DJ Kane" Cano – vocals, rap, vocal arrangement, composer
- Francisco "Cisko" Bautista Jr. – vocals, vocal arrangement, composer
- Andrew "Drew" Maes – vocals, vocal arrangement, composer
- Cruz Martínez – keyboards, arranger, programming, producer, engineer, mixing, composer
- Alex Ramírez – keyboards
- Roy "Slim" Ramírez – percussion, backing vocals
- Frankie Aranda – percussion
- Jesse "O'Jay" Martínez – drums

Additional musicians and production

- Alberto "Tico" Acuy – percussion
- Marcel Baoman – violin
- Lenny Braus – violin
- Ellen Bridger – cello
- Kathryn Collier – violin
- Isabella des Etois – violin
- John Englund – violin
- Jamie Gálvaz – arranger, programming, mixing, composer
- Jessie García – guitar
- Luigi Giraldo – engineer, vocal arrangement, production coordination, mixing, composer
- Jamie Graf – mixing
- Sahpreem A. King – arranger, programming, producer, remixer
- James "Jim" Hardy – cello
- Leslie Harlow – viola
- Ben Henderson – bass
- Amy Jackson – violin
- Kido aka Gemini – rap
- Katharine Kunz – violin
- Christopher McKellar – viola
- James McWhorter – cello
- Warren Mueller – cello
- Carlos Murguía – vocal arrangement
- Kenny O'Brien – vocal arrangement
- Jennie Outram – viola
- Kelly Parkinson – violin
- Chris Pérez – guitar
- Joe Reyes – guitar
- Judy Rich – violin
- Lynn Riling – viola
- Jimmy Shortell – trumpet
- Lois Swint – violin
- Gwen Thornton – violin
- Ricky Vela – composer
- Vitaman – arranger, programming, producer, remixer
- Barbara Williams – violin

== Chart performance ==
Chart (2001)	Peak position
US Billboard 200	92
US Billboard Top Latin Albums	1
US Billboard Latin Pop Albums	1

== Sales and certifications ==
Region	Certification	Certified units/sales
Mexico (AMPROFON)	Gold	75,000^{^}
United States (RIAA)	Gold	500,000^{^}
^{^} Shipments figures based on certification alone.
