= El Gran Silencio =

Mexican band

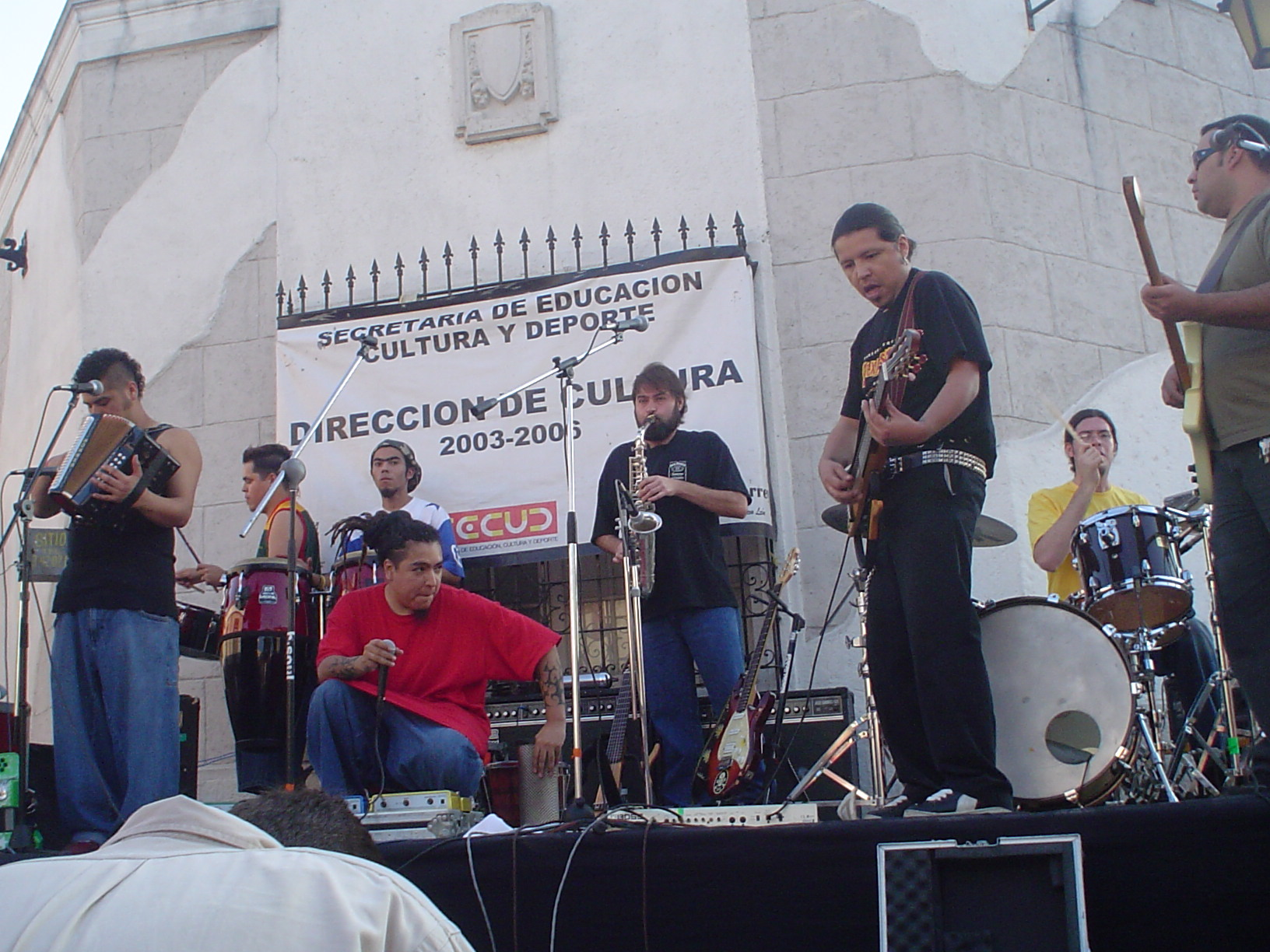
- El Gran Silencio performing at Barrio Antiguo, Monterrey in 2005

Background information
- Also known as: Zona de Silencio
- Origin: Monterrey, Nuevo León, Mexico
- Genres: Rock en español, Mexican cumbia, Latin rap
- Years active: 1993–present
- Labels: Ark 21, EMI
- Members: Tony Hernández (vocals and guitar); Ivan Monsiváis (drums); Cano Hernández (vocals and guitar) "Wiwa" Flores (bass); Palmas Martínez (percussion); Juanki Sandoval (trumpet); Fernando Alvarado (trombone); Gerardo Medellín (violin); Rey Rodríguez (keys)
- Past members: Julian "Moco" Villarreal (bass guitar); Ezequiel Alvarado(drums) and César Vulgar Hernandez

El Gran Silencio is a rock en español band from Monterrey, Mexico. It blends a variety of rock, reggae, dancehall, and hip-hop influences with traditional Latin American musical forms such as cumbia, vallenato and Norteño. Their lyrics tend to be bohemian and often talk about life in the “barrio” or poor neighborhoods of Mexican cities, especially Monterrey. As of 2015, they have recorded seven albums, eleven singles, six soundtracks, five tributes and seventeen collaborations and have toured Mexico and the United States.

== The music ==
They are unique on the Mexican music scene with their music being called world beat, cumbia grupero and rap but, their musical style crosses various genres and can combine any number including hip-hop, reggae, norteño, cumbia, rock-and-roll, polka, huapango and vallenato. Much of what keeps it together are Latin folk rhythms and the use of accordion licks. The band has called their work“freestyle norteño popular;” however, founder Tony Hernandez strongly links the music to rock as he says that rock showed that mixing genres is possible and they maintain rock’s rebellious nature.

Their work, especially their early work, has received criticism, and some dismiss it as "naco" (low class), as they celebrate subcultures such as chúntaros, barrio youths wearing baggy pants and hip-hop musical tastes. As one of few major Mexican alternative bands with authentic barrio roots, Silencio works to get that culture more accepted by mainstream Mexican society. Life in the barrio is a very common theme in the music. Tony Hernandez often talks nostalgically about life in his hometown of Monterrey, grilling carne asada on the street and playing the Beatles or La Tropa Colombiana along with family and friends. However, their lyrics are more bohemian than materialistic.

Although rap was a major element in their early work, unlike Spanish language rap artists, they perform live with real instruments. They also collaborate with other musicians on projects, to add instruments such as congas, or event to extend the band into ten pieces, with the configuration of an Afro-Caribbean orchestra with brass and percussion sections. The album Chúntaros Radio Poder creates the day in an imaginary radio station, with a number of popular Monterrey DJs of the time taking turns presenting the songs.

== History ==
El Gran Silencio emerge from the poor barrios of the northern Mexican city of Monterrey, founded by brothers Tony and Cano Hernandez in 1993. At first they called themselves La Zona del Silencio, and had only a cheap harmonica and guitar, sing pails and trash cans for the percussion, while saving money for real instruments. After finding a cassette of band of the same name, they changed it to El Gran Silencio, taken from a song by Rodrigo “Rockrigo” González, a singer/songwriter who died in the 1985 Mexico City earthquake.

Their very first recording was on a local, independent label, but their first commercial release was Libres y Locos in 1998. It immediately caused waves in the Spanish language rock community, as it combined rap-style lyrics with a ranchera attitude. The single from this album, Dormir Soñando, had some airplay on MTV en Español but did not become a hit on radio until it was covered by Los Chicos del Barrio. Their second album, Chuntaros Radio Poder,(2001) expanded the musical mix, and the rap element faded. This album began with wide mix of styles from those reminiscent of the rock of Led Zeppelin and Pink Floyd, but with heavy Latin American rhythms from norteño to cumbia and vallenato. the album produced the alternative hit, Chúntaro Style.

The band at first recorded in Mexico, but have since done so in the United States. However, their only appearance on US charts is a guest appearance with Juan Gabriel on the Kumbia Kings single No Tengo Dinero.

As of 2015, they have recorded seven albums, eleven singles, six soundtracks, five tributes and seventeen collaborations, including an album with other artists as a tribute to Los Tigres del Norte.

Over it more than twenty year history, band members have changed, with the bass player changing twice. The first bass player was Julian Villareal and the next César Vulgar Hernandez. When Julian left, he sued the band. The current line up (2015) is Tony Hernández, Isaac Valdez, Ezequiel Alvarado and "Wiwa" Flores .

== Appearances ==
Initially their ambition was to play a club in Monterrey, but since have toured both the United States and Mexico on multiple occasions, with appearances at music and cultural festivals such as the Festival Jóvenes que Muevan II in Guadalajara, Vive Latino 2015, Machaca Fest 2015 and twice at the, Festival Internacional Cervantino, Their second appearance here in 2014 was to represent their home state of Nuevo León.

== Discography ==
- Dofos (1996 Independent - Demo)
- Libres y Locos (1998 EMI - Álbum)
- Chúntaros Radio Poder (2000 EMI - Álbum)
- Super Riddim Internacional Vol.1 (2003 EMI - Álbum)
- Comunicaflow Underground (2006 EMI - Album)
- Vi - Vo (2008 Independent - Live Album)
- Revolusound vs Systema (2010 Independent - Album)
