= Evolución (Menudo album) =

Studio album by Menudo
- Released: August 25, 1984
- Genre: Latin pop
- Length: 35:43
- Label: RCA

Menudo chronology
Mania (1984)	Evolución (1984)	Menudo (1985)

Evolución (Evolution) is the sixteenth studio album (fourteenth in Spanish) by the Puerto Rican boy band Menudo, released in 1984. It marked the debut of Ricky Martin, who replaced Ricky Meléndez, the last member of the first lineup, as he was approaching 17 years old.

Martin was not the first choice to join the group. Raúl Reyes, Ray's brother who worked as a backup singer, was considered for Menudo, as was Tico Santana, another name suggested at the time. However, for unknown reasons, Ricky Martin was ultimately selected. This was also the last album recorded by Ray Reyes as a member of the group.

The album was nominated for the Grammy Award for Best Latin Pop Album in 1985. Commercially, it was a success, with an initial run of 700,000 copies in Brazil and a diamond certification after selling one million copies in the country.

== New member ==
After gaining modest fame in Puerto Rico for his work in television commercials, Ricky Martin auditioned to join the Puerto Rican boy band Menudo. Although the executives liked his singing and dancing in his first two auditions, Martin was initially rejected because he was too small. On his third audition, his persistence impressed the executives, and in 1984, at the age of 12, he became a member of the group.

A month after joining Menudo, he made his debut performance with the group at the Luis A. Ferré Performing Arts Center in San Juan. During this performance, he inadvertently disobeyed choreography by walking around the stage when he was supposed to remain still. As a result, he was reprimanded by the band's manager after the show. According to Martin, "The mistake was so significant that from that moment on, I never changed my position when I wasn’t supposed to… That was Menudo’s discipline: you did things the way you were told, or you were no longer part of the group".

== Singles ==
The song "Sabes a Chocolate" reached number 1 on the list of the most-played songs on Spanish-language radio stations in Chicago, according to Billboard magazine.

== Tour in Brazil ==
Taking advantage of the group's success in Brazil, the Menudo brand was launched, promoted by the advertising company Via Brasil in partnership with Padosa American Inc. The brand aimed to market over 200 products, including school supplies and promotional gifts. The marketing strategy included a contract for 12 shows in major cities and the possibility of advertising deals, provided the "clean" image of Menudo was respected. The tour began on February 26, 1985, in Belém do Pará.

The concert at Arruda Stadium in Recife brought together around 60,000 people on March 1, 1985. Tickets, initially sold for Cr$8,000 for the stands, reached Cr$9,000 through scalpers. The event's structure included differentiated areas such as seated sections, open-floor areas, and stands. More than 200 soldiers and six vehicles were deployed at Guararapes Airport but failed to prevent disturbances caused by fans who broke gates, forcing the group to use the military airport exit. The concert was criticized for the use of lip sync.

In Santos, 25,000 fans welcomed the quintet at Vila Belmiro Stadium at 8:45 PM after a four-hour delay caused by bad weather that affected the entire state, forcing the group to travel by bus to Sorocaba and later to Santo André before reaching the concert venue. Despite logistical problems, such as a shortened concert in Sorocaba (40 minutes) and the absence of sound and lighting technicians, the production managed to maintain the quality of the show, which was considered a success with 25,000 attendees.

The SBT broadcast special daily bulletins about Menudo's activities in Brazil, aired at 2:45 PM, 7:45 PM, and 10:15 PM. Additionally, live concert snippets were featured on TV shows like Clube do Bolinha (Band) and Programa Barros de Alencar (Record).

== Critical reception ==
Professional ratings
Review scores
Source	Rating
AllMusic	1/5 stars

The critic from Correio Braziliense described the musical production as highly polished but lacking authenticity, comparing the songs to pasteurized products designed to appeal to a broad audience without offering innovation. According to him, despite the talented musicians, the album lacked originality, resulting in a childish and predictable sound.

== Awards ==
The album was nominated for the Grammy Award for Best Latin Pop Album in 1985, competing in the same category with María Conchita Alonso (María Conchita), José Feliciano (Como Tú Quieres), José José (Secretos), Johnny (Invítame), and the winner Plácido Domingo (Siempre en Mi Corazón — Always in My Heart).

== Commercial performance ==
In 1985, Billboard magazine published two differing figures regarding sales ordered by Brazilian stores: first reporting 700,000 copies (on March 13) and later 500,000 copies (on March 23), creating uncertainty about the most reliable figure. According to the Jornal dos Sports on March 28, 1985, after their final performance in São Paulo, the group received a diamond disc for one million copies sold in the country from the hands of the vice president of the Latin-American Division of RCA International.

== Track listing ==
No.	Title	Lead Vocalist	Length
1.	"Sabes a Chocolate"	Robby Rosa	4:31
2.	"Yo No Fui"	Ray Reyes	3:31
3.	"Yo Seré Tu Bailarín"	Charlie Massó	2:59
4.	"Parque Del Oeste"	Robby Rosa	3:51
5.	"Amor Primero"	Charlie Massó	3:22
6.	"Agua De Limón"	Charlie Massó	4:12
7.	"No Hay Reflexión"	Roy Rosselló	2:59
8.	"Persecución"	Ray Reyes	3:10
9.	"Rayo De Luna"	Ricky Martin	3:42
10.	"Me Gusta Esa Chica"	Robby Rosa	3:44

== Charts ==
=== Weekly charts ===
Music Chart (1985)	Peak position
Brazil (Bizz - Top 10 Best-Sellers)	1
Brazil (Nopem)	1
United States (Billboard Top Latin Albums - California)	10
United States (Billboard Top Latin Albums - Florida)	14
United States (Billboard Top Latin Albums - Texas)	14
Puerto Rico (Billboard Top Latin Albums)	6

=== Year-end charts ===
Music Chart (1985)	Position
Brazil (Nopem)	10

== Certifications and sales ==
Region	Certification	Sales
Brazil	Diamond	1,000,000
