= Kumbia All Starz discography =

- Studio albums: 5
- Live albums: 1
- Singles: 13
- Video albums: 1
- Music videos: 13

The discography of Mexican-American cumbia group Los Kumbia All Starz consists of five studio albums, one live album, one video album, thirteen singles and thirteen music videos.

== Albums ==
=== Studio albums ===
List of studio albums, with selected chart positions, sales figures and certifications
Title	Album details	Peak chart positions				Sales	Certifications
Title	Album details	US	US Latin	US Latin Pop	US Regional Mexican	Sales	Certifications
Ayer Fue Kumbia Kings, Hoy Es Kumbia All Starz	Released: October 3, 2006; Label: EMI Latin; Format: CD, digital download	68	2	1	—	US: 200,000	AMPROFON: Gold
Planeta Kumbia	Released: March 4, 2008; Label: EMI Latin; Format: CD, digital download	148	4	2	—		
La Vida de un Genio	Released: July 27, 2010; Label: EMI Latin, Capitol Latin; Format: CD, digital download	—	9	—	3		
Blanco y Negro	Released: September 17, 2013; Label: Universal Music Latin, Siente Music; Format: CD, digital download	—	18	4	—		
Elektro Kumbia	Released: June 30, 2017; Label: DEL; Format: CD, digital download	—	—	—	—		
"—" denotes releases that did not chart or were not released in that territory.

=== Live albums ===
List of live albums, with selected chart positions
Title	Album details	Peak chart positions			
Title	Album details	US	US Latin	US Latin Pop	US Regional Mexican
Éxitos en Vivo	Released: June 20, 2014; Label: Q-Productions; Format: CD, digital download	—	—	—	—
"—" denotes releases that did not chart or were not released in that territory.

=== Video albums ===
Title	Album details
Éxitos en Vivo	Released: June 20, 2014; Label: Q-Productions; Formats: Digital download, DVD

== Singles ==
Title	Year	Peak chart positions					Album
Title	Year	US Latin	US Latin Pop	US Latin Rhythm	US Regional Mexican	US Tropical	Album
"Chiquilla"	2006	7	26	31	9	31	Ayer Fue Kumbia Kings, Hoy Es Kumbia All Starz
"Parece Que Va a Llover"	2007	—	—	—	33	—	Ayer Fue Kumbia Kings, Hoy Es Kumbia All Starz
"Speedy Gonzales"	2007	—	—	—	—	—	Ayer Fue Kumbia Kings, Hoy Es Kumbia All Starz
"Mami–Anoche No Dormí"	2007	—	—	—	—	—	Ayer Fue Kumbia Kings, Hoy Es Kumbia All Starz
"Por Ti Baby" (featuring Flex)	2008	23	—	6	—	—	Planeta Kumbia
"Rica y Apretadita" (featuring Melissa Jiménez)	2008	50	—	17	34	—	Planeta Kumbia
"Hipnótika" (featuring Voltio and Marciano Cantero from Los Enanitos Verdes)	2010	—	—	27	—	—	La Vida de un Genio
"Mentirosa" (featuring T López and Yeyo from The D.E.Y.)	2010	—	—	—	—	—	La Vida de un Genio
"Solo"	2012	—	—	—	—	—	Blanco y Negro
"Blanco y Negro"	2013	—	—	—	—	—	Blanco y Negro
"Piña Colada Shot"	2017	—	—	—	—	—	Elektro Kumbia
"La Aventura" (featuring Saga y Sonyc)	2017	—	—	—	—	—	Elektro Kumbia
"Pasito Tun Tun" (featuring Claudio Yarto)	2017	—	—	—	—	—	Elektro Kumbia
"—" denotes a recording that did not chart or was not released in that territory.

=== Promotional singles ===
Title	Year	Peak chart positions					Album
Title	Year	US Latin	US Latin Pop	US Latin Rhythm	US Regional Mexican	US Tropical	Album
"Mamacita Dónde Está Santa Claus"	2006	—	—	—	—	—	Ayer Fue Kumbia Kings, Hoy Es Kumbia All Starz (Fan Edition)
"—" denotes a recording that did not chart or was not released in that territory.

== Music videos ==
Title	Year	Album	Other performer(s) credited	Director(s)	Description	Ref(s)
"Chiquilla"	2006	Ayer Fue Kumbia Kings, Hoy Es Kumbia All Starz	None	Unknown	A.B. Quintanilla & Kumbia All Starz perform the song. Pee Wee portrays a poor worker who is in love with a rich girl.	
"Parece Que Va a Llover"	2007	Ayer Fue Kumbia Kings, Hoy Es Kumbia All Starz	None	Unknown	A.B. Quintanilla & Kumbia All Starz perform the song with policewomen. Some members also perform the song while riding a motorcycle.	
"Speedy Gonzales"	2007	Ayer Fue Kumbia Kings, Hoy Es Kumbia All Starz	None	Unknown	Animated intro with Speedy Gonzales. Spoken intro by A.B. Quintanilla. A.B. Quintanilla & Kumbia All Starz perform the song at a party. An animated version of Speedy Gonzales is used with the live action video.	
"Mami–Anoche No Dormí"	2007	Ayer Fue Kumbia Kings, Hoy Es Kumbia All Starz	None	Unknown	A.B. Quintanilla & Kumbia All Starz perform the songs at a beach.	
"Mamacita Dónde Está Santa Claus"	2007	Ayer Fue Kumbia Kings, Hoy Es Kumbia All Starz (Fan Edition)	None	Unknown	Kumbia All Starz perform the song at a Christmas party. A.B. Quintanilla does not appear in the video.	
"Por Ti Baby"	2008	Planeta Kumbia	Flex	Unknown	A.B. Quintanilla & Kumbia All Starz perform the song with Flex in a club. Also featured is A.B. Quintanilla's girlfriend at the time, Elizabeth Olsen (not to be confused with the actress of the same name), an American woman who he met in Puerto Rico and speaks Spanish. Video begins with the intro for Planeta Kumbia. Recorded in Argentina.	
"Rica y Apretadita"	2008	Planeta Kumbia	Melissa Jiménez	Unknown	A.B. Quintanilla & Kumbia All Starz perform the song with Melissa Jiménez. Also included are three female dancers and one male dancer. Recorded in Argentina.	
"Hipnótika"	2010	La Vida de un Genio	Voltio; Marciano Cantero from Los Enanitos Verdes	Unknown	A.B. Quintanilla & Kumbia All Starz perform the song with Voltio and Marciano Cantero. This is the first video by A.B. Quintanilla to feature lead singer DJ Kane since the video for "Mi Gente" in 2003.	
"Solo"	2012	Blanco y Negro	None	Suzette Quintanilla	A.B. Quintanilla & Kumbia All Starz perform the song. Features A.B. Quintanilla's then-wife, Rikkie Leigh Robertson, as a DJ.	
"Blanco y Negro"	2013	Blanco y Negro	None	Mark Muñoz	A.B. Quintanilla & Kumbia All Starz perform the song separately in a different room. A model is shown throughout the video. Black-and-white video.	
"Blanco y Negro" (Director's Cut)	2013	Blanco y Negro	None	Mark Muñoz	A.B. Quintanilla & Kumbia All Starz perform the song separately in a different room. A member of the band is added to the video who was removed from the original video due to him leaving the band. A second model is also shown throughout the video. Unused footage is added to the video. Black-and-white video.	
"Piña Colada Shot"	2017	Elektro Kumbia	None	Unknown	A.B. Quintanilla & Kumbia All Starz (as Elektro Kumbia) perform the song on a boat and beach.	
"La Aventura"	2017	Elektro Kumbia	Saga y Sonyc	Unknown	A.B. Quintanilla & Kumbia All Starz (as Elektro Kumbia) perform the song with Saga y Sonyc.	
"Pasito Tun Tun"	2017	Elektro Kumbia	Claudio Yarto	Unknown	A.B. Quintanilla & Kumbia All Starz (as Elektro Kumbia) perform the song in a club with Claudio Yarto.	
