= Aimé Painé =

Argentine singer (1943–1987)

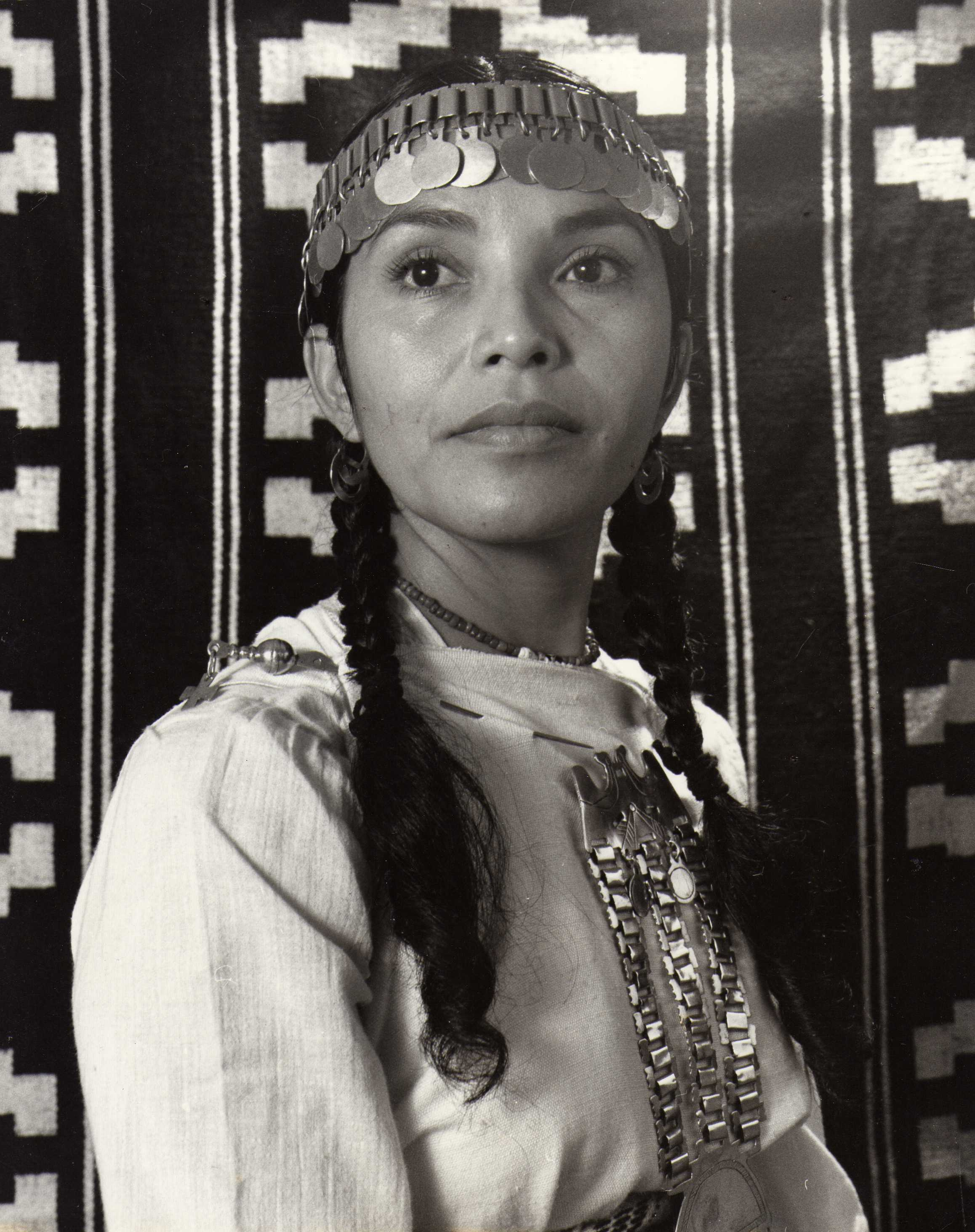
- Born: Olga Elisa Painé; August 23, 1943; Ingeniero Luis A. Huergo, Argentina
- Died: September 10, 1987 (aged 44); Asunción, Paraguay
- Occupation: Singer

Aimé Painé (August 23, 1943 — September 10, 1987), born Olga Elisa Painé, was an Argentine singer of Mapuche and Tehuelche origin who dedicated herself to the rescue and diffusion of the folk music of her people.

== Life ==
Aimé Painé was born in 1943, at Ingeniero Luis A Huergo, in the province of Río Negro. According to some, she was the granddaughter of a Tehuelche cacique, lonco Painé Ngürü, although there is no evidence to prove it. She was legally given the forenames Olga Elisa on her birth registration due to the impossibility of registering her with a Mapuche name owing to Argentine law of that time, although she later adopted her native name, Aimé (Mapundungun for "reddish evening"), for her artistic work.

According to Cristina Rafanelli, a biographer of Aimé Painé, Painé's mother, the daughter of Tehuelches, abandoned her Mapuche husband, Segundo Painé and all of their children. Aimé, at the age of 3, was separated from her community because her father, needing to work, could not take care of so many children. She was sent to an orphanage - nun school, the Unzué Institute of Mar del Plata, far away from her land and culture. She excelled in the Gregorian chant choir, eagerly waiting for the Holy Week and Corpus Christi festivities, because it was the time to interpret the Gregorian chants which the nuns taught her.

Paine was adopted by lawyer and playwright Héctor Llan de Rosos and his wife. There, she studied music with private teachers: guitar with Roberto Lara, and singing with Blanca Peralta and Nina Kabanciwa. Painé moved to Buenos Aires, working as a hairdresser, weaver and assistant to the painter Roberto Ramaugé.

In 1973, she joined the Coro Nacional Polifónico (National Polyphonic Choir). During an international meeting of choirs in Mar del Plata, she felt dismayed; each country had prepared at least one piece of indigenous or folkloric music, except for the Argentine choir. This event led her in a journey back to her hometown and heritage, where Aimé met her biological father and brothers and learned more of her origins. Learning about the Taiel, a Mapuche tune that one of the many village grandmothers (machis), grandmother Domitila, interpreted in Mapudungun, she said it reminded the Gregorian chant she learned in the orphanage, a stripped down song, as free and natural as it was religious; it was singing of life.

She then decided to present her Mapuche culture to the world, performing in traditional Mapuche wear and playing traditional instruments such as the trompe, the cultrun, the cascahuillas, and mentioning the use of the trutruca and the kull kull. Painé travelled to England and Switzerland, presenting the Mapuche music and culture, and denouncing the marginalization of indigenous peoples in Argentina.

She died in Asunción, Paraguay, aged 44, after suffering a brain aneurysm during a recording. Her body was buried in her hometown, alongside that of her father, who died soon after she did.

== Homages ==
There are libraries, schools, complexes, choirs and streets in the province of Río Negro named after her, as well as a street of Puerto Madero in Buenos Aires.

A picture of her is also part of the Women's Hall in the Casa Rosada, the official residence of the President of Argentina.

In 2021, a four-episode biographical series about her was filmed in Patagonia, produced, directed, and scripted by filmmaker Aymará Rovera. Aimé Painé was played by Charo Bogarín.

On 23 August 2021, Google honored Painé with a doodle on what would be her 78th birthday.
