= Blanco y Negro =

Blanco y Negro ("Black and White" in Spanish) can refer to

- Blanco y Negro (magazine) in Spain
- Blanco y Negro Music, a record label in Spain
- Blanco y Negro Records, a record label in the United Kingdom
- Blanco y Negro (album), an album by A.B. Quintanilla and Kumbia All Starz
  - "Blanco y Negro" (song), a song by A.B. Quintanilla and Kumbia All Starz
