= Emanuel Cecchini =

Argentine footballer

Personal information
- Full name: Rodrigo Emanuel Cecchini
- Date of birth: 24 December 1996 (age 29)
- Place of birth: Ingeniero Huergo, Argentina
- Height: 1.79 m (5 ft 10 1/2 in)
- Position: Midfielder

Team information
- Current team: Juventud
- Number: 19

Youth career
- CSyD Huergo
- 2010–2015: Banfield

Senior career*
Years	Team	Apps	(Gls)
2013–2017	Banfield	30	(4)
2017–2020	Málaga	2	(0)
2018	→ León (loan)	1	(0)
2018–2019	→ Banfield (loan)	15	(0)
2019	→ Seattle Sounders FC (loan)	4	(0)
2020	→ Unión Santa Fe (loan)	5	(0)
2021–2023	Gimnasia LP	38	(0)
2023–2024	Unión Española	17	(0)
2024–2025	Audax Italiano	26	(1)
2025–2026	San Lorenzo	20	(1)
2026–	Juventud	3	(0)
- * Club domestic league appearances and goals as of 23:34, 14 March 2026 (UTC)

Rodrigo Emanuel Cecchini (born 24 December 1996) is an Argentine footballer who plays as a midfielder for Uruguayan Primera División club Juventud.

== Club career ==
=== Banfield ===
Born in Ingeniero Luis A. Huergo, Río Negro Province, Cecchini joined Banfield's youth setup in 2010, from CSyD Huergo. On 14 June 2013, he made his first team debut at the age of 16, coming on as a late substitute in a 4–2 away win against Defensa y Justicia in the Primera B Nacional.

Cecchini subsequently returned to the youth setup, only appearing once on the bench during the 2013–14 season as his side achieved promotion to the Primera División. He made his debut in the category on 21 February 2015, replacing Nicolás Bertolo in a 4–1 defeat of Atlético de Rafaela.

Cecchini became a regular starter under Julio César Falcioni during the 2016–17 campaign, and scored his first goal on 2 October 2016 by netting the winner in a 3–2 home success over San Martín de San Juan.

=== Málaga ===
On 27 July 2017, Cecchini signed a five-year deal with La Liga club Málaga CF. He made his debut on 15 October, replacing Paul Baysse late into a 0–2 home loss against CD Leganés.

On 28 December 2017, Cecchini was loaned to Mexican Club León for the next six months without a buying option. After appearing in only 63 minutes for the club, he returned to Banfield the following 25 June, also in a temporary deal.

On 8 August 2019, Cecchini was loaned to Seattle Sounders FC of Major League Soccer (MLS) on the last day of the league's summer transfer window. After again appearing rarely, he joined Unión de Santa Fe also in a temporary deal.

Cecchini was one of the eight first-team players released by Málaga on 3 October 2020, due to a layoff; his loan, however, was maintained until its expiration (January 2021), with the player being officially released afterwards.

=== Gimnasia La Plata ===
On 18 February 2021, Cecchini joined Gimnasia LP, signing a deal until the end of 2021. On 7 January 2022, Cecchini signed a new contract with the club until the end of the year.

=== In Chile ===
In 2023, Cecchini played for Chilean Primera División club Unión Española. The next season, he switched to Audax Italiano.

== Honours ==
Banfield

- Primera B Nacional: 2013–14

Seattle Sounders FC

- MLS Cup: 2019
