= Éxitos en Vivo (A.B. Quintanilla album) =

Live album by A.B. Quintanilla y Los Kumbia All Starz
- Released: June 20, 2014
- Recorded: 2014
- Genre: Cumbia
- Length: 53:33
- Label: Q-Productions
- Producer: A.B. Quintanilla

A.B. Quintanilla y Los Kumbia All Starz chronology
Blanco y Negro (2013)	Éxitos en Vivo (2014)	Elektro Kumbia (2017)

Éxitos en Vivo (English: Hits Live) is a live album by Mexican-American cumbia group A.B. Quintanilla y Los Kumbia All Starz and the second live album by Mexican-American musician A.B. Quintanilla. It was released on June 20, 2014 by Q-Productions.

== Track listing ==
No.	Title	Writer(s)	Length
1.	"Mami"	A.B. Quintanilla III, Luigi Giraldo, Eliseo Diosdado, Ricardo Ruiz Pérez	4:34
2.	"Hipnótika"	Quintanilla III, Giraldo, Marciano Cantero, Julio Ramos	4:00
3.	"Azúcar"	Quintanilla III, Giraldo, Edward Palmieri	5:33
4.	"Insomnio"	Quintanilla III, Giraldo, Chris Pérez	3:38
5.	"Boom Boom"	Quintanilla III, Cruz Martinez, Giraldo	4:32
6.	"Invisible"	Quintanilla III, Giraldo, Luis Enrique	4:43
7.	"Si Una Vez"	Quintanilla III, Pete Astudillo	5:30
8.	"Parece Que Va a Llover"	Antonio Matas	3:12
9.	"No Tengo Dinero"	Juan Gabriel	6:15
10.	"Fuiste Mala"	Quintanilla III, Martínez, Ricky Vela	7:29
11.	"I'll Be There"	Berry Gordy, Bob West, Willie Hutch, Hal Davis	4:07

== Personnel ==
Kumbia All Starz

- A.B. Quintanilla III – bass guitar, backing vocals, composer, producer
- J.R. Gomez – vocals
- Ramón Vargas – vocals
- Nick Banda – keyboards
- Chris "ChrisBot" Domínguez – keyboards
- Saúl Cisneros, Jr. – drums
- Lissenne "Liz" Juárez – congas
- Eloy Vásquez – güira
