= List of former Cash Money Records artists =

This is a list of artists who were formerly signed to Cash Money Records.

Act	Years on label	# Albums released under Cash Money
All Star Cashville Prince	2007	–
Ace Hood	2012–2015	1
Austin Mahone	2012–2015	2
Aziatix	2014	–
Blueface	2018–2024	1
Boo & Gotti	2005	1
Boo	2006–2012	–
Bow Wow	2009–2015	–
Brisco	2006–2009	–
Busta Rhymes	2011–2014	1
Caskey	2012–2020	1
Chris Richardson	2010–2015	–
Christina Milian	2016	–
Currensy	2004–2007	–
Chanel West Coast	2012–2015	–
Dunk Ryders	2008–2010	–
DJ Khaled	2010–2015	3
Drake	2009–2019	6
Glasses Malone	2007-2015	1
Hot Boys	1997–2001	3
Jae Millz	2016	3
Jay Sean	2015	2
Keke Wyatt	2004–2006	–
Kevin Rudolf	2007–2015	2
Kidd Kidd	2005	2
Lil' Mo	2004-2006	–
Limp Bizkit	2014	–
Lil Wayne	1997–2018	10
Mack 10	2000-2003	1
Magnolia Shorty	1997	1
Mavado	2012–2015	–
Money Man	2016–2018	–
Mystikal	2011–2015	–
Nicki Minaj	2010–2018	5
Papa Reu	2000	–
Paris Hilton	2013–2016	–
PJ Morton	2015	1
Porcelain Black	2009–2013	–
Teena Marie	2006	2
TQ	2004	–
Tyga	2016	3
Tony Lopez	2015	–
U.N.L.V.	1997	5
Vado	2014–2015	–
Young Buck	1996	–
Young Greatness (deceased)	2018	–
