= Nací para Sufrir =

2010 song by A.B. Quintanilla

"Nací Para Sufrir"

Song by A.B. Quintanilla y Los Kumbia All Starz featuring José Feliciano and Los Dinos

from the album La Vida de un Genio
- Released: July 27, 2010
- Recorded: 2010
- Genre: Cumbia
- Length: 4:02
- Label: EMI Latin, Capitol Latin
- Songwriters: A.B. Quintanilla, Luigi Giraldo
- Producers: A.B. Quintanilla, Abraham Quintanilla, Jr., Suzette Quintanilla, Luigi Giraldo

"Nací Para Sufrir" is a song by A.B. Quintanilla y Los Kumbia All Starz. The song appeared on the album La Vida de un Genio, released on July 27, 2010. It features José Feliciano and Los Dinos.

== Background ==
"Nací Para Sufrir" is one of the most notable album tracks on the album La Vida de un Genio because it includes Selena's band Los Dinos which was the first time in 15 years since the death of Selena that Los Dinos recorded a song together. It was written by A.B. Quintanilla III and Lugi Giraldo and produced by A.B. Quintanilla, Abraham Quintanilla, Jr., Suzette Quintanilla and Luigi Giraldo. The lead vocalists on the song are José Feliciano and Pete Astudillo.

== Personnel ==
- Written by A.B. Quintanilla III and Luigi Giraldo
- Produced by A.B. Quintanilla III, Abraham Quintanilla Jr., Suzette Quintanilla and Luigi Giraldo
- Recorded by Luigi Giraldo, Brian Moore, Robert Gómez III and Rafael Rodríguez
- Lead vocals by José Feliciano and Pete Astudillo
