= Solo (A. B. Quintanilla song) =

Single by A. B. Quintanilla y Los Kumbia All Starz

from the album Blanco y Negro
- Released: October 30, 2012
- Recorded: 2012
- Genre: Cumbia
- Length: 3:42
- Label: EMI Latin, Capitol Latin
- Songwriters: A.B. Quintanilla; Luigi Giraldo
- Producers: A.B. Quintanilla; Luigi Giraldo

A.B. Quintanilla y Los Kumbia All Starz singles chronology
"Mentirosa" (2010)	"Solo" (2012)	"Blanco y Negro" (2013)

"Solo" is a song by Mexican-American cumbia group A. B. Quintanilla y Los Kumbia All Starz. It was released on October 30, 2012, as the first single from Quintanilla's eighth studio album Blanco y Negro (2013).

== Music video ==
The music video was directed by A. B. Quintanilla's sister Suzette Quintanilla and was shot at Corpus Christi, Texas. It was released on November 19, 2012. The video shows A. B. Quintanilla and the Kumbia All Starz and Quintanilla's wife Rikkie Leigh Robertson as a DJ performing at a club.

== Track listing ==
- Digital download
1. "Solo" – 3:42

== Personnel ==
- Written by A. B. Quintanilla and Luigi Giraldo
- Produced by A. B. Quintanilla and Luigi Giraldo
- Lead vocals by Angel Castillo
- Background vocals by A. B. Quintanilla
