= Éxitos En Vivo =

Éxitos En Vivo may refer to:

- Éxitos En Vivo (La Mafia album), 1995
- Éxitos en Vivo (A.B. Quintanilla album), 2014
