= Sol Picó =

Spanish dancer and choreographer (born 1967)

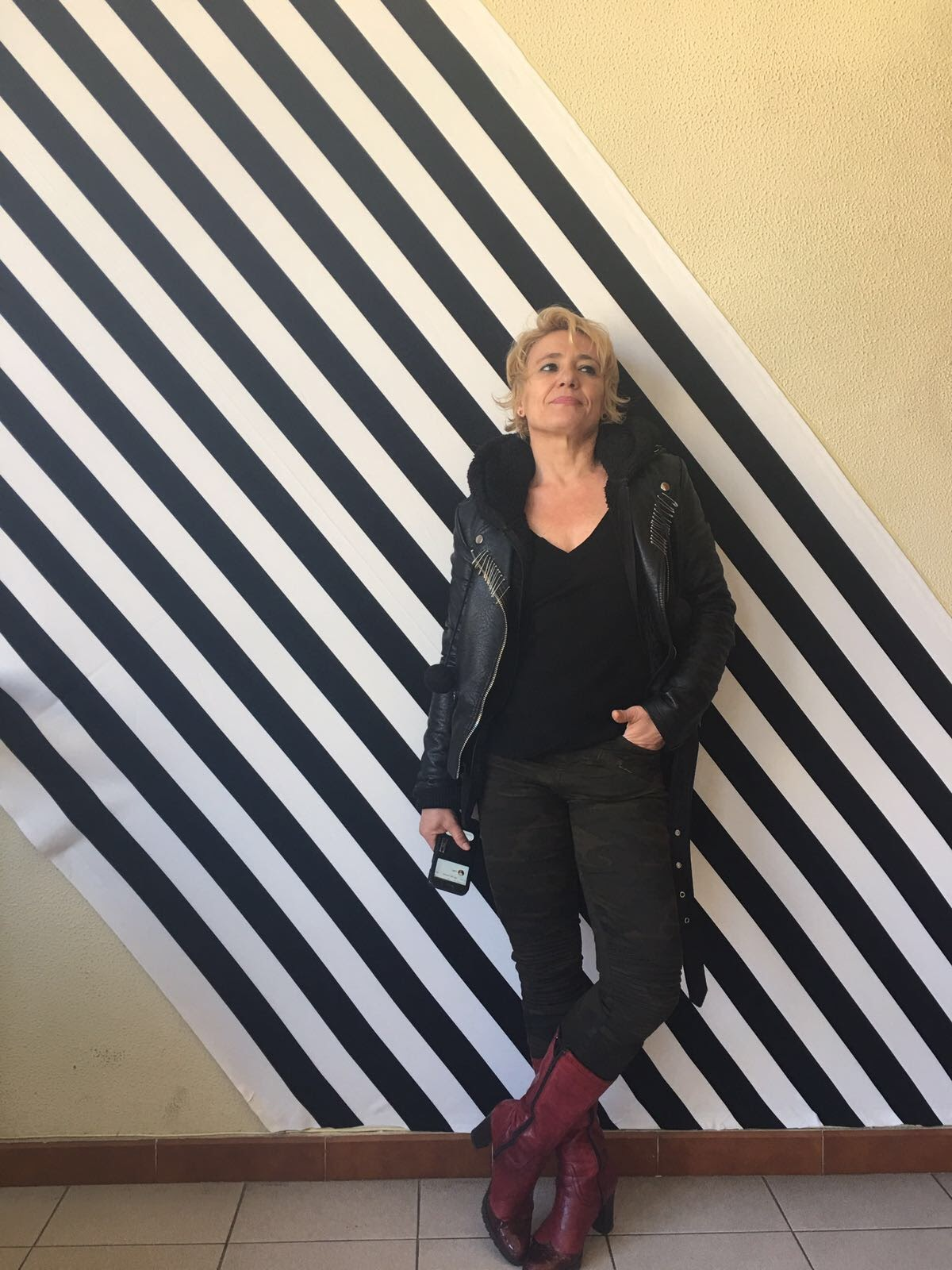
- At Sismògraf 2017
- Born: Sol Picó Monllor; 1967 (age 57–58); Alcoy, Spain
- Occupation(s): Dancer, choreographer
- Awards: Premios Max (10); National Dance Award (2016)

Sol Picó Monllor (born 1967) is a Spanish dancer and choreographer. She has studied Spanish dance, ballet, and contemporary dance, and combines different techniques and languages in her productions in a groundbreaking way. In 1993 she created the Sol Picó Company, with which she has become one of the most heterodox choreographers and dancers of the Spanish contemporary scene. She has received numerous awards, including 10 Premios Max, the National Dance Award of Catalonia (2004), the City of Barcelona Dance Award (2015) and the National Dance Award of Spain (2016).

== Biography ==
Sol Picó graduated in Spanish and Classical Dance at the Oscar Esplà Conservatory in Alicante in 1985. She completed her training at La Fábrica Espai de Dansa in Barcelona (1986–1988), La Ménagerie de Verre in Paris (1988–1989), and Movement Research in New York (1997). During her trip to Paris she studied under directors such as Cesc Gelabert, Susanne Linke, and Sara Sughiara.

== Professional career ==
She took her first steps as a professional with the Alcoy theater company La Cassola, and created her first company, Danza Robadura, in 1988. From 1990 to 2003, during the first years of her professional career, she worked as a performer and choreographer with companies and creators such as Rayo Malayo Danza, Los Rinos, and La Fura dels Baus. In 1993, she created the Sol Picó Company in Barcelona, which allowed her to develop her personal stamp and establish herself in the city.

From 2002 to 2004, the Sol Picó Company was a resident dance company at the Teatre Nacional de Catalunya.

Trained in classical dance and performing in alternative theater, she has become one of the most heterodox choreographers and dancers of the contemporary scene.

In 2003 she premiered La dona manca o Barbi-Superestar, a show that explores the female universe. Nine female performers, six dancers, and three musicians build and deconstruct the feminine world, its integrity and fragility. In her review for the newspaper La Vanguardia, Teresa Sesé wrote:

The show is presented as a "drunkenness of contrasts" that proposes "striking metaphors about the fantasy of happiness, female suffering, sexual myths or isolation." Of course, all this, she clarifies, "from a surrealist perspective and with a point of madness."

In the spring of 2009 Picó premiered El llac de les mosques (The Lake of the Flies), a piece for two dancers, four musicians, and an actor, described as:

Under the pretext of doing a revue, a look back, she has structured this show around a rock and roll concert, full of humor and cross readings. In this work she handles genre themes to the rhythm of rock, blues, flamenco, etc.

In 2012 she prepared Llàgrimes d'Àngel (Angel Tears) on the occasion of the presentation of the Romanesque Art Collection at the Museu Nacional d'Art de Catalunya. That November she inaugurated the Fringe Festival, Beijing's international avant-garde performing arts event, with El llac de les mosques.

Her next production was Memòries d'una puça (Memories of a Flea). In 2013 Picó reflected on the financial crisis and proposed a flight forward as a reaction and hope for the social situation. A very hard physical spectacle that caused a serious injury to the dancer during its premiere at the Festival Temporada Alta, it was conceived "as a sort of intimate 'red movie', asking constant questions: 'In the continuous movement, do we flee or move forward?'; 'What do we leave behind and how does it affect us?'; 'To what extent are we real participants in the construction of our future?'; 'The relations established in this nomadic journey – are they complicit, are they collaborative?'; 'Who are we and how do we choose our traveling companions?'"

In 2014 she presented One-hit wonders, a solo show in which she reviews her 20-year career, selecting the best moments of her shows Bésame el Cactus (2000), La dona manca o Barbi-Superestar (2003), Paella mixta (2004), Memòries d'una puça (2012), and DVA (2012).

In May 2014 she premiered La piel del huevo te lo da at Barcelona's Ciutat Flamenco Festival, reflecting on women through flamenco and contemporary dance. She directed and performed in the show with actress Candela Peña in her theatrical debut, the singer La Shica, and the musicians Dani Tejedor on percussion and Bernat Guardia on double bass. The work was also presented in Madrid at the Teatro del Barrio in January 2015.

In February 2015, when Picó celebrated the 20th anniversary of her company, she received the City of Barcelona Dance Award for leading her artistic career "with rigor, joy, and quality" and for teamwork and her involvement in the city and the neighborhood in collaboration with other artists.

In 2016, she received the National Dance Award in the Creation category, granted by Spain's Ministry of Education, Culture, and Sports.

== Commitment to equality ==
Picó reflects the feminine universe in many of her works, questions stereotypes, and is committed to the defense of equality. In 2012 she endorsed a letter signed by 200 women from all areas of Catalan culture addressed to the Generalitat de Catalunya's Minister of Culture, Ferran Mascarell, calling for "an effort to combat gender inequality." Also in January 2014, she endorsed a letter to the government from women intellectuals and artists requesting the withdrawal of the draft bill presented by Minister Gallardón which would reduce women's rights in regard to abortion. In the show WW We Women (2015) she presents a collective and intercultural perspective with a collaborative project with other artists to reflect on the role of women within the current social structure. In October 2015 she choreographed and performed in the premiere of Només som dones (We are Only Women) at the Teatre Nacional de Catalunya, with Míriam Iscla and Maika Makovski, directed by Carme Portaceli. It was written by Carmen Domingo about the silenced perspectives of women in the Spanish Civil War and Franco's dictatorship.

== Works ==
- 1993: Pevequi
- 1994: Peve, Espectacular Dance Poemato
- 1995: Spitbrides
- 1996: Bèstia
- 1996: Razona la vaca
- 1997: Love is fàstic
- 1997: Del planeta basura
- 1998: E.N.D. (Esto No Danza)
- 1999: D.V.A. (Dudoso Valor Artístico)
- 2000: Bésame el Cactus
- 2001: Amor diesel
- 2002: El 64
- 2003: La dona manca o Barbi-Superestar
- 2004: Paella mixta
- 2004: La diva y el hombre bala
- 2006: Lluna peluda
- 2006: La prima de Chita
- 2007–2008: Las Doñas
- 2008: Sirena a la plancha
- 2009: El llac de les mosques
- 2010: Cortando jamón
- 2010: Matar al bicho
- 2011: Petra, la mujer araña y el putón de la abeja Maya with Maru Valdivieso
- 2012: Lágrimas de Ángel
- 2012: Spanish Omelette
- 2013: Memorias de una pulga
- 2014: One-hit wonders
- 2014: La piel del huevo te lo da with Candela Peña and La Shica
- 2015: WW We Women
- 2015: Només son dones with Míriam Iscla and Maika Makovski, directed by Carme Portaceli

== Collaborations ==
- 1990–2003: No es todo metal with Francesc Bravo's Company Rayo Malayo; short film Ojos que no ven with Sigfrid Monleón; dance video No Paris with Joan Pueyo; Dadle café y XXX with La Fura dels Baus; Etrangel with La Danaus Teatro; Filo with Juan López; Cròniques with Joan Ollé; Lear with Carme Portaceli
- 1991: Actress at the 1st Conferencia en Rilolaxcia '91 with Los Rinos
- 1993: Video of the El Último de la Fila song "Como un burro amarrado en la puerta del baile"
- 1993: Actress in the short film Retrats directed by Marcel.lí Antúnez and JM Aixalá
- 2003: Actress and co-director with Octavi Masià on the short film El 64
- 2007: Artistic direction of the 2007 Premios Max gala in Bilbao, and of Viatges a la Felicitat for the Teatre Nacional de Catalunya's project "T Dansa"
- 2009: Direction of the marionette play and music for the Barcelona salon "La Puntual" with singer Mariona Sagarra and puppeteer Eugenio Navarro; recording of the short film Praeludium by Pau Durà; actress and dancer in the play El Ball directed by Sergi Belbel
- 2010: Guided tour Vist per Sol Picó of the Picasso Museum in Barcelona
- 2011: Participation in the exhibition Salvador Dalí canta at the Acoustic Festival of Figueres; participation in the inaugural season of the Theater l'Archipel of Perpignan; participation in the TV special Una historia para el nuevo año; guided tour of the MNAC with the piece Llàgrimes d'Àngel
- 2012: Choreography for the Gala Gaudí; workshops Animalaris in Madrid and Juneda InCursió, Lleida; choreography for the concert A tot Vent at L'Auditori, Barcelona; appearance in the Dácil López music video "¿Por qué no estás aquí?"
- 2015: Film Cerca de tu casa with director Eduard Cortés about evictions

== Awards and recognitions ==
=== Premios Max ===
| Year | Category | Work | Result | Ref. |
|---|---|---|---|---|
| 2002 | Best Choreography | Bésame el Cactus | Won | |
| 2002 | Best Dance Show | Bésame el Cactus | Nominated | |
| 2002 | Best Women's Dance Performance | Bésame el Cactus | Won | |
| 2003 | Best Dance Show | Bésame el Cactus | Won | |
| 2004 | Best Dance Show | La dona manca o Barbi-Superestar | Won | |
| 2004 | Best Choreography | La dona manca o Barbi-Superestar | Won | |
| 2005 | Best Choreography | Paella Mixta | Won | |
| 2009 | Best Dance Show | Sirena a la plancha | Won | |
| 2010 | Best Choreography | El Llac de les mosques | Won | |
| 2011 | Best Choreography | El ball | Won | |
| 2011 | Best Women's Dance Performance | El ball | Won | |

=== Others ===
- 2002: Butaca Award for Best Dance Show for Bésame el Cactus
- 2002: Valencia Critics' Award for Bésame el Cactus
- 2002: Distinguished with Applause by the FAD Sebastià Gasch Prizes for Bésame el Cactus
- 2003: Performing Arts Awards of the Generalitat Valenciana: Best Dance Performer, Best Choreographic Direction, Best Dance Show for Bésame el Cactus
- 2003: Public Prize of Tarragona for Best Dance Show for Bésame el Cactus
- 2003: Butaca Award for Best Dance Show for La dona manca o Barbi-Superestar
- 2004: National Dance Award of Catalonia
- 2007: Billboard Award of Turias
- 2008: La Peladilla d'Or d'Alcoy
- 2009: FAD Sebastià Gasch Prize for El Llac de les Mosques
- 2009: Prize for Best Show of the 15th edition of the International Street Theater Festival in Pula, Croatia for Sirena a la plancha
- 2009: Prize for Best Dance Production of the 23rd International Theater and Dance Fair of Huesca for El llac de les mosques
- 2012: Prize of the TVE program Continuará
- 2015: City of Barcelona Dance Award
- 2016: National Dance Award of Spain, Creation Category
