= Soluna =

American music group

- Origin: California, U.S.
- Genres: Pop, urban pop
- Years active: 1998–2004; 2016
- Label: DreamWorks Records (1998–2004)
- Past members: Aurora Rodriguez; America Olivo; Jessica Castellanos; Christina "T" López

Soluna was a music group consisting of four members, all of Hispanic descent – Aurora Rodriguez, America Olivo, Jessica Castellanos, and Christina "T" López. The group's name is the combination the Spanish words for sun ("sol") and moon ("luna"). Both Lopez and Castellanos are pursuing primarily solo music careers, and Olivo is developing an acting resume, including a recent role on General Hospital.

== Music career ==
=== 1998: Group formation ===
Soluna began in 1998 when Jessica Castellanos met Aurora Rodriguez and America through a mutual producer they were working with individually. The three began singing together, and after discovering the harmony and chemistry with their voices, they then sought a fourth member to complete the group.

Another producer named Nick Martinez recommended to them a young girl he'd met while driving in Ontario, California. He had stopped at a local auto-body shop due to car trouble and saw the owner's daughter's picture on the wall. The girl's father assured him his daughter was talented and could sing. Her name was Christina "T" Lopez, and after singing "Amazing Grace" over the phone, she became the final member of Soluna. Shortly after their line-up was complete, Soluna signed with DreamWorks Records.

=== 2001: Musical debut - For All Time ===
Soluna's debut album was finished by summer of 2001. It featured tracks with pop, rock, dance and Latin sounds due to the influence of producers Steve Morales, Tim & Bob, Josh & Brian, Thunderpuss 2000, Ozomatli and Tim Miner. The members of Soluna produced one track (the a cappella "Te Vengo A Decir") and co-wrote five others ("Bring It To Me," "I'll Be Waiting," "So In Love," "Spanish Lullaby," and "Luna Mia"). The uptempo song "Bring It To Me" was picked as the first single and rose to the Top 20 of Billboard's Dance Chart

However, following the September 11 attacks in 2001, Soluna decided to go in a different musical direction by focusing on promoting a power ballad, "For All Time," as their new single. The single was released commercially along with an a cappella arrangement of several patriotic songs ("A Patriotic Medley"). In 2002, Soluna performed at the NAACP Image Awards, as well as Elton John's 10th annual Oscar Gala. "For All Time" was formally released to radio on February 12, 2002. The debut album of the same name was released on May 14, 2002.

"For All Time" became Soluna's best-known song. The corresponding video, directed by Bille Woodruff, was shot in both English and Spanish in June 2002 and premiered on MTV's "Total Request Live" on July 24, 2002. This track made the Top 20 of Billboard's Top 40 Mainstream Chart as well as the Top 30 on the Adult Contemporary Chart. During this time, Soluna toured as the opening act for artists such as Enrique Iglesias and Marc Anthony. The quartet also traveled to Puerto Rico and Mexico to promote their music.

The third single from the For All Time album was a Latin-influenced dance track, "Monday Mi Amor." It was released to radio on November 11, 2002. During its first week on the charts, it was among the top ten most-added tracks in the CHR/POP Category for Radio. The dance remix to "Monday Mi Amor" by DJ Wildlife peaked at #3 on the Billboard Hot Dance/Club Breakout Chart, which was Soluna's highest charting.

=== 2002–2004: Additional recordings ===
During this time, Soluna had been writing and recording tracks for a second album, which was to be a Spanish language disc.

In May 2004, Soluna announced they had recorded a duet with recording artist J. Roman (a former member of the group Vi3). This track, entitled "Where Are You?" premiered on Chicago's B96 radio on May 17, 2004. Jessica was featured on the verses while all group members sang the chorus. A Spanish version ("Donde Esta?") was also recorded, as well as a pseudo cover of Eddie Money's "Take Me Home Tonight", with Castellanos singing the chorus and J.Roman performing original verses in a rap style. While "Where Are You?" achieved moderate success and radio play, J. Roman re-recorded it with a new female singer, Natalie, and this new version was released to radio. The song was released on Natalie's debut album as a bonus track, but the song received little attention.

=== 2004: Hiatus ===
The members of Soluna decided to part ways in late 2004. However, the group disbanded on amiable terms and left the option open of an eventual reunion.

Jessica Castellanos, America Olivo, and T López later pursued solo music projects.

=== 2016: Reunion ===
The group, minus Jessica, reunited for a Christmas EP in 2016.

== Further projects ==
Shortly after "Monday Mi Amor" was released, the members of Soluna announced that they were beginning to work out a sitcom deal with UPN based on their adventures in the music business. The pilot was shot in April 2004 but was not picked up. They appeared in an episode of Nickelodeon's first Latino-influenced show The Brothers Garcia in December 2002.

Olivo has appeared on House (twice as recurring role "Ingrid, the Masseuse"), Jake in Progress, Cuts and How I Met Your Mother. Olivo has also wrapped a small role in the vampire gore flick "The Thirst." She has since wrapped roles in the independent film "Love Shack" as well as a cameo role in the upcoming Iron Man. In 2006, Olivo launched her own solo website, as well as a MySpace page. Between both sites, she released several demo songs, and announced several film roles as well as a lead role in the Hollywood, CA base theatre production of "Hotel C'Est L'Amour" as "Maria", which ran at The Blank's Second Stage from September 26, 2006 to November 5, 2006. Since 2006, four demo songs have premiered: "Summer", "Porcelain Eyes", "Deja Vu" and "Water From the Moon." Olivo recently announced she will appear in two new independent films: "The Circle" and "The Resort." On January 14, 2008, it was officially announced that Olivo was cast as Marietta on ABC soap opera General Hospital, and would begin appearing on January 22, 2008. She is set to appear in the films Friday the 13th and Bitch Slap.

Lopez has appeared on TV shows Charmed, South of Nowhere, The Suite Life of Zack & Cody and CSI: Crime Scene Investigation. She also serves as a host on the SiTV show "The Drop." She has wrapped small roles in "Hollywood Kills" and "The Boys and Girls Guide to Getting Down" satirical documentary. Also in 2006, Lopez launched her own solo music MySpace page. No music had premiered, however Lopez stated she was working on both English and Spanish solo albums. In August 2007, Lopez confirmed she signed to Cash Money Records. She appeared on the cover of Nuestro Mundo Magazine's January 2007 issue.

== Awards ==
In February 2003, Soluna won an award for Best New Pop Artist at the Los Heraldos Awards in Mexico. They were also nominated for two International Dance Awards in 2002: Best New Dance Artist Group, and Best Latin Dance Track for "Monday Mi Amor.

== Discography ==
=== Albums ===
Album Information
For All Time
- Release: May 14, 2002
- Label: DreamWorks
- Peak U.S. Billboard: N/A
- U.S. sales: N/A
- RIAA certification: N/A
- Singles: Bring It To Me (club), For All Time, Monday Mi Amor

== Chart history ==
Single	Chart (2002)	Peak position
"For All Time"	U.S. Billboard Hot 100	72
"For All Time"	Top 40 Radio	19
"For All Time"	Adult Contemporary	29
"For All Time"	Hot Dance Music/Club Play	16
"Bring It To Me"	Hot Dance Music/Club Play	8
