= Cascahuilla =

South American instrument

The cascahuillas or cashcahuillas is a percussion instrument from the music of the Mapuche people of Chile and Argentina.

It is an instrument typically used in the regions of the Machupe people. It is used as accompaniment in religious ceremonies when playing the cultrun (or kultrun), which is a type of ceremonial drum. The instrument is composed of a leather strap, on which bronze jingle bells are attached. The leather strap is tied around the hand that strikes the cultrun, or in the case of dancers, it sounds as the dancers move.

A homemade version of the instrument is simple to make with leather and four jingle bells.

The machi (Machupe shaman) accompanies themself with this instrument in a healing ceremony called machitún.

The name of the instrument comes from the Mapudungun word kaskawilla (pronunciation: [kaskawiʎa], [kaʃkawiʎa]) or kadkawilla ([kaθkawiʎa], [kaðkawiʎa]), which in turn is an adaptation of the Castilian word cascabel ("jingle bell"), in its form cascabillo.
