= Piña Colada Shot =

Single by A.B. Quintanilla y Los Kumbia All Starz

from the album Elektro Kumbia
- Released: January 27, 2017
- Recorded: 2017
- Genre: Cumbia
- Length: 3:39
- Label: DEL
- Songwriters: Miguel Bosé Dominguin, Miguel Matamoros, Wilfredo Carme Martinez Mattos, Calixto Antonio Ochoa, Rosa María Girón Ávila
- Producers: A.B. Quintanilla, Luigi Giraldo

A.B. Quintanilla y Los Kumbia All Starz singles chronology
"Blanco y Negro" (2013)	"Piña Colada Shot" (2017)	"La Aventura" (2017)

"Piña Colada Shot" is a song by Mexican-American cumbia group A.B. Quintanilla y Los Kumbia All Starz. It was released on January 27, 2017, as the first single from his ninth studio album Elektro Kumbia (2017). The song is a cover medley of past songs "El Africano", "La Chula", and "Vamos Pa' la Conga".

== Track listing ==
- Digital download
1. "Piña Colada Shot" – 3:39

== Personnel ==
- Written by Miguel Bosé Dominguin, Miguel Matamoros, Wilfredo Carme Martinez Mattos, Calixto Antonio Ochoa, and Rosa María Girón Ávila
- Produced by A.B. Quintanilla and Luigi Giraldo
- Lead vocals by Alfonso Ramirez, Zuriel Ramirez, and Ramon Vargas
- Background vocals by A.B. Quintanilla
