= La Shica =

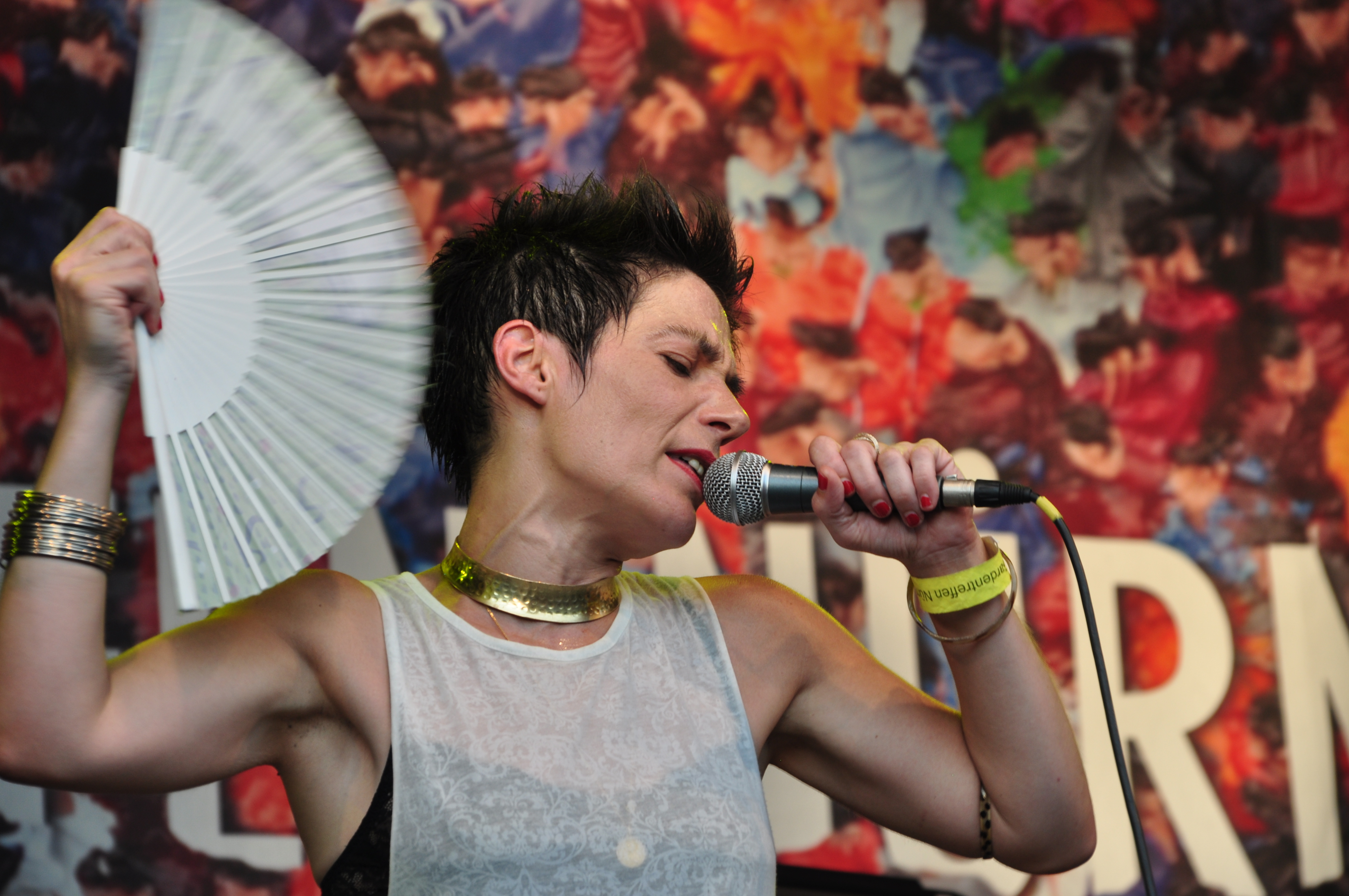
- At the 2013 Bardentreffen festival in Nuremberg
- Born: Elsa Rovayo; 12 January 1976 (age 49); Ceuta, Spain
- Occupations: Singer, dancer
- Awards: Premios de la Música (2011)
- Musical career
- Genres: Flamenco, hip hop, copla
- Labels: DRO
- Website: www.lashica.com

La Shica is the pseudonym of Elsa Rovayo (born 12 January 1976), a Spanish pop singer with flamenco, Spanish dance, and classical ballet training capable of approaching singing and dancing by drinking in the copla and mixing and fusing it with urban sounds such as hip-hop and rap. Andreu Buenafuente said of her that she was "the coplera 2.0", also saying that she is the coplera of the 21st century. She has shared the stage with artists such as Martirio, Bebe, Jorge Drexler, Pau Donés, Manuel Carrasco, and Rosendo. In 2011 she won two Premios de la Música as Artista Revelación and Autor Revelación.

== Biography ==
Elsa Rovayo was born in Ceuta. She was the youngest of three brothers, and as a child she wanted to be an artist. She passed through the dance academies of the city that soon became too limited for her. At age 15 and with two deaths behind her (that of her father whom she lost when she was 11, and her brother's) she moved to Madrid where she studied flamenco, Spanish dance, and classical ballet at the school Amor de Dios. It was formed by teachers such as Belén Maya, Rafaela Carrasco, and Merche Esmeralda. Later she also took voice classes with Lidia García.

== Professional career ==
At 17, Rovayo began to work professionally as a flamenco dancer. She toured the tablaos of Madrid, Barcelona, Seville, and Paris. She was part of the companies of Merche Esmeralda, José Antonio Galicia, Ricardo Franco, Sara Lezana, and Alfonso Losa, among others. In 2006 she collaborated with the company Arrieritos on the show Trece Rosas, the winner of several Premios Max.

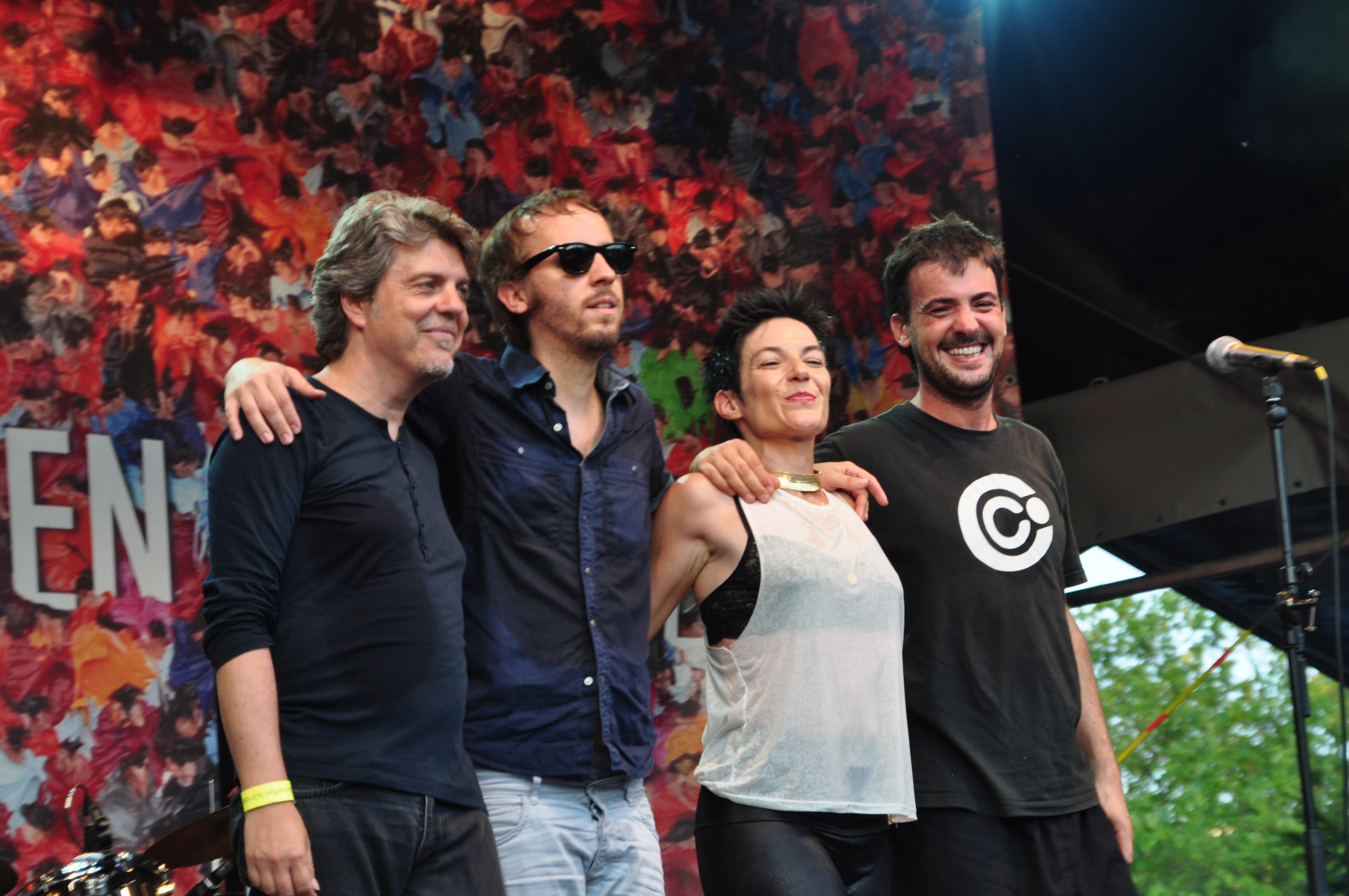
La Shica with 2013 group in Nuremberg

However dancing fell short and she was encouraged to start singing. Her first performance was at La Lupe de Chueca in Madrid, singing "La bien pagá" and "Ay, pena, penita pena". "I had to dance but I said I was going to sing. I remembered the songs I sang while I tended the clothes and the neighbors told me to shut up. I had two whiskeys and threw myself into it," she recalled in an interview.

She started with a group called Dios los Cría at the revival of the tablao Las Carboneras in Madrid with the Brazilian guitarist Fernando de la Rúa and rapper lyricist José Luis Montón as a guest composer.

== La Shica is born ==
In 2004, at 28, Rovayo shaved her head, ended her commitments in the tablaos, and began to prepare to start a new professional stage as "La Shica", an artistic name related to her height, only 1.58 meters (5.2 ft). "My boyfriend always says 'oh, my shica'," she explained in one of her first interviews in February 2008. After several years on the circuit of small venues, she signed a contract with DRO Records to produce her first album.

In March 2008 she presented her first album titled Trabajito de chinos, produced by Josete Ordóñez, in which she fuses diverse genres in search of a personal style, counting on hip hop and Spanish songs as main points of support. Singer Miguel Poveda contributed on "Dos carnes paralelas", as did Miguel Campello, a member of elbicho, on "Vicio". The song that serves as a touchstone and that articulates her sound is "Zíngara rapera", which emerged from her Paris stage, and whose chorus became a statement of her principles: "Zíngara rapera, con jazmines en el pelo y sudadera/flamenca hip hopera con vestido de volantes y unas playeras" (Gypsy rapper, with jasmine in her hair and sweatshirt / flamenco hip hopper with frilly dress and some t-shirts). In October 2008 she was honored with one of the Guilles prizes awarded by La Noche en Vivo, the association of live music halls of the Community of Madrid.

In 2010 La Shica released her second album, Supercop, also with DRO and produced by Javier Limón, an iconoclastic approach to the copla universe. Her group was made up of Fernando de la Rua on guitar, Miguel Rodrigáñez on double bass, Pablo Martín Jones on percussion, and La Popi and Ana Romero in the chorus, clapping and dancing live. Luis Domerq is the lyricist of several of her songs.

Also in 2010, Rovayo collaborated with Javier Limón on "Agua Misteriosa", on the album Mujeres de Agua, with the Mediterranean Sea and the voices of women as a guiding thread, dedicated to persecuted and silenced Iranian singers.

In 2011 she triumphed with two awards at the 15th edition of the Premios de la Música given by the Academy of Music Arts and Sciences as Artista Revelación for her album Supercop, and as Autor Revelación for her theme "Con Dinamita", on which she shared credits with Fernando de la Rúa, Héctor González, Luis Domercq, Miguel Rodrigáñez, and Pablo Martín Jones.

Pequeñas infidelidades (2012) is a bodevil – a comic monologue in which La Shica narrates the supposed amorous vicissitudes of a single woman who has had ups and downs with the opposite sex. She sings personal versions of songs by La Lupe, Paquita la del Barrio, Martirio, and Chavela Vargas. In the show she shared the stage with Josete Ordóñez, guitarist and producer of her first album.

In October 2013 she premiered Espain, dolor del bueno, a show written jointly with Andreu Buenafuente and directed by him, in which La Shica sings, dances, and debuts as an actress. It features a humorous review of the situation in Spain, decontextualizing culture, art, and music by performing Spanish and Latin American songs, "a montage that can be understood as a cocktail of Beyoncé, Lady Gaga, Lola Flores, and Björk. Singing is combined with electronic loops, toy pianos, and resources such as video creation, contemporary dance, and cabaret."

In 2014 she collaborated with Jarabe de Palo on "¿A donde vas?", the second single of the album Somos, also featuring Ximena Sariñana.

In 2014, she participated in the show La piel del huevo te lo da, directed by Sol Picó, in which she shared the stage with Picó herself, actress Candela Peña and the musicians Dani Tejedor (percussionist) and Bernat Guardia (double bass). The play, which delves into the role of women in today's society, was presented in May, as part of the Barcelona Ciutat Flamenco Festival, and in January 2015 premiered in Madrid at the Teatro del Barrio.

At the end of 2014 she released her third album Esa, on which she sings Spanish classics but also makes a tribute to Mexican artists with songs such as "La Llorona" and "Tres veces te engañé" by Paquita la del Barrio. She also has a duet with Natalia Lafourcade. The album's name comes from that of its opening track, "Yo soy esa".

At the end of 2014, a special point of reference for La Shica was set up for a few months in Mexico. Throughout her career she has made numerous international tours of Europe, the United States, and Asian countries such as India, Syria, Jordan, and Lebanon.

As of 2016 she was alternating her residence between Lima and Madrid.

== Discography ==
=== Albums ===
- 2008: Trabajito de chinos
- 2010: Supercop
- 2014: Esa

=== Collaborations ===
- 2005: "El Evangelio según mi jardinero", with Martín Buscaglia
- 2005: "De ayer a mañana", with Eliseo Parra
- 2007: "Adelantando", with Jarabe de Palo
- 2010: "Agua misteriosa", with Javier Limón on Mujeres de agua
- 2010: "Tengo", with Macaco on El vecindario
- 2014: "¿A dónde vas?", with Jarabe de Palo and Ximena Sariñana
- 2014: "En este momento", with Jenny and the Mexicats on Ome
- 2014: "Mujer, cántaro, niño", with Charo Bogarín (member of Tonolec), Patricia Sosa, and Sophie Oliver, collaborating on the Tonolec album Cantos de la Tierra sin Mal

La Shica has shared the stage with: Martirio, Bebe, Macaco, Amancio Prada, Rosendo, Barricada, Josemi Carmona, Rosario Flores, Bimba Bosé, Jorge Drexler, Pau Donés, and Manuel Carrasco, among others.

== Shows ==
- 2011: Pequeñas infidelidades
- 2013–2014: Espain. Dolor del bueno, co-written and directed by Andreu Buenafuente
- 2014–2016: La piel del huevo te lo da, together with Candela Peña and Sol Picó, directed by Sol Picó

== Awards ==
- 2008: Guilles Award
- 2011: Premios de la Música as Artista Revelación for her album Supercop, and as Autor Revelación for the theme "Con Dinamita"
