= La Vida de un Genio =

Studio album by A.B. Quintanilla y Los Kumbia All Starz
- Released: July 27, 2010
- Recorded: January 8–March 22, 2010
- Genre: Cumbia
- Length: 39:07 (Standard Edition); 52:24 (Deluxe Edition); 56:08 (iTunes Deluxe Edition)
- Label: Capitol Latin
- Producer: A.B. Quintanilla; Luigi Giraldo

A.B. Quintanilla y Los Kumbia All Starz chronology
Planeta Kumbia (2008)	La Vida de un Genio (2010)	Blanco y Negro (2013)

Singles from La Vida de un Genio
- 1. "Hipnótika" Released: April 13, 2010; 2. "Mentirosa" Released: August 24, 2010

La Vida de un Genio (English: The Life of a Genius) is the third studio album by Mexican-American cumbia group A.B. Quintanilla y Los Kumbia All Starz and the seventh studio album by Mexican-American musician A.B. Quintanilla. It was released on July 27, 2010, by EMI Latin and Capitol Latin. A digital deluxe edition containing interviews by A.B. Quintanilla about the songs and two versions of "Hipnótika" was also released on the same day on online music stores. A bonus song called "I'll Be There for You" is only included on the iTunes digital deluxe edition.

== Background ==
On August 26, 2009, A.B. Quintanilla y Los Kumbia All Starz debuted a new song called "Chica Fatal" on the program Don Francisco Presenta, transmitted by Univision, sung by A.B. Quintanilla and DJ Kane. They later performed the song again on Premios Oye! 2009 on November 24, 2009, this time sung by Ricky Rick and DJ Kane. It was thought to be the new single until A.B. Quintanilla confirmed it wasn't the new single and it would not be on the album, instead another song will be chosen for to be the new single. In March 2010, the music video was recorded for the new single in Los Angeles, California. On March 16, 2010, the MySpace profile for Kumbia All Starz was updated for the first time since November 11, 2008, confirming the new single will be "Hipnótika" featuring Voltio and Marciano Cantero from Los Enanitos Verdes, which was released on April 13, 2010. The album's name was revealed to be La Vida de un Genio and was set to be released on May 18, 2010, then changed on June 29, 2010, but then changed to be released on July 27, 2010. A.B. Quintanilla has been working on the album since September 2009. The album was recorded in 43 days between January 8, 2010, and March 22, 2010. The album's title, La Vida de un Genio (The Life of a Genius) is a tribute A.B. Quintanilla's father, Abraham Quintanilla, Jr., who steered his career as well as that of his late sister Selena. Similar in concept to Santana's Supernatural, the songs were either written or co-written by A.B. Quintanilla with featured vocals by various artists. Appearances on the album include Voltio, Marciano Cantero from Los Enanitos Verdes, Yeyo from The D.E.Y., T López, Shaila Dúrcal, Gilberto Santa Rosa, Luis Enrique, Andrés Castro, Jorge Celedón, Jimmy Zambrano, Ana Isabelle, Ender Thomas, La Shica, Albita, Alex Lora from El Tri, José Feliciano, Jon Secada, Reyli Barba, Colby O'Donis, Joey Montana and Los Dinos. This is the first studio album in seven years to include lead singer DJ Kane on a studio album by A.B. Quintanilla since the album 4 released in 2003. This is the first time Los Dinos have recorded a song together on an album in over 15 years since the death of Selena.

== Track listing ==
No.	Title	Writer(s)	Length
1.	"Hipnótika" (featuring Voltio and Marciano Cantero from Los Enanitos Verdes)	A.B. Quintanilla III, Luigi Giraldo, Marciano Cantero, Julio Ramos	3:19
2.	"Nací para Sufrir" (featuring José Feliciano and Los Dinos)	Quintanilla III, Giraldo	4:02
3.	"Nunca Te Voy a Olvidar" (featuring Reyli and Andrés Castro)	Quintanilla III, Giraldo, Andrés Castro, Reyli Barba	4:22
4.	"Invisible" (featuring Luis Enrique)	Quintanilla III, Giraldo, Luis Enrique	3:56
5.	"Muero por Ti" (featuring Shaila Dúrcal)	Quintanilla III, Giraldo	3:55
6.	"Me Equivoqué" (featuring Gilberto Santa Rosa)	Quintanilla III, Giraldo	3:28
7.	"Mentirosa" (featuring T López and Yeyo from The D.E.Y.)	Quintanilla III, Giraldo, Yeyo	3:53
8.	"Me Fascinas" (featuring Ana Isabelle, Albita, Ender Thomas, and La Shica)	Quintanilla III, Giraldo, Antonio Rayo, La Shica	3:24
9.	"El Día de los Muertos" (featuring Jorge Celedón, Álex Lora from El Tri, and Jimmy Zambrano)	Quintanilla III, Giraldo, Álex Lora	3:55
10.	"La Vida de un Genio" (featuring Jon Secada)	Quintanilla III, Giraldo	4:53

Digital Deluxe Edition
No.	Title	Writer(s)	Length
1.	"About Hipnótika"		0:55
2.	"Hipnótika" (featuring Voltio and Marciano Cantero from Los Enanitos Verdes)	Quintanilla III, Giraldo, Cantero, Ramos	3:19
3.	"About Nací para Sufrir"		0:28
4.	"Nací para Sufrir" (featuring José Feliciano and Los Dinos)	Quintanilla III, Giraldo	4:02
5.	"About Nunca Te Voy a Olvidar"		0:45
6.	"Nunca Te Voy a Olvidar" (featuring Reyli and Andrés Castro)	Quintanilla III, Giraldo, Castro, Barba	4:22
7.	"About Invisible"		0:39
8.	"Invisible" (featuring Luis Enrique)	Quintanilla III, Giraldo, Enrique	3:56
9.	"About Muero por Ti"		0:33
10.	"Muero por Ti" (featuring Shaila Dúrcal)	Quintanilla III, Giraldo	3:55
11.	"About Me Equivoqué"		0:37
12.	"Me Equivoqué" (featuring Gilberto Santa Rosa)	Quintanilla III, Giraldo	3:28
13.	"About Mentirosa"		0:29
14.	"Mentirosa" (featuring T López and Yeyo from The D.E.Y.)	Quintanilla III, Giraldo, Yeyo	3:53
15.	"About Me Fascinas"		0:36
16.	"Me Fascinas" (featuring Ana Isabelle, Albita, Ender Thomas, and La Shica)	Quintanilla III, Giraldo, Rayo, La Shica	3:24
17.	"About El Día de los Muertos"		1:18
18.	"El Día de los Muertos" (featuring Jorge Celedón, Álex Lora from El Tri, and Jimmy Zambrano)	Quintanilla III, Giraldo, Lora	3:55
19.	"About La Vida de un Genio"		0:53
20.	"La Vida de un Genio" (featuring Jon Secada)	Quintanilla III, Giraldo	4:53
21.	"Hipnótika (Urban Version)" (featuring Voltio and Marciano Cantero from Los Enanitos Verdes)	Quintanilla III, Giraldo, Cantero, Ramos	3:02
22.	"Hipnótika (Banda Version)" (featuring Voltio and Marciano Cantero from Los Enanitos Verdes)	Quintanilla III, Giraldo, Cantero, Ramos	3:02

Digital Deluxe Edition iTunes Bonus Track
No.	Title	Writer(s)	Length
23.	"I'll Be There for You" (featuring Colby O'Donis and Joey Montana)	Jason Cano, Robert Gomez III, Colby O'Donis, Joey Montana, Yeyo	3:44

Notes

- All tracks produced by A.B. Quintanilla III and Luigi Giraldo, except track 2, produced by A.B. Quintanilla III, Abraham Quintanilla, Jr., Suzette Quintanilla, and Luigi Giraldo

== Personnel ==
Kumbia All Starz

- A.B. Quintanilla III – bass guitar, backing vocals, composer, producer
- Jason "DJ Kane" Cano – vocals (provided lead vocals for tracks 1, 3, 4, 5, 7, 9 and bonus track 23)
- Ricardo "Ricky Rick" Ruiz Pérez – vocals (chorus)
- J.R. Lee Gomez, Jr. – vocals (chorus)
- Chris Pérez – guitar
- Nick Banda – keyboards
- Joey Jiménez – drums
- Robert "BoBBo" Gomez III – keyboards
- "El Animal" Noe "Gipper" Nieto, Jr. – accordion
- Luigi Giraldo – piano, keyboards, composer, producer

Additional musicians

- Reyli Barba – vocals (track 3)
- Marciano Cantero – vocals (track 1)
- Andrés Castro – guitar (track 3)
- Jorge Celedón – vocals (track 9)
- Los Dinos – vocals, instruments (track 2)
  - A.B. Quintanilla III – bass guitar (track 2)
  - Suzette Quintanilla – drums (track 2)
  - Chris Pérez – guitar (track 2)
  - Pete Astudillo – vocals (track 2)
  - Joe Ojeda – keyboards (track 2)
- Shaila Dúrcal – vocals (track 5)
- Luis Enrique – vocals (track 4)
- José Feliciano – vocals, guitar (track 2)
- Ana Isabelle – vocals (track 8)
- T López – vocals (track 7)
- Álex Lora – vocals, guitar (track 9)
- Joey Montana – vocals (bonus track 23)
- Colby O'Donis – vocals (bonus track 23)
- Abraham Quintanilla, Jr. – producer (track 2)
- Suzette Quintanilla – producer (track 2)
- Antonio "Rayito" Rayo – guitar (track 8)
- Albita Rodríguez – vocals (track 8)
- Gilberto Santa Rosa – vocals (track 6)
- Jon Secada – vocals (track 10)
- La Shica – vocals (track 8)
- Ender Thomas – vocals (track 8)
- Julio Voltio – vocals (track 1)
- Yeyo – vocals (track 7)
- Jimmy Zambrano – accordion (track 9)

== Charts ==
Chart (2010)	Peak position
US Billboard Top Latin Albums	9
US Billboard Regional Mexican Albums	3
