= Charo Bogarín =

Argentine singer

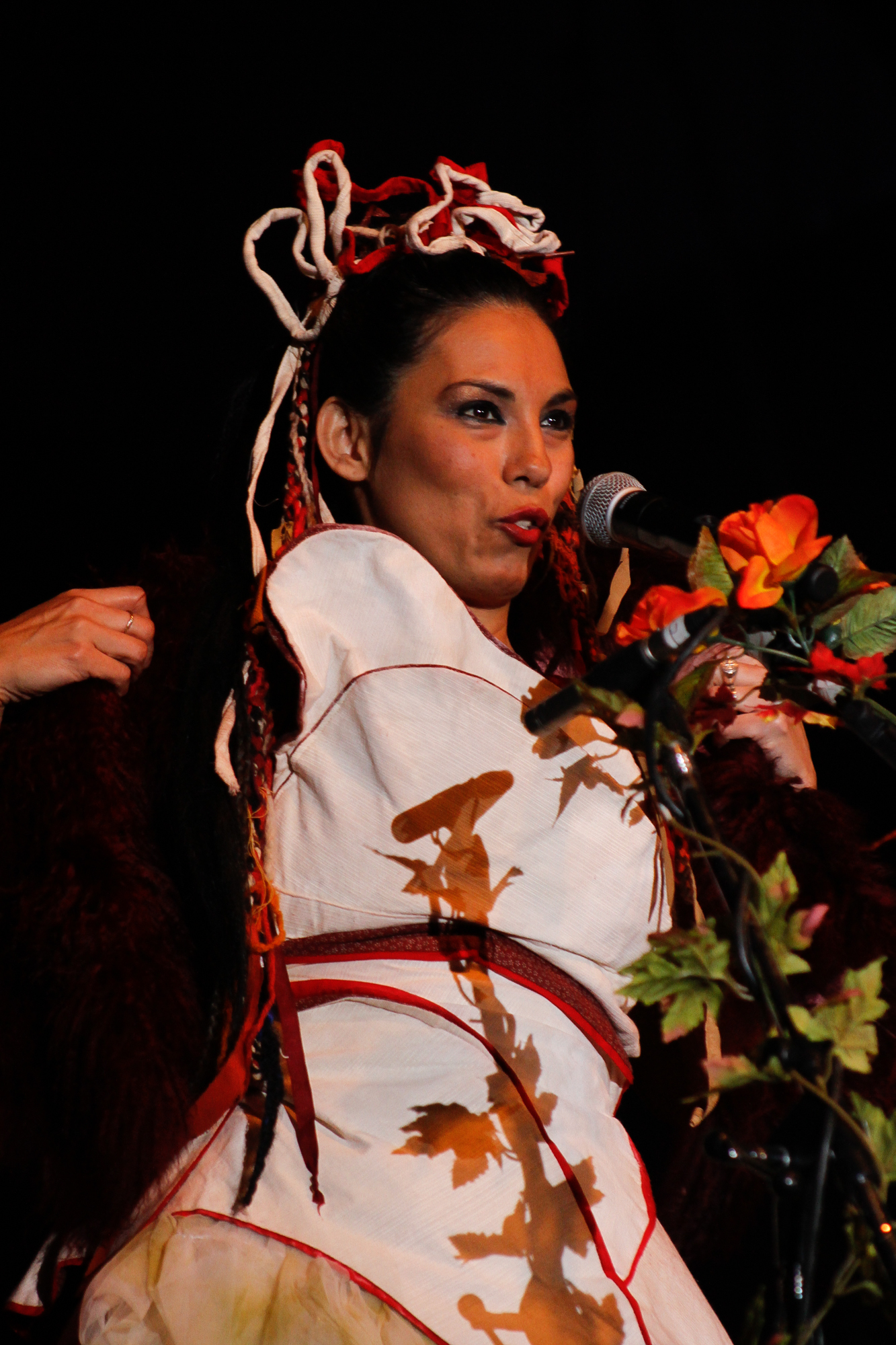
- Bogarín performing with Tonolec in 2011

Background information
- Born: 24 September 1972 (age 53); Clorinda, Formosa, Argentina
- Genres: Folk
- Occupations: Singer; songwriter
- Years active: 2000–present
- Labels: La Charo

Charo Bogarín (born 24 September 1972) is an Argentine singer, songwriter and actress. She is better known as half of the folclore duo Tonolec, alongside Diego Pérez.

In 2020, she starred in a biopic miniseries as the Mapuche Tehuelche singer-songwriter Aimé Painé.

== Background ==
Bogarín was born on 24 September 1972 in Clorinda, Formosa Province into a family of Guaraní descent. She is the great-granddaughter of cacique Guayraré. Her father, Francisco "Pancho" Bogarín, was a peronist politician who was "disappeared" by the military dictatorship in 1976. After her father's abduction, she moved with her mother and her sister to Resistencia, Chaco.

== Musical career ==
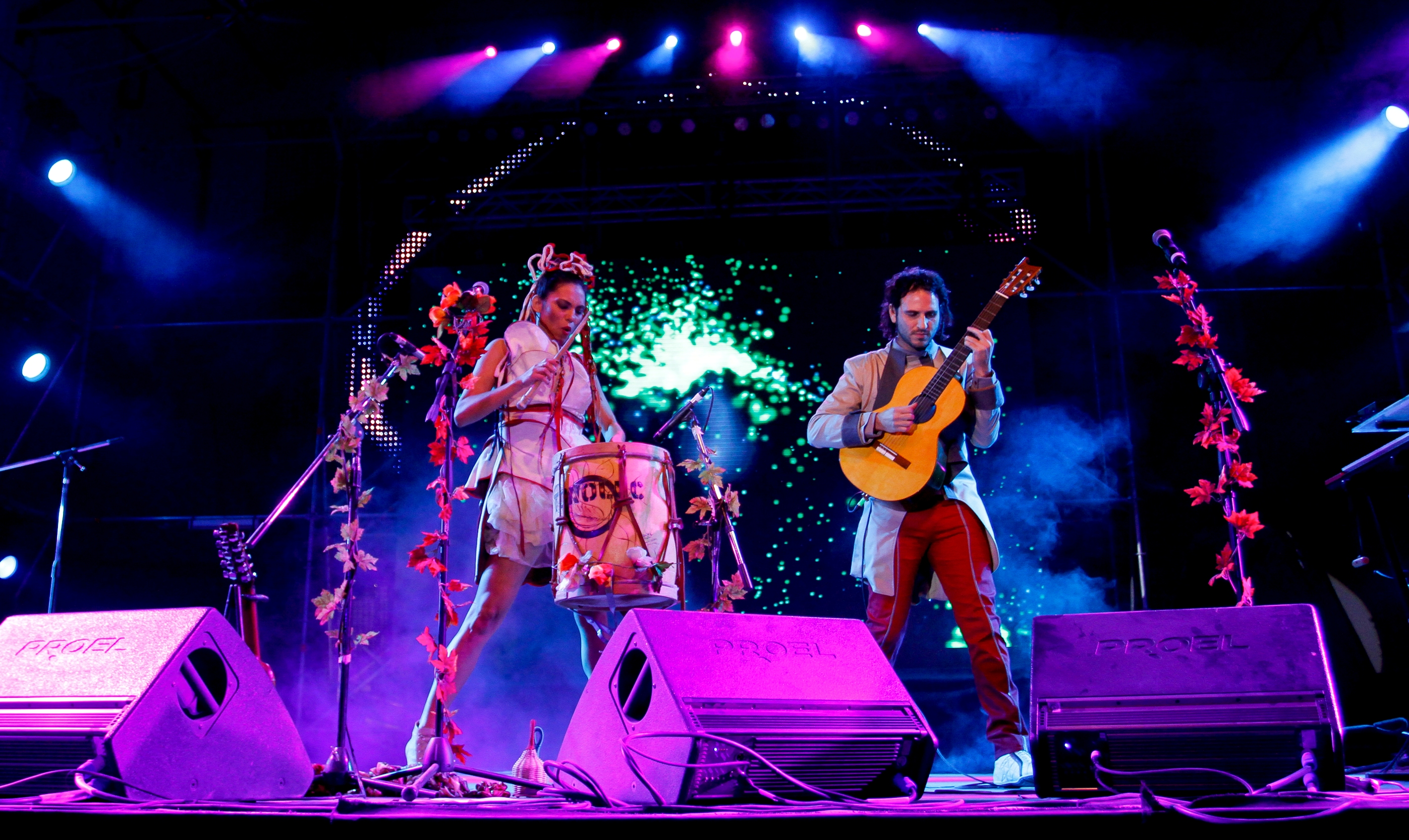
Tonolec performing in Tecnópolis in 2011.

Bogarín formed what would become Tonolec in 2000 with Diego Pérez, a native of Resistencia who was living in Córdoba at the time. After spending several years researching Qom musical culture, they began experimenting by mixing Qom music with Mbyá Guaraní folk singing and electronic music. Bogarín has cited the influence of Chelaalapí Qom Choir, with whom Tonolec has collaborated several times. Much of Tonolec's music is sung in the Qom language, as well as in Guaraní.

In 2022, she was appointed vice-president of the INAMU (Instituto Nacional de la Música), an Argentine government agency promoting musical endeavors since 2012. As part of the institute's authorities, she has stated her intention to promote women in the music industry and safekeep indigenous musical traditions.

== Personal life ==
Bogarín has a daughter, Gala, whom she raised on her own as the father died when Gala was a toddler. She has been in a relationship with actor Juan Palomino since 2018.

== Discography ==
With Tonolec

- Tonolec (2005)
- Plegaria del árbol negro (2008)
- Folk - Los pasos labrados (2010)
- Tonolec acústico (DVD) (2011)
- Cantos de la tierra sin mal (2014)
- Tonolec: Cancionero (anexado al libro La Celebración: Cancionero 2005-2015) (2015)
- Mitai (2017)

As a solo artist

- La Charo (2018)
- Legado (2019)
- La Formoseña (2022)
