= Cultrun =

Percussion instrument

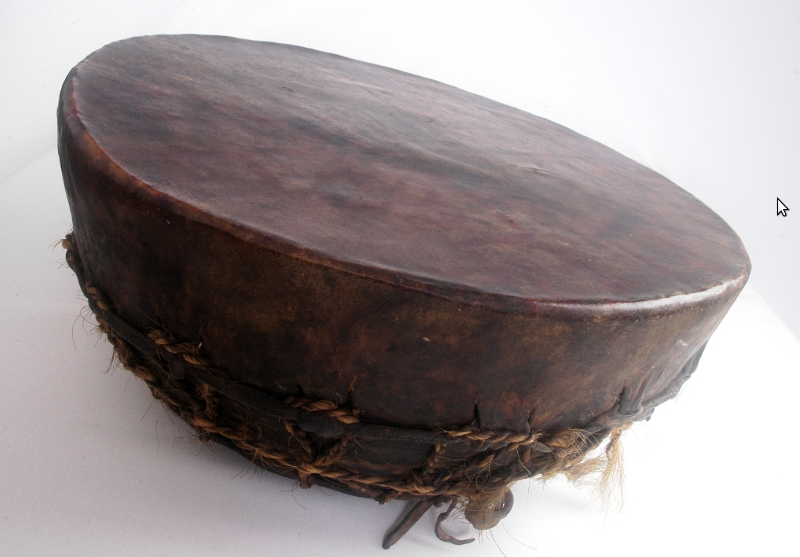
Cultrun. Museo Azzarini collection.

The cultrun (from Spanish: cultrún, and Mapudungun: kultrung) is a percussion instrument used by the Mapuche in Chile and Argentina.

== Role in Mapuche culture ==
The cultrun is a ceremonial drum and the most important musical instrument in Mapuche culture. It is used by the machi (healer or sorcerer) for religious and cultural rituals. It is also used during the annual fertility rite of Ngillatun.

It is approximately 35 to 40 cm in diameter and has a height of 12 to 15 cm. The wooden body is made from laurel, beech or lingual, cut in winter to avoid splitting.

It can be played in two different ways, either held in the hand and struck with a drumstick or resting on the floor and played with two sticks. The cultrun is sometimes accompanied in performance by other musical instruments, such as the lolkiñ, a large, circular wind instrument.

During rituals such as the ngillatun, sacred songs composed of non-men singing and dancing are performed. Machi will play the cultrun to guide the ceremony as a pulse, direct the dancing, and sing simultaneously.

In ceremony, the beating of the cultrun is a participatory musical process. Often, while Machi beat the drum, often to rid of evil spirits, herbal remedies will be prepared while animal protectors dance to the rhythm to initiate the healing process. Thus, the cultrun's beat marks a “dramatic performative ritualization of the fight against evil forces, illnesses, and death."

Mapuche epistemology is aural and oral. As described by anthropologist Ana Mariella Bacigalupo, in this worldview, “Sound is central to all thought and communication, and concepts like words cannot be picked up and attached to things but are continually passing in and out of existence”. In this vision, scholars have asserted that the sound of the cultrun is of the utmost importance in Mapuche epistemology, because rather than passively transmitting a musical expression, it forms part of Mapuche ways of knowing and being.

== Origin ==
Most scholars on the cultrun posit that the instrument is Indigenous to the Mapuche, emerging before the Mapuche are thought to have contact with the Aymara or the later Inca Empire. Other afro-centric studies have provocatively suggested that the cultrun has an “undeniable africanness” and has origins in Mapuche interactions with Afro-Chilean populations during the colonial period. Currently in Chile, none of the above proposals is widely accepted by both the Chilean population and the Mapuche or Mapuche/Tehuelche population since none of these grants more than conjectures by association, since due to the rapid degradation of the material, it hardly lasts over time in a climate like southern Chile, and unlike what is exposed in "El origen africano del Kultrún mapuche" the Mapuche culture has a long history of both crafts and music, so the theories of authenticity remain without unrefuted.

Spanish settlers took a particular interest in this instrument during the colonial period.

== In Scholarship ==
The only scholarly ethnomusicologal work that exclusively studies the cultrun is written by the Chilean music researcher Maria Ester Grebe. Grebe's research combines a deep dive into the cultrun and its significance and an explanation of how her approach to the cultrun can fill methodological gaps in ethnomusicology research. Grebe argues that the largest methodological problem within ethnomusicology is that some ethnomusicologists solely analyze music without being in conversation with other cultural aspects, whereas others analyze cultural systems without richly analyzing musical elements. She references the work of foundational ethnomusicologist Alan Merriam, who argues that the “dual nature” of ethnomusicology as anthropological and musicological is a fact of the discipline, and that these aspects ought to be fused. Yet, the unsolved methodological questions for Grebe are twofold—that ethnomusicologists have not settled upon a system of cultural units to analyze the relationships between music and cultural contexts, nor have they settled upon methods or procedures to establish these relationships. To solve these dilemmas, she proposes that the concepts of worldview, myth and its ritual re-enactments, symbolic behaviour or objects can serve as the necessary units to establish these relationships, and that ethnomusicologists ought to carry out descriptive depth studies with layered levels of abstraction and analysis. Her study analyzes the cultrun in order to demonstrate this approach: understanding the cultrun to be a micro-cosmos reflective of the Mapuche worldview and taking upon the layered analysis for which she advocates. With Grebe's work so highly cited in Indigenous South American ethnomusicology, much of the scholarship on the cultrun draws from this ethnomusicological approach.

Because of the expansive role of the cultrun in Mapuche epistemology, other ethnomusicologists have often challenged the framing of the Western ontological concept of “music” as being able to encapsulate the expansive nature of Mapuche music. Within the discipline, such debates have been a feature of ethnomusicological discourse since the late 1990s. Musicologist Gary Tomlinson identifies music not as an “ideologically neutral, cross-cultural array of sounding phenomena”, but instead, a “constructed cultural category” whose emergence is eurocentric, largely undefined, and opaque. Ethnomusicologist-cum-sound studies scholar Deborah Wong furthers the critique by calling for ethnomusicologists to divest from the construct of music for its ethnocentrism, inherent links to aesthetics, and placement beyond sociality—instead relying upon a vision of music as a sonal phenomenon. However, this view directly contrasts that of Merriam, who explicitly argues that “music cannot be defined as a phenomenon of sound alone”. By extension, such a framing contrasts the framing of Grebe's seminal work on the cultrun and those who heed this approach.

Ethnomusiciologists have indeed taken up such an approach. Ethnomusicologist Jacob Rekedal, who studies Mapuche music, argued that Mapuche “music” was beyond the boundaries of music as a cultural category. Carol Robertson-DeCarbo, whose studied the Mapuche tayil song, produced an early criticism of music as an ontological category insofar as the lack of a traditional concept of music within the Mapuche language. Robertson-DeCarbo's work extends, serving as a mounted criticism against the reliance of ethnomusicology on "music" as a conceptual category. These scholars Mapuche expressions typically understood as “music” are forms of communication—often, recitations of genealogies in combination with instruments and corporal movements that inform cosmovision–that the term music cannot encapsulate. Given this new, critical understanding, recent scholars of the cultrun—such as those of Bacigalupo, Spanish musicologist José Velásquez Arce, or Chilean historian Juan Gustavo Núñez Olguín—use the language of “sonority” to describe these expressions.

Beyond this foundational work, other ethnomusicologists have explored the relationship between the cultrun and gender constructions. At large, ethnomusicologists have criticized the field for primarily centering masculine forms of music production, as much scholarship has focused on the most public forms of musical performance, which has often entailed masculinist musics. Historically, much of the ethnomusicological focus on women's musical activity has largely been descriptive and surrounded female initiation, child care, and birth. Ethnomusicologists thus have considered the performance of the cultrun, as it is central in highly-public sacred songs performed exclusively by non-men, as one of the most unusual aspects of Mapuche music. For this reason, much of the ethnomusicological representation of the cultrun is tied to gender analysis.

== Gender and Cultrun ==
The cultrun is symbolically and contextually connected to varying gender performances in Mapuche societies. Like all percussion instruments in Mapuche society, the cultrun is traditionally performed by women and non-binary people. In fact, all musical expressions in sacred or ritual contexts, called ül, are performed exclusively by non-men. Many Mapuche conceive of the cultrun as a womb—a space gendered as female. The cultrun itself is often understood as having four-fold paired gendered representations. Machi often place pairs and groups of four objects that are understood as male or female inside the cultrun. Moreover, the four-fold symbolism painted on the drum represents the Mapuche deity Ngünechen—a family composed of Old Man, Old Woman, and Young Man and Young Woman. Thus, the cultrun is gendered as feminine, but, importantly, has masculine and feminine elements in its symbolism.

Throughout Mapuche history, Machi healers have been people of varied genders. During early periods of conflict with the Chilean state, many machi were male in order to evoke ancestral lineages related to war, which are traditionally masculinized. Today, however, with communal emphases on healing, most machi are women or male machi weye gendered as feminine as healing is thought to flow from women in Mapuche epistemology.

In the context of the paired genderization of the cultrun, and the complex gendered history of machi, the aforementioned anthropologist Bacigalupo argues that the playing of the cultrun allows for machi to continually subvert gender performances. During rituals, Machi will often move between masculine and feminine performances to express notions of kinship, marriage, and mastery. As a result of these performances, Machi project themselves as having both masculine and feminine aspects of their personhood, an understanding which approximates them to the Mapuche creator who similarly professes these aspects. This phenomenon was dubbed “cogenderism” by Bacigalupo.

Coming from this understanding, ethnomusicological scholarship typically delineates four types of performances in relation to inter-gender relationships: performances that maintain gender dynamics, performances that appear to maintain such dynamics in order to protect other values, performances that protest yet maintain dynamics, and ones that reject and threaten such orders. In this vein, Bacigalupo argues that machi “subvert various gender ideologies” through their co-gendered performances, as they assert performances that allow them to assert their power, gender fluidity, and co-gendered masculinity and femininity—going against dominant gender orders in their societies. The ethnomusicologist Veronica Doubleday names the cultrun, because its symbolism is explicitly four-fold, masculine and feminine—that is, co-gendered—as an “essential tool” in this subversion.

== Urban Protests ==
Performances of the cultrun have become popular in non-spiritual settings, particularly urban demonstrations, visible especially during Chile's Estallido Social movement beginning in 2019. In their analyses of this visibility, some scholars have gone as far as to understand the sound of the cultrun in contemporary urban protests—as part of larger performances of Mapuche sonarity—to represent the performance of traditional sacred Mapuche rituals in the protest context. This view understands Mapuche activism as a performance of identity symbolized by the audibility of Mapuche instruments.
