= Roberto Lara =

Argentine musician

Roberto Lara (May 23, 1927 – November 3, 1988) was an Argentine musician. He was born in Tres Arroyos (province of Buenos Aires), Argentina.

He began his musical studies at the age of 7 and spent the rest of his life as a professional guitarist.

In Argentina he performed as a soloist in the most prestigious institutions, among them the theaters Colón, Cervantes, San Martín, Odeón. With worldwide concerts as a soloist and as an accompanist, he traveled to Brazil, Mexico, France, Germany, Switzerland, Poland and Hungary.
