= María Ester Grebe =

Chilean ethnomusicologist

María Ester Grebe Vicuña (July 11, 1928 – November 1, 2012) was a Chilean anthropologist and ethnomusicologist focusing on the Indigenous peoples of Chile.

== Biography ==
María Ester Grebe was born in 1928 in Arica, Chile. She studied musicology at the University of Chile, graduating with a bachelor's in 1965. After further studies at the University of California and Indiana University in the late 1960s, then the University of Chile in the 1970s, she received a doctorate in musicology from Queen's University Belfast, in 1980.

Grebe had a long career as an anthropologist. She primarily researched the indigenous peoples of Chile, traveling up and down the country to attend festivals and ceremonies, and interviewing a wide variety of subjects. A longtime professor in the Department of Anthropology at the University of Chile, she taught there until her retirement in 2008. She also worked within the Department of Medicine, studying Mapuche traditional medicine, but she is best known for her work in the field of ethnomusicology, studying the musical traditions of the Mapuche and other Indigenous peoples of Chile. On two occasions, in 1964 and 1977, she was awarded a Guggenheim Fellowship to pursue her musicological research.

She published several books, notably 1998's Culturas indígenas de Chile: un estudio preliminar ("Indigenous Cultures of Chile: A Preliminary Study") and 1967's The Chilean Verso: A Study in Musical Archaism.

In 2012, Ethnomedia released a two-volume collection of recordings produced by Grebe in Indigenous communities in northern Chile, titled Aymara 1976-1977 and Aymara 1976-1983. She died a few months later, at age 84, in Santiago. On her death, anthropologist Mauricio Pineda of Ethnomedia called her "one of the continent's most distinguished ethnomusicologists." The Archivo María Ester Grebe Vicuña has continued to release ethnographic recordings from her archives since her death.
