= Ingeniero Luis A. Huergo =

Coordinates: 39°05′S 67°14′W

- Municipality and village
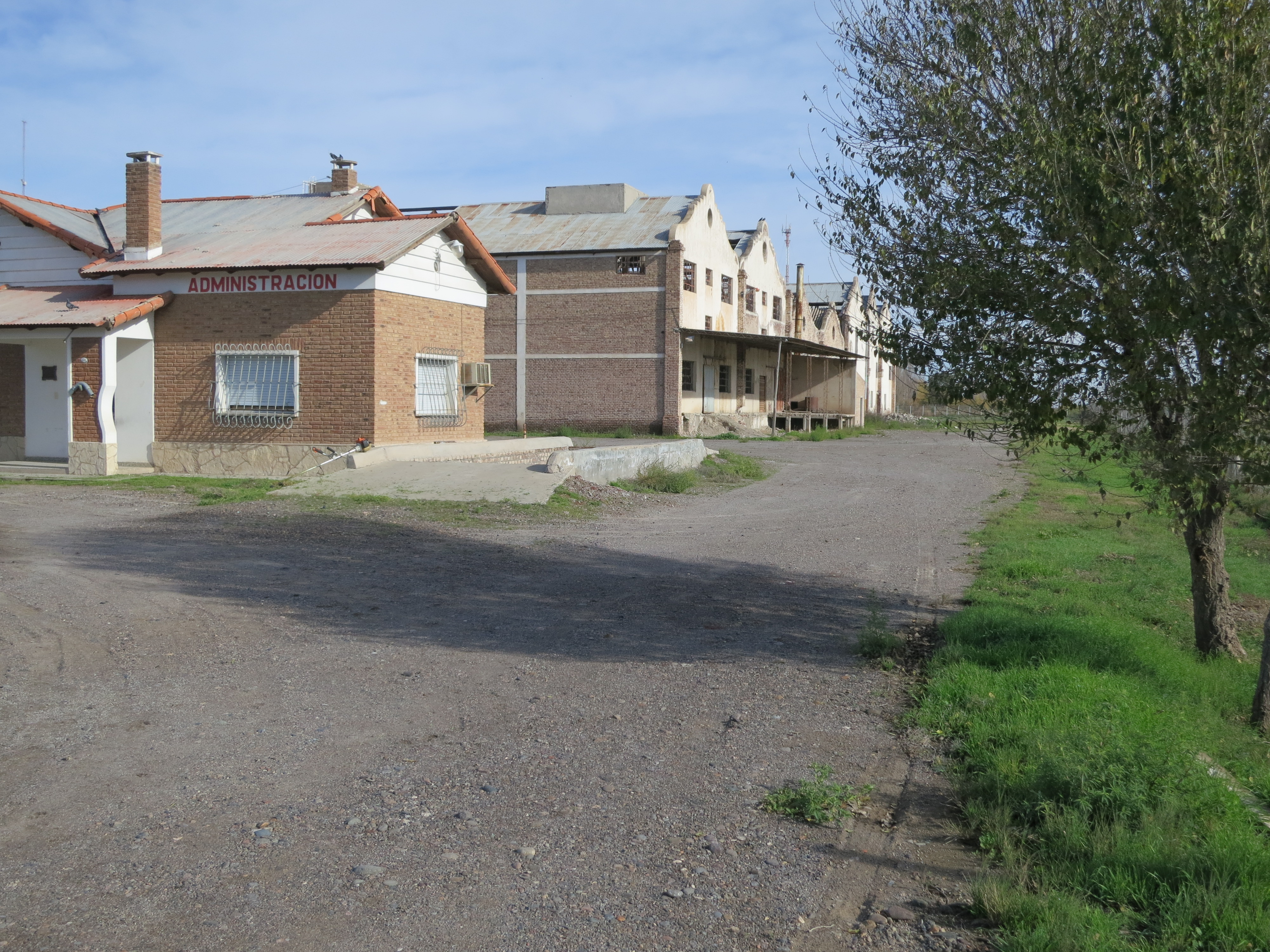

- Coat of arms
- Interactive map of Ingeniero Luis A. Huergo
- Country: Argentina
- Province: Río Negro
- Department: General Roca
- Time zone: UTC−3 (ART)
- Climate: BWk

Ingeniero Luis A. Huergo is a village and municipality in Río Negro Province in Argentina.

== Notable people ==
- Aimé Painé (1943—1987), an Argentine singer of Mapuche and Tehuelche origin
