= Elektro Kumbia (album) =

Studio album by A.B. Quintanilla y Los Kumbia All Starz
- Released: June 30, 2017
- Recorded: 2016–2017
- Genre: Cumbia, pop
- Length: 43:20
- Label: DEL
- Producer: A.B. Quintanilla; Luigi Giraldo

A.B. Quintanilla y Los Kumbia All Starz chronology
Éxitos en Vivo (2014)	Elektro Kumbia (2017)

Singles from Elektro Kumbia
- 1. "Piña Colada Shot" Released: January 27, 2017; 2. "La Aventura" Released: May 5, 2017; 3. "Pasito Tun Tun" Released: June 30, 2017

Elektro Kumbia is the fifth studio album by Mexican-American cumbia group A.B. Quintanilla y Los Kumbia All Starz (credited as A.B. Quintanilla y Elektro Kumbia) and the ninth studio album by Mexican-American musician A.B. Quintanilla. It was released on June 30, 2017 by DEL Records. The album was originally titled Kumbia Shots before being changed to Elektro Kumbia.

== Track listing ==
No.	Title	Writer(s)	Length
1.	"Intro"	A.B. Quintanilla III, Luigi Giraldo, Nick Banda	0:26
2.	"Piña Colada Shot"	Miguel Bosé Dominguin, Miguel Matamoros, Wilfredo Carme Martinez Mattos, Calixto Antonio Ochoa, Rosa María Girón Ávila	3:39
3.	"Te Extraño, Te Olvido, Te Amo" (featuring Double A)	Carlos Lara	3:40
4.	"Yo Quiero Bailar Contigo"	Quintanilla III, Giraldo, Banda	3:26
5.	"La Chica Fresa"	Jose Luis Gomez Gonzalez	3:12
6.	"La Aventura" (featuring Saga y Sonyc)	Quintanilla III, Giraldo, Banda, Juan Diego Medina, Cristhian Mena, Johnatan Villa	3:50
7.	"Pasito Tun Tun" (featuring Claudio Yarto)	José Carbó Menéndez, Claudio Yarto	4:00
8.	"Ella"	Quintanilla III, Giraldo, Banda	3:23
9.	"Duele"	Quintanilla III, Giraldo	3:37
10.	"Tu"	Quintanilla III, Giraldo, Banda	3:47
11.	"Por Que"	Quintanilla III, Giraldo, Banda	3:23
12.	"Dicen" (featuring Baltazar Hinojoza)	Giraldo	3:29
13.	"Dame Tu Amor"	Quintanilla III, Giraldo	3:28
