= Maika Makovski =

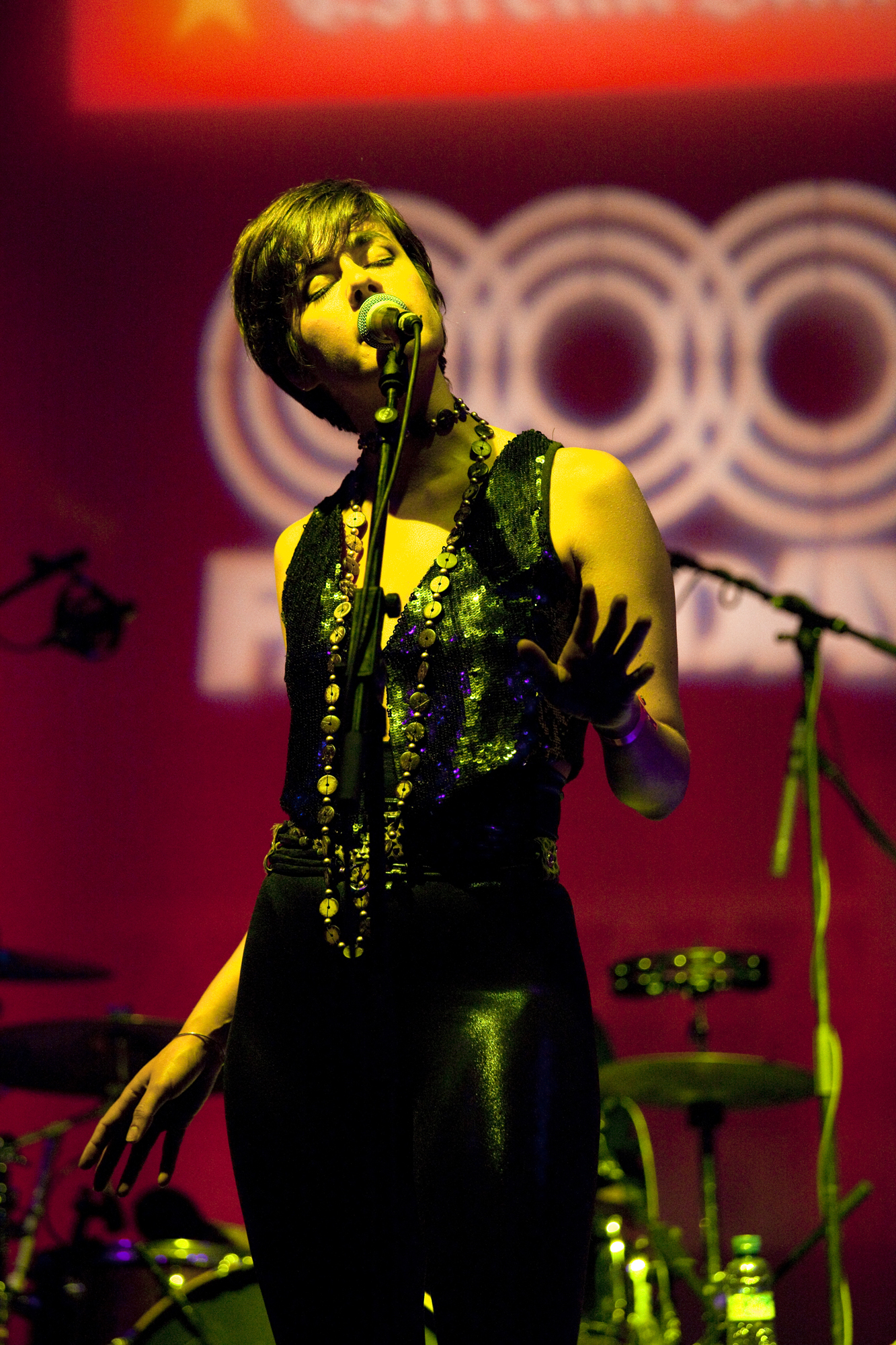
- Makovski in Barcelona (2010)

Background information
- Born: 1983 (age 42–43)
- Genres: indie rock, alternative rock
- Occupations: Singer, songwriter, instrumentalist
- Instruments: Guitar; piano

Maika Makovski (born 1983) is a Spanish songwriter, singer, guitarist and pianist of Macedonian and Andalucian descent.

Makovski started writing songs at 12 and performing live at 14. At 15 she won her first professional recognition in a major local contest with a jury formed of members of Sony Music, Rockdelux and RNE (Spain's National Radio), and has won other awards such as Altaveu Frontera '03, Balears Sona '02 and Eurofest '02 in Macedonia.

Between 1998 and 2003, Makovski changed her country of residence repeatedly before finally settling in Barcelona to record her first album Kradiaw (2005, PAE), which brought her to the attention of the mainstream press.

Between 2005 and 2007, Makovski commuted between New York and Barcelona, touring extensively with artists such as The Dubliners and the Jayhawks, Her second album Kraj so Koferot (2007, Wildpunk Records) was a more intimate record which drew equal acclaim from the press and the public.

In 2009, Makovski and her band recorded 12 new songs under the production guidance of John Parish for Maika Makovski, her first album to receive an international release and attention.

From 2011 to 2013, Makovski juggled the release and touring of her albums Desaparecer (2011) and Thank you for the Boots (2012) with the writing, performing and the musical direction of Calixto Bieito's theatrical productions Desaparecer (2011 – Teatre Romea / Festival Grec), Forests (2012 – BIT/Birmingham Repertory Theatre) and Leonce und Lena (2013 – Residenz Theater).

In 2015, she released her first live album, Live – Apolo!, and recorded the album Chinook Wind, released in 2016 and produced once more by Parish.

In 2018 she became the host of “La Hora Musa”, a live music television show on Spain's National TV channel “La2”. She's interviewed artists from the likes of Sharleen Spitteri (Texas), Rufus Wainwright, Cat Power or the Hellacopters.

She's currently working on her 8th album, titled “Heart” and recorded in Tucson, Arizona.

Makovski is a trained artist and the artwork that accompanies her releases makes use of her paintings and photography.

== Discography ==
- Kradiaw (2005)
- Kraj so Koferot (2007)
- Maika Makovski (2010)
- Desaparecer (2011)
- Thank You for the Boots (2012)
- Live – Apolo! (2015)
- Chinook Wind (2016)
- MKMK (2021)
- 4 Tucson Tracks (EP) (2023)
