= Blanco y Negro (song) =

Song by A.B. Quintanilla y Los Kumbia All Starz

Single by A.B. Quintanilla y Los Kumbia All Starz

from the album Blanco y Negro
- Released: August 27, 2013
- Recorded: 2013
- Genre: Cumbia
- Length: 3:34
- Label: Universal Music Latin, Siente Music
- Songwriters: A.B. Quintanilla, Luigi Giraldo, Descemer Bueno
- Producers: A.B. Quintanilla, Luigi Giraldo

A.B. Quintanilla y Los Kumbia All Starz singles chronology
"Solo" (2012)	"Blanco y Negro" (2013)	"Piña Colada Shot" (2017)

"Blanco y Negro" (English: "Black and White") is a song by Mexican American cumbia group A.B. Quintanilla y Los Kumbia All Starz. It was released on August 27, 2013, as the second single from his eighth studio album Blanco y Negro (2013).

== Music video ==
The music video was directed by Mark Muñoz and produced by Muñoz's company Made Films. It was released in October 2013. The video shows A.B. Quintanilla and the Kumbia All Starz performing the song along with a model. The video is in black and white with a few color shots on specific parts.

== Track listing ==
- Digital download
1. "Blanco y Negro" – 3:34

== Personnel ==
- Written by A.B. Quintanilla, Luigi Giraldo, and Descemer Bueno
- Produced by A.B. Quintanilla and Luigi Giraldo
- Lead vocals by Jesús "Isbo" Isbóseth and Ramón Vargas
- Background vocals by A.B. Quintanilla
