= Chiquilla =

Single by A.B. Quintanilla Y Los Kumbia All Starz

from the album Ayer Fue Kumbia Kings, Hoy Es Kumbia All Starz
- Released: September 20, 2006
- Recorded: 2006
- Genre: Cumbia
- Length: 3:20 (Single Version); 3:30 (Album Version)
- Label: EMI
- Songwriters: A.B. Quintanilla III; Luigi Giraldo
- Producer: A.B. Quintanilla III

A.B. Quintanilla Y Los Kumbia All Starz singles chronology
"Chiquilla" (2006)	"Parece Que Va A Llover" (2007)

"Chiquilla" (Little Girl) is a song by A.B. Quintanilla Y Los Kumbia All Starz. It is the first single from their debut studio album Ayer Fue Kumbia Kings, Hoy Es Kumbia All Starz. "Chiquilla" reached #7 on "Hot Latin Tracks", #9 on "Latin Regional Mexican Airplay", #26 on "Latin Pop Airplay" and #31 on "Latin Tropical Airplay".

== Track listing ==
- Digital download
1. "Chiquilla" – 3:20

== Versions ==
- "Chiquilla (Single Version)" – 3:20
- "Chiquilla (Album Version)" – 3:30
- "Chiquilla (Salsa Version)" – 3:59
- "Chiquilla (Bachata Version)" – 3:08
- "Chiquilla (Portuguese Version)" – 3:22

== Charts ==
Chart (2009)	Peak position
U.S. Billboard Hot Latin Songs	7
U.S. Billboard Latin Regional Mexican	9
U.S. Billboard Latin Pop Songs	26
