= Ayer Fue Kumbia Kings, Hoy Es Kumbia All Starz =

Studio album by A.B. Quintanilla y Los Kumbia All Starz
- Released: October 3, 2006
- Recorded: 2006
- Genre: Cumbia
- Length: 47:25
- Label: EMI Latin
- Producer: A.B. Quintanilla

A.B. Quintanilla y Los Kumbia All Starz chronology
Ayer Fue Kumbia Kings, Hoy Es Kumbia All Starz (2006)	Planeta Kumbia (2008)

Singles from Ayer Fue Kumbia Kings, Hoy Es Kumbia All Starz
- 1. "Chiquilla" Released: September 19, 2006; 2. "Parece Que Va a Llover" Released: April 6, 2007; 3. "Speedy Gonzales" Released: June 22, 2007; 4. "Mami/Anoche No Dormí" Released: October 18, 2007

Professional ratings
Review scores
Source	Rating
AllMusic	3/5 stars

Ayer Fue Kumbia Kings, Hoy Es Kumbia All Starz (English: Yesterday Was Kumbia Kings, Today Is Kumbia All Starz) is the debut studio album by Mexican-American cumbia group A.B. Quintanilla y Los Kumbia All Starz and the fifth studio album by Mexican-American musician A.B. Quintanilla. It was released on October 3, 2006, by EMI Latin. The fan edition was released on October 2, 2007. It has all the songs from the standard edition plus two more tracks and the music videos for "Chiquilla", "Parece Que Va a Llover", and "Speedy Gonzales".

== Track listing ==
No.	Title	Writer(s)	Length
1.	"Intro"		0:11
2.	"Mami"	A.B. Quintanilla III, Luigi Giraldo, Eliseo Diosdado, Ricardo Ruiz Pérez	3:48
3.	"Anoche No Dormí"	Howard Greenfield, Neil Sedaka	3:32
4.	"Un Minuto Más"	Quintanilla III, Giraldo	3:34
5.	"Dijiste"	Quintanilla III, Giraldo	3:28
6.	"Chiquilla"	Quintanilla III, Giraldo	3:30
7.	"Aquí"	Roque MD (Morales Diosdado)	3:38
8.	"Parece Que Va a Llover"	Antonio Matas	3:59
9.	"Que Te Amo"	Roque MD (Morales Diosdado)	3:38
10.	"Fan Número Uno"	Quintanilla III, Giraldo	4:13
11.	"Speedy Gonzales"	David Hess, Buddy Kaye, Ethel Lee	3:24
12.	"Chiquilla (Sergio George Salsa Remix)"	Quintanilla III, Giraldo	3:59
13.	"Chiquilla (SP & JKEY Bachata Remix)"	Quintanilla III, Giraldo	3:08
14.	"Chiquilla (Marcello Azevedo Portugués Remix)"	Quintanilla III, Giraldo	3:22

Fan Edition
No.	Title	Writer(s)	Length
1.	"Intro"		0:11
2.	"Mami"	Quintanilla III, Giraldo, Diosdado, Ruiz Pérez	3:48
3.	"Anoche No Dormí"	Greenfield, Sedaka	3:32
4.	"Un Minuto Más"	Quintanilla III, Giraldo	3:34
5.	"Dijiste"	Quintanilla III, Giraldo	3:28
6.	"Chiquilla"	Quintanilla III, Giraldo	3:30
7.	"Aquí"	Roque MD (Morales Diosdado)	3:38
8.	"Parece Que Va a Llover"	Antonio Matas	3:59
9.	"Que Te Amo"	Roque MD (Morales Diosdado)	3:38
10.	"Fan Número Uno"	Quintanilla III, Giraldo	4:13
11.	"Speedy Gonzales"	Hess, Kaye, Lee	3:24
12.	"Chiquilla (Versión Salsa)"	Quintanilla III, Giraldo	3:59
13.	"Chiquilla (Versión Bachata)"	Quintanilla III, Giraldo	3:08
14.	"Chiquilla (Versión Portugués)"	Quintanilla III, Giraldo	3:22
15.	"Mamacita Dónde Está Santa Claus"	Rod Parker, Al Grenier	3:22
16.	"Mami/Anoche No Dormí"	Quintanilla III, Giraldo, Diosdado, Ruiz Pérez, Greenfield, Sedaka	3:44

Fan Edition Music Videos
No.	Title	Writer(s)	Length
1.	"Chiquilla"	Quintanilla III, Giraldo	3:22
2.	"Parece Que Va a Llover"	Matas	3:59
3.	"Speedy Gonzales"	Hess, Kaye, Lee	3:24

Notes

- "Anoche No Dormí" is a Spanish-language cover of "Another Sleepless Night", a 1959 song written by Howard Greenfield and Neil Sedaka, recorded by Sedaka, and recorded and released as a single by Jimmy Clanton in 1960
- "Mamacita Dónde Está Santa Claus" first appeared on Navidad con Amigos 2006, released on December 1, 2006, and re-released on Navidad con Amigos 2007 on November 30, 2007. The music video was released on the Navidad con Amigos DVD on September 18, 2007.

== Personnel ==
Kumbia All Starz

- A.B. Quintanilla III – bass guitar, backing vocals, composer, producer
- Irvin "Pee Wee" Salinas – vocals
- Ricardo "Ricky Rick" Ruiz Pérez – vocals
- Roque Morales Diosdado – vocals
- Memo Morales Diosdado – vocals
- Chris Pérez – guitar
- Nick Banda – keyboards
- Joey Jiménez – drums
- Robert "BoBBo" Gomez III – keyboards, arranger, engineer
- "El Animal" Noe "Gipper" Nieto, Jr. – accordion
- Luigi Giraldo – keyboards, producer, arranger, engineer, A&R, vocal director

Additional musicians

- Marcello Azevedo – guitar, percussion, programming, vocals, producer, bass
- Alberto Barros – trombone, arranger, producer
- Veve Calasans – percussion, vocals
- Manuel Calderón – A&R
- John DiPuccio – violin
- Robert "LB" Dorsey – mixing
- Sayyd Droullard – assistant
- Rafael Elvira – violin
- Scott Flavin – violin
- Orlando J. Forte – violin
- Javier Garza – mixing
- Sergio George – piano, arranger, producer, mixing
- Chris Glansdorp – cello
- Henry Gomez – vihuela
- Douglas Guevara – percussion
- Kiddo – DJ
- Dina Kostic – violin
- Isaias Leckler – Bass
- Juan Cristobal Losada – engineer
- Federico Mendez – guitar
- José Antonio Molina – arranger, string direction
- John Mydrycs – mixing
- Aquiles Priester – percussion
- Joe Reyes – guitar
- Silvio Richetto – vocals, engineer
- Reuben Rodriguez – bass
- Guillermo Sanchez – percussion, guira
- Arturo Sandoval – trumpet
- Tony Seepersad – violin
- SP & JKey – producer
- Dante Vargas – trumpet
- Robert Vilera – percussion
- Orlando Vitto – studio assistant
- Mariusz Wojtowica – violin

== Charts ==
=== Weekly charts ===
Chart (2006)	Peak position
US Billboard 200	68
US Billboard Top Latin Albums	2
US Billboard Latin Pop Albums	1

=== Year-end charts ===
Chart (2006)	Position
US Billboard Top Latin Albums	54
US Billboard Latin Pop Albums	20

Chart (2007)	Position
US Billboard Top Latin Albums	20
US Billboard Latin Pop Albums	10

== Certifications and sales ==
Region	Certification	Certified units/sales
Mexico (AMPROFON)	Gold	50,000^{^}
^{^} Shipments figures based on certification alone.
