= Parece Que Va a Llover =

Single by A.B. Quintanilla y Los Kumbia All Starz

from the album Ayer Fue Kumbia Kings, Hoy Es Kumbia All Starz
- Released: April 6, 2007
- Recorded: 2006
- Genre: Cumbia
- Length: 3:59
- Label: EMI
- Songwriter: Antonio Matas
- Producer: A.B. Quintanilla III

A.B. Quintanilla y Los Kumbia All Starz singles chronology
"Chiquilla" (2006)	"Parece Que Va a Llover" (2007)	"Speedy Gonzales" (2007)

"Parece Que Va a Llover" (English: "It Seems It's Going to Rain") is a charanga song composed by Spanish-Cuban composer Antonio Matas in 1947 (born in 1912 in Palma de Mallorca, he settled in Cuba in 1940). It has been covered by many artists including, Los Panchos, Pedro Infante, Beny More, Joe Quijano and Selena.

It is the second single from the album Ayer Fue Kumbia Kings, Hoy Es Kumbia All Starz by A.B. Quintanilla y Los Kumbia All Starz. "Parece Que Va a Llover" reached #33 on "Latin Regional Mexican Airplay". It was included in the homage album to Pedro Infante.
