= Blanco y Negro (album) =

Studio album by A.B. Quintanilla y Los Kumbia All Starz
- Released: September 17, 2013
- Recorded: 2012–2013
- Genre: Cumbia, Latin pop, country
- Length: 42:37
- Label: Universal Music Latin, Siente Music
- Producer: A.B. Quintanilla; Luigi Giraldo

A.B. Quintanilla y Los Kumbia All Starz chronology
La Vida de un Genio (2010)	Blanco y Negro (2013)	Éxitos en Vivo (2014)

Singles from Blanco y Negro
- 1. "Solo" Released: October 30, 2012; 2. "Blanco y Negro" Released: August 27, 2013

Blanco y Negro (English: Black and White) is the fourth studio album by Mexican-American cumbia group A.B. Quintanilla y Los Kumbia All Starz and the eighth studio album by Mexican-American musician A.B. Quintanilla. It was released on September 17, 2013 by Universal Music Latin and Siente Music. It was originally set to be released on February 12, 2013 by Capitol Latin.

== Track listing ==
No.	Title	Writer(s)	Length
1.	"Ná"	A.B. Quintanilla III, Luigi Giraldo	3:51
2.	"Blanco y Negro"	Quintanilla III, Giraldo, Descemer Bueno	3:34
3.	"Expuesto" (featuring J Balvin)	Quintanilla III, Giraldo	3:10
4.	"Corazón Partío"	Alejandro Sanz	4:12
5.	"Solo"	Quintanilla III, Giraldo	3:42
6.	"Tiburón a la Vista"	Florentino Ruiz Carmona	2:52
7.	"Botella de Veneno"	Quintanilla III, Giraldo, Edgar Barrera	3:10
8.	"Little Mamacita"	Quintanilla III	3:20
9.	"You Are My Everything"	Quintanilla III, D. Elizondo, D. Hicks	3:33
10.	"I Effing Love You"	Quintanilla III	3:59
11.	"Las Preguntas"	Francisco Javier Bautista, Jr.	3:11
12.	"Solo" (ChrisBot Mix)	Quintanilla III, Giraldo	4:03

== Personnel ==
Kumbia All Starz

- A.B. Quintanilla III – bass guitar, backing vocals, composer, producer
- J.R. Gomez – vocals
- Jesús "Isbo" Isbóseth – vocals
- Ramón Vargas – vocals
- Ángel Castillo – vocals
- Nick Banda – keyboards
- Chris "ChrisBot" Domínguez – keyboards
- Saúl Cisneros, Jr. – drums
- Lissenne "Liz" Juárez – congas
- Eloy Vásquez – güira
- Luigi Giraldo – keyboards, composer, producer

== Charts ==
Chart (2013)	Peak position
US Billboard Top Latin Albums	18
US Billboard Latin Pop Albums	4
