= Kumbia All Starz =

American musical group

- Also known as: Kumbia Kings, Kumbia Kings All Starz, Kumbia King All Starz, A.B. Quintanilla's All Starz, Elektro Kumbia
- Origin: Corpus Christi, Texas, United States
- Genres: Cumbia, Latin pop
- Years active: 2006–present
- Labels: EMI Latin, Capitol Latin, Universal Music Latin, DEL
- Members: A.B. Quintanilla; Ramón Vargas; Ángel Castillo; Svani Quintanilla; Nick Banda; Saúl Cisneros Jr. Robby Esparza; Lissenne "Liz" Juárez; Ivan "El Tlacuache" Gomez
- Past members: (see below)
- Website: www.kumbiaallstarz.com

Los Kumbia All Starz are an American musical group from Corpus Christi, Texas, created by A.B. Quintanilla. Kumbia All Starz are not to be confused with Los Kumbia Kings although some members are originally from Los Kumbia Kings. Their 2006 debut album Ayer Fue Kumbia Kings, Hoy Es Kumbia All Starz reached number one on United States Billboard's Latin Pop Albums chart, number one on the Top Latin Albums chart, and number sixty-eight on the United States Billboard 200. The album spawned two charting singles, "Chiquilla" (which reached number seven on Hot Latin Tracks, number nine on Latin Regional Mexican Airplay, number twenty-six on Latin Pop Airplay and number thirty-one on Latin Tropical Airplay) and "Parece Que Va a Llover" single sung by Ricky Rick (which reached the top 10 on Latin Regional Mexican Airplay).

== History ==
=== 2006–2007: Kumbia Kings Controversy and Ayer Fue Kumbia Kings, Hoy Es Kumbia All Starz ===
Many members of Kumbia All Starz, Kingz One and Los Super Reyes were formerly together as Kumbia Kings, which had much success but unfortunately, this was bittersweet for the group amidst the controversy and love/hate relationship between the co-producers of Kumbia Kings, A.B. Quintanilla and Cruz Martínez, as well as the other members and ex-members of the group. A.B. Quintanilla, the founder of Kumbia Kings, left the group and early in the summer of 2006 formed Los Kumbia All Starz.

Cruz Martínez continued with what was left of Los Kumbia Kings until he decided to change the name of the group he now headed to Los Super Reyes. Many of the members of the Kumbia Kings opted to stay with Cruz and released their first album as Los Super Reyes in August 2007. Their first single, titled "Muévelo" has topped Latin radio airwaves in the United States as well as Latin America.

A.B. Quintanilla successfully petitioned Mexican courts to claim the naming rights to "Los Kumbia Kings", though there really was not much opposition, as Cruz Martínez never pursued litigation to retain or share the naming rights with Quintanilla. The name "Los Kumbia Kings" is retired according to Quintanilla, though rumors persist that "Los Kumbia Kings" will resurface at a later date with new band members.

=== 2008–2009: Planeta Kumbia ===
Controversy again erupted on February 1, 2008, when group member Pee Wee publicized his leave from Kumbia All Starz to pursue a solo career.

A press release from A.B. Quintanilla confirmed rumors that Pee Wee had left the Kumbia All Starz, as well as Roque and Memo Morales. According to the letter, the split was amicable and there would be a search for a new member via the group's Myspace page.

The Pee Wee controversy continued in an interview on Univision's Don Francisco Presenta. In the interview, Pee Wee declared that the rumors of pursuing a solo career were invented by the Kumbia All Starz leader, A.B. Quintanilla. He continued stating that during a tour in Mexico, the members did not receive pay for their performances, and that A.B. Quintanilla called him, along with all of Kumbia All Starz's other members, replaceable. Pee Wee also claimed that A.B. Quintanilla's new manager had called his mother to tell her she had 24 hours to leave her home.

On May 12, 2008, Oscar De La Rosa, leader of La Mafia challenged A.B. Quintanilla and his group Los Kumbia All Starz to a battle of the bands. A.B. Quintanilla responded by making a video saying that he accepted and that the battle would be held at Robstown, Texas on August 2, 2008. A press conference was held in San Antonio, Texas on July 30, 2008, where both groups answered questions to the fans. The two stages were set side to side and the rules were each group had to sing 3 songs in a row. The battle began as they tossed a coin to see who would sing first. Oscar called heads and heads it was, so he elected A.B. Quintanilla to go first. For his first 3 songs he chose 3 Tejano songs he wrote and he got his two special guest singers Elida Reyna to sing the first two and Jesse Turner of Siggno to sing the third one. Then La Mafia sang "Estás Tocando Fuego" and two more 90's Billboard hits. For Kumbia All Starz's second turn, their lead singer DJ Kane and Ricky Rick performed the hit single "Shhh!" and two other songs with the dancers from DJ Kane's group when he was a solo singer, John and JD. La Mafia then performed with 3 more songs. Kumbia All Starz sang 3 more songs, then A.B. Quintanilla asked Oscar De La Rosa if they could sing one more song, and Oscar agreed, and so Ricky Rick and Melissa Jiménez got on stage and performed the hit song "Rica y Apretadita". La Mafia then sang 3 of their biggest hits, and after that the crowd was screaming for more, so they sang one more song. At the end of the night La Mafia was declared the winner.

=== 2009–2011: Kumbia Kings Reunion and La Vida de un Genio ===
It was announced by A.B. Quintanilla and Cruz Martínez themselves that the Kumbia Kings would reunite again in an exclusive interview, given on October 26, 2009, through Ventaneando America. The reunion concert was held at Palacio de los Deportes in Mexico City, Mexico on November 21, 2009. The concert started with guest singer Flex who sang songs like "Te Quiero", "Escápate", "Si No Te Tengo", "Dime Si Te Vas Con Él" and "Te Amo Tanto". Then Cruz Martínez & Los Super Reyes sang songs like "Tu Magia", "No Tengo Dinero", "Muchacha Triste", "Sabes a Chocolate", "Na Na Na (Dulce Niña)", "Preso", "Yo Seré", "Todavía", "Quédate Más (I Want You Back)", "Eres" and "Muévelo". Then A.B. Quintanilla & Kumbia All Starz sang songs like "Mami", "Reggae Kumbia", "Dijiste", "Por Ti Baby" with Flex, performed a special tribute to Michael Jackson and Selena Quintanilla, and "Parece Que Va a Llover". For the grand finale A.B. Quintanilla and Cruz Martínez and the rest of the Kumbia Kings got on stage and sang songs like "Pachuco", "Te Quiero a Ti", "Desde Que No Estás Aquí", "Fuiste Mala", "Dime Quién", "Se Fue Mi Amor", "Azúcar", "Boom Boom" and "Shhh!".

=== 2012–2015: Blanco y Negro and Éxitos en Vivo ===
On May 19, 2015, it was announced former members Pee Wee, the former lead singer of the group, as well as the Morales brothers, Roque and Memo, reunited with A.B. Quintanilla and Kumbia All Starz for a series of shows. They clarified they left all differences in the past. They performed a series of reunion concerts, beginning with a concert at Guadalajara on June 26, 2015.

=== 2016–2017: Elektro Kumbia ===
On June 9, 2016, A.B. Quintanilla announced he had signed with DEL Records. It was also announced A.B. Quintanilla would reform and rename Kumbia All Starz to a new band called Elektro Kumbia. During a concert on October 2, 2016, one day away from the 10th anniversary of the band's debut album, A.B. Quintanilla announced it would be the band's last performance as Kumbia All Starz (for that time). Quintanilla renamed and reformed the band to Elektro Kumbia.

The band would change the name back from Elektro Kumbia to Kumbia All Starz in late 2017.

=== 2018–present: Live performances ===
In April 2022, the band performed at Tejano Explosion in San Antonio, Texas, reuniting as a part of the annual Fiesta event held throughout the city.

== Band members ==
Current members

- A.B. Quintanilla – Leader, Bass Guitar, Backing Vocals, Producer (2006–present)
- Ramón Vargas – Vocalist (2012–present)
- Ángel Castillo – Vocalist (2012–2013, 2022–present)
- Svani Quintanilla (aka Principe Q) – Güira, DJ, Backing Vocals (2022–present)
- Nick Banda – Keyboards (2006–present)
- Saúl Cisneros Jr. – Drums (2011–present)
- Robby Esparza – Percussion, Timbales (2008–2009, 2019–present)
- Lissenne "Liz" Juárez – Congas, Backing Vocals (2010–present)
- Ivan "El Tlacuache” Gomez – Lead Vocals (2024–present)
- Aaron Soto - Keyboards (2023-Present)

Former members

- Irvin "Pee Wee" Salinas – Lead Vocalist (2006–2008, 2015)
- Roque Morales Diosdado – Vocalist (2006–2008, 2015)
- Memo Morales Diosdado – Vocalist (2006–2008, 2015)
- Manuel "DJ Kido" Rendon – D.J. (2006–2008)
- Frankie Aranda – Percussion (2008–2009)
- Ricardo "Ricky Rick" Ruiz Pérez – Vocalist (2006–2010, 2019–2023)
- Jason "DJ Kane" Cano – Lead Vocalist (2008–2010)
- Robert "BoBBo" Gomez III – Keyboards (2006–2010)
- Joey Jiménez – Drums (2006–2010)
- Chris Pérez – Guitar (2006–2011)
- Jesús "Isbo" Isbóseth – Vocalist (2013–2014)
- J.R. Gomez – Vocalist (2009–2016)
- Eloy Vásquez – Guiro (2012–2017)
- Alfonso Ramirez – Vocalist (2015–2017)
- Zuriel Ramirez – Vocalist (2015–2017)
- Luigi Giraldo – Keyboards, Producer (2006–2018)
- "El Animal" Noe "Gipper" Nieto, Jr. – Accordion (2006–2010, 2016–2021) (deceased: September 11, 2021)
- Ricky Valenz – Vocalist (2018–2021)
- Chris Domínguez – Keyboards (2010–2021)

Touring members

- Melissa Jiménez – Vocalist, Dancer (2008)
- T López – Vocalist, Dancer (2010–2011)

== Discography ==
- Ayer Fue Kumbia Kings, Hoy Es Kumbia All Starz (2006)
- Planeta Kumbia (2008)
- La Vida de un Genio (2010)
- Blanco y Negro (2013)
- Éxitos en Vivo (2014)
- Elektro Kumbia (2017)
