= T Lopez =

American singer-songwriter (born 1981)

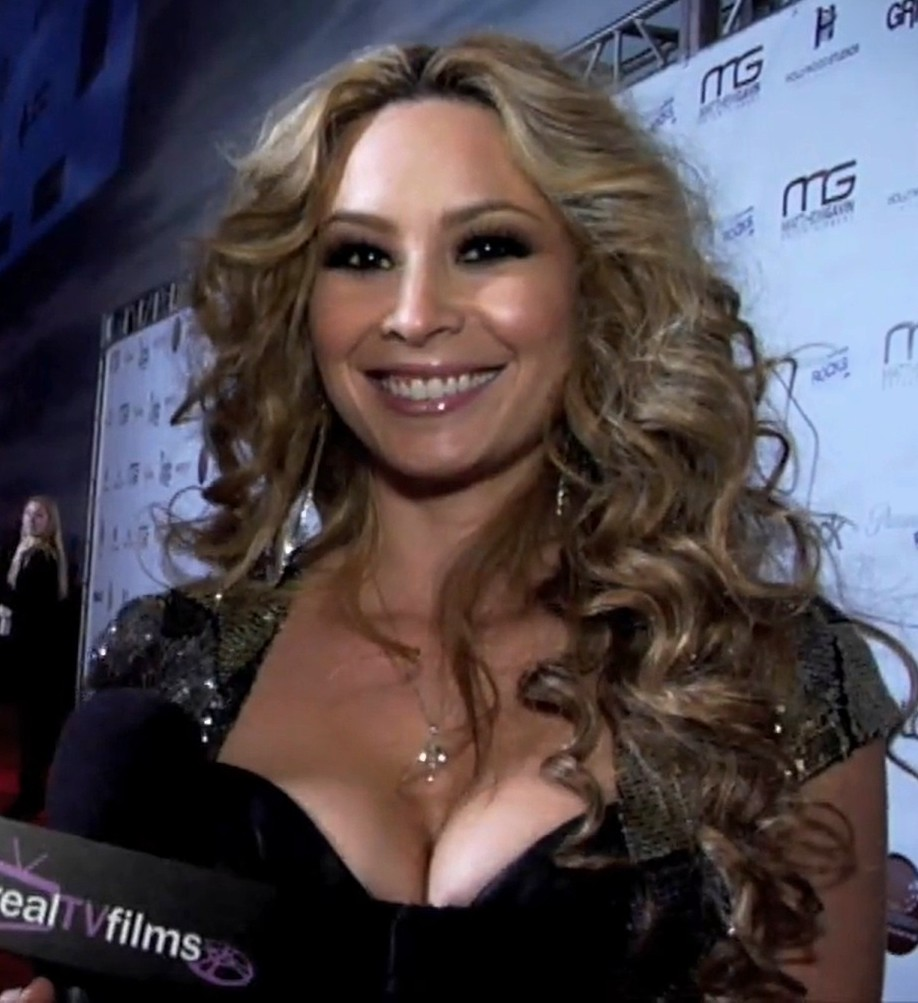
- Lopez in 2010

Background information
- Born: Christina T. Lopez; April 18, 1981 (age 45); Ontario, California, U.S.
- Genres: Pop; pop rock; electronic; dance; electropop
- Occupations: Inspirational speaker; recording artist; television host; producer; writer; singer
- Instrument: Vocals
- Years active: 2001–present
- Labels: Cash Money; Universal Republic

Christina T. Lopez (born April 18, 1981), known professionally as T Lopez, is an American singer, speaker, TV host, producer, and writer from Ontario, California. T Lopez was a former member of the Latina group Soluna. As a solo artist, T Lopez signed a record label deal with Cash Money Records and Universal Republic Records.

== Career ==
=== Media appearances and film acting ===
Along with her Latina group Soluna they have won Mexico's Heraldo award for Best New Pop Artist's in 2002, and appeared on national television shows such as The Late Late Show with Craig Kilborn, Sabado Gigante, Despierta America, and Hoy. A television pilot was developed for the group under the production of Suzanne de Passe, in affiliation with Paramount Studios, the UPN network and Gramnet. The role of Josie written especially for T Lopez.

T Lopez also has served as a host of the Sí TV television program The Drop, which highlights Latino culture in music and movies. She has guest starred in The Suite Life of Zack & Cody as Brandi Tipton, as well as CSI: Crime Scene Investigation, Charmed, Ghost Whisperer, Days of our Lives, The Brothers Garcia, Terriers, and South Of Nowhere. She has starred in independent films such as April Fools, 21 & A Wake Up, Hollywood Kills, and the mockumentary The Boys & Girls Guide to Getting Down.

== Filmography ==
Film
Year	Film	Role	Notes
2006	The Boys & Girls Guide to Getting Down	Power women	
Television
Year	Title	Role	Notes
2003	The Brothers Garcia	Herself	
2004	The Soluna Project	Josie	
2005	South of Nowhere	Hot girl	
2006	CSI: Crime Scene Investigation	Joslynn Raines	
2006	The Suite Life of Zack & Cody	Brandi Tipton	
2006	Hollywood Kills	Kristin	
2006	Charmed	Allison	
2007	Ghost Whisperer	Thea	
