= José Luis Paredes Pacho =

Mexican musician, researcher, writer and cultural advocate

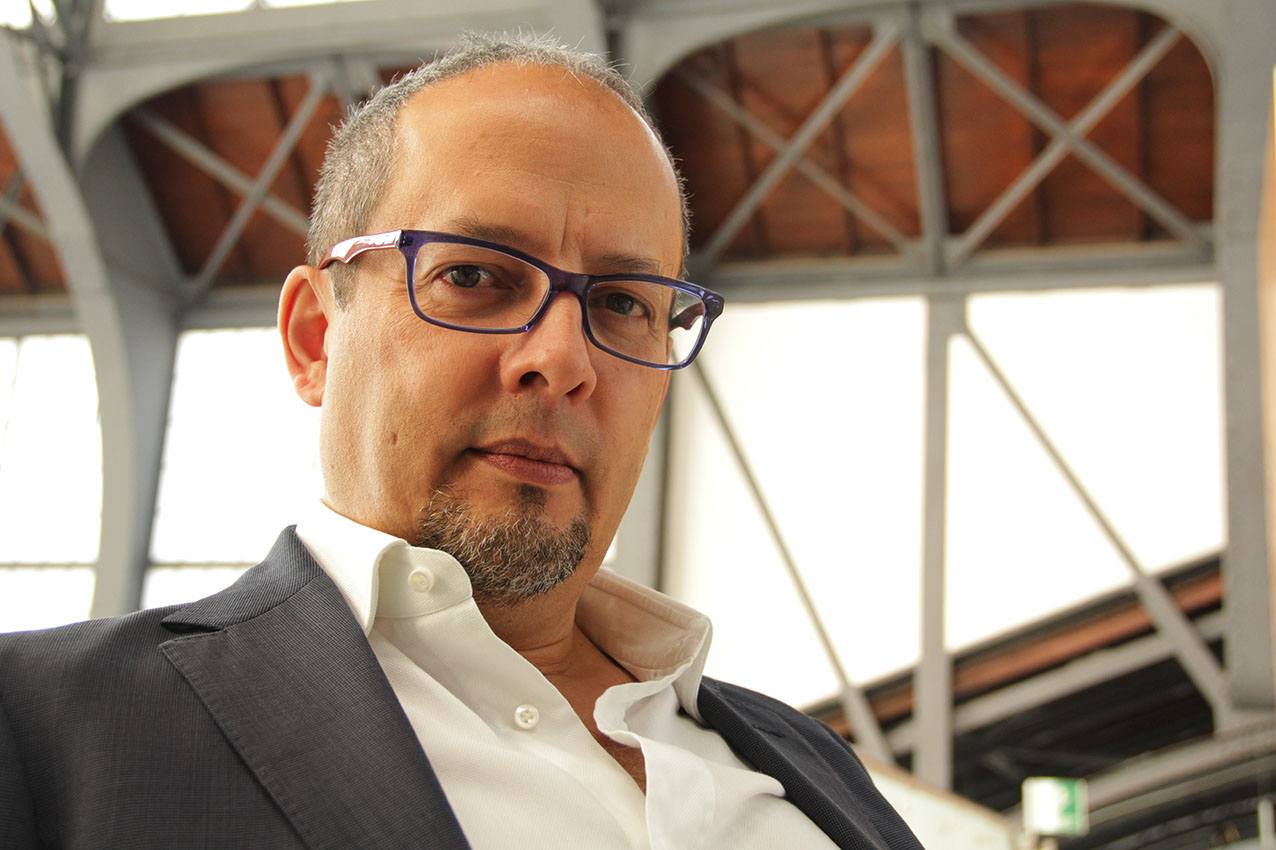
- Born: March 17, 1961 (age 65); Mexico City, Mexico
- Occupations: Musician, writer, researcher, public servant
- Writing career
- Language: Spanish, English
- Notable works: Rock Mexicano. Sonidos de la calle (1992, as author); El Circo (1991, as musician)

José Luis Paredes Pacho (Mexico City, March 17, 1961) is a Mexican musician, researcher, writer and cultural advocate. He is the founder of the new cycle of Poesía en voz alta Mexican poetry festival, Radical Mestizo's Festival de Mexico music program and founder member of Maldita Vecindad y los Hijos del Quinto Patio where he was drummer during 18 years. He is one of the researchers about Rock music in Mexico and counterculture movements in the country.

From 2012 Paredes is the director of Museo Universitario del Chopo.

== Biography ==
In 1971 Paredes acted in the film as Pablito in "The Wrath of God" (MGM), directed by Ralph Nelson and starring Robert Mitchum and Rita Hayworth. In 1985 he acted in "Manuscript found in Zaragoza" a piece with script of Juan Tovar based on the novel of Jan Potocki and directed by Ludwig Margules.

From 1972 was drummer of Coyote band, from 1984 to 1985 of Orificio and from 1981 to 1984, drummer in the School of Dance CESUCO. From 1986 to 2000 Paredes Pacho was drummer of famous Mexican band Maldita Vecindad, pioneers of the creation of a Spanish-language rock scene in the United States with whom he toured several countries in Europe, the United States and Latin America. Maldita Vecindad's work was covered extensively by media such as The Village Voice, LA Weekly, Spin, among others.

In 1999 Paredes was content advisor of the 2000 year celebrations in Mexico From the 20th century to the third millennium of CONACULTA. He programmed the then-emerging Tijuana musical group Nortec Collective to musicalize with their piece "Polaris" Rafael Lozano-Hemmer's Alzado Vectorial and Lidia Romero piece in the Zócalo of the Mexican capital. It was the first time that Nortec, now multi-award-winning and well known as Mexican band, was scheduled for a national event, such as celebrations for the arrival of 2000.

In 2001 Paredes created Radical Mestizo section of Festival de México, one of the most important non-profit cultural festivals in Mexico, with 39 years of existence. Radical Mestizo has presented since 2001 ethnic, traditional, world beat, diaspora and electronic music proposals curated by Paredes. Some of those invited to the festival, and what in some cases made their first appearances in Mexico was in Radical Mestizo cycle are Ojos de Brujo, Diego el Cigala, Sidestepper, Mouss et Hakim, Chano Domínguez, Goran Bregovic, Bomba Stereo, La 33, Nortec and Seun Kuti, among others. The program includes workshops and panels by invited artists and other international specialists, for example the collaboration between the Spanish flamenco artist Diego el Cigala and the Son jarocho band, Chuchumbé. Also Radical Mestizo opening concert in 2002 was played by Ojos de Brujo, Dusminguet, Sargento García, Amparanoia y Maldita Vecindad y los Hijos del Quinto Patio and was the penultimate presentation of Spanish band Dusminguet. The concert brought together 80 000 people.

From September 2002 to February 2013, Paredes Pacho was an advisory member of the Consejo de Fomento y Desarrollo Cultural del Distrito Federal (Mexico City Cultural Development and Development Council) of the Secretary of Culture of the Mexico City Government, a multistakeholder consultation body with universities, cultural institutions and cultural sector notables to develop the Mexico City cultural strategy for the next years. In June 2003 he collaborated Festival Instrumenta, directed by Ignacio Toscano devoted to the development of Music of Oaxaca – especially youth musicians. Among the activities done that year, a workshop was held where the Balanic group of Goran Bregovic participated along with a traditional band of indigenous Oaxacan music.

From March 2005 to May 2012, José Luis Paredes Pacho was director of Casa del Lago Juan José Arreola, a branch of the Cultural Coordination of the UNAM. Since May 2012 he is director of the Museo Universitario del Chopo.

== Discography ==
=== With Maldita Vecindad ===
- Maldita Vecindad y los Hijos del 5º Patio, BMG, 1988.
- El Circo, BMG, 1991.
- Gira Pata de Perro, BMG, 1994
- Baile de Máscaras, BMG, 1995
- Mostros, BMG, 1998
- Maldita Sea, Greatest Hits, (USA, 2000)

==== Compilations ====
- Tributo a José José (BMG, 1999) with "Ya lo pasado pasado".
- Armando Manzanero y Sus Amigos with "Esta tarde vi llover" (1993).
- El más Grande Homenaje a Los Tigres del Norte with "El Circo" (2001).
- Juntos por Chiapas with the song "La tormenta" (Supporting Ejército Zapatista de Liberación Nacional) (PolyGram).

==== Soundtracks ====
- Piedras verdes, 2001.

== Publications ==
=== Books ===
- Rock Mexicano. Sonidos de la calle (Rock of Mexico, sounds of the street, 1992), with a foreword by Carlos Monsiváis.

=== Articles ===
- "Los nuevos bárbaros, oralidad y nuevas tecnologías (The new barbarians, orality and new technologies)" in García Canclini, Nestor (editor). La creatividad redistribuida. México, Siglo XXI Editores, 2013.
- "Rock mexicano, breve recuento del siglo XX (Rock of Mexico, short recount of the 20th century)" in Tello, Aurelio (coordinator). La música en México. México, Biblioteca Mexicana, Fondo de Cultura Económica / CONACULTA, 2010.
- "Un país invisible. Escenarios independientes: autogestión, colectivos, cooperativas, microempresas y cultura alternativa (An invisible country. Independent scenarios: self-management, collectives, cooperatives, microenterprises and alternative culture" in Woldenberg, José y Florescano, Enrique (editors). Cultura mexicana: revisión y retrospectiva. México, Taurus, 2008.
- “Industrias culturales, culturas emergentes y subculturas (Cultural industries, emerging cultures and subcultures)”, en Robles, Mara, Rodríguez Banda, Alfredo (compilators). Políticas culturales en México, hacia un plan estratégico de desarrollo cultural. México, Universidad de Guadalajara, Centro de Estudios Estratégicos para el Desarrollo, Guadalajara, Jalisco. 2006.
- "El Zócalo y el siglo (Zocalo and the century)" en Lozano-Hemmer, Rafael. Alzado Vectorial. México, CONACULTA, 2000.

=== Prologues ===
- Oye cómo va: recuento del rock tijuanense (CONACULTA-CECUT, SEP, Instituto Mexicano de la Juventud. México, 1999)
- Paso del Nortec, (editorial Trilce, México 2004).

=== Media ===
- Member of the editorial board of the Periódico de Poesía, published by Literature Studies Division of the Cultural Diffusion Coordination, UNAM.
- Member of the Programming Council of Radio UNAM (2005–2007)
- Member of the editorial board of the biweekly magazine DF Por Travesías.
- Host of "Ruidos de la Calle radio program at Reforma newspaper website (2003)
- Author at bilingual music magazine La Banda Elástica, published in Los Ängeles, California (2000)
- Editorial consultant of Reforma's Gente section (1997).
