= Gundolf =

Gundolf is both a German masculine given name and a surname. Notable people with the name include:

== Given name ==
- Gundolf Ernst (1930–2002), German geologist and mineralogist
- Gundolf S. Freyermuth (born 1955), German-American professor for media studies and author
- Gundolf Köhler (1959–1980), German far-right terrorist and mass murderer
- Gundolf Thoma (born 1965), German former ski racer and ski demonstrator in Japan

== Surname ==
- Cordelia Gundolf (1917–2008), German-born Italian language educator in Australia, daughter of Friedrich Gundolf
- Friedrich Gundolf (1880–1931), German literary scholar and poet
- Hubert Gundolf (born 1952), Austrian speed skater

== See also ==
- Friedrich-Gundolf-Preis, a German literary prize, named after Friedrich Gundolf
- Gandolf
