= Friedrich Gundolf =

German-Jewish literary scholar and poet

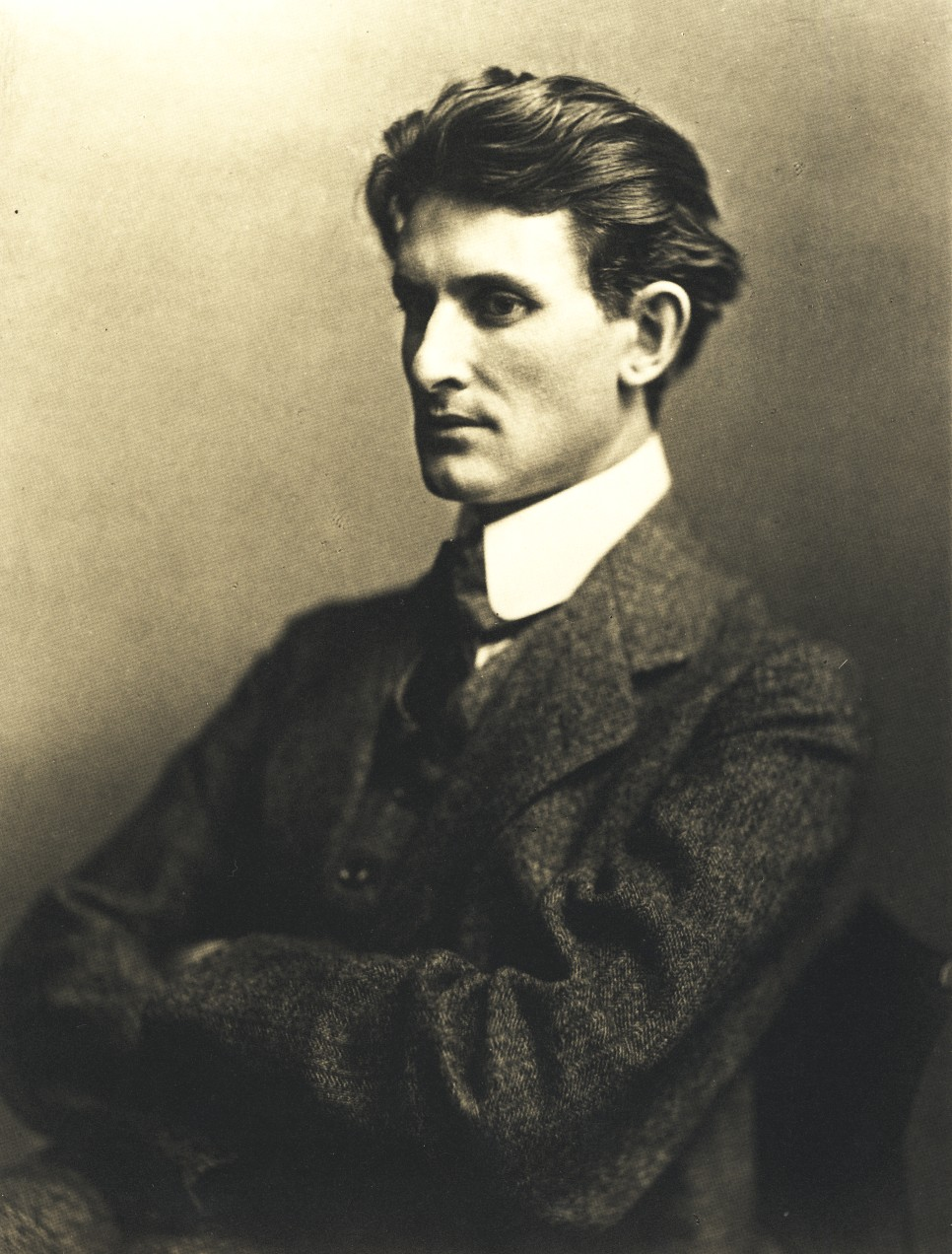
Friedrich Gundolf; photograph by Jacob Hilsdorf

Friedrich Gundolf (born Friedrich Leopold Gundelfinger; 20 June 1880, Darmstadt – 12 July 1931, Heidelberg) was a German-Jewish literary scholar and poet and one of the best known academics of the Weimar Republic.

== Early life and career ==
Gundolf, who was the son of a mathematician, studied art history and German language and literature at the universities of Munich, Berlin and Heidelberg. He received his doctorate in 1903 and completed his Habilitation (attainment of professor's status) eight years later. His habilitation work about "Shakespeare and the German spirit" (Shakespeare und der deutsche Geist, 1911), marked a turning point in German language and literature studies.

He also was an important member of the George-Kreis, which he joined in 1899. Stefan George and Gundolf had a platonic love affair that lasted several years. Gundolf published first poems in George's periodical, the Blätter für die Kunst. During 1910 and 1911, he edited the Jahrbuch für die geistige Bewegung (Yearbook for the Spiritual Movement), which preached the cultural political opinions of the Georgekreis. Gundolf and Stefan George stayed on good terms for more than twenty years, but later, George broke completely with him, on the occasion of Gundolf's marriage in 1926.

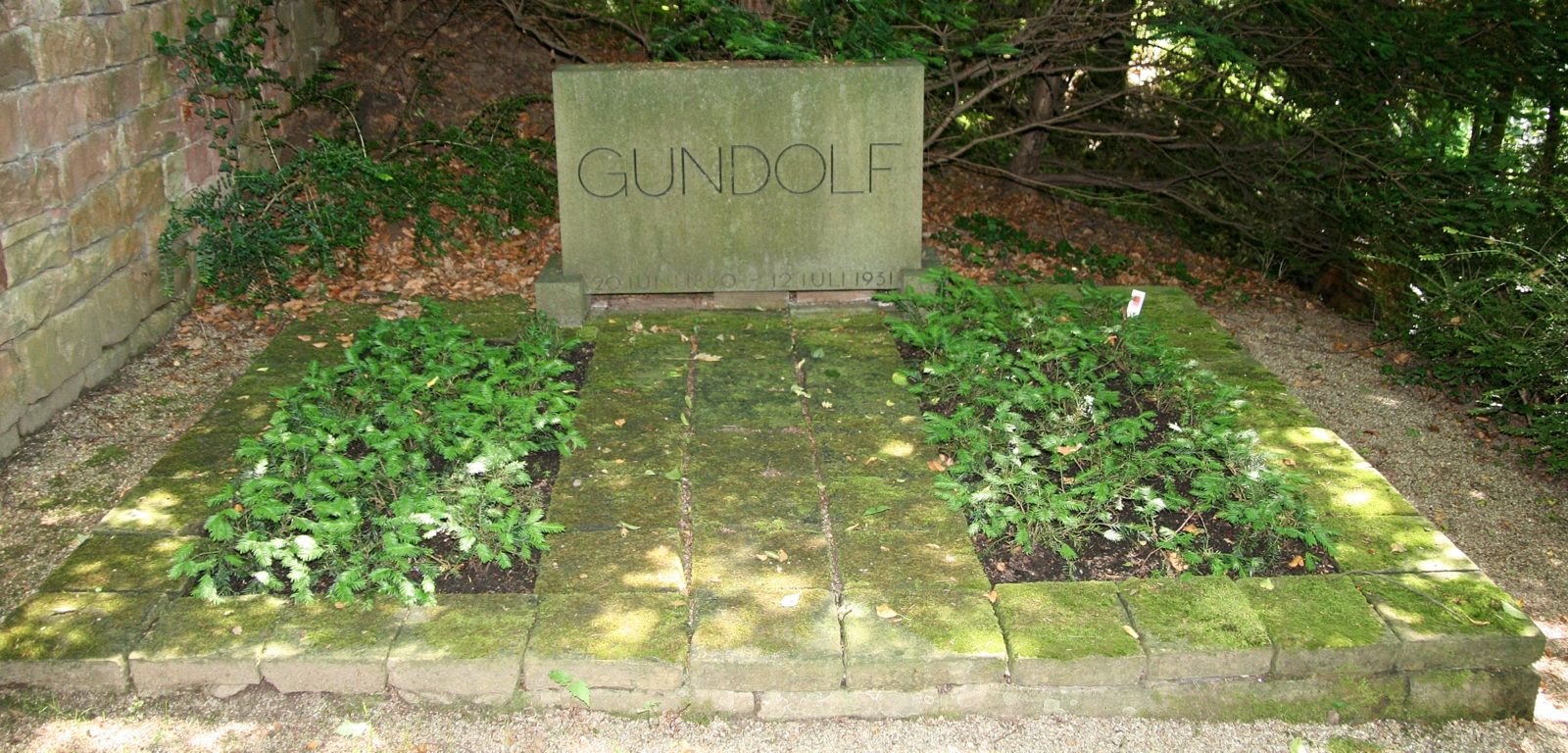
His grave in Heidelberg

In his works in literary studies, Gundolf took a new, historically-oriented view on literature, which centered on the philosophically determined registration of the poet. To him, the great writers (such as Shakespeare and Goethe) were symbolic figures of their time, and in his academic research he sought to present not only the artists themselves, but also the effects of their works.

From 1916 to the late 1920s, Friedrich Gundolf was professor at Heidelberg University. In 1921, one of his students was Joseph Goebbels, later the Nazi propaganda minister, who at that time admired Gundolf and his colleague Max Freiherr von Waldberg. Von Waldberg subsequently became Goebbels's advisor when he wrote his doctoral dissertation. Gundolf also befriended the economist and fellow Heidelberg professor Arthur Salz. Another one of his students in 1929 was Johannes Hoffmeister who would later become a philosopher.

== Death and legacy ==
In 1927, Gundolf was diagnosed with cancer, and died of it four years later. Gundolf's works were banned by the Nazi regime in 1933. He was married to Agathe Mallachow (1884–1983) who was a pianist. Their daughter Cordelia Gundolf became an Italian language professor and expert in literature. She was the godchild of graphic artist Melchior Lechter. After the death of her father and as the Nazi regime assumed power in Germany, her mother asked Albert Einstein for advice. This led the family to escape to Capri and subsequently to Rome.

== Works ==
His best known publication is Goethe (1916) (13th edition in 1930), in which he radicalized the principles of his view on figures. In 1964 the Deutsche Akademie für Sprache und Dichtung founded the annual Friedrich-Gundolf-Preis for the inter-mediation of German culture in foreign countries.
