= Zollern =

Zollern may refer to:

- House of Hohenzollern, a German former royal dynasty
  - Beatrix of Zollern (1362–1414), wife of Duke Albert III of Austria
  - Count of Zollern, including a list of people with the title
- County of Zollern, a medieval county of in South West Germany
- Zollern II/IV Colliery, a disused mine in the city of Dortmund

== See also ==
- Zollernalbkreis, a district in Baden-Württemberg, Germany
