= Nereida Garcia Ferraz =

Cuban artist

Nereida Garcia-Ferraz (born 1954) is a Cuban-American multi-disciplinary artist. She is known for her works on feminist art movement and self identity.

== Early life ==
Garcia-Ferraz was born in Cuba, in 1954, to a Catholic mother and atheist father. She emigrated to the United States in 1970 and graduated from the Art Institute of Chicago in 1981,

== Artistic and Academic Practice ==
Garcia-Ferraz practice includes painting, photography, sculpture and installations to present works inspired by memory, Cuba and feminism.

In 1988 she coproduced and directed the documentary, Ana Mendieta: Fuego de Tierra, after Ana Mendieta's death in 1985. The film was awarded Best Video Documentary, National Latino Film and Video Festival.

She is featured in the book: "Democracy and Time in Cuban Thought: The Elusive Present". The book cover is a drawing from her series Havana/Miami, described as a "paint of herself standing on a stack of books, looking at a solitary star similar to the one found on the Cuban flag. Yet in the piece the solitary star is a gaping hole, an empty promise of hope"

In 2026 she received an Individual Support Grant from the Adolph and Esther Gottlieb_Foundation In 2024 García-Ferraz was awarded the CINTAS Fellowship in Visual Arts In August 2022 she received the South Florida Cultural Consortium Visual and Media Artists Fellowship from the SFCC In 2000 she was awarded with The Richard Diebenkorn Teaching Fellowship for the San Francisco Art Institute. In her early career Garcia-Ferraz received two National Endowment for the Arts in 1986 and 1989, She was a recipient of the Visual Arts Fellowship from the Illinois Council in 1985, 1986 and 1989.

As an teaching artist, Garcia-Ferraz has contributed to Art education in programs such as Brick by Brick and The Vitality Program at PAMM.

== Exhibitions ==
She has exhibited at the University of Catania in Sicily (1989), the Smithsonian International Gallery (1997), and the Museo Universitario del Chopo in Mexico City, Chicago Art 1945-1995. Museum of Contemporary Art. Chicago in1995

In 2022 was featured in Radical Conventions- Cuban Art in America the 80’s at the Lowe Museum Miami. University of Miami

In 2023 she was featured in the South Florida Cultural Consortium (SFCC) 2023 as part of South Florida Cultural Consortium Grant.

In 2024 she was part of the exhibition "Mirror of the Mind: Figuration in the Jorge M. Pérez Collection" at El Espacio 23, a narrative-rich painting featured in the exhibition reflects who she is

In 2023 García-Ferraz had her first solo exhibition in Miami "De Noche Los Sueños" at Spinello Project. Her "work has always deconstructed who she is, where she is from, and the energies and elements of what connects all three: love, history, spirituality, and memory".

In 2004, exhibiting in Miami, Garcia Ferraz received recognition in the Miami New Times for presenting depictions of "her personal myth in symbolically nuanced fragments and echos of her childhood in Cuba" providing a "thought-provoking glimpse of the art of thinking in imagery".

Considered to be one of today's most significant Cuban-American artists, she staged "Marcando el tiempo", her first exhibition in Cuba at the Casa de las Américas in December 2017.

== Sources ==
- Conner, Randy P.; Sparks, David Hatfield (2004). Queering Creole Spiritual Traditions: Lesbian, Gay, Bisexual, and Transgender Participation in African-inspired Traditions in the Americas. Psychology Press. ISBN 978-1-56023-351-0.
- Pardo, Stein; C., Lara (2013). Artists, Aesthetics, and Migrations: Contemporary Visual Arts and Caribbean Diaspora in Miami, Florida. Deep Blue Repositories (Thesis). hdl:2027.42/100080.
