= Pachuco (song) =

1991 song by La Maldita Vecindad

Single by La Maldita Vecindad

from the album El Circo
- Released: 1991
- Genre: Rock en español, ska
- Length: 3:14
- Label: BMG
- Songwriter(s): Lobito, Sax, Aldo, Pacho, Roco, Tiki

"Pachuco" is a song by Mexican rock band La Maldita Vecindad. It was released in 1991 on their second studio album El Circo (1991).

== Kumbia Kings version ==
"Pachuco"

Single by A.B. Quintanilla y Los Kumbia Kings

from the album Kumbia Kings Live
- Released: March 1, 2006
- Recorded: 2006
- Genre: Cumbia
- Length: 3:45
- Label: EMI Latin
- Songwriter(s): Lobito, Sax, Aldo, Pacho, Roco, Tiki
- Producer(s): A.B. Quintanilla III, Cruz Martínez

A.B. Quintanilla y Los Kumbia Kings singles chronology
"Parte de Mi Corazón" (2005)	"Pachuco" (2006)

"Pachuco" is a song by Mexican-American cumbia group A.B. Quintanilla y Los Kumbia Kings. It was released as a single for their live album Kumbia Kings Live (2006) on March 1, 2006. The song is a studio recording and not a live track. "Pachuco" is the final single by Kumbia Kings before their breakup in 2006.

=== Personnel ===
- Written by Lobito, Sax, Aldo, Pacho, Roco, and Tiki
- Produced by A.B. Quintanilla and Cruz Martínez
- Lead vocals by Fernando "Nando" Domínguez
- Intro by A.B. Quintanilla
- Guitar by Chris Pérez

=== Charts ===
Chart (2006)	Peak position
US Billboard Regional Mexican Songs	28
