= El circo (album) =

Studio album by Maldita Vecindad
- Released: 24 September 1991
- Genre: Rock en español, Ska
- Label: BMG Mexico

Maldita Vecindad chronology
Maldita Vecindad (1989)	El circo (1991)	En vivo (1993)

Professional ratings
Review scores
Source	Rating
Allmusic	link

El circo is an album recorded by Mexican rock band Maldita Vecindad. The album was released on 24 September 1991 under the BMG Entertainment Mexico label.

== Track listing ==
All tracks by Maldita Vecindad

1. "Pachuco" – 3:14
2. "Un poco de sangre" – 4:00
3. "Toño" – 3:30
4. "Solín" – 3:11
5. "Kumbala" – 4:27
6. "Un gran circo" – 4:11
7. "Pata de perro" – 3:29
8. "Crudelia" – 2:42
9. "Mare" – 3:38
10. "Otra" – 0:17
11. "Querida" – 3:29

== Personnel ==
- Roco – vocals
- Aldo – bass
- Pato – guitar
- Pacho – drums
- Sax – saxophones & guitar
- Lobito – percussion
