= Theodor Hilsdorf =

German photographer (1868–1944)

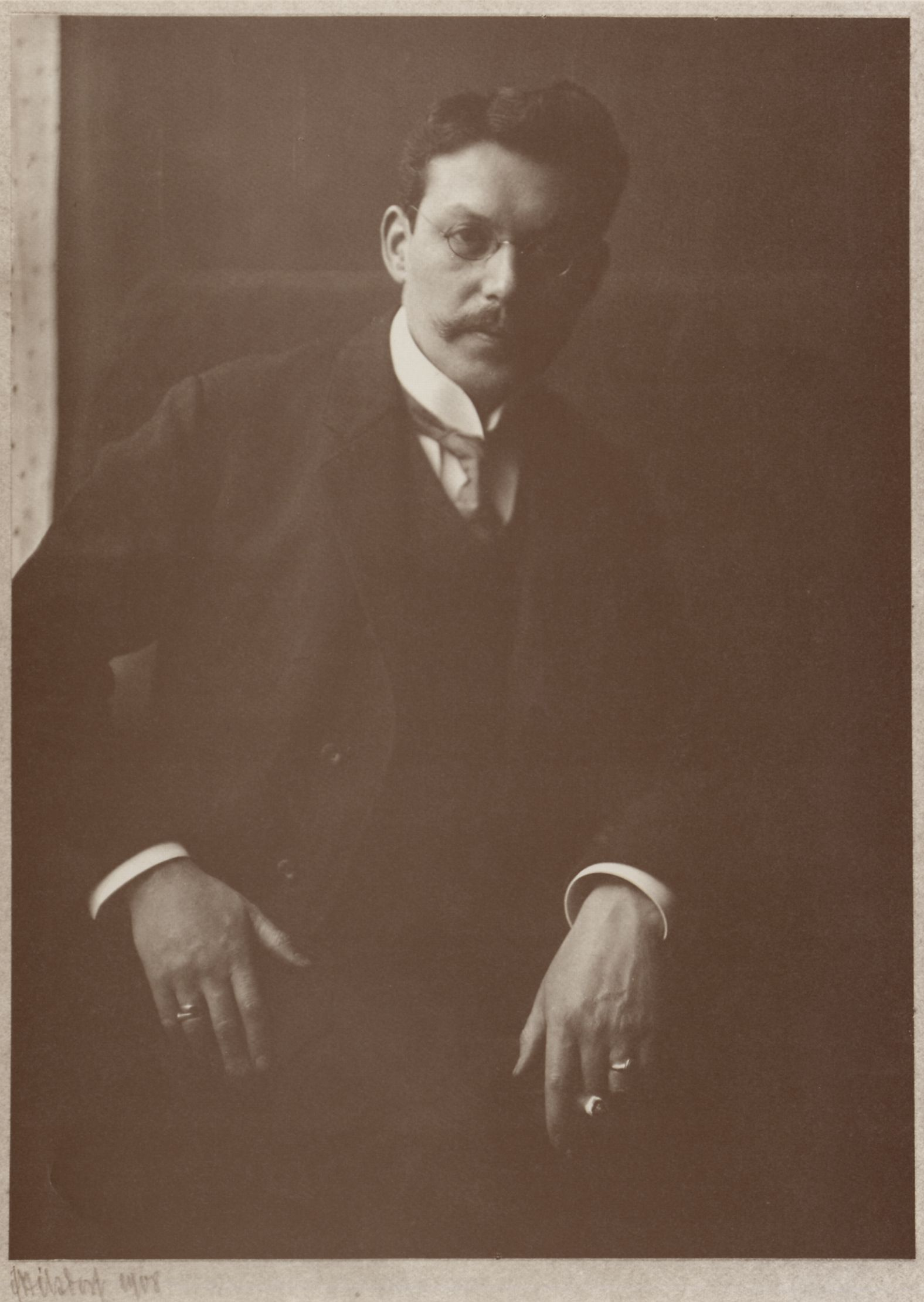
Theodor Hilsdorf; photograph by Jacob Hilsdorf (1908)

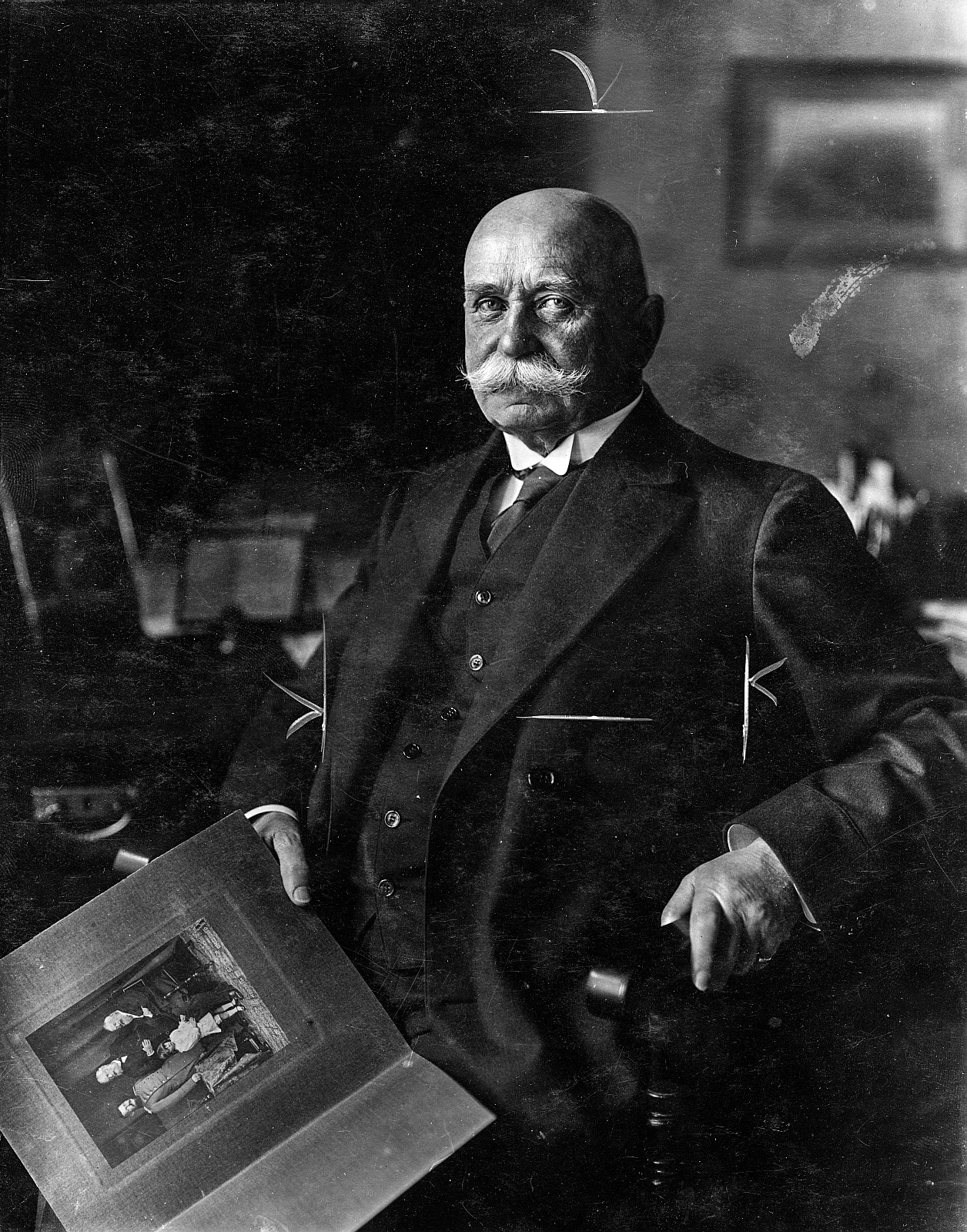
Hilsdorf's portrait of Von Zeppelin (1915)

Theodor Hilsdorf (18 June 1868, Bingen – 1944, Munich) was a German photographer who held an official position at the Royal Bavarian Court.

== Life and work ==
His father, Johann Baptist Hilsdorf, was also a photographer. He and his younger brother, Jacob, who would also become a photographer, took their first lessons in his studio. They also studied drawing with an artist in Mainz. After completing his training, he made the acquaintance of Friedrich Müller. In 1891, he joined Müller's studio in Munich and soon became his business partner. He specialized in large format sepia-toned portraits, which he presented at exhibitions.

In 1893, he became engaged to Müller's daughter, Emilie. They were married in 1894, after he had spent a year in the United States, and had several children, including Johanna (1900–1997) and Carola (1903–1983), who were employed at the Deutsche Werkstätten Hellerau.

Following Müller's death in 1903, Hilsdorf took over the studio but retained his step-father's name, calling it the Friedrich Müller-Hilsdorf studio. In 1905, he was appointed "Royal Bavarian Court Photographer" by Prince Regent Luitpold.

He did not, however, limit himself to photographing the Royal Family; he also did portraits of faculty from the Academy of Fine Arts, theatre actors, and opera singers. His portraits of Stefan George, Richard Strauss and Ferdinand Graf von Zeppelin became part of the standard publishing repertoire until the 1930s.

In 1945, during World War II, his studio was destroyed, resulting in the loss of over 100,000 negatives. Fewer than 2,000 photographic plates have survived and are currently held by the Munich Stadtmuseum. His work was largely forgotten until 1978, when an exhibition of his brother Jacob's work was held in Bingen. This stimulated interest and an exhibition of his work followed in 1983.

== Sources ==
- Berthold Roland (Ed.): Theodor Hilsdorf 1868–1944. Königlich-Bayerischer Hofphotograph, Landesmuseum Mainz, 1987
- Berthold Roland (Ed.): Nicola Perscheid, Theodor und Jacob Hilsdorf, August Sander. Der rheinland-pfälzische Beitrag zur Geschichte der Photographie, exhibition catalog, Landesmuseum, 1989
- Hans-Michael Koetzle, Ulrich Pohlmann (Eds.): Münchner Kreise: Der Fotograf Theodor Hilsdorf (1868–1944). Kerber, Bielefeld 2007, ISBN 3-86678-051-6
- (in German) Philipp Freytag: Hilsdorf, Theodor. In: Allgemeines Künstlerlexikon. Die Bildenden Künstler aller Zeiten und Völker (AKL). Band 73, de Gruyter, Berlin 2011, ISBN 978-3-11-023178-6, S. 249
