= Maldita Sea, Vol. 1: 1989–1999 =

Greatest hits album by Maldita Vecindad
- Released: July 11, 2000
- Recorded: 1989–1999
- Genre: Rock en español, ska
- Label: BMG International

Maldita Vecindad chronology
Mostros (1998)	Maldita Sea, Vol. 1: 1989–1999 (2000)

Professional ratings
Review scores
Source	Rating
Allmusic	link

Maldita Sea, Vol. 1: 1989–1999 is a greatest hits album released by Maldita Vecindad y los Hijos del Quinto Patio. The best songs from their previous five albums are included on this compilation, as well as one track from a tribute album to José José.

== Track listing ==
=== Disc 1 ===
1. Morenaza
2. Rafael
3. Supermercado
4. Mujer
5. Toño
6. Kumbala
7. Pachuco
8. Solin (Live)
9. Pata De Perro (Live)
10. Un Poco De Sangre (Live)
11. Mojado (Live)

=== Disc 2 ===
1. Don Palabras
2. Ojos Negros
3. El Dedo
4. El Chulo
5. La Tormenta
6. El Cocodrilo
7. El Tieso Y La Negra Soledad
8. El Barzon
9. Patineto
10. Lo Pasado Pasado
11. Sirena
12. Kumbala (Remix)
