= En Vivo: Gira Pata de Perro =

Live album by Maldita Vecindad
- Released: February 1, 1994
- Recorded: September 24, 1993
- Venue: Auditorio Nacional, Mexico City, Mexico
- Genre: Rock en español, ska
- Length: 32:06
- Label: BMG Mexico
- Producer: Tom Werman

Maldita Vecindad chronology
Maldita Vecindad (1989)	En Vivo: Gira Pata de Perro (1994)	Baile de Máscaras (1996)

En Vivo: Gira Pata de Perro is a live album released by Mexican rock band Maldita Vecindad y los Hijos del Quinto Patio. Their third album was released on February 1, 1993 under the BMG label.

== Track listing ==
1. Solín - 6:10
2. Pata de Perro - 4:15
3. Un Gran Circo - 4:29
4. Un Poco de Sangre - 5:23
5. Pachuco - 6:05
6. Mojado - 5:44

== Personnel ==
- Roco - vocals
- Aldo - guitars
- Pato - bass
- Pacho - drums
- Sax - saxophones
- Lobito - percussion
