= Cordelia Gundolf =

Author and translator (1917–2008)

Cordelia Gundolf (30 November 1917 – 10 September 2008) was a German-born Italian language educator in Australia, and an expert in Italian literature, publishing a number of works on the topic.

== Early life ==
Born in Munich, Germany on 31 November 1917, Gundolf came from a famous literary family, being the daughter of Friedrich Gundolf and godchild of Melchior Lechter, a noted graphic artist. She originally worked in Rome as a translator. Gundolf's grandfather was Jewish; her mother was concerned this would make problems for the family following Adolf Hitler's accession to power in Germany, so she asked Albert Einstein, a family friend for advice. Following his advice, they fled to Capri, and then to Rome. Her first work, Myrtles and Mice: Leaves from the Italian Diary of Cordelia Gundolf was published in 1935.

== Career ==
Gundolf worked as a translator before applying for the position of Italian language lecturer at the University of Melbourne in 1960. This was the start of teaching at University of Melbourne, and some of the first teaching of Italian in Australia. Upon the death of the previous department head, she became the head of the Italian Language Department. She continued to teach and also publish work on the Italian language, but developed, as her principal interest, an expert knowledge of Italian literature. She published widely in this area.

Gundolf died of liver cancer on 10 September 2008 in Benalla, Victoria.
