= Mostros =

Studio album by Maldita Vecindad
- Released: September 15, 1998
- Genre: Rock en español; ska
- Label: BMG International

Maldita Vecindad chronology
| Baile de Máscaras (1996) | Mostros (1998) | Maldita Sea (2000) |

Professional ratings
Review scores
| Source | Rating |
|---|---|
| Allmusic | link |

Mostros is the fifth and last studio album recorded by Mexican rock band Maldita Vecindad y los Hijos del Quinto Patio. The LP was released on September 15, 1998 under the BMG label.

== Track listing ==
1. El Malasuerte
2. Patineto
3. El Cocodrilo
4. El Teporocho
5. Camaleón
6. El Barzón
7. Caer
8. El Tieso y la Negra Soledad
9. 2 de Octubre
10. Tatuaje
11. Mostros
12. Sirena (hidden track)

== Personnel ==
- Roco - vocals
- Aldo - guitars
- Pato - bass
- Pacho - drums
- Sax - saxophones
