= Melchior Lechter =

German painter (1865–1937)

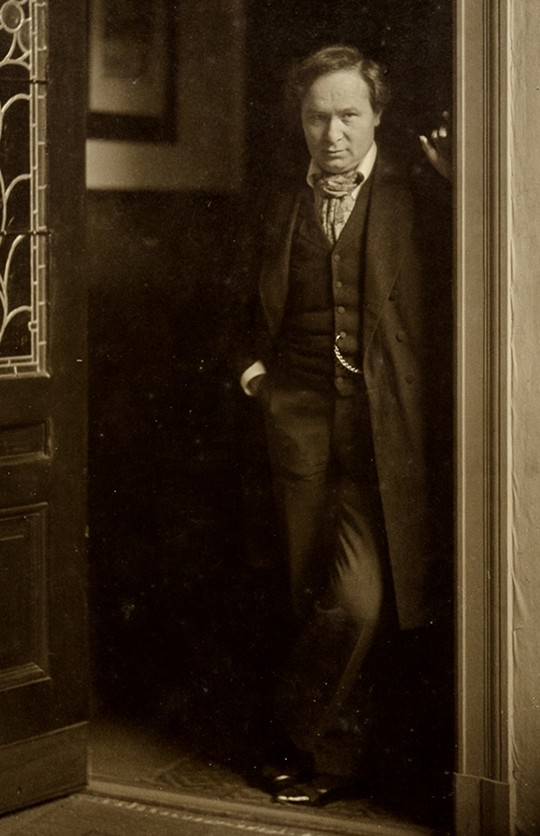
Melchior Lechter, photograph by Jacob Hilsdorf (1903), The Jack Daulton Collection, Los Altos Hills, California.

Melchior Lechter (2 October 1865, Münster – 8 October 1937, Raron) was a German painter, graphic artist, and book designer.

== Life and work ==
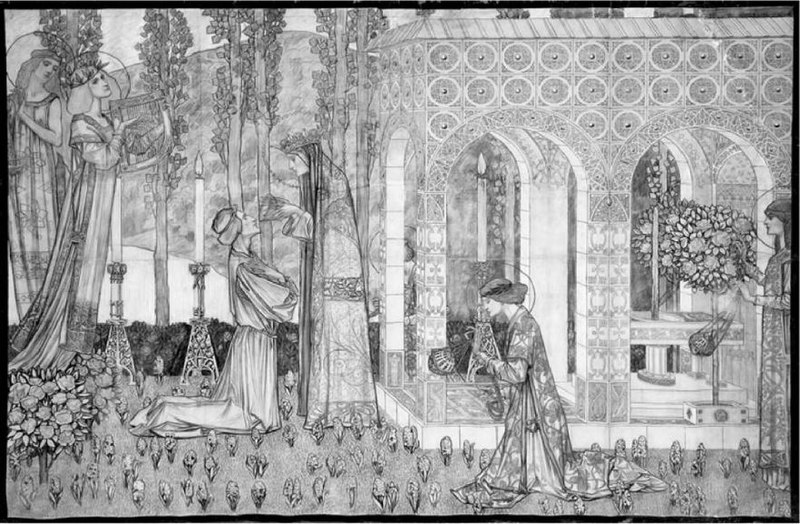
Sketch for the central panel from Die Weihe am mystischen Quell. The poet Stefan George is seen receiving the potion.

He was born to Theodor Lechter (1825–1882), a merchant from Hamm, and his wife, Catharina née Terwort (1825–1883). As he appeared to have some artistic ability, at the age of fourteen he began training as a glass painter. After work, he took classes in drawing and painting at the artists' cooperative. His earliest influences came from the Nazarene painter, Joseph Anton Settegast, who worked at churches throughout that part of Germany. Upon completing his apprenticeship, in 1884, he went to Berlin, where he studied at the University of the Arts. He would be associated with the Academy for ten years.

He initially supported himself by producing practical art, such as advertising materials, until 1896, when the Fritz Gurlitt Gallery presented an exhibition of his serious works; including stained glass windows depicting Tristan and Isolde. As a result, the architect, Franz Schwechten, commissioned him to create windows for Saint Simeon's Church and the First Romanesque House. The latter was destroyed during World War II. In 1898, the furniture manufacturer, Jakob Pallenberg, commissioned windows and a mural for the Museum of Applied Arts in Cologne.

His designs were awarded a major prize at the Exposition Universelle (1900). Around this time, he became associated with the Buchkunstbewegung (Book Art Movement). One his first creations was the title page for Architektonische Charakterbilder, edited by Bruno Möhring. He later met the poet and translator, Stefan George, and would create numerous designs for his publisher, Georg Bondi Verlag.

In 1903, he completed what he considered his greatest work: the mural, commissioned in 1898, for what was by then known as Pallenberg Hall, at the Museum of Applied Arts. Called "Die Weihe am mystischen Quell" (Consecration at the Mystical Spring), it shows Stefan George "receiving the mystical source of potion", and symbolizes the "exaltation, liberation and perpetuation of man through art". Unfortunately, in 1943, the museum was bombed out by an Allied attack. In 1906, perhaps inspired by his research for the mural, he joined the Theosophical Society Adyar. Four years later, he visited their headquarters in India with the writer, Karl Wolfskehl. Upon their return, his diary, with illustrations, was published in a limited edition by his own Einhorn Press, which specialized in books about Stefan George, Christianity, and Indian philosophy.

In 1921, he visited the spa town of Bad Orb and, after many years without inspiration, had what he described as a "creative frenzy". He would become a frequent visitor and guest there throughout the twenties and early thirties, and a major contributor to the local culture; together with the composer, Albert Jung, and the clergyman, Richard Zentgraf, who wrote three books about Bad Orb and its history that Lechter illustrated.

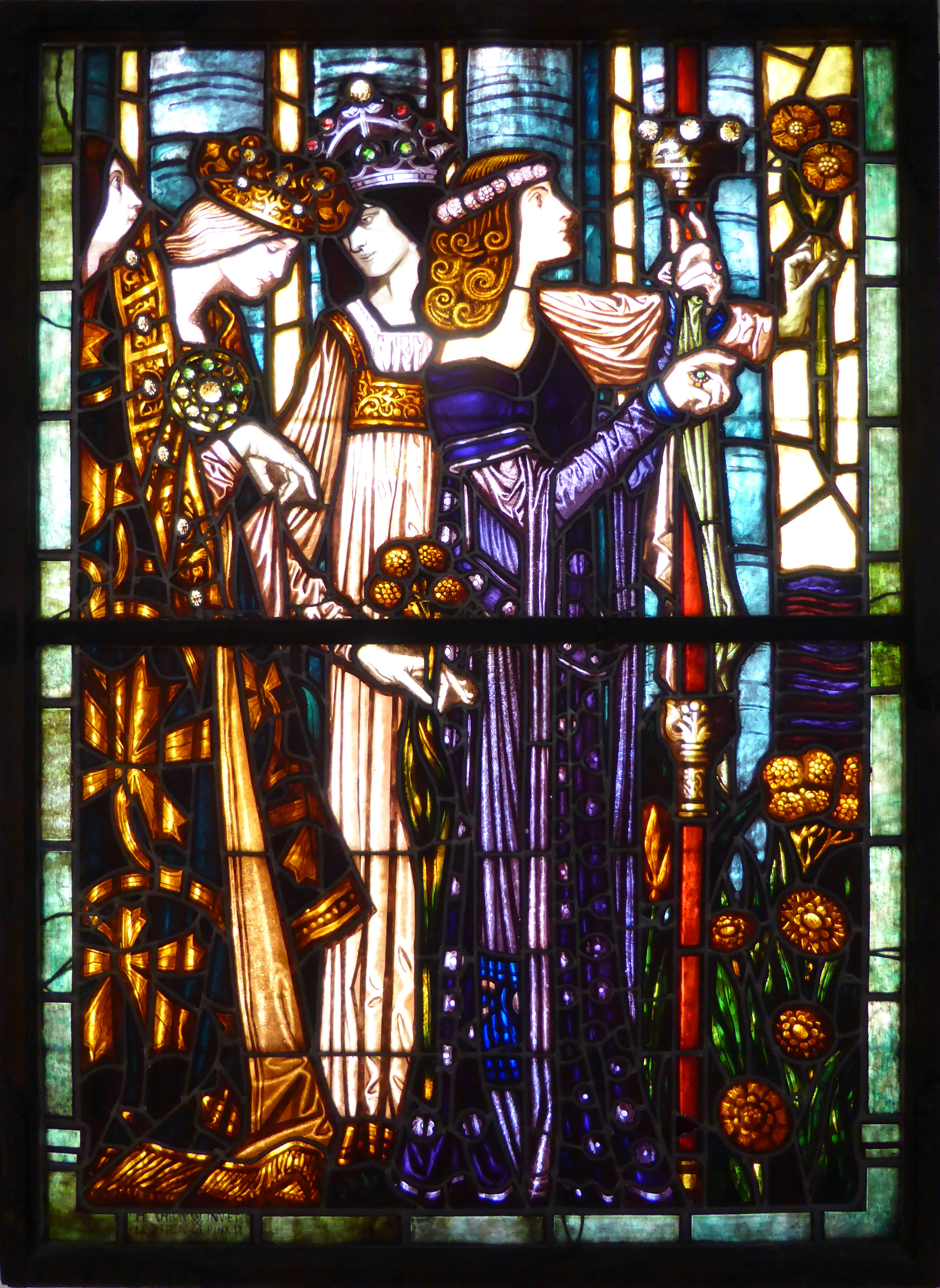
Surviving section of the "Pallenberg Window", now on display at the new Museum of Applied Arts in Cologne

He died in Switzerland, shortly after his 72nd birthday, while visiting the grave of Rainer Maria Rilke.
