= Zollern II/IV Colliery =

Coal mine in Dortmund, Germany

Coordinates: 51.518°N 7.334°E

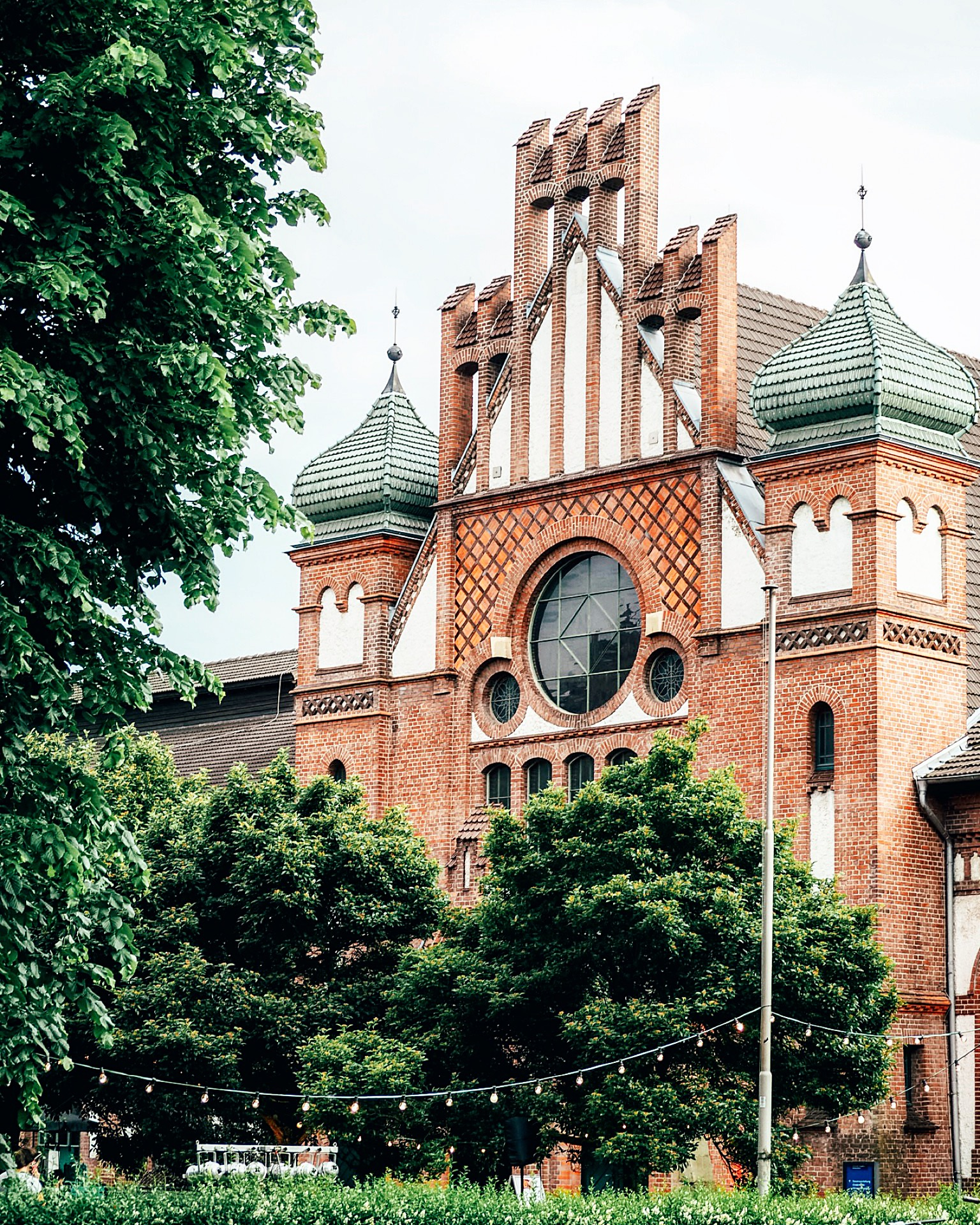
Headframe Zollern II/IV

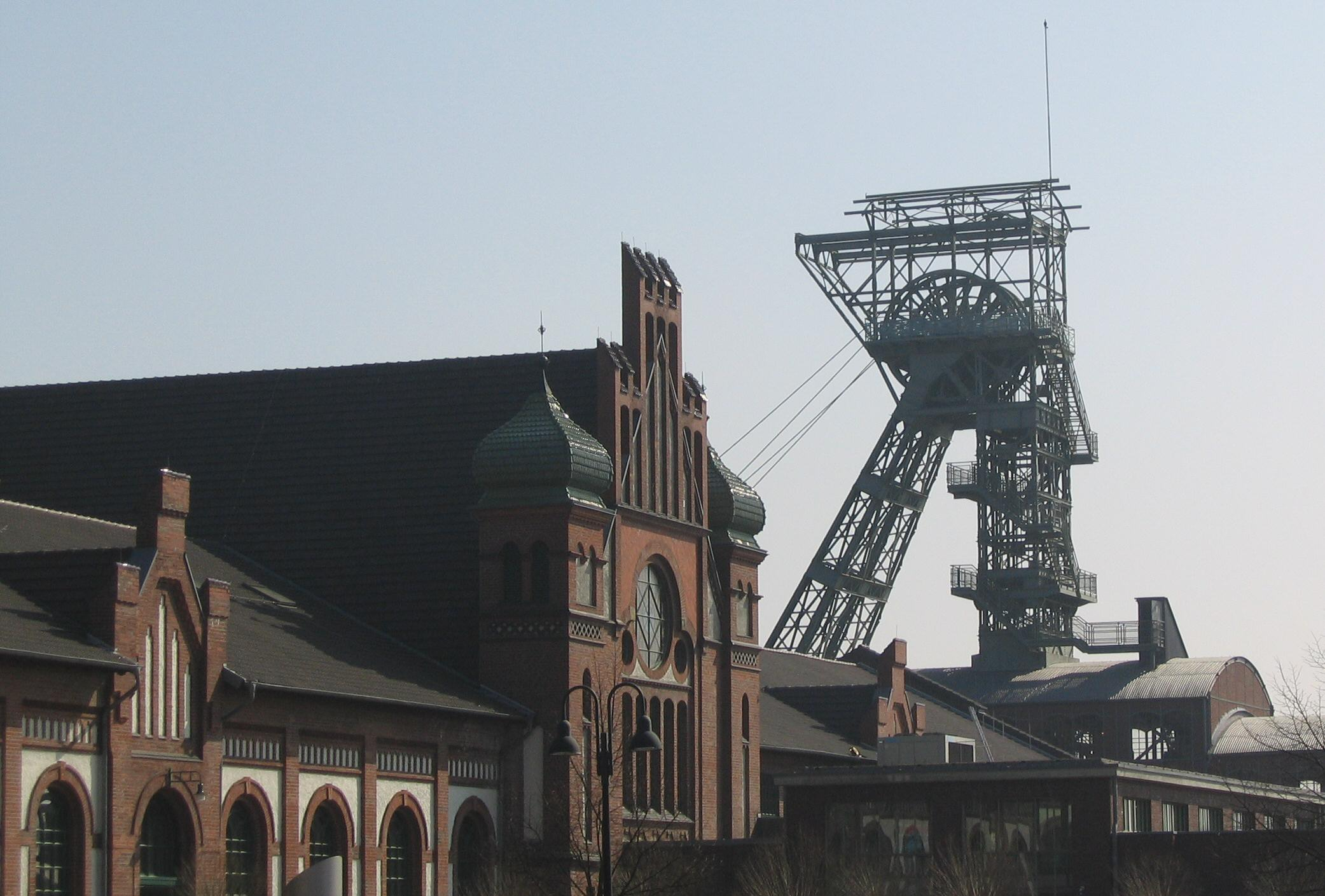
Headframe Zollern II/IV

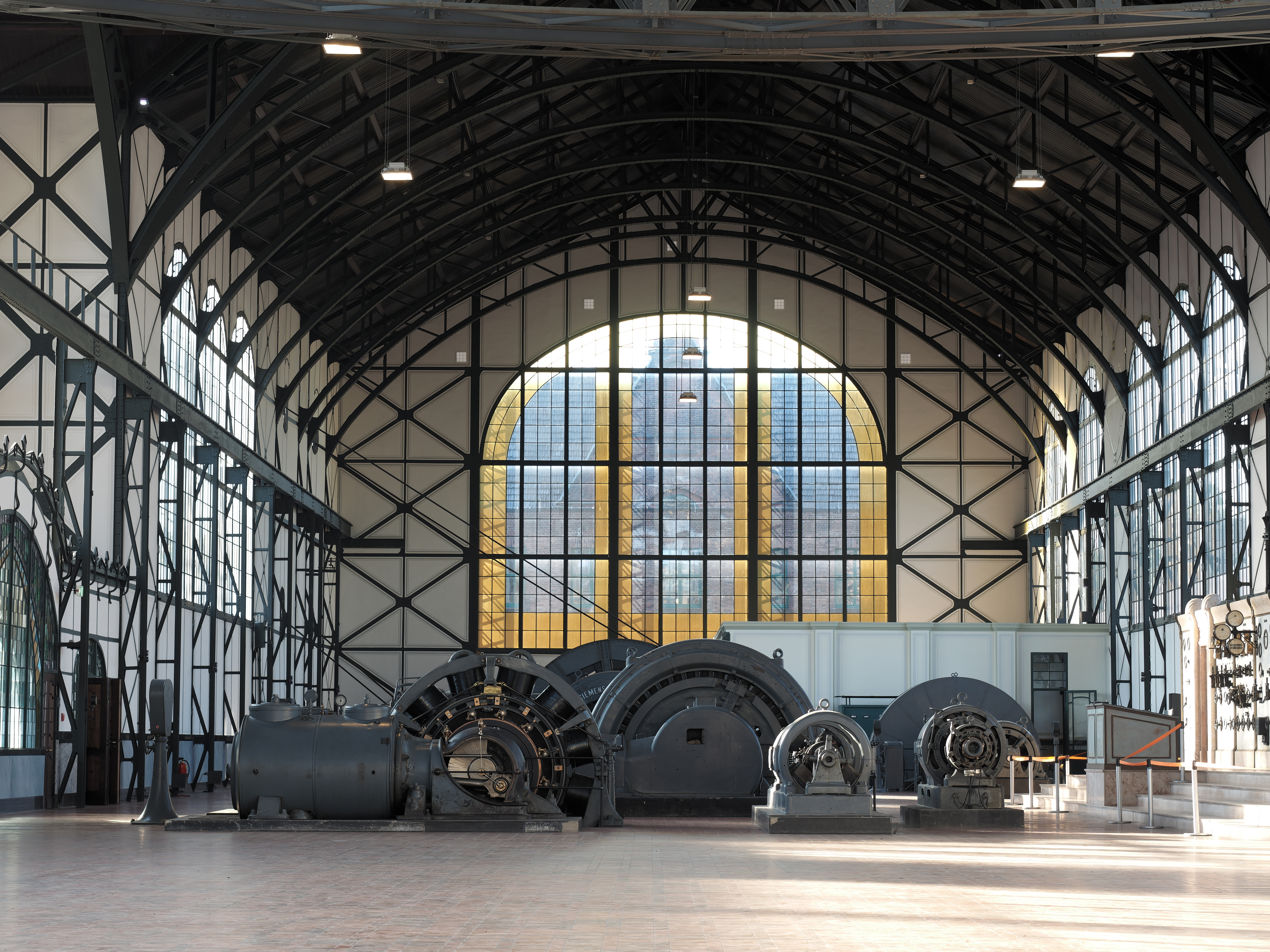
Machine hall after renovation

The Zeche Zollern II/IV (translated: Zollern II/IV Colliery) is located in the northwestern suburb of Bövinghausen of Dortmund, Germany. The Gelsenkirchener Bergwerks-AG projected Zollern in 1898 as a model colliery.

== Colliery ==
Ground-up construction began in 1898 on a new site. Most of the buildings of the colliery were built in solid brickwork by the architect Paul Knobbe and were completed in 1904 with the central engine house, in which the most up-to-date generators and machinery used in the colliery were housed. The architecture and state-of-the-art technology support the transition of Gothic-revival to Art Nouveau and the industrialization of the early 1900s.

Due to deadline pressure, the central engine house was built in iron framework construction with infilling of red brickwork, planned and executed by the Gutehoffnungshütte. The Art Nouveau styled main entrance was designed by the Berlin architect Bruno Möhring, it shows a lead glazing of blue, green and-glass. Counterpart of the main entrance is the big control board of polished marble in brass mounting, with a brass clock hanging from above.

Other buildings on the site include administration bureaus, blacksmith's shop and carpenter's shop, first-aid and fire station with stable, pithead baths, tools store and the central gateway.

== Museum ==
In 1969, three years after it closed down, the colliery was recognized as Germany's first technical building monument of international importance. Since 1981, it has been the headquarters of the Westphalian Industrial Museum.

The original pit frames had been scrapped before 1969, two similar constructions from other collieries were reconstructed on this site in the 1980s.

The museum is an anchor point on the European Route of Industrial Heritage.
