= Jacob Hilsdorf =

German photographer (1872–1916)

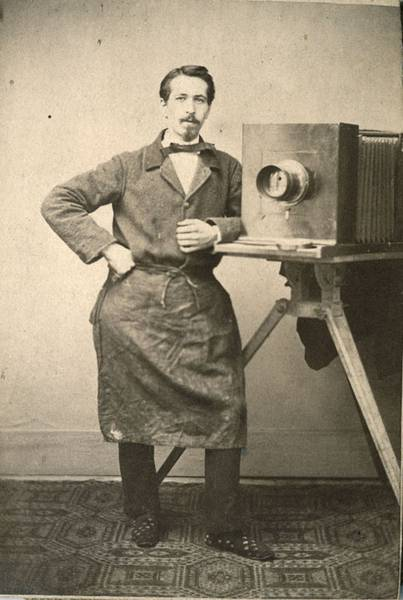
Jacob Hilsdorf (c. 1900)

Jacob Hilsdorf (10 June 1872 – 11 January 1916) was a German photographer.

== Life and work ==
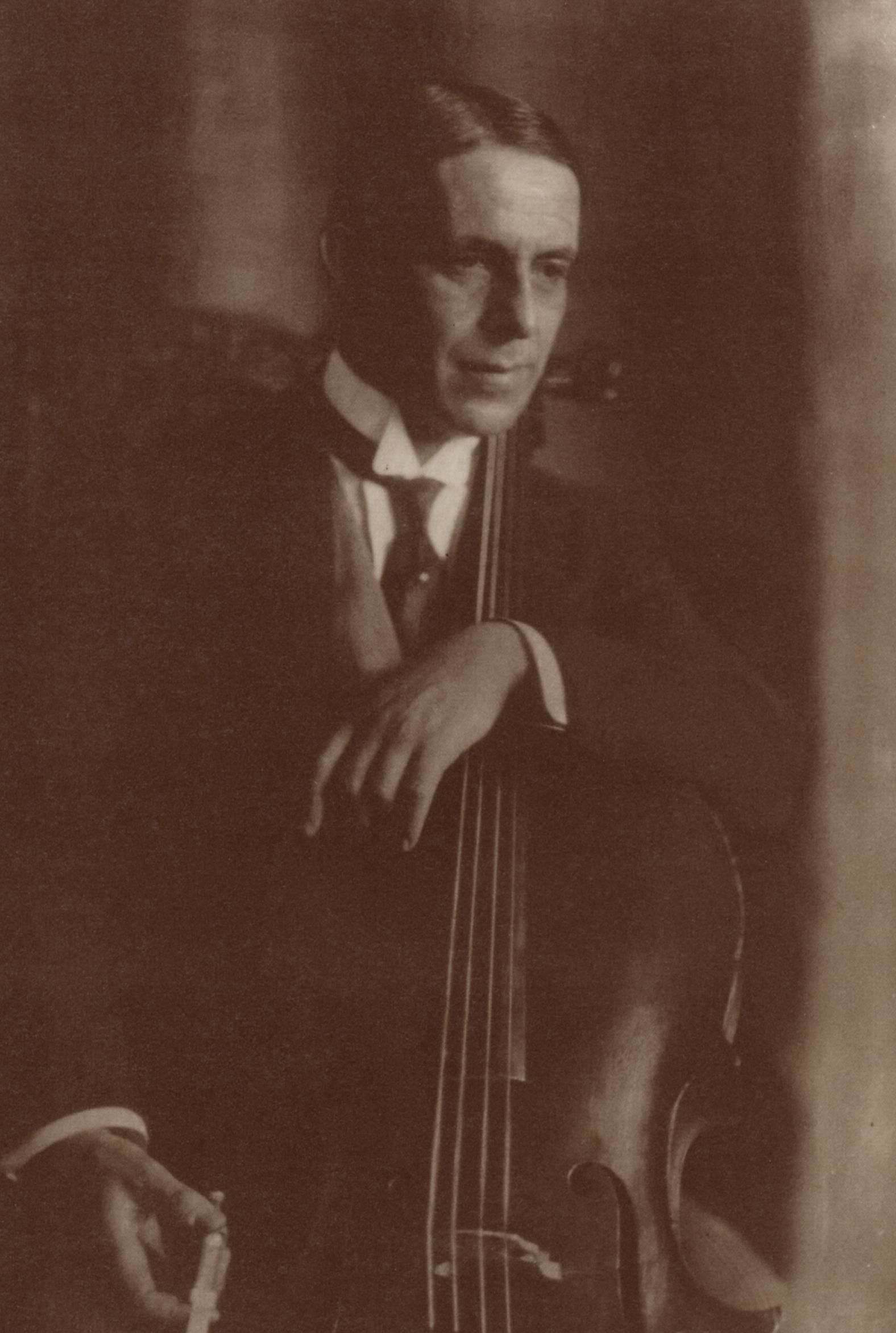
Self-portrait with cello

His father, Johann Baptist Hilsdorf, was also a photographer. He and his older brother, Theodor, who would also become a photographer, took their first lessons in his studio. They also studied drawing with an artist in Mainz. After completing his training, he worked at the studios of Nicola Perscheid in Leipzig. There, he met Elisabeth Gausche, who he married in 1897 in Bad Kreuznach. When his father died, he took over the studio in Bingen and hired his brother, Hans, as an assistant.

Around the turn of the century, he came into contact with many well-known personalities; including the intellectuals who associated with the poet, Stefan George. He first made his name in 1903, with a series of photographs featuring the artist, Melchior Lechter, then went on to do portraits of painters, musicians, and writers, as well as members of the nobility and politicians. In 1912, Ernest Louis, Grand Duke of Hesse, named him a "Grand Ducal Councilor", in recognition of his work for the Royal Family.

Despite his success, he was plagued with personal problems. His marriage to Elisabeth ended in divorce in 1909. Two years later, he married Ellen Hasenclever, but their relationship was also troubled and unhappy. In 1915, he began to display symptoms of mental illness. Early the following year, he committed suicide.

His work was mostly forgotten until a major retrospective was held in Bingen in 1978. A large collection of his photographs and plates is held by the Landesmuseum Koblenz.

== Selected portraits ==
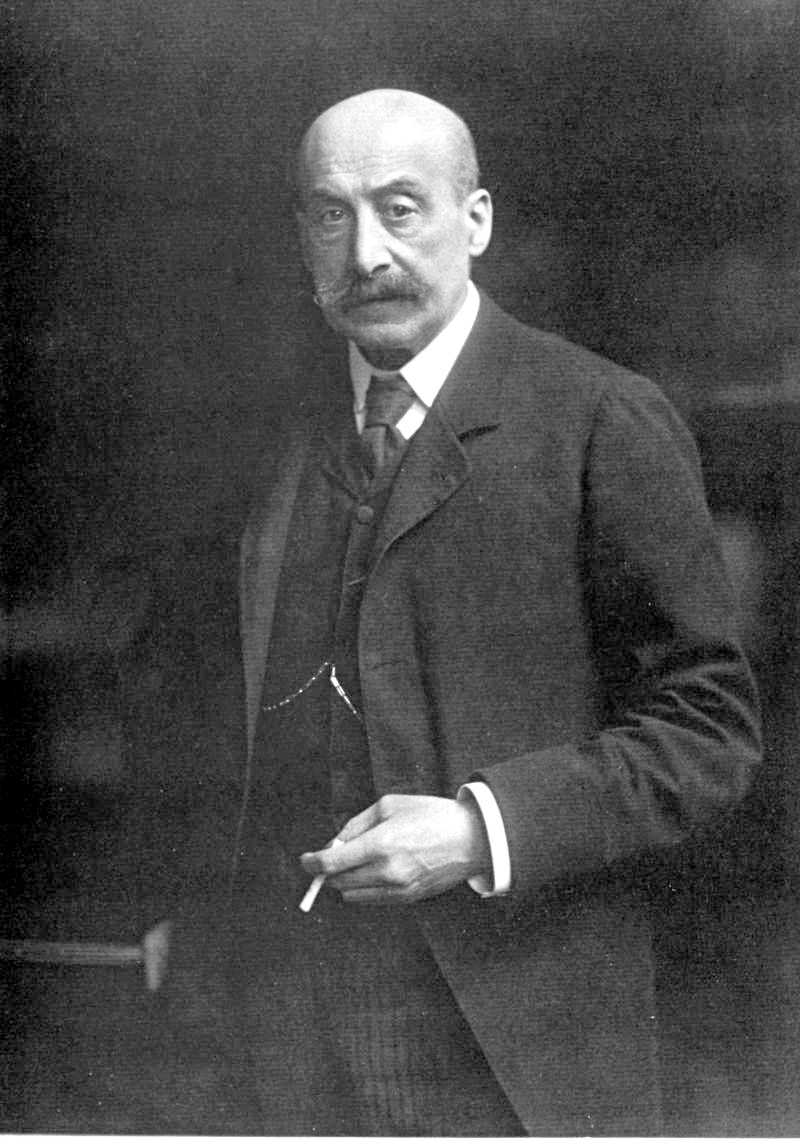
Max Liebermann (1904)

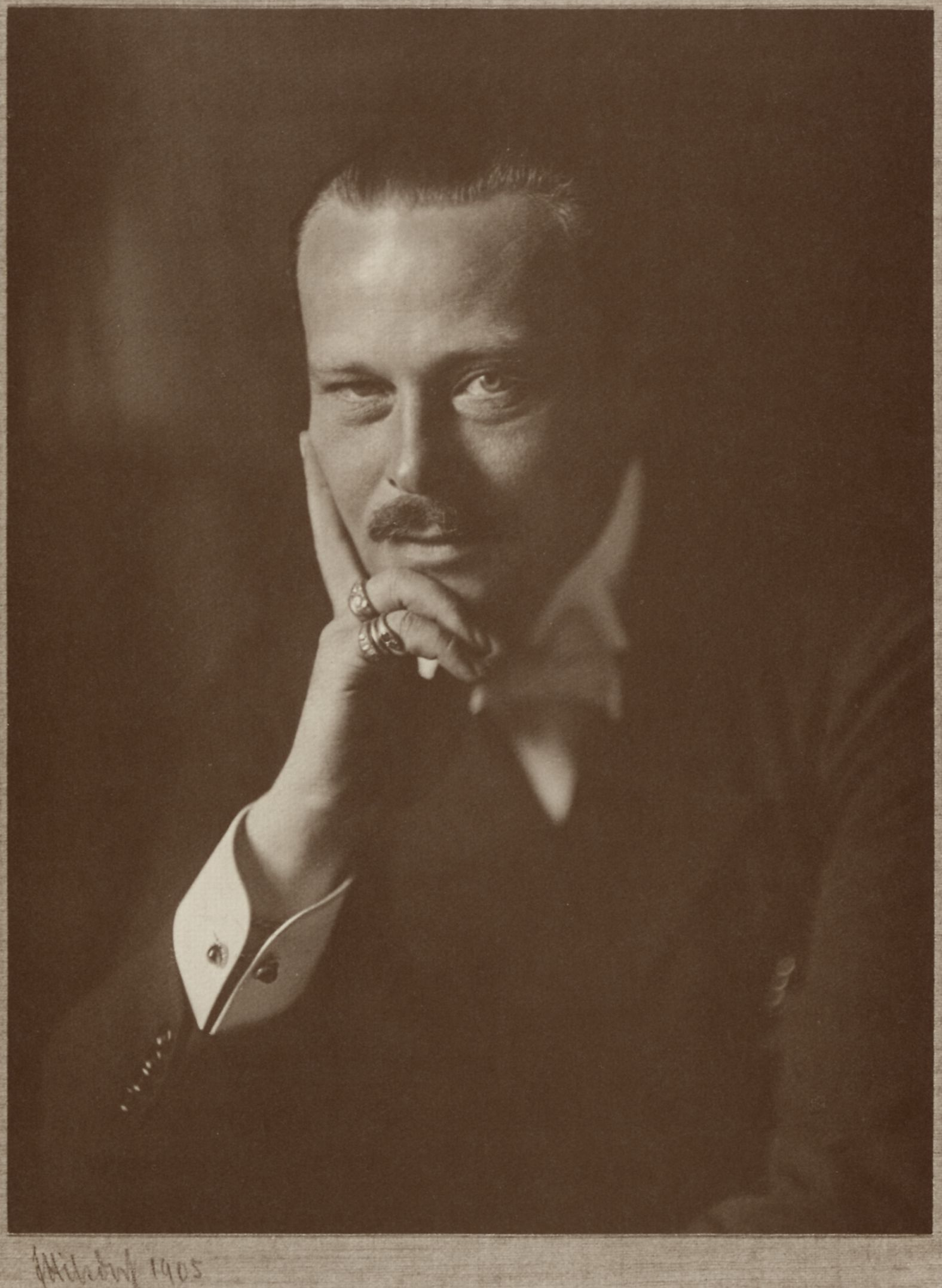
Ernest Louis, Grand Duke of Hesse (1905)

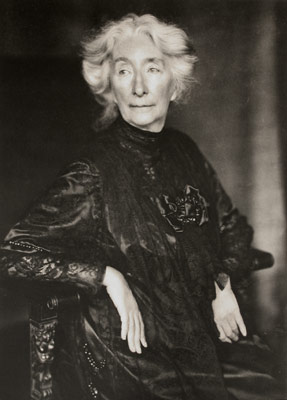
Cosima Wagner (1905)

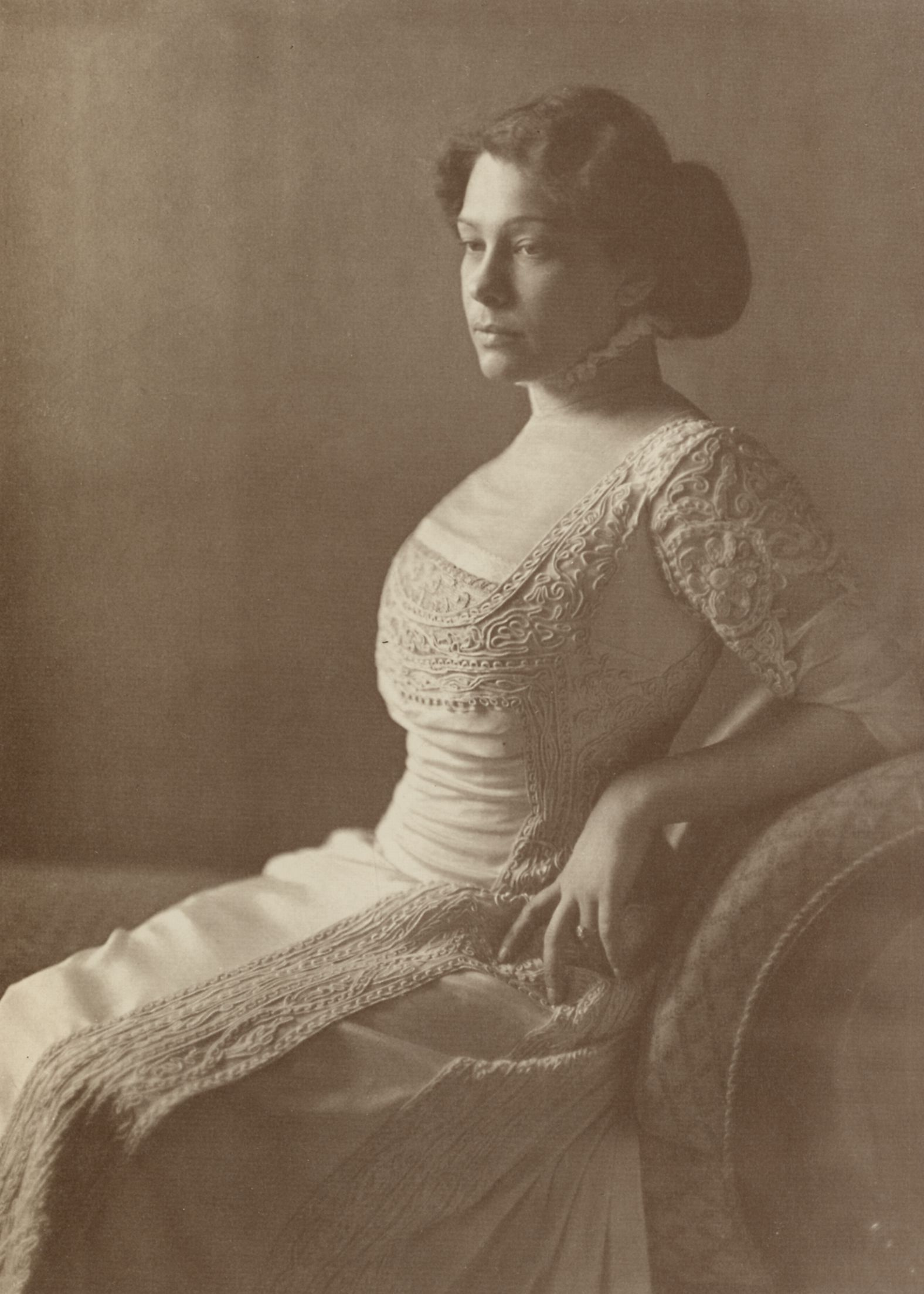
Tilla Durieux (1905)

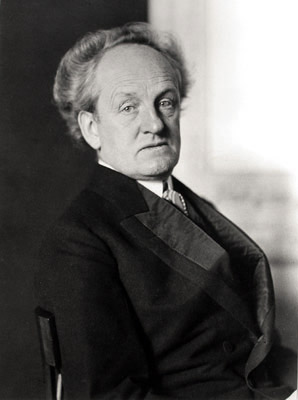
Gerhart Hauptmann (1905)

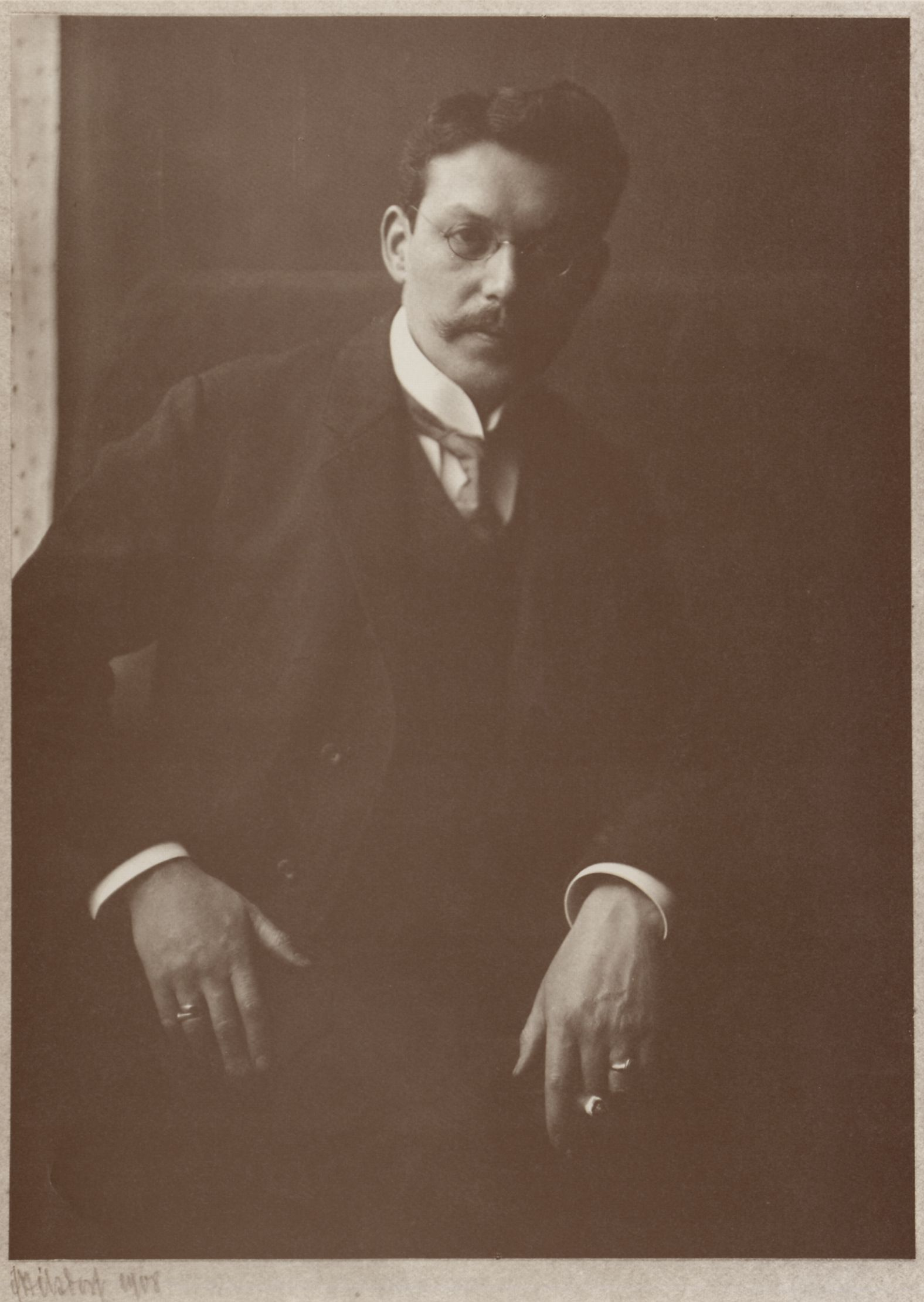
His brother, Theodor Hilsdorf (1908)

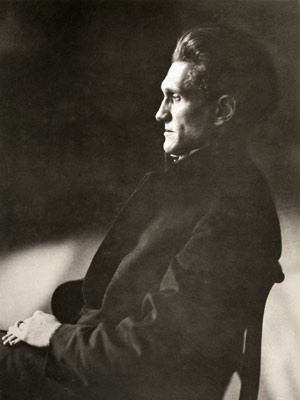
Stefan George (1910)

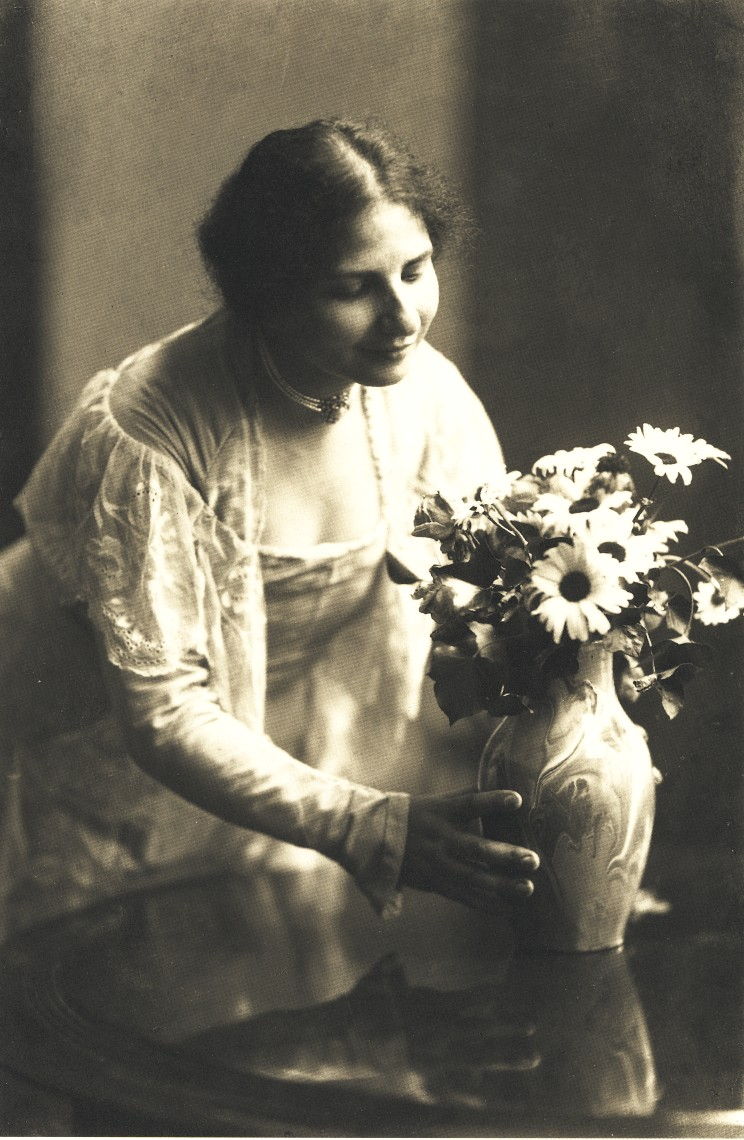
Ida Dehmel (undated)

== Sources ==
- Berthold Roland (Ed.): Nicola Perscheid, Theodor und Jacob Hilsdorf, August Sander. Der rheinland-pfälzische Beitrag zur Geschichte der Photographie, exhibition catalog, Landesmuseum Mainz, 1989 ISBN 978-3-87439-204-4
- (in German) Philipp Freytag: Hilsdorf, Jacob. In: Allgemeines Künstlerlexikon. Die Bildenden Künstler aller Zeiten und Völker (AKL). Band 73, de Gruyter, Berlin 2011, ISBN 978-3-11-023178-6, S. 248
