= Baile de Máscaras =

Studio album by Maldita Vecindad
- Released: May 7, 1996
- Recorded: December 1995 - February 1996
- Studio: House of Blues Studio, Nashville, Tennessee
- Genre: Rock en español
- Label: BMG Mexico

Maldita Vecindad chronology
En Vivo (1993)	Baile de Máscaras (1996)	Mostros (1998)

Professional ratings
Review scores
Source	Rating
Allmusic	2.5/5 stars

Baile de Máscaras is the fourth album recorded by Mexican rock band Maldita Vecindad y los Hijos del Quinto Patio. The LP was released on May 7, 1996 under the BMG label.

== Track listing ==
1. "Viva mi desgracia (Organillero)"
2. "El Chulo"
3. "Por ahí"
4. "Vuelta tras vuelta"
5. "No les creo nada"
6. "El dedo"
7. "Salta pa"trás"
8. "Ojos negros"
9. "Cenizas"
10. "El Vigilante"
11. "Aunque"
12. "Don Palabras"
13. "Vida vidrio"
14. "Canción Omaha"
15. "Lamento"

== Personnel ==
- Roco - vocals
- Pato - bass
- Pacho - drums
- Sax - saxophones
