= Bruno Möhring =

German architect (1863–1929)

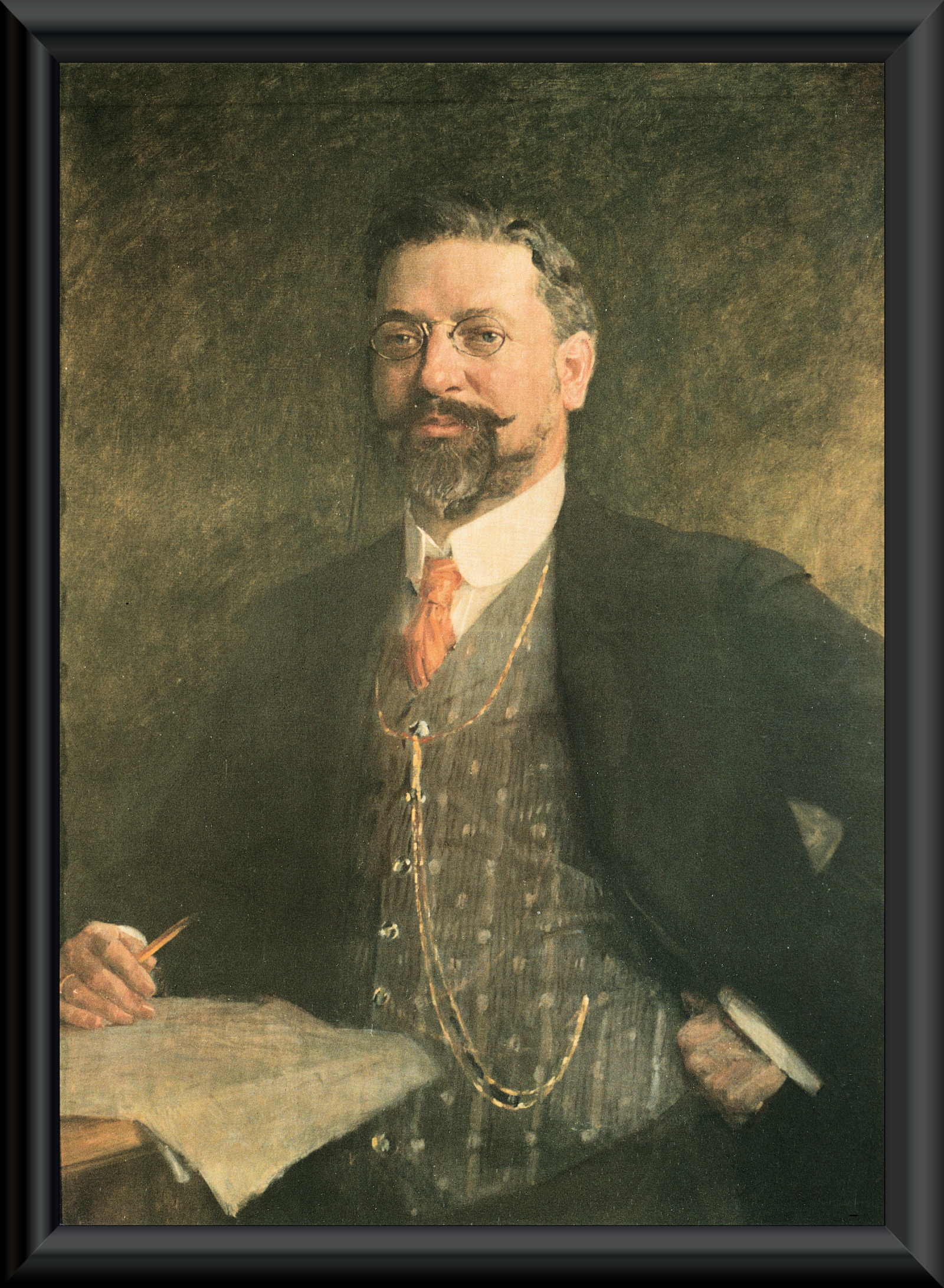
- Portrait by an unknown artist (1905)
- Born: 11 December 1863; Königsberg, Province of Prussia, Kingdom of Prussia
- Died: 25/26 March 1929 (aged 65); Berlin, Germany
- Spouse: Anna nee Burghardt (1866–1939)
- Children: four
- Parent(s): Karl Theodor Moehring and Maria Dorothea Möhring (Kretschmann)

Bruno Möhring (11 December 1863 – 25/26 March 1929) was a German architect, urban planner, designer and a professor in Berlin. He was one of the most important architects of the Jugendstil style in Germany. He received his education at the Technische Hochschule in Charlottenburg.

== Early life ==
Möhring was born on 11 December 1863, at Königsberg (East Prussia) to Karl Theodor Möhring and Maria Dorothea Kretschmann Möhring (Kretschmann). His father was an accountant and attorney. After completing the gymnasium in Königsberg, Möhring spent a year training as an apprentice to a builder. He then studied architecture at the Königlich Technische Hochschule in Charlottenburg. His tutors at the institute were Hermann Ende, Carl Schäfer, Johannes Otzen and Johann Eduard Jacobsthal (well known as the architect of major bridges). As part of his training in architecture, Möhring toured Italy and places of medieval German architecture in Nuremberg. His visit to Italy helped him to gain knowledge of the historical development of architecture.

== Career ==
Möhring, who was more interested in practical than theoretical aspects of architectural design, started his career as a staff architect with the Berlin Offices for Civil Engineering. Here, between 1888 and 1890, he honed his skills in construction and material technology. He then launched his own business and specialised initially in architectural decoration of iron structures, particularly bridges.

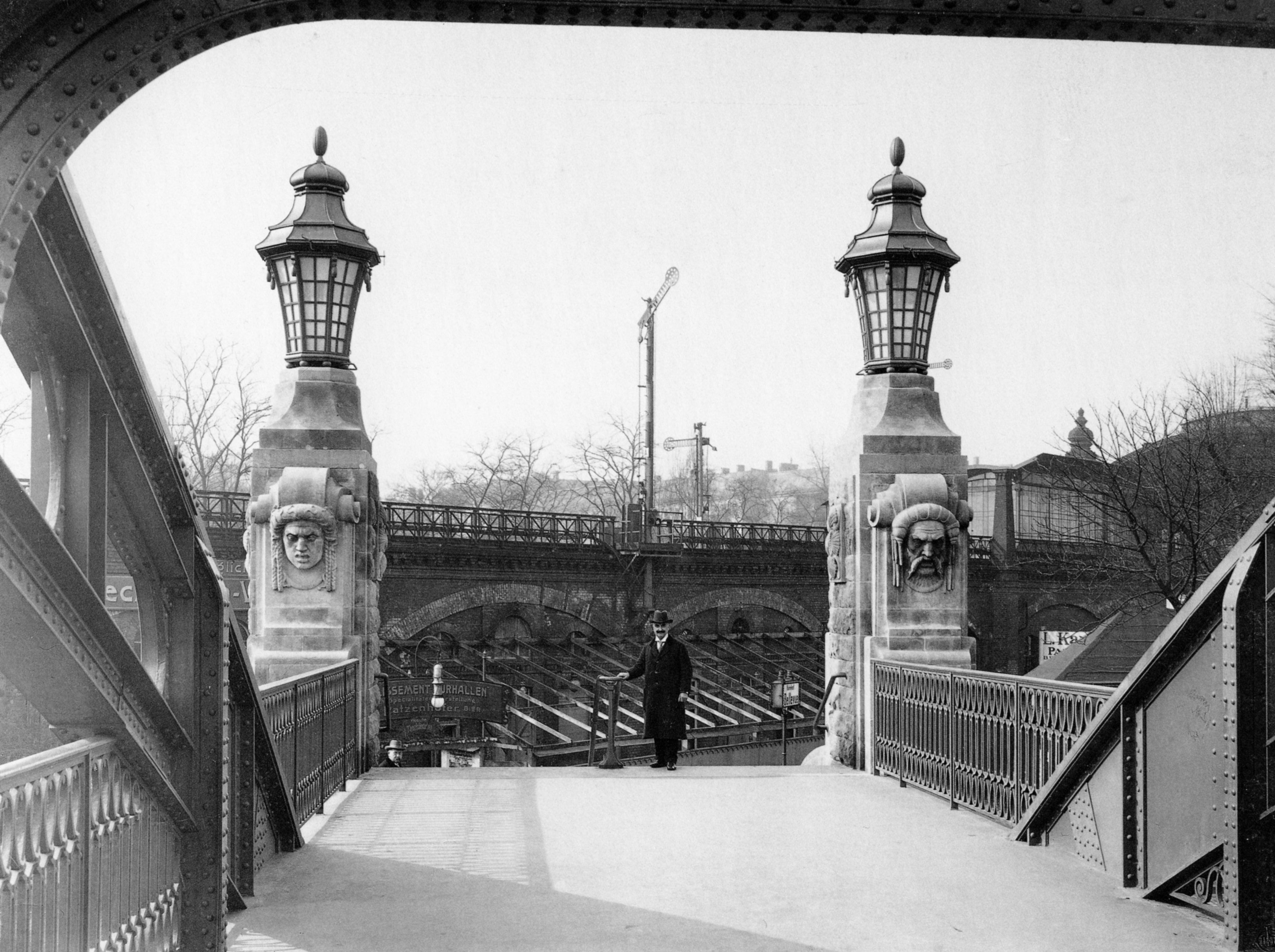
Gerickesteg pedestrian bridge at Bellevue S-Bahn station, Berlin, as originally built to Möhring's design (1915)

In 1907, the Berlin Architects Association invited architects to submit plans for the development of Berlin's public buildings. Bruno and his associate Rudolph Eberstadt submitted a proposal for an imperial forum in which the Ministry of War building was proposed opposite to the Reichstag, which was symbolic "of the army and the people, the true bearers of German greatness and power unified in the monuments of architecture". In 1910, apart from bridges, he became associated with urban planning, working in Greater Berlin with associates, Rudolf Eberstadt and Richard Petersen. He and his colleagues developed plans for the Südgelände in Schöneberg and the central district of Berlin-Treptow.

During the early decades of the 20th century, a period when most European architects expressed distaste for the skyscrapers being built in the United States, Möhring expressed his admiration for America's high-rise buildings. In contrast to his German contemporaries who were disturbed by the lack of uniformity in the dimensions and designs of the high-rises, he expressed a preference for buildings of different heights, saying it would be "unbearable" to occupy an environment of "office buildings [that] were all of the same size". He suggested that competitions to have the tallest building "gave life to the city". He urged the construction of new high-rise buildings in Berlin to symbolize the city's enduring vitality and show the world that "Berlin will continue to be a metropolis". As one of the first German architects to embrace the skyscraper as a design concept, he designed and proposed a skyscraper building in Berlin in 1914 at a triangular site on the banks of the Spree River adjacent to the Friedrichstrasse railway station. In 1920, he played a leading role in persuading the Prussian interior ministry to increase the maximum height for buildings from 22 metres (72 ft) to 80 metres (260 ft).

He was a member of several professional organisations, such as the Berlin Architects' Association (VBA) (in 1891), the Architects Association of Berlin (GCI), a member of the Deutscher Werkbund (DWB), the German Association for Arts and Crafts, and many more. In the yearbooks of 1912 and 1913, he is mentioned as a local steward for the District of Berlin.

Journalist

In 1906, he was a permanent editor of the urban design journal Der Städtebau. After World War I, he began publishing and editing articles in the urban planning journal Stadtbaukunst, of which he was co-editor from 1920.

== Notable structures ==
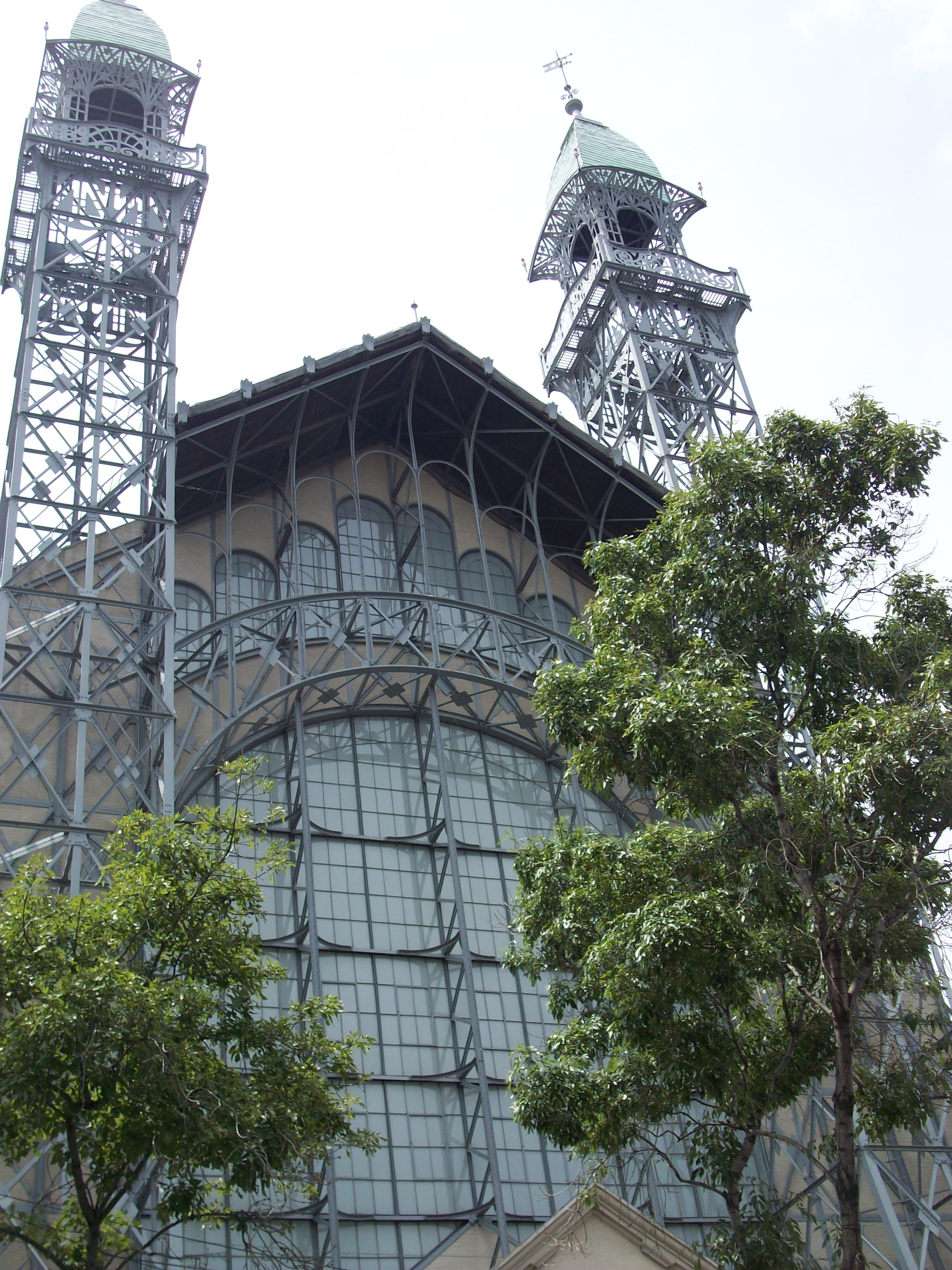
Chopo University Museum in Mexico City

Some of the important bridges and other structures in which his architectural, design and building skills have been found notable are: The Swinemünder Bridge (1902–05) at Berlin, a 228-metre-long (748 ft) bridge; the Rhine Bridge at Bonn, the Mosel Bridge at Traben-Trarbach, and design for the German Embassy at Washington for which he received first prize among 270 competitors. Möhring's design for the entrance to the machine hall for the Zollern II/IV Colliery in Dortmund, now the headquarters of the Westphalian Industrial Museum, is considered a fine example of Jugendstil design in an industrial setting. A Möhring building from the 1902 Düsseldorf Industry and Trade Exposition was brought to Mexico City and now houses the Chopo University Museum of contemporary art.

== Personal life ==
Möhring married Anna Burghardt (1866–1939). They had three sons. Hans Joachim was the youngest who died in 1907 as a child. His second son, Bruno, born in 1899, died in the First World War. Their eldest son, born in 1897, also became an architect like his father, inherited his legacy, but died prematurely in 1945 and could not live long to promote his father's Jugendstil architecture.

During the last stages of his life, Bruno Möhring suffered from many illnesses. He died in Berlin on 25/26 March 1929.
