= Maldita Vecindad =

Mexican band

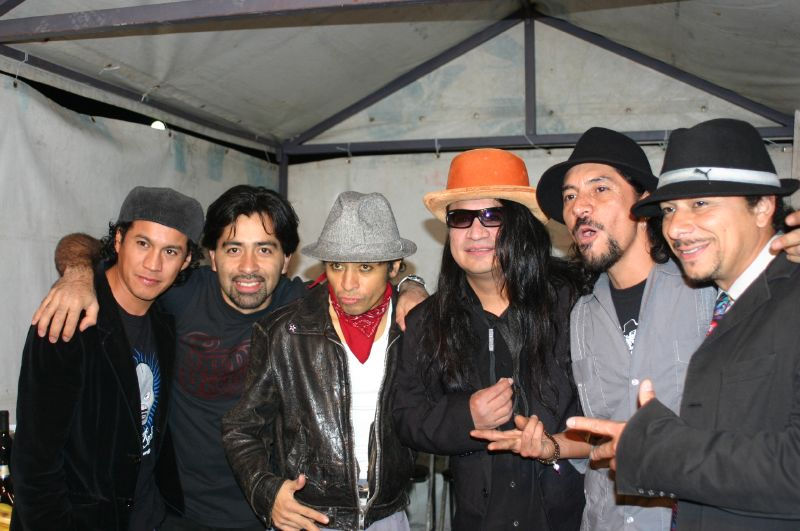
- Maldita Vecindad in November 2006

Background information
- Also known as: La Maldita
- Origin: Mexico City, Mexico
- Genres: Rock en español
- Years active: 1985–present
- Labels: BMG, RCA, Nacional Records

La Maldita Vecindad y los Hijos del Quinto Patio (English: The Damned Neighborhood and the Sons of the Fifth Courtyard, usually called only "La Maldita") is a band formed in Mexico City in 1985. They are pioneers of rock en español and one of the most influential rock bands in Mexico.

They first made an impact with Mojado, Un poco de sangre, Cocodrilo, Pachuco and Un gran circo, songs that narrate the problems, adventures, and beauty of a society anxious to improve its economic status. Their wardrobe has incorporated elements of the pachuco, an archetypical character represented by Tin Tán in Mexican cinema. Tin Tan is sampled in one of the group's biggest hits, 1991's Pachuco.

The last studio album they recorded was in 2009. Since then, the band has collaborated with other bands, as well as having participated in tribute albums for José José and the Tigres del Norte. Their sound incorporates many styles, including ska, rock, and traditional Cuban forms such as the bolero and Cuban Son. Roco, the band's vocalist, dresses in a manner reminiscent of the pachucos.

== History ==
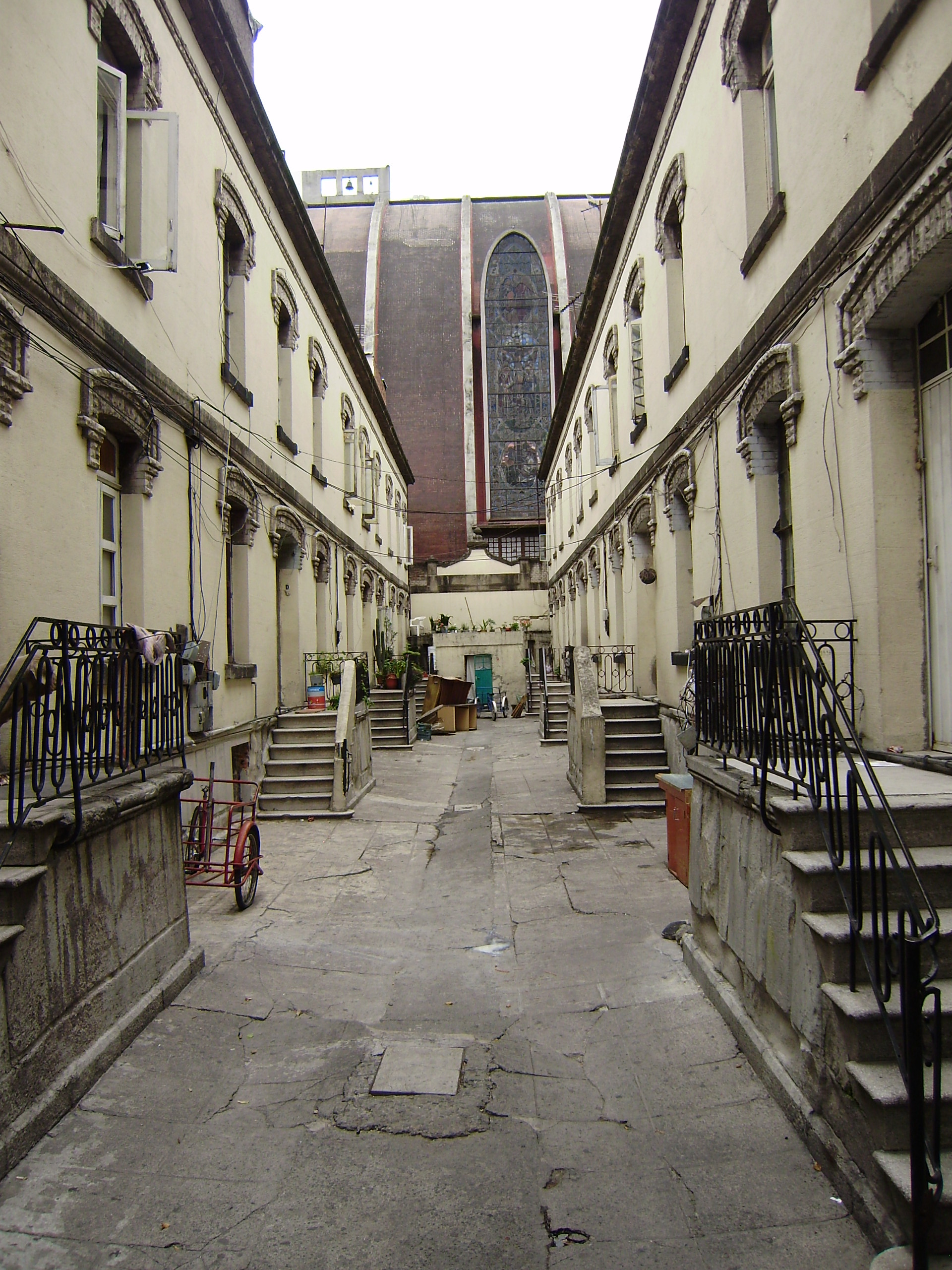
Neighborhood of Colonia Roma Mexico City, Puebla Street

At the end of the 1980s, a movement began called Rock en tu idioma (Rock in Your Language), and a marketing strategy was developed by record labels to draw attention of young people to the new trend, which began in Argentina. Influential bands like Soda Stereo, Los Enanitos Verdes, Virus, Heroes del Silencio, Autobús, and Zas, the band of Miguel Mateos, were among the pioneers who first played authentic rock music in Spanish. Consequently, Mexican bands began to sprout. Many of these were influenced by groups like The Police, The Cure, Paralamas do Sucesso, and others. The early bands of the movement, Caifanes, Maldita Vecindad, Café Tacuba achieved huge sales and great international recognition.

La Maldita Vecindad appeared on the music scene with a new style that was unheard of in Mexico at the time. It combined strong elements of ska, rock and traditional Mexican music. This included the attire of Roco, inspired by the pachuco culture represented by Tin Tan, the incorporation of a saxophone, and a celebration of the street culture of Mexico City.

From 1986 to 1988, the band participated actively in popular movements like the one for the victims of the earthquake of 1985 and the elections of 1988.

Their second album El circo turned them into a commercial success. The album reached over 800,000 copies sold (a record high at the time). In 1991, on their first U.S. tour, they played with groups like INXS, Bob Dylan, Leonard Cohen, Sonic Youth, Madness, Faith No More and Jane's Addiction. By 1992, they were often compared to other great Latin American bands like Mano Negra and Los Fabulosos Cadillacs.

Throughout their career, La Maldita Vecindad has remained a creative force. It has also managed to create unique covers of songs by artists from strikingly different genres, like Los Tigres del Norte, Armando Manzanero and Juan Gabriel.

Their newest album, Circular colectivo, (Nacional Records 2010) maintains much of the ska/punk energy, with a contemporary sound. The lyrics talk about the crisis that Mexican society faces in a rapidly changing global economy and pays tribute to Rahsaan Roland Kirk and Ernest Ranglin. The production by San Francisco-based Greg Landau (Susana Baca, Patato Valdez, Quetzal) and Hector "Hecdog" Perez, has helped the band to craft a new path in Mexican music. The album features two cameos by Cuban pianist Omar Sosa.

Eulalio Cervantes Galarza, better known as Sax, died at the age of 52 after contracting COVID-19 in March 2021.

== Name ==
In Mexico City, a vecindad (literally meaning "neighborhood") refers to residential constructions that were built at the end of the nineteenth and at the beginning of the twentieth centuries. Still inhabited today, these residential areas share one or more large patios and common areas such as bathrooms and laundry facilities, as the rented rooms do not have them. The more patios a vecindad has, the more populated the buildings are, and therefore the poorer they tend to be.

The latter portion of the name, "the children of the fifth patio" stems from a 1950 Mexican film called "The Fifth Patio", which details the history of families living in poverty in the fifth patio of a vecindad in downtown Mexico City. In the twentieth century, a vecindad located in the Santa María La Ribera suburb had a front door that bore a resemblance to the one of the film's. As such, residents of the neighborhood began to call it "The Fifth Patio". Most of the band members were born and raised in that vecindad,.

== Members ==
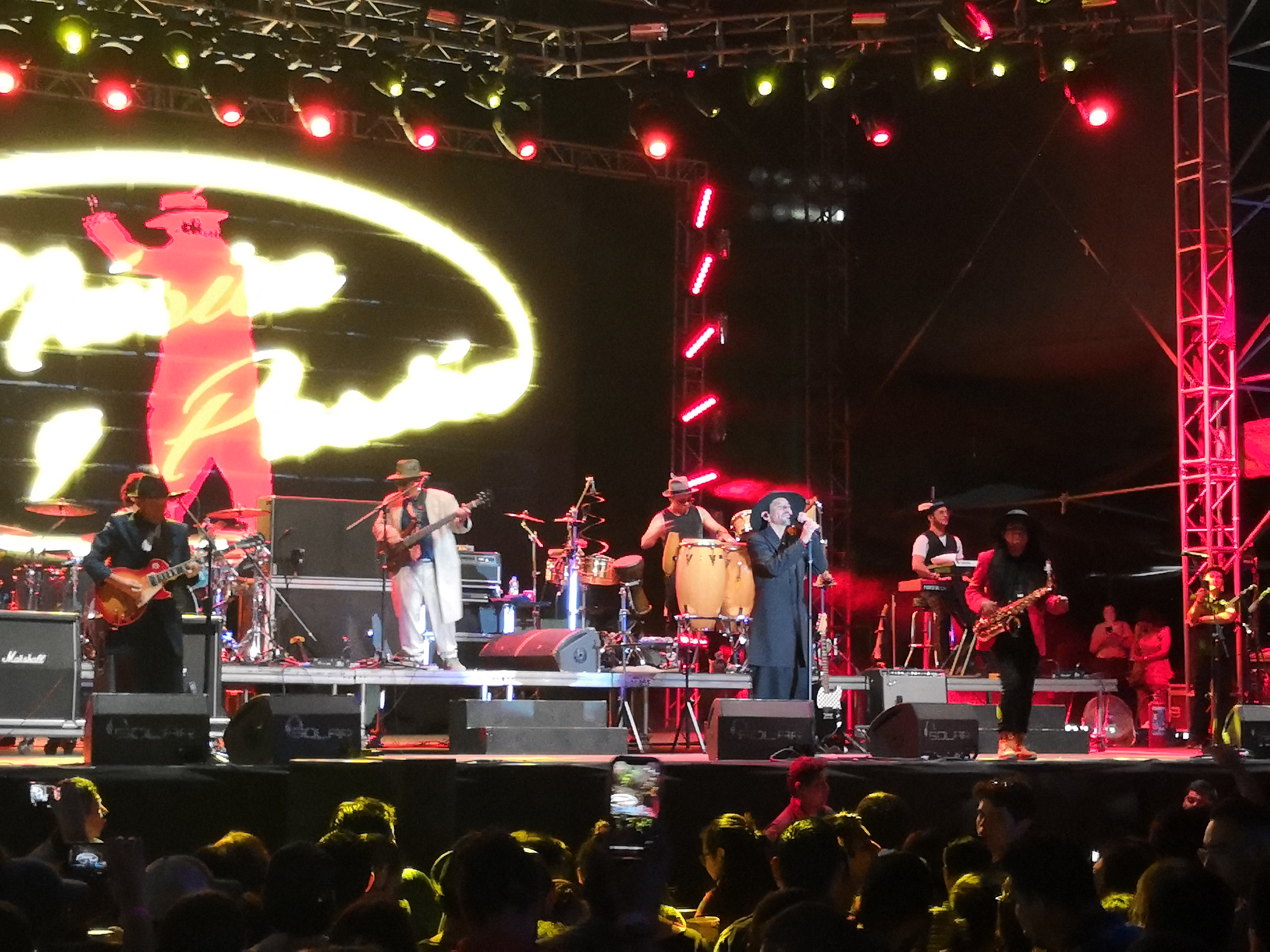
In concert

- Rolando Rocco Ortega: vocals
- Arturo Reyes Tiky Hagen : guitars (1985–1988)
- Enrique Pato Montes: guitars (1988-present)
- Aldo Acuña: bass (1987-present)
- José Luis Paredes Pacho: drums (1985–2002)
- Eulalio Sax Cervantes: saxophones, trumpets, and guitar (1985-2021†)
- Adrian Lobito Navarro Maycote: percussion (1988–93)

== Select discography ==
=== Albums ===
- 1989: Maldita Vecindad y los Hijos del Quinto Patio
- 1991: El circo
- 1993: En Vivo: Gira Pata de Perro (live)
- 1996: Baile de Máscaras
- 1998: Mostros
- 2009: Circular colectivo

=== Compilations ===
- 2000: Maldita Sea, Vol. 1: 1989–199
- 2001: Rock mexicano - Lo mejor de La Maldita Vecindad y los Hijos del Quinto Patio
- 2004: El tiempo vive en la memoria 1989–2004: 15 años de éxitos Maldita Vecindad
