= Museo Universitario del Chopo =

Museum in Mexico City, Mexico

Coordinates: 19.4419°N 99.1567°W

Chopo University Museum
- Museo Universitario del Chopo
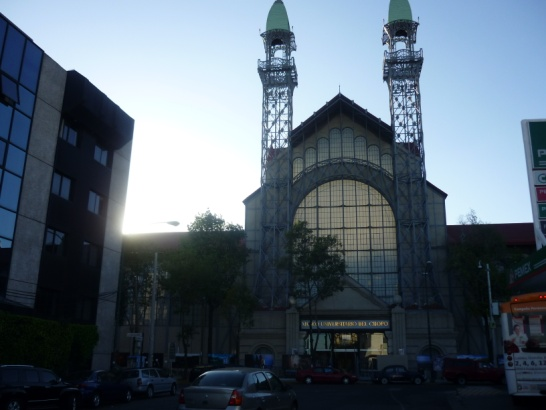
- The Chopo Museum
- Established: November 25, 1975
- Location: Dr. Enrique González Martínez Street, Colonia Santa María la Ribera, Mexico City, Mexico
- Type: Contemporary art
- Director: Sol Henaro Palomino
- Owner: National Autonomous University of Mexico
- Website: www.chopo.unam.mx

The Museo Universitario del Chopo (meaning, "poplar"; locally nicknamed Crystal Palace or simply El Chopo, in Spanish) (Chopo University Museum) is located at Doctor Enrique González Martínez Street in the Colonia Santa María la Ribera of Mexico City. It has collections in contemporary art, and is part of the National Autonomous University of Mexico (UNAM).

== Geography ==
The building is located at #10 Doctor Enrique González Martínez Street in the Colonia Santa María la Ribera, a neighborhood of Mexico City. The streets of Colonia Santa María la Ribera were originally named after trees and flowers. Fittingly, Doctor Enrique González Martínez Street was previously named Poplar ("chopo") Street.

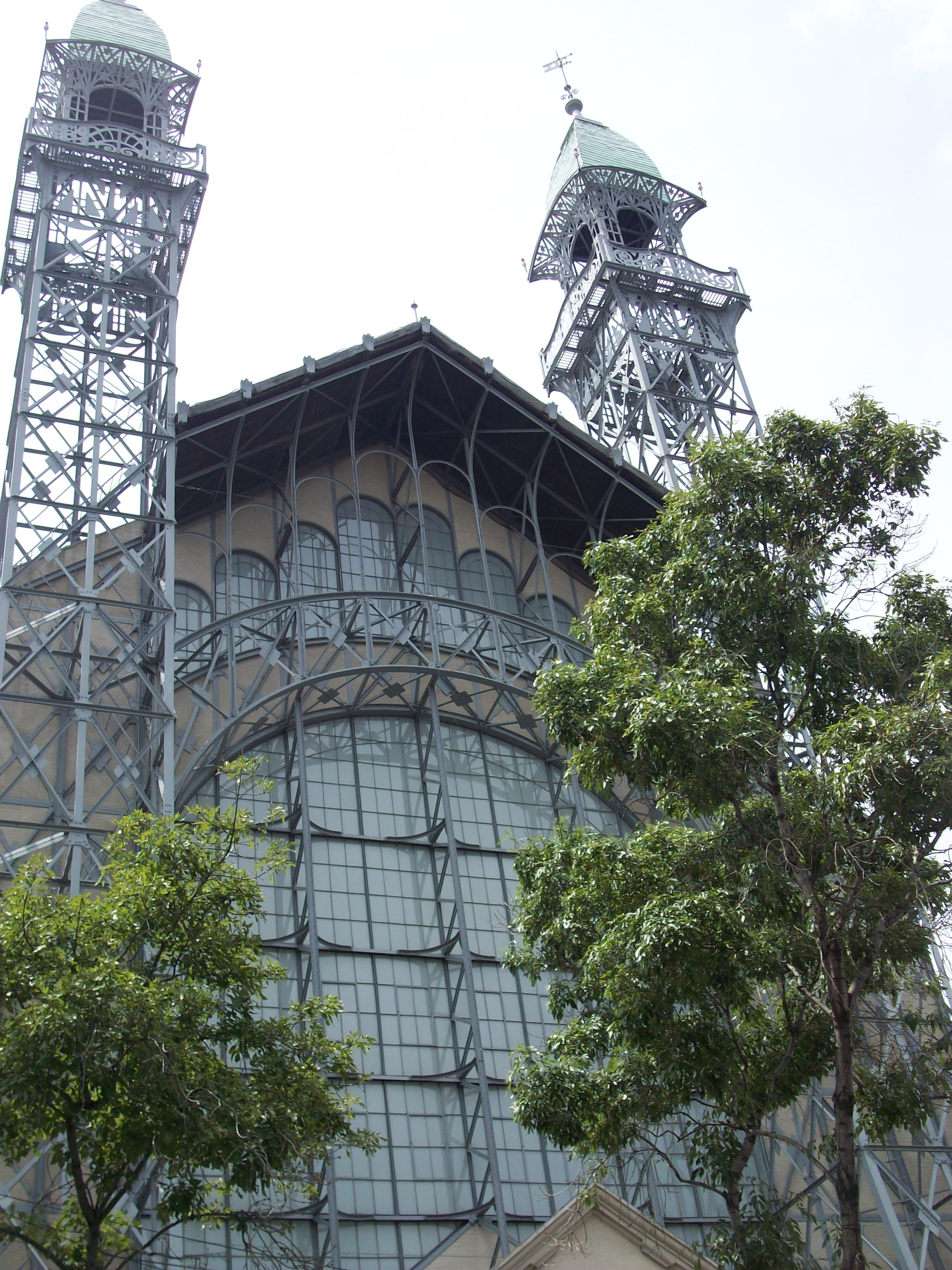
The Chopo Museum towers and facade

== History ==
The building was designed by Bruno Möhring as a pavilion for a 1902 art and textile exhibition in Düsseldorf, Germany. It was manufactured in Oberhausen by Gutehoffnungshütte. After the exhibition fair was over, three of the building's four halls were purchased by José Landero y Coss for the establishment of the Compañía Mexicana de Exposición Permanente, shipped to Mexico, and reassembled between 1903 and 1905 at the Colonia Santa María la Ribera site, under the auspices of the engineers Hugo Dorner Bacmeister and Aurelio Luis Ruelas.

In 1905, Landero y Coss' company went bankrupt and in 1909, a lease was signed with the then Department of Public Instruction and Fine Arts, to allocate the building to the National Museum of Natural History. In the following year, the building was used to house the Japanese Pavilion at the Universal Exhibition of Mexico, which was held as part of Mexico's celebrations of the centenary of Independence. It was at this time when the building was known as the Crystal Palace, due to its steel beams, columns, and windows, which resembled the 1851 structure in London, There is no record of any other activity carried on the premises until the December 1, 1913, when it opened as the National Museum of Natural History, whose founding collection came from the collection of Culture Museum, located in the City Centre, with sections in Botany, Zoology, Biology, Mineralogy and Geology. In 1926, the widow of Andrew Carnegie donated a Jurassic dinosaur, Diplodocus, to the museum, which defined the identity of the museum for decades.

In 1964, the museum was closed and the collections were transferred to other museums and university departments. After being abandoned for close to ten years, in 1973 UNAM began to rehabilitate the space; on 25 November 1975, the Chopo Museum was inaugurated. From 2004 to 2010, an update, expansion and renovation of the museum was done by UNAM and the architecture firm TEN Arquitectos. a

== Architecture and fittings ==
The original iron and glass building is in the Jugendstil-style. It measures 1,500 square metres (16,000 sq ft) in size with towers which rise 47 metres (154 ft). The varnished roof is of natural pine; it is treated with synthetic rubber for waterproofing.

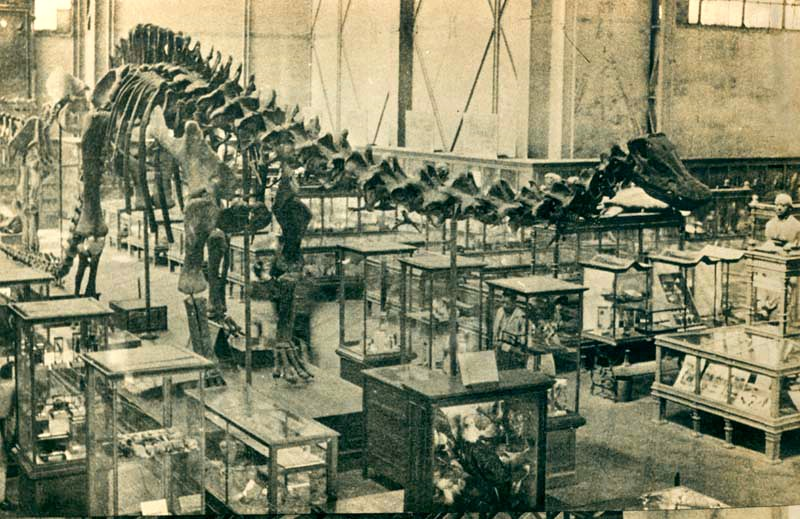
Diplodocus carnegie at the predecessor Museo Nacional de Historia Natural (1931)

== Exhibits ==
The museum offers exhibitions and performances, including contemporary music and dance, theater, film screenings and lectures. As of 2013, the museum's director is José Luis Paredes Pacho.
