= Gundolf Thoma =

German ski racer

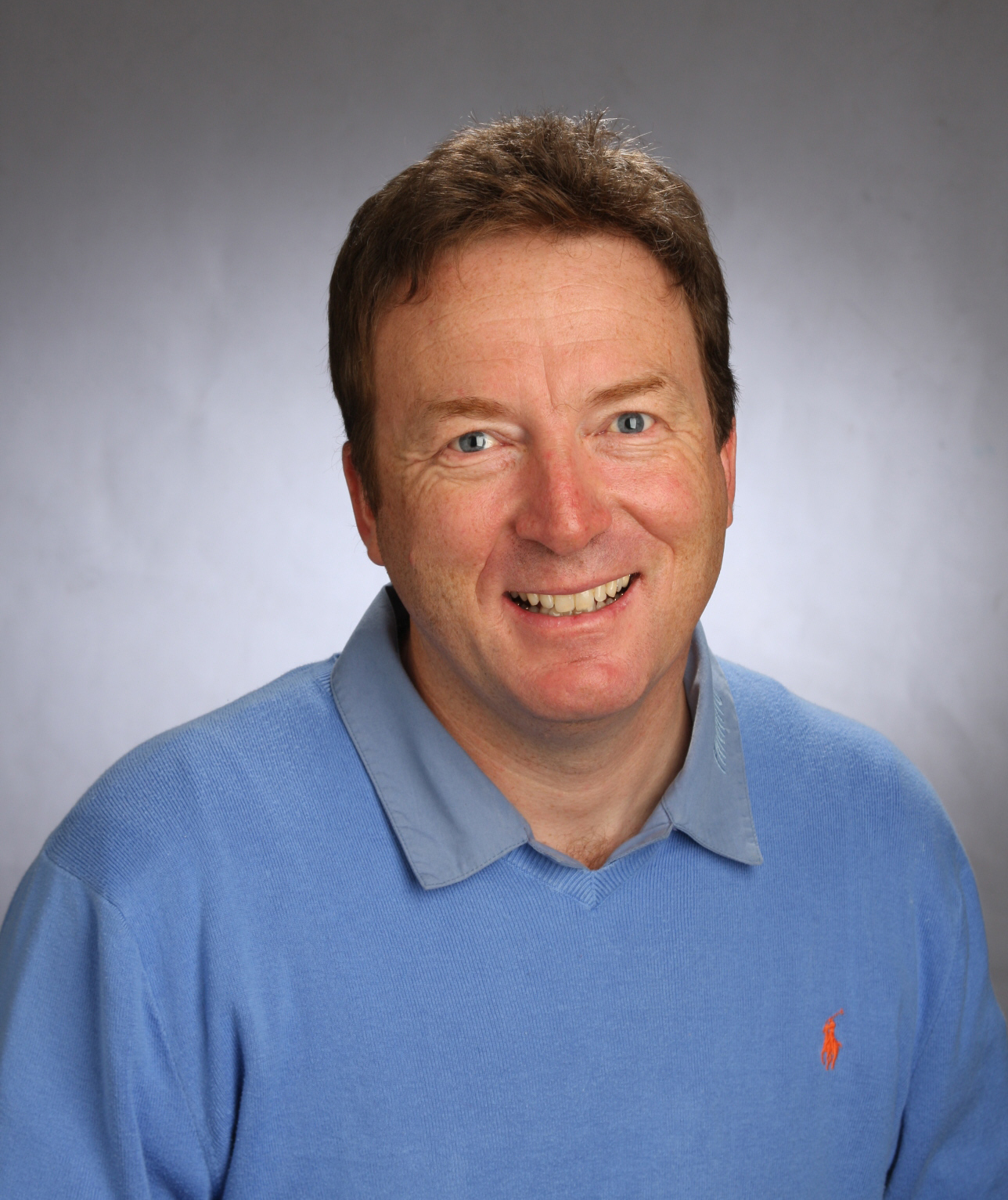
Portrait of Gundolf Thoma

Gundolf Thoma (born March 20, 1965, in Hinterzarten) is a former German ski racer and ski demonstrator in Japan.

== Life ==
Thoma was born the son of the ski instructor, Ottmar Thoma. The Olympic training center Freiburg-Black Forest was named after his uncle, Georg Thoma.

Gundolf Thoma successfully ski jumped until he was 12 years old but then decided to switch to alpine racing. Named the best Black Forest youth skier in 1983, he won the German youth slalom championship. From 1982 to 1990, Thoma was a member of various German national teams. In 1986-87 he was on the World Cup teams and placed 25th in Kitzbühel.

From 1986 to 1988 Thoma placed third in the German championships in slalom. Serious knee problems limited his successful career. Nevertheless, from 1985 to 1990, he won several international FIS races and twice finished fourth in the CISM World Championship.

Prior to the 1990–91 season, Thoma accepted an offer to compete in both the U.S. and Japanese Pro Ski Tours. The ski races, which had a sudden-death mano-a-mano format, were successful for Thoma and he became “Rookie of the Year” in Japan for the 1991 season. Thoma was injured in Schladming in the first race of the 1991-92 U.S. Pro Tour. He participated until 1993 in some professional ski races but his injuries essentially ended his career.

Thoma was a very respected ski demonstrator in Japan and served as the host of several successful ski shows for Japanese TV station Wowow before returning to his home in the Black Forest. There he took over the cross-country school his uncle Georg Thoma founded in Hinterzarten. He also founded other ski and snowboard schools in the Feldberg mountains of the Black Forest.

Thoma also served as a German sports ambassador. He served four years in the Black Forest and four years in Sonthofen.

Thoma is the inventor of the Carving Dual, a ski race designed to navigate buoys. It is a dual race, mano-a-mano format and does not use the traditional ski poles. This format is used in the FIS Carving Cup.

The Thoma family ski history is documented in the ski museum in Hinterzarten which was founded by his uncle.

In 1995, Thoma founded the winter sports school, Thoma on Seebuck, and in 2004, the Snow Sport Thoma located in Feldberg-Grafenmatt. Around 2000, Thoma developed a new teaching method known as “Ski in a Day by Gundi Thoma," designed to adapt to the fast-paced trend of the 2000s.

== Personal Information ==
In 1995, Thoma is married with two adult daughters. From 2008 to 2014, he served on the boards of several local ski clubs. Thoma is an honorary ambassador for the Federal Association of Children's Hospice
