= Maldita Vecindad y los Hijos del Quinto Patio =

Studio album by Maldita Vecindad
- Released: October 26, 1989
- Genre: Rock en español, ska
- Label: RCA International

Maldita Vecindad chronology
Maldita Vecindad y los Hijos del Quinto Patio (1989)	El Circo (1991)

Professional ratings
Review scores
Source	Rating
Allmusic	link

Maldita Vecindad y los Hijos del Quinto Patio is the self-titled debut album recorded by the band Maldita Vecindad from Mexico City. The ska-induced long play was released on October 26, 1989, under the RCA International label.

== Track listing ==
1. Apañón
2. Rafael
3. Morenaza
4. Mujer
5. Mojado
6. Bailando
7. Apariencias
8. El Supermercado
