= List of top-ten songs for the 1940s in Mexico =

This is a list of the 10 most popular songs in Mexico for each year between 1940 and 1949, as published in the book "El Sound Track de la vida cotidiana", by Fernando Mejía Barquera.

The following year-end charts were elaborated by Mejía Barquera, based on weekly charts that were published on the magazines Radiolandia for the years 1944 to 1946 and Selecciones musicales for 1948 and 1949 (the latter were taken from Roberto Ayala's 1962 book "Musicosas: manual del comentarista de radio y televisión" which compiled the Selecciones musicales weekly charts from 1948 to 1960; those charts were, according to Ayala, based on record sales, jukebox plays, radio and television airplay, and sheet music sales (Note: (Translated from Spanish) "Record agencies all over the country, jukebox operators, music publishers, recording houses and correspondents for Selecciones Musicales send local reports every week. In the headquarters, each one of those reports is assessed and by means of a scoreboard each song is rated so as to determine the position that it is to occupy on the "Hit Parade".)). Mejía Barquera then took one chart from the second week of every month of a calendar year, so as to have twelve charts per year, and assigned "points" to the songs on those charts based on their ranking (from 10 points for a first place to 1 point for a tenth place), adding up the points to make his year-end charts.

The charts published by Selecciones Musicales and compiled in the Musicosas book only include the song titles and the names of the composers; the performers credited in this article are included for reference and where many performers are listed for the same song, the performers appear in alphabetical order, which may not reflect whose version was the most popular (Note: While many times, like in other countries, a song would be popularized by one particular performer and it became identified with them, in the 1940s and 50s it was common practice in Mexico for a song to be recorded by various singers from different record labels around the same time; therefore, this article may not include all of the performers who recorded the songs around that period.).

== 1944 ==
No.	Title	Songwriter(s)	Artist(s)
1	"Hoja seca"	Roque Carbajo	Salvador García
2	"Toda una vida"	Oswaldo Farrés	Julio Flores
3	"Amar y vivir"	Consuelo Velázquez	Fernando Fernández
4	"Canción mexicana"	Lalo Guerrero	Lucha Reyes
5	"Vive como quieras"	Antonio Núñez	Aurora Núñez
6	"Noche"	Gabriel Ruiz & Ricardo López Méndez	María Luisa Landín
7	"Cartas marcadas"	Chucho Monge	Hermanas Padilla / Trío Calaveras / Various artists
8	"Dos almas"	Miguel Prado & Ernesto Cortázar	Various artists
9	"El herradero"	Pedro Galindo	Lucha Reyes
10	"Conozco a los dos"	Pablo Valdés Hernández	Hermanas Hernández / María Luisa Landín / Various artists
10 A (Note: Mejía Barquera includes eleven songs for his 1944 year-end chart, instead of the ten songs that are listed for other years.)	"La tequilera"	Alfredo D'Orsay	Lucha Reyes

== 1945 ==
No.	Title	Songwriter(s)	Artist(s)
1	"Hilos de plata"	Alberto Domínguez	Las Hermanas Águila
2	"Palabras de mujer"	Agustín Lara	Fernando Fernández / Toña la Negra / Pedro Vargas
3	"Como el besar" (Note: Usually abbreviated to "Besar".)	Juan Bruno Tarraza	Roberto Espí & Conjunto Casino [es] / Various artists
4	"¿Por qué eres así?"	Teddy Fregoso	Various artists
5	"Pelea de gallos"	Juan S. Garrido	Various artists
6	"Noche azul"	Agustín Lara	Various artists
7	"Cuando quiere un mexicano"	Manuel Esperón	Jorge Negrete
8	"Un gran amor"	Gonzalo Curiel	Various artists
9	"Somos diferentes"	Pablo Beltrán Ruiz	Nestor Mesta Chayres
10	"Volvamos a empezar"	Miguel Angel Valladares	Various artists

== 1946 ==
No.	Title	Songwriter(s)	Artist(s)
1	"Ahora y siempre"	José de Jesús Morales	Various artists
2	"Humo en los ojos"	Agustín Lara	Mario Alberto Rodríguez / Various artists
3	"Traicionera"	Gonzalo Curiel	Fernando Fernández
4	"Triste pensamiento"	Chucho Rodríguez	Various artists
5	"Juntos"	Alberto Domínguez	Eduardo Alexander / Various artists
6	"La barca de oro"	Abundio Martínez	Hermanas Padilla / Various artists
7	"De corazón a corazón"	Gabriel Ruiz & Ricardo López Méndez	Hermanas Padilla / Various artists
8	"Esta noche ha pasado"	Manuel Sabre Marroquín	Various artists
9	"Lágrimas de sangre"	Agustín Lara	Toña la Negra / Various artists
10	"Nochecita"	Víctor Huesca	Eduardo Alexander / Various artists
10 A (Note: Mejía Barquera includes eleven songs for his 1946 year-end chart, instead of the ten songs that are listed for other years.)	"La Raspa"	Public domain	Various artists

== 1948 ==
For the monthly charts of 1948, see: List of top-ten songs in 1948 and 1949 (Mexico)

No.	Title	Songwriter(s)	Artist(s)
1	"Verdad amarga"	Consuelo Velázquez	María Luisa Landín / Various artists
2	"¿Por qué has tardado tanto?"	Carlos Gómez Barrera	Various artists
3	"La rondalla"	Alfonso Esparza Oteo	Luis Aguilar / Luis Pérez Meza
4	"Madrid"	Agustín Lara	Ana María González
5	"Me acuerdo de ti"	Gonzalo Curiel	Various artists
6	"¿Hasta cuándo, mi vida?"	Chucho Rodríguez	Various artists
7	"Convencida"	Abel Domínguez	Various artists
8	"Dos gardenias"	Isolina Carrillo	Daniel Santos con Sonora Matancera / Avelina Landín
9	"Arrullo de mar"	Salvador Rangel	Various artists
10	"Un poquito de tu amor"	Julio Gutiérrez	Ana María González / Various artists

== 1949 ==
For the monthly charts of 1949, see: List of top-ten songs in 1948 and 1949 (Mexico)

No.	Title	Songwriter(s)	Artist(s)
1	"Sin ti"	Pepe Guízar	Trío Los Panchos
2	"Bonita"	Luis Arcaraz	Luis Arcaraz y su Orquesta
3	"La rondalla"	Alfonso Esparza Oteo	Luis Aguilar / Luis Pérez Meza
4	"Amorcito corazón"	Manuel Esperón & Pedro de Urdimalas	Pedro Infante / Trío Los Panchos
5	"Tú, solo tú"	Felipe Valdés Leal	Dueto Azteca / Pedro Infante / Beny Moré / Trío Calaveras
6	"Malos pensamientos"	Alberto Domínguez	María Luisa Landín / Chelo Silva
7	"Mi corazón abrió la puerta"	Gabriel Ruiz	Various artists
8	"Falsos juramentos"	Carlos Gómez Barrera	Pedro Vargas
9	"Verdad amarga"	Consuelo Velázquez	María Luisa Landín / Various artists
10	"El abandonado"	Public domain	Miguel Aceves Mejía / Luis Pérez Meza / Trío Aztlán
