= List of top-ten songs in 1948 and 1949 (Mexico) =

These are the monthly charts of the top-ten most popular songs in Mexico between September 1948 and December 1949 according to the magazine Selecciones Musicales and as compiled in the book Musicosas: manual del comentarista de radio y televisión by Roberto Ayala. These charts were based on record sales, jukebox plays, radio and television airplay, and sheet music sales. (Note: (Translated from Spanish) "Record agencies all over the country, jukebox operators, music publishers, recording houses and correspondents for Selecciones Musicales send local reports every week. In the headquarters, each one of those reports is assessed and by means of a scoreboard each song is rated so as to determine the position that it is to occupy on the "Hit Parade".)

As published in the Musicosas book, the charts only include the song titles and the names of the composers; the performers credited in this article are included for reference and where many performers are listed for the same song, they appear in alphabetical order, which may not reflect whose version was the most popular (Note: While many times, like in other countries, a song would be popularized by one particular performer and it became identified with them, in Mexico it was common practice in the 1940s and 50s for a song to be recorded by various singers from different record labels around the same time; therefore, this article may not include all of the performers who recorded the songs around that period.).

== 1948 ==
=== September ===
No.	Title	Songwriter(s)	Artist(s)
1	"Madrid"	Agustín Lara	Ana María González
2	"¿Hasta cuándo, mi vida?"	Chucho Rodríguez	Blanca Estela Pavón
3	"Me acuerdo de ti"	Gonzalo Curiel	Fernando Fernández / Elvira Ríos
4	"Verdad amarga"	Consuelo Velázquez	María Luisa Landín
5	"¿Tú donde estás?"	Gabriel Ruiz	Avelina Landín
6	"Aunque pasen los años"	Eduardo Alarcón Leal (Note: The Selecciones Musicales chart incorrectly credits Felipe Valdés Leal as the composer; the mistake was corrected when the song reappeared on the January 1949 chart.)	Alarcón Leal y La Tamaulipeca / Jorge Negrete
7	"¿Por qué has tardado?"	Carlos Gómez Barrera	Various artists
8	"Sombras"	Agustín Lara	Eva Garza / Pedro Vargas
9	"Ya nada soy"	Gonzalo Curiel	Fernando Fernández
10	"¿Qué te parece?"	Julio Gutiérrez	Vicentico Valdés

Source: Ayala, R. (1962) Musicosas: manual del comentarista de radio y televisión. Page 299.

=== October ===
No.	Title	Songwriter(s)	Artist(s)
1	"Madrid"	Agustín Lara	Ana María González
2	"Verdad amarga"	Consuelo Velázquez	María Luisa Landín
3	"¿Hasta cuándo, mi vida?"	Chucho Rodríguez	Blanca Estela Pavón
4	"Me acuerdo de ti"	Gonzalo Curiel	Fernando Fernández / Elvira Ríos
5	"La rondalla"	Alfonso Esparza Oteo	Luis Aguilar / Luis Pérez Meza
6	"¿Por qué has tardado?"	Carlos Gómez Barrera	Various artists
7	"Dos gardenias"	Isolina Carrillo	Avelina Landín / Daniel Santos con Sonora Matancera
8	"Convencida"	Abel Domínguez	Hermanas Águila / Johnny Albino y el Trío San Juan
9	"Al arrullo del mar" (Note: Listed in the Selecciones Musicales chart as "Arrullo de mar".)	Salvador Rangel	Hermanas Águila
10	"Qué me importa"	Mario Fernández Porta	Leo Marini

Source: Ayala, R. (1962) Musicosas: manual del comentarista de radio y televisión. Page 299.

=== November ===
For unknown reasons, the Selecciones Musicales chart for this month doesn't include the seventh position.

No.	Title	Songwriter(s)	Artist(s)
1	"Verdad amarga"	Consuelo Velázquez	María Luisa Landín
2	"La rondalla"	Alfonso Esparza Oteo	Luis Aguilar / Luis Pérez Meza
3	"¿Por qué has tardado?"	Carlos Gómez Barrera	Various artists
4	"Dos gardenias"	Isolina Carrillo	Avelina Landín / Daniel Santos con Sonora Matancera
5	"Convencida"	Abel Domínguez	Hermanas Águila / Johnny Albino y el Trío San Juan
6	"Al arrullo del mar"	Salvador Rangel	Hermanas Águila
8	"La embarcación"	Public domain (Note: Although the composer of this traditional ranchera song is unknown, the Selecciones Musicales chart and contemporary record releases credit Miguel Aceves Mejía as the arranger.)	Miguel Aceves Mejía / Dueto Azteca / Hermanas López
9	"¿Hasta cuándo, mi vida?"	Chucho Rodríguez	Blanca Estela Pavón
10	"Madrid"	Agustín Lara	Ana María González

Source: Ayala, R. (1962) Musicosas: manual del comentarista de radio y televisión. Pages 299 and 300.

=== December ===
No.	Title	Songwriter(s)	Artist(s)
1	"La rondalla"	Alfonso Esparza Oteo	Luis Aguilar / Luis Pérez Meza
2	"¿Por qué has tardado?"	Carlos Gómez Barrera	Various artists
3	"Convencida"	Abel Domínguez	Hermanas Águila / Johnny Albino y el Trío San Juan
4	"Un poquito de tu amor"	Julio Gutiérrez	Ana María González / Pedro Vargas
5	"Mi todo"	Alfredo Parra	Julio Flores / María Luisa Landín / Luis Lozano / Eduardo Solís
6	"Dos gardenias"	Isolina Carrillo	Avelina Landín / Daniel Santos con Sonora Matancera
7	"Nuestra cita"	Arturo Núñez	Los Trovadores de México / Kiko Mendive / Trío Los Jaibos
8	"Al arrullo del mar"	Salvador Rangel	Hermanas Águila
9	"Qué me importa"	Mario Fernández Porta	Leo Marini
10	"Poquito poquito"	Delía Gasque	Various artists

Source: Ayala, R. (1962) Musicosas: manual del comentarista de radio y televisión. Page 300.

== 1949 ==
=== January ===
No.	Title	Songwriter(s)	Artist(s)
1	"La rondalla"	Alfonso Esparza Oteo	Luis Aguilar / Luis Pérez Meza
2	"Verdad amarga"	Consuelo Velázquez	María Luisa Landín
3	"Al arrullo del mar"	Salvador Rangel	Hermanas Águila
4	"Bonita"	Luis Arcaraz	Luis Arcaraz y su Orquesta
5	"¿Por qué has tardado?"	Carlos Gómez Barrera	Various artists
6	"Dos gardenias"	Isolina Carrillo	Avelina Landín / Daniel Santos con Sonora Matancera
7	"Sin ti"	Pepe Guízar	Trío Los Panchos
8	"Mi todo"	Alfredo Parra	Julio Flores / María Luisa Landín / Luis Lozano / Eduardo Solís
9	"Aunque pasen los años"	Eduardo Alarcón Leal	Alarcón Leal y La Tamaulipeca / Jorge Negrete
10	"Bendita tú"	Manuel Sabre Marroquín (Note: Although the Selecciones Musicales chart appears to credit his sibling José Sabre Marroquín as the composer, the Society of Authors and Composers of Mexico (Sociedad de Autores y Compositores de México) credits Manuel Sabre Marroquín as the composer.)	Panchito Rodríguez

Source: Ayala, R. (1962) Musicosas: manual del comentarista de radio y televisión. Page 300.

=== February ===
No.	Title	Songwriter(s)	Artist(s)
1	"La rondalla"	Alfonso Esparza Oteo	Luis Aguilar / Luis Pérez Meza
2	"Sin ti"	Pepe Guízar	Trío Los Panchos
3	"Verdad amarga"	Consuelo Velázquez	María Luisa Landín
4	"Al arrullo del mar"	Salvador Rangel	Hermanas Águila
5	"Malos pensamientos"	Alberto Domínguez	Maria Luisa Landín / Chelo Silva
6	"¿Por qué has tardado?"	Carlos Gómez Barrera	Various artists
7	"Bonita"	Luis Arcaraz	Luis Arcaraz y su Orquesta
8	"Convencida"	Abel Domínguez	Hermanas Águila / Johnny Albino y el Trío San Juan
9	"El abandonado"	Public domain	Miguel Aceves Mejía / Jorge Negrete / Luis Pérez Meza / Trío Aztlán
10	"Dos gardenias"	Isolina Carrillo	Avelina Landín / Daniel Santos con Sonora Matancera

Source: Ayala, R. (1962) Musicosas: manual del comentarista de radio y televisión. Page 300.

=== March ===
No.	Title	Songwriter(s)	Artist(s)
1	"La rondalla"	Alfonso Esparza Oteo	Luis Aguilar / Luis Pérez Meza
2	"Malos pensamientos"	Alberto Domínguez	Maria Luisa Landín / Chelo Silva
3	"Bonita"	Luis Arcaraz	Luis Arcaraz y su Orquesta
4	"Al arrullo del mar"	Salvador Rangel	Hermanas Águila
5	"Falsos juramentos"	Carlos Gómez Barrera	Pedro Vargas
6	"Sin ti"	Pepe Guízar	Trío Los Panchos
7	"Triste verdad"	Mario Ruiz Armengol	Balde González / María Luisa Landín / Blanca Estela Pavón / Elvira Ríos
8	"El abandonado"	Public domain	Miguel Aceves Mejía / Jorge Negrete / Luis Pérez Meza / Trío Aztlán
9	"Convencida"	Abel Domínguez	Hermanas Águila / Johnny Albino y el Trío San Juan
10	"Aunque pasen los años"	Eduardo Alarcón Leal	Alarcón Leal y La Tamaulipeca / Jorge Negrete

Source: Ayala, R. (1962) Musicosas: manual del comentarista de radio y televisión. Pages 300 and 301.

=== April ===
No.	Title	Songwriter(s)	Artist(s)
1	"Bonita"	Luis Arcaraz	Luis Arcaraz y su Orquesta
2	"No me quieras tanto"	Rafael Hernández	Trío Los Panchos
3	"Sin ti"	Pepe Guízar	Trío Los Panchos
4	"Al arrullo del mar"	Salvador Rangel	Hermanas Águila
5	"¿Tú donde estás?"	Gabriel Ruiz	Avelina Landín
6	"Si regresara el amor"	Alfredo Núñez de Borbón	Trío Guayacán
7	"Falsos juramentos"	Carlos Gómez Barrera	Pedro Vargas
8	"Malos pensamientos"	Alberto Domínguez	Maria Luisa Landín / Chelo Silva
9	"Mi corazón abrió la puerta"	Gabriel Ruiz	Various artists (Note: There is a popular recording of this song by Los Tres Diamantes, but it's from 1950, a year after this chart was published.)
10	"La rondalla"	Alfonso Esparza Oteo	Luis Aguilar / Luis Pérez Meza

Source: Ayala, R. (1962) Musicosas: manual del comentarista de radio y televisión. Page 301.

=== May ===
No.	Title	Songwriter(s)	Artist(s)
1	"Sin ti"	Pepe Guízar	Trío Los Panchos
2	"Bonita"	Luis Arcaraz	Luis Arcaraz y su Orquesta
3	"La rondalla"	Alfonso Esparza Oteo	Luis Aguilar / Luis Pérez Meza
4	"Malos pensamientos"	Alberto Domínguez	Maria Luisa Landín / Chelo Silva
5	"Un poquito de tu amor"	Julio Gutiérrez	Ana María González / Pedro Vargas
6	"Si regresara el amor"	Alfredo Núñez de Borbón	Trío Guayacán
7	"¿Tú donde estás?"	Gabriel Ruiz	Avelina Landín
8	"Verdad amarga"	Consuelo Velázquez	María Luisa Landín
9	"Falsos juramentos"	Carlos Gómez Barrera	Pedro Vargas
10	"Mi corazón abrió la puerta"	Gabriel Ruiz	Various artists

Source: Ayala, R. (1962) Musicosas: manual del comentarista de radio y televisión. Page 301.

=== June ===
No.	Title	Songwriter(s)	Artist(s)
1	"Sin ti"	Pepe Guízar	Trío Los Panchos
2	"Bonita"	Luis Arcaraz	Luis Arcaraz y su Orquesta
3	"Malos pensamientos"	Alberto Domínguez	Maria Luisa Landín / Chelo Silva
4	"Mi corazón abrió la puerta"	Gabriel Ruiz	Various artists
5	"Falsos juramentos"	Carlos Gómez Barrera	Pedro Vargas
6	"Al arrullo del mar"	Salvador Rangel	Hermanas Águila
7	"Triste verdad"	Mario Ruiz Armengol	Balde González / María Luisa Landín / Blanca Estela Pavón / Elvira Ríos
8	"No me quieras tanto"	Rafael Hernández	Trío Los Panchos
9	"La rondalla"	Alfonso Esparza Oteo	Luis Aguilar / Luis Pérez Meza
10	"El abandonado"	Public domain	Miguel Aceves Mejía / Jorge Negrete / Luis Pérez Meza / Trío Aztlán

Source: Ayala, R. (1962) Musicosas: manual del comentarista de radio y televisión. Pages 301 and 302.

=== July ===
No.	Title	Songwriter(s)	Artist(s)
1	"Amorcito corazón"	Manuel Esperón (music) & Pedro de Urdimalas (lyrics)	Pedro Infante / Trío Los Panchos
2	"Sin ti"	Pepe Guízar	Trío Los Panchos
3	"Bonita"	Luis Arcaraz	Luis Arcaraz y su Orquesta
4	"Si regresara el amor"	Alfredo Núñez de Borbón	Trío Guayacán
5	"Mi corazón abrió la puerta"	Gabriel Ruiz	Various artists
6	"Malos pensamientos"	Alberto Domínguez	Maria Luisa Landín / Chelo Silva
7	"Falsos juramentos"	Carlos Gómez Barrera	Pedro Vargas
8	"No me quieras tanto"	Rafael Hernández	Trío Los Panchos
9	"Caminemos"	Alfredo Gil	Trío Los Panchos
10	"Muchachita"	Mario Ruiz Armengol	Andy Russell

Source: Ayala, R. (1962) Musicosas: manual del comentarista de radio y televisión. Page 302.

=== August ===
No.	Title	Songwriter(s)	Artist(s)
1	"Amorcito corazón"	Manuel Esperón (music) & Pedro de Urdimalas (lyrics)	Pedro Infante / Trío Los Panchos
2	"Sin ti"	Pepe Guízar	Trío Los Panchos
3	"No me quieras tanto"	Rafael Hernández	Trío Los Panchos
4	"Mi corazón abrió la puerta"	Gabriel Ruiz	Various artists
5	"Bonita"	Luis Arcaraz	Luis Arcaraz y su Orquesta
6	"La rondalla"	Alfonso Esparza Oteo	Luis Aguilar / Luis Pérez Meza
7	"Falsos juramentos"	Carlos Gómez Barrera	Pedro Vargas
8	"El abandonado"	Public domain	Miguel Aceves Mejía / Jorge Negrete / Luis Pérez Meza / Trío Aztlán
9	"Muchachita"	Mario Ruiz Armengol	Andy Russell
10	"¿Tú donde estás?"	Gabriel Ruiz	Avelina Landín

Source: Ayala, R. (1962) Musicosas: manual del comentarista de radio y televisión. Page 302.

=== September ===
No.	Title	Songwriter(s)	Artist(s)
1	"Amorcito corazón"	Manuel Esperón (music) & Pedro de Urdimalas (lyrics)	Pedro Infante / Trío Los Panchos
2	"Tú, sólo tú"	Felipe Valdés Leal	Dueto Azteca / Pedro Infante / Beny Moré / Trío Calaveras
3	"Sin ti"	Pepe Guízar	Trío Los Panchos
4	"Miseria"	Miguel Ángel Valladares	Eva Garza / María Luisa Landín / Pedro Vargas / Rubén Reyes / Trío Los Panchos
5	"No me quieras tanto"	Rafael Hernández	Trío Los Panchos
6	"Mi corazón abrió la puerta"	Gabriel Ruiz	Various artists
7	"Bonita"	Luis Arcaraz	Luis Arcaraz y su Orquesta
8	"La rondalla"	Alfonso Esparza Oteo	Luis Aguilar / Luis Pérez Meza
9	"Falsos juramentos"	Carlos Gómez Barrera	Pedro Vargas
10	"El abandonado"	Public domain	Miguel Aceves Mejía / Jorge Negrete / Luis Pérez Meza / Trío Aztlán

Source: Ayala, R. (1962) Musicosas: manual del comentarista de radio y televisión. Page 302.

=== October ===
No.	Title	Songwriter(s)	Artist(s)
1	"Tú, sólo tú"	Felipe Valdés Leal	Dueto Azteca / Pedro Infante / Beny Moré / Trío Calaveras
2	"Miseria"	Miguel Ángel Valladares	Eva Garza / María Luisa Landín / Pedro Vargas / Rubén Reyes / Trío Los Panchos
3	"Amorcito corazón"	Manuel Esperón (music) & Pedro de Urdimalas (lyrics)	Pedro Infante / Trío Los Panchos
4	"Vacío"	José de Jesús Morales	Rosita Fernández / Trío Cantarrecio (Note: There's a recording by Los Tecolines which is from 1952 or later.)
5	"La Vie en rose"	Louiguy (music) & Édith Piaf (lyrics) (Note: The Selecciones Music chart only credits Piaf as the composer.)	Édith Piaf
6	"Sin ti"	Pepe Guízar	Trío Los Panchos
7	"Bonita"	Luis Arcaraz	Luis Arcaraz y su Orquesta
8	"Mi corazón abrió la puerta"	Gabriel Ruiz	Various artists
9	"La rondalla"	Alfonso Esparza Oteo	Luis Aguilar / Luis Pérez Meza
10	"El abandonado"	Public domain	Miguel Aceves Mejía / Jorge Negrete / Luis Pérez Meza / Trío Aztlán

Source: Ayala, R. (1962) Musicosas: manual del comentarista de radio y televisión. Pages 302 and 303.

=== November ===
For unknown reasons, the Selecciones Musicales chart for this month doesn't include the fourth position.

No.	Title	Songwriter(s)	Artist(s)
1	"Tú, sólo tú"	Felipe Valdés Leal	Dueto Azteca / Pedro Infante / Beny Moré / Trío Calaveras
2	"La Vie en rose"	Louiguy (music) & Édith Piaf (lyrics)	Édith Piaf
3	"El abandonado"	Public domain	Miguel Aceves Mejía / Jorge Negrete / Luis Pérez Meza / Trío Aztlán
5	"Amorcito corazón"	Manuel Esperón (music) & Pedro de Urdimalas (lyrics)	Pedro Infante / Trío Los Panchos
6	"Vacío"	José de Jesús Morales	Rosita Fernández / Trío Cantarrecio
7	"Sin ti"	Pepe Guízar	Trío Los Panchos
8	"Bonita"	Luis Arcaraz	Luis Arcaraz y su Orquesta
9	"Mi corazón abrió la puerta"	Gabriel Ruiz	Various artists
10	"La rondalla"	Alfonso Esparza Oteo	Luis Aguilar / Luis Pérez Meza

Source: Ayala, R. (1962) Musicosas: manual del comentarista de radio y televisión. Page 303.

=== December ===
No.	Title	Songwriter(s)	Artist(s)
1	"Tú, sólo tú"	Felipe Valdés Leal	Dueto Azteca / Pedro Infante / Beny Moré / Trío Calaveras
2	"La múcura"	Antonio Fuentes	Beny Moré / Trío Los Panchos
3	"La Vie en rose"	Louiguy (music) & Édith Piaf (lyrics)	Édith Piaf
4	"El abandonado"	Public domain	Miguel Aceves Mejía / Jorge Negrete / Luis Pérez Meza / Trío Aztlán
5	"Jinetes en el cielo"	Stan Jones	Pedro Vargas
6	"Amorcito corazón"	Manuel Esperón (music) & Pedro de Urdimalas (lyrics)	Pedro Infante / Trío Los Panchos
7	"Bonita"	Luis Arcaraz	Luis Arcaraz y su Orquesta
8	"La rondalla"	Alfonso Esparza Oteo	Luis Aguilar / Luis Pérez Meza
9	"Sin ti"	Pepe Guízar	Trío Los Panchos
10	"Miseria"	Miguel Ángel Valladares	Eva Garza / María Luisa Landín / Pedro Vargas / Rubén Reyes / Trío Los Panchos

Source: Ayala, R. (1962) Musicosas: manual del comentarista de radio y televisión. Page 303.
