= The Second Woman (1953 film) =

1953 film by José Díaz Morales

- Directed by: José Díaz Morales
- Written by: Max Aub; José Díaz Morales; Mauricio Magdaleno; Carlos Sampelayo
- Produced by: Alfonso Rosas Priego
- Starring: Rosa Carmina; Antonio Aguilar
- Cinematography: Ezequiel Carrasco
- Edited by: Alfredo Rosas Priego
- Music by: Antonio Díaz Conde
- Production company: Producciones Rosas Priego
- Distributed by: Clasa-Mohme
- Release date: 2 September 1953
- Running time: 90 minutes
- Country: Mexico
- Language: Spanish

The Second Woman (Spanish: La segunda mujer) is a 1953 Mexican drama film directed by José Díaz Morales and starring Rosa Carmina, Antonio Aguilar, with the musical participation of La Torcacita, and the cuban singer, composer and musician Isolina Carrillo. The film's sets were designed by the art director Ramón Rodríguez Granada.

== Plot ==
A couple with preteen children breaks up. The husband (played by Antonio Aguilar) meets a new woman and they marry. As the children grow up, the film analyzes the impact of their parents' separation on their lives.

== Cast ==
- Rosa Carmina as Victoria
- Antonio "Tony" Aguilar as Rodolfo Salazar
- Freddy Fernández as Rudy, joven
- Liliana Durán as Rosaura
- Dagoberto Rodríguez as Gabriel Ramírez
- Gloria Alonso as Ana María, joven
- José Loza as Ramón, joven
- Conchita Gentil Arcos as Juliana
- Javier de la Parra as Florido
- Rosalía Julián as Mirta
- Fernando Luján as Rudy, niño
- Alejandro Ciangherotti as Ramón, niño
- María Eugenia Llamas as Ana María, niña
- Fernando Soto "Mantequilla" as Panfilo
- La Torcacita as Cantante
- Isolina Carrillo
- Hermanos Torres Alba
- Mariachi Perla de Occidente
- Armando Acosta as Invitado a baile
- Rodolfo Calvo as Detective policía
- Manuel Casanueva as Detective policía
- Jesús Gómez as Policía
- Miguel Ángel López as Jorge
- Álvaro Matute as Chava, amante de Rosaura
- Salvador Quiroz as Señor Rodríguez

== Bibliography ==
- Pedro López García. Alicantinos en el cine. Cineastas en Alicante. Editorial Club Universitario, 2013.
