= Felipe Valdés Leal =

- Born: August 6, 1899; Saltillo, Mexico
- Died: August 17, 1988 (aged 89) Cuernavaca, Morelos, Mexico
- Genres: Ranchera
- Occupations: Composer, lyricist, artistic director
- Instrument: harmonica
- Years active: 1923–1974
- Labels: Brunswick Records; CBS Records

Felipe Valdés Leal (August 6, 1899 – August 17, 1988) was a Mexican composer, lyricist, and artistic director. Valdés Leal grew up enjoying ranchera music and in 1923, he relocated to Los Angeles, California to pursue a career in music. He worked at a record store, where he would engage in humming and whistling, subsequently transcribing lyrical content to accompany them. His first successful compositions were the whimsical track "Échale un Quinto al Piano" and "Lucio Vázquez", a recording that garnered particular acclaim among the Latino community. By 1925, Valdés Leal became the artistic director at Brunswick Records, a pivotal role he played in catapulting the careers of Javier Solís, Irma Serrano, Los Panchos, and Los Alegres de Terán. In 1947, he became the artistic director for CBS Records.

Valdés Leal became one of the greatest ranchera composers. During the 1950s, ranchera music became the most popular Latin music genre in the United States, catalyzed by the success of Valdés Leal, José Alfredo Jiménez, and Vicente Fernández. On April 26, 2001, the Sociedad General de Escritores de México unveiled a commemorative plaque and a bust of Valdes Leal. On February 6, 2015, the National Sound Archive of Mexico accessed a collection of 1,419 sound recordings written by Valdés Leal for the purposes of collection, preservation, and conservation.

== Career ==
=== Early career: 1899–1942 ===
Felipe Valdés Leal was born on August 6, 1899, in Saltillo, Coahuila, Mexico. He was the son of José Ventura Valdés and Carmen Leal. He grew up enjoying ranchera music, which he constantly heard the field workers singing and whistling. He began writing verses at the age of seven. His father taught him to play the harmonica. He worked as a bureaucrat in the Palacio de Gobierno, and in 1923, he moved to Los Angeles, California, to work at a record store. Lacking musical knowledge, he contented himself with humming and whistling, and during one of these moments, he composed his first song, "Échale un Quinto al Piano", a humorous-themed song that became commercially successful internationally. Valdés Leal wrote the corrido "Lucio Vázquez", also known as "Los Pavos Reales", which became one of the most popular recordings among Latinos.

By 1925, Valdés Leal became the artistic director at Brunswick Records in Los Angeles. He played a significant role in promoting ranchera music by discovering and supporting artists such as Javier Solís, Irma Serrano, Los Panchos (whom he brought to Mexico directly from New York), Las Hermanas Huerta, Los Alegres de Terán, and Las Hermanas Padilla. In addition to his work at the record company, Valdés Leal continued his music production, often collaborating with other various composers. Songs written by Valdés Leal have been covered by various artists including, Lucha Reyes, Matilde Sánchez, Amalia Mendoza, María de Lourdes, Lola Beltrán, Lucha Villa, Dora María, Flor Silvestre, Enriqueta Jiménez, Irma Serrano, Verónica Loyo, Pedro Infante, Jorge Negrete, Javier Solís, Miguel Aceves Mejía, Vicente Fernández, Pedro Vargas, Avitia, Antonio Aguilar, Luis Pérez Meza, Luis Aguilar, Las Hermanas Padilla, Las Hermanas Huerta, Las Hermanas Águila, Los Hermanos Záizar, and Los Alegres de Terán. Valdés Leal often incorporated the harmonica in his compositions.

=== Retirement and return to music: 1943–1974 ===
In 1943, Valdés Leal returned to Mexico and settled in Mexico City with his wife and two children. In 1947, he became the artistic director at CBS Records in Mexico, where he remained for 25 years. An all-star tribute for Valdés Leal was broadcast on the Siempre en Domingo show hosted by Raúl Velasco, as well as on the México, Magia y Encuentro show.

In 1949, Valdés Leal wrote "Tú Sólo Tú". In 1950, while gathered with fellow farmers in a field, Hilario Semersky, a farmer, was drinking and singing "Tú Sólo Tú". This led Aniceto Sanchez, another farmer, to fatally shoot Semersky just a short distance from his own home. In 1995, Selena recorded a rendition of "Tú Sólo Tú" which was originally intended for the soundtrack to the movie Don Juan DeMarco (1995) but was shelved by the film's music producers. It was later included in Selena's Dreaming of You (1995) album following her shooting death several months earlier. The track "became wildly popular" following its release, it peaked at number one on the United States Billboard Hot Latin Songs chart, remaining atop the chart for ten consecutive weeks. Selena's version received a platinum certification from the Recording Industry Association of America (RIAA), which denotes 60,000 units consisting of sales and on-demand streaming in the United States. Valdés Leal wrote "Por Qué Negar" and "Qué Te Importa" for Javier Solís' debut album, the recording reached platinum sales in 1957.

In 1974, Valdés Leal retired and went to live with his family in Cuernavaca, Morelos, Mexico, where he spent his final years until he died on August 17, 1988. He buried in the Cemetery of Chipitlán.

== Legacy and impact ==
Valdés Leal often composed songs primarily revolving around male perspectives that emphasized a male-centered narrative in his writing. He often recorded ranchera songs, a genre that tends to idealize and establish a typical gender dynamic between male and female partners, often portraying the male as the initiator or suitor, while the female character typically takes on a passive role as the desired object. Bob Schwartz wrote in the Los Angeles Times that Valdés Leal's lyrical compositions often delved into lost love and an emotive yearning for one's homeland.

In the late 1940s, the subsequent dissemination of anti-Soviet propaganda across Yugoslavia led to a shift in public sentiment away from Soviet cinema. As early as 1949, reports indicated that Soviet Russia drastically reduced its imports to Yugoslavia, almost to a standstill. Consequently, Mexican cinema began to gain increasing popularity. Slavko Perovic played a pivotal role in adapting Mexican songs from these films to resonate with the Yugoslavian audience. Perovic achieved this by making alterations to the lyrics. In the original lyrics of Valdés Leal's "Entre Copa y Copa" which began with "With each additional drink my life ends/Crying drunk over your lost love", Perovic's version omitted the reference to excessive drinking and instead commenced with a description of a "gorgeous (cinematographer Gabriel Figueroa) skyspace" with the lyrics "As night falls and the sun sets". Valdés Leal's "Entre Copa y Copa" became a popular ranchera song during the genre's early days.

He became one of the greatest ranchera composers. In the 1950s, ranchera music became the most popular Latin music genre in the United States following the success of Valdés Leal, José Alfredo Jiménez, and Vicente Fernández. On April 26, 2001, the Plaza de los Compositores was erected by the Sociedad General de Escritores de México and approved by mayor of Saltillo Óscar Pimentel González. In its inaugural ceremony, the organization's president Héctor Grimaldo Monsiváis unveiled a commemorative plaque and a bust of Valdés Leal. In May 2005, a mariachi festival held in Mexico City was named after Valdés Leal.

On February 6, 2015, the National Sound Archive of Mexico accessed a collection of 1,419 sound recordings written by Valdés Leal for the purposes of collection, preservation, and conservation. On January 15, 2018, the Palacio de Bellas Artes played Valdés Leal's compositions during Composers Day in Mexico. On June 26, 2019, Valdés Leal and composer José Ángel Espinoza were celebrated at a cultural festival in Saltillo, Mexico.

== Works cited ==
- Hess, Carol A. (2018). Experiencing Latin American Music. University of California Press. ISBN 9780520961005.
- Radanovich, John (2009). Wildman of Rhythm The Life and Music of Benny Moré. University Press of Florida. ISBN 9780813040820.
- Hernández, Marie Theresa (2008). Cemeteries of Ambivalent Desire Unearthing Deep South Narratives from a Texas Graveyard. Texas A&M University Press. ISBN 9781603443876.
- Jàquez, F. Aparicio, C. (2003). Musical Migrations Transnationalism and Cultural Hybridity in Latin/o America. Palgrave Macmillan US. ISBN 9780230107441.
- Irwin, Robert McKee (2013). Global Mexican Cinema Its Golden Age. Bloomsbury Publishing. ISBN 9781844577378.
- Simonett, Helena (2001). Banda: Mexican musical life across borders. Wesleyan University Press. ISBN 9780819564306.
- Avilez, Carlos (2015). México Profundo. Rhythm & Books. ISBN 9786077452522.
- Koennecke, Grace (May 17, 2023). "The Origins of Latin Music". UWIRE (in Spanish). Gale A749637926 – via Gale Research.
- Sánchez, Lucia (June 25, 2001). "Inauguran con musica la Plaza del Compositor". Palabra (in Spanish). Gale A124991506 – via Gale Research.
- "SACM Biografía Sociedad de Autores y Compositores de México". www.sacm.org.mx (in Spanish).
- Morales, Laura Luz (May 7, 2005). "Retoman con festival la musica mexicana". Palabra (in Spanish). Gale A132232572 – via Gale Research.
- Schwartz, Bob (March 1, 1988). "Mariachi: Southwestern Schools Study". Los Angeles Times – via Newspapers.com.
- Cole, Patrick E.; Farley, Christopher John (July 10, 1995). "Old Rock, New Life". Time. Archived from the original on November 7, 2012.
- Ramirez, Erika (March 31, 2015). "Selena's Legacy: Remembering the Singer on the 20th Anniversary of Her Death". Billboard.com.
- "Rinden tributo a 'El Rey del Bolero Ranchero' a 42 años de su muerte". Notimex (in Spanish). April 18, 2006. ProQuest 428303564.
- "Fonoteca Nacional resguarda colección particular de Felipe Valdés Leal". Notimex (in Spanish). February 6, 2015. ProQuest 1652186789.
- "Gold & Platinum > Tu Solo Tu". RIAA.com.
- "Museos de Nuevo León festejarán Día del Compositor con música y talleres". Notimex (in Spanish). January 11, 2018. ProQuest 1986470915.
- "Música, danza y literatura convergerán en Festival Cultural de Saltillo". Notimex (in Spanish). June 26, 2019. ProQuest 2247119093.
