= Tú, sólo tú =

1995 single by Selena

"Tú, sólo tú" (You, Only You) is a ranchera song written by Mexican songwriter Felipe Valdés Leal in 1949. That same year the song was recorded by Miguel Aceves Mejía, Pedro Infante, Luis Pérez Meza and Rosita Quintana.

The song was also included in the films Pueblerina (1949), where it was performed by Roberto Cañedo and Columba Domínguez; Perdida (1950), where it was performed by La Torcacita; and Tú, solo tú (1950), where it was performed by Luis Aguilar.

== Linda Ronstadt version ==
Linda Ronstadt included this track on her album Canciones de Mi Padre in 1987.

== Selena version ==
"Tú, Sólo Tú"

Single by Selena

from the album Dreaming of You
- Released: 1995
- Recorded: 1995
- Studio: Cherokee (Hollywood, California); Q-Zone Studios (Corpus Christi, Texas)
- Length: 3:10
- Label: EMI
- Songwriter: Felipe Valdés Leal
- Producer: José Hernàndez

Selena singles chronology
"I Could Fall in Love" (1995)	"Tú, Sólo Tú" (1995)	"Dreaming of You" (1995)

Music video
- "Tú, Solo Tú" on YouTube

Selena recorded a cover version, It is the second single (first in Spanish) released from the album Dreaming of You. Her version was originally recorded for the 1995 film Don Juan DeMarco. It was the first Spanish-language single to be released from Selena's recording projects following her death.

=== Chart performance ===
The song debuted at number 3 on the Billboard Hot Latin Tracks for the week of July 15, 1995, and climbed to number 1 the following week where it remained for ten weeks, Selena's longest run at number 1.

The single, "I Could Fall In Love", was kept from reaching the top spot on the chart by "Tú sólo tú", but with this feat, Selena became the second performer ever to have singles in the top two spots of the Hot Latin Tracks chart in the same week (the first being Ana Gabriel).

On the Billboard Latin Regional Mexican Airplay chart, the single debuted and peaked at number one, spending nine weeks at the top.

=== Charts ===
Chart (1995–96)	Peak position
US Hot Latin Songs (Billboard)	1
US Regional Mexican Songs (Billboard)	1
Mexico Grupera Songs (El Siglo de Torreón)	1
Mexico Ranchero (El Siglo de Torreón)	2

=== Certifications ===
Region	Certification	Certified units/sales
United States (RIAA)	Platinum (Latin)	60,000^{‡}
^{‡} Sales+streaming figures based on certification alone.

=== Personnel ===
- José Hernàndez - producer, arranger
- Selena - vocals
- Mariachi Sol de México - backing vocals and special guests
- Bruce Robb - engineer
- Robb Bross - mixer
