= I Could Fall in Love =

1995 single by Selena

Single by Selena

from the album Dreaming of You
- Released: 15 June 1995
- Recorded: December 1994 – 25 March 1995
- Studio: The Bennett House (Franklin, Tennessee)
- Genre: Pop; R&B
- Length: 4:41
- Label: EMI Latin
- Songwriter: Keith Thomas
- Producer: Keith Thomas

Selena singles chronology
"Fotos y Recuerdos" (1995)	"I Could Fall in Love" (1995)	"Tú, Sólo Tú" (1995)

Music video
- "I Could Fall in Love" on YouTube

"I Could Fall in Love" is a song recorded by the American Tejano singer Selena for her fifth album, Dreaming of You (1995), released posthumously by EMI Latin on 15 June 1995. "I Could Fall in Love" and "Tú Sólo Tú" were the album's lead promotional recordings and her first English-language songs to be featured as singles, showcasing her musical transition from Spanish-language to English-language songs. The lyrics explore feelings of heartbreak and despair and express the singer's fear of rejection by a man she finds herself falling in love with. Composed by Keith Thomas, "I Could Fall in Love" is a pop ballad with R&B, soul and soft rock influences.

Critics praised Selena's emotive enunciation and compared it to work by Celine Dion, Brandy Norwood and TLC. It received the Tejano Music Award for the Tejano Crossover Song of the Year, and the American Society of Composers, Authors and Publishers (ASCAP) recognized it at the ASCAP Pop Music Awards as one of the most performed songs of 1995. Because of the recording's composition structure and the singer's vocalization, OC Weekly, BuzzFeed, Neon Tommy, and Latina magazine, believed "I Could Fall in Love" was one of the best songs recorded by Selena in her musical career.

The track was not released as a commercial single in the United States, where it was feared that it might sell more copies than the album itself. "I Could Fall in Love" peaked at number eight on the US Billboard Hot 100 Airplay chart, and at number one on the Canadian RPM Adult Contemporary chart. It reached the top ten on the singles charts of Canada and New Zealand. It became the most played song in Kansas City, Miami, and Boston and the second most played in Los Angeles.

The accompanying music video, directed by Hector Galan, featured a montage of pictures and videos of live performances of Selena, which had been collected by her family. It, too, was released posthumously, and it received a Music Video of the Year nomination at the 1996 Tejano Music Awards. "I Could Fall in Love" became one of Selena's most famous and recognizable recordings, and in the 1990s it became a popular wedding song.

== Background and release ==
Before Selena signed a recording contract in 1989 with EMI Latin, she had hinted that she wanted to start recording in English. She was asked to make three demonstration recordings for Charles Koppelman, chairman of EMI Records. After reviewing them, Koppelman declined a crossover attempt, believing that Selena should first strengthen her fan base. Later, after releasing five Spanish-language albums that all achieved unprecedented milestones in the Latin music industry, Koppelman considered that Selena had reached her peak in the Spanish market, and he began preparations for a crossover album.

Selena and her record-producer brother A.B. Quintanilla III arrived in Nashville, Tennessee, intending to collaborate with producer-songwriter Keith Thomas. Thomas had prepared the instrumental parts for "I Could Fall in Love" but had not had time to complete the vocal parts, so he sang it for them. Selena and A.B. immediately liked it, and A.B. said that he wanted Selena to include it in her album. She recorded it in December 1994 at The Bennett House in Franklin, Tennessee, and Bill Whittington mixed it with assistance from Mike Corbett and Todd Moore. Although Selena had to return later when Thomas was able to provide additional vocals, Selena's husband Chris Perez, who had overseen the recording sessions, said that the recording was completed on 25 March 1995.

On 31 March 1995, Selena was murdered in Corpus Christi, Texas, by her friend and former employee Yolanda Saldívar. Thomas later announced that he had been working on another track for Selena to record, telling Biography that the track remained unfinished. "I Could Fall in Love" was released as the lead promotional recording for the 1995 album Dreaming of You on 26 June 1995, at the same time as "Tú Sólo Tú", to demonstrate Selena's transition from Spanish- to English-language recordings. "I Could Fall in Love" debuted on US radios on 15 June 1995 to contemporary hit radios, Top 40, urban AC and rhythmic contemporary airplay, while "Tú Sólo Tú" targeted Latin music radios such as Tejano, Latin pop, and regional Mexican airplay. An editor from the Arizona Daily Star believed "I Could Fall in Love" was targeted more towards adult contemporary radios than R&B and top 40 radio formats that were successful for Gloria Estefan.

"I Could Fall in Love" was released as a maxi single on 26 June 1995 in Australia and Mexico and on 10 August 1995 in Germany. A maxi single featuring "Dreaming of You" and "Sukiyaki" was released in Japan. "Tú Sólo Tú" was released primarily to Spanish-speaking countries. Fred Bronson of Billboard commented that if EMI Latin had released "I Could Fall in Love" as a single and it had debuted in the top 40 of the Billboard Hot 100 chart, then it would have been the first posthumous debut single to do so since "Pledging My Love" by Johnny Ace in 1955.

== Composition and lyrics ==
"I Could Fall in Love"
A sample of "I Could Fall in Love", a pop ballad and R&B number, which makes use of an electronic piano, a violin, and a flute in the background

"I Could Fall in Love" is a mid-tempo pop ballad and R&B song with soul and soft rock influences. Mario Tarradell, an editorial writer for The Dallas Morning News, called the song a "mundane ballad". It is set in common time and employs an electronic piano, drum machine, a violin, and a flute in the background. The instrumentation includes bass drum, keyboard, flamenco guitar, Spanish guitar, and synthesizers. "I Could Fall in Love" is written in the key of E major, to be played in a moderate groove at 78 half notes per minute. The vocal range of the melody extends from the note F♯_{3} to A_{4}. Sandy Masuo of the St. Louis Post-Dispatch wrote, "These songs ["I Could Fall in Love", "I'm Getting Used to You" and "Captive Heart"] were to be her armaments in the crossover war and, sure enough, they're catchy, state-of-the-art pop/R&B – but, despite the sublime melody of "I Could Fall in Love", strikingly anonymous." An editor from the Contra Costa Times called the song a "jazzy ballad". Donny Brusca's book BPM List 2006: Main Edition classified it as "light-adult contemporary". Andrew Griffin of The Town Talk called it a "Tex-Mex (Texas-Mexico) pop" song.

"I Could Fall in Love" is similar to "Dreaming of You" in its lyrics. Many media outlets, including the Milwaukee Journal and Billboard magazine, called them "confessional ballads", with an emotionally vulnerable narrator who wants true love but finds it unattainable. Tarradell believed "I Could Fall in Love" was an indirect response to Selena's father and manager Abraham Quintanilla, Jr., who forced her and Perez to end their relationship just because Perez was a rocker. Tarradell asserted that the words "I know it's not right but I guess I should try to do what I should do" were directed at Abraham and reflected Selena's realization of her independence. Ramiro Burr of the San Antonio Express-News believed that Selena's 1992 song "Missing My Baby" shared similarities with "I Could Fall in Love" in expressing uncontrollable "adrenalin-fueled love". Burr later wrote that the difference in "I Could Fall in Love" is that the lyrics are recorded with "powerful agony" which forces the narrator to "fall into a phase of deep loneliness" because her lover may or may not reciprocate her feelings.

The first verse of "I Could Fall in Love" implores the object of the singer's desire to walk away, because her emotions are too overpowering and she feels love of unprecedented intensity. She fears that by allowing him to stay attached, she may "lose control". Selena believes that her infatuation can lead to romantic love. She then sings "I could fall in love (in love) with you" before wondering how she would feel if she were to touch him for the first time. The fear of being rejected and unloved leads her to keep her feelings to herself, and she begins to believe that her love is "not right". She continues, "and I guess I should try / to do what I should do / but I could fall in love / fall in love with you". During the midpoint break, Selena sings in Spanish that she is always dreaming about him, imagining that he loves her. She sings the chorus twice before the song comes to an end without her ever having come to terms with her loved one.

== Critical reception ==
"I Could Fall in Love" received a generally positive response from music critics, who commented on its similarities to songs recorded by other artists. Ed Morales of Vibe magazine felt that, because of its syncopated drums, "I Could Fall in Love" had a "Jon Secada-like feel", and it reminded Tarradell of songs recorded by American singer Brandy Norwood and by the trio TLC. An editor from the Star-News thought the song had "a whiff of" Celine Dion. James Hunter, also from Vibe, praised Selena's astute interpretation, calling it a "masterpiece" and commenting that Selena's death made the track more difficult to listen to. Larry Flick of Billboard described "I Could Fall in Love" as an "optimistic love song" that left "melancholy thoughts of what might have been" in the mind of the listener. John Lannert, also from Billboard, conceived "I Could Fall in Love" as a "sensuous narrative" recording and a "seductive romantic confessional". Tarradell, writing in The Beaver County Times, called it a "crossover staple".

Mary Talbot of the New York Daily News, praised Selena's "soft, velvety voice". A San Jose Mercury News reporter wrote that "I Could Fall in Love" and "Dreaming of You" helped Selena to become "the new Gloria Estefan". Richard Torres of Newsday considered both these songs to be romantic anthems. Enrique Fernandez of the Sun Sentinel described "I Could Fall in Love" as "beautiful", while an editor from The Sacramento Bee called the song a "Latin-influenced R&B lite". Because of its "overly simplistic and repetitive lyrics", Ramiro Burr of the San Antonio Express-News assessed "I Could Fall in Love" as the "weakest track" of Dreaming of You.

Elizabeth Rodriguez Kessler and Anne Perrin wrote in their 2007 book Chican@s in the Conversations that "I Could Fall in Love" was a "clean pop offering". Joey Guerra of the Houston Chronicle commented in 2008 that it had "made the Tejano goddess a posthumous crossover star". On 31 March 2010, Teresa Jusino of Popmatters expressed the view that English-speaking music fans no longer remember Selena's name, saying that on playing "Dreaming of You" or "I Could Fall in Love", many would say "I remember that song!" or "I love that one!". Randi Bergman of Fashion magazine, called the number an "epic ballad".

== Recognition and accolades ==
"I Could Fall in Love" was nominated for "Song of the Year" at the 1996 Tejano Music Awards, and won the Tejano Crossover Songs of the Year. The American Society of Composers, Authors and Publishers (ASCAP) recognized it as one of the most performed songs of 1995 at the 4th ASCAP Pop Music Awards. Marco Torres of OC Weekly, called the song "so sweet, so loving, so absolutely, amazingly, and astonishingly adorable!" and placed it at number seven on his "Top 10 Selena songs of All time" list. Brian Galindo of BuzzFeed believed the "melancholy ballad is another great example of Selena's ability bring an emotional vulnerability to her songs." and placed "I Could Fall in Love" at number five on his list of "The 15 Greatest Selena Songs of All Time". Latina magazine placed "I Could Fall in Love" at number three on their "Remembering Selena: Her Top Ten Songs" list. Ashley Velez of Neon Tommy commented that "Selena lends her vulnerability to this slow ballad" and that it "displays Selena's talented vocals and helped introduce the singer to the American mainstream." Velez then ranked the recording number two on her list of the "Top 5 Selena Songs".

== Chart performance ==
Davitt Sigerson, the president and CEO of EMI records, feared that "I Could Fall in Love" might sell more copies than the album itself, so he did not issue the single as a commercial release. Therefore, it was not eligible for the Billboard Hot 100 chart. "I Could Fall in Love" debuted at number four on the Hot Latin Tracks chart on 1 July 1995 and peaked at number two the following week, becoming the highest-ever English-language song on that chart. "Tú Sólo Tú" and "I Could Fall in Love" occupied the first and second positions respectively on Hot Latin Tracks for five consecutive weeks. Selena thus became the first artist to place both a Spanish- and an English-language song in the top ten of the Hot Latin Tracks chart. "I Could Fall in Love" became the fifth best-charting song from that chart in 1995 and remained the highest-charting English-language song for two years, until Celine Dion's 1998 single "My Heart Will Go On" surpassed it when it peaked at number one. It also reached number-one on the Billboard Latin Pop Airplay chart.

"I Could Fall in Love" debuted at number 46 on the Hot 100 Airplay chart issue dated 8 July 1995 and peaked eight weeks later at number 8 on 2 September 1995. By entering the Adult Contemporary Tracks chart at number 37 on 29 July 1995, the recording received a "Hot Shot Debut" as the highest debut of the week. It ran at number 14 for three consecutive weeks starting on 21 October 1995.

"I Could Fall in Love" peaked at number 17 on the Adult Top 40 chart and number three on the Hot 100 Recurrent Airplay chart on 23 December 1995. The performance entered the Hot Adult Contemporary Recurrent chart on 27 January 1996 at number six and achieved the same on the Rhythmic Top 40. Number 15 was its highest position on the Mainstream Top 40 chart. In New Zealand, "I Could Fall in Love" debuted at number 36 on the New Zealand Singles Chart on 10 October 1995 and peaked at number ten in the week ending 19 November 1995, its fifth week on the chart. In Canada, "I Could Fall in Love" debuted at number 55 on the RPM Adult Contemporary chart of 24 July 1995. By 30 October it had reached number one. On 21 August 1995 it entered at number 94 on the RPM Top Singles chart, and in October, after eleven weeks, it reached number ten for two consecutive weeks.

== Music video ==
Directed by Hector Galan, the song's accompanying music video featured a montage of pictures and videos of live performances by Selena that had been collected by her family. It was released posthumously and received a Music Video of the Year nomination at the 1995 Tejano Music Awards. This promotional video reached number 11 on the Billboard Video Monitor VH1 Top Music Videos list, number 6 on The BOX Video List, number 10 on the MOR Music list, and number 3 on the California Music Channel (CMC) list of most popular music videos.

== Cultural impact ==
"I Could Fall in Love" dominated the Top 40 radio stations, a fact that was well received by critics. The song was given heavy rotation in the southern United States, becoming the most played song in Kansas City, Miami, and Boston and the second most played in Los Angeles. In Tucson, Arizona, it was played every 2½ hours, and in San Antonio every hour. The song was played 25 times its first day of availability on US radios on the Harlingen, Texas radio station KBTQ. It helped increase Selena's catalogue sales and simultaneously boosted media attention. The song's release sparked a two-day "on-air blitz" on radios in South Texas. In Riverside, California, program directors reported that "I Could Fall in Love" was one of the three hits they were playing most often on their radio stations. A San Antonio disc jockey told The Victoria Advocate about the overwhelming response received from the English-speaking audience, who were constantly calling her radio station asking for "I Could Fall in Love".

"Dreaming of You" and "I Could Fall in Love" were EMI Records' top selling digital downloads from 1 April 2004 to 31 March 2005. "I Could Fall in Love" became one of Selena's most widely recognized recordings. It rapidly became popular as a wedding song, causing it to become one of Selena's most famous songs. Her English-speaking audience increased substantially as a result of its widespread popularity. Amanda Edwards of Voxxi.com called it "one of the most popular Latin love songs of all time", adding that, "from her sweet voice to the genuine sentiment of the song (with a hint of sexiness if you're listening carefully), we're sold on this track being a solid standby any time of year but especially for someone hoping for romance on Valentine's Day".

=== Covers ===
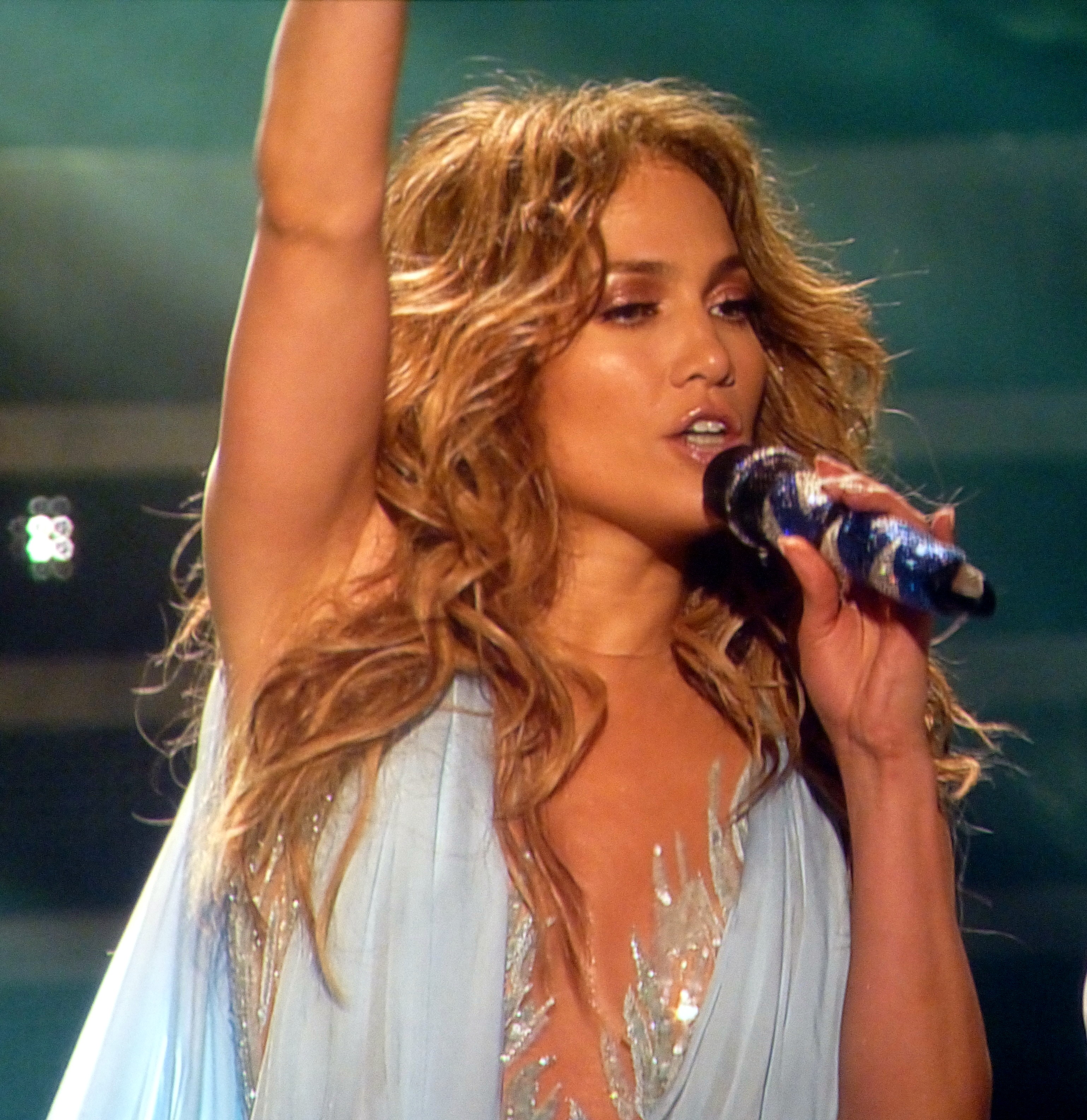
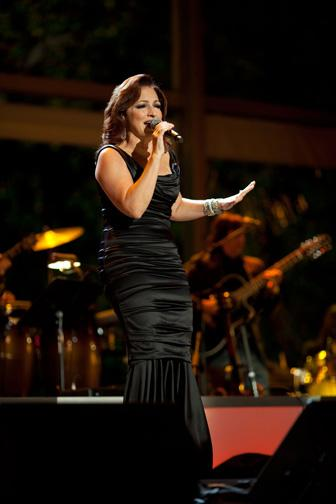
Puerto Rican singer and actress Jennifer Lopez (left) and Cuban-American singer Gloria Estefan (right) have covered the song as a tribute to Selena

A number of singers have adapted the song in a variety of genres. Puerto Rican-American singer and actress Jennifer Lopez lip-synced the track for her portrayal of the title role in the 1997 biographical film Selena, which was praised by critics. Reviewing the film's opening, a Wichita Eagle writer described the song as "hauntingly lovely" and said that it expressed the feelings of Selena's fans. Lopez included "I Could Fall in Love" in the set list for her Let's Get Loud Tour in 2001 at the Roberto Clemente Coliseum in San Juan, Puerto Rico, and on 11 February 2003 she included the song in her live video album Jennifer Lopez: Let's Get Loud. Cuban singer Gloria Estefan performed a cover version during the Selena ¡VIVE! concert in 2005; Tarradell commented in The Dallas Morning News that it had been a "lovely rendition". Puerto Rican singer Ana recorded the song for her album Amor Latino. The Korean singer Im Tae Kyung performed a slower pop ballad version that incorporates a guitar as its musical foundation. A reggae-inspired version of the song appeared on Fiona's Best of Sweet Love.

Season three American Idol contestant Lisa Leuschner included the song in her album Reality. In Kumbia Kings' third compilation album Duetos (2005), Selena's brother A.B. Quintanilla III recorded "I Could Fall in Love" as a Spanglish duet with Selena. For the album Familia RMM Recordando a Selena, recorded by various artists in 1996, Los Jovenes Del Barrio performed a cover of the song. Season 10 American Idol contestant Karen Rodriguez performed "I Could Fall in Love" during the "top 13" episode, receiving unfavorable reviews from critics who considered the song too powerful for her. However, The Washington Post contributor Derrik Lang called Rodriguez' cover a "breathy redemption". American Idol alumna Katie Stevens wrote to The Hollywood Reporter, claiming that the judges on the show had judged Rodriguez too harshly and calling Rodriguez the "new Selena". Rodriguez recorded a studio version of "I Could Fall in Love" in 2011 for her debut album, which was produced by Jim Jonsin.

Solange Knowles included the song in the set list for her 2013 world tour, which has received praise from music critics. Joey Guerra of the Houston Chronicle wrote that Knowles had "put a lovely, downtempo twist on 'I Could Fall in Love'". Michael O'Connell of The Hollywood Reporter called Knowles' rendition a "fangirl cover". Writing in the San Francisco Weekly, Erin Browner considered Knowles' cover the "highlight of the night" when she performed it at the start of her US tour. Browner commented that the "combination of sexy Solange and Selena's epic love song was almost too much for the audience to handle" and that "people immediately whipped out their phones to record (yep, it's already on YouTube) and/or just plain cried the lyrics along with her". On 29 March 2015, Filipino singers Angeline Quinto, Yeng Constantino, and Juris Fernandez performed "I Could Fall in Love" for the variety show ASAP. American singer Adrienne Bailon performed "I Could Fall in Love" after a six-year departure from the music business, during 31 March 2015 episode of The Real; a talk show she co-hosted from 2013 to 2022.

== Formats and track listings ==
- Worldwide Promotional Recording
1. "I Could Fall in Love (Album version)" – 4:40
2. "I Could Fall in Love (Softer version)" – 4:41
- Japan maxi single
1. "I Could Fall in Love" – 4:41
2. "Dreaming of You" – 5:15
3. "Sukiyaki" – 3:01
- Mexican CD single
1. "I Could Fall in Love (Album version)" – 4:40
2. "I Could Fall in Love (Softer version)" – 4:41
3. "Tú Sólo Tú" – 3:12
- Australian maxi single
1. "I Could Fall in Love (Album version)" – 4:40
2. "I Could Fall in Love (Softer version)" – 4:41
3. "Tú Sólo Tú" – 3:45
4. "Amor Prohibido" – 2:50

== Credits and personnel ==
Credits adapted from Dreaming of You album liner notes.

- Keith Thomas — producer, arranger, synthesizer, bass programming
- Selena — lead vocals, backing vocals
- Bill Whittington — vocals recorder, mixer
- Mike Corbett — assistant engineer
- Todd Moore — production coordinator
- Mark Hammond — drums
- Tommy Sims — bass guitar
- Dann Huff — acoustic guitars
- Trey Lorenz — backing vocals

== Charts ==
=== Weekly charts ===
Weekly chart performance for "I Could Fall in Love"
Chart (1995)	Peak position
Australia (ARIA)	60
Canada Top Singles (RPM)	10
Canada Adult Contemporary (RPM)	1
El Salvador (UPI)	3
Iceland (Íslenski Listinn Topp 40)	11
New Zealand (Recorded Music NZ)	10
Panama (UPI)	5
US Radio Songs (Billboard)	8
US Adult Contemporary (Billboard)	12
US Adult Pop Airplay (Billboard)	17
US Hot Latin Songs (Billboard)	2
US Rhythmic Top 40 (Billboard)	5
US Top 40 Mainstream (Billboard)	15
US Cash Box Top 100	26

=== Year-end charts ===
Year-end chart performance for "I Could Fall in Love"
Chart (1995)	Position
Brazil (Crowley)	96
Canada Top Singles (RPM)	93
Canada Adult Contemporary (RPM)	9
US Hot 100 Airplay (Billboard)	41
US Adult Contemporary (Billboard)	39
US Hot Latin Tracks (Billboard)	5

== Certifications ==
Certifications and sales for "I Could Fall in Love"
Region	Certification	Certified units/sales
United States (RIAA)	Gold	500,000^{‡}
^{‡} Sales+streaming figures based on certification alone.

== Release and radio history ==
Release dates and formats for "I Could Fall in Love"
Region	Date	Format(s)	Label	Ref.
United States	16 June 1995	Radio airplay	EMI Latin	
United States	26 June 1995	Contemporary hit radio; rhythmic contemporary radio; urban adult contemporary	EMI Latin	
United States	26 June 1995	CD single	EMI Latin	
Mexico	26 June 1995	Promotional recording	EMI Latin	
Japan	26 June 1995	Maxi single	EMI Latin	
Germany	10 August 1995	CD single	EMI Latin	
Australia	2 October 1995	CD single	EMI Latin	

== See also ==
- Billboard Top Latin Songs Year-End Chart

== Bibliography ==
- Cox, Bill; Franz, Janie (2001). The Ultimate Wedding Reception Book. Bill Cox. p. 120. ISBN 0-9715082-0-8.
- Brusca, Donny (2006). Bpm List 2006: Main Edition. Lulu. p. 700. ISBN 1-84728-860-X.
- Espinosa, Gastón; García, Mario T. (2008). Mexican American religions: spirituality, activism, and culture. Duke University Press. p. 443. ISBN 978-0-8223-4119-2.
- Kessler, Elizabeth Rodriguez; Perrin, Anne (2007). Chican@s in the Conversations. Pearson Longman. p. 242. ISBN 978-0-321-39417-0.
- Pérez, Chris (6 March 2012). To Selena, with Love: Commemorative Edition. Penguin. ISBN 978-1-101-58026-4.
- Stuessy, Joe; Lipscomb, Scott David (2009). Rock and roll: its history and stylistic development (6th ed.). Pearson Prentice Hall. pp. 412. ISBN 978-0-13-601068-5.
- Whitburn, Joel (2010). The Billboard book of top 40 hits (9th ed.). Billboard Books. p. 900. ISBN 978-0-8230-8554-5.
