= Duetos (Kumbia Kings album) =

2005 compilation album by A.B. Quintanilla y Los Kumbia Kings

Compilation album by A.B. Quintanilla y Los Kumbia Kings
- Released: March 29, 2005
- Recorded: 1998–2005
- Genre: Cumbia
- Length: 41:28
- Label: EMI Latin
- Producer: A.B. Quintanilla III; Cruz Martínez

A.B. Quintanilla y Los Kumbia Kings chronology
Fuego (2004)	Duetos (2005)	Kumbia Kings Live (2006)

Singles from Duetos
- 1. "Baila Esta Kumbia" Released: March 15, 2005

Professional ratings
Review scores
Source	Rating
AllMusic	3/5 stars

Duetos (English: Duets) is the third compilation album and ninth album by Mexican-American cumbia group A.B. Quintanilla y Los Kumbia Kings and the third compilation album by Mexican-American musician A.B. Quintanilla. It was released on March 29, 2005, by EMI Latin.

== Track listing ==
No.	Title	Writer(s)	Length
1.	"Baila Esta Kumbia" (featuring Selena)	A.B. Quintanilla III, Pete Astudillo	4:22
2.	"I Could Fall in Love (Kumbia Version)" (featuring Selena)	Keith Thomas	4:51
3.	"Don't Cry Mama" (featuring Dapper Don and Grimm)	Quintanilla III, Ricardo Montaner, Piero Cassano, Anthony "Dapper Don" Angora, Paul "Grimm" Ramírez	4:35
4.	"No Tengo Dinero" (featuring Juan Gabriel and El Gran Silencio)	Juan Gabriel	4:54
5.	"Reggae Kumbia" (featuring Vico C)	Quintanilla III, Vico C	3:53
6.	"Mi Gente" (featuring Ozomatli)	Quintanilla III, Asdru Sierra, Jiro Yamaguchi, Raúl Pacheco, Justin Poree, Luigi Giraldo, Nir Seroussi	4:22
7.	"Fuiste Mala" (featuring Ricky Muñoz of Intocable)	Quintanilla III, Cruz Martínez, Ricky Vela	3:19
8.	"Llévame al Cielo" (featuring Aleks Syntek)	Quintanilla III, Martínez, Aleks Syntek	3:57
9.	"Together" (featuring Babee Power, Nu Flavor and Roger Troutman)	Quintanilla III, Michael "Babee Power" Viera	3:47
10.	"Azúcar" (featuring Fito Olivares)	Quintanilla III, Giraldo, Edward Palmieri	3:28

=== DVD ===
Duetos

Video by A.B. Quintanilla y Los Kumbia Kings
- Released: March 29, 2005
- Recorded: 1999–2003
- Genre: Cumbia
- Length: 19:27
- Label: EMI Latin

A.B. Quintanilla y Los Kumbia Kings chronology
La Historia (2003)	Duetos (2005)	Fuego: Premium Edition (2005)

A CD/DVD version of the album was also released. It contains five music videos.

Duetos DVD
No.	Title	Writer(s)	Length
1.	"Reggae Kumbia" (featuring Vico C)	A.B. Quintanilla III, Vico C	3:54
2.	"Mi Gente" (featuring Ozomatli)	Quintanilla III, Asdru Sierra, Jiro Yamaguchi, Raúl Pacheco, Justin Poree, Luigi Giraldo, Nir Seroussi	4:38
3.	"No Tengo Dinero"	Juan Gabriel	4:03
4.	"Fuiste Mala" (featuring Ricky Muñoz of Intocable)	Quintanilla III, Cruz Martínez, Ricky Vela	3:21
5.	"Azúcar"	Quintanilla III, Giraldo, Edward Palmieri	3:31

== Charts ==
Chart (2005)	Peak position
US Top Latin Albums (Billboard)	11
US Latin Pop Albums (Billboard)	3

== Sales and certifications ==
Region	Certification	Certified units/sales
United States (RIAA)	Platinum (Latin)	100,000^{^}
^{^} Shipments figures based on certification alone.
