= Dos gardenias =

Song
- Language: Spanish
- Written: 1945
- Published: 2 April 1947
- Genre: Bolero
- Songwriter: Isolina Carrillo

"Dos gardenias" is a bolero written in 1945 by Cuban composer and pianist Isolina Carrillo. Widely considered a standard of the Latin music repertoire, the song became a hit for Daniel Santos in 1948, due to his recording with La Sonora Matancera with an arrangement by Pérez Prado. Years later the composition would achieve international fame beyond the Spanish-speaking world thanks to Ibrahim Ferrer's 1996 recording with the Buena Vista Social Club collective.

== Recording history ==
"Dos gardenias" was first recorded by Guillermo Arronte for the RHC-Cadena Azul radio station in Havana, in 1945. Arronte would later become Carrillo's husband. That year Avelina Landín popularised the song in Mexico. The song achieved its greatest success in Cuba in 1947 thanks to the recording by La Sonora Matancera with an arrangement by Pérez Prado and lead vocals by Daniel Santos. Fernando Álvarez recorded the song that year as well, which became Carrillo's favourite rendition. Soon after, Antonio Machín made the song famous in Spain.

In 1948, jazz singer Miguel de Gonzalo recorded the song for Peerless Records backed by Julio Gutiérrez's orchestra. He later recorded another version with Sonora Matancera for Stinson Records under the name Conjunto Tropicavana for legal reasons.
