= La Historia (Kumbia Kings video album) =

Video by A.B. Quintanilla y Los Kumbia Kings
- Released: October 21, 2003
- Recorded: 1999–2003
- Genre: Cumbia
- Length: 49:40
- Label: EMI Latin

A.B. Quintanilla y Los Kumbia Kings chronology
La Historia (2003)	Duetos (2005)

La Historia is a DVD by A.B. Quintanilla y Los Kumbia Kings. It was released on October 21, 2003.

== Track listing ==
No.	Title	Writer(s)	Length
1.	"Mi Gente"	A.B. Quintanilla III, Asdru Sierra, Jiro Yamaguchi, Raúl Pacheco, Justin Poree, Luigi Giraldo, Nir Seroussi	4:38
2.	"Insomnio"	A.B. Quintanilla III, Luigi Giraldo, Chris Pérez	3:35
3.	"No Tengo Dinero"	Juan Gabriel	4:05
4.	"La Cucaracha"	A.B. Quintanilla III, Cruz Martínez, Jason Cano, Nick "DJ Franz" Washington	3:43
5.	"Desde Que No Estás Aquí"	A.B. Quintanilla III, Luigi Giraldo	3:41
6.	"U Don't Love Me"	Sean Dunson, John Dunson	3:55
7.	"Shhh!"	A.B. Quintanilla III, Cruz Martínez, Luigi Giraldo	3:54
8.	"Boom Boom"	A.B. Quintanilla III, Cruz Martínez, Luigi Giraldo	4:32
9.	"Se Fue Mi Amor"	A.B. Quintanilla III, Pete Astudillo, Luigi Giraldo	3:22
10.	"Te Quiero a Ti"	A.B. Quintanilla III, Ricky Vela	3:25
11.	"Fuiste Mala"	A.B. Quintanilla III, Ricky Vela, Cruz Martínez	3:23
12.	"Reggae Kumbia"	A.B. Quintanilla III, Vico C	3:55
13.	"Azúcar"	A.B. Quintanilla III, Luigi Giraldo, Edward Palmieri	3:32
