= Bob Schwartz =

Robert "Bob" Risdon Schwartz (born September 17, 1950) is a healthcare and political figure who resides in Nashville, Tennessee. He was elected as a Delegate to two National Conventions and was an unsuccessful candidate in a 2010 primary to take on the incumbent in Tennessee's Fifth Congressional District. 5th Congressional District of Tennessee. He is currently in real estate sales and investment in Nashville, Tennessee based at Compass, the New York City-based real estate giant. He has been a songwriter for many years and is, also, nearing production of a sandal he created that was inspired by the one worn by the Statue of Liberty. The LIBERTY SANDAL rollout is expected to coincide with the USA's semiquincentennial (250th anniversary) celebrations in 2026/2027.

== Early years and education ==
Schwartz was born in Detroit, Michigan. His father was Arthur Schwartz, a chemical engineer. Martin, his great-grandfather, was a Jewish emigre who came to America from Hungary in 1891. His mother Mary Margaret (née Moore) was a homemaker. Her family emigrated from Wales to America in 1732. Schwartz has one brother, Arthur Schwartz Jr. Both sons were raised in the Episcopal Church following their mother's religious tradition. Schwartz was in college during the Viet Nam War, but received a high lottery number and was not called up to serve. Both sides of his family have strong military tradition. His grandfather, Frederick Wolf Schwartz, served in the U.S. Army in World War I. His father saw duty in the U.S. Navy in the Pacific theater in World War II. His brother is retired from the U.S. Air Force. Several family members from his mother's side fought for the colonies in the Revolutionary War.

Schwartz began his education in public schools in Holland, Michigan before his family returned to the Detroit area. He attended public schools in Grosse Pointe before matriculating at the University of Michigan. Working his way through college, Schwartz majored in anthropology and was a rare conservative elected to his college's Government Council in the radical sixties. After graduation, he returned to Detroit where he worked as a UAW member stacking parts in a Chrysler warehouse. Having become interested in health care organization and administration at Michigan, Schwartz entered Yale University and graduated with a Master of Public Health degree in health services administration. He served as President of his class.

== Professional career ==
Most of Schwartz' career was spent in healthcare in Detroit. His career began at Blue Cross Blue Shield of Michigan where he worked with auto companies and the UAW on the national health plan for auto workers at General Motors, Ford and Chrysler. He spent time in the clinical laboratory industry at SmithKline and the Detroit Medical Center. After moving to Nashville in the mid-1990s, Schwartz worked with hospitals and employers developing employee wellness programs. He is currently an Advisor around real estate sales and investment matters with Compass in Nashville.

== Activities and interests ==
Schwartz was a competitive oarsman for fifteen years. Based at the Detroit Boat Club, the oldest boat club in continuous operation in the US, he competed in fours and, later, in the lightweight single. He holds bronze and silver medals from the U.S. Rowing Championships and won four gold medals in lightweight events at Canadian Henley Regattas.

Schwartz interrupted his healthcare career to pursue a music career in the late 1990s. Adopting his mother's maiden name, he performed as Bobby Moore and developed a following in Berlin, Germany. He released one CD titled "Off the Grill." He became a voting member of the Country Music Association (CMA) in 1994. A handful of Moore's songs were recorded by independent artists. "Three Weeks to Go," a song co-written with Hank "Cowboy from Japan" Sasaki, was named Story Song of the Year by the Traditional Country Music Association (TCMA) in 2014. TCMA founder Bob Everhart described the song in an on-line review as: "An astonishing rendition of what country music has always been...."

== Politics ==
Schwartz became involved in the Presidential race supporting the Republican ticket of John McCain and Sarah Palin. He founded and chaired a grassroots organization called Music Row 4 McCain that generated networking and media attention for McCain/Palin. Largely as a result, he was one of 100 Americans to be named to the Platform Committee at the 2008 Republican National Convention in Minneapolis. As a freshman on the Platform Committee, Schwartz added "home schooling" as a legitimate alternative to public school education to the Platform. He also drafted language that was approved on a voice vote of the full Committee emphasizing the importance of prevention and early detection in health policy. Schwartz was also elected and served as a Delegate-at-Large from Tennessee to the 2008 Convention.

After the loss of the McCain/Palin ticket, Schwartz returned to local grassroots activities. He was elected one of three Regional Directors of the Davidson County Republican Party. He also served as Membership Chair for the group and, in that role, worked to bring trainers from Leadership Institute, the Arlington-based conservative think tank where he had previously studied, to two training workshops in Nashville.

Schwartz began investigating a run for Congress against long-time incumbent Democrat Jim Cooper in Tennessee's Fifth Dustrict in 2009. Cooper, the wealthy son of a former Tennessee Governor, announced his intention to run for re-election to a ninth term in Congress. Schwartz entered a crowded Republican field and focused his campaign on healthcare reform. He lost his bid finishing a distant fifth place. In 2012, he served as executive director of Newt Gingrich's statewide volunteer effort. Largely as a result, he was elected a Delegate to the 2012 Republican National Convention in Tampa garnering more votes in Tennessee's Fifth Congressional District than Gingrich or eventual party nominee Mitt Romney.
