= Avitia =

Avitia is a surname. Notable people with the surname include:

- Francisco Avitia (1915–1995), Mexican singer and actor
- Mariana Avitia (born 1993), Mexican archer
- Valentina Ramírez Avitia (1893 – 1979), Mexican revolutionary
