= Luis Pérez Meza =

Mexican singer & boxer (1917–1981)

- Born: Ignacio Pérez Meza; 22 May 1917; La Rastra, Municipality of Cosalá, Cosalá, Sinaloa, Mexico
- Died: 9 June 1981 (aged 64); Guasave, Sinaloa, Mexico
- Occupations: Singer, songwriter, boxer and actor
- Spouse(s): Carmen Vidrio and Tomasa Bojórquez
- Children: Elisa, Julio César
- Relatives: Antonio Pérez Meza, member of Los Duendes (brother)
- Musical career
- Genres: Banda, Ranchera
- Instrument: Vocals
- Label: Columbia

Ignacio Pérez Meza (22 May 1917 – 9 June 1981), better known as Luis Pérez Meza or El Trovador del Campo, was a Mexican singer, boxer and actor. He was a singer of banda and ranchera music, he also appeared in several films of the Golden Age of Mexican cinema.

Pérez Meza's holiday home in Mazatlán, Sinaloa served briefly as museum and cultural center.

== Early life and career ==
Luis Pérez Meza, whose given name was Ignacio (he changed it to that of a brother who had died prematurely) was born in La Rastra, in the municipality of Cosalá, Sinaloa. Sources differ as to his date of birth (May or July 1917) to Zenón or Simón Pérez and Isabel Meza.

In 1925 he began his studies in Culiacán and between 1931 and 1935 he made his first performances as part of the duo "Chico y Nacho" with Francisco Anzures Parra. He combined this career with that of boxer, in which he had the nickname of Kid Mundial and in which he is credited with at least sixty knockouts. In 1936 he went on a tour that took him to Guadalupe De los Reyes to sing and to Tijuana, Sonora, Los Mochis, Culiacán, Cosalá and Mazatlán to box.

The duo "Chico and Nacho" became a quintet when Francisco Sandoval and his brothers Luis and Emilio joined the group, which they named "Los Parrangos" and which lasted a short time. In the early 40s he made his debut as a soloist at XESA in Culiacán and Tijuana. In 1943 he traveled to Mexico to make himself known.

They were not easy times for Luis who after much wandering playing in bars and family parties obtained recognition in the XEW, thanks to his inclusion in the program "Fiesta Ranchera" hosted by Matilde Sánchez, "La Torcacita". According to some it was in that period when he received the nickname El Trovador del Campo, although others claim that he received this pseudonym from Pedro de Lille already in 1952. At that same stage Pérez Meza studied singing with Beatriz Pizzarniwith the idea of debuting in opera because his tenor voice seemed promising. However, popular music attracted him and in 1944 he joined as lead voice in the "Cuarteto Metropolitano" of Felipe Bermejo.

In 1945 he traveled to the islands of Guam and Iowa in the Philippines and to Hawaii to sing for the Mexican soldiers of Squadron 201 that participated in World War II. In May 1946 he definitively changed his stage name to "Luis Pérez Meza" at the suggestion of the executives of XEW. The following year he formed the Trio Culiacán together with "El Negrumo" and "El Gordo Villarreal" and with the RCA Victor label he recorded El Charro Alegre and Bonito Montemorelos. Between 1947 and 1949 he lived in Madrid, where he was known as The Golden Voice of America. It was in that year that he recorded with the same label (RCA Victor) one of his greatest hits: El Barzón, an agrarian song, composed by Miguel Muñiz and to which he made the arrangement that made it famous.

He was co-founder of the National Association of Actors (ANDA), and in 1948 he filmed " Allá en el Rancho Grande " with Jorge Negrete, under the direction of Fernando de Fuentes. Felipe Valdez Leal hired him to record with the mariachi Vargas, for Columbia, his first LP that contains songs like La Rondalla, Al morir la tarde and El carro del sol.

It was in 1951-52 when he decided to sing country music with Banda sinaloense: the first two songs he performed in that style were India bonita and El sauce y la palma. At the same time he continued his appearances in the cinema acting with Pedro Armendáriz in the films La Casa Colorada and Juan Charrasqueado. Between 1958 and 1962, Chano Urueta directed him in another eight films.

Throughout his career he worked with the Guamuchileños from Culiacán, El Recodo de Don Cruz Lizárraga, Los Sirolas, Los Quiñónez de La Cruz, the Tepuxta band, Los Tierra Blanca, La Costeña and Porfirio Amarillas' band. It was with Ramón López Alvarado's Costeña that he had the longest artistic career, as he toured with them for more than 15 years. Given his success and his vocal quality, many composers created songs especially for his voice: Alfonso Esparza Oteo (La Rondalla, Song of the Heart), Melo Díaz (Bury Me with the Band), Ventura Romero (Madrigal), Enrique Sánchez Alonso (The Golden Rooster), Felipe Bermejo (When the Afternoon Dies).

Luis Pérez Meza sang for the last time at the Teacapán bar in Guasave. He died on June 9, 1981. His remains rest in the Jardín pantheon in Mexico City. His musical heritage is shared by his family since almost all of his brothers - Emilio, Moisés and José Antonio - were also singers (only Manuel Pérez Meza, the eldest of the brothers, did not sing professionally). Likewise, his daughter, Elisa Pérez Meza, who in Sinaloa was called La Trovadora, followed in the artistic footsteps of her father, as did his son Jorge Luis Pérez Meza.

Regarding Luis Pérez Meza, the National Pedagogical University published the book "And the yoke continues walking" by Hernando Hernández in 1992, and Difocur-Sinaloa published "The love of the Isabeles" by Leonor Mena in 2001.

== Filmography ==
1. Las cuatro milpas (1960)
2. El hombre del alazán (1959)
3. Cuando se quiere, se quiere (1959)
4. My Adorable Savage (1952)
5. Mariachis (1950)
6. Allá en el Rancho Grande (1949)
7. Juan Charrasqueado (1948)
8. India Bonita
