= María Luisa Landín =

Mexican singer (1921–2014)

- The Queen of Bolero, circa 1940s
- Born: María Luisa Landín Rodríguez; 9 October 1921; Mexico City, Mexico
- Died: 20 June 2014 (aged 92); Mexico City, Mexico
- Occupation: singer
- Years active: 1935-1977
- Known for: bolero, latin ballad, mariachi
- Notable work: "Amor perdido" became her signature song
- Relatives: Avelina Landín (elder sister)

María Luisa Landín (9 October 1921 – 20 June 2014) was a Mexican singer. She sang bolero, Latin ballad and mariachi styles and was most noted for bolero. She began her career singing as a duo with her sister, but her most memorable works were as a solo singer after their duet broke up. Her 1949 interpretation of "Amor perdido" by Puerto Rican composer Pedro Flores became her signature song, is the second most frequently played song in the history of the Mexican broadcasting and earned her the title "Queen of the Bolero". She recorded over 150 songs with RCA Records between 1939 and 1967, was a featured artist on La Voz Dominicana Television and appeared as a singer in several movies.

== Biography ==
María Luisa Landín Rodríguez was born on 9 October 1921 in the Tepito neighborhood of Mexico City, Mexico to Magdalena Rodríguez, a singer, and Irineo Landín, a guitarist. She began singing with her sister Avelina Landín in 1935 at parties and private functions and they were hired for their first professional work by the radio stations XEYZ and XEFO the following year, under the name "Pyrite and Jade". In 1938, they were hired to an exclusive contract with the broadcaster XEQ, parent company of XEFO, and were promoted as rivals of the sister-duo "Hermanas Águila" (the Águila Sisters). In 1939, the sisters changed their name to the "Hermanas Landín" (Landin Sisters) and signed with RCA Victor. The duo was very popular and recorded many songs. Some of the most noted were "Arrejúntateme", (1939) "La Pendenciera" (1939), "Vuelve, vuelva" (1939), "Mi destino fue quererte" (1940), "Yo quiero de eso" (1940), "Pasional" (1941), "La Perlita" (1941), and "Por quererte tanto" (1941), among others. At the height of their popularity, Avelina married Ángel Zempoalteca and retired from singing in 1942.

External audio
- You may listen to María Luisa Landín sing Amor Perdido

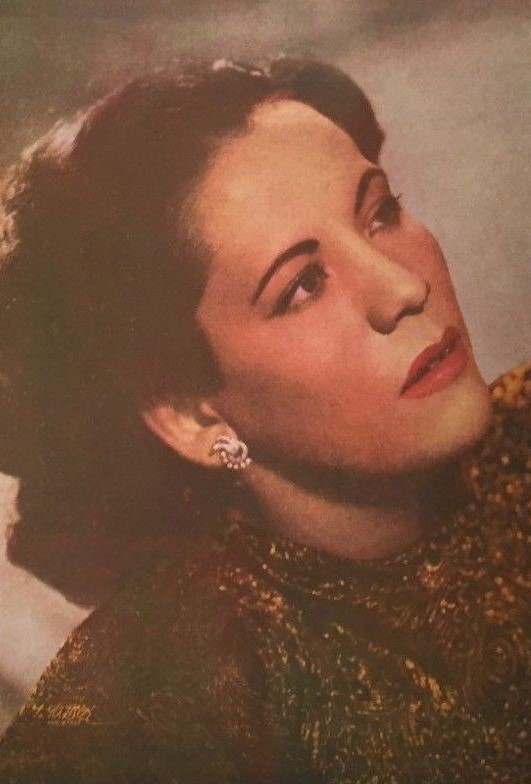
María Luisa Landín photo

Even before their split, Landín had made several solo recordings, including "Allá" (1941), "Sin ti" (1941), "Una canción más" (1941), "Vuelve" (1941) and "Canción del alma" (1942). Then after the break-up, in 1943 she recorded duets for the Coca-Cola Company with tenor, Néstor Mesta Chaires, which included "Bésame mucho", "Delirio", "Enamorado de ti", "Luna de Plata", "Muchos besos", "Que voy hacer sin ti" and "Vivirás en mí". The following year, she recorded four boleros—"Entre hamacas", "Me gustabas", "Noche" and "Regresa"—for Peerless Records, but her biggest successes started in 1946 with her signing again with RCA. In all, she recorded over 150 songs with the label. In 1948 and 1949, she had hits with "Criminal" by Rafael de Paz, "Malos pensamientos" by Alberto Domínguez and "Porque no te vas" by Rafael Hernández, but her biggest successes would come with "Amor perdido" (Lost Love, 1949) by Pedro Flores. The song became a hit and took her to the top of the charts, becoming her biggest and most recognized hit. Her interpretation of "Lost Love" has become the second most-played song in the history of Mexican broadcasting and earned her the title "Queen of the bolero". Besides her interpretation of "Amor perdido", Landín's most successful recordings included "Aunque tengas razón" (1946) by Consuelo Velázquez, "Déjame en paz" (1946) by Luciano Miral, "Dos almas" (1946) by Don Fabián; "Injusticia" (1946) by Pablo Beltrán and "Será por Eso" (1946) by Consuelito Velázquez.

In 1940, Landín had made a tour in Cuba and South America and she repeated a tour of South America in 1949, gaining international recognition. She subsequently successfully toured throughout Mexico, the Caribbean, Central and South America as well as in Los Angeles, San Francisco and Spain, working with a variety of artists. For a brief period at the end of the 1940s, she lived in Santo Domingo, Dominican Republic, and more briefly in Havana. In addition, she appeared singing boleros in several films, including Su gran ilusión (1944) written and directed by Mauricio Magdaleno, Amor perdido (1950) directed by Miguel Morayta, El jibarito Rafael (1969) directed by Julián Soler and A fuego lento o México nocturno (1977) written and directed by Juan Ibáñez. She also appeared on television in the Dominican Republic. In 1955 a production in celebration of the thirteenth anniversary of La Voz Dominicana TV teamed her with Luis Arcaraz, Fernando Fernández, María Elena Marqués, Amalia Mendoza, María Antonieta Pons, Flor Silvestre and Nicolás Urcelay. The show was successful and the group repeated performances in 1957 and 1958. Her final recordings were "Horas en vano" by José Rubén Márquez and "Menor de edad" by Eduardo Lazo, both recorded in 1967 with the Orchestra of Chucho Ferrer. In the late 70s, Carlos Monsiváis wrote a book called "Amor perdido" and dedicated it to her.

Landín died on 20 June 2014 in Mexico City.

== Personal ==
Landín was married three times. Her first husband was Lorenzo Ibáñez, by whom she had her only daughter, Graciela Ibáñez Landín. Her second husband was the Cuban composer Fernando Mulen, whom she married and lived with in Havana. Landín's third husband was Juan Eugenio Cañavera, whom she married in 1954 in Medellín, Colombia.

== Discography ==
Landin recorded from the late 1930s to the late 1960s for RCA Victor, then in the 1970s for Orfeón.

=== Studio albums ===
- Con la voz del alma... María Luisa Landín
- Orquídeas vocales por María Luisa Landín
- Ayer... hoy... y siempre

=== Compilation albums ===
- 8 éxitos de María Luisa Landín (1950s)
- Lo mejor de María Luisa Landín (1960s)
- 15 éxitos de María Luisa Landín (1986)
- Las estrellas de La Hora Azul (1992)
- Lo mejor de lo mejor: María Luisa Landín, 40 temas originales (2000)
- RCA 100 años de música: María Luisa Landín (2001)
- Tesoros de colección: María Luisa Landín (2006)
- Serie del recuerdo (2016)
