= Carlos Gómez Barrera =

Mexican politician

Deputy of the Congress of the Union for the 1st district of Quintana Roo
- In office 1 September 1976 – 31 August 1979
- Preceded by: Sebastián Uc Yam
- Succeeded by: Pedro Joaquín Coldwell

Personal details
- Born: 19 May 1918 Payo Obispo, Quintana Roo, Mexico
- Died: 17 March 1996 (aged 77) Mexico City, D.F., Mexico
- Party: PRI

Carlos Gómez Barrera (Note: In this Spanish name, the first or paternal surname is Gómez and the second or maternal family name is Barrera.) (19 May 1918 – 17 March 1996) was a Mexican musician, composer, politician, and trade-union leader. He was born in Payo Obispo (now Chetumal), Quintana Roo, on 19 May 1918 and died in Mexico City on 17 March 1996.

== Education ==
Carlos Gómez Barrera began his elementary studies in the city of Chetumal. He later transferred to Mexico City and began studies at the National School of Agriculture in Chapingo, which he did not complete as a result of health problems.

== Career ==
On 1 May 1958 he was elected general secretary of the composers section of the International Federation of Film Production in Mexico, a position to which he was later reelected for eight consecutive periods. In addition he was general secretary of the syndicated miso for two periods, from 1968 to 1970 and from 1976 to 1978, plus he was the first president of the Federation of Mesoamerican Authors, producers and performers.

He was elected to the Chamber of Deputies for the 1st district of Quintana Roo, representing the Institutional Revolutionary Party (PRI). He served from 1976 to 1979 during the 50th session of Congress. He was declared a favored son (hijo predilecto) of Quintana Roo on 17 November 1973.

== Works ==
He soon became completely dedicated to musical compositions. His first composition was La Marcha for the Quintana Roo reserves. He entered this song into a contest to select the national march for the reserves. This event was organized by El Universal in 1943. Barrera placed tenth nationally and first for Quintana Roo. He later compiled other compositions dedicated to his native town including: Leyenda de Chetumal (Legend of Chetumal), Cozumel, Navidad en Isla Mujeres (Christmas in Mujeres Island), Mi homenaje a Cancún (My tribute to Cancun), Inútil es fingir (Useless to pretend), Milagro de amor (Miracle of love), Falsos Juramentos (False oaths), Que me castigue Dios (That God would punish me), Mentira (Lie), Tú eres mi destino (You are my destiny) and Por un puñado de oro (For a piece of gold).
