= Isolina Carrillo =

- Born: December 9, 1907; Havana, Cuba
- Died: February 21, 1996 (aged 88) Havana, Cuba
- Occupations: Singer, composer and musician
- Formerly of: Conjunto Siboney

Isolina Carrillo (December 9, 1907 – February 21, 1996) was a cuban singer, composer and musician. She was a member of the vocal group Conjunto Siboney.

At the age of eleven she made her musical debut replacing a pianist that called in sick in her father’s orchestra. She came from a musical family; her brothers and father were musicians. She studied in the Municipal Conservatory of Havana.

In the 1940s, she composed boleros, guarachas and sones. Her songs included "Fiesta de besos", "Canción sin amor", "Increíble" and "Dos gardenias", composed in 1945. This last composition has been covered by many singers, including Daniel Santos, Antonio Machin, Pedro Vargas, Maria Rita and Ibrahim Ferrer.
