= La Torcacita =

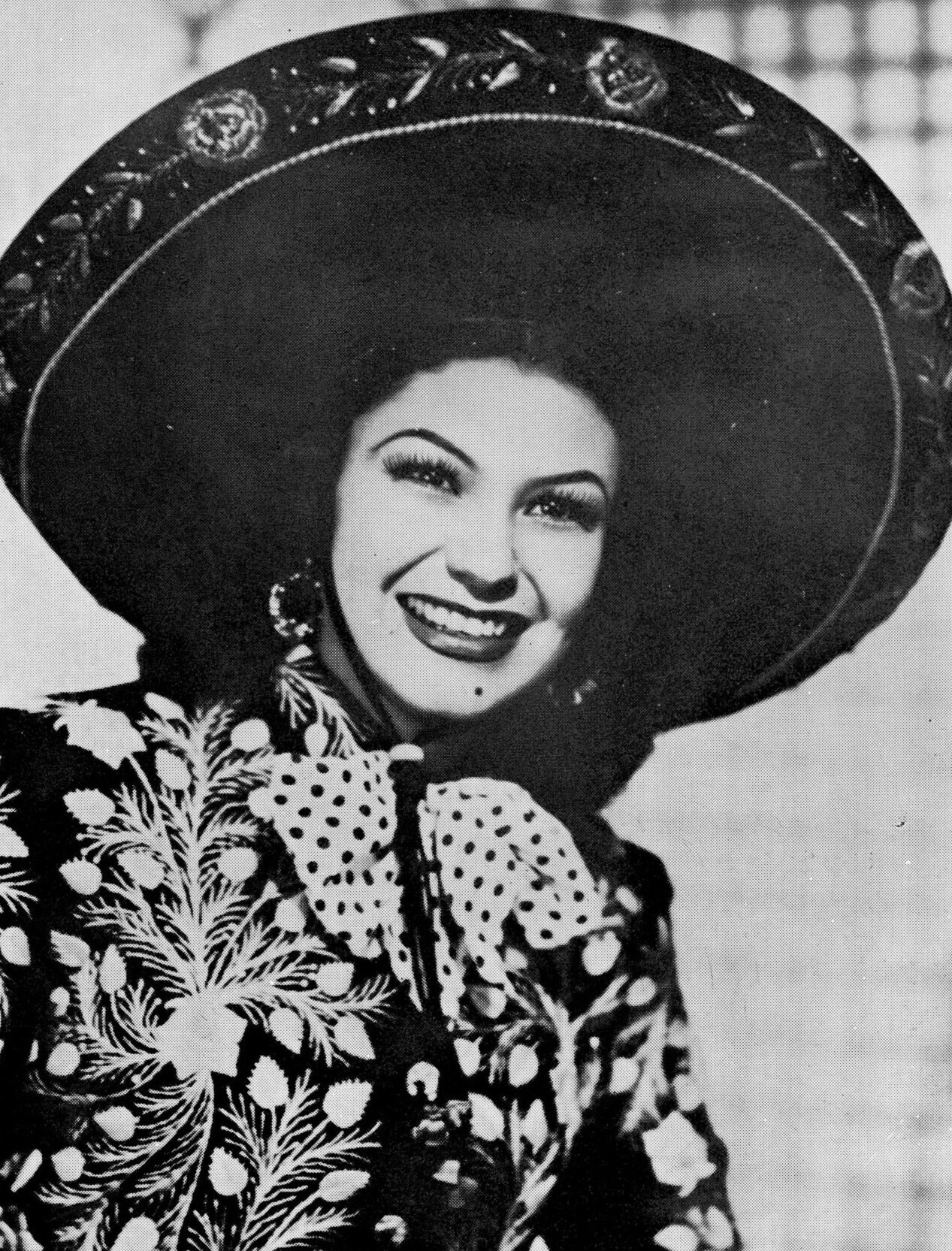
La Torcacita in 1954

Matilde Sánchez Elías (24 March 1924 – 1 November 1988), known by her stage name La Torcacita, was a Mexican singer specialized in the musical genres of ranchera, huapango and corrido.

== Discography ==
=== Compilation albums ===
- 15 éxitos de Matilde Sánchez "La Torcacita", versiones originales (RCA/Ariola, 1986)
- 3 voces inolvidables de la canción ranchera: La Torcacita, La Consentida, La Panchita (Sony, 2013)
- XEW, la Voz de la América Latina desde México, presenta a Matilde Sánchez "La Torcacita" (Peerless, 2014)
