= Avelina Landín =

Mexican singer (1919–1991)

- Born: Avelina Landín Rodríguez; 10 November 1919; Mexico City, Mexico
- Died: 21 February 1991 (aged 71); Mexico City, Mexico
- Occupation: Singer
- Spouse: Ángel Zempoaltecatl Ortega
- Children: Ángel, Juana and Carlos
- Relatives: María Luisa Landín (younger sister)

Avelina Landín Rodríguez (10 November 1919 – 21 February 1991) was a Mexican singer, considered "one of the great and distinctive voices of Mexican bolero music".

She was born in Mexico City to Irineo Landín Jauregui and Magdalena Rodríguez Moreno. She was the elder sister of singer María Luisa Landín, with whom she formed the duets Pirita y Jade and Hermanas Landín in the 1930s. Together they recorded several singles and were very successful on radio, especially on the XEQ station. Avelina retired from singing when she married Ángel Zempoaltecatl Ortega, and María Luisa began her solo career. When she resumed her career years later, Avelina, as a soloist, had a very important place on the XEW station and recorded her hits for the RCA Víctor label.

Landín died of cardiac arrest in Mexico City and was interred at Mausoleos del Ángel.

== Discography ==
=== Singles ===
- "Quiéreme, pero quiéreme" (1949)
- "¿Por qué has cambiado?" (1949)
- "¿Por qué te vas?" (1949)
- "Una mirada nada más" (1949)
- "Que me castigue Dios" (1949)
- "No te desesperes" (1949)
- "Culpable" (1949)
- "Todos somos así" (1949)
- "Amor de mi vida" (1949)
- "Buenas noches, mi amor" (1949)
- "Equivocadamente" (1950)
- "Estamos en paz" (1950)

=== Studio albums ===
- La voz que canta al corazón (Orfeón, 1968)
- Nostalgia (Caleidofon, 1976)

=== Compilation albums ===
- Recordando "La voz cálida" de Avelina Landín (RCA Camden)
- Colección bolero: Avelina Landín (Orfeón)
- Boleros inolvidables (Musart)
