= Alfonso Esparza Oteo =

Mexican composer (1894–1950)

Alfonso Esparza Oteo (Aguascalientes, 2 August 1894 - Mexico City, 31 January 1950) was a Mexican composer. Esparza first success among Mexico City music fans was a foxtrot, and his music was enormously popular in the 1920s. Álvaro Obregón was listening to "El Limoncito", one of Esparza's compositions, when he was assassinated.

== Works, editions and recordings ==
- Dime que sí (arranged by Efraín Oscher on Rolando Villazón: ¡Mexico! DG: 4779234)
- Un viejo amor (arranged by Gonzalo Grau on Rolando Villazón: ¡Mexico! DG: 4779234)
